= Dowdall =

Surname

Dowdall is an Irish surname. The earliest forms of spelling were: Dowdell, Dowdale and Dowdle. Dowdall was first used as a surname in Yorkshire, certainly by the time of the Norman conquest of England.

The Irish Dowdalls came from the valley of Dovedale in Derbyshire. They settled in County Louth in the thirteenth century.

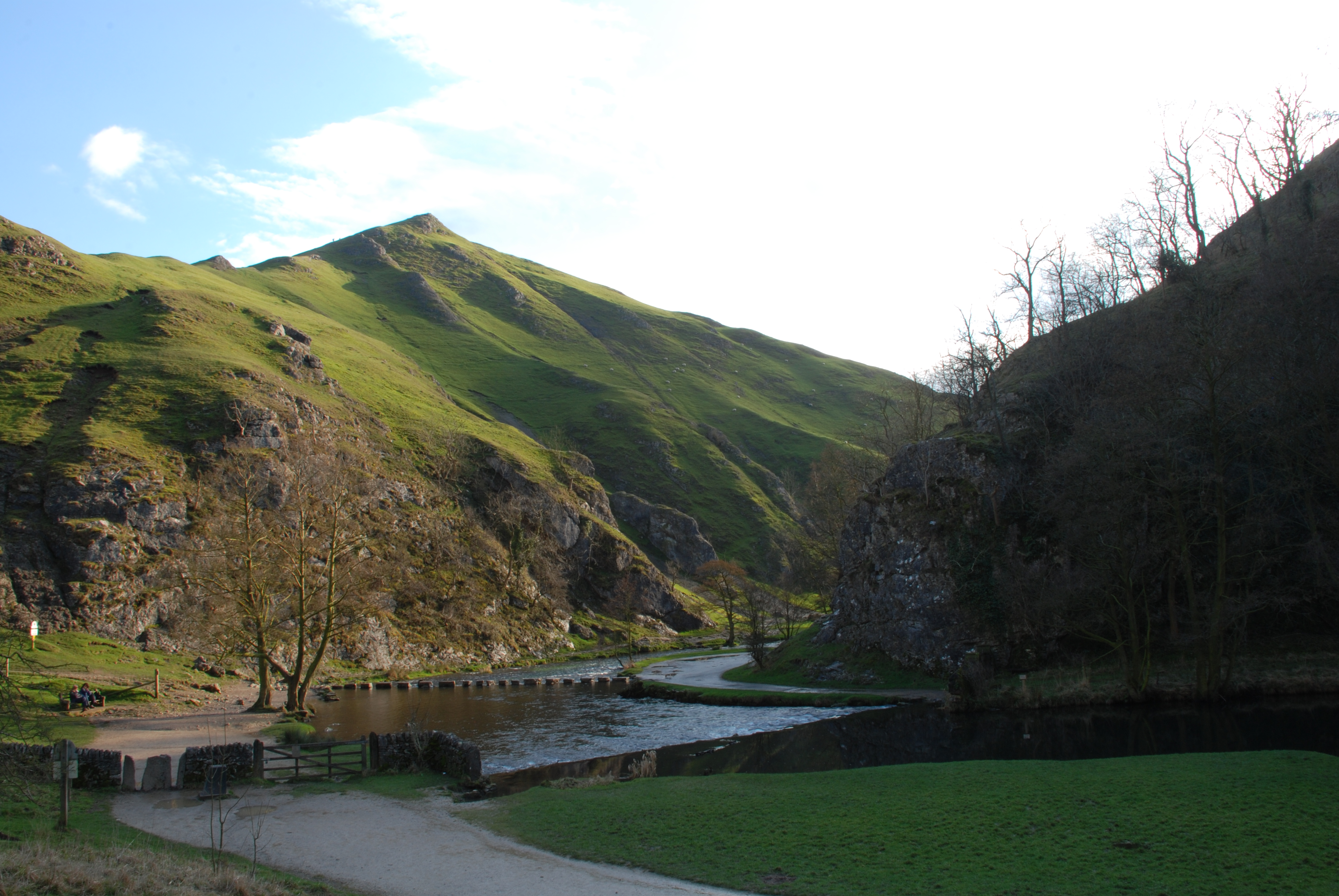
Dovedale, Derbyshire

== Fifteenth century ==
- Sir Robert Dowdall was Chief Justice of the Irish Common Pleas.
- Thomas Dowdall, son of Robert, was Master of the Rolls in Ireland.

== Under the Tudors ==
- George Dowdall became Primate of All Ireland during Henry VIII's reign.
- James Dowdall of Drogheda was executed in 1599 and is regarded as a Catholic martyr.
- James Dowdall, cousin of the martyr James Dowdall, was Lord Chief Justice of Ireland.

== Later Dowdalls ==
- Charlie Dowdall (1898–?), Irish footballer
- Con Dowdall (b. 1945), Irish hurler
- Eddie Dowdall (1901–1968), Welsh rugby union player
- Harry Dowdall (1872–1912), Australian rules footballer
- James Charles Dowdall (1873–1939), Irish politician
- Jane Dowdall (1899–1974), Irish politician
- Jim Dowdall (1867–1945), Australian rules footballer
- John Dowdall (b. 1960), American golfer
- Leslie Dowdall (b. 1961), Irish singer-songwriter
- Niall Dowdall (b. 1992), Irish hurler
- Paddy Dowdall (b. 1983), Irish hurler
- Terry Dowdall (b. 1964/65), Canadian politician
- Thomas Dowdall (1870–1942), Irish politician

== Surname variants ==
- Alex Dowdalls (b. 1960), Scottish cricket umpire

== Althumney House ==
George Dowdall built a strong gatehouse, Althumney House near Navan, County Meath; it was a building of the 15th century that was later enlarged and fortified by other Dowdalls. In 1630 a long, narrow gabled mansion with large mullioned windows and an oriel window was added. Today, it lies in ruins near the River Boyne.

The tower house had four storeys, with an attic and four projecting corner turrets of different sizes. Inside the manor house, there are small hidden latrines and chambers, where the Catholic Dowdalls used to hide priests.

The mansion was supposedly burnt in 1649 as "one of ye families of ye Maguires was living in it when Oliver Cromwell took Drogheda and to prevent Oliver from getting any shelter or subsistence there, set ye stately fabric on fire which consumed all ye curious apartments which were said to be very rich and costly".

== Coat of arms ==
The Dowdall family coat of arms depicts three red birds on a red and white background. White was meant to represent pureness and at harmony, whilst red was meant to be suffering that Catholics endured.

== See also ==
- Dowdell
