= Wogan (name) =

Wogan is a surname of Welsh origin. Notable people with the surname include:

- Andrew Wogan (born 2005), Irish association football goalkeeper
- Charles Wogan (1684–1754), Irish Jacobite activist
- Christopher Wogan (born 1950), American politician from Pennsylvania
- Edward Wogan (c. 1626–1654), Irish Royalist officer of the Wars of the Three Kingdoms
- John Wogan (1588–1644), Welsh politician
- John Wogan (MP died 1557) (c.1480–1557), Welsh politician
- John Wogan (MP died 1580), (1538–1580), Welsh politician
- John Wogan (Justiciar of Ireland) (died 1321)
- John B. Wogan (1890–1968), United States Army officer
- Larry Wogan (1890–1979), Australian rugby union footballer
- Lewis Wogan (c.1649–1702), High Sheriff of Pembrokeshire
- Richard Wogan (died after 1453), Irish judge and cleric, Lord Chancellor of Ireland
- Terry Wogan (1938–2016), Irish radio DJ and television presenter
- Thomas Wogan (born c,1620), Welsh politician, one of the regicides of Charles I
- Walter de Wogan (died after 1328), Welsh-born Irish administrator, soldier and judge
- William Wogan (Custos Rotulorum) (died 1625), Custos Rotulorum of Pembrokeshire
- William Wogan (politician) (c.1638–1708), Welsh judge and Member of Parliament
- William Wogan (religious writer) (1678–1758), Irish religious writer

== See also ==
- Wogan Philipps, 2nd Baron Milford
