= Robert Dowdall =

Irish judge

Sir Robert Dowdall (died 1482) was an Irish judge who held the office of Chief Justice of the Irish Common Pleas for more than forty years. He is mainly remembered today for the murderous assault on him by Sir James Keating, the Prior of Kilmainham, in 1462.

== Career ==
He was the son of Luke Dowdall of County Louth. The Dowdalls were a Derbyshire family who originated at Dovedale, and came to Ireland in the thirteenth century, where they were mainly based at Newtown and Termonfeckin. Later members of the family included George Dowdall, Archbishop of Armagh, James Dowdall, the Catholic martyr, and his cousin, also James Dowdall, Lord Chief Justice of Ireland.

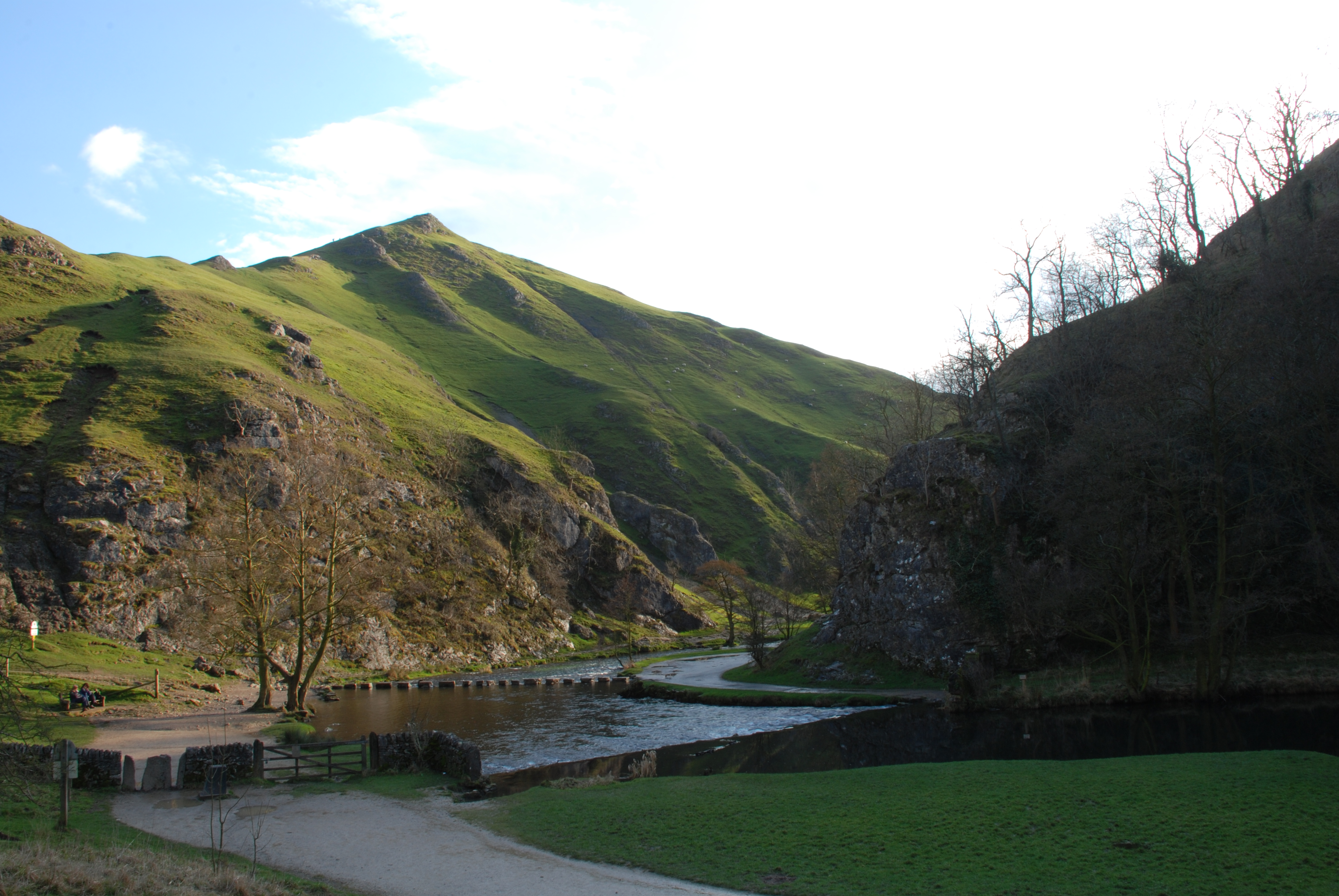
Dovedale, Derbyshire

He was appointed King's Serjeant in 1435 and Chief Justice of the Court of Common Pleas (Ireland) in 1438; he held the latter office until his death in 1482. He was Deputy Treasurer of Ireland in 1461 and was knighted the same year. In 1446, he took a lease of lands in County Louth from Robert FitzRery, the future Attorney General for Ireland, who was later a colleague of Dowdall on the Court of Common Pleas.

== Marriage ==
He married (almost certainly his second marriage) Anne Wogan, daughter and co-heiress with her sister Katherine of John Wogan of Rathcoffey, County Kildare, in 1454. She was the widow of Oliver Eustace of the influential Castlemartin family. She owned substantial dower lands, including Clongowes Wood, but lost Rathcoffey Castle itself, following a bitter inheritance dispute with her cousin Richard Wogan, former Lord Chancellor of Ireland. She also laid claim to the ancestral Wogan lands in Pembrokeshire although her right to inherit these lands was disputed by her sister Katherine and her husband, the Welshman Owen Dunn, or Owain Dwnn. Although Robert and Anne appealed to the King and Council for redress, Owain and Katherine remained in possession of Picton Castle, the Wogan's stronghold in Wales.

Robert resided mainly at Clontarf near Dublin.

Rathcoffey Castle

He was a companion of the Brotherhood of Saint George, a short-lived military order founded by King Edward IV in 1474 for the defence of the Pale.

== Attempted murder of Dowdall by Sir James Keating ==
Dowdall is chiefly remembered for the murderous assault on him in 1462 by Sir James Keating, Prior of the Knights Hospitallers. At Pentecost 1462, Dowdall, who was making a pilgrimage to a holy well 'one of the shrines of the Pale', was attacked 'near Clonliff' (North of Dublin city) by Keating, armed with a sword, and was put in fear of his life. There seems no reason to doubt that the Prior meant to kill him. Dowdall prosecuted Keating before the Irish Parliament, which found the Prior guilty of assault. He was fined £100, and ordered to pay Dowdall 100 marks as compensation, but was able through the use of a technicality to evade making either payment.

The motive for the attack is unknown: Elrington Ball, comparing it to the murder of James Cornwalsh, Chief Baron of the Irish Exchequer, twenty years earlier, argued that crimes of violence were endemic in medieval Ireland. However, equally savage crimes took place in contemporary England, such as the murder in 1455 of the respected lawyer Nicholas Radford by followers of Thomas Courtenay, 6th Earl of Devon, undoubtedly with the Earl's connivance.

Such incidents demonstrate a general breakdown of law and order in both kingdoms in the mid-fifteenth century, which greatly weakened the authority of the English Crown. Keating, despite his clerical office, was clearly a violent and turbulent individual, who dealt with an attempt to remove him as Prior by throwing his intended successor, Marmaduke Langley, into prison, where he died. He was disgraced many years later for his part in the attempt to put the pretender Lambert Simnel on the throne of England, and died in wretched poverty in about 1491.

This was not the only serious crime of which Robert was the victim: in 1455 he and his wife Anne petitioned Parliament for the restoration of their cattle, sheep and goods which had been unlawfully seized.

== Later life ==
In 1474, he was a party to the charter establishing the Dublin Smith's Guild, which ranked third in precedence among the Guilds of the City of Dublin. It can scarcely have gratified him to know that his old enemy Prior Keating was another of the Guild's founders. Two years later he was party to a similar charter setting up the Glovers and Skinners Guild.

In 1478, Dowdall made a gift of 100 marks, to be invested in land or merchandise or loaned out at interest, to Saint Anne's Guild, the leading medieval religious guild in Dublin. The income derived from the investments was to be used to support two priests in Saint Audoen's Church to sing and pray for Dowdall's soul, and after his death to pray for him on each anniversary of his death. He died four years later.

== Descendants ==
His only known wife was Anne Wogan, daughter and co-heiress of John Wogan of Rathcoffey, and widow of Oliver Eustace of Castlemartin. Robert had at least one son, Thomas Dowdall, Master of the Rolls in Ireland, who was already a grown man when his father married Anne. Through Thomas, he was the ancestor of Archbishop George Dowdall and George's nephew James Dowdall, Lord Chief Justice of Ireland. He was also an ancestor of the Dowdall baronets.
