= Richard FitzEustace =

Irish statesman

Arms of Sir Richard FitzEustace: Quarterly or and gules

Sir Richard FitzEustace (c.1380–1445) was an Irish statesman who twice held the office of Lord Chancellor of Ireland.

== Family background ==
He was born about 1380 in Coghlanstown, County Kildare. His father was Sir Maurice FitzEustace, High Sheriff of Kildare in 1386; his mother was Joan, widow of Sir James Delahyde, who sat as one of the two knights of the shire for County Meath in the Irish House of Commons in the Parliament of 1370. Another branch of the Eustace or FitzEustace family later acquired the titles Baron Portlester and Viscount Baltinglass.

== Career ==
He was appointed a Justice of the Peace in 1408, and High Sheriff of Kildare and Constable of Ballymore Eustace in 1414. He was Member of the Irish House of Commons for County Kildare in the Parliament of 1429, and on at least two occasions was entrusted with the task of maintaining good relations with the English Crown, having the title "Messenger to the King". He was knighted before 1421. He held the manor of Newcastle Lyons, Saggart and Esker, all in County Dublin; after his death, these passed to the Portlester branch of the family.

He was appointed Lord Chancellor of Ireland in 1426 but held office for only three months; however he appears to have acted as Deputy Lord Chancellor for the next ten years, may briefly have held office again in 1436, and was reappointed in 1442. He served as Commissioner for the Muster in the same year. In 1426 he petitioned the Council for recompense for his great labours on behalf of the King. In particular, he pleaded that his expenses on Crown service had prevented him from building a fortified house ("fortalice") in the Border country to preserve the peace.

He was a member of the Privy Council of Ireland, and in his last years seems to have been regarded as very much a dependable "elder statesman". He was present at least two important Council meetings: the first was in August 1442, where very serious charges were laid against Richard Wogan, the Lord Chancellor. In consequence, Wogan was deemed to have vacated office and FitzEustace was reappointed Chancellor in his place. He attended the Council again in July 1444, where serious accusations were made against Giles Thorndon, the Lord Treasurer of Ireland.

He died in 1445.

== Family ==
Around 1417, he married Katherine Preston, widow of William Lawless, and of Christopher Holywood of Artane, son of Sir Robert de Holywood. Since Katherine, being a widow, was a Royal ward, Richard was obliged to obtain a royal pardon for marrying her without the Crown's consent; at the same time he was forgiven certain debts due to the Crown. In 1421 they were awarded custody of two-thirds of the lands of Katherine's second husband Christopher Holywood, during the minority of her son Robert Holywood, who came of age in 1422.

Sir Robert FitzEustace, son of Richard and Katherine, was High Sheriff of Kildare in his turn, and may also have served briefly as Lord Chancellor.
