= Thomas Dowdall (judge) =

Irish judge

Thomas Dowdall, also spelt Dowdale, Douedall, or Dowedall, (died c. 1492) was an Irish barrister and judge who held the office of Master of the Rolls in Ireland.

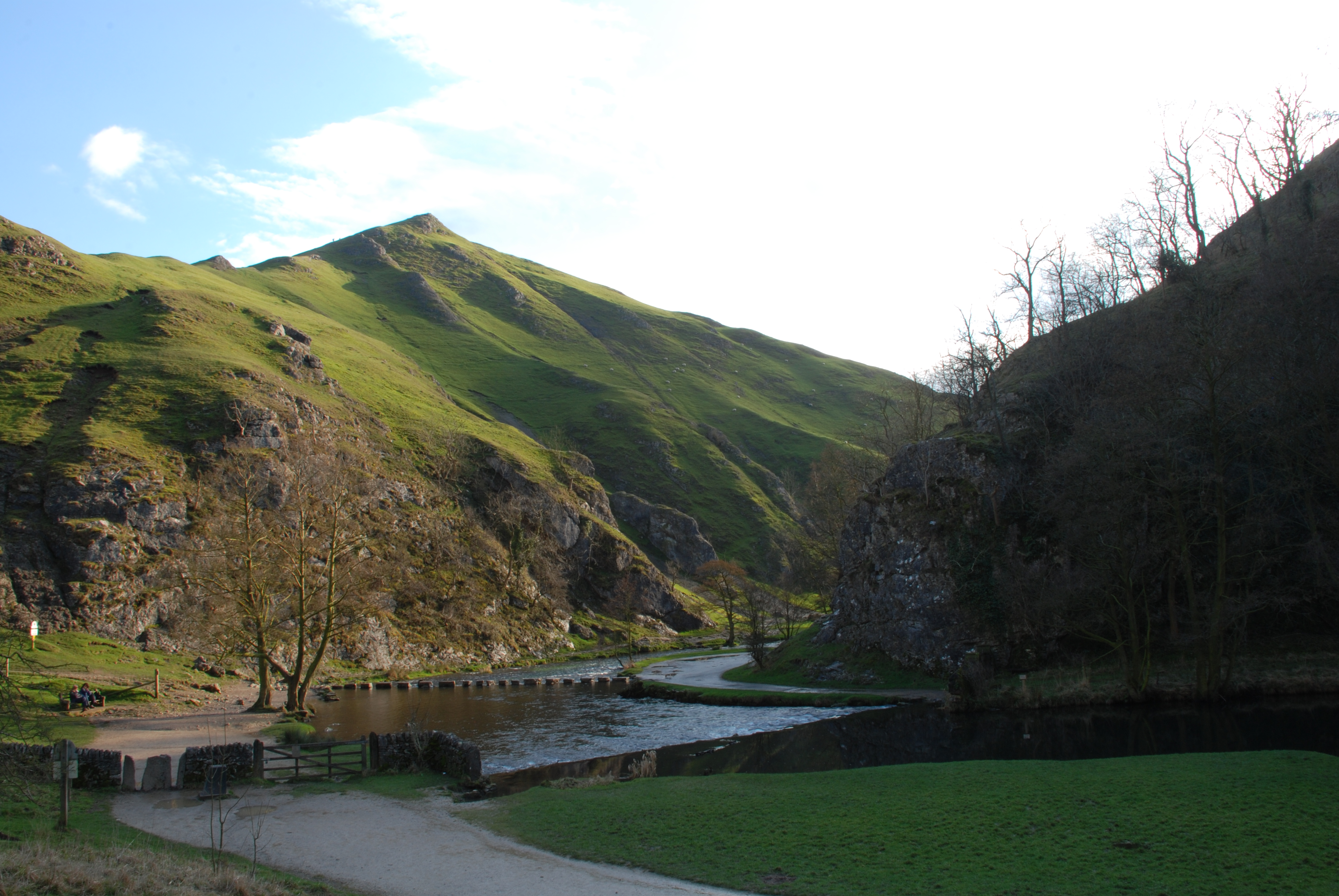
Dovedale, Derbyshire

He was born in County Louth, son of Sir Robert Dowdall, who was for many years Chief Justice of the Irish Common Pleas. After the death of his mother, of whom nothing is known, his father in 1454 remarried Anne Wogan, daughter and co-heiress of John Wogan of Rathcoffey, County Kildare, and widow of Oliver Eustace of Castlemartin. The Dowdall (or Dovedale) family came to Ireland from Dovedale in Derbyshire in the thirteenth century. Sir Thomas Dowdall, who married c.1450 Elizabeth Holywood, daughter of Sir Robert Holywood of Artane, and mother through her previous husband James Nugent of Richard, 2nd Baron Delvin, was probably a close relative of the judge. Elizabeth Hollywood's third husband was Peter Trevers, Dowdall's predecessor as Master of the Rolls, an example of how small the Anglo-Irish ruling class was in that era. Through his stepmother's first marriage, he also had a useful connection to two of the leading families of County Kildare.

He was studying law at Lincoln's Inn in 1459 (Ireland had no law school of its own until 1541), where he was referred to as Thomas Dowdale. He returned to Ireland and was made Serjeant-at-law (Ireland) in 1462: he was confirmed in office by Parliament in December 1470. He was also referred to as King's Attorney, and Pleader. In 1471 he was described as a "counter" (this was an office in the Exchequer of Ireland) and later that year he was appointed Master, or Keeper of the Rolls. He was granted the royal manor of Esker, near Lucan, Dublin, for life: Esker was normally awarded to Crown servants in good standing.

In 1476 he was a party to the royal charter setting up the Glovers and Skinners Guild, and in 1478 he was party to a similar charter setting up the Dublin Baker's Guild (or the Guild of St. Clement and St Anne). He was summoned to England on official business in 1479, when Thomas Archbold, the Attorney General for Ireland, acted as his Deputy. He succeeded to his father's estates in 1482.

Like the great majority of the Anglo-Irish gentry and the High Court judges, he made the mistake of supporting the claims of the pretender Lambert Simnel in 1487 to be the rightful King of England. Simnel's cause was crushed at the Battle of Stoke Field. The victorious King Henry VII was prepared to be magnanimous to the defeated rebels, and Dowdall and all his judicial colleagues received a royal pardon.He probably died in 1492.

James Dowdall, Lord Chief Justice of Ireland 1583–84, was a descendant of Thomas.
