= Thomas Dowdall =

Irish politician (1872–1942)

Teachta Dála
- In office February 1932 – 7 April 1942
- Constituency: Cork Borough

Personal details
- Born: 1872 Gillingham, Kent, England
- Died: 7 April 1942 (aged 69–70) Cork, Ireland
- Party: Fianna Fáil
- Other political affiliations: Cumann na nGaedheal
- Relatives: James Charles Dowdall (brother); Jane Dowdall (sister-in-law)
- Education: Presentation College, Cork

Thomas Patrick Dowdall (1872 – 7 April 1942) was an Irish Fianna Fáil politician and company director.

== Early life ==
He was born at Chatham Barracks, Gillingham, Kent, the son of Charles Dowdall, colour sergeant in the 48th foot, and Margaret Dowdall (née Cassidy) of Bandon, County Cork. He and his brother James were educated at the Presentation College, Grand Parade, Cork; together they then visited Denmark, where they studied butter manufacture. Returning to Cork, fluent in Danish and Swedish, the two joined Dowdall Bros, the creamery business of their uncle J. B. Dowdall, which had extensive business contacts in the Baltic countries. Between 1886 and 1888, J. B. Dowdall was instrumental in building or enlarging thirteen creameries and amalgamating them into a consortium known as Anglo-Irish Creameries.

== Business career ==
After a short time Thomas took charge of the substantial Irish business, and on the death of their uncle the two Dowdall brothers and their cousin J. B. O'Mahoney formed Dowdall, O'Mahoney & Co. (1905). They soon built up an extensive butter business in Cork, with branches in Manchester, London, and Cardiff; the company also manufactured margarine and soap. A founder member of the Cork Industrial Development Association, Thomas Dowdall was a trustee of the Cork chamber of commerce and vice-president (1939–1940) of the Cork incorporated chamber of commerce and shipping. He was the first chairman (1938) of the company that owned The Standard, he played a key role in the revival of this catholic newspaper. He was a benevolent and enlightened employer and citizen; his generosity was considerable and largely conferred anonymously.

== Political career ==
Dowdall was a keen supporter of the Irish Volunteers and later of Sinn Féin; he endorsed the 1921 Anglo-Irish Treaty and used his influence with others to have it ratified. During the Irish Civil War he acted as an intermediary between the warring factions in Cork and became chairman of the Cork Progressive Association. He was honorary treasurer of the Cork city executive of Cumann na nGaedheal, before joining Fianna Fáil with his brother in 1927. In Fianna Fáil he was instrumental in persuading TDs to take their seats in the Dáil and was a founding director of The Irish Press.

He was first elected to Dáil Éireann as a Fianna Fáil Teachta Dála (TD) for the Cork Borough constituency at the 1932 general election. He was re-elected at the 1933, 1937 and 1938 general elections. Dowdall rarely spoke in the Dáil, but he was a strong advocate of re-afforestation, and outside the chamber he was a co-founder of the Forestry Society and contributed towards the publication of John Mackay's The rape of Ireland (1940). He was also in favour of protectionism and the establishment of a merchant navy.

His brother James Charles Dowdall, was a Fianna Fáil senator from 1922 to 1936. Unmarried, Thomas Dowdall lived at 4 Alexandra Terrace, St Luke's, Cork. He died 7 April 1942 in Cork, during the 10th Dáil, no by-election was held for his seat.

| Dáil | Election | Deputy (Party) | Deputy (Party) | Deputy (Party) | Deputy (Party) | Deputy (Party) |
|---|---|---|---|---|---|---|
| 2nd | 1921 | Liam de Róiste (SF) | Mary MacSwiney (SF) | Donal O'Callaghan (SF) | J. J. Walsh (SF) | 4 seats 1921–1923 |
| 3rd | 1922 | Liam de Róiste (PT-SF) | Mary MacSwiney (AT-SF) | Robert Day (Lab) | J. J. Walsh (PT-SF) | 4 seats 1921–1923 |
| 4th | 1923 | Richard Beamish (Ind.) | Mary MacSwiney (Rep) | Andrew O'Shaughnessy (Ind.) | J. J. Walsh (CnaG) | Alfred O'Rahilly (CnaG) |
| 4th | 1924 by-election | Richard Beamish (Ind.) | Mary MacSwiney (Rep) | Andrew O'Shaughnessy (Ind.) | J. J. Walsh (CnaG) | Michael Egan (CnaG) |
| 5th | 1927 (Jun) | John Horgan (NL) | Seán French (FF) | Richard Anthony (Lab) | J. J. Walsh (CnaG) | Barry Egan (CnaG) |
| 6th | 1927 (Sep) | W. T. Cosgrave (CnaG) | Seán French (FF) | Richard Anthony (Lab) | Hugo Flinn (FF) | Barry Egan (CnaG) |
| 7th | 1932 | W. T. Cosgrave (CnaG) | Thomas Dowdall (FF) | Richard Anthony (Ind.) | Hugo Flinn (FF) | William Desmond (CnaG) |
| 8th | 1933 | W. T. Cosgrave (CnaG) | Thomas Dowdall (FF) | Richard Anthony (Ind.) | Hugo Flinn (FF) | William Desmond (CnaG) |
| 9th | 1937 | W. T. Cosgrave (FG) | Thomas Dowdall (FF) | Richard Anthony (Ind.) | Hugo Flinn (FF) | 4 seats 1937–1948 |
| 10th | 1938 | W. T. Cosgrave (FG) | Thomas Dowdall (FF) | James Hickey (Lab) | Hugo Flinn (FF) | 4 seats 1937–1948 |
| 11th | 1943 | W. T. Cosgrave (FG) | Frank Daly (FF) | Richard Anthony (Ind.) | Séamus Fitzgerald (FF) | 4 seats 1937–1948 |
| 12th | 1944 | William Dwyer (Ind.) | Frank Daly (FF) | Richard Anthony (Ind.) | Walter Furlong (FF) | 4 seats 1937–1948 |
| 12th | 1946 by-election | Patrick McGrath (FF) | Frank Daly (FF) | Richard Anthony (Ind.) | Walter Furlong (FF) | 4 seats 1937–1948 |
| 13th | 1948 | Patrick McGrath (FF) | Michael Sheehan (Ind.) | James Hickey (NLP) | Jack Lynch (FF) | Thomas F. O'Higgins (FG) |
| 14th | 1951 | Patrick McGrath (FF) | Seán McCarthy (FF) | James Hickey (Lab) | Jack Lynch (FF) | Thomas F. O'Higgins (FG) |
| 14th | 1954 by-election | Patrick McGrath (FF) | Seán McCarthy (FF) | James Hickey (Lab) | Jack Lynch (FF) | Stephen Barrett (FG) |
| 15th | 1954 | Patrick McGrath (FF) | Anthony Barry (FG) | Seán Casey (Lab) | Jack Lynch (FF) | Stephen Barrett (FG) |
| 15th | 1956 by-election | John Galvin (FF) | Anthony Barry (FG) | Seán Casey (Lab) | Jack Lynch (FF) | Stephen Barrett (FG) |
| 16th | 1957 | John Galvin (FF) | Gus Healy (FF) | Seán Casey (Lab) | Jack Lynch (FF) | Stephen Barrett (FG) |
| 17th | 1961 | John Galvin (FF) | Anthony Barry (FG) | Seán Casey (Lab) | Jack Lynch (FF) | Stephen Barrett (FG) |
| 17th | 1964 by-election | Sheila Galvin (FF) | Anthony Barry (FG) | Seán Casey (Lab) | Jack Lynch (FF) | Stephen Barrett (FG) |
| 18th | 1965 | Gus Healy (FF) | Pearse Wyse (FF) | Seán Casey (Lab) | Jack Lynch (FF) | Stephen Barrett (FG) |
| 18th | 1967 by-election | Gus Healy (FF) | Pearse Wyse (FF) | Seán French (FF) | Jack Lynch (FF) | Stephen Barrett (FG) |
| 19th | 1969 | Constituency abolished. See Cork City North-West and Cork City South-East | | | | |
