= Robert FitzEustace =

Irish landowner and politician

Sir Robert FitzEustace (c.1420–1486) was an Irish landowner and politician of the fifteenth century.

He was born at Coghlanstown, County Kildare, son of Sir Richard FitzEustace, who served briefly as Lord Chancellor of Ireland, and Katherine Preston, widow of William Lawless and of Christopher Holywood of Artane, Dublin. Rowland FitzEustace, 1st Baron Portlester was his cousin; Rowland was one of the dominant Irish statesmen of his time, and Robert was a loyal supporter of Portlester and his son-in-law, Gerald FitzGerald, the "Great Earl" of Kildare.

The office of Constable of the Castle of Ballymore Eustace was in effect hereditary in the FitzEustace family; Robert was appointed Constable on his father's death in 1445, but was dismissed from office for a time, due to his refusal to live in the castle. Like his father, he was High Sheriff of Kildare in 1456, and he was one of the original members of the Brotherhood of Saint George, a short-lived military guild charged with the defence of the Pale. At his death in 1486 he was one of the largest landowners in Kildare (despite having been imprisoned for debt in the 1450s)

An Act of the Irish Parliament of 1472 conferred the office of Lord Chancellor of Ireland on Robert FitzEustace and John Tapton jointly. O'Flanagan states that nothing is known of either man, although Tapton is described in the statute as a "clerk". Since Robert FitzEustace of Coghlanstown was the son of a Lord Chancellor, and it was not unusual for members of the same family to hold office, he may well be the Robert referred to; on the other hand, as the Dictionary of National Biography suggests, the name Robert may be a slip for his cousin Rowland FitzEustace who held the office two years later. He was party to the royal charter of 1478 which set up the Dublin Baker's Guild (the Guild of St. Clement and St. Anne).

Robert had at least seven surviving children: his eldest son and heir Sir Maurice FitzEustace, James, Richard, Oliver, John, Anne and Margaret. Margaret married Robert Talbot of Belgard. Maurice married his cousin Joan FitzEustace, daughter of Lord Portlester and widow of Richard Plunkett, 2nd Baron of Dunsany. Anne married Richard Eustace, another cousin of the Baltinglass branch.
