= Ballymore Eustace =

Town in County Kildare, Leinster, Ireland

Ballymore Eustace An Baile Mór
- Town
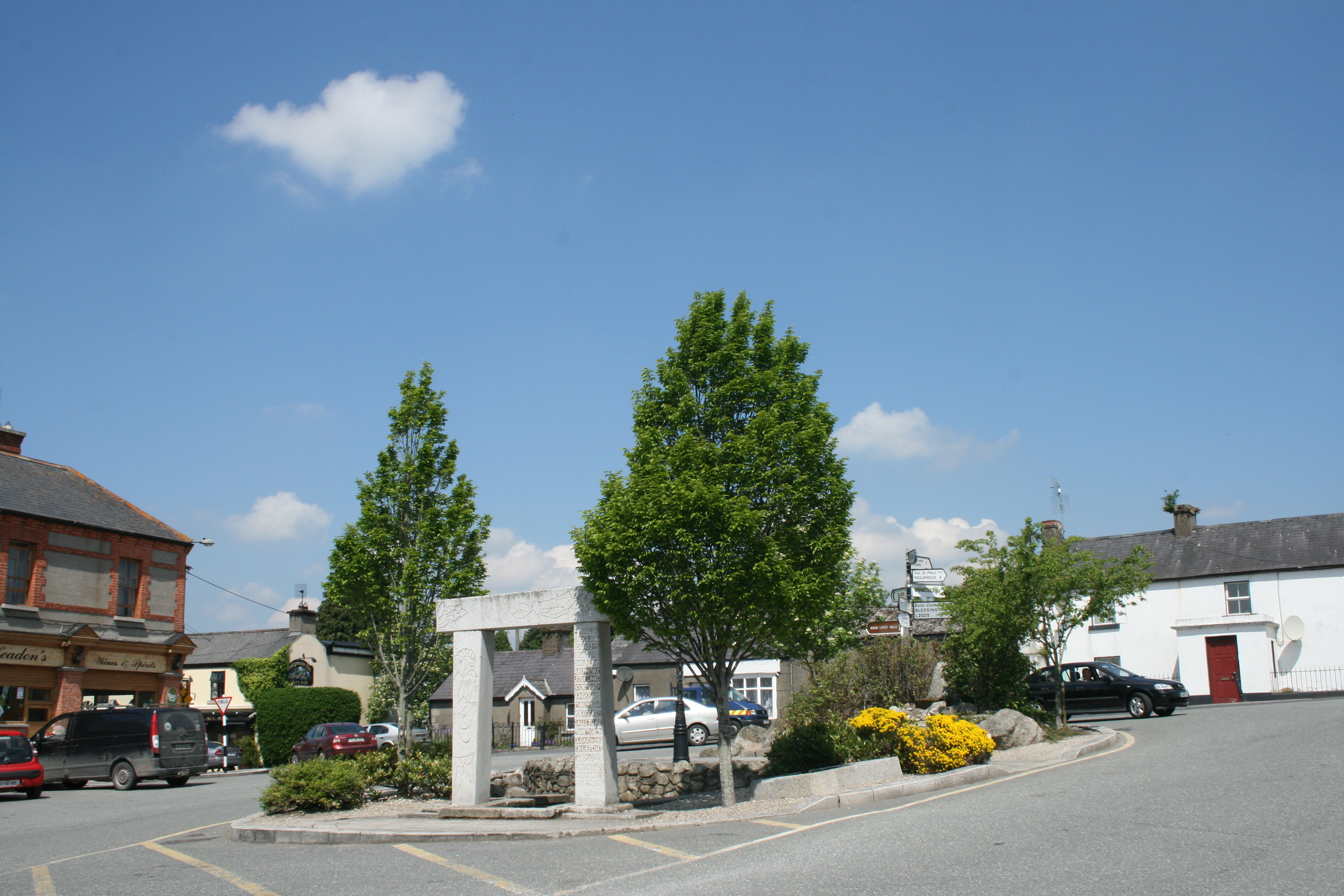
- Ballymore Eustace town square

- Location in Ireland
- Coordinates: 53°08′01″N 6°36′52″W
- Country: Ireland
- Province: Leinster
- County: County Kildare

Population (2022)
  - Total: 689
- Time zone: UTC+0 (WET)
  - Summer (DST): UTC-1 (IST (WEST))
- Irish Grid Reference: N924094

Ballymore Eustace (Irish: An Baile Mór, meaning 'the big town') is a small town situated in County Kildare in Ireland, although until 1836 it lay within an exclave of County Dublin. It lies close to the border with County Wicklow. The town is in a civil parish of the same name.

The town's name, which is frequently shortened to "Ballymore" in everyday usage, derives from the Irish An Baile Mór ("the big town") with the addition – to distinguish it from several other Ballymores in Ireland – of the family name (Fitz)Eustace. A fuller version of the town's official name in Irish is Baile Mór na nIústasach ("big town of the Eustaces").

Prior to the Norman invasion the area was known as Críoch Ua Cormaic.

== Location and access ==
Ballymore Eustace is located at the junction of the R411 and R413 regional roads, on the River Liffey, over which the R411 is carried by a relatively rare seven-arch bridge. It had a population of 689 at the 2022 census, a decrease of 21% compared to the 2011 results. The town is served by Dublin Bus, with route number 65 running four times daily (Monday-Friday), seven times (Saturday) and six times (Sunday). The journey takes approximately 1 hour 30 minutes depending on traffic, and terminates in Dublin city centre at Poolbeg Street.

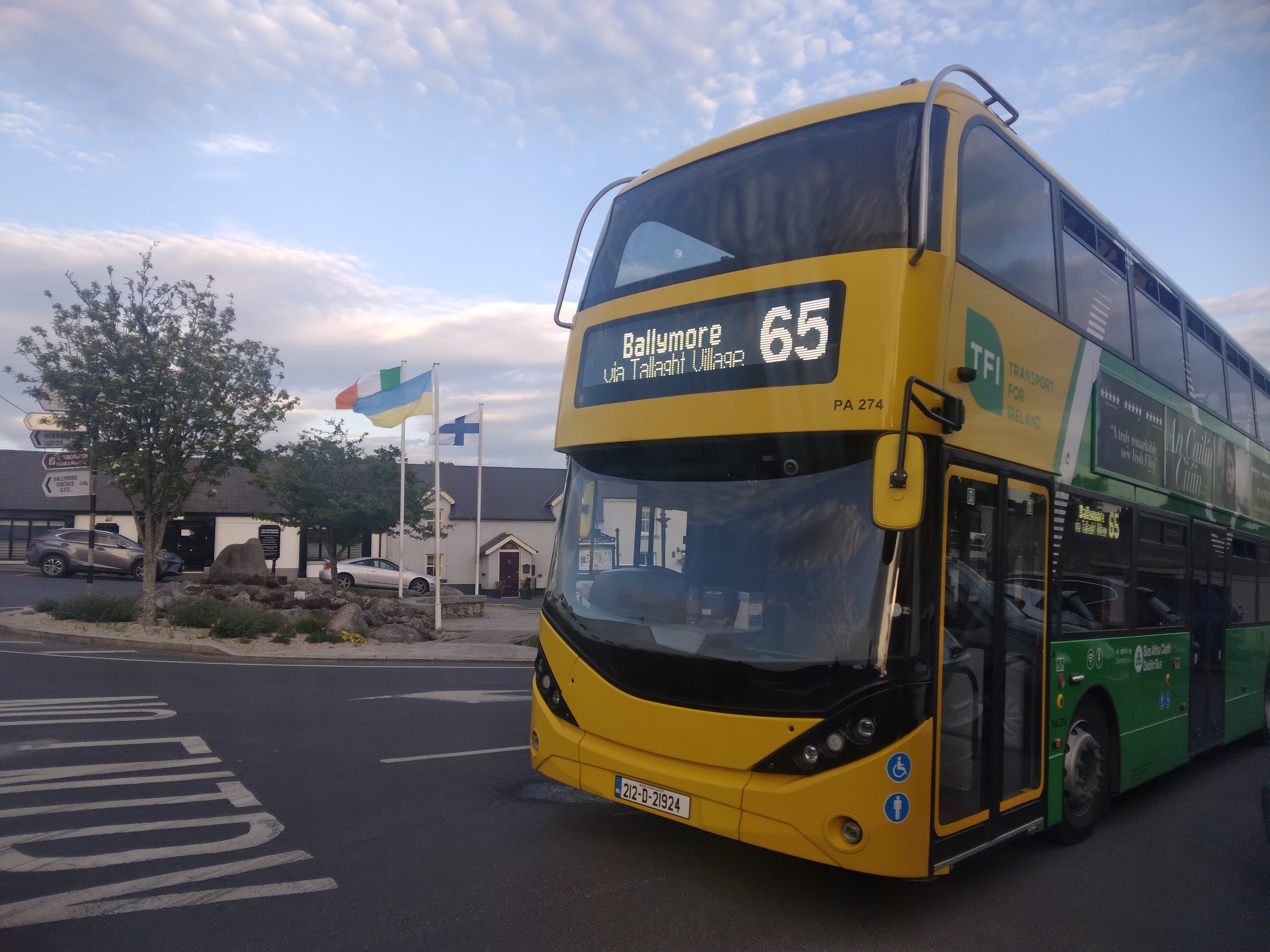
A Dublin Bus on the route 65 service, pictured in the town square, which connects Ballymore to Dublin city centre multiple times a day

The town has been connected by public transport to Naas and Sallins railway station since August 2021, when a public bus service was established by TFI Local Link Kildare South Dublin. As of June 2024, the route is named the 885, and connects Baltinglass to Sallins via Ballymore, Blessington and Naas. The arrivals at Sallins railway station are scheduled to link in with departures to, and arrivals from, Heuston railway station in Dublin.

== History ==
=== Medieval church ===
The first reference to a church is in 1192, but the existence of two granite high crosses and early medieval grave slabs in St. John's church graveyard indicates a pre-Norman church site. The larger of the two crosses dates to the 10th or 11th century. It is over two metres tall and consists of a solid ring with short arms on a narrow shaft on a large undecorated rectangular base. The head and shaft were carved from a single block of granite. There is an inscription commemorating the re-erection of the cross in 1689 by Ambrose Walls. The smaller of the high crosses also likely dates to the 10th or 11th century and is in poor repair as most of the head has been broken off.

=== Early history ===
Historical population
Year	Pop.	±%
1580	93	—
1585	120	+29.0%
1600	155	+29.2%
1610	214	+38.1%
1653	257	+20.1%
1659	389	+51.4%
1788	648	+66.6%
1801	676	+4.3%
1811	688	+1.8%
1813	697	+1.3%
1821	760	+9.0%
1831	841	+10.7%
1841	936	+11.3%
1851	673	−28.1%
1861	674	+0.1%
1871	719	+6.7%
1881	629	−12.5%
1891	616	−2.1%
1901	511	−17.0%
1911	447	−12.5%
1926	349	−21.9%
1936	338	−3.2%
1946	329	−2.7%
1951	340	+3.3%
1956	381	+12.1%
1961	348	−8.7%
1966	405	+16.4%
1971	433	+6.9%
1979	512	+18.2%
1981	545	+6.4%
1986	575	+5.5%
1991	625	+8.7%
1996	719	+15.0%
2002	786	+9.3%
2006	725	−7.8%
2011	872	+20.3%
2022	689	−21.0%

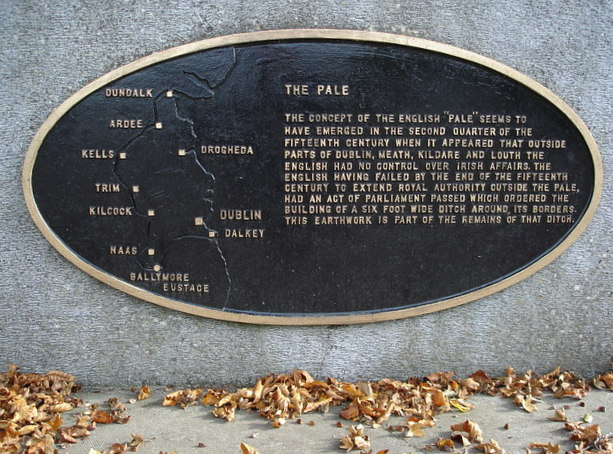
Modern plaque near Ballymore Eustace marks the southern extreme of the Pale

Ballymore Eustace in the 13th century (at the time simply known as Ballymore) was the site of a castle, which in 1244 was granted an eight-day fair to be held on site by Henry III. The parish and the town were part of a manor owned by the Archbishop of Dublin. Thomas Fitzoliver FitzEustace was granted a salary of £10 by the Archbishop for his work as constable and the upkeep of the castle in 1373, and his family came to be associated with the town, lending it its present name.

Several of Thomas' descendants also held the office of Constable, including his grandson Sir Richard FitzEustace (appointed 1414) and his great-grandson Sir Robert FitzEustace (appointed 1445). No trace of the castle exists today, but the importance of Ballymore then is underlined by the fact that Parliament was held there in 1389.

=== The Pale ===
In 1429, a Pale Statute of King Henry VI offered a subsidy of £10 towards the construction of castles "sufficiently embattled or fortified of at least 20 feet long by 16 feet wide by 40 feet in height", after which many were built. The earthen rampart of the Pale ditch was constructed from 1488 to 1494, and was about four metres in height.

Ballymore was a border town of the Pale, which gave it strategic importance in the area, but also lead to its raiding by local Gaelic clans such as the O'Tooles and O'Byrnes from the uplands of the nearby Wicklow Mountains.

In 1487-8, Archbishop Alen's Register described the line of the Pale thus:

And in the third yere of King Henrie the seventhe, by acte of Parliament in Drogheda holden the friday after the Epiphanie, the bundes if the iiij obedient shires within the Macre distinct from the Marches were limite with in the countie of Dublin from Miryonge (Merrion) (inclusive) to the water of Dodor, by the neve diche (ditch) to Tassagarde, Rathcowle, Kilhele, Rathmor and Ballymor (Ballymore), and so from thens to the countie of Kildare etc.

The remains of Close Hill motte

=== Woolen trade ===
Ballymore was a key location on the 'woolpack road', along which woolpacks from the Curragh and from west Wicklow were transported to Dublin, via Rathcoole, from a very early date. The Manor of Ballymore had been involved in this trade, including in that of wool weaving. The earliest tuck mill in Ireland that has been definitively dated lay on the lands of Ballymore Manor, at Ardenode, and is dated to 1276–7. Ballymore acted as a wool collection and trading centre for vast mountain areas to its east, including the King's River valley which fed into the Liffey.

=== Barony of Uppercross ===
The town and surrounding lands formed for centuries one of three adjacent exclaves of the barony of Uppercross, County Dublin. These lands, originally part of Dublin because they belonged to religious foundations there, were among the last such exclaves in Ireland, being merged into Kildare only in 1836.

=== 1798 Rebellion ===
The town was the scene of one of the first clashes of the 1798 rebellion when the British garrison were attacked by United Irish rebels on 23 May but managed to defeat the attack in the Battle of Ballymore-Eustace. Several buildings including the Protestant church were burnt during the attack.

=== Industry ===
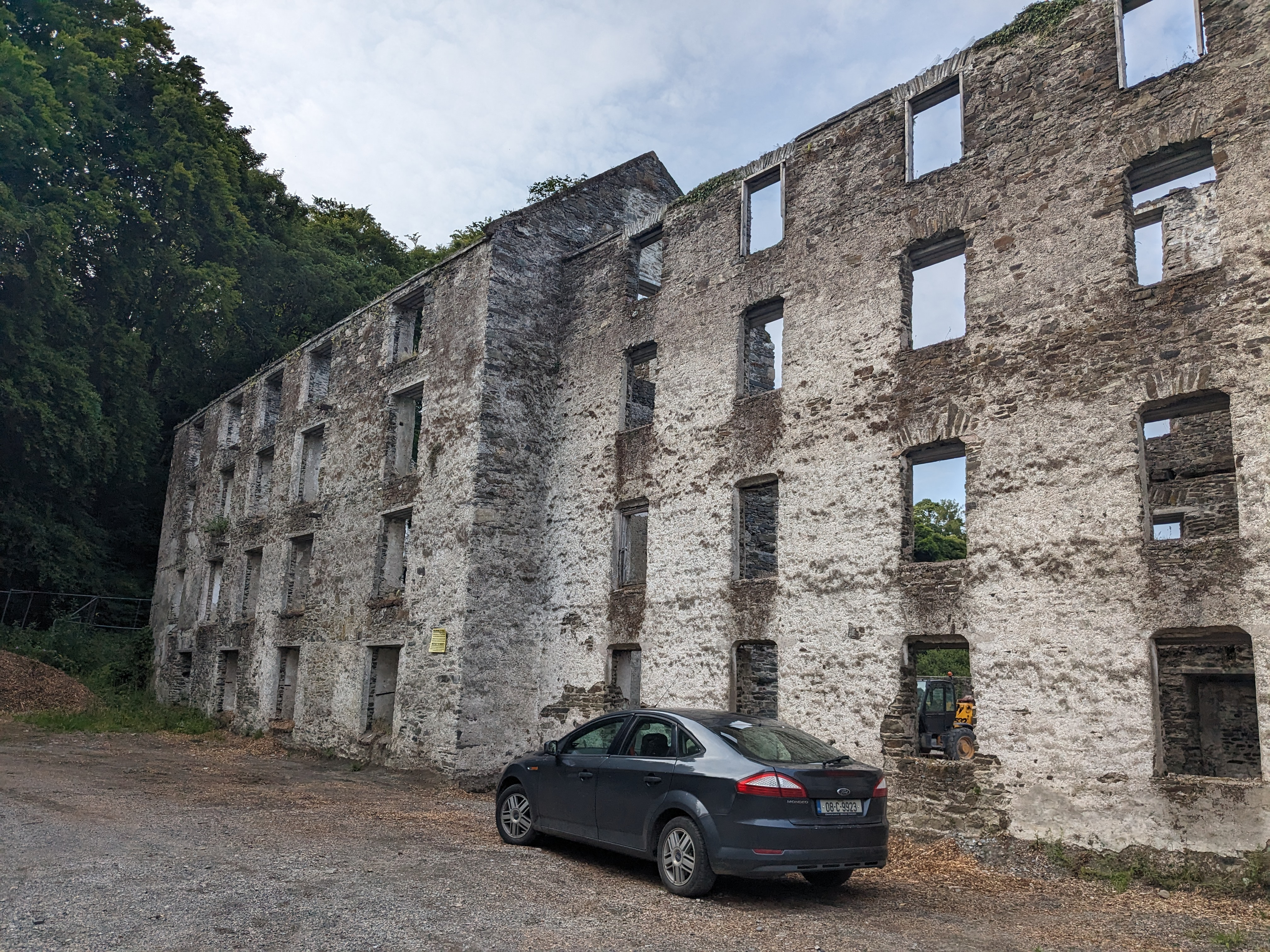
Ruins of the woollen mill, 2023

In the 19th century, the town's largest source of employment was a cotton mill (owned by the Gallagher family), the ruins of which still stand by the river at a spot known as the "pike hole". Although the woollen mill building complex dates to 1802, there has been a history of milling since the 12th century as Archbishop John Comyn was recorded to receive income from a mill in the town as well as other areas. This mill employed approximately 700 people with 150 machines in 1815. A row of single-storey houses were built nearby to accommodate a number of their families – this terrace today known as "Weaver's row", running alongside and down the hill from the local Roman Catholic parish church.

== Surroundings ==
Near the town are the Blessington Lakes, or Poulaphouca Reservoir, created artificially in the 1940s by the damming of the river Liffey at Poulaphouca (the "Devil's hole") which was done to generate electricity by the Electricity Supply Board (ESB), and also to create a reservoir for the supply of water for the city of Dublin. The water is treated at a major treatment plant, the Water Treatment Works at Ballymore Eustace run by Dublin City Council. Golden Falls lake is also in the area, downstream from Poulaphouca Dam.

Also nearby is Russborough House, which houses the Beit art collection, much of which was donated to the state by Sir Alfred Lane Beit, including works by Goya, Vermeer and Rubens.

The area has also been used as a filming location by the film industry. The 1959 film Shake Hands With the Devil was filmed in and around the town. Some of the battle scenes in Mel Gibson's (1995) film, Braveheart, were filmed around Ballymore Eustace. The 2003 film King Arthur was also mostly shot in the village. This resulted in a 1 km long mock-up of Hadrian's Wall being constructed in a field outside of the village during 2003. This was disassembled and the field was returned to its original state. The Irish short film Six Shooter (2004) also shot scenes at Mountcashel, in Ballymore Eustace.

== Amenities ==
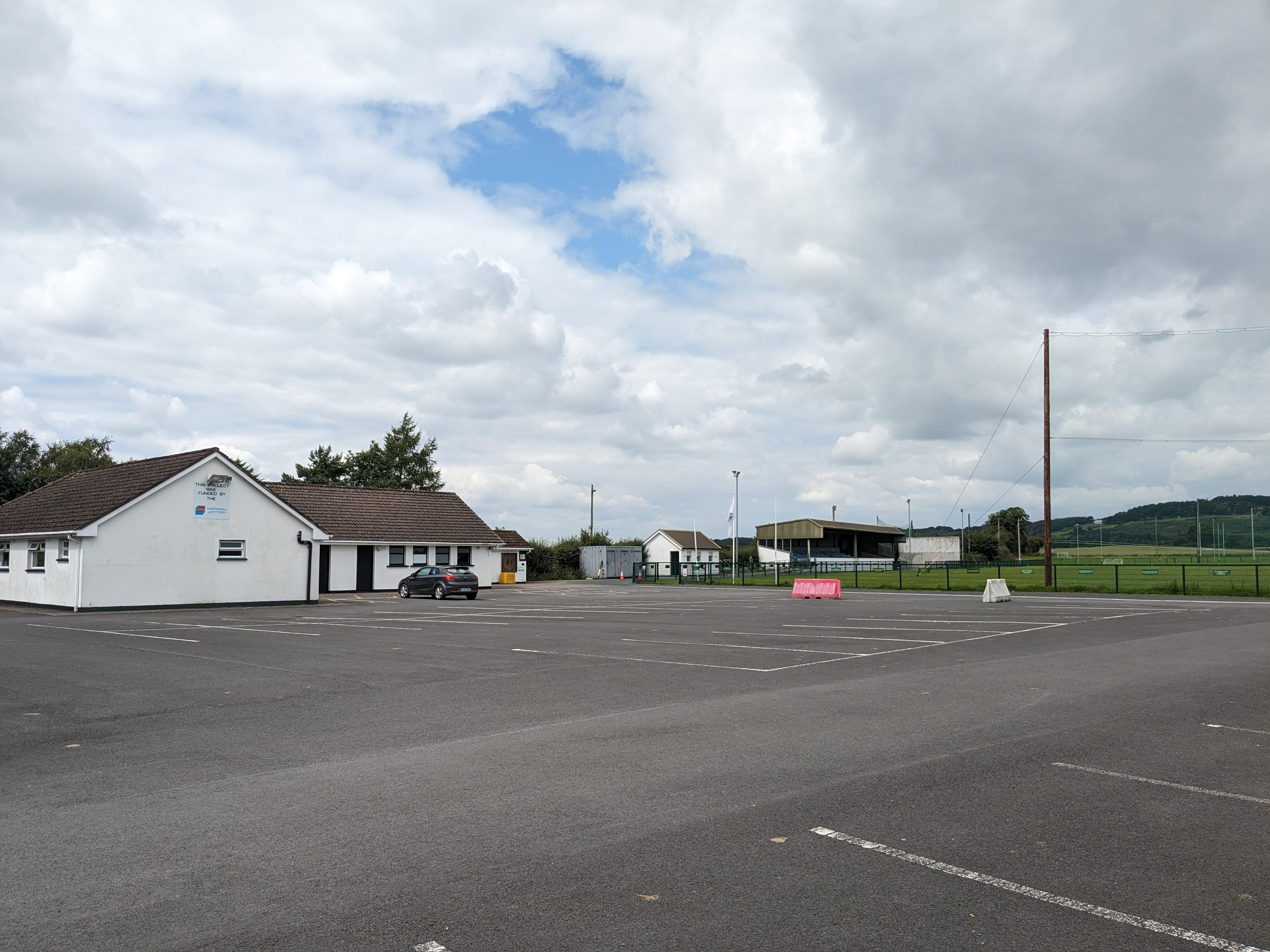
Ballymore Eustace GAA grounds

Wolfe Tone Band Hall on the eastern side of the town was built in 2000 and replaced an earlier 1906 building. The hall is named after Irish revolutionary Wolfe Tone and home to the 'Wolfe Tone Brass and Reed Band' established in 1875. In the past the hall was used as a concert hall and cinema, and the present hall is also put to many varied community uses.

Ballymore Eustace GAA club was founded in 1887. The club grounds can be found on the outskirts of the east side of the village. Facilities include a club house, playing pitches, spectator stand, and parking.

== Geep ==
In April 2014, local farmer and publican Paddy Murphy (who was rearing only white-faced Cheviot sheep at the time) noticed that a sheep–goat hybrid, or "geep", had been born on his farm. "I only have white-faced Cheviot sheep" he said, "and when this one came out it was black". Later the same month he was reported as mentioning that he had seen a goat mating with a sheep earlier in the year, but had assumed "nothing would come of it". Murphy confirmed that the newly born geep appeared to be healthy and "thriving" and was even able to run faster than other lambs that were born around the same time.

In most cases, the cross between a sheep and a goat is stillborn, but in this instance the animal had survived. The unnamed offspring, with its "coarse coat of a lamb and the long legs and horns of a goat", was reported to be in good health. The Irish Farmers Journal reported that it was the first time in its history that it had reported the birth of a healthy geep in Ireland. The crossbreed was said to be extremely unusual, and a charity competition was launched to name the newborn animal. The event gained international attention and was reported by Time, ABC News, and BBC News amongst others. As of April 2022 the animal was still alive and healthy.

== People ==
Former or current residents of the town have included:

- Maurice Monsignor Browne (1892–1979), parish priest of Ballymore Eustace, County Kildare, and Hollywood, County Wicklow, and author of plays Prelude to Victory (1950), as well as novels In Monavalla (1963), From a Presbytery Window (1971), and The Big Sycamore.
- Bobby Coonan (1940–2007), six time Irish National Hunt champion jockey (1967 to 1972)
- Sir Richard FitzEustace (c. 1380–1445), Irish statesman who was appointed constable of Ballymore Eustace in 1414.
- Adam Jackson (1929–1989), Irish champion greyhound racing trainer and champion trainer of Great Britain who was born in the town.
- Thomas Le Ban Kennedy (1813–1900), Dean of Clogher from 1873 to 1899 and served curacies in Aghancon, Ballymore Eustace and Sutton, Cheshire.
- William Penn (1644–1718), Quaker and founder of the Province of Pennsylvania, visited Ballymore Eustace in June 1670.
- Martin Gale (born 1949), painter.

== See also ==
- List of towns and villages in Ireland
- Barretstown Castle
