= Dowdell =

Dowdell is a surname. Notable people with the surname include:

- Dante Dowdell (born 2005), American football player
- Elizabeth Caroline Dowdell (1829-1909), American leader of women's organizations
- James R. Dowdell (1847–1921), American jurist and the 20th Chief Justice of the Alabama Supreme Court
- John E. Dowdell (born 1955), United States District Judge on the United States District Court for the Northern District of Oklahoma
- James F. Dowdell (1818–1871), second President of the East Alabama College, now known as Auburn University and a U.S. Representative from Alabama
- Jeff Dowdell (born 1987), Australian professional basketball player
- Rel Dowdell, American screenwriter, film director, film producer, and English/screenwriting educator
- Robert Dowdell (1932–2018), American actor
- Shanavia Dowdell (born 1987), American professional basketball player
- Zabian Dowdell (born 1984), American professional basketball player

== See also ==
- Dowdall
