= James Dowdall (judge) =

Irish judge

Sir James Dowdall (died 1584) was an Irish judge of the Elizabethan era who briefly held office as Lord Chief Justice of Ireland. He should not be confused with James Dowdall, the Catholic martyr, who was his cousin.

== Early career ==
He was born in County Louth, eldest son of Christopher Dowdall, and nephew of George Dowdall (died 1558), Archbishop of Armagh. His mother was Thomasine Cusack, daughter of John Cusack of Cussington and his first wife Alison de Wellesley, and sister of Sir Thomas Cusack, Lord Chancellor of Ireland. James was something of a favourite of his uncle Thomas, who encouraged him to pursue a legal career.

The Dowdall family, originally called Dovedale, came to Ireland from the valley of Dovedale in Derbyshire, from which they took their name. Their main estates were at Newtown and Termonfeckin, both in County Louth. Other notable family members included Sir Robert Dowdall, Chief Justice of the Irish Common Pleas in the previous century, and Robert's son Thomas Dowdall, Master of the Rolls in Ireland.

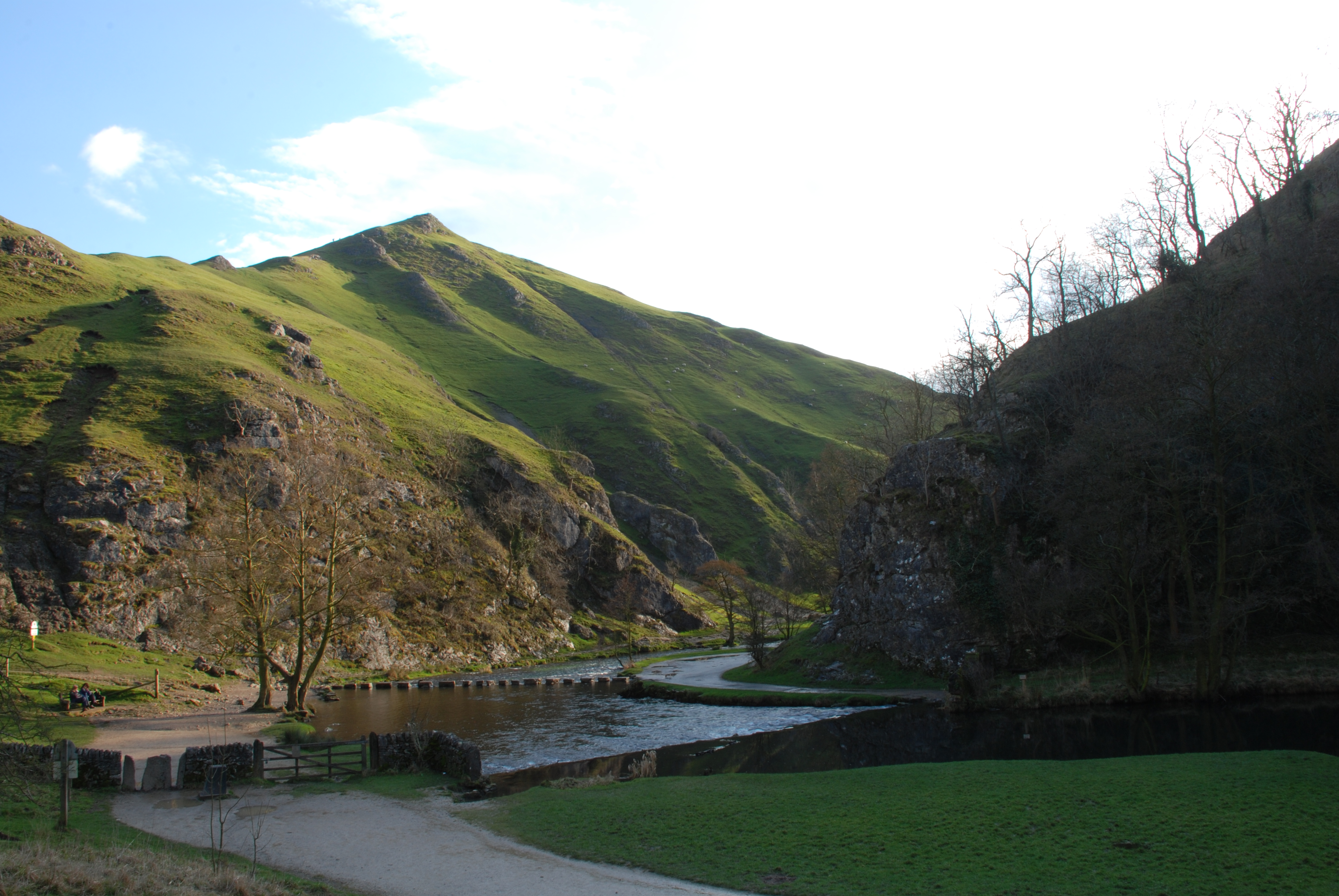
Dovedale, Derbyshire

James entered Lincoln's Inn before 1549; an entry in the Inn's books survives from 1554 stating that he was ordered to shave his beard.

Mary I appointed him Principal Solicitor for Ireland in 1554 and Elizabeth I confirmed him in office and later gave him an annuity for his diligence in attending the Court of Castle Chamber (the Irish equivalent of Star Chamber). He resided mainly at Knock in County Louth.

== Family ==
He married Elizabeth Thunder, a member of a prominent Dublin merchant family (their unusual surname is thought to derive from the French Tonnerre). The Francis Thunder, a merchant of Dublin, who was granted a coat of arms in 1619, presumably belonged to the same family. They had one daughter Ellen, who married John Barnewall. Elizabeth was still alive in 1587, when Sir Henry Colley sued her as the executrix of her husband's estate, for debts which Dowdall had incurred by standing surety for his brother Patrick.

== Later career ==
He was appointed a justice of the Court of Queen's Bench (Ireland) in 1565 and was transferred to the Court of Common Pleas (Ireland) in 1577; he was also appointed Chief Justice of Munster, and sat on the Royal Commission to establish the government of that province. He was chosen for several diplomatic missions over the years, and conducted negotiations on behalf of the English Crown with Shane O'Neill and with the Earl of Desmond.

In 1583 he was knighted and appointed Lord Chief Justice, but died the following year. According to Elrington Ball he was highly esteemed by his colleagues, and exercised a powerful influence on his colleagues, especially in Ulster. Elizabeth I as she made clear in the patent appointing him, admired him greatly, although her first choice as the new Lord Chief Justice had been Sir Lucas Dillon, the Chief Baron of the Irish Exchequer, who was something of a royal favourite. Dillon, however, preferred to remain as Chief Baron, so that Dowdall, who was recommended by the Privy Council of Ireland and by Dillon himself, and whom the Queen herself praised for his "good service" was the obvious choice for Lord Chief Justice. Her praise for Dowdall is interesting as in general she had a very poor opinion of her Irish Law Officers, deploying their "default and inefficiency", and has a practice of replacing them with English lawyers whenever a vacancy arose.

Legal offices
Preceded by John Plunket	Lord Chief Justice of Ireland; 1583–1584	Succeeded by Robert Gardiner
