= Walter de Wogan =

Soldier, administrator and judge (14th century)

Walter de Wogan (died after 1328) was a Welsh-born Irish administrator, soldier and judge of the early fourteenth century.

He was a younger son of John Wogan (died 1321), who was Justiciar of Ireland from 1295 to 1313. Originally a Pembrokeshire man, John acquired substantial estates at Rathcoffey in County Kildare. Much about the details of his family life is disputed, including the names and number of his children, although Walter's existence and paternity are not in doubt. He was probably a child of his father's first marriage to Joan Picton, daughter of Sir William Picton of Picton Castle, Pembrokeshire.

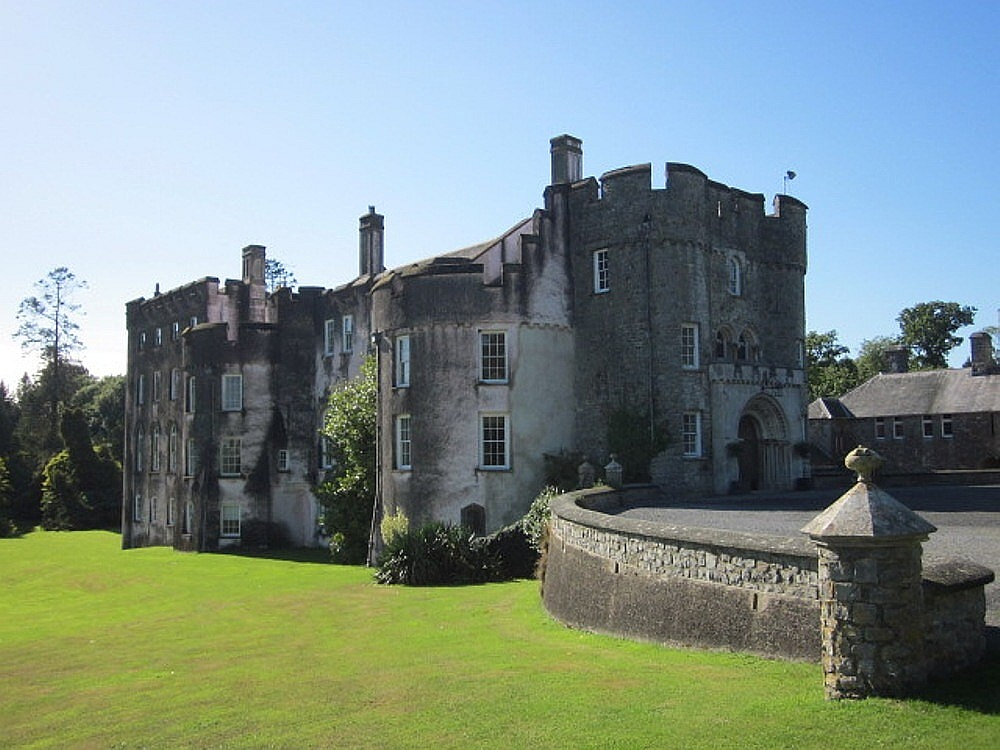
Picton Castle, which came into the Wogan family through marriage

Walter gave good service to the English Crown during the Bruce campaign in Ireland of 1315-18. He was appointed a justice of the Justiciar's Court in 1318, and became second justice of the Court in 1324. He also spent some time in Wales on the King's business. He was appointed Escheator of Ireland in 1328, charged with ensuring the reversion to the Crown of all lands whose tenant in chief had died without heirs. His date of death is not recorded. His brother John was also a justice of the Irish Justiciar's Court.

== Sources ==
- Ball, F. Elrington The Judges in Ireland 1221-1921 London John Murray 1926
- Mackay, Ronan "Wogan, John" Cambridge Dictionary of Irish Biography
