= Martin Gale =

Irish painter

- Born: 1949 (age 76–77); Worcester, England
- Education: National College of Art and Design
- Known for: Painting
- Style: Photorealism
- Elected: Aosdána
- Website: martingale.ie

Martin Gale RHA (born 1949) is an English-born Irish painter.

== Early life ==
Gale was born in Worcester in 1949. His father was a jockey and handicapper, and his mother also rode in point-to-point races. He and his family later moved to Ireland, where he attended Newbridge College and Blackrock Academy on Lower Mount Street, Dublin.

== Career ==
Gale studied at the National College of Art and Design (NCAD, Dublin). His first solo show was two years after he graduated, at the Neptune Gallery. He represented Ireland at the Biennale de Paris in 1980. He was elected to Aosdána in 1982 and the Royal Hibernian Academy in 1996. A retrospective of his work was held at the Royal Hibernian Academy's Gallagher Gallery in 2004, moving to the Ulster Museum later.

Gale is known for his photorealistic landscapes with human and animal figures. According to Aidan Dunne of The Irish Times, "Much of his work consists of depicting individuals in rural settings, and he manages these tableaux with a certain theatrical flair. There's usually an element of tension. That tension can emerge from the demeanour of the figure, with intimations of inner conflict or troubling memories, or the figure's relationship to the setting. Gale's tonal range is generally broad, from almost-piercing lights to chill, earthy darks, and there is a hard-edged, linear quality to his painting […] he does not pander to received images of an Irish picturesque."

== Personal life ==
Gale is based in Ballymore Eustace, County Kildare; he has lived in the countryside for almost all of his life. He is a close friend of fellow artist Charles Tyrrell.
