= Dowdall baronets =

The Dowdall Baronetcy, of Athlumney was a title in the Baronetage of Ireland created on 24 November 1663 for Luke Dowdall.

The family was descended from Sir Robert Dowdall (died 1482), Chief Justice of the Irish Common Pleas. The first baronet was a supporter of Charles I of England in Ireland and was a beneficiary of the Act of Settlement 1662. He remained loyal to James II following the Glorious Revolution. A Roman Catholic, he joined James' army in Ireland but died in 1689, before the conclusion of the Williamite War in Ireland. He was succeeded by his son, Laurence Dowdall, but the first baronet was attainted posthumously by William III of England on 6 April 1691. Following the second baronet's death in 1700, his brothers Daniel and James claimed succession to the forfeited baronetcy but without legal legitimacy. This line became extinct in 1742.

== Dowdall baronets, of Athlumney (1663) ==
- Sir Luke Dowdall, 1st Baronet (died 1689)
- Sir Laurence Dowdall, 2nd Baronet (died 1700) (forfeit 1691)
- Sir Daniel Dowdall, 3rd Baronet (died 1729), claimant
- Sir James Dowdall, 4th Baronet (died 1742), claimant
