= St. John's Church, Ballymore Eustace =

19th-century church in Ireland

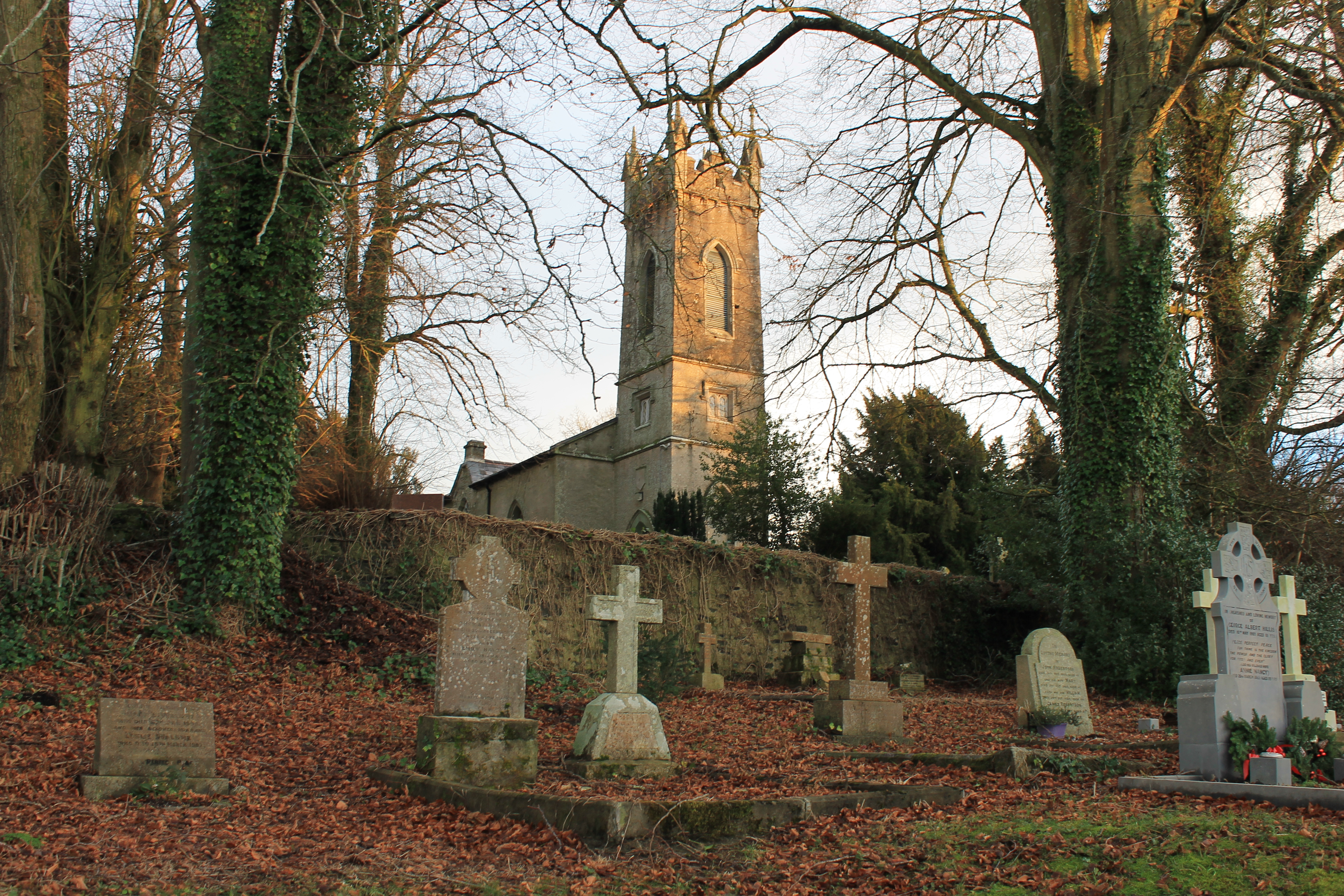
- The church in midwinter

- Location within Ireland
- 53.1314°N 6.6064°W
- Location: Ballymore Eustace; County Kildare; W91 NP38
- Country: Ireland
- Denomination: Church of Ireland
- Website: dublin.anglican.org/parishes/blessington-and-manor-kilbride-with

History
- Founded: pre-10th century – Early medieval Irish religious foundation pre-1192 – Original medieval church 1820 – Current church 1894 – Current church extended
- Dedication: John the Evangelist

Architecture
- Architect(s): unknown, but "aspects of the composition clearly illustrate the continued development or "improvement" of the church to designs by James Franklin Fuller"
- Architectural type: a "medieval" Gothic theme

Administration
- Province: Province of Dublin
- Diocese: United Dioceses of Dublin and Glendalough
- Parish: Blessington Union of Parishes

St. John's Church (officially "The Church of Saint John the Evangelist") is a Church of Ireland church located in Ballymore Eustace, County Kildare, Ireland. The current church, built in 1820, consecrated in 1822 and extended in 1894, stands close to the site of a medieval church first mentioned in 1192. The church, which cost £900 to build, was financially assisted by the Board of First Fruits, and included extensive use of local granite.

Interior features of the church include memorial plaques and stained-glass windows dedicated to families historically connected to the local area, as well as a number of memorials to locals who fell in the First World War. Stained glass windows in the church include those produced by James Powell and Sons (est. 1834) of London, and John Hardman and Company of Birmingham. Dr. David Lawrence indexed the stained glass in the church in 2002 as part of his Gloine project. According to Lawrence, architect James Franklin Fuller designed the chancel in the 1894 extension.

The local nineteenth century diarist Elizabeth Smith described the church thus: "The church is a plain building with an embattled tower surmounted with pinnacles... the churchyard is of great extent, and contains the remains of an old church, and numerous ancient tombstones. In the R.C. division... the chapel at Ballymore is a substantial and commodious building, and there is another at Hollywood...".

== Baptismal font ==
Internally the church contains a large 12th century granite circular baptismal font, possibly moved from the old medieval church which existed nearby.

== Effigy ==
Within the church also lies an early 16th century stone effigy of a chain-mailed knight named Sir Thomas FitzEustace of Castlemartin (died 1454), which was brought there in 1919 for safe-keeping from Old Kilcullen. The knight is depicted as being dressed in a long hauberk shirt of chainmail with a bascinet helmet on his head. His arms and knees are protected by vambraces and couters and there is a sword held in his left hand.

== Monastic settlement ==
The site was originally the location of an earlier early medieval Irish religious foundation, as evidenced by the two 10th-century high crosses situated to the north and south of the present church building. The existence of these high crosses indicates a high likelihood of there having been a former monastic settlement onsite.

=== High crosses ===
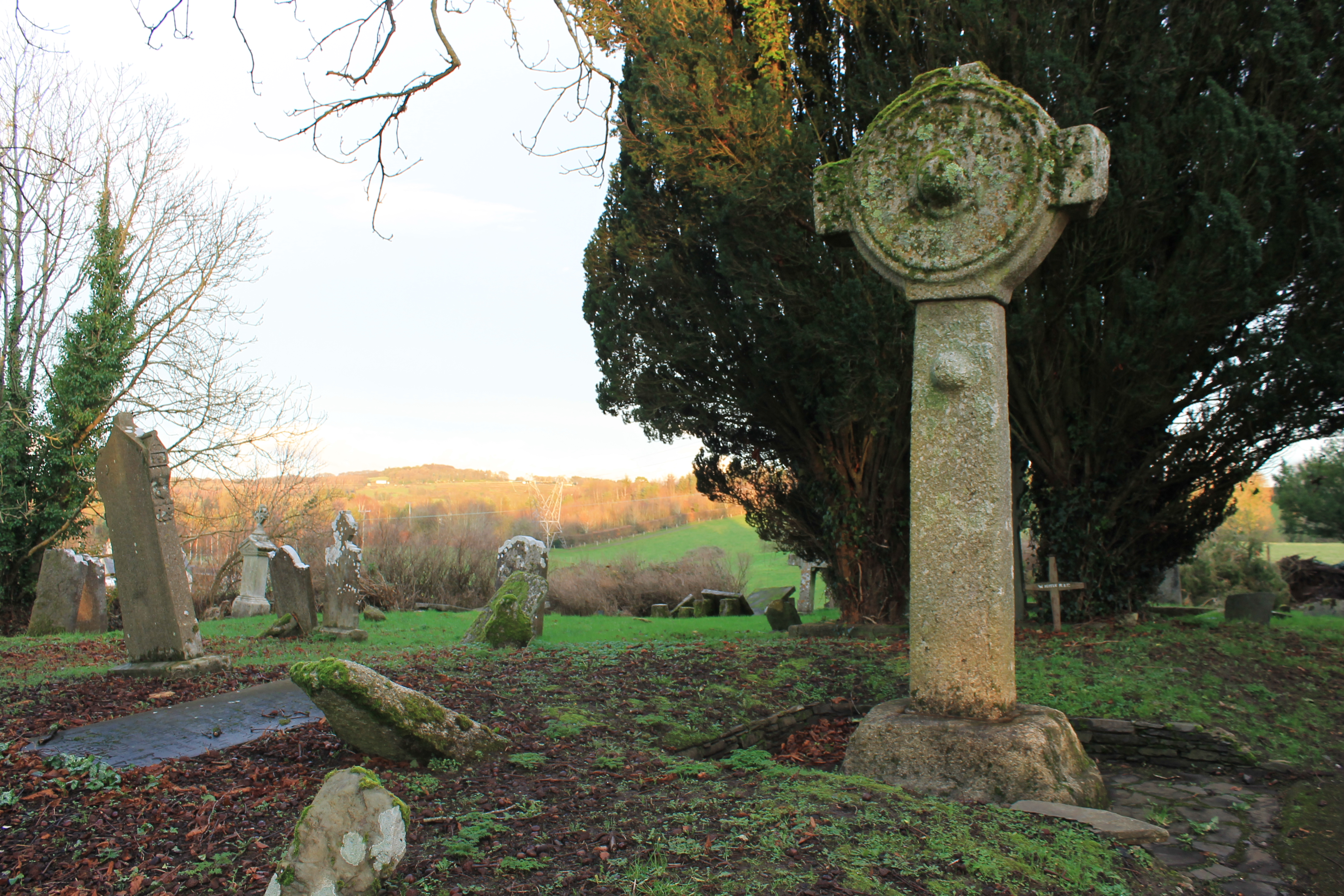
The northern high cross (10th century) at the church

On the north side of the present church stands the better preserved of the two crosses - a granite high cross, over 2 meters in height with a slender shaft supporting a solid ring and short arms, all anchored in a substantial, plain rectangular base. An inscription in the cross commemorates its re-erection in the year 1689 by Ambrose Wall, Sheriff of Wicklow. In 1963, the cross was tilted.

The second high cross exists to the southeast of the modern church but is in bad repair, all that remains being the shaft, but still stands to approximately 6 feet.

== Medieval church ==
Subsequent to the early medieval settlement, a Norman-era parish church was constructed just east of the current St. John's Church, and was first mentioned in 1192. This church was dedicated to the Virgin Mary and subsequent to the reformation to St John. The old church likely became obsolete after Henry VIII's dissolution of the monasteries between 1536 and 1541.

The church was noted as being in good condition during the Royal Visitation of 1615, however it experienced significant deterioration over the subsequent centuries.

As of April 2013, the remains of a tall column (likely a corner section of the east gable wall of the church) remained standing in situ on a mound a short distance from the modern church, along with the foundations of one of the former side walls. This column was noted to have collapsed by March 2015.

=== Grave slabs ===
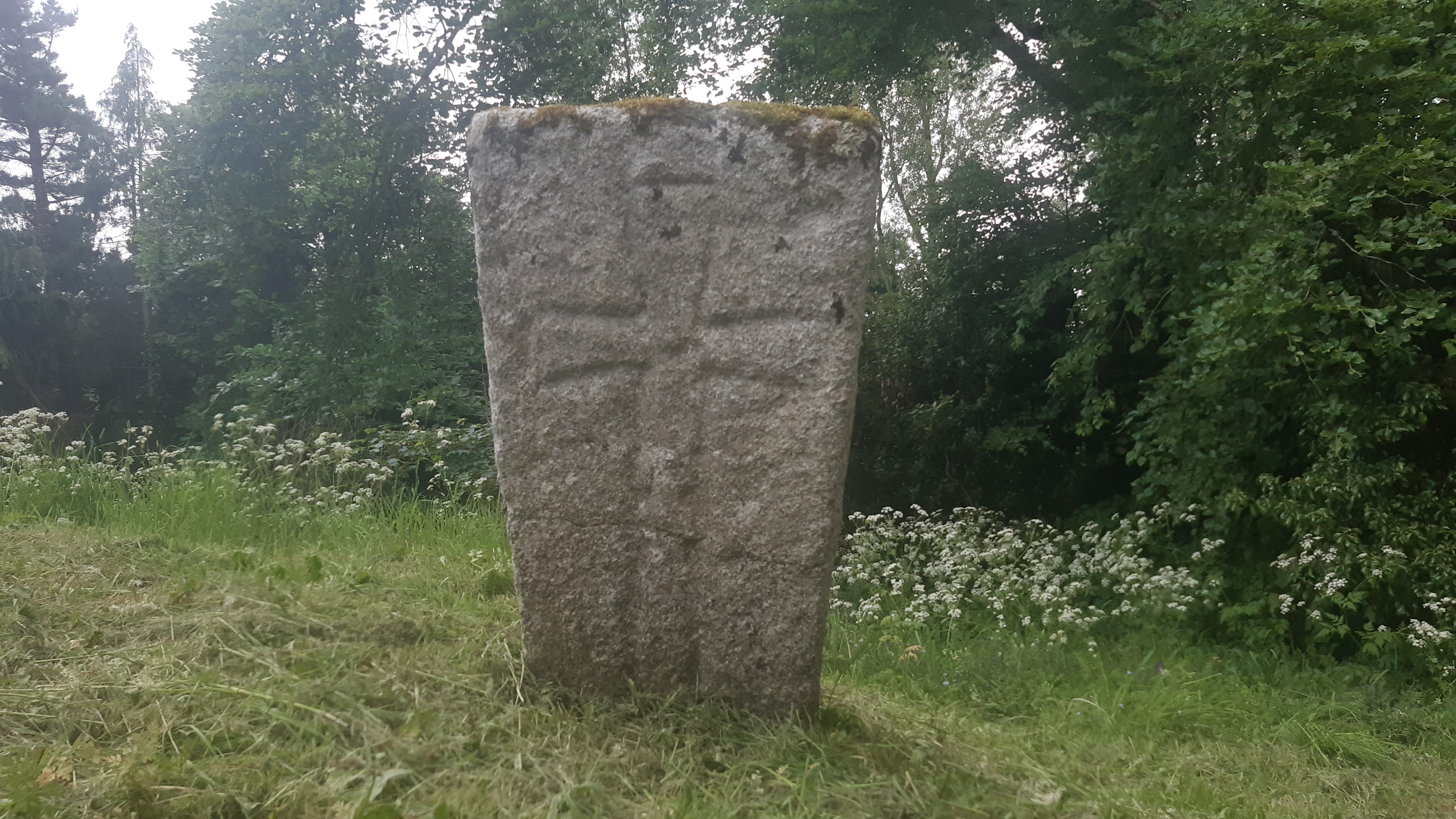
A medieval grave slab

Approximately thirteen distinctive late medieval grave slabs (or graveslabs) from the 12th–13th century lie within the graveyard of the church. Archaeologist Christiaan Corlett contends that the Ballymore Eustace grave slabs belong to one style of slab (distinguishable by their depiction of 'crosses with splayed terminals') out of three identified styles which have been found in the wider West-Wicklow area. Other locations in the area with the same style as the Ballymore Eustace slabs include Aghowle, Ballycook, Donard and Hollywood.

Corlett notes that several of the sites where grave slabs have been found were centres of medieval settlement and served as parish churches during the late medieval period.

== Access ==
The church is located on the top of a small raised hill hugged on one side by the main Ballymore Eustace to N81 road. The church and graveyard are accessed by a stile at the main entrance gate which lies at the end of a short lane off this road. Limited parking is available. An information plaque exists on the exterior of the church detailing the history of the site.

== Gallery ==
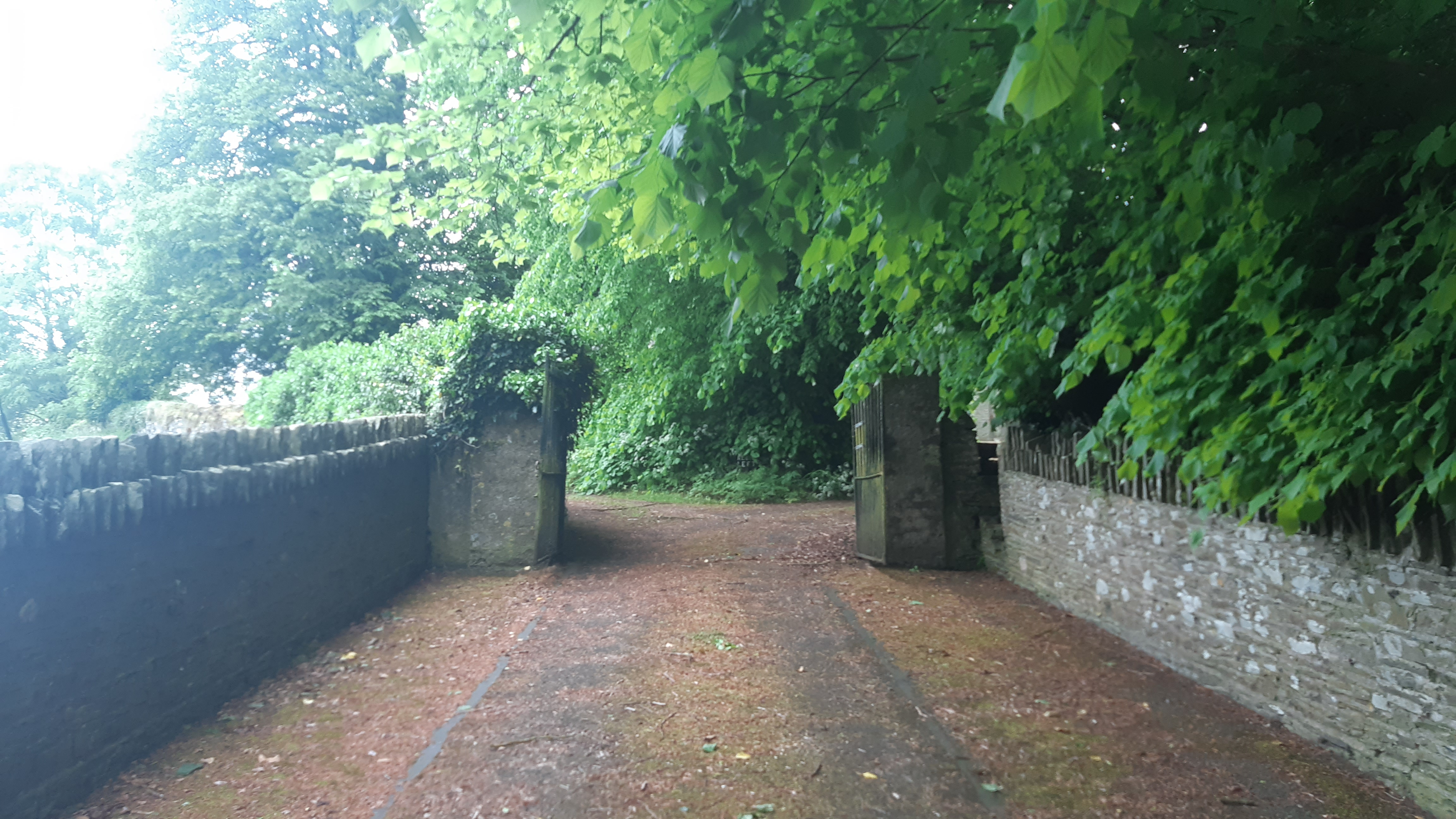
Entrance lane from the road

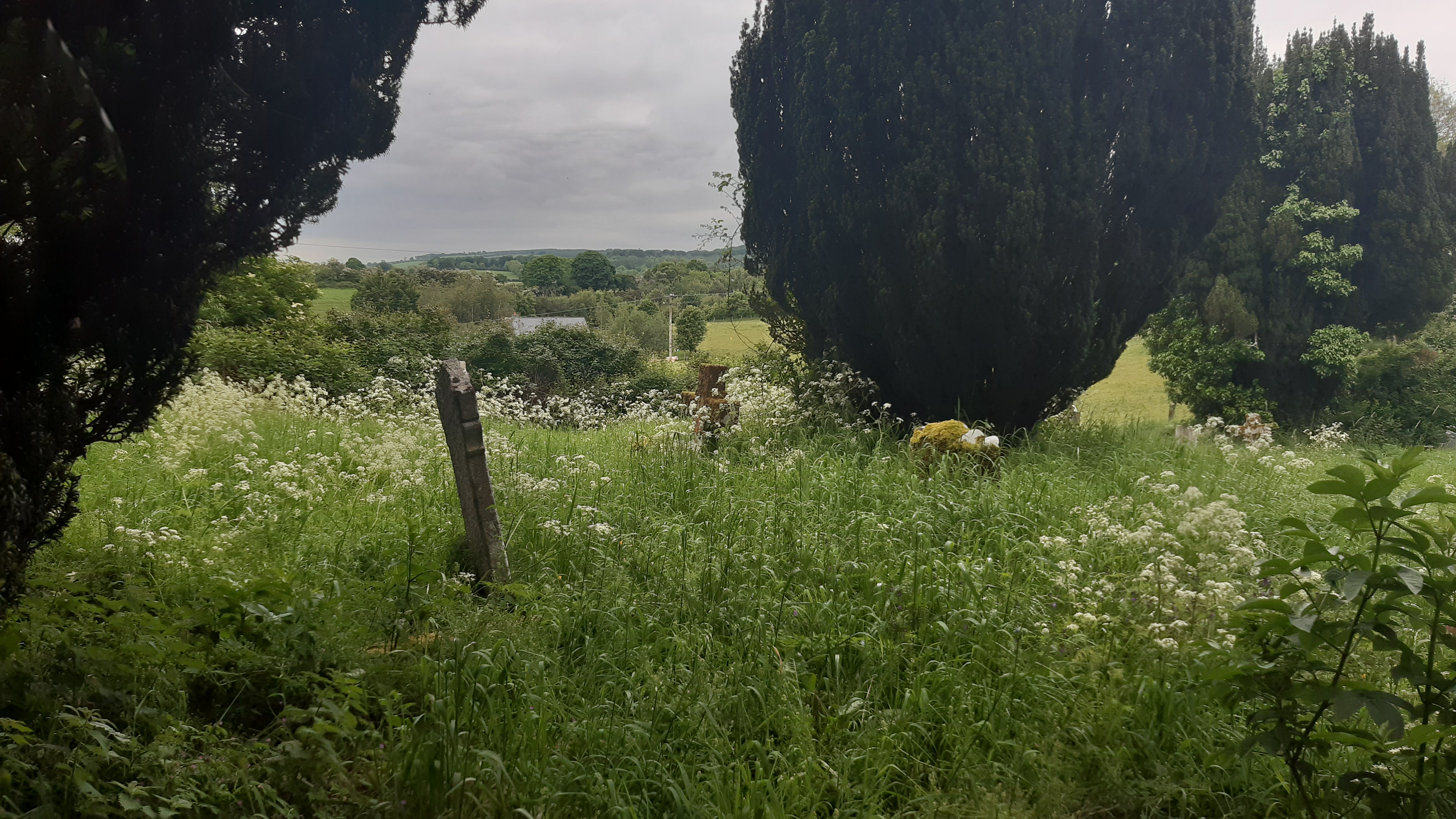
Graves

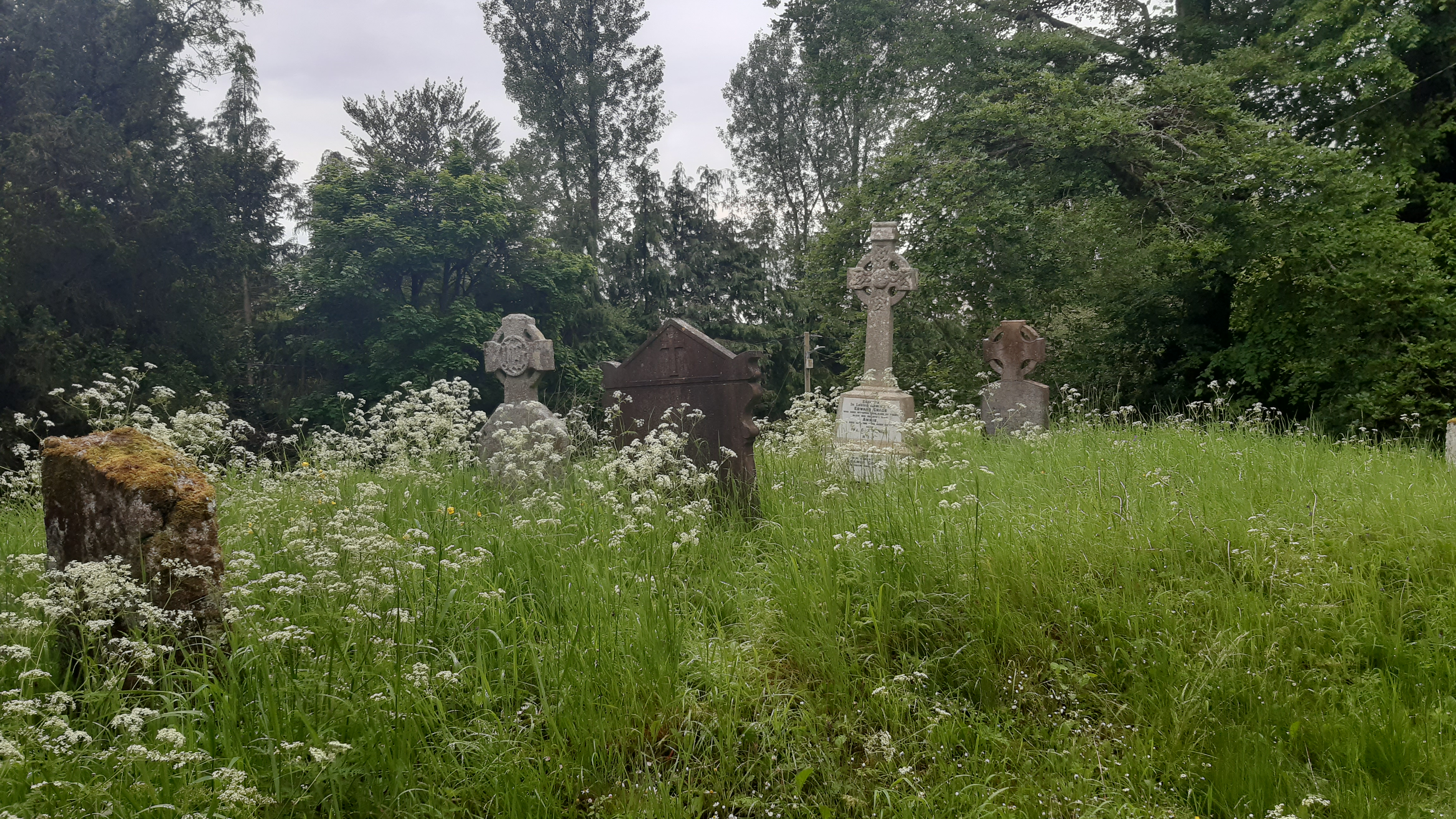
Graves

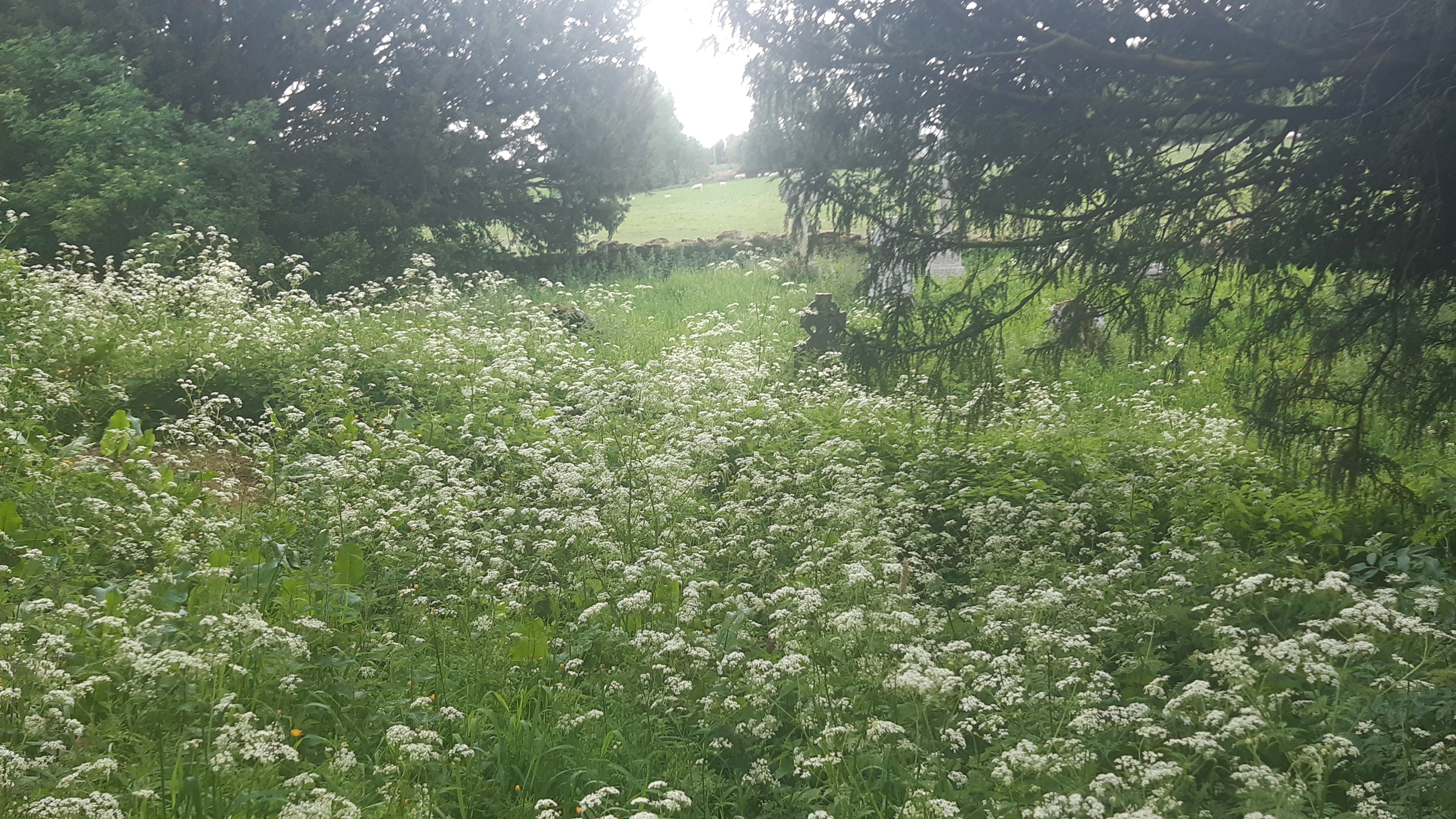
Site to the east of the current St. John's Church, where the medieval church would have existed (covered by weeds and grass in May 2024)

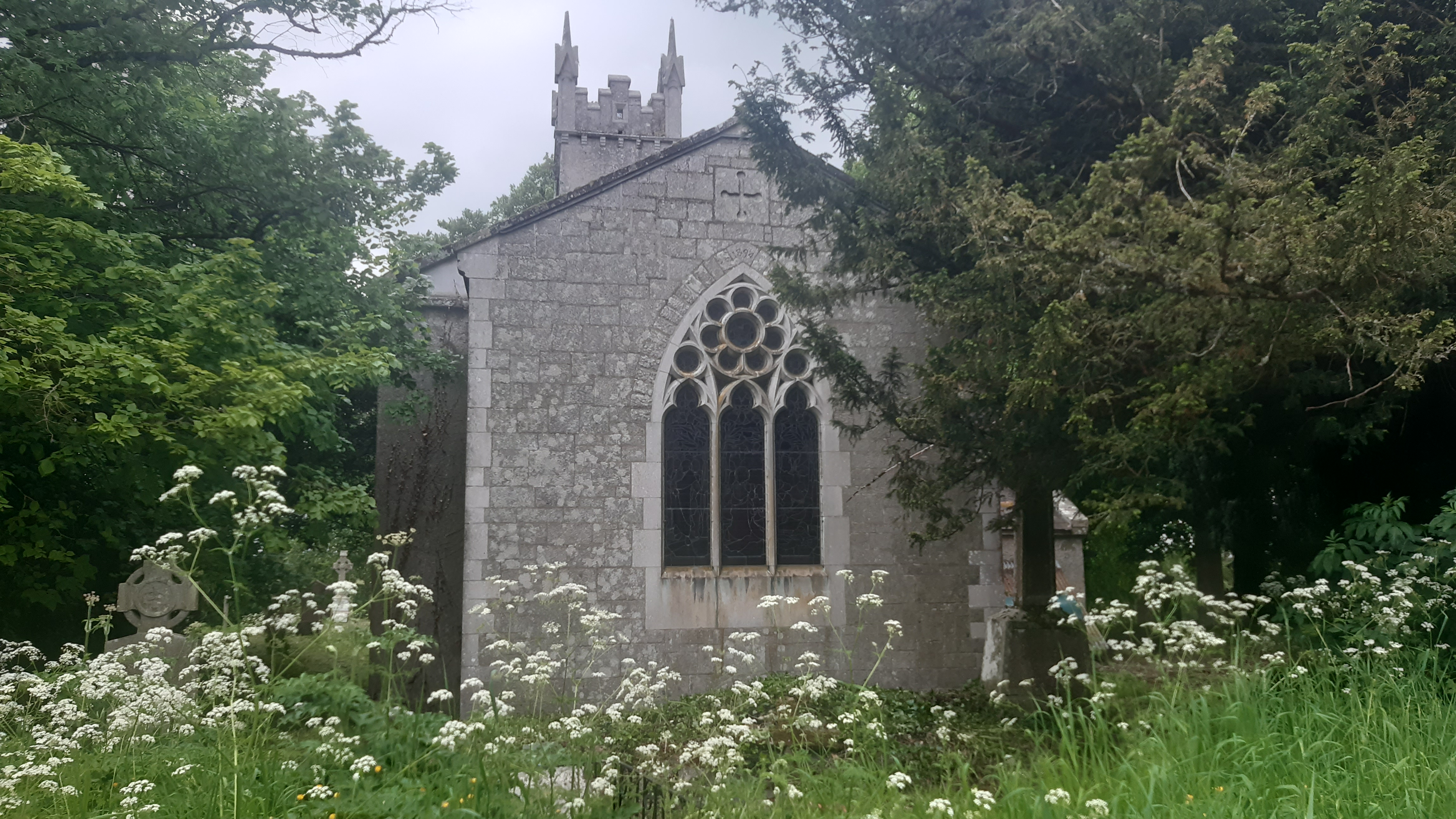
East-facing side of church

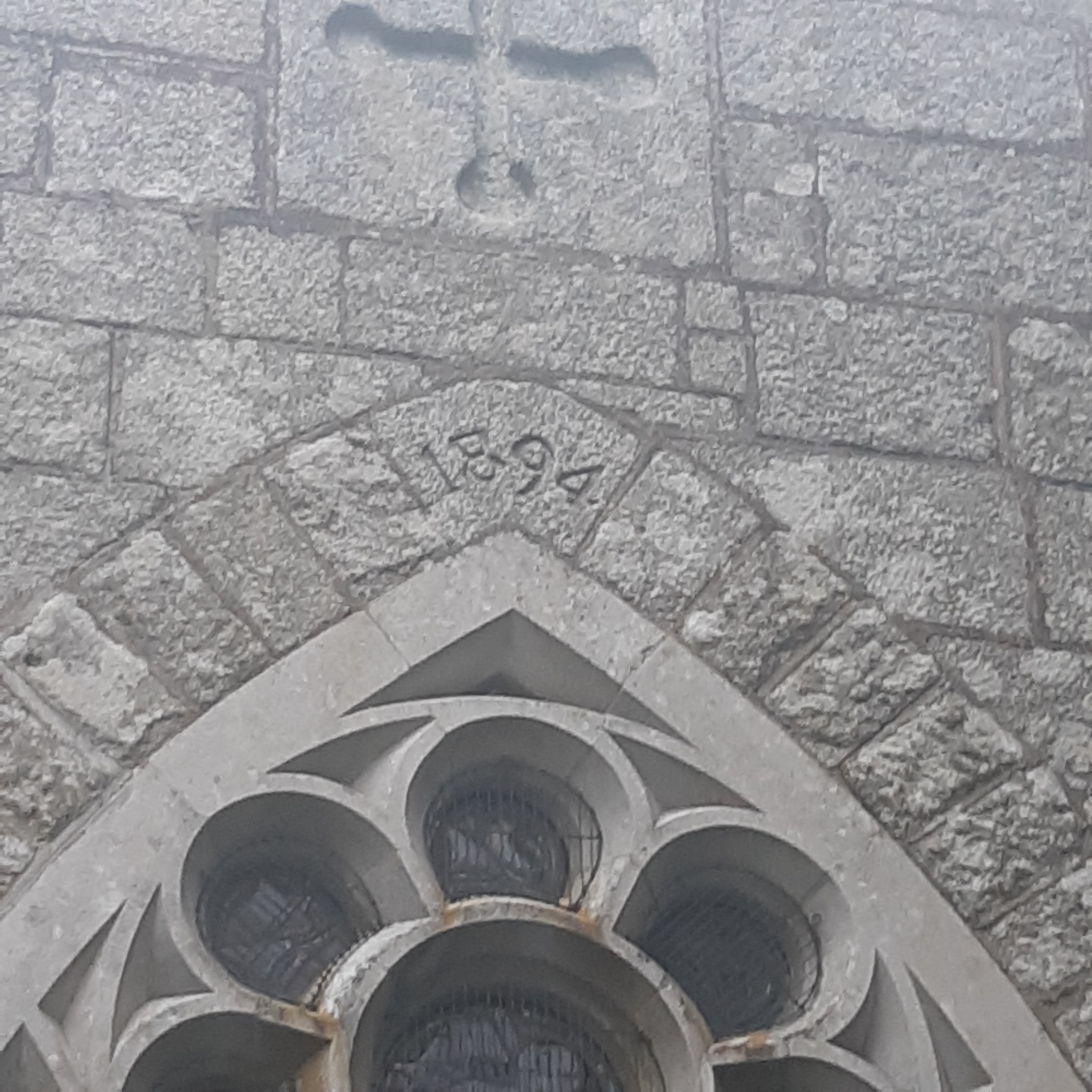
The year 1894 etched into stone

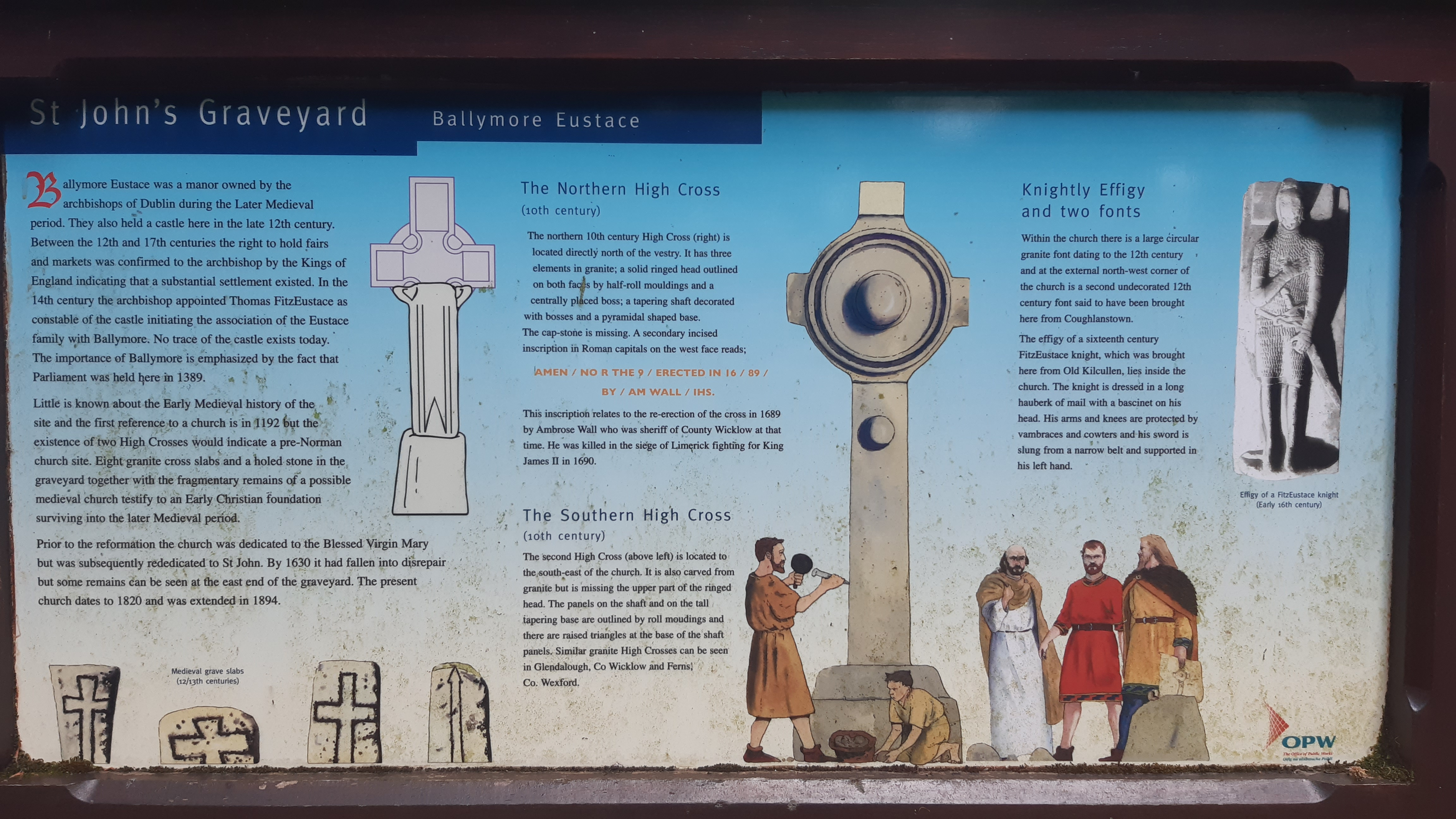
OPW information onsite

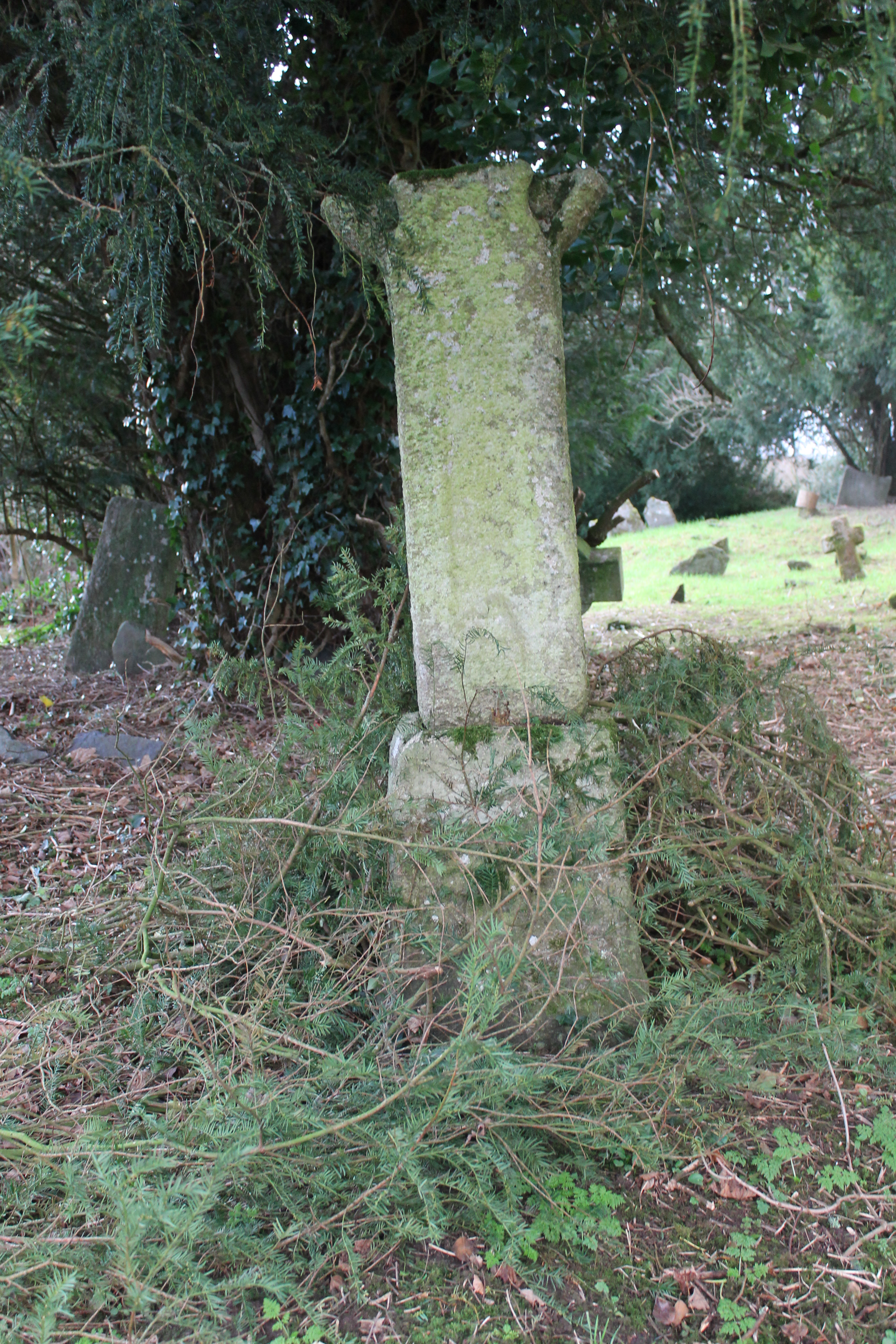
The remains of the southern high cross (10th century) in the cemetery

== Sources ==
- Corlett, Christiaan (1 January 2003). "The Hollywood Slabs: Some Late Medieval Grave Slabs from West Wicklow and Neighbouring Counties". The Journal of the Royal Society of Antiquaries of Ireland. 133. Dublin: Royal Society of Antiquaries of Ireland: 86–110. JSTOR 25509110.
- James, Dermot; Ó Maitiú, Séamas (1996). The Wicklow World of Elizabeth Smith: 1840-1850. Dublin: The Woodfield Press. ISBN 0-9528453-0-X.
