= Rathcoffey Castle =

- Caisleán Ráth Chofaigh (Irish)
- Two-storey gatehouse, viewed from the rear (east)

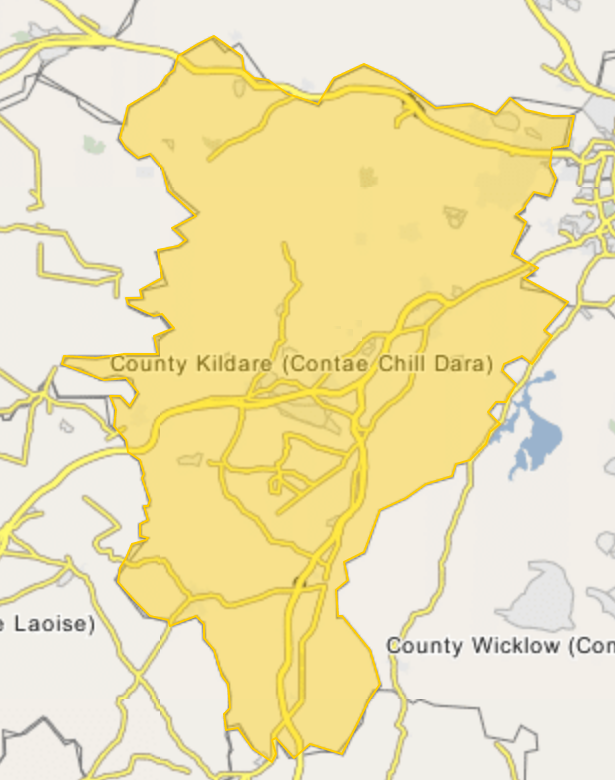
- Location within County Kildare
- 53°19′54″N 6°39′56″W
- Type: Castle
- Location: Rathcoffey Demesne, Rathcoffey, County Kildare, Ireland

History
- Built: 15th century

Site notes
- Architectural style: Norman

National monument of Ireland
- Official name: Rathcoffey Castle
- Reference no.: 404

Rathcoffey Castle is a 15th-century castle in Rathcoffey, County Kildare, Ireland. It is a National Monument.

== Location ==
Rathcoffey Castle is located in a field east of Rathcoffey village. It lies 4.3 km (2.7 mi) north-northwest of Straffan.

== Building ==
A two-storey gatehouse survives; it led to the enclosure which contained the long-demolished castle. The gatehouse has a mullioned window (c. 15th century).

== History ==
John Wogan, Justiciar of Ireland, was granted the Manor of Rathcoffey in 1317 (despite a vigorous effort by the English-born judge Hugh Canoun to have it granted to him instead), and his descendants built a castle there. The Wogans (Ughi, Hugan, Owgan, Wgan, Gwgan, or Wogan) claimed descent from a Roman patrician named Ugus Ughi whose descendants later emigrated to Saxony, and from there England, Wales, and Ireland. Of Cambro-Norman extraction, the name is believed to derive from the Welsh Gwgan. In 1417 Rathcoffey Castle was documented in a Wogan dower. They also owned Picton Castle in Pembrokeshire.

In 1453 an army led by Richard Wogan attacked and captured Rathcoffey Castle from his cousin Anne Eustace (née Wogan). Anne belonged to a more senior line, but Richard was the senior male heir. The result of this conflict left Richard in control of Rathcoffey and Anne and her successors in the Eustace family in possession of the Wogan lands of Clongowes Wood. After the death of her first husband Oliver Eustace, Anne remarried Sir Robert Dowdall. They were equally unsuccessful in regaining their Welsh stronghold, Picton Castle, which was held by Anne's sister Katherine and her husband, Owen Dunn.

In 1580, William Wogan joined the Second Desmond Rebellion in support of the Roman Catholic cause. He was executed the following year and all his lands forfeited. The family regained Rathcoffey soon afterwards.

During the Wars of the Three Kingdoms (1640s) the Wogans sided with Parliament, and Colonel Monck's army marched on Rathcoffey castle, laying siege to it. With the castle's fall in 1642, many civilians were massacred; their bones were found in a forest in the 19th century. The castle's garrison were executed in Dublin.

In the 18th century, the castle belonged to Richard Wogan Talbot. Archibald Hamilton Rowan (later a leading United Irishman) bought it from him in 1785 and built a new mansion on the site of the Castle incorporating the Wogan dwelling in this structure.

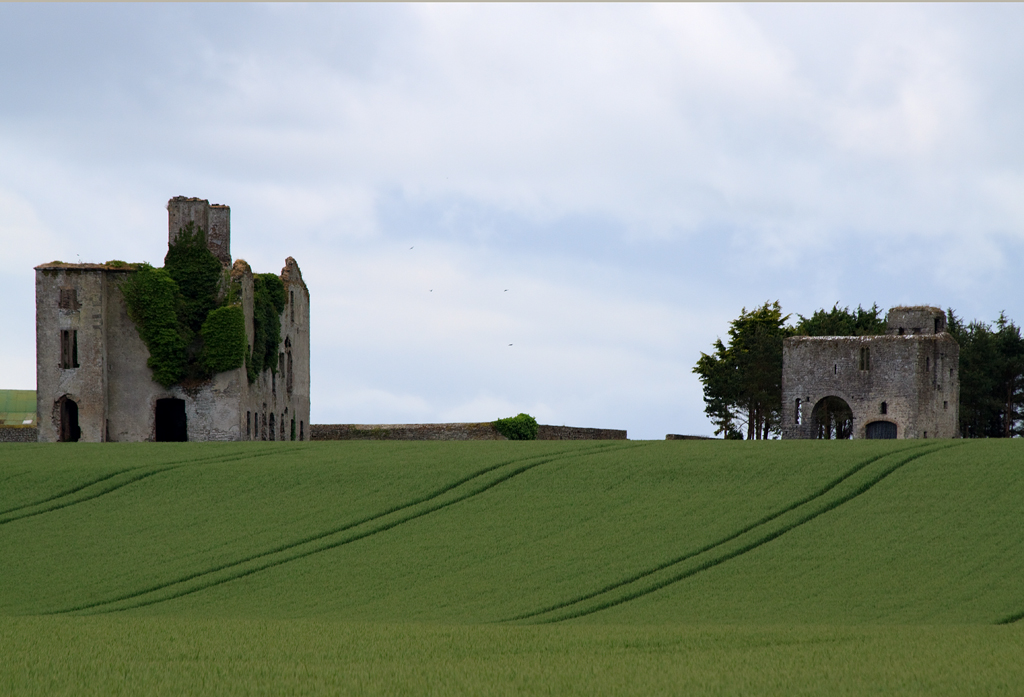
The 18th-century house (left) and ancient castle gatehouse (right).

It later passed between numerous owners before coming into the possession of the Society of Jesus (Jesuits) and then being sold to a local farmer in the 1970s.

== Architectural notes ==
Rathcoffey Castle was a small castle or tower house for a few hundred years until a three-storey classical house was wrapped around the old structure which was retained. Internally the old castle consisted of one room divided in two by a freestanding double-sided fireplace. New windows were cut into the external walls to reflect the current taste in houses with sash windows. Five compartments were wrapped around two sides of the castle. The main staircase off the entrance hall was placed centrally on the new plan. To the left of the hall was an elegantly proportioned room with the servants' staircase off it. Behind the stairs was another service room. The main entrance hall was purely single storey leaving the building above to be somewhat C-shaped. As per castles or tower houses throughout Ireland, the lower floor was vaulted so as to support a solid floor at the first-floor level.
