= James Charles Dowdall =

Irish politician (1873–1939)

Senator
- In office 11 December 1922 – 29 May 1936

Personal details
- Born: 18 February 1873 Chatham, England
- Died: 28 June 1939 (aged 66) Holyhead, Wales
- Party: Fianna Fáil; Independent
- Spouse: Jane Doggett (m. 1929)
- Relatives: Thomas Dowdall (brother)

James Charles Dowdall (18 February 1873 – 28 June 1939) was an Irish politician and businessman.

Born in Chatham, England, Dowdall was a founder member and President of the Cork Industrial Development Association and was a butter and margarine manufacturer. He was also a Director of the Lucania Cycle Company, the Cork Gas Company and Hibernian Insurance Company.

He was appointed to the Free State Seanad Éireann as an independent member in December 1922 by the President of the Executive Council, W. T. Cosgrave. He was one of a number of Senators with commercial backgrounds nominated by Cosgrave.

In the 1928 Seanad election, six Fianna Fáil Senators were elected under the leadership of Joseph Connolly. They were immediately joined by Colonel Maurice George Moore and subsequently Dowdall found himself frequently joining with the party in divisions together with fellow independent Senator Jennie Wyse Power. He soon joined the party after their entry into the Seanad. Both he and Wyse Power stood as Fianna Fáil candidates in the 1934 Seanad election and were re-elected for nine years and served until the abolition of the Seanad.

Dowdall was also a member of the Governing Body of University College Cork. He died on 28 June 1939 and was buried in St. Finbarr's Cemetery.

He was married to Jane Dowdall. His brother was Thomas Dowdall.
