= James Dowdall =

Irish merchant and martyr

James Dowdall (died 20 September 1600) was a Roman Catholic merchant of Drogheda, Ireland. The Dowdalls of Louth originated at Dovedale in Derbyshire and became prominent in Ireland in the late Middle Ages.James Dowdall, the Lord Chief Justice of Ireland, who died in 1584, was a cousin of Dowdall.

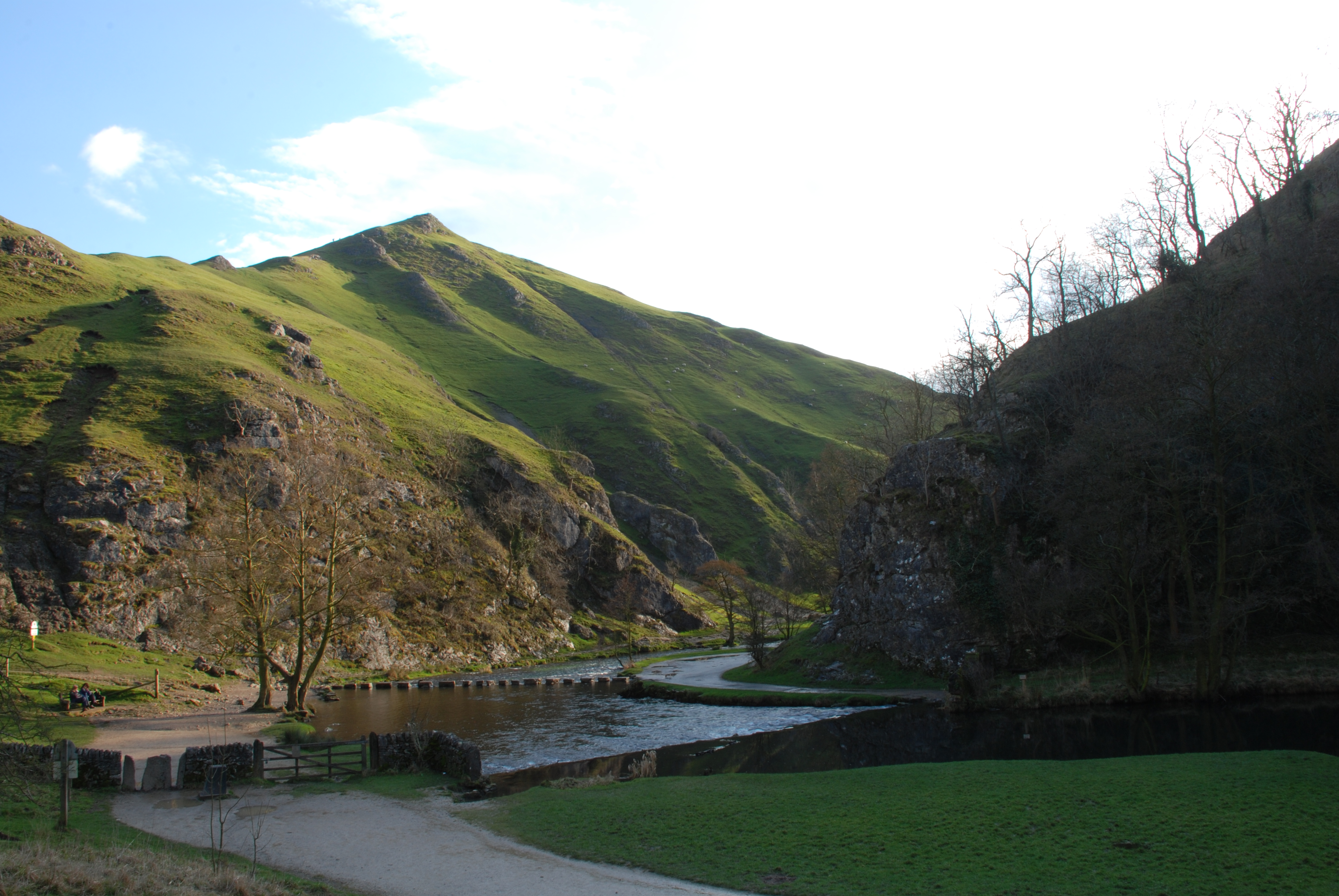
Dovedale, Derbyshire

In the summer of 1598, when returning from France, his ship was driven by stress of weather onto the coast of Devonshire, and he was arrested by William Bourchier, 3rd Earl of Bath, who had him under examination. Dowdall publicly avowed that he rejected the supremacy of Elizabeth I of England, and only recognized that of the Pope.

The earl forwarded the examination to Sir Robert Cecil, and had Dowdall committed to Exeter jail. Whilst in prison he was tortured and put to the rack, but continued unchanged in his Catholicism. On 18 June 1599, the Earl of Bath wrote to Sir Robert Cecil for instructions in regard to James Dowdall, who had been detained in prison for almost a year. Accordingly, he was tried at the Exeter assizes, and was ordered to be hanged, drawn, and quartered.

His name was included in the Apostolic Process of the Irish Martyrs before the Congregation of Sacred Rites.
