= Richard Wogan =

Irish cleric and judge, Lord Chancellor of Ireland

Richard Wogan (died after 1453) was an Irish judge and cleric who held the office of Lord Chancellor of Ireland, and also served as a soldier.

He was born in County Kildare, a member of the Wogan family of Rathcoffey Castle, which produced several distinguished Irish officials. They were originally a Pembrokeshire family. John Wogan, Justiciar of Ireland, died in 1321, having been granted Rathcoffey, Clane and other lands in Kildare in 1317. His descendants built Rathcoffey Castle. The precise relationship between John and Richard is unclear.

Rathcoffey Castle

Richard was a clergyman, but never held high office in the Church: he was described in the Council minutes as "chaplain". He was first mentioned as a Crown official in Ireland in 1441, and held the office of Lord Chancellor, probably between the years 1442 and 1449 (although as usual in this period the exact dates are disputed).

== Lord Chancellor ==
His tenure as Lord Chancellor was marked by controversy, as a result of the bitter feud between the Butler and Talbot factions, which dominated Irish politics for more than two decades. Almost all senior Irish officials of the Crown were forced to declare their allegiance to one or other side, and Wogan chose to support the Talbot faction, headed by John Talbot, 1st Earl of Shrewsbury and his formidable brother Richard, Archbishop of Dublin. As a result, he was accused by Ormonde of treason and of a number of other offences, including hiding the Great Seal of Ireland, failing to enrol Acts of the Privy Council of Ireland and ignoring a summons to appear before the Council. These charges were levelled principally by James Butler, 4th Earl of Ormond, head of the Butler faction.

In 1442 Wogan was accused of "wickedly and without licence quitting Ireland". In fact he had gone to England to plead in his own defence. He argued that the charge of treason meant only that he had attempted to carry out the King's commands, but that none of the King's other officers dared to support him against the Butlers. His defence was accepted, and he twice received a royal pardon for all alleged transgressions committed by him while in Ireland. He evidently wished to continue in office as long as possible, but, not surprisingly, asked that a Deputy might be appointed to act for him as he admitted that "I cannot bear Ormonde's heavy lordship". Although it eventually died away, the feud at its height was so intense that it reached a level of personal hatred.

== Soldier ==
He was unusual among the holders of the office of Lord Chancellor of Ireland in being a military man, who took part in the English defence of Bayonne in 1451. In 1453, he was involved in a private war against his cousin Anne Eustace, the heiress of another branch of the Wogan family, and used his troops to seize back Rathcoffey Castle, which Anne had occupied.

A petition of Anne Eustace and her second husband Sir Robert Dowdall to the Privy Council of Ireland concerning the Wogan inheritance, dated February 1459, suggests that Richard died sometime between 1453 and 1458.
