= Jane Dowdall =

Irish politician, philanthropist, nurse and company director (1899–1974)

Senator
- In office 14 August 1951 – 14 December 1961
- Constituency: Industrial and Commercial Panel

Lord Mayor of Cork
- In office June 1959 – June 1960
- Preceded by: Seán McCarthy
- Succeeded by: Stephen D. Barrett

Personal details
- Born: Jane Doggett; 29 September 1899 Smithfield, Dublin, Ireland
- Died: 10 December 1974 (aged 75) County Cork, Ireland
- Party: Fianna Fáil
- Spouse: James Charles Dowdall (m. 1929; died 1939)
- Occupation: Politician, Nurse, Company director
- Known for: First female Lord Mayor of Cork

Jane Dowdall (née Doggett; 29 September 1899 – 10 December 1974) was an Irish Fianna Fáil politician, philanthropist, nurse and company director.

== Early life and family ==
Born Jane Doggett on 29 September 1899 at 28 Smithfield, Dublin. She was the daughter of eating-house keeper Michael Doggett and Mary Ellen Doggett (née Andrews). Dowdall went to work as a nurse at St. Vincent's Hospital, Dublin after leaving school, and became an active member of the Gaelic League. She married James Charles Dowdall in October 1929, and the couple moved to Cork. They were close friends with Éamon de Valera, who was godfather to their son, Finbarr's twin children.

== Political career ==
After the death of her husband in 1939, she became active in local organisations such as the Irish Country Women's Association, the Penny Dinners and the Society of St Vincent de Paul. In 1945 she was appointed to the management committee of Cork's South Infirmary, going on to become a trustee. She went on to become a member of the Cork health authority and the Cork hospitals' committee, and was one of the founding members of the Women's Industrial Development Association.

She was elected to Seanad Éireann on the Industrial and Commercial Panel at the 1951 election, and was re-elected in 1954 and 1957. While in the Seanad she expressed her support for the ban on married women working in the civil service. She was variously appointed director of the Cancer Association of Ireland, a government nominee on the central council of the Irish Red Cross Society, the first treasurer of the Fresh Air Fund, an executive member of the Irish tourist board, and a director of St. Luke's Hospital, Dublin.

Dowdall was the first female member of Cork City Council and on 24 June 1959 became the first female Lord Mayor of Cork, serving until 1960. During her time in office she ensured a government grant to the Cork Opera House, and was vital to the passing of a private member's bill which gave Cork corporation the power to further fund the Opera House. In 1959, she was a co-founder and patron of the Irish Theatre Ballet Company, served as president of the Cork Orchestral Society and as patron of the Cork Ballet Company. She was a member of the Cork city vocational education committee, lending her support to the School of Music and the School of Art, and a member of the Cork Tóstal Council. She was invited to New York by Mayor Robert Wagner in 1960 as a guest of honour at the St Patrick's Day parade alongside Governor Nelson Rockefeller.

Dowdall was defeated at the 1961 Seanad election, but went on to be one of the first women to sit on the council of state from 1964 to 1974.

== Death and legacy ==
Dowdall lived at Carrigduv, Blackrock, Cork, later retiring to Glanmire, County Cork, and then to Mill House, Kilcully, County Cork. She died in Cork on 10 December 1974.

In 2018, a portrait of her by Soirle MacCana was donated to Cork City Hall to mark 100 years since women's suffrage.

Civic offices
Preceded by Seán McCarthy	Lord Mayor of Cork; 1959–1960	Succeeded by Stephen D. Barrett
