= John Wogan (Justiciar of Ireland) =

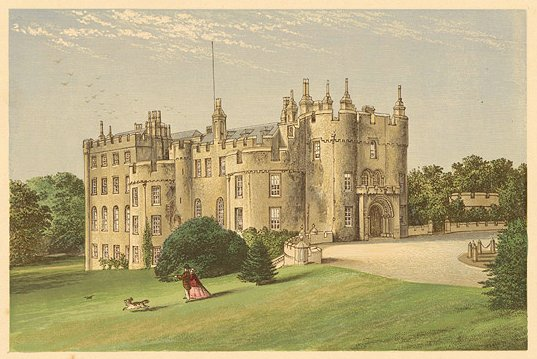
Picton Castle

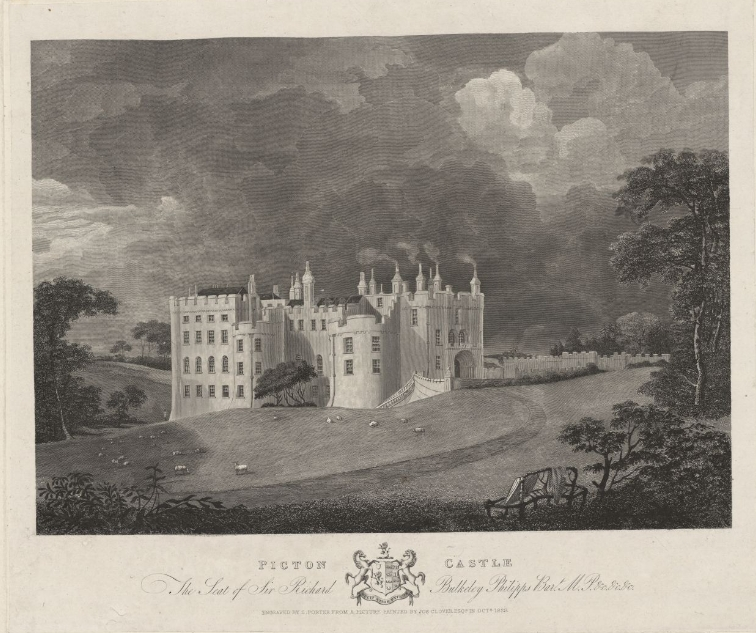
Picton Castle - engraving

Sir John Wogan or John de Wogan, styled lord of Picton (died 1321) was a Cambro-Norman judge who served as Justiciar of Ireland from 1295 to 1313. There are several dubious theories about Wogan's ancestry, and uncertainty exists about his wives, sons, and other relations. He came from Picton in Pembrokeshire and was a vassal of William de Valence, 1st Earl of Pembroke. He came to have lands in Pembrokeshire, Somerset, Dorset, Devon, Wiltshire, and Oxfordshire. He may have represented de Valence at an Irish court case in 1275, and in 1280 he was steward of Wexford, Valence's Irish liberty. He was a justice in eyre in England in 1281–4, and returned to Ireland in 1285. In 1290 he was a referee with Hugh Cressingham in a dispute between Queen Eleanor and de Valence and his wife. He was on eyre again in the mid-1290s, sitting in the North of England.

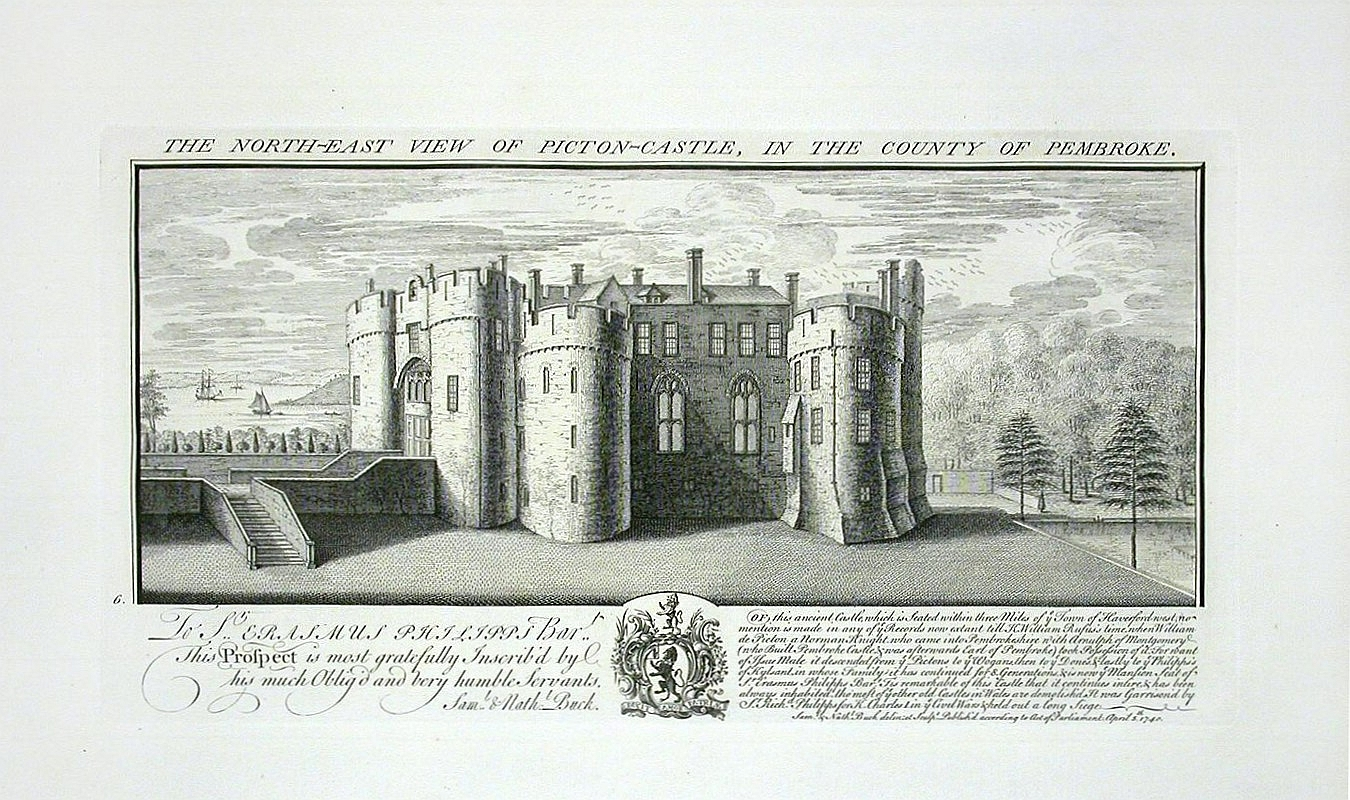
The North East View of Picton Castle by Samuel and Nathaniel Buck

In December 1295 he took office as justiciar, and organised a two-year truce between the feuding Burkes and Fitzgeralds (Geraldines). In 1296 he organised a force with Richard Óg de Burgh, 2nd Earl of Ulster, Theobald Butler, and John FitzGerald, 1st Earl of Kildare, to assist Edward I in his war against the Scots; the king entertained them at Roxburgh Castle in May. After his return to Ireland, Wogan "kept everything so quiet that we hear of no trouble in a great while". The Parliament of Ireland he summoned in 1297 was for long compared to the English "Model Parliament" of 1295, though historical opinion now places less importance on it. He was also a diligent judge, who held the assizes regularly.

In February 1308, under orders from the new king Edward II, Wogan suppressed the Knights Templars in Ireland. The order was made on the Wednesday after the feast of the Epiphany. He arrested them, made an inventory of their possessions, and imprisoned them at the Castle of Dublin, to which they had to answer to the Archbishop and his vicar. In June 1308 Wogan's forces were defeated by the O'Tooles and O'Byrnes, who were harrying The Pale from the Wicklow Mountains. From September 1308 to May 1309 Piers Gaveston was in Ireland as "king's lieutenant", a new position outranking the justiciar, and he had more success against the Gaels. Wogan left Ireland in August 1312 although remaining nominally justiciar until April 1313.

Either the same John Wogan or his son of the same name returned to Ireland in 1316 as advisor to Roger Mortimer, 1st Earl of March, who countered Edward Bruce's invasion of Ireland. He received a grant of Rathcoffey, Clane and Mainham in County Kildare: his descendants lived at Rathcoffey Castle for generations. Wogan died in 1321 and was buried in St. David's Cathedral, initially in a chapel he had endowed, later in Edward Vaughan's chapel.

He married Joan, daughter of Sir William Picton of Picton Castle: he may also have made a second marriage to Margaret de Valle, daughter of Robert de Valle. There is considerable confusion about the number and names of his children, and whether they were all by Joan. There appear to have been at least five sons, William, Thomas, John ( a judge of the Irish Justiciar's Court), Bartholomew and Walter, (Escheator of Ireland), and two daughters, Joan and Eleanor.

Benjamin Heath Malkin, the English historian, made a reference to the Wogan family in his lengthy 1804 history of South Wales which might either clarify or confuse its history. He described Llangoed Castle (now known as Llangoed Hall) in the historic county of Brecknockshire in the then-current orthography as:

'within, and part of a great manor or lordfhip, the entire of which belonged to originally belonged to the ancient family of Wogan, who were Knights Templars. This family quitted Brecknockfhire and became lords of Pifton Castle in Pembrokeshire.'
