= Rathcoffey =

Village in County Kildare, Ireland

Rathcoffey Ráth Chofaigh
- Village
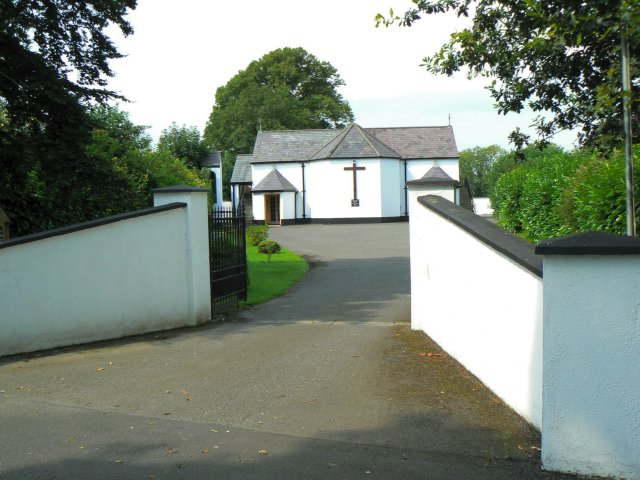
- Rathcoffey church

- Location in Ireland
- Coordinates: 53°20′N 6°41′W
- Country: Ireland
- Province: Leinster
- County: County Kildare

Population (2016)
  - Total: 271
- Time zone: UTC+0 (WET)
  - Summer (DST): UTC+1 (IST (WEST))

Rathcoffey (Irish: Ráth Chofaigh, meaning 'Cofaigh's ringfort') is a village in County Kildare, Ireland, around 30 km west of Dublin city centre. It had a population of 271 as of 2016 census. The village church, Rathcoffey Church, is part of the Clane & Rathcoffey Parish, and was built in 1710. Rathcoffey National School, a co-educational Catholic primary school, is the only educational institution in the village. Rathcoffey GAA is a Gaelic Athletic Association (GAA) club based in Rathcoffey. The club was founded in February 1888. Teams representing the club play hurling, camogie and Gaelic football.

The Wogan family of Rathcoffey Castle were the principal landowners in Rathcoffey in the Middle Ages. In 1453, a private war erupted between different branches of the Wogan family for possession of Rathcoffey Castle.

== Notable residents ==
- John Wogan, Justiciar of Ireland, was granted Rathcoffey about 1317, the first of the Wogans to live there.
- Richard Wogan of Rathcoffey, Lord Chancellor of Ireland (died after 1453) was John's descendant.

== See also ==
- List of towns in the Republic of Ireland
