= Clement Fitzleones =

Irish lawyer and judge

Clement Fitzleones, FitzLyons, or Leones (died c. 1509) was an Irish lawyer and judge. He held the offices of Serjeant-at-law (Ireland) and Attorney-General for Ireland and was briefly Deputy to the Chief Baron of the Irish Exchequer.

Neither Ball nor Hart gave any details of his family background, but there was a prominent merchant family of that name has been recorded in Dublin since the thirteenth century, and a landowning family of the same name in County Meath, which died out sometime after 1290. In 1281 Geoffrey Fitzleones and his wife Johanna granted the rents from their lands at Ballyardolf to the Augustinian Friary of Holy Trinity. Probably the most notable member of this family was Patrick FitzLeones, who was Lord Mayor of Dublin in 1477-1478, 1482-1483 and 1494-1495. Patrick was clearly a man of considerable wealth and social standing, who married into the powerful Eustace family, and subsequently married his daughter Margaret to John Barnewall, 3rd Baron Trimlestown, Lord Chancellor of Ireland. If Clement was one of the Dublin family, he was probably the same Clement Fitzleones who was elected one of the Constables of Dublin in 1493.

In 1493 Clement was Deputy to John Wyse, the Lord Chief Baron of the Exchequer. According to Elrington Ball, the practice of appointing Deputies to this office had begun ten years earlier with the appointment of Oliver FitzEustace, a natural son of Rowland FitzEustace, 1st Baron Portlester as Chief Baron. Oliver, who owed his appointment solely to his father's great influence, was not only lacking in legal training, but was apparently mentally deficient and incapable of speech. In 1494 Wyse was replaced by Walter Ivers, former Chancellor of the Exchequer of Ireland, as part of a general purge of Irish judges whose loyalty to the new Tudor dynasty was considered suspect, and Fitzleones was presumably removed at the same time.

In 1499 Fitzleones, having regained the Crown's trust, was made Attorney General, or "King's Attorney in all Courts" as the patent describes him, where he is called Clement Leones. The reference to "all Courts" is unusual: previous Attorneys were usually licensed to appear in specific courts. By 1505 he had been promoted to the more senior office of King's Serjeant. In 1509 Patrick Finglas was appointed Serjeant. While two serjeants occasionally acted at the same time, as a rule, there was only one, which suggests that Fitzleoenes had recently died.
