= Hugh de Burgh =

Irish lawyer, crown official and judge (d.1352)

Lord Treasurer of Ireland
- In office 1349–1352
- Monarch: Edward III of England
- Preceded by: Robert de Emeldon
- Succeeded by: William de Bromley
- In office 1340–1344
- Preceded by: John ap Rees/Rice
- Succeeded by: John de Burnham

Chief Baron of the Irish Exchequer
- In office 1344–1351
- Preceded by: Robert le Poer
- Succeeded by: Robert de Emeldon
- In office 1337–1339
- Preceded by: Thomas atte Crosse
- Succeeded by: Robert le Poer

Keeper of the Great Seal of Ireland
- In office 23 February 1341 – 23 May 1341
- Preceded by: Roger Utlagh, or Outlaw
- Succeeded by: Robert Askeby

Personal details
- Born: Hugh de Burgh England
- Died: 1352 Ireland
- Relatives: William Donn de Burgh, 3rd Earl of Ulster (cousin)

Hugh de Burgh (English: /dəˈbɜːr/ də-BUR; died 1352) was an Irish lawyer, Crown official and judge who held the offices of Lord Treasurer of Ireland (1340–44 and 1349–52) and Chief Baron of the Irish Exchequer (1337–39 and 1344–51), and was praised for his good service to the English Crown and pardoned of accusations of maladministration.

== Background ==
Although he is said to have been born in England, he was a member of the leading Anglo-Irish de Burgh dynasty and was a cousin of William Donn de Burgh, 3rd Earl of Ulster. He later acted as attorney for the Earl's daughter and heiress Elizabeth, Duchess of Clarence. Her mother, Maud of Lancaster, who was a second cousin to King Edward III, used her considerable influence at Court on Hugh's behalf.

Despite the later complaints about his misconduct, he was a professional lawyer and, as such, better qualified for appointment to the Bench than some of his colleagues: the Barons of the Court of Exchequer (Ireland) in that era were often accused of being deficient in their knowledge of the law. As was then usual when seeking an appointment to the Bench, he took holy orders.

== Service ==
De Burgh was already in the service of the Crown in 1331, when he came to Ireland. He later became the Irish attorney to Queen Philippa of Hainault. In 1335, he became third Baron of the Court of Exchequer (Ireland), holding office at the King's pleasure. In 1337 he was continued in office for four years, in consideration of his past good service to the Crown, and shortly afterwards he became Chief Baron. He was appointed Keeper of the Great Seal of Ireland, and was its custodian on 23 February 1341 until he relinquished the office on 23 May that year, and became Lord Treasurer of Ireland in 1340. He was reappointed Chief Baron in 1344.

In 1347, he was accused of misconduct, and a commission of oyer and terminer, headed by Thomas de Dent, the Chief Justice of the Irish Common Pleas, was set up to inquire into his "oppression". Precisely what form the alleged oppression (a term which has no precise modern equivalent) took is unclear. Similar charges against his successor, John de Burnham, were concerned with fraud and financial mismanagement, and it seems that the Privy Council of Ireland had some doubts about de Burgh's honesty. The complaints against him formed part of a wider pattern of general dissatisfaction with the King's Irish royal servants and, as a result, the commission's remit was soon extended into an examination of official wrongdoing more generally.

John de Burnham, an English Crown official with long experience in financial administration, was sent to Ireland as Treasurer to reform de Burgh's alleged abuses, only to spend much of his career fighting charges of corruption. In 1348, de Burgh went to England to plead his case; presumably, he made a convincing defence of his actions, since he received a royal pardon for any transgressions he had committed. He returned to Ireland, and remained Chief Baron until 1351; he died a year later.

Political offices
Preceded by Robert de Emeldon	Lord Treasurer of Ireland; 1349–1352	Succeeded by William de Bromley
Preceded by Robert le Poer	Chief Baron of the Irish Exchequer; 1344–1351	Succeeded by Robert de Emeldon
Preceded by John ap Rees/Rice	Lord Treasurer of Ireland; 1340–1344	Succeeded by John de Burnham
Preceded by Roger Utlagh or Outlaw	Keeper of the Great Seal of Ireland; 1341–1341	Succeeded by Robert Askeby
Preceded by Thomas atte Crosse	Chief Baron of the Irish Exchequer; 1337–1339	Succeeded by Robert le Poer
