= John de Pembroke =

John de Pembroke (died after 1377) was a Welsh-born judge who held several senior offices in Ireland, including that of Chancellor of the Exchequer of Ireland.

He was born in Pembrokeshire. Nothing is known of his family. He was in the service of the English Crown by 1348. He was then appointed third Baron of the Court of Exchequer (Ireland). He became Chancellor of the Exchequer in 1350 and subsequently Escheator of Ireland. In 1361 he was charged with the onerous task of supervising and enrolling all debts, receipts, accounts, allowances and assignments in the Exchequer in Dublin.

He was still living in 1377, when he petitioned the Crown for repayment of the expenses incurred in his recent journey to County Meath with Alexander de Balscot, the Lord Treasurer of Ireland, to levy the King's debts and transact all of the King's other business, for which he had received no reward. On foot of his petition he was awarded £4.

A second John of Pembroke, who was also a Baron of the Irish Exchequer in the 1380s, was probably a relative of the first John.
