= Richard le Brun =

English-born cleric, judge and Crown official in Ireland

Richard le Brun (died after 1324) was an English-born cleric, judge and Crown official in fourteenth-century Ireland. He was Chief Baron of the Irish Exchequer 1319–1324.

He is first heard of in 1310, when he was acting as attorney in England to Nicholas de Balscote, a senior figure in the Exchequer of Ireland who became Chancellor of the Exchequer of Ireland the same year, and Chief Baron of the Irish Exchequer three years later. Richard later moved to Ireland and obtained a position at the Exchequer, where he was described as a "King's clerk". His precise job was "engrosser", which generally meant a copier of deeds, but in view of his later eminence, it was presumably a senior enough position. He also served as an itinerant justice in County Wexford. In 1320 Nicholas Babau acknowledged that Richard and William de Bardelby, afterwards Master of the Rolls in Ireland, had the right to a crop of wheat in Balgoray (possibly Ballygorey, County Kilkenny).

He was in holy orders and became a prebendary both in the Diocese of Cloyne and the Diocese of Ossory. He became a Baron of the Exchequer in 1319, and almost immediately replaced Balscote, who was in disgrace following a quarrel with King Edward II of England, as Chief Baron. Richard held that office until 1324, when he was replaced by Adam de Harvington. His date of death is not recorded.

There was a later judge of the same name, who may have been a relative of the first Richard. The second Richard served as a justice of the Court of Common Pleas (Ireland) in the 1330s.

== Sources ==
- Ball, F. Elrington The Judges in Ireland 1221-1921 London John Murray 1926
- Patent Rolls 17 Edward II
