= William de Chambre =

William de Chambre may refer to:

- William de Chambre (Irish priest), 14th-century Archdeacon of Dublin, Lord High Treasurer of Ireland, and Dean of St Patrick's Cathedral, Dublin
- William de Chambre (chronicler), attributed author of the continuation of Robert de Graystanes' History of Durham
