= Christopher Dowdall =

Christopher Dowdall was a 15th-century Archdeacon of Meath, serving from 1489 to 1498.
