= Robert Crull =

Treasurer of Ireland

Sir Robert Crull (1349–1408) was the Treasurer of Ireland during the reigns of Richard II and Henry IV. Crull is an important figure in the history of English Ireland during the reign of Richard II (1382–1399) for two reasons: his involvement in the antagonism between the Geraldine and Butler families at its most notorious stage, and being at times a sacrificial lamb in Richard II's power struggle with the English Parliament over the stormy colonial politics that ensued.

Crull had been prebendary of Swords, and had been asked by the English colonial community to go to Westminster in 1385 to transact business relating to the problems caused by the falling-out between the then English Lord Lieutenant of Ireland, Sir Philip Courtenay, and his appointed Chief Governor of Ireland James Butler, 3rd Earl of Ormond. Crull had been a protégé of Ormond and Bishop Alexander de Balscot. All three joined Robert de Vere, the Earl of Oxford and newly appointed Marquess of Dublin and Duke of Ireland, and his lieutenant Sir John Stanley in the expedition to Ireland to quell the insurrection. The three supplied small companies to the general muster of Stanley's army with Crull providing, among other things, 24 archers of his retinue. The success of this expedition led to rewards for Earl James (Butler) III of Ormond, Bishop Alexander (who became Chancellor of Ireland) and Robert Crull (appointed Treasurer of Ireland in 1386).

The Battle of Radcot Bridge in December 1387, between forces loyal to Richard II led by de Vere, and an army captained by Henry Bolingbroke, Earl of Derby, resulted in defeat for de Vere and his subsequent disgrace. This and the plans of William Courtenay, Archbishop of Canterbury, for protecting his nephew Sir Philip Courtenay, and the convening of the "Merciless Parliament" to curb the power of the king led to the dismissal of Stanley, Bishop Alexander, and Crull, and embarrassment for the Earl of Ormond. However Richard II, in trying to win over the House of Commons at the Cambridge parliament of September 1388, promised, among other things, to assume greater governance of his Irish realm, and this led him to reappointed Stanley, Bishop Alexander and Crull to reconstitute the administration of the Duke of Ireland. The Earl of Ormand's status also again rose.

The foregoing served as a pattern for all four during the subsequent years of Richard II's reign. Crull served briefly to 1403 during the early days of Henry IV, who depicted Richard II as a tyrant to enhance the legitimacy of his own seizure of the throne.
