= William de Epworth =

English-born judge and Crown official in Ireland

William de Epworth (died after 1348) was an English-born judge and Crown official in Ireland in the reign of King Edward III. His career was marked by conflict with two other judges, Nicholas de Snyterby and John de Troye, who contested his right to sit as a Baron of the Court of Exchequer (Ireland). He also faced allegations of corruption in his conduct in another non-judicial office, which was taken very seriously, but of which he was ultimately cleared.

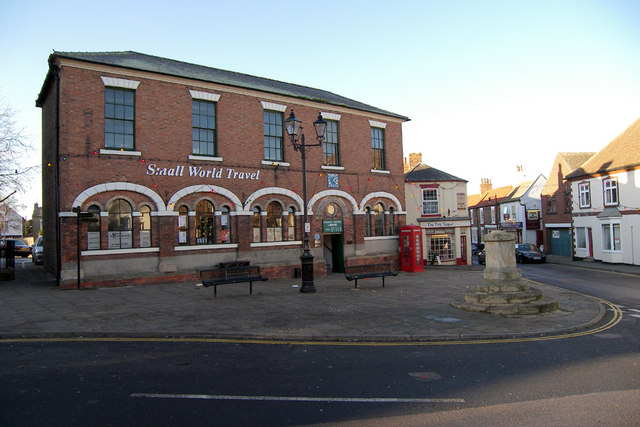
Epworth Market Place, present day

He was born in Epworth, Lincolnshire. He appears to have taken Holy Orders. His title "Master William Epworth" shows that he had a University degree. He entered the royal service, and was presumably a senior Crown servant by 1338, when he is first heard of in Ireland as Treasurer of Ulster. He was generally called "clerk". In 1341 he was appointed steward of the royal lands in Ireland. In 1343 he was granted the watermill on Dame Street near Dublin Castle on a lease for nine years, on condition that he repair it if necessary.

In 1340 he was appointed second Baron of the Exchequer, but faced a challenge to his position from the Irish-born judge Nicholas de Snyterby. The matter was resolved in 1342 in Epworth's favour and Snyterby stood down; he did not suffer undue hardship, since, by modern standards, he also had a seat on the Court of Common Pleas (Ireland).

Epworth however now faced serious allegations of fraud and misappropriation in his dealings in his other office as steward of the royal lands. King Edward III, who had appointed him "so long as he was of good behaviour", dismissed him from the Bench, and he was imprisoned in Dublin Castle. The Justiciar of Ireland was ordered to send him to England to face his accusers. However Epworth vigorously maintained his innocence, and after a lengthy inquiry ultimately prevailed against "all sinister suspicions of him".

Epworth was removed from his office of royal steward, but he was appointed Seneschal for County Dublin. As was the custom for former Barons at the time he petitioned the Privy Council of Ireland for reimbursement of his expenses incurred in travelling through the provinces, without any reward, to levy the King's debts (this was one of the principal tasks of a Baron at the time and for three centuries longer).

In 1346 he brought a High Court action for trespass against Adam Pornonele and other unnamed defendants. The defendants were outlawed for non-appearance, a common sanction at the time, but received a royal pardon for their transgressions.

Having cleared his name, he was reappointed to the Bench in 1348, but faced another challenge to his office from the Welsh-born judge John de Troye, who briefly replaced him. On this occasion Epworth was successful and de Troye stepped down, although he was allowed to retain the title Baron, and went on to hold other high offices, including Lord High Treasurer of Ireland. Epworth's date of death is not recorded.

== Sources ==
- Ball, F. Elrington The Judges in Ireland 1221-1921 London John Murray 1926
- Patent Rolls Edward III
- Rowberry, Ryan "The origins and development of judicial tenure "during good behaviour" to 1485" in Law and Society in Later Medieval England and Ireland Georgia State University 2017
