= James Moorcraft =

James Moorcraft (14 January 1669 - 9 April 1723) was an Anglican priest in Ireland during the late 17th and early 18th centuries.

Moorcraft was born in Lancashire and educated at Trinity College, Dublin. He was Archdeacon of Meath from 1698 until his death.
