= William de Bardelby =

English-born Irish judge

William de Bardelby (died 1337) was an English-born judge in Ireland.

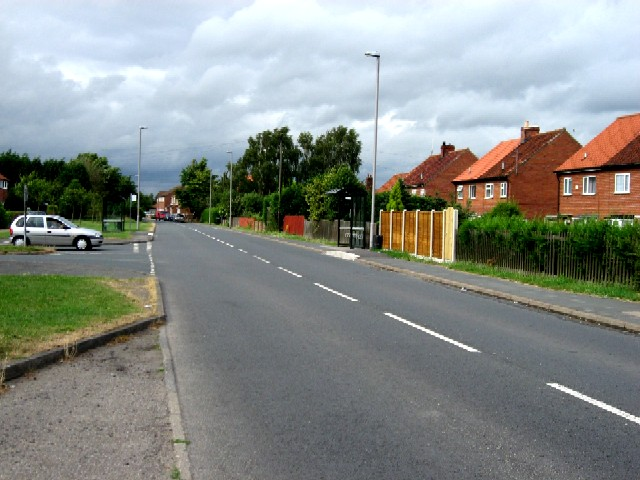
Barlby, present day

He took his name from his birthplace, Barlby, North Yorkshire. He was probably a cousin of William de Bardelby, who was Keeper of the Great Seal of the Realm in the reign of King Edward II. Also Robert de Bardelby was an English judge at the beginning of the 14th century.

William de Bardelby was vicar of Coberley in Gloucestershire in 1316; he then moved to Ireland where he was presented to the living of Garristown, in north County Dublin, in 1318. In 1320 Nicholas Babau acknowledged that William and Richard le Brun, Chief Baron of the Irish Exchequer, had the right to a crop of wheat from his lands in Balygoray (possibly Ballygorey, County Kilkenny).

In 1321 Roger de Sutton, a Royal clerk, who was journeying to England, appointed Bardelby his attorney to act for him in Ireland. In 1331 he had leave from the English Crown to go overseas for two years.

He became Master of the Rolls in Ireland in 1334 (being only the second holder of the office) and held that position until his death in 1337.

In 1335 the Privy Council of Ireland sanctioned a gift of 100 shillings from the Crown to Bardelby and the Irish Chancery clerks for their diligence in writing commissions for the office of the Escheator of Ireland. Shortly before his death, he made a grant of land at Borryn (unidentified) to Master Giles le Engles.
