= Purveyor =

Purveyor may refer to:

- A seller of dry goods; see Grocery store – early history
- Purveyance, in the U.K. the right of the Crown to requisition goods and services for royal use
