= John de Troye =

Welsh-born Crown official and judge

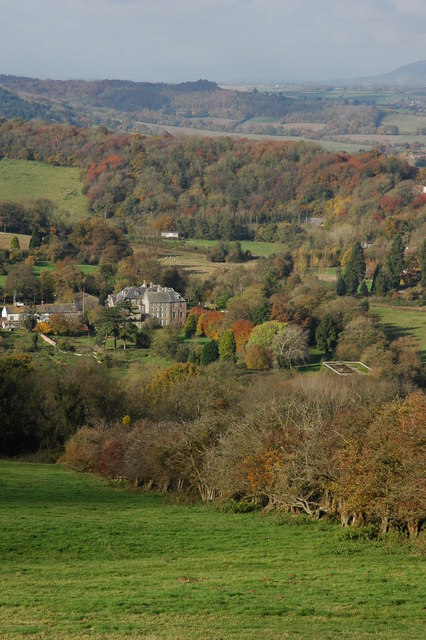
View of Mitchel Troy, John's birthplace

John de Troye (died 1371) was a Welsh-born Crown official and judge in fourteenth century Ireland, who held the offices of Chancellor of the Exchequer of Ireland and Lord Treasurer of Ireland. He was also a leading ecclesiastic, whose most senior clerical office was Chancellor of St. Patrick's Cathedral, Dublin. He was a notable pluralist.

He took his name from his birthplace, Mitchel Troy in Monmouthshire.

He is first heard of in Ireland in 1346 when he was a prebendary of the Diocese of Cloyne. On the temporary removal from the Irish Bench of William de Epworth, due to serious accusations of corruption in his office of steward of the royal lands, he became the second Baron of the Court of Exchequer (Ireland) in 1347. Epworth was restored to office the following year, having emerged triumphant from a lengthy inquiry into his alleged corruption, but Troye was permitted to continue to call himself a Baron and to draw a judge's salary, and was given another position in the Exchequer of Ireland as a Clerk of the Wages, his main responsibility being to act as paymaster of the army. Early in 1347, he went to England on what was described as important business immediately concerning the King. In 1358, he undertook several missions on the Crown's behalf in Munster and Leinster, for which the Privy Council ordered him to be reimbursed. In 1360, he granted the office of Chief Serjeant of County Louth jointly to John and Hugh Netterville. For a time he was the tenant of the royal manor of Esker, near Lucan, Dublin, which was generally reserved for favoured Crown servants. He was removed from the Court of Exchequer in 1364, as part of a general "shake-up" of Irish officials, but soon afterwards was compensated by appointment to the more senior office of Lord Treasurer of Ireland.

The Exchequer of Ireland was then divided into two rival factions: Troye was closely associated with the faction headed by John de Burnham, the Treasurer. From 1348 onwards, Burnham was under constant attack from the faction which was headed by William de Barton, who accused him of numerous financial irregularities, and he spent much of his time in England attempting to clear his name. Troye became involved in the controversy: he had already clashed with the English Exchequer over his accounts and been threatened with distraint of his property. He and Burnham were accused of corruptly diverting revenues to their own use, but they were both eventually cleared of all charges: the English Crown accepted that the suspicions arose largely from a technical misunderstanding about Irish auditing methods, and had been given an appearance of plausibility by the false allegations made by William de Barton, who had a personal grudge against Burnham.

Troye was a notorious pluralist: in addition to holding the prebend of Cloyne, and the Chancellorship of St. Patrick's Cathedral (the office of Chancellor had a number of benefices attached to it, including the prebend of Finglas), he was prebendary of Ferns and of Emly. He also held the English living of Amersham in Buckinghamshire. In 1352, he was granted the special privilege of being allowed to choose his own confessor, who had the power to give him absolution for his sins on his deathbed if he was truly penitent.

Troye became Lord Treasurer of Ireland in 1364 or 1365, and was made Chancellor of the Irish Exchequer in 1368. He probably died in 1371.
