= Oliver FitzEustace =

Irish judge

Oliver FitzEustace (died after 1491) was an Irish judge. His appointment as Chief Baron of the Irish Exchequer was a surprising one since according to the leading historian of the Irish judiciary he appears to have been unable to speak.

Oliver was the son of Rowland FitzEustace, 1st Baron Portlester (died 1496). Ball believed, probably correctly, that he was illegitimate since his father had several legitimate daughters but died without a male heir to the barony. Portlester was, apart from his son-in-law Gerald FitzGerald, 8th Earl of Kildare, perhaps the dominant Irish statesman of his time, and held office as Lord Treasurer of Ireland and Lord Chancellor of Ireland. As Chancellor, he was able to exercise judicial patronage and it was entirely due to his influence that Oliver was made Chief Baron in 1482.

He was installed without swearing an oath; according to Elrington Ball, this was because he could not understand or speak it. Stronger evidence of his lack of mental capacity is that his patent of office gave him the right to act through a Deputy, and that over the next decade the office of Chief Baron was normally exercised through the Deputy. These Deputies – John Burnell, John Estrete and Clement Fitzleones – were all lawyers of distinction. It seems to have been Oliver's father who made the actual appointments.

During the rebellion of Lambert Simnel, Oliver is listed as one of his supporters; on the face of it this contradicts the claim that he was mentally deficient, but his name may simply have been linked to that of his father, one of Simnel's strongest supporters. He shared in the pardon granted by King Henry VII of England to Simnel's followers in 1488. Having been removed from office, he was restored in 1491 to act jointly with his former deputy John Burnell. His date of death is uncertain.
