= Thomas Crosse =

Thomas Crosse may refer to:

- Thomas Crosse (priest) (1680–1736), Anglican clergyman, master of St Catharine's College, Cambridge, and vice-chancellor of the University of Cambridge.
- Sir Thomas Crosse, 1st Baronet (1663–1738), English brewer and politician, MP for Westminster
- Thomas Bright Crosse (1796–1886), British politician, MP for Wigan
- Thomas atte Crosse (died after 1348), English cleric, Crown official and judge

== See also ==
- Thomas Cross (disambiguation)
