= Nicholas de Balscote =

English-born Irish judge

Nicholas de Balscote (died 1320) was an English-born official and judge in fourteenth-century Ireland. He attained high judicial office, but his career was damaged by a quarrel with King Edward II.

== Career ==
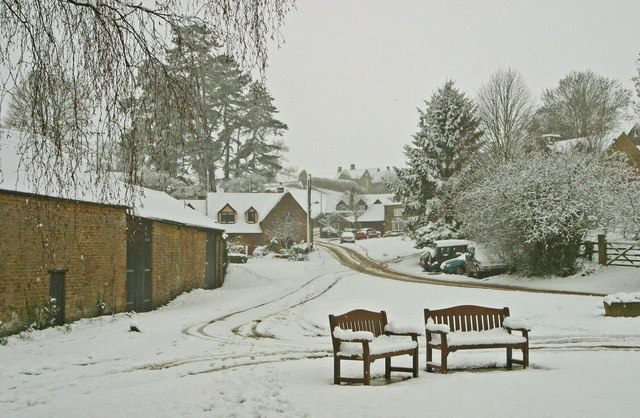
Balscote in the snow

He was born at Balscote in Oxfordshire, and probably belonged to the same family as Alexander de Balscot, who was to hold high office in Ireland as a cleric and judge two generations later.

He is first heard of as an official of the Exchequer of Ireland in 1303, and was subsequently appointed Archdeacon of Glendalough. In 1313 he was one of the attorneys appointed by John Wogan, the outgoing Justiciar of Ireland, to manage his legal affairs, presumably while Wogan was absent in England. Nicholas spent a considerable sum on the upkeep of the King's watermills in Dublin between 1311 and 1314. He became Chancellor of the Exchequer of Ireland in 1310, and Chief Baron of the Irish Exchequer in 1313. In 1317 he was spoken of as a possible Lord Chancellor of Ireland but was not appointed to that office. He became custodian of the Archdiocese of Dublin in the same year.

=== Downfall ===
In 1318 he claimed the right to be appointed to the office of Chancellor of St Patrick's Cathedral, Dublin; although the details of the matter are obscure, his claim for some reason gave great offence to the King. He was removed from office as Chief Baron in 1319 and died the following year. He was replaced as Chief Baron by Richard le Brun, who years earlier had been in his employment as attorney for his English affairs, and had recently been appointed a Baron of the Exchequer.

== Family ==
He left his property in Dublin to John de Balscote and his brother Ralph. Presumably, they were his nephews or cousins: he had appointed them as his attorneys the previous year. The property was taken into the Crown's hands, but after John and Ralph petitioned the Crown for redress, the Lord Chancellor of Ireland was ordered to grant them a lease of it. John was a clerk in the Royal service: he became Chief Chamberlain of the Exchequer of Ireland in 1331, and was still in office in 1344, when he had been joined in the Royal service by yet another Balscote relative, John de Balscote junior. The elder John held the living of Callan, County Kilkenny, and was still alive in 1356. Ralph was also a clerk, but little is known about him. It is probably the younger John who was Deputy Treasurer of Ireland in 1354.

Alexander de Balscot, also called Alexander Petit (died 1400) was probably another relative of Nicholas. As Lord Chancellor of Ireland and Bishop of Meath, he effectively dominated Irish politics in the last three decades of the fourteenth century.
