= Thomas Corrigan =

Thomas Corrigan may refer to:

- Thomas C. Corrigan (1938–2022), American politician
- Thomas Corrigan (priest) (1928–2011), Irish Anglican priest
- Tom Corrigan (Australian politician) (1884–1952), Labor member of the Victorian Legislative Assembly
- Tommy Corrigan (1903–1943), Australian rules footballer
- Tom Corrigan (jockey) (1854–1894), Australian Hall of Fame jockey
- Thomas Corrigan (transit executive), owner of company that had the franchise to operate one of Kansas City's early Streetcar systems
- Tomás Corrigan (born 1990), Gaelic footballer
