= Robert de Emeldon =

English crown official and judge

Robert de Emeldon, or Embleton (died 1355) was an English-born Crown official and judge who spent much of his career in Ireland. He held several important public offices, including Attorney-General for Ireland, Lord High Treasurer of Ireland and Chief Baron of the Irish Exchequer. He was a turbulent and violent man, who was guilty of at least one homicide, was imprisoned for a number of serious crimes including rape and manslaughter, and had a reputation for corruption: but he was a royal favourite of King Edward III and was thus able to survive his temporary disgrace in the early 1350s.

== Early career ==
Embleton Church, late nineteenth century: Robert was born in Embleton

He took his name from his birthplace, Embleton, Northumberland. He also had links with Newcastle-upon-Tyne, as he was a cousin of Richard de Emeldon, who was five times Mayor of Newcastle between 1305 and 1332, having moved there from Embleton.Robert became parish priest of Lesbury, Northumberland in 1329.

He was an official in the English Chancery for many years: Gilbert states that he was a great favourite of Edward III, who had known him since childhood. He came to Ireland about 1335 and was appointed a prebendary in the Diocese of Clonfert. He was almost certainly a qualified lawyer: the Chief Baron of the Irish Exchequer then did not always have legal qualifications, but the King's Attorney was invariably a professional advocate.

== Homicide ==
The Patent Rolls have a terse entry for 18 January 1336:

Pardon to Robert of Emeldon in consideration for his services to the King in Ireland for the death of Ralph de Byrton, knight, and of any consequent outlawries.

No further details of the crime or of the victim are given, although the list of charges brought against Emeldon in 1350 included at least one charge of manslaughter. The reference to his services to the King suggests that the Crown, even at this early stage of his career, saw him as too valuable an official for his services to be lightly dispensed with. A royal pardon was relatively easy to obtain, even for such a serious crime, and this ability of serious criminals to evade justice seems to have become a matter of scandal only in the following century.

== Later career ==
In 1340, Emeldon became Chancellor of the Exchequer of Ireland, and the attached position of Clerk of the Exchequer of Pleas, and was sworn a member of the Privy Council of Ireland. He also became Archdeacon of Kells. He was appointed Treasurer of Connacht in 1341, and was entrusted with the task of receiving on the Crown's behalf the profits of all lands in Connacht held by William Donn de Burgh, 3rd Earl of Ulster, who had been murdered in 1333; the Earl held these lands as tenant in chief from the King. In 1346 he was rewarded for his good services to the Crown, after he accompanied Sir Ralph d'Ufford, the Justiciar of Ireland, on a campaign against Maurice FitzGerald, 1st Earl of Desmond. During d'Ufford's brief government of Ireland (1344-6) Emeldon's own influence was at its height.

He was appointed Attorney General for Ireland (King's Attorney), which was a relatively new office, in March 1348 and Lord High Treasurer shortly afterwards. The vacancy in the Lord Treasurer's office arose from charges of corruption and negligence, which ultimately proved to be groundless, made against Emeldon's predecessor, John de Burnham, who was required to spend several years in England clearing his name. The main instigator of the charges was William de Barton, a disgruntled former Keeper of Works at the Exchequer of Ireland, who had been removed from office by Burnham on the curious ground that he suffered from violent convulsions. Emeldon, unlike Barton, benefited directly from Burnham's long absence from Ireland, and although there is no firm evidence of his complicity, it is possible that he was involved in the accusations against Burnham, and also Chief Purveyor. He was certainly an ally of Barton, and recommended him for appointment to another senior position, Chief Engrosser (copier)in the Court of Exchequer (Ireland), in 1348. Emeldon himself quickly embarked on an enthusiastic career of embezzlement and bribery.

== Disgrace ==
In 1350 the new Lord Lieutenant of Ireland, Sir Thomas de Rokeby, launched a campaign to remove corrupt Irish Government officials, of whom the most notorious was Emeldon, who was arrested and imprisoned shortly after Rokeby's arrival in Ireland, on charges of corruption. In Emeldon's case "corruption" seems to have meant not only financial dishonesty in the usual sense (although there was plenty of evidence of that), but also numerous crimes of violence, including assault, malicious wounding, rape, robbery and manslaughter. He was also accused of refusing to fund a military expedition in County Wicklow. Emeldon, instead of immediately protesting his innocence, pleaded benefit of clergy. It is likely that some of the charges against him were true; he had of course already been pardoned for killing Ralph de Byrton in 1336. Perhaps aware that his plea might be seen as an admission of his guilt, he quickly changed his stance. He pleaded his innocence at a hearing in the ecclesiastical court of the Archbishop of Dublin, and was given absolution, and announced his willingness to appear before the King personally. The matter was accordingly referred to the King and Council.

== Pardon and last years ==
Due to the favour he enjoyed with the King, who maintained that he was a "loyal and always faithful servant", Emeldon was soon released from prison and received a second royal pardon, and the restoration of his confiscated lands and goods, despite Rokeby's protests. He became Chief Baron in 1351 and died in office in 1355. His last years apparently passed without serious incident
