= Walter de Islip =

English-born cleric and statesman

Walter de Islip, Isleep or de Istlep (died after 1348) was an English-born cleric, statesman, and judge in fourteenth-century Ireland. He was the first Chief Baron of the Irish Exchequer; he also held the offices of Treasurer of Ireland, Chief Escheator, and Custos Rotulorum of Kilkenny. He was a noted pluralist, who held numerous benefices. His career was seriously damaged by accusations of corruption and maladministration. He played an important role in the celebrated Kilkenny Witchcraft Trials of 1324.

== Personal life ==
Walter was born at Islip, Oxfordshire. He was a cousin of Simon Islip, Archbishop of Canterbury, and no doubt his career benefited as a result, though he was some years older than Simon. His father is said to have been a cleric, so Walter may have been illegitimate. The most influential patron in his early years was Richard de Ferings, Archbishop of Dublin 1299-1306; he probably arrived in Ireland in the Archbishop's entourage in 1299.

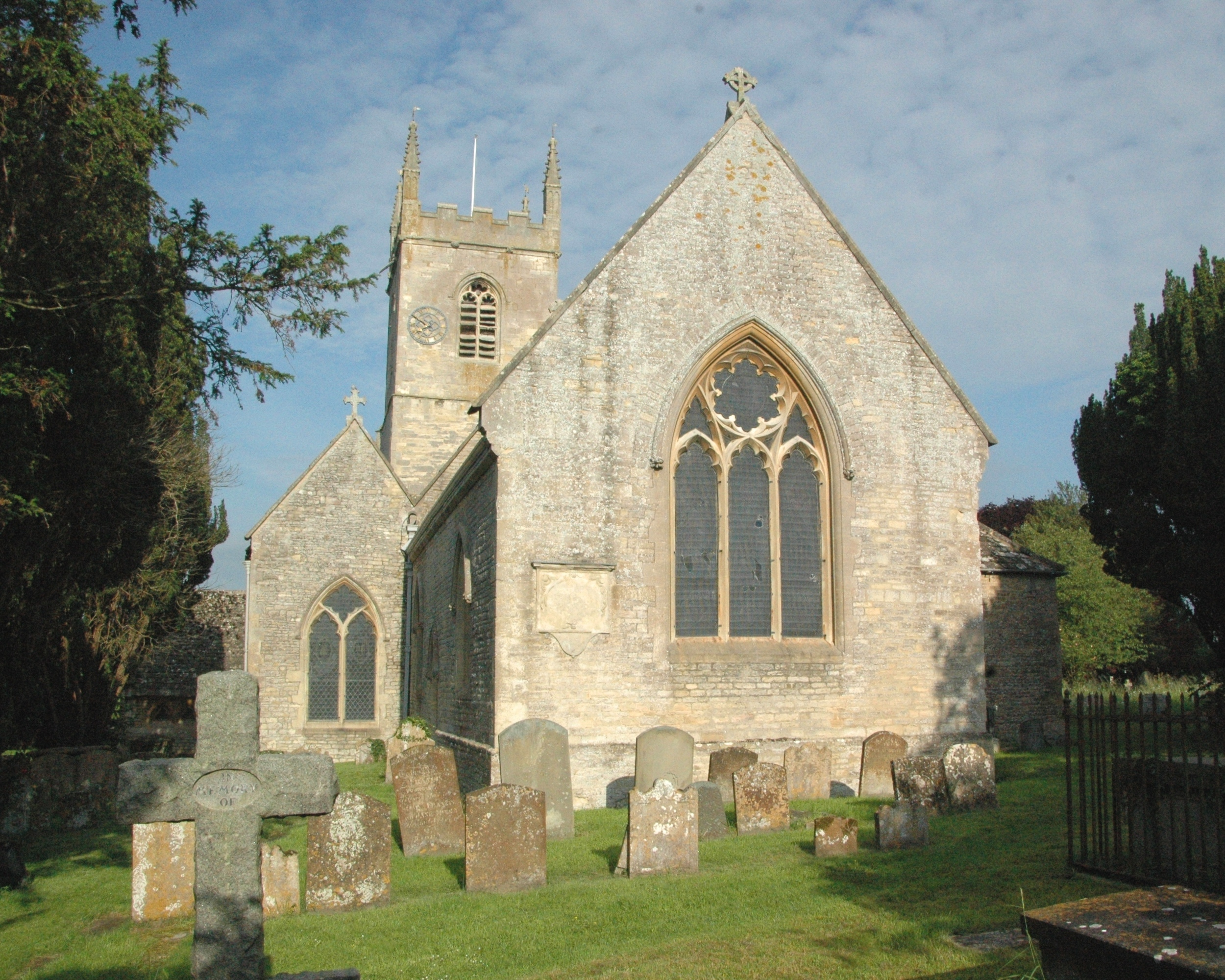
St Nicholas' Church, Islip - Walter was an Islip native

Throughout his career, Walter moved back and forth between Ireland and England. In Ireland, he lived for a time at the Priory of Kilmainham, where he had a standing agreement for his board and lodgings. He later purchased the manor of Thorncastle, in south Dublin County, which is roughly present-day Mount Merrion. The property had previously belonged to his colleague, Sir William le Deveneys, who died in 1319. Later in the century the new owner, Sir John Cruys, built Merrion Castle on the site. Walter also had a townhouse in Dublin on Rochel Street (now Back Lane), near Dublin Castle; there is a reference to Dublin Corporation supplying his house with water. Walter, in turn, made a side agreement with his neighbour and fellow judge Nicholas Fastolf and his wife Cecilia in 1329, by which the Fastolfs could insert a pipe "no wider than a goose quill" into Walter's cistern and draw off a supply of water. He developed strong links with Kilkenny, where he usually lodged with the Outlaw family, who were at the heart of the witchcraft trials.

== Career ==
In 1308 he was chosen as one of the Barons of the new Court of Exchequer (Ireland); he was given the title of Chief Baron in 1309, but stepped down from office in 1311. He is mentioned again as a Baron of the Exchequer in 1335. He was appointed Chief Escheator of Ireland in 1310.

=== Corruption ===
He served three terms as Lord Treasurer between 1314 and 1325. During the Scottish Invasion of Ireland 1315-18 he was the official principally charged with raising funds for the defence of Dublin. He was ordered to reside in Dublin Castle and ensure that its defences were adequate. He was also ordered to cooperate fully with John Hotham, the former Chancellor of the Exchequer of Ireland and future Bishop of Ely, who had returned to Ireland and been given wide-ranging powers of government for the duration of the crisis: effectively Hotham was Governor of Ireland.

In 1325 he attended a seemingly routine Exchequer audit in London, where grave irregularities in the Exchequer of Ireland came to light. Serious questions were raised about Islip's integrity, and in one of the first examples of an official inquiry in Ireland, a Dublin jury was selected to determine the truth of the allegations of fraud and corruption against him. Alexander de Bicknor, the Archbishop of Dublin and Lord Chancellor of Ireland, was accused of the same offences. Islip was finally removed from office as Treasurer: he was imprisoned for a time in the Fleet Prison, and his goods were seized. Bicknor, despite his archepiscopal rank, suffered the same punishment. In 1334 Walter was ordered to repay the Crown the then-considerable sum of £1332, and in default of repayment, most of his Irish lands were forfeited. In 1336 he obtained a royal pardon for all his faults and transgressions; at an unknown date he also obtained a reversal of the excommunication pronounced against him in 1329. Bicknor also received a pardon, despite his previous unsuccessful attempt to forge one.

=== Last years ===
He held office as Custos rotulorum for Kilkenny. In 1339 he rented out a number of houses to the Exchequer as temporary accommodation for its offices (the Exchequer had no permanent home until it moved to Carlow in about 1360). In 1339/40 the Prior of the Priory of All Hallows near Dublin granted him a pension. In 1342 he entered an agreement with the Corporation for the supply of his drinking water. It is possible that he returned to Kilmainham Priory to spend his final years. Exchequer payments of rent for the accommodation of the Exchequer offices in houses owned by him continued until 1346-8.

=== John de Grauntsete ===
In 1329 he was engaged in litigation in the Court of the Justiciar over the possession of lands with one William de London; the striking feature of the case was that de London was represented by one of Islip's colleagues on the Bench, John de Grauntsete. Such conduct seems to have been unheard of even at the time: Cohen calls it "startling", and without parallel in legal history. Grauntsete's conduct is even more striking since he was apparently the tenant of the land in question himself. De Grauntsete was soon afterwards removed from the Bench for a time: the reason for this was apparently not his conduct in Court, but the fact that he had read out letters of excommunication directed to Islip from the Pope, thus allegedly subverting the Royal authority.

== Kilkenny Witch Trials ==
The Kilkenny witch trials of 1324, in which the principal accused were Alice Kyteler, her son William Outlaw and Petronilla de Meath, deeply divided the Anglo-Irish ruling class. This was partly because many of them were connected to Kyteler through her four marriages (notably her brother-in-law Roger Utlagh, or Outlawe, Prior of the Knights Hospitallers at Kilmainham), (the brother of her first husband, William Outlawe senior) and partly because the English-born Bishop of Ossory, Richard de Ledrede, the driving force behind the prosecutions, was bitterly unpopular. Islip seems to have been firmly on the side of the accused witches (William Outlaw was a personal friend): as Custos of Kilkenny, he refused to order their arrest and was probably a party to the Bishop's own arrest and brief imprisonment. He was also on the best of terms with Prior Roger Utlagh, his sister-in-law Alice Kyteler's firm champion: when dining at Kilmainham, Walter, as a special mark of favour, was always seated beside his host.

== Pluralist ==
Although Walter, unlike his cousin Simon, did not reach the highest ranks of the Church, his career is a striking example of religious pluralism. In England he was vicar of Gresham, Norfolk and of Old Whittington, Derbyshire; in 1318 he became Dean of Wolverhampton. In Ireland, he was a canon of St. Patrick's Cathedral, custodian of the Archdiocese of Dublin, Treasurer of Ferns Cathedral and a prebendary in the dioceses of Ossory and Waterford.

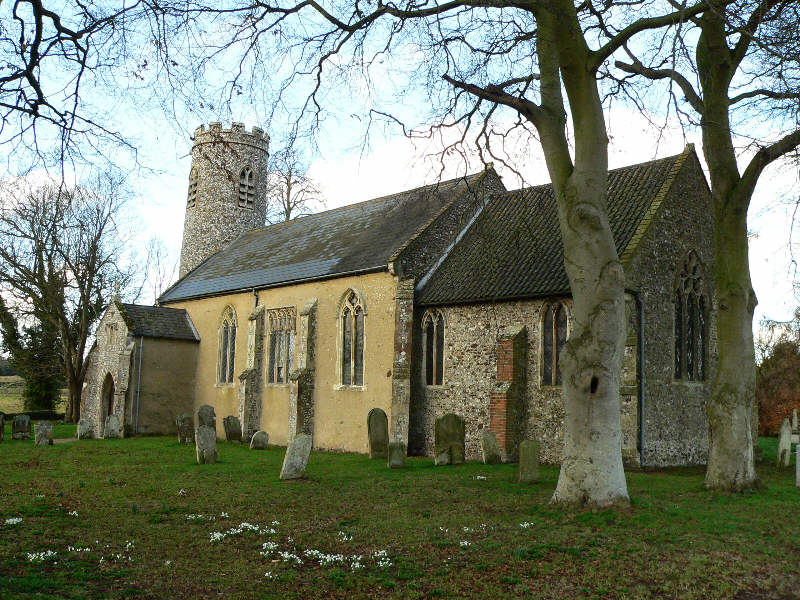
All Saints Church, Gresham, one of Walter's numerous livings
