= Baron Louth =

Irish peerage

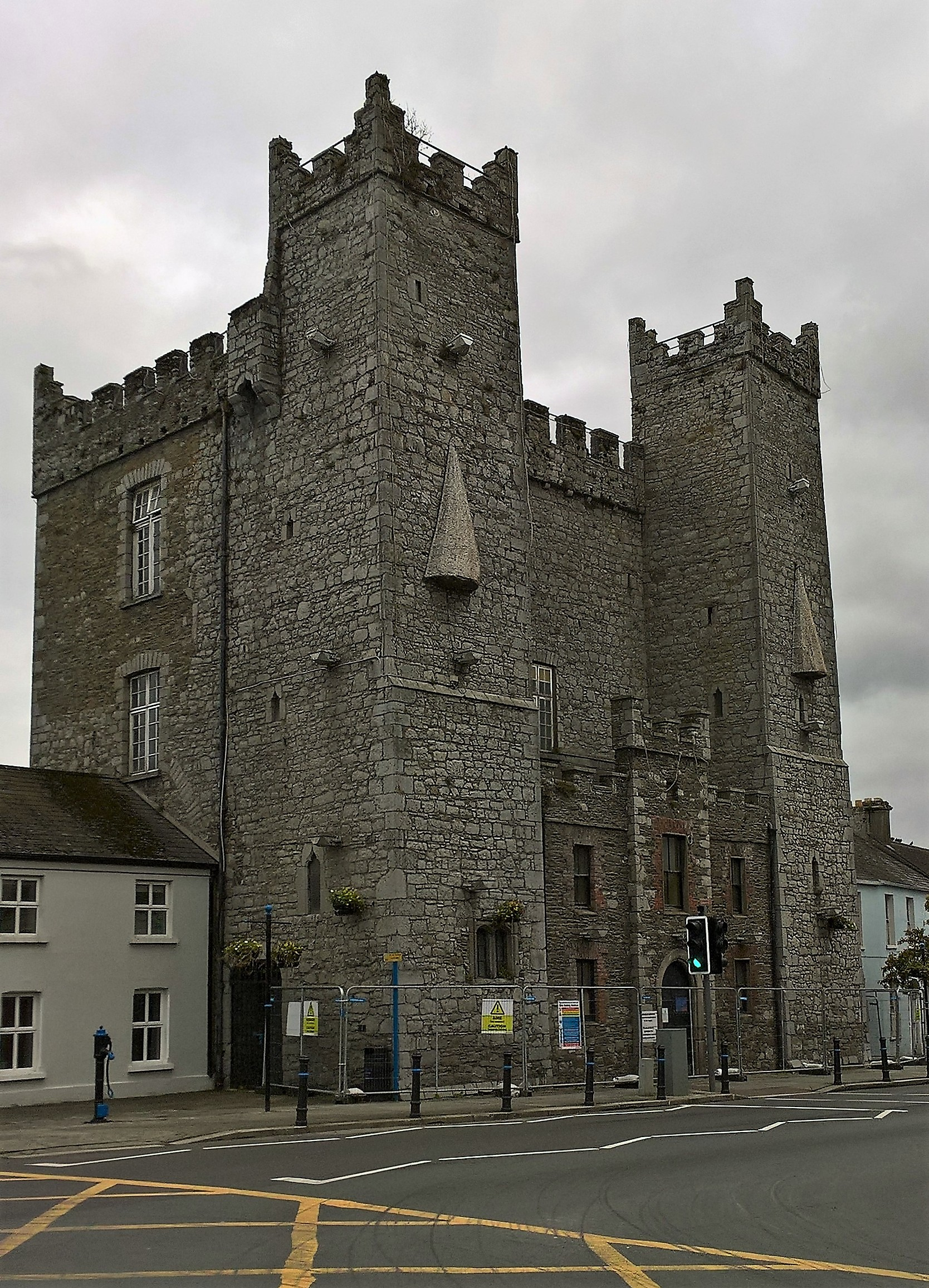
County Louth, Ardee Castle.

Baron Louth is a title in the Peerage of Ireland. It has been created twice.

== History ==
The title was created firstly c. 1458 for Sir Thomas Bathe, later Chief Baron of the Irish Exchequer. Although he had at least one son, John Bathe of Ardee, the title seems to have become extinct soon after his death in 1478.

It was created secondly in 1541 for Sir Oliver Plunkett. His great-great-great-grandson, the seventh Baron, served as Lord Lieutenant of County Louth. However, he later supported King James II and was outlawed. His great-great-grandson, the eleventh Baron, managed to obtain a reversal of the outlawry and was restored to the title. As of 2019 the title is held by the latter's great-great-great-great-grandson, the seventeenth Baron, who succeeded his father in 2013.

Admiral Peter Warren was a female-line great-grandson of the fifth Baron.

Saint Oliver Plunkett was very distantly related to the Barons of Louth.

Not to be confused with the title of Earl of Louth.

=== Barons Louth, first creation (c.1458) ===
- Thomas Bathe, 1st Baron Louth (died 1478)

=== Barons Louth, second creation (1541) ===
- Oliver Plunkett, 1st Baron Louth (died 1555)
- Thomas Plunkett, 2nd Baron Louth (died 1571)
- Patrick Plunkett, 3rd Baron Louth (1548–1575)
- Oliver Plunkett, 4th Baron Louth (died 1607), brother of the 3rd baron
- Matthew Plunkett, 5th Baron Louth (died 1629)
- Oliver Plunkett, 6th Baron Louth (1608–1679)
- Matthew Plunkett, 7th Baron Louth (died 1689) (outlawed)
- Oliver Plunkett, ''de jure'' 8th Baron Louth (1668–1707)
- Matthew Plunkett, de jure 9th Baron Louth (1698–1754)
- Oliver Plunkett, ''de jure'' 10th Baron Louth (1727–1763)
- Thomas Oliver Plunkett, 11th Baron Louth (1757–1823) (restored to title)
- Thomas Oliver Plunkett, 12th Baron Louth (1809–1849)
- Randal Percy Otway Plunkett, 13th Baron Louth (1832–1883)
- Randal Pilgrim Ralph Plunkett, 14th Baron Louth (1868–1941)
- Otway Randal Percy Oliver Plunkett, 15th Baron Louth (1892–1950)
- Otway Michael James Oliver Plunkett, 16th Baron Louth (1929–2013)
- Jonathan Oliver Plunkett, 17th Baron Louth (born 1952)

The heir apparent is the present holder's son Hon. Matthew Oliver Plunkett (born 1982)
The heir apparent's heir, and the next in line, is his elder son Samuel Murray Plunkett (born 2012)

== Seat ==
The family seat was Louth Hall, near Ardee, County Louth.
