= Charles Meredyth (died 1700) =

Anglo-Irish politician

Sir Charles Meredyth (died November 1700) was an Anglo-Irish politician who was Chancellor of the Exchequer of Ireland.

He was the son of Sir Robert Meredyth and Anne Ussher.

Meredyth sat in the Irish House of Commons as the Member of Parliament for Old Leighlin from 1661 to 1666. He was knighted in Ireland on 4 Sep 1664 and made a member of the Privy Council of Ireland in August 1671. In 1674 he was appointed Chancellor of the Exchequer, serving in the role until 1687 when he was replaced by the Roman Catholic Bruno Talbot by James II. He was reinstated to the position by William III in 1690. He represented the Gowran constituency from 1692 to 1693. He surrendered the office of Chancellor in 1695 and died in England five years later.

Parliament of Ireland
Preceded by Peter Wybrants; Roger Brereton	Member of Parliament for Old Leighlin; 1661–1666; With: Sir Francis Butler	Succeeded by Darby Long; Daniel Doran
Preceded by Richard Butler; Robert Fielding	Member of Parliament for Gowran; 1692–1693; With: George Warburton	Succeeded by Edward May; Joseph Stepney
Political offices
Preceded by Richard Jones	Chancellor of the Exchequer of Ireland; 1674–1687	Succeeded by Bruno Talbot
Preceded by Bruno Talbot	Chancellor of the Exchequer of Ireland; 1690–1695	Succeeded by Philip Savage
