= Robert de Bardelby =

Robert de Bardelby (fl. 1323), was an English judge. He may have taken his last name from Barlby, North Yorkshire, as did William de Bardelby.

Bardelby acted in a subordinate capacity as one of the keepers of the great seal between 1302 and 1321. He was prebendary of York in 1305. In 1315 he was appointed keeper of the hospital of St. Thomas Martyr of Acon in London, during the temporary absence of Richard of Southampton. In 1315 he was assigned as one of the commissioners to hear petitions to parliament (then sitting at Lincoln), and was entrusted with the business of answering petitions in the parliament of 1320 at Westminster. In 1323 he is mentioned as canon of Chichester Cathedral in a writ appointing him one of a commission of justices directed to try certain commissioners of array accused of acts of malversation and oppression, and in 1325 as ‘clericus cancellarius’ in a memorandum of the appointment of Henry de Clyf as keeper of the rolls.
