= Balscote =

Village in Oxfordshire, England

Coordinates: 52.078°N 01.427°W

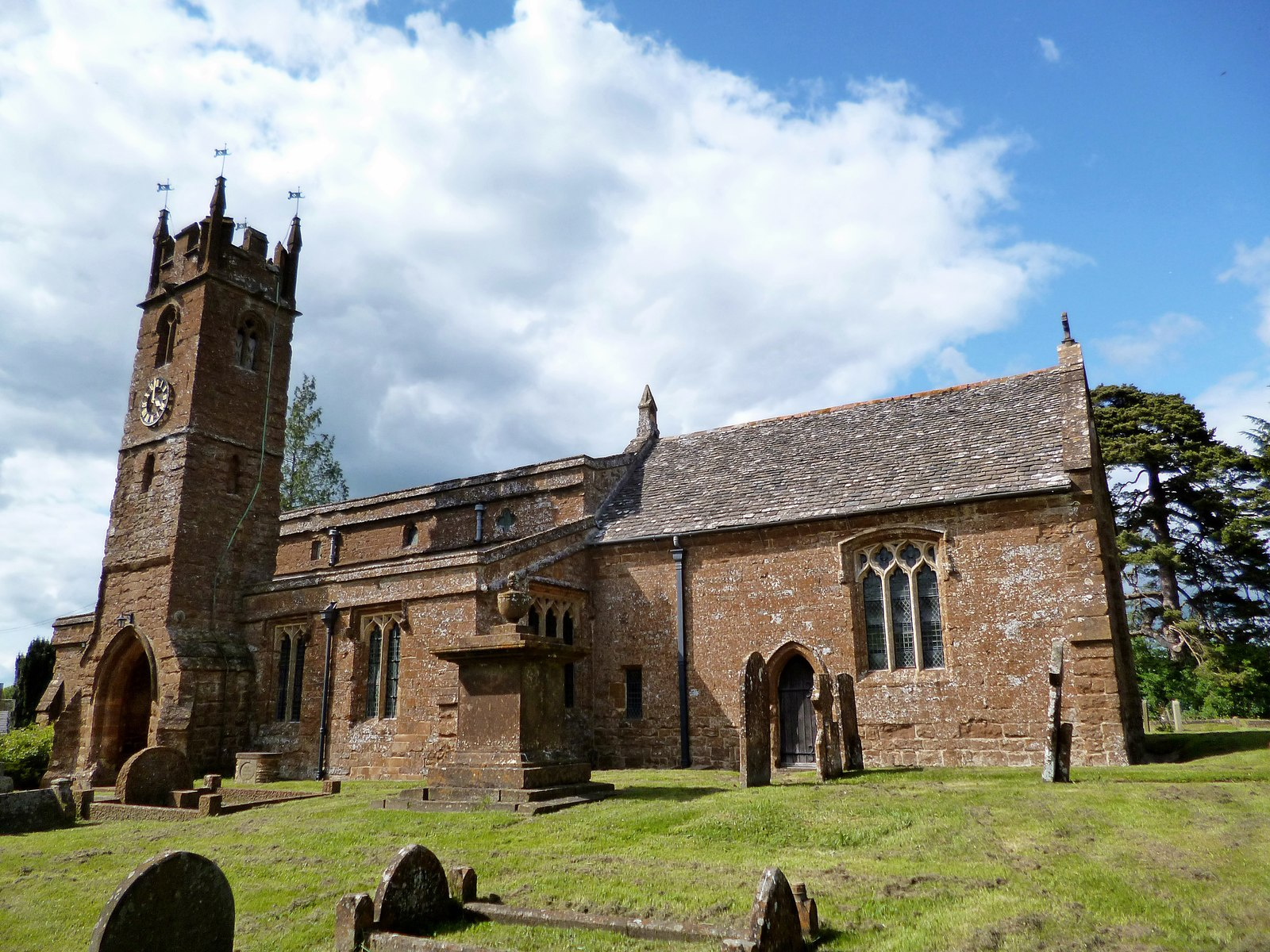
- Parish church of St Mary Magdalene

- Location within Oxfordshire
- OS grid reference: SP3941
- Civil parish: Wroxton
- District: Cherwell
- Shire county: Oxfordshire
- Region: South East
- Country: England
- Sovereign state: United Kingdom
- Post town: Banbury
- Postcode district: OX15
- Dialling code: 01295
- Police: Thames Valley
- Fire: Oxfordshire
- Ambulance: South Central
- UK Parliament: Banbury
- Website: Wroxton & Balscote Community Web Site

Balscote or Balscott is a village in the civil parish of Wroxton, Oxfordshire, about 4 miles (6.4 km) west of Banbury. The Domesday Book of 1086 records the place-name as Berescote. Curia regis rolls from 1204 and 1208 record it as Belescot. An entry in the Book of Fees for 1242 records it as Balescot. Its origin is Old English, meaning the cottage, house or manor of a man called Bælli.

== Church and chapel ==
=== Church of England ===
The earliest features of the Church of England parish church of St Mary Magdalene include a Norman font and an Early English Gothic window. Most of the present church building is 14th-century, built in a Decorated Gothic style. It is a Grade II* listed building. The parish of St Mary Magdalene is now one of eight in the Ironstone Benefice.

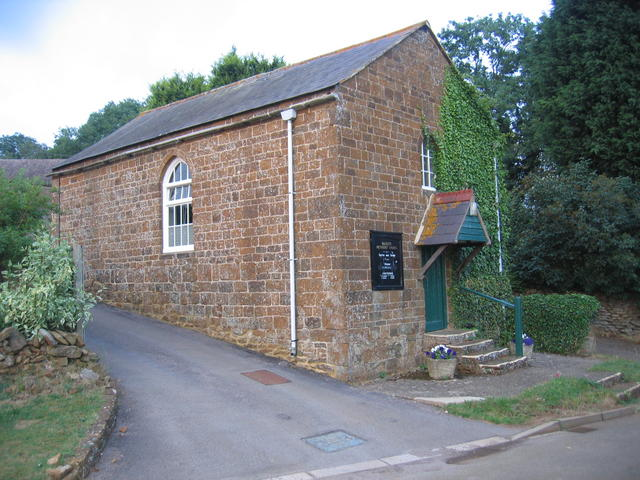
Balscote Methodist chapel

=== Methodist chapel ===
Balscote had a Methodist chapel but this has now been converted into a private home.

== Secular buildings ==
Much of the village is designated as a conservation area, with many of Balscote's buildings being of local Hornton Stone. Priory Farm is a 14th-century hall, extended in the 15th century and modernised in the 17th and 18th centuries. Grange Farm is a 15th- or early 16th-century house, extended and modernised in the 17th and 18th centuries. Both houses may have been built by the owners of nearby Wroxton Abbey.

Balscote has a public house, The Butchers Arms, which is controlled by the Hook Norton Brewery. In 1996 Balscote Village Hall Trust, a registered charity, started planning and fund-raising to build a community hall. Building began in October 2010 and was completed in 2011. It is a timber building.

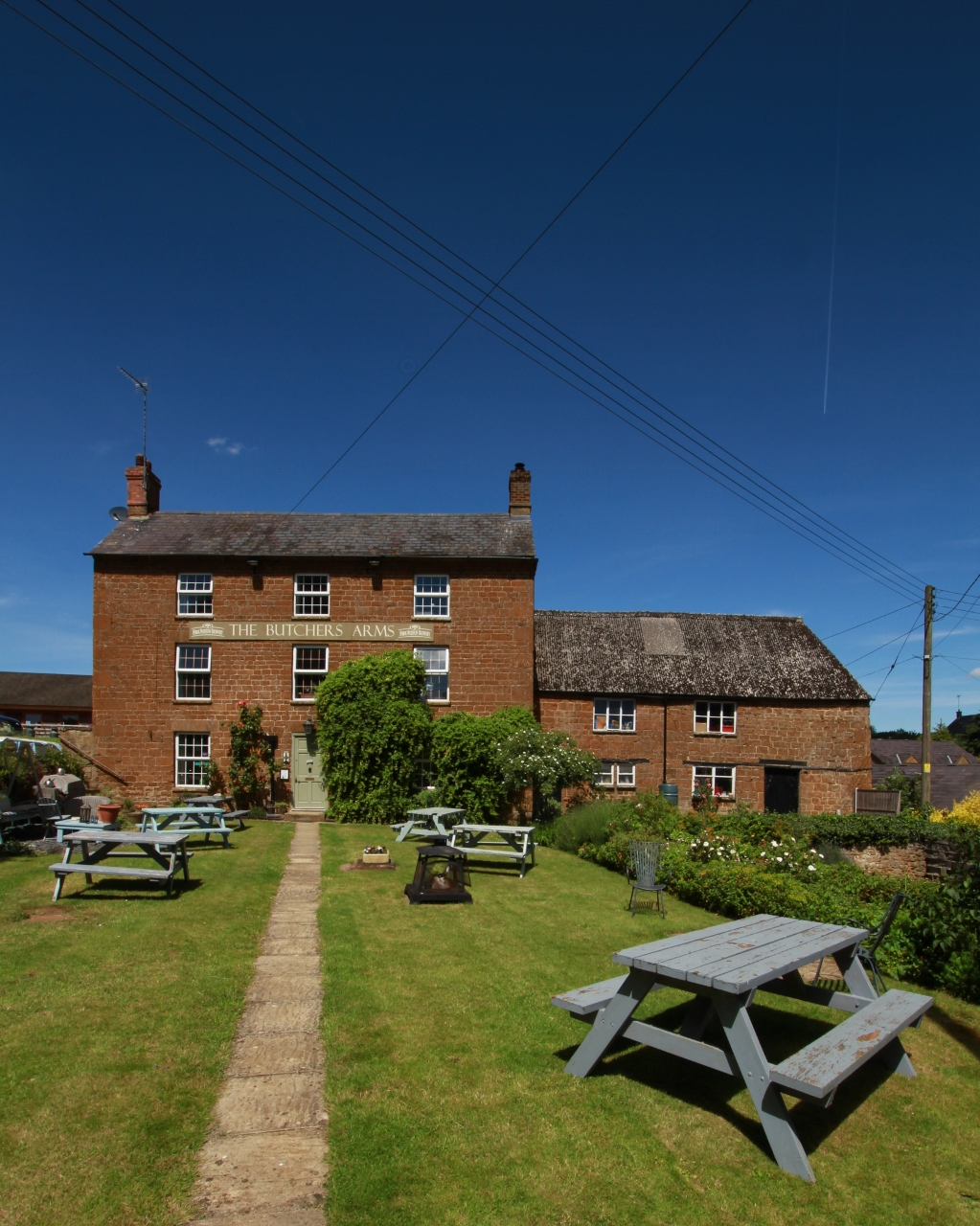
The Butchers Arms

== Notable residents ==
- Nicholas de Balscote (died 1320), Chief Baron of the Irish Exchequer, was born in Balscote.
- Alexander Petit (died 1400), one of the dominant figures in late 14th-century Ireland, was also a native of Balscote. He held many important offices including Bishop of Ossory, Bishop of Meath and Lord Chancellor of Ireland. As was usual at the time he was more commonly referred to, not by his family name, but his birthplace, as Alexander de Balscot. He may have been a relative of Nicholas de Balscote, who is known to have appointed several family members to important positions in Ireland, or they may simply have shared a birthplace.

== Bibliography ==
- Ekwall, Eilert (1960) [1936]. Concise Oxford Dictionary of English Place-Names (4th ed.). Oxford: Oxford University Press. Balscott. ISBN 0198691033.
- Lobel, Mary D; Crossley, Alan, eds. (1969). "Wroxton". A History of the County of Oxford. Victoria County History. Vol. 9: Bloxham Hundred. London: Oxford University Press for the Institute of Historical Research. pp. 171–188. ISBN 978-0-19722-726-8.
- O'Flanagan, J Roderick (1870). Lives of the Lord Chancellors of Ireland. Dublin: Longmans Green.
- Sherwood, Jennifer; Pevsner, Nikolaus (1974). Oxfordshire. The Buildings of England. Harmondsworth: Penguin Books. pp. 428–429. ISBN 0-14-071045-0.
