= Archdeacon of Meath =

The archdeacon of Meath is a senior ecclesiastical officer within the united Diocese of Meath and Kildare.

The archdeaconry can trace its history from Helias, the first known incumbent, who held the office in the twelfth century, to the last discrete incumbent Thomas George Corrigan. who retired in 1996 when his role was merged with that of Kildare. As such he was responsible for the disciplinary supervision of the clergy and the upkeep of diocesan property within his half of the diocese.

Thomas Bache, Archdeacon of Meath for many years (c.1365-1410) was a leading judge and statesman, who served as Chief Baron of the Irish Exchequer, and Lord Treasurer of Ireland in 1400–1402. His successor William Yonge, or Young (died c.1437), who was appointed Archdeacon in 1412, and was still in office in 1435, was like Bache a political and judicial figure of considerable importance, who held office as Lord Chancellor of Ireland. Hugh Inge, Archbishop of Dublin 1521–8, had also been Archdeacon of Meath, a position he held in conjunction with Bishop of Meath.
