= Richard Golding =

Irish judge

Richard Golding or Goldynge (died 1520) was an Irish judge who was twice Chief Baron of the Irish Exchequer. The Golding family were notable for producing three judges of the same Court in two generations.

He was born in County Meath, son of Edward Golding (died after 1504), Baron of the Court of Exchequer (Ireland) and collector of revenues for the port of Drogheda. Richard's cousin Walter Golding of Portmarnock (died 1547) was also Baron of Exchequer, and acted as legal adviser to the Lord Deputy of Ireland, Leonard Grey, 1st Viscount Grane.

Richard entered Lincoln's Inn in 1505 and acted as Master of the Revels there in 1509. He was practising law in Dublin in 1511 when he was appointed Chief Baron; he was superseded in 1514 but restored to office shortly afterwards, and apparently remained Chief Baron until his death.

He married a daughter of Sir William Darcy of Platten and Margaret St Lawrence, daughter of Nicholas St Lawrence, 4th Baron Howth; they seem to have had no children. His cousin Walter's descendants were still living at Portmarnock in the following century.
