= Thomas Bathe =

Irish noble (d. 1478)

Thomas Bathe, 1st Baron Louth (died 1478) was an Irish peer, barrister and judge of the fifteenth century. Even by the standards of that turbulent age, he had a troubled and violent career. He was deprived of his estates and outlawed by Act of Parliament, but was later restored to favour. His claim to the title Baron Louth was eventually recognised by the English Crown, and he ended his career as Chief Baron of the Irish Exchequer.

== Early life ==
He belonged to the leading Anglo-Irish Bathe family, who were prominent landowners in County Meath, and whose principal seat was at Athcarne, near Duleek. From the 1450s on he claimed the title "Lord and Baron of Louth" and the right to be summoned to Parliament as a peer: his right to the title and the summons was denied by the Irish Parliament in 1460, but restored in 1476.

As a young man, he seems to have been quarrelsome and turbulent, and his reputation for violence was to cloud his later life. He was in London in 1439, probably studying law, when he was charged with "ill conversation and behaviour", and committed to Ludgate Prison, from which his brother obtained his release. Whether he had actually committed a criminal offence, or whether the authorities simply regarded him as a troublemaker, is unclear.

== Dr. Stackpole ==
Far more serious charges (the most serious of which were demonstrably false) were levelled against Bathe in 1449, and these formed the main grounds for the indictment against him in the Irish Parliament of 1460. He was accused of a serious assault on Dr. John Stackpole, a priest attached to Bective Abbey. It seems that Stackpole had been installed as the parish priest of Kilberry, County Kildare, a living which Bathe claimed was his to dispose of under the traditional right of advowson. The dispute between the two men led Stackpole to ask the Bishop of Meath for Bathe's excommunication: it was alleged that in revenge Bathe kidnapped and imprisoned him. However the most serious charge, that Bathe had Stackpole's eyes and tongue removed, was clearly an invention, since the indictment revealed that Stackpole, allegedly "by a miracle", was in fact in full possession of his faculties of sight and speech. This incident did not harm Bathe's career in the short term: he was knighted and appointed Chief Escheator of Ireland in 1450, with power to appoint a Deputy. He was also receiver of the manors of Chapelizod and Leixlip, which were the property of the Knights Hospitallers, until 1455.

== Wars of the Roses ==
In the late 1450s the Wars of the Roses, the dynastic conflict between the rival branches of the Plantagenet dynasty, spread to Ireland, where Richard of York, the Yorkist claimant to the Crown of England, found his strongest support. The ruling House of Lancaster was supported by James Butler, 5th Earl of Ormonde, with whom Bathe was closely allied. The English Parliament of 1459, popularly known as the Parliament of Devils, appointed Ormonde Lord Lieutenant of Ireland, with Bathe as his Deputy. However York was still very powerful in Ireland and Bathe's appointment never took effect.

York summoned the Irish Parliament at Drogheda in 1460: this Parliament ordered "Thomas Bathe" - referred to ominously as the "pretended Lord Louth" - to appear and answer numerous charges, of which the most serious was his alleged torture of Dr Stackpole in 1449. Understandably Bathe did not choose to appear. He was outlawed and deprived of his estates, although it seems that he was able to have a portion of them regranted to his son John Bathe of Ardee. It was explicitly stated in the verdict of Parliament that Bathe "shall never have place in the Parliament of this land or hold any office under the King's grant".

== Later years ==
Despite the triumph of the Yorkist cause in 1461, Bathe's disgrace was not permanent: York's son, the new King Edward IV, where possible followed a policy of reconciliation with his former enemies. Bathe's estates were restored to him in 1472 and even his much-disputed title of Baron Louth was acknowledged: in 1468 he used the title when witnessing a royal grant of murage (the right to levy a toll for the upkeep of the town walls) to the town of Drogheda, and a statute of 1476 appoints Thomas Bathe "Lord and Baron of Louth" as one of the commissioners to fix the boundaries of County Louth. He was appointed Chief Baron of the Irish Exchequer in 1473 and held office until 1478 when he apparently died. He had at least one son, John Bathe of Ardee, but the title Baron Louth seems to have lapsed on his death. It was recreated for the Plunkett family in 1541. He also had cousins, including presumably the John Bathe who was admitted to Lincoln's Inn in 1475-6. Members of the Bathe family in later generations achieved distinction as judges. James Bathe, who died in 1570, and was like Thomas a Chief Baron of the Exchequer, was one of his cousins.
