= John de Burnham =

English-born Irish judge

John de Burnham, or John Brunham (died 1363) was an English-born cleric, judge and Crown official who spent much of his career in Ireland. He held office as Lord High Treasurer of Ireland and Chief Baron of the Irish Exchequer. He spent many years defending himself against charges of corruption, which seem to have been the invention of malicious colleagues.

== Early life ==
He was the son of William Burnham of Norfolk, and was probably born in one of the groups of adjacent villages called the Norfolk Burnhams. He had the title "Master", which at the time meant that he had a University degree. He took holy orders, and his first benefice was a living in Lincolnshire. He became parish priest of Felmersham, Bedfordshire in 1333 and was named as a tax assessor for the same county, and also for Buckinghamshire, in 1340. He was a member of the Royal Household from the 1320s onwards. He was Treasurer to the Prince of Wales, and gained great experience in the field of finance, especially army accounts.

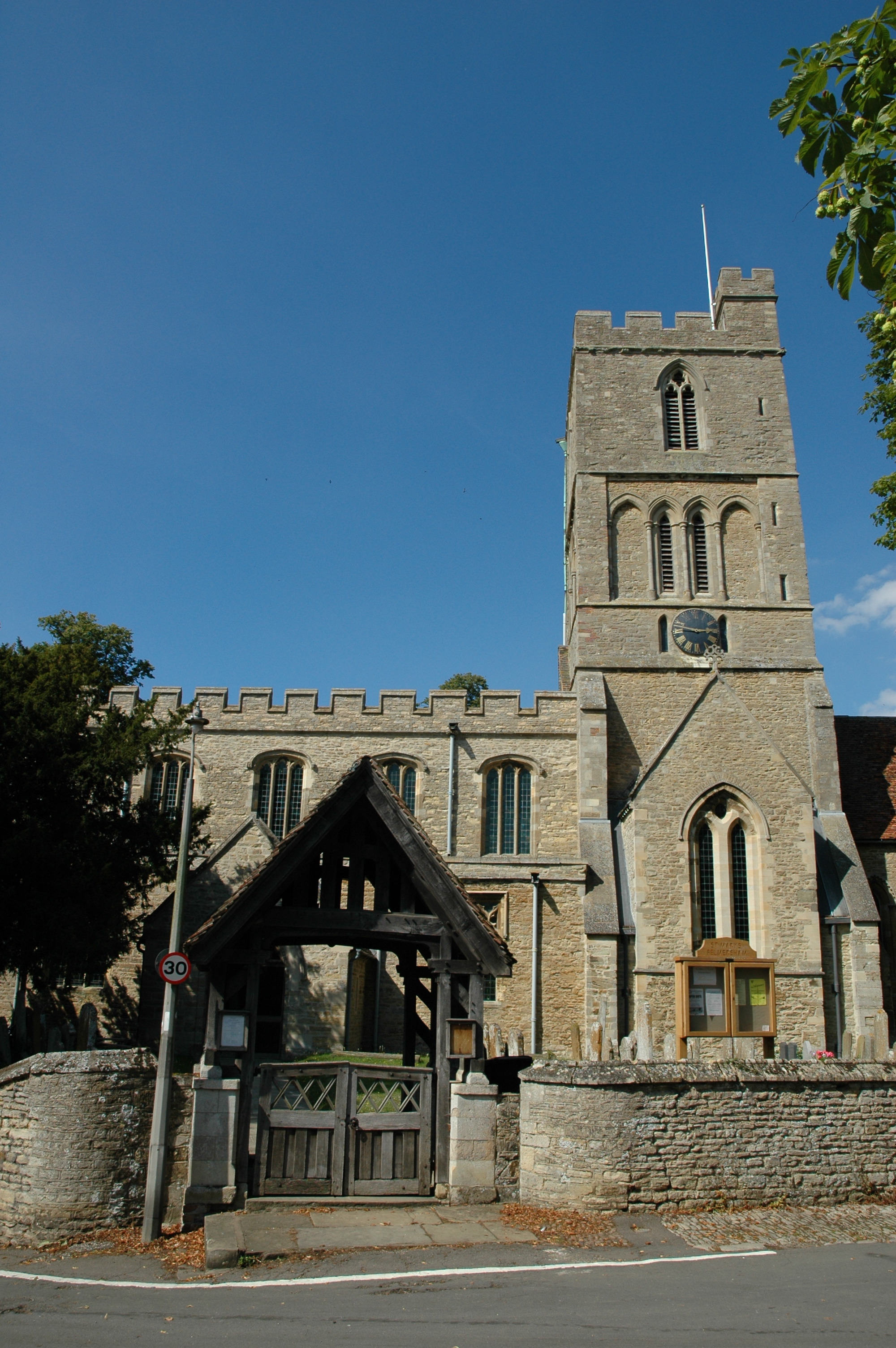
Church of St Mary, Felmersham, Bedfordshire: Burnham was the parish priest here in the 1330s.

== Lord Treasurer of Ireland ==
In 1343 he was sent to Ireland as Lord Treasurer; he also became a canon of St. Patrick's Cathedral, Dublin and a prebendary of the Diocese of Cloyne. His appointment as Treasurer, like that of Sir Ralph d'Ufford as Justiciar of Ireland the following year, was apparently prompted by complaints by the Privy Council of Ireland about the efficiency of the Irish Exchequer, and the Council's doubts about the honesty of Burnham's predecessor Hugh de Burgh. It was no doubt thought that Burnham, with his long experience of administering the English royal finances, would be a good Treasurer, and he did indeed do something to improve the Irish finances. However, his long battle to clear himself of charges of corruption can hardly have made the task of reforming the Irish Exchequer any easier. He was ex officio a member of the Privy Council. In 1344 he received £40 for levying the King's expenses in Munster. He returned to England on official business in 1345. In 1346 he was present at the Council meeting which approved the appointment of Ralph Darcy as the new Justiciar of Ireland (d'Ufford had died in April.)

When the lands of Maurice FitzGerald, 1st Earl of Desmond, were forfeited for rebellion in 1345, Burnham was chosen to administer them. The lands were restored to Desmond in 1349. Burnham, like d'Ufford, was accused of unduly heavy-handed treatment of the Anglo-Irish nobility.

In 134d he was raised to the Bench as a Baron of the Court of Exchequer (Ireland).

== Charges of corruption ==
In 1348 he was summoned to England to answer very serious charges over his conduct as Treasurer, involving accusations of fraud, negligence and concealment of the royal revenues for his own profit. His stay in England lasted for seven years, requiring him to appoint attorneys to manage his Irish affairs. The charges appear to have been instigated by William de Barton, a disgruntled official who was the former Keeper of Works in the Exchequer of Ireland who had a personal grudge against Burnham, who was probably responsible for Barton's temporary removal from office on health grounds. Barton belonged to a rival faction in the Dublin administration and played a large part in the subsequent inquiry; he also received a substantial grant of Crown lands at this time at Milltown, Dublin. There is no evidence that Burnham was regarded by the rest of his colleagues as corrupt, although some of them stood to gain from the charges, notably Robert de Emeldon, who succeeded him as Treasurer, and was supportive of Barton, whose return to the Exchequer he facilitated.

In the end, Burnham was cleared of any wrongdoing; it does not seem that he had ever been removed from the Court of Exchequer. While the accusations against him were numerous and detailed, Connolly concludes that there is no credible evidence to support any of them and that the charges were fabricated by Burnham's rival William de Barton. Although Barton, given the lack of evidence to support them, could not hope to prove the charges, he could hope that the length and complexity of the inquiry, which he dragged out as far as possible, would cause Burnham a great deal of trouble, and keep him out of Ireland.

== Last years ==
Having vindicated his good name, Burnham returned to Ireland and was promoted to the office of Lord Chief Baron in 1355. He remained in office until his death in 1363. He and his former enemy William de Barton, who had been restored to office, on Robert de Emeldon's recommendation, as Chief Engrosser (copier) of the Exchequer, and as Chief Purveyor, appear to have resolved their differences, and they worked amicably together in the Court of Exchequer for several years. In 1361 with several other officials he crossed to England in an effort to persuade King Edward III that his presence, or failing that the presence of a senior member of the Royal Family, was required in Ireland to strengthen the Crown's authority. He also played a part in drawing up the Westminster Ordinances which reformed the Irish Exchequer.
