= Bruno Talbot =

17th c Jacobite and Chancellor of the Exchequer-IRE

Bruno Talbot (1650 – aft 1690) was an English Jacobite who was Chancellor of the Exchequer of Ireland during the Glorious Revolution and Williamite War in Ireland.

== Biography ==
Talbot was a son of John Talbot, 10th Earl of Shrewsbury by his second wife Hon. Frances Arundell, daughter of Thomas Arundell, 1st Baron Arundell of Wardour. He was born in Wardour in 1650 and raised as a Roman Catholic.

In 1687 he was appointed Chancellor of the Exchequer of Ireland by James II of England, replacing the Protestant Sir Charles Meredyth. He remained loyal to James II during the Glorious Revolution the following year and served the Jacobite cause in Ireland during the king's attempt to regain the throne. Talbot was replaced as Chancellor by Meredyth in 1690 following the defeat of the Jacobites at the Battle of the Boyne. He fled Ireland, likely travelling to France, and died in obscurity.

Political offices
Preceded by Sir Charles Meredyth	Chancellor of the Exchequer of Ireland; 1687–1690	Succeeded by Sir Charles Meredyth
