= Oliver Plunkett, 1st Baron Louth =

Irish peer

Oliver Plunkett, 1st Baron Louth (d. c. 1555), was an Irish peer.

He was the eldest son of Sir Richard (or: Patrick, Lodge vol. 6, p. 161) Plunkett of Beaulieu (died 1508), High Sheriff of Louth, and his wife Catherine Nangle, daughter of Thomas Nangle, 15th Baron of Navan. He married firstly Catherine, daughter of John Rochfort of Carrick, County Kildare and Genet Dexter, and had at least nine children. He married secondly Maud Bathe, daughter of Walter Bathe of Rathfeigh, and widow of Walter Golding of Piercetown Landy, and had six further children. After his death, Maud remarried Richard Bellew.

Plunkett was raised to the Peerage of Ireland as Baron Louth in 1541, one of six new peerages created at the time: among the others were Baron Dunboyne, and Baron Upper Ossory. This was part of a calculated policy of King Henry VIII, on the advice of the Lord Deputy of Ireland, Sir Anthony St Leger, that the loyalty of the Anglo-Irish nobility could be better secured by "small gifts and honest persuasion rather than rigor". The policy was successful, at least as regards the Plunketts, who were noted in later generations for their loyalty to the English Crown.

He died circa 1555 and was succeeded in the barony by his eldest son Thomas.

Peerage of Ireland
New creation	Baron Louth; 1541–c. 1555	Succeeded by Thomas Plunkett
