= John de Braideston =

John de Braideston (died after 1334) was an English Crown official who also served as a judge in Ireland.

His name suggests that he was born in Braydeston, a deserted medieval village close to Brundall, Norfolk: the Church of St Michael and All Angels, Braydeston still survives. He is first heard of in Kent in 1323, when he was in business as a corn merchant. In 1327 he was steward to Walter Reynolds, Archbishop of Canterbury, and the following year he sat on a commission of oyer and terminer in Surrey, suggesting that he was a qualified lawyer (in Ireland at least this was not at the time a requirement to be a Baron of the Court of Exchequer).

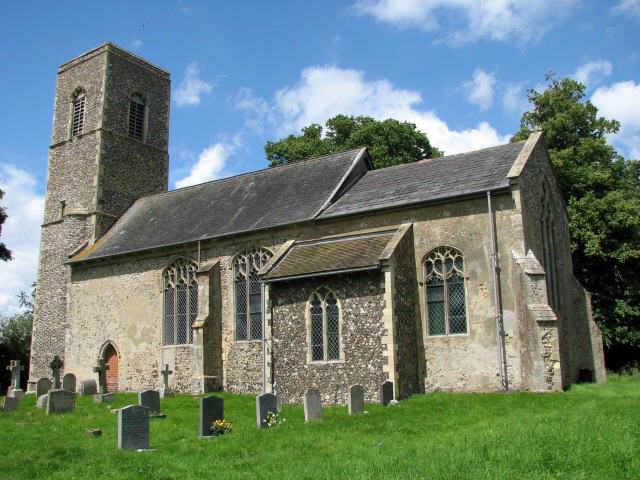
Church of St Michael and All Angels, Braydeston. John was probably born in Braydeston, which is now deserted.

He was sent to Ireland as Chief Baron of the Irish Exchequer in 1329 and served in that office for two years. In 1330 John de Mohun appointed Braideston and his colleague John de Grauntsete as his attorneys. Braideston returned to England shortly after, and was still living in 1334.
