= Alexander de Balscot =

Irish cleric and statesman

Alexander de Balscot, also known as Alexander Petit (died 1400) was one of the leading Irish clerics and statesmen of the late fourteenth century, who held the offices of Bishop of Ossory, Bishop of Meath, Treasurer of Ireland and Lord Chancellor of Ireland.

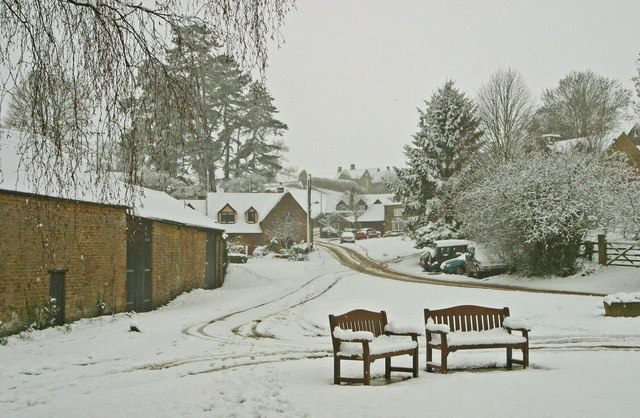
Balscote village in the snow

== Family ==
He was born at Balscote in Oxfordshire; Nicholas de Balscote, Chief Baron of the Irish Exchequer 1313-1319, was probably his cousin, though of an earlier generation. John Balscot, Deputy to the Lord Treasurer of Ireland in 1354, and Ralph Balscote, a clerk in the royal service, may also have been relatives.

== Bishop ==
Alexander is first heard of in Ireland in 1358; he became vicar of Dungarvan in 1359, Bishop of Ossory in 1371 and Bishop of Meath in 1386. He was criticised for spending large sums of money to influence his election to the See of Ossory, and for visiting the Holy See without permission, but received a royal pardon to cover any possible wrongdoing.

== Statesman ==
He was appointed Treasurer of Ireland in 1372 and again in 1376-7; he acted as Justiciar of Ireland in 1379, but was not appointed to the office permanently, due to ill health. In 1377 he and John Brettan, Baron of the Court of Exchequer (Ireland) were much occupied on the King's business in Munster, although the Council refused their subsequent request to cross to England to put the matter before King Edward III and the English Council. In 1378 he petitioned the Crown that the warrant appointing John Warner as High Sheriff of County Cork and that he not intermeddle in the office. Richard II appointed him Lord Chancellor in 1386. He was a key member of the Irish government of the pre-eminent royal favourite, Robert de Vere, Duke of Ireland. Following de Vere's downfall at the Battle of Radcot Bridge in 1388, de Balscot was dismissed from office, along with most of his colleagues, including John Stanley, the Lord Lieutenant of Ireland, James Butler, 3rd Earl of Ormond, the Governor, and Sir Robert Crull, the Lord High Treasurer of Ireland. Later that year, King Richard II reappointed all of them to their old positions.

De Balscot later also acted as Chancellor and Justiciar at intervals until his death in 1400. In 1395 the King relieved him of his duties as Chancellor on account of old age. In 1399 he delivered a lengthy and pessimistic address on the condition of Ireland to the King: "no soldiers for the defence of this realm and no money to pay for them... the King hath no profit from this realm.. The Irish enemies are strong and arrogant and of great power...The English rebels are allies of the Irish enemies".

== Last years ==
He died at his official residence at Ardbraccan, County Meath, and was buried in Trim at St. Mary's Abbey, Trim. His policy was to buy off the Gaelic clans of the Pale. He was a strong supporter of the Anglo-Irish magnates and opposed to the appointment of Englishmen to Irish offices. He repeatedly but unsuccessfully urged the Crown to provide more support for the Irish.

== Reputation ==
Elrington Ball describes him as a man of great wisdom and learning. He was out of favour for part of his career, but he was always restored to a position of influence, as his advice was considered indispensable. O'Flanagan similarly refers to his extraordinary reputation for wisdom and learning.
