= Walter de Kenley =

Walter de Kenley, or de Kenleye, (died 1308) was an Irish Crown servant, statesman, judge and military commander. He was one of the first Crown servants to hold the office of Chancellor of the Exchequer of Ireland.

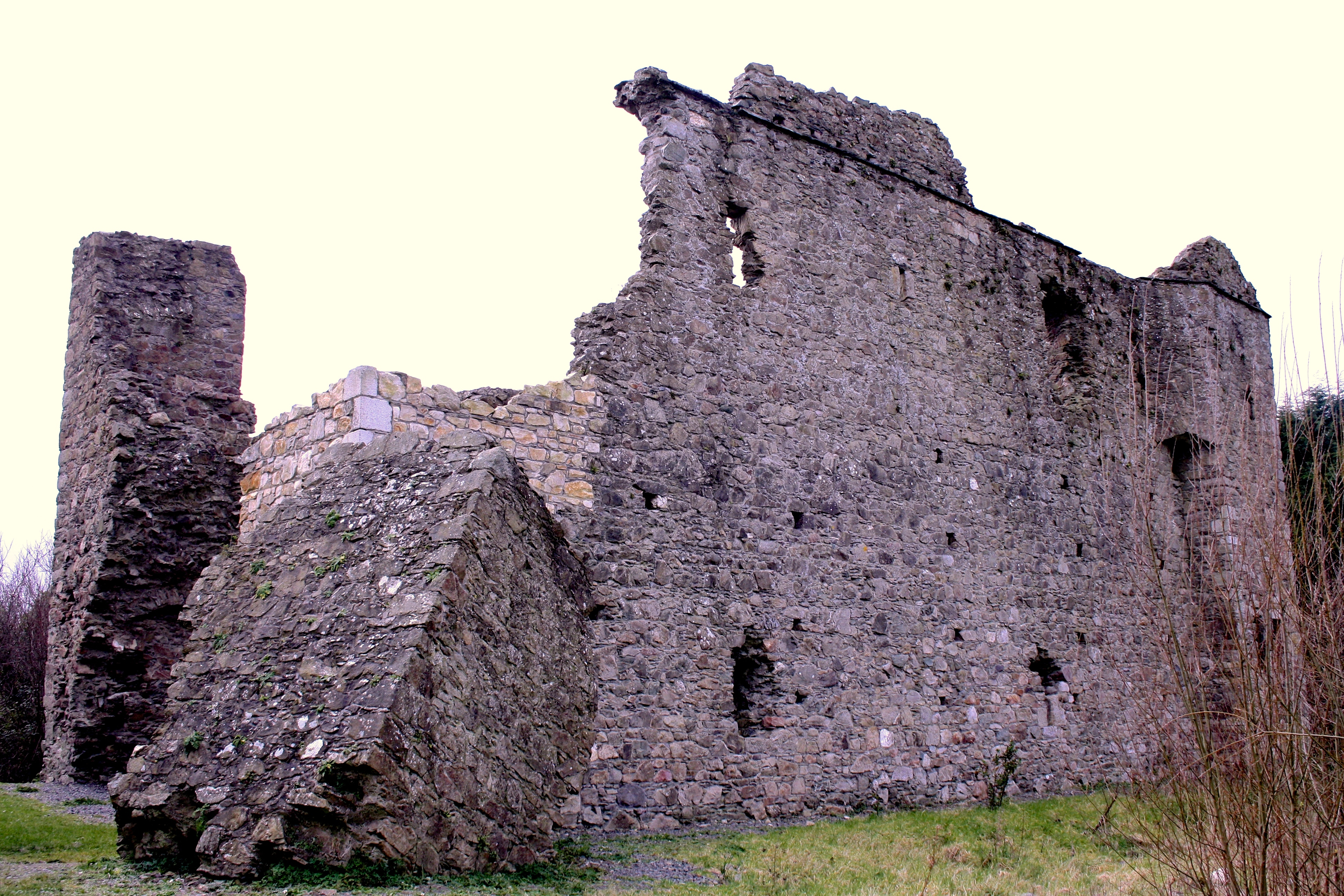
Kindlestown Castle, County Wicklow, home of Walter's uncle Albert de Kenley.

He was born in County Kildare, nephew of Albert de Kenley of Kindlestown Castle, County Wicklow, High Sheriff of Kildare in 1301, and like his nephew an official of the Exchequer of Ireland, as was Albert's uncle, Master John de Kenley.

Walter was a leading military commander who gave good service against the Gaelic clans at Glendalough in the Wicklow Mountains in 1302. He was knighted in 1303. He became Chancellor of the Exchequer in 1292 and a judge of the Court of Common Pleas (Ireland) in 1305. He died in 1308.
