= Adam de Harvington =

14C Crown official and judge

Adam de Harvington, also called Adam de Herwynton (c.1270 – c.1345) was a fourteenth-century Crown official and judge who had a successful career in both England and Ireland. He held office as Chief Baron of the Irish Exchequer and Lord Treasurer of Ireland, and as Chancellor of the Exchequer of England, and acquired considerable wealth.

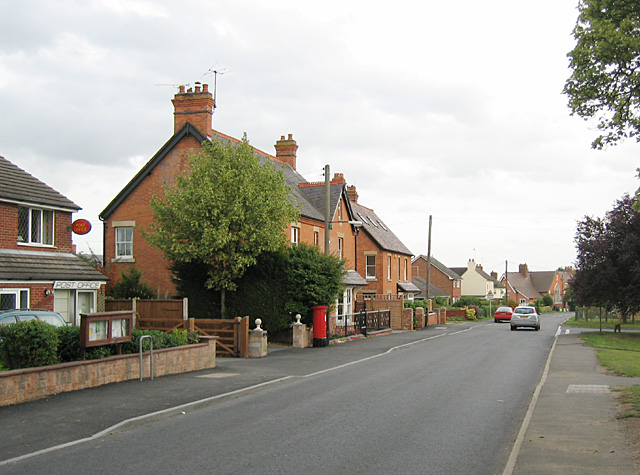
Harvington, Worcestershire, Adam's birthplace, present day

== Family ==
He derived his name from his birthplace, Harvington, Chaddesley Corbett, Worcestershire; he was the son of William de Harvington or de Herwynton. He probably held Harvington Hall itself as a tenant of the Earl of Warwick, and is said to have died there. He had a lifelong association with Pershore Abbey. William de Harvington, Abbot of Pershore 1307-40, was his cousin, and Adam in a lawsuit of 1419 was described as William's heir. De Herwynton seems to have been the most usual contemporary spelling of the name.

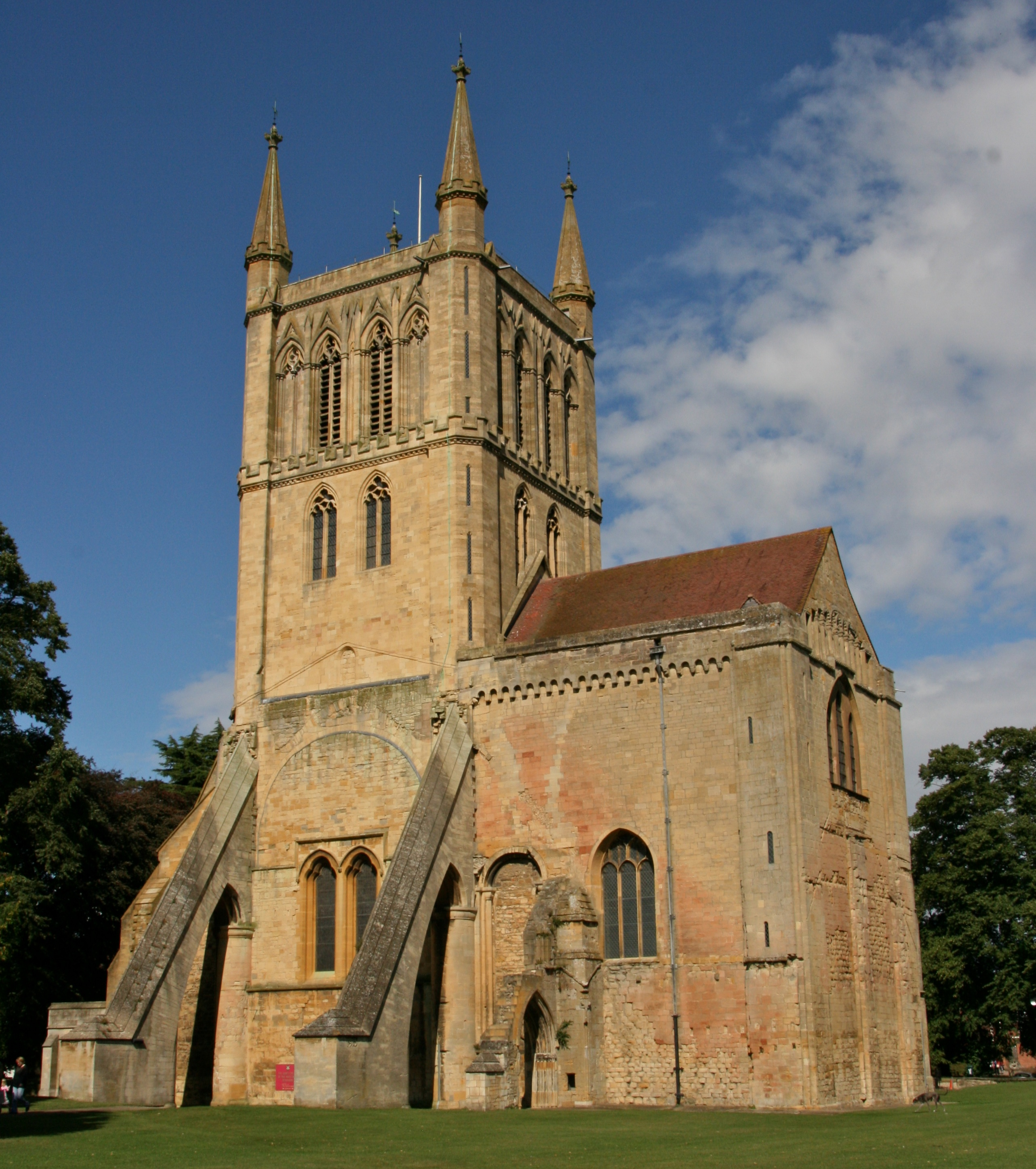
Pershore Abbey, of which Adam, whose cousin was the Abbot, was a notable benefactor

== Career ==
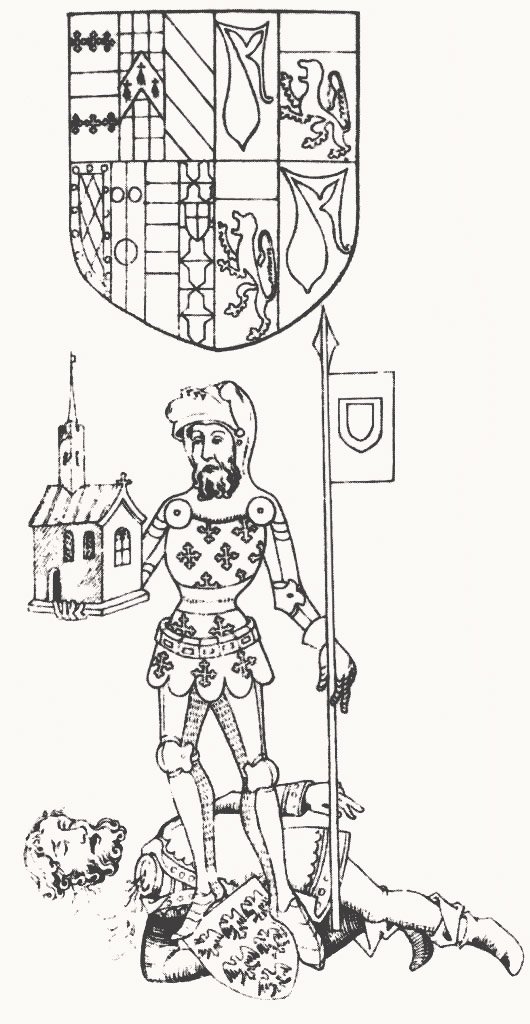
Adam's patron Guy de Beauchamp, Earl of Warwick: he is depicted standing over the body of his enemy Piers Gaveston

His path to high office lay through the patronage of Guy de Beauchamp, 10th Earl of Warwick (died 1315). It was probably Warwick who obtained for him the position of Deputy Chamberlain of the Exchequer in 1298 and persuaded Edward I to grant him the manor of Talton, Worcestershire, in 1303. Adam probably held Harvington Hall as the tenant of Warwick, since after his death it reverted to Warwick's heirs. Adam was given the living of Awre, Gloucestershire in 1305 and of Hanslope, Buckinghamshire, in 1316; he was presented to the latter benefice by Warwick's widow, Countess Alice. He was an executor of Warwick's will in 1315 and was given a lease of certain of his lands for fifteen years. In his own will, he made clear his great sense of obligation to the Earl.

His association with the Diocese of Worcester had begun by 1305 when he accompanied the Bishop of Worcester, William Gainsborough, on a journey overseas; in the 1320s he is found regularly acting as Vicar-general of the Diocese of Worcester.

He also acted on occasion for the powerful Mortimer family. In 1304 Margaret de Fiennes, widow of Edmund Mortimer, 2nd Baron Mortimer, authorised him to act as her attorney, together with Walter de Thornbury (later Lord Chancellor of Ireland), who was executor of her husband's will: they were required to recover her dowry and the properties which had belonged to her late husband Edmund.

== In Ireland ==
After Warwick's death, Adam acquired a new patron: this was Edward I's nephew, Thomas, 2nd Earl of Lancaster. Adam became Keeper of the Rolls of the Bench at Westminster in 1314 and was a Commissioner of oyer and terminer 1314–1322. Any setback he may have suffered in his career after Lancaster's downfall and execution for treason in 1322 was temporary: he seems to have been regarded as a valued and hard-working Crown official. He was sent to Ireland as Chief Baron in 1324, and was briefly Chancellor of the Exchequer of Ireland and Lord High Treasurer of Ireland in 1325–26, after the temporary downfall of Walter de Islip. Walter, who faced charges of fraud and corruption, was sentenced to forfeiture of his goods and chattels (he later received a royal pardon). Adam was one of the officials entrusted with the custody of the property in question and was required to account strictly for it. He returned to England as Chancellor of the Exchequer in 1327.

== Last years ==
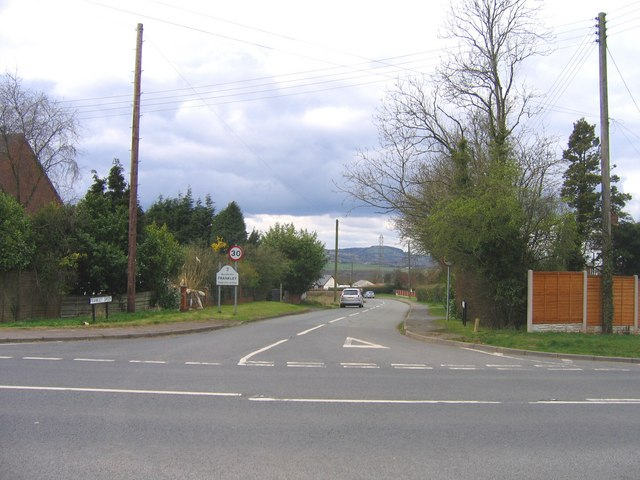
Frankley, Worcestershire, present-day; Adam held the manor of Frankley

He retired to his native Worcestershire in 1330. His main estates in that shire were Harvington Hall and Frankley. In his last years, he was a noted benefactor of Pershore Abbey. Ball gives his date of death as 1337, but this is certainly too early. He was later described as the heir of his cousin Abbot Walter, who died in 1340, and he made a conveyance of land in 1342; he was dead by 1346. Walter left him two manors in Worcestershire, one of which appears to correspond roughly with present-day Sodington Hall. In his will he left money to Pershore Abbey to erect a chantry to pray for his soul and for the soul of his first patron Guy, Earl of Warwick. He was also a benefactor of Halesowen Abbey in Shropshire.

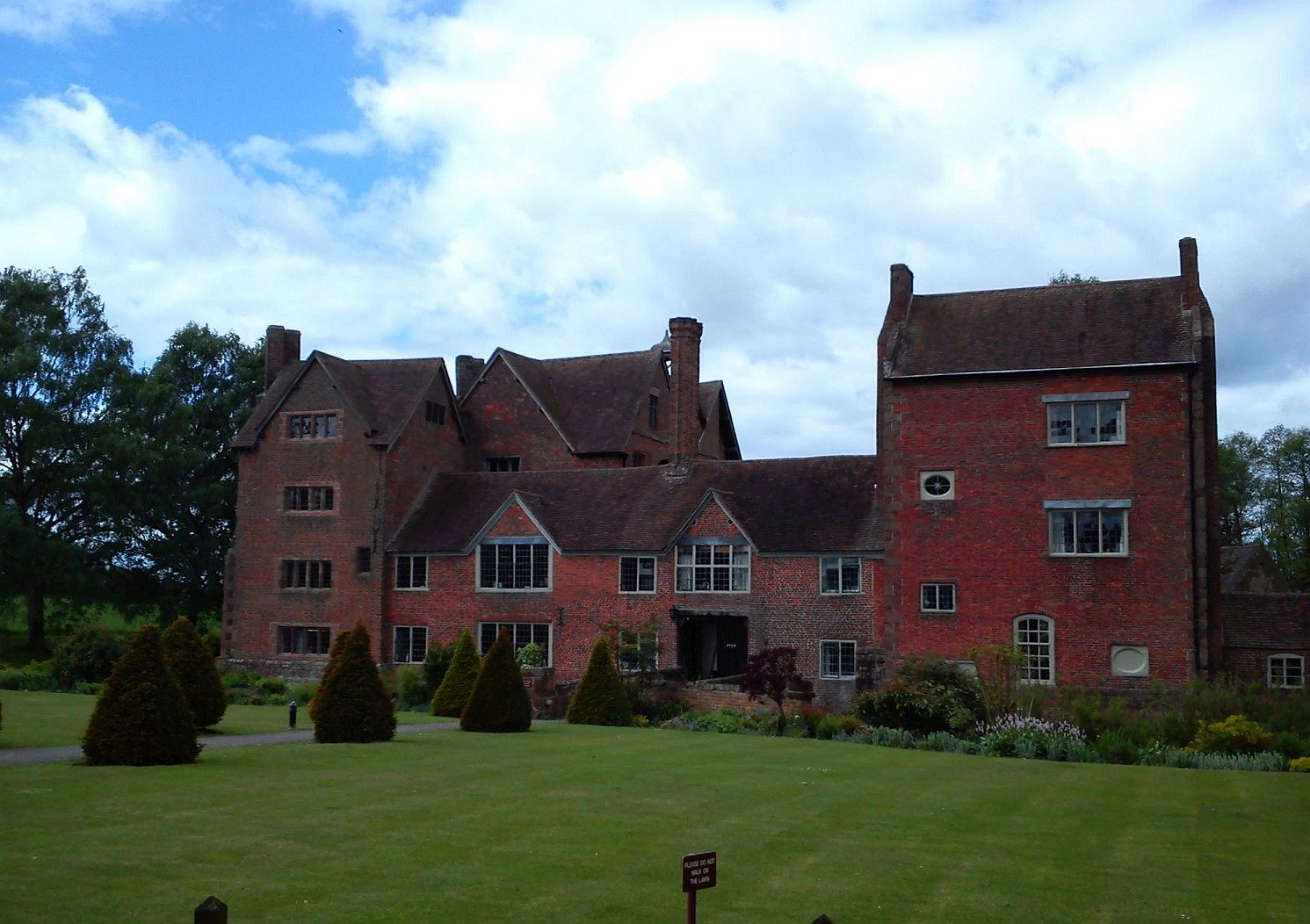
Harvington Hall
