= Chancellor of the Exchequer of Ireland =

Head of the Exchequer of Ireland

The Chancellor of the Exchequer of Ireland was the head of the Exchequer of Ireland and a member of the Dublin Castle administration under the Lord Lieutenant of Ireland in the Kingdom of Ireland. In early times the office was sometimes called the Chancellor of the Green Wax. In the early centuries, the Chancellor was often a highly educated cleric with knowledge of Finance. In later centuries, when sessions of Parliament had become regular, the Chancellor was invariably an MP in the Irish House of Commons. Walter de Kenley (died 1308), Chancellor from 1292 until his death, was both a judge of the Court of Common Pleas (Ireland) and a distinguished military commander who gave good service against the Gaelic clans of County Wicklow.

The office was separate from the judicial role of Lord Chief Baron of the Exchequer of Ireland, although in the early centuries, the two offices were often held by the same person; on other occasions, the Chancellor was second Baron of the Exchequer. The first Chancellor appears to have been Thomas de Chaddesworth, Dean of St Patrick's Cathedral, in 1270. Like de Kenley, he was a judge of the Court of Common Pleas (Ireland), not the Court of Exchequer.

Although the Kingdom of Ireland merged with the Kingdom of Great Britain in 1801 under the Acts of Union 1800 to form the United Kingdom of Great Britain and Ireland, the Exchequer of Ireland did not merge with the Exchequer of Great Britain until 1817. The last separate Chancellor of the Exchequer of Ireland was William Vesey-FitzGerald.

== List of chancellors ==
- 1270 Thomas de Chaddesworth
- 1292 Walter de Kenley, or Kenleye
- 1308 Walter de Thornbury
- 1309 William de Clere (died before taking up office). Brother of Nicholas de Clere, Lord Treasurer of Ireland.
- 1309–1310: John de Hotham
- 1310 Nicholas de Balscote
- 1326 Adam de Harvington (or Herwynton)
- 1328 Thomas de Montpellier
- 1330 Henry de Thrapston
- 1333 Thomas de Brayles
- 1334 Robert le Poer
- 1344 William de Bromley
- 1346 Robert de Emeldon
- 1350 John de Pembroke
- 1374 John de Karlell
- 1376 Thomas Bache
- 1385 William FitzWilliam
- 1388 John de Troye
- 1391 Robert Preston, 1st Baron Gormanston
- Robert de Herford (temp. Richard II)
- 1399: Hugh Banent, or Bavent, also Clerk of the Crown and Hanaper
- c.1419-23: Robert Dyke, first term
- 1424: Sampson d'Artois
- c.1425-30 Robert Dyke, second term
- 1431: John Blaketoun
- 1436: Robert Cowdrey
- 1446: John Hardwick
- 1461: Robert Norreys
- 1478 Robert St Lawrence, 3rd Baron Howth
- 1487 Walter Ivers
- 1495: Edward Barnewall
- 1521 Patrick Bermingham
- 1532: Richard Delahide
- 1535: John Alan
- 1536: Thomas Cusack
- 1561:Henry Draycott
- 1572: Robert Dillon
- 1577: John Bathe
- 1586–1589: Sir Edward Waterhouse
- 1589: Sir George Clive
- 1590: Thomas Molyneux
- 1596: Sir Richard Cooke
- 1612: Sir Dudley Norton
- 1616: Henry Holcroft
- 27 October 1617: Thomas Hibbotts
  - Henry Holcroft (in reversion after Hibbotts)
- 1634: Sir Robert Meredyth
- 1668: Richard Jones
- 1674: Sir Charles Meredyth
- 1687: Bruno Talbot (Jacobite)
- 1690: Sir Charles Meredyth
- 1695: Philip Savage
- 1717: Sir Ralph Gore, 4th Baronet
- 1733: Henry Boyle
- 1735: Marmaduke Coghill
- 1739: Henry Boyle
- 1754: Arthur Hill
- 1755: Henry Boyle
- 1757: Anthony Malone
- 1761: Sir William Yorke, 1st Baronet
- 1763: William Gerard Hamilton
- 1782: George Ponsonby
- 23 April 1784: John Foster
- 17 September 1785: Sir John Parnell, 2nd Baronet
- 27 January 1799: Isaac Corry
- 9 July 1804: John Foster
- 24 February 1806: Sir John Newport, 1st Baronet
- 30 April 1807: John Foster
- 1811: William Wellesley-Pole
- 11 August 1812: William Vesey-FitzGerald
- 1816: Nicholas Vansittart (Chancellor of the Exchequer of Great Britain from 1812)
- Irish Exchequer abolished 1817
