= Robert le Poer =

Irish judge and Crown official

Robert le Poer (died c. 1346) was an Irish judge and Crown official who held the offices of Lord High Treasurer of Ireland and Chief Baron of the Irish Exchequer.

== Family ==
Francis Elrington Ball, in his definitive study of the pre-1921 Irish judiciary, says nothing of Robert's ancestry. Other sources state that he was a younger son of Arnold le Poer, Seneschal of Kilkenny (died 1328). Arnold was one of the commanders of the army of Edward II which defeated the invasion of Ireland by Edward Bruce, the younger brother of Robert the Bruce. He became a figure of considerable power in his native county, but his career was destroyed by the Kilkenny witchcraft trials. Arnold's support for the alleged leader of the local coven of witches, his relative Alice Kyteler, gained him the enmity of Richard de Ledrede, Bishop of Ossory, who was the prime mover behind the trials. Arnold made what was in hindsight the serious mistake of having the bishop arrested and imprisoned. The bishop quickly secured his release, and Arnold in his turn was arrested on charges of heresy. He died in Dublin Castle in 1328 while awaiting trial.

There seems no reason to doubt this account of Robert's parentage, although it may seem surprising that if he was Arnold's son, his career was not damaged by Arnold's downfall – indeed Arnold's arrest coincided roughly with Robert's appointment as Treasurer. Possibly his appointment marked a decline in the influence of Ledrede, who was English by birth and bitterly unpopular with most of the Anglo-Irish aristocracy, and even with his clerical colleagues, including the Archbishop of Dublin, Alexander de Bicknor.

== Early career ==
Robert, as a young man, was in the service of John Hastings, 1st Baron Hastings and went with him to Gascony in 1307. The connection with the Hastings family continued, and by 1322 he was their bailiff in Ireland. He became parish priest of Lutterworth, Leicestershire, in 1318, and of Adderley, Shropshire, the following year. In the 1320s he also had a living in County Carlow.

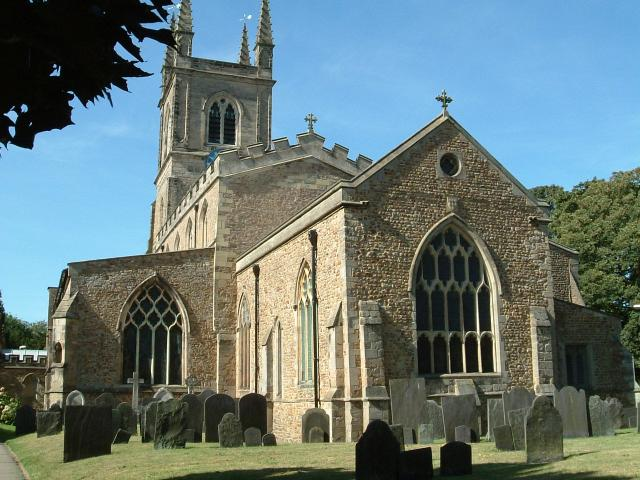
St Mary's Church, Lutterworth; le Poer was parish priest here from 1318.

His first Crown office was as Chamberlain of North Wales in 1323; in 1327 he became Lord High Treasurer of Ireland, with a salary of £40 a year.

== Judge ==
In 1331 he was appointed Chief Baron of the Irish Exchequer and at the same time held the office of Chancellor of the Exchequer of Ireland. In 1335 he was superseded as Chief Baron, but remained an ordinary Baron of the Exchequer. In 1338 he served briefly as a judge of the Court of Common Pleas (Ireland); the following year he was reappointed Chief Baron and remained in that office until 1344. In 1342 and 1344 he received extra payments from the Crown for his good services, and in particular for his several journeys to County Meath as Chancellor. He was still alive in January 1346 when he petitioned the Privy Council for the arrears of his salary to be paid.
