= Thomas atte Crosse =

Thomas atte Crosse, also called Thomas de Crosse, or simply Thomas Crosse (died after 1348) was an English cleric, Crown official and judge, who had a highly successful career in both England and Ireland. Little is recorded about his early years, but by 1336 he was referred to as an official of long-standing, who had been put to great "labours and charges" on the King's business in England, Ireland and Scotland.

He appears as a prebendary in St Patrick's Cathedral, Dublin in 1334, and in the same year was made a Baron of the Court of Exchequer (Ireland). He was made Chief Baron of the Irish Exchequer in 1335, "so long as he was of good behaviour" and held that office for two years.

In 1336, "in consideration of his long and good service" to the Crown, he was appointed Keeper of the Royal Market in Ireland, and Royal Clerk of the Wages. The Irish Exchequer Payments state that he was assigned the task of paying the wages of the men at arms being sent to Scotland with the Justiciar of Ireland "to suppress the malice of the King's Scottish enemies" in 1335-6, and with purveying the necessary food and drink for the Scottish campaign. For this purpose, he was paid £400. He was also paid 100 marks for repairs to military engines, crossbows and other instruments.

He returned to England in 1337: Ball states that he received many clerical benefices but does not specify them. He was probably the Thomas atte Crosse who was rector of Bexwell, Norfolk. He was appointed Keeper of the Royal Wardrobe ( i.e. the Royal Household) in 1337 and was Chamberlain of the Exchequer from 1337 to 1348.

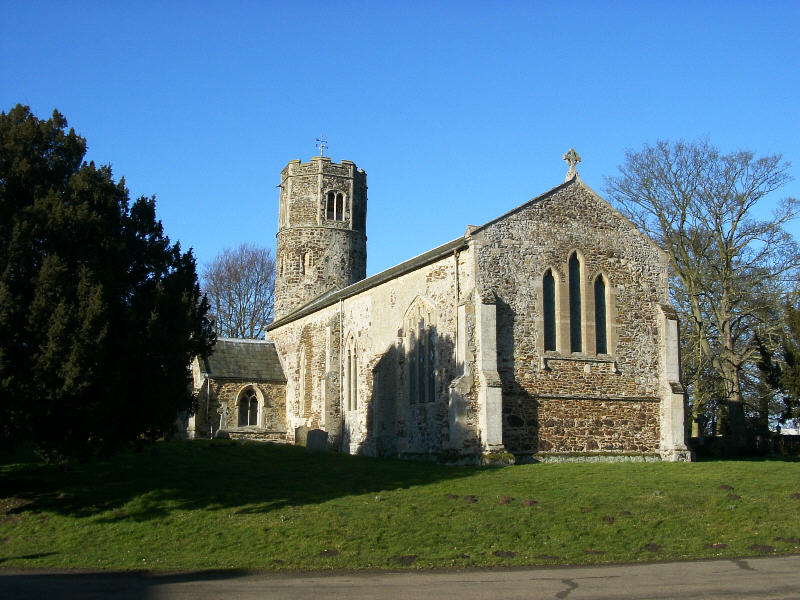
Bexwell
