= John Wyse =

John Wyse (died after 1499) was an Irish judge who held office as Chief Baron of the Irish Exchequer.

He was born in Waterford. He was a member of the long-established Wyse family of St John's Manor, who settled in the city shortly after the Norman conquest of Ireland. He was the son of Maurice Wyse, who served twice as Mayor of Waterford, and from whom he inherited substantial estates sometime after 1495. He married a daughter of Henry Sherlock, and was the father of Sir William Wyse (died 1557), a prominent Irish statesman in the reign of Henry VIII who enjoyed the King's personal regard. Like his grandfather Maurice, Sir William served as Mayor of Waterford. John's best-known descendant was Sir Thomas Wyse (1791-1862), the politician, diplomat and nephew by marriage of Napoleon.

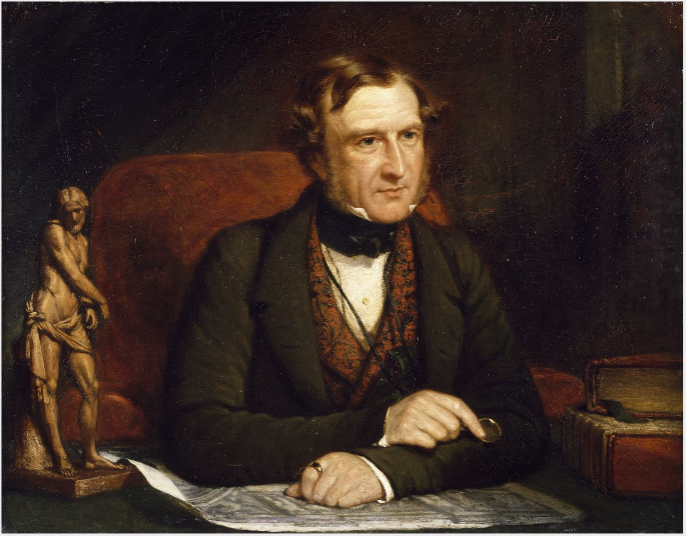
Sir Thomas Wyse, a descendant of the Chief Baron

In 1482 he received a special licence to leave Ireland to study law at the Inns of Court in London, as Ireland had no law school at the time, and it was necessary for Irish lawyers who hoped to achieve judicial office to receive their legal training in this way. He entered Lincoln's Inn, as most Irish law students did. He was Chief Baron from 1492 to 1494, and was by statute appointed special justice for the counties of Waterford and Kilkenny in 1493, and again in 1499. He was replaced by the English-born Walter Ivers, as part of a general purge of Irish judges in 1494: many of them, though not as far as is known Wyse himself, were suspected of disloyalty to the Tudor dynasty, and in particular of supporting the pretender to the Crown, Perkin Warbeck.

Our most personal glimpse of him is in 1495, when he was sent on a diplomatic mission to Munster to negotiate with Maurice FitzGerald, 9th Earl of Desmond, but was taken unawares by the invasion of Perkin Warbeck, who with Desmond's support besieged Waterford. Wyse was forced to flee; he subsequently put in a claim to the Treasury for the loss of two horses and received compensation.
