= William de Chambre (Irish priest) =

Irish priest

William de Chambre was an Irish priest in the fourteenth century. He was Archdeacon of Dublin then Lord High Treasurer of Ireland and finally Dean of St Patrick's Cathedral, Dublin.
