= Walter Ivers =

English-born Crown official and judge

Walter Ivers, Evers or Yvers (died after 1496) was an English-born Crown official and judge in late fifteenth-century Ireland. For a few years in the 1490s, he was a key ally of Sir Edward Poynings, Lord Deputy of Ireland 1494–6.

Little is known of his background. According to the Dictionary of National Biography, he was of English birth, and this is probably correct since Poynings' programme for reforming the Irish political system, which led to Ivers' elevation to the office of Chief Baron of the Exchequer, called for the appointment of English judges to serve as Lord Chancellor of Ireland, and to preside in the Courts of common law.

He is first heard of in Dublin in about 1485, when he was practising as a lawyer, and also acting as an arbitrator (an early use of the term). He was clearly a man with some expertise in the world of finance, who served as Chancellor of the Exchequer of Ireland from 1487 to 1494.

Sir Edward Poynings is best remembered for Poynings' Law, or the Statute of Drogheda, which effectively removed the power of the Irish Parliament to legislate independently. However this was only one part of an ambitious programme of political reform, which included curbing the power of the leading Anglo-Irish magnate Gerald FitzGerald, 8th Earl of Kildare. This entailed the wholesale removal of the Irish judges, who were regarded as his tools ("following Kildare like sheep" in Ball's phrase), and their replacement by English judges of proven loyalty to the Tudor dynasty. Ivers was appointed Chief Baron of the Irish Exchequer in 1494, replacing the Waterford-born John Wyse, and according to Gilbert, he was a close associate of Poynings. He was superseded in 1496, following Poynings' recall to England and Kildare's restoration to royal favour. Little is known of his later years.

== Sources ==
- Ball, F. Elrington The Judges in Ireland 1221-1921 London John Murray 1926
- Gilbert, J. T. History of the Viceroys of Ireland Dublin J. Duffy 1865
- Pollard, Alfred Frederick (1896). "Poynings, Edward" . In Lee, Sidney (ed.). Dictionary of National Biography. Vol. 46. London: Smith, Elder & Co. p. 271-274.
