= Thomas Corrigan (priest) =

Thomas George Corrigan (1928–2011) was an Irish Anglican priest.

He was educated at Trinity College, Dublin and the Church of Ireland Theological College; and ordained in 1959. After a curacy at Cavan he held incumbencies in Drung, Belfast and Enniskeen. He died on 5 September 2011.
