= Chief Baron of the Irish Exchequer =

Senior judge who oversaw the Court of Exchequer in Ireland

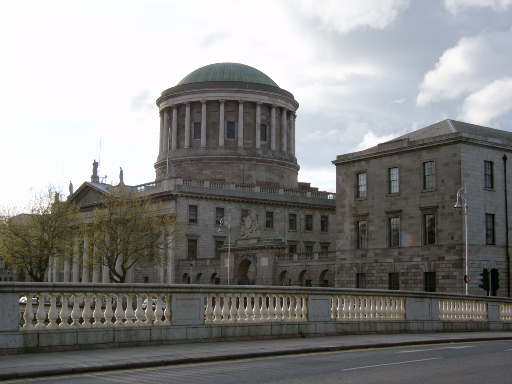
The Four Courts in Dublin.

The chief baron of the Irish Exchequer was the baron (judge) who presided over the Court of Exchequer. This was a mirror of the equivalent court in England, and was one of the four courts which sat in the building in Dublin which is still called the Four Courts.

The title chief baron was first used in 1309 by Walter de Islip. In the early centuries of its existence, it was a political as well as a judicial office, and as late as 1442 the lord treasurer of Ireland thought it necessary to recommend that the chief baron should always be a properly trained lawyer (which Michael Gryffin, the chief baron at the time, was not). There are two cryptic references in the Patent Rolls, for 1386 and 1390, to the Liberty of Ulster having its own chief baron.

The last chief baron, Christopher Palles, continued to hold the title after the court was merged into a new High Court of Justice in Ireland in 1878, until his retirement in 1916, when the office lapsed.

== Chief barons of the Irish Exchequer ==
- Walter de Islip 1309
- William de Meones 1311
- Nicholas de Balscote 1313
- Richard le Brun 1319
- Adam de Harvington (or Herwynton) 1324
- Thomas de Montpellier 1327
- Roger de Birthorpe 1327
- John de Braideston 1329
- William de Tickhill 1331
- Robert le Poer, first term 1331
- Thomas atte Crosse 1335
- Hugh de Burgh, first term 1337
- Robert le Poer, second term 1339
- Hugh de Burgh, second term 1344
- Robert de Emeldon 1351
- John de Burnham 1355
- Robert de Holywood, first term 1363
- John Keppock 1364
- Robert de Holywood, second term 1367
- Stephen Bray first term 1376
- Henry Mitchell 1376
- Stephen Bray, second term 1377
- Thomas Bache, first term 1382
- William de Karlell 1383
- Thomas Bache, second term 1384
- William Skrene 1395
- William Tynbegh, first term 1397
- Richard Rede 1399
- Robert Sutton 1401
- Thomas Bache, third term 1403
- William Tynbegh, second term 1405
- James Fitzwilliam 1413
- William Tynbegh, third term 1415
- James Uriell 1417
- James Cornwalsh, first term 1420
- Richard Sydgrave 1423
- James Cornwalsh, second term 1426 (murdered 1441)
- John Cornwalsh, son of the previous, first term 1441 (disputed with Michael Gryffin)
- Michael Gryffin or Gryffen 1441 (disputed with John Cornwalsh)
- John Cornwalsh, second term 1446
- Thomas Bathe, 1st Baron Louth 1473
- Henry Duffe 1478
- Thomas Plunket 1480
- Oliver FitzEustace 1482
- John Burnell 1482 Deputy
- John Estrete 1487 Deputy
- John Wyse 1492
- Clement Fitzleones 1493 Deputy
- Walter Ivers 1494
- John Topcliffe 1496
- Walter St. Lawrence 1496
- Thomas Kent 1504
- Richard Golding 1511
- Bartholomew Dillon 1514
- Richard Golding, second term 1515
- Patrick Finglas 1520
- Gerald Aylmer 25 June 1534
- Patrick Finglas, second term, 1535
- Richard Delahide 1537
- James Bathe 1540
- Lucas Dillon 1570
- Robert Napier 1593
- Edmund Pelham 1602
- Humphrey Winch 8 November 1606
- John Denham 1609
- William Methold, or Methwold 1612
- Sir John Blennerhassett 1621
- Richard Bolton 1625
- Edward Bolton 1639
- Miles Corbet 1655
- John Bysse 1660
- Henry Hene 1680
- Stephen Rice 1687
- John Hely 5 December 1690
- Sir Robert Doyne 10 May 1695
- Nehemiah Donnellan 27 December 1703
- Richard Freeman 25 June 1706
- Robert Rochfort 12 June 1707
- Joseph Deane 14 October 1714
- Jeffrey Gilbert 16 June 1715
- Bernard Hale 9 June 1722
- Thomas Dalton 2 September 1725
- Thomas Marlay 29 September 1730
- John Bowes 21 December 1741
- Edward Willes 11 March 1757
- Anthony Foster 5 September 1766
- James Dennis (afterwards Baron Tracton) 3 July 1777
- Walter Hussey Burgh 2 July 1782
- Barry Yelverton (afterwards 1st Viscount Avonmore) 29 November 1783
- Standish O'Grady (afterwards 1st Viscount Guillamore) 5 October 1805
- Henry Joy 6 January 1831
- Stephen Woulfe 20 July 1838
- Maziere Brady, 11 February 1840
- David Richard Pigot 1 September 1846
- Christopher Palles 10 February 1874

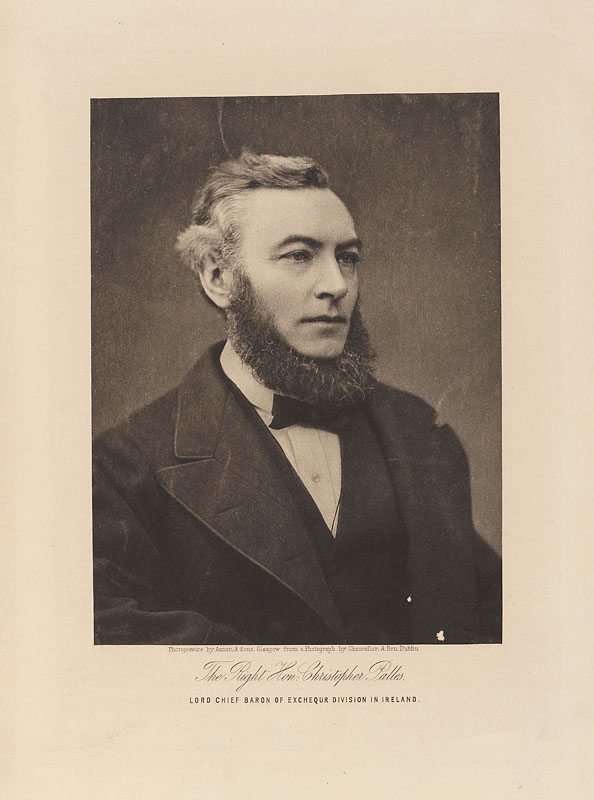
Chief Baron Palles
