= Purveyance =

Ancient right of English monarchs to requisition goods

Purveyance, a greatly expanded form of the ancient customary right of prise, was a medieval prerogative right of the English Crown to purchase provisions and other necessaries, at an appraised price, and to requisition horses and vehicles for royal use. The ancient right was for the benefit of the poor, but was developed in England, over the course of the late eleventh through the fourteenth centuries, as the purveyance system, by which the king was able to collect goods needed for both household and military use. The system was open to abuse from corrupt officials, who often requisitioned goods for profit or used extortion and other means to obtain items or money, the proceeds of which were not accounted for or delivered to the king. Consequently, English monarchs enacted numerous statutes, though largely ineffectual, in an attempt to curb the corruption. Purveyance for military purposes was discontinued in 1362, with the right itself finally abolished in 1660.

== History ==
=== Under Edwards I–III ===
Prise, an ancient right of the English court, permitted the customary purchase of food. Edward I significantly expanded this into the purveyance system, which was necessary for the English Army during its invasion of Scotland, a region with limited agricultural productivity. Sheriffs would buy food at a set price in the shires, and sellers were compelled to sell. Edward's government created a system to store and convoy large quantities of food from the English Midlands to English-controlled southern Scotland.

Administrative historians consider this a significant achievement in governmental organizational power, but also criticized it as effectively a racket because Edward paid late and at low prices.

Edward I also employed purveyance for his many Welsh campaigns, utilizing produce from both the Isle of Anglesey and Ireland. Purveyance largely caused intense dissatisfaction during Edward's campaign in Gascony from 1294–98, leading to a nationwide investigation into abuses by royal administrators, including purveyors, in 1298.

Purveyance remained the favored method for English kings to obtain food and other necessities for their armies, castles, garrisons, and itinerant households. Both Edward II and Edward III extensively utilized the system: Edward II during his unsuccessful campaign against Scotland and the civil war against Thomas of Lancaster, and Edward III during his relatively successful campaign against Scotland and subsequent efforts in France during the Hundred Years' War.

Under Edward III, the issues of corruption and abuses accompanying the collection of goods for military use reached a critical point. Complaints became so widespread in the opening years of the Hundred Years' War that Edward III launched another nationwide investigation, leading to the effective removal of most purveyors from office. However, purveyance was too valuable a royal privilege to relinquish, and only in 1362, under intense pressure from Parliament, did Edward III agree to discontinue its use for military purposes.

=== Under Henry V ===
When Henry V was preparing for war against France during the Hundred Years' War, he ordered the continuation of purveyance for military purposes. He reportedly instructed all purveyors to be fair and reasonable, to avoid taking goods from church property, and to pay a fair price. However, many purveyors engaged in widespread abuses, extorting foodstuffs from peasants, buying at low prices and selling for profit, or failing to pay altogether. Confronted by purveyors backed by armed men, most peasants dared not resist. King Henry, acknowledging the corruption among his purveyors, announced in a proclamation that anyone harassed or aggrieved by any captain or soldier should present themselves to the seneschal of the king's treasury. The king proclaimed that complete justice would be provided upon his arrival at Southampton. The retention of purveyance as a tool for supplying the growing royal household would eventually face scrutiny during the Stuarts' reign.

=== Abolition ===
James VI and I made attempts to reform purveyance and the royal household. In October 1605, the Earl of Northampton and Robert Cecil tasked chief cart-taker Robert Fletcher with preparing a document outlining abuses and bribery. King James informed Parliament in 1606 that he desired the elimination of purveyance-related corruption.

In the 17th century, purveyance generated approximately £40,000 annually for the Crown. However, Parliament sought its abolition, but James I was unwilling to relinquish this right without financial compensation, known as "composition". Parliament feared this would only lead to further corruption, and consequently, no changes were made to the system during James I's reign.

During the Commonwealth an Act for taking away Purveyance and compositions for Purveyance was passed 12 December 1656 and given assent 9 June 1657. However, since all laws of that period were declared null and void upon the Restoration, the Tenures Abolition Act 1660 finally abolished purveyance and other feudal charges.

== See also ==
- Eminent domain
- Royal warrant of appointment
