= John de Shriggeley =

Irish statesman and judge

Sir John de Shriggeley, whose family name is also spelt Shirggeley and Shryggeley (died after 1405) was an Irish statesman and judge who held several important judicial offices, including Chief Justice of the Irish Common Pleas. Although he committed two murders, he was a valued servant of the English Crown.

== Family ==
He was born in County Dublin, son of John de Shriggeley senior. The de Shriggeley family are said to have been relatively recent arrivals in Ireland from Cheshire, who took their family name from the village of Pott Shrigley in that county.

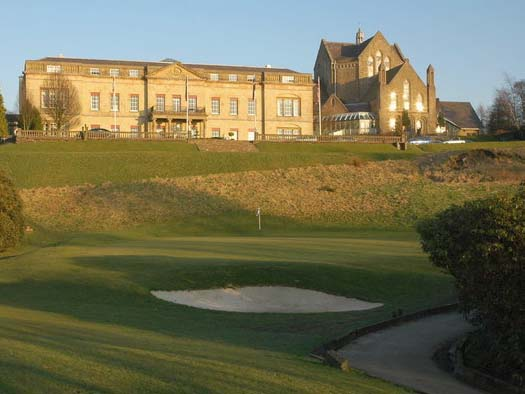
Shrigley Hall, Pott Shrigley, Cheshire

=== Marriage ===
In 1385, he married Nicola, daughter of Nicholas Bathe, and widow of Sir Simon Cusacke of Beaurepaire (died c.1384), who had been a substantial landowner in County Meath, and had been summoned to the English Parliament of 1376 (the so-called Good Parliament) as Baron Culmullen. As the remarriage of a widow required the Crown's consent, their marriage without a royal licence was technically an offence, but the couple quickly received a royal pardon, in consideration of John's "good service" to the Crown. Simon Cusacke and Nicola had a son, John who was still a minor at the time of his father's death. Simon, probably by an earlier marriage had two daughters: Joanna, who married another leading Irish judge, John de Sotheron of Great Mitton, Lancashire, and had issue, and Margaret

=== Inheritance ===
Nicola brought John a substantial dowry, including lands at Culmullen in County Meath but they had great difficulty in establishing her right to possession of Culmullen, ownership of which was disputed by various relatives of Nicola's first husband. In 1393 John and Nicola complained to the Crown that they had been unlawfully dispossessed of their lands for more than seven years (i.e. since their marriage). The dispute turned violent over the following few years, as Shriggeley and one Geoffrey Cusacke (who was a nephew of Nicola's first husband Sir Simon Cusacke) were bound over in 1394–5 to be of good behaviour, to find men of good social standing to act as sureties for their conduct, and to pledge to do no harm to each other. The Cusacke family continued their struggle to gain possession of Culmullen for at least another generation, long after Shriggeley's death.

== Judge ==
Shriggeley was appointed second Baron of the Court of Exchequer (Ireland) in 1382. In August 1384 he became Chief Justice of the Irish Common Pleas; John Brekdene, the Chief Remembrancer of the Exchequer, replaced him as Baron. As was not uncommon at the time, Shriggeley was ordered not to intermeddle with his previous office (possibly he had hoped to continue drawing both salaries). In 1385 he and Roger Bekefotd, Mayor of Dublin, were appointed to a Commission of Gaol Delivery to clear Dublin gaol. He became Chief Escheator of Ireland in 1386, and at the same time, he was made Chief Clerk of the Markets, and Keeper of the Weights and Measures for Ireland. He stepped down as Chief Justice in 1388, although he sat as a High Court judge on at least one further occasion.

His ability to perform his judicial functions must have been greatly hindered by the fact that both the Common Pleas and the Exchequer for some decades sat in Carlow, which was closer to the heart of Anglo-Norman Ireland than Dublin, but was regularly raided and burnt by hostile Irish clans. His colleague John Brettan wrote in a petition to the Crown in 1376 that most of the judges dared not travel to Carlow. Some of them, like Robert de Holywood and John Tirel, refused to leave Dublin at all "on account of the dangers". Shriggeley himself did manage to hold the assizes in Carlow for several terms in 1382–5, and was awarded two extra payments of 10 marks as a result.

He was a trusted servant of the Crown (an order from 1386 survives for the payment of his arrears of salary as Chief Justice), and in particular, he enjoyed the confidence of Robert de Vere, Duke of Ireland, the prime royal favourite of King Richard II through much of the 1380s. However, the Duke's downfall in 1388 does not seem to have harmed Shriggeley's career. In 1389 in consideration of his seven years of good service in the "Irish wars" and in "diverse offices", he was given a knighthood and granted lands at Drogheda.

== Murderer ==
It was no doubt his good services to the Crown which led to his being pardoned in December 1389 for killing Nicholas Cusacke and Richard Cormygan: he was pardoned after a plea for mercy from Geoffrey Vale (this was probably the Geoffrey Vale who was High Sheriff of Carlow in 1374). Little is known of the details of the murders, although Nicholas's surname suggests that the crime was connected with the long-running dispute over possession of the former Cusacke lands in County Meath, which were held by Shriggeley in right of his wife Nicola. This violent dispute, which continued for many years after Shriggeley's death, was a cause of great concern to the Crown in the 1390s.

== Last years ==
In 1390 he was granted the lease of "the watermill below Dublin Castle". In 1395 on the King's instructions he conveyed to Robert Fitzleones lands in County Meath which had been the subject of a lawsuit in Chancery. In 1400 he is listed in the Chancery rolls in connection with a writ of mainprise, i.e. an order to the sheriff to discharge a prisoner who had produced a person to act as surety for their further appearance in Court. In 1403 he was described as living at Skryne, County Meath. In the same year, he was appointed Captain of the Militia, Keeper of the Peace and a member of the Commission of Array for Skryne and Dees (possibly Decies?). In 1404 he was appointed an acting justice, one of four senior judges who tried an action for novel disseisin between Nicholas Crystor and the Stokes family concerning lands at Siddan, near Strokestown in Meath. He was still living in the following year, when the Crown granted him letters of protection (these were usually granted for a journey abroad).

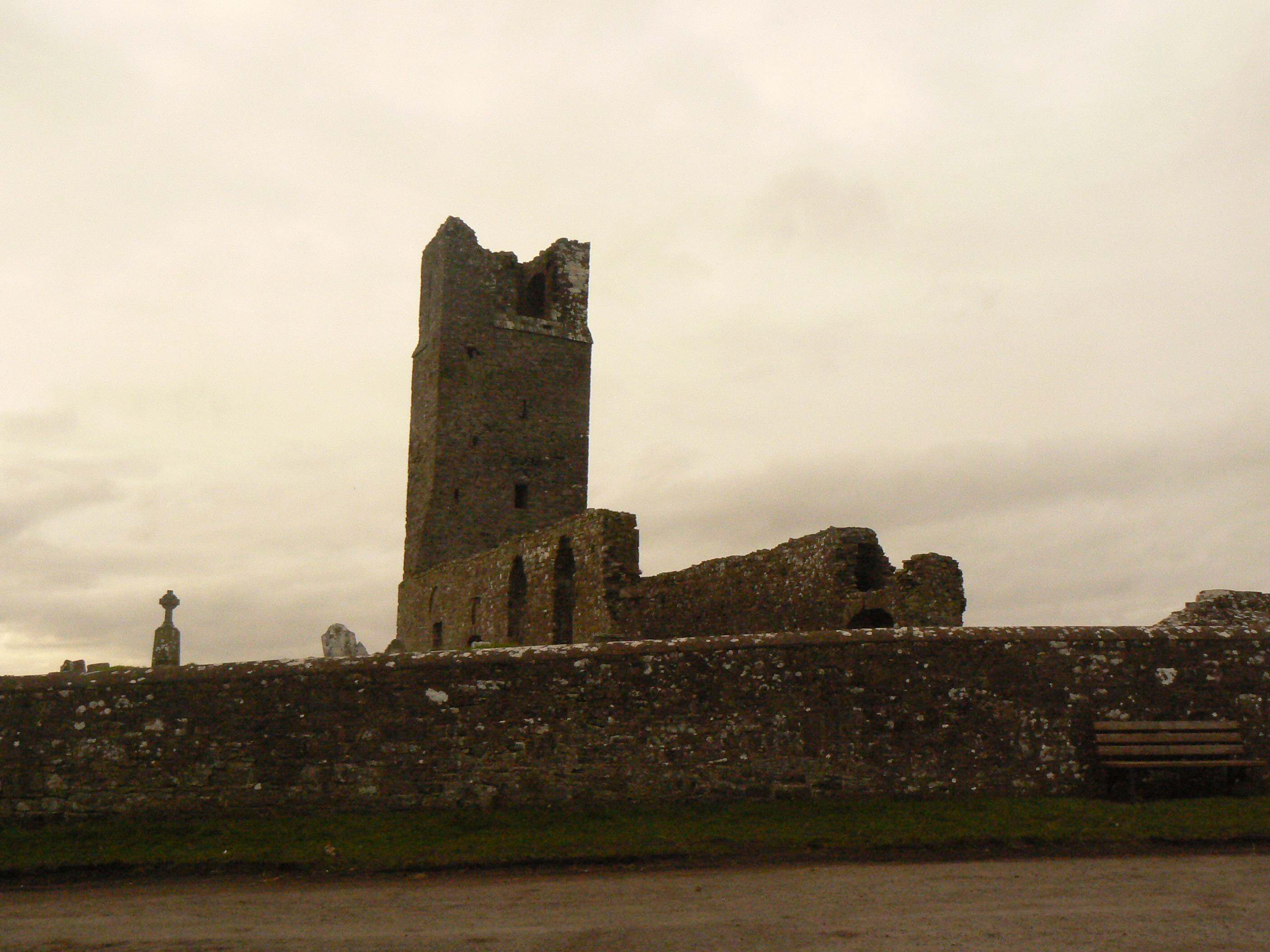
Skryne, County Meath, where Shriggeley spent his later years
