= Walter Cotterell =

Irish barrister and Crown official

Walter FitzWilliam Cotterell (died c. 1388/9) was an Irish barrister and Crown official of the late fourteenth century. He was Serjeant-at-law (Ireland) and acted from time to time as a judge of gaol delivery and of assize, although he was never a justice in the Royal Courts. The evidence suggests that he was a conscientious and hard-working official who enjoyed the complete trust of the English Crown.

He was born in Kells, County Kilkenny, the son of William Cotterell. The family had a long-standing association with Kells, and later lived in Kilkenny city. His father was acting as a judge in the 1360s, as was John Cotterell, who was presumably Walter's uncle.

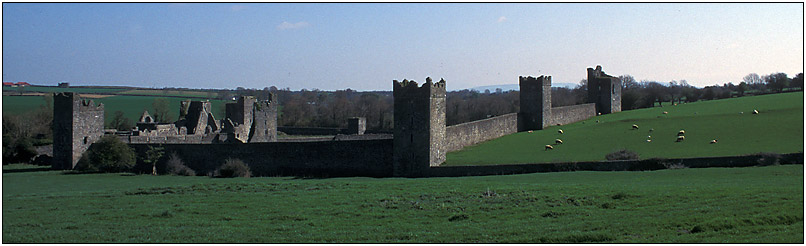
Ruins of Kells Priory, Kilkenny: the Cotterell family had a long-standing association with the town of Kells

== Career ==
He was appointed King's Serjeant in 1374. His salary was 100 shillings a year. As was often the case his appointment was limited in area, in his career to Munster, County Wexford and County Kilkenny. By that time he was already a valued Crown servant, who had been entrusted in 1359 with collecting a subsidy. In 1373-4 he conducted "numerous inquisitions" on behalf of the Crown, and was given the power to arrest ships, for which labour he received a fee of 10 marks (£6.66). The inquisitions in question lasted for four weeks and his travels on official business required the use of eight horses. Shortly afterwards he was appointed to a three-man commission into the Crown's right of treasure trove in County Wexford, which lasted for 2 weeks; he did not receive a fee. The other two members were both serving High Court judges, John Keppock and William de Karlell, an indication of Cotterell's high standing with the Crown. In 1374 he was summoned to a meeting of the Great Council to be held in England to discuss Irish affairs. In 1375 he was commissioned as one of the four justices for gaol delivery in Waterford city, and it was specified that he must always be included on the commission.

He never became a High Court judge, but in addition to sitting in gaol delivery as required, in 1380 in his capacity as "Narrator Regis" (King's Serjeant), the Privy Council of Ireland appointed him as an acting judge of assize for Munster, County Kilkenny and County Wexford. The senior Serjeant assigned to ride that circuit, John Tirel, was unable or unwilling to act "on account of the dangers of the roads" (the journey from Dublin to Carlow was notoriously dangerous, as was life in Carlow itself, due to constant attacks by the local Gaelic tribes, even though the Royal Courts sat there till 1391). Cotterell received a fee of £75 for his nine months in office, and a further years' fee for performing unspecified official duties in Leinster. He was in County Cork on official business in 1382. He was still King's Serjeant in 1385. In that year he was again required to act as an extra judge, to hear the King's Pleas in the Court of the Seneschal of the liberty of Kilkenny. In addition he and John de Sotheron, during his brief tenure as Lord Chief Justice of Ireland, were appointed to deal with those petitions which would normally be dealt with by the Lord Chancellor of Ireland, William Tany, who was then absent in England.

In 1388 he received permission to go on a pilgrimage to Rome, and may have died on the journey or in Rome itself, as his name disappears from the official records thereafter. Chief Justice Tirel, for whom Cotterell had often acted as Deputy, was ordered to sit as Justice in Carlow in his place in 1389. Cotterell's precise date of death is not recorded.

== Family ==
He had a son, William, who was a burgess of Kilkenny in the early 1380s. It is unclear if they were related to Sir Patrick Cotterell, who was Deputy Admiral of Ireland in 1412-14. Sir John Cotterell of Kells, who was executed with Sir Eustace le Poer (a member of one of the dominant landowning families in County Tipperary and Kilkenny) for taking part in the rebellion of Maurice FitzGerald, 1st Earl of Desmond in 1346, was a cousin of William. Robert Cotterell, possibly another relative of William, was appointed a justice of the Court of King's Bench (Ireland) in 1388. Patrick Cotterell of Kilkenny received a royal pardon for various offences in 1407. A later William Cotterell, probably a direct descendant, was appointed justice and Keeper of the Peace for Kilkenny in 1431.

== Sources ==
- Hart, A. R. A History of the King's Serjeants-at-law in Ireland Dublin Four Courts Press 2000
- Graves, James and Prim, John "The History, Architecture and Antiquities of the Cathedral Church of St Canice, Kilkenny" Dublin Hodges Smith and Co. 1857
- Haydn, Joseph Book of Dignities London Longman, Brown, Green and Longmans 1851
- Smyth, Constantine Joseph Chronicle of the Law Officers of Ireland London Butterworths 1839
