= Peter Rowe (judge) =

Irish judge

Peter Rowe (died c.1401) was an Irish judge who held the office of Lord Chief Justice of Ireland intermittently between 1388 and 1397.

== Background ==
Elrington Ball states that he was born in Ireland, to a family which was of English origin, but which had long been settled in Ireland. According to MacLysaght, the leading expert on Irish surnames, the name Rowe or Roe, has several different origins in Ireland, some Gaelic and some English, and is mainly associated with Waterford. He seems unlikely to have been the Peter Rowe who was indicted for felony in 1375.

== Career ==
He was in England, probably qualifying as a barrister, in 1377. He became friendly with Robert Braybrooke, later Bishop of London and Lord Chancellor of Ireland, who exercised considerable influence over Irish affairs. He returned to Ireland before 1380, and held office as King's Serjeant from 1381 to 1387. In 1386, on the Crown's instructions, he conveyed the lands of Laracor in County Meath to Thomas Cusack.

He was appointed Lord Chief Justice in September 1388 and was given custody of the Great Seal of Ireland. In 1390 he and his future colleague John Fitzadam, together with Richard Cruys, heard a case of novel disseisin brought by Nicholas Forster against William Waffre (Fitzadam was an interesting choice of judge as he had not yet qualified as a lawyer). He was briefly transferred to the office of Chief Justice of the Irish Common Pleas in 1391, on the urging of Bishop Braybrooke, "with the same fees that John Keppock previously enjoyed". He was removed from office in 1395, briefly restored, and finally dismissed in 1397. He died before 1402, when his widow married Sir Jenico d'Artois. Throughout his career he continued to enjoy the powerful patronage of Bishop Braybrooke, who was Chancellor of Ireland in the late 1390s. Rowe was ex officio a member of the Privy Council of Ireland, and we have a record of his attendance at the Council meeting in October 1391.

There is a glimpse of his career in the Close Rolls of Richard II for 1380–81, in a case in which the English Crown had an interest, since the feudal overlord of the lands in question was the King's cousin Edmund Mortimer, then a royal ward. Two citizens of Dublin, Richard Dunart and Thomas Cusack, each claimed the right to hold part of the Mortimer lands at Trim, County Meath. Rowe, who as Lord Chief Justice presided over the hearing, was commanded by the King to "do justice according to the laws and customs of Ireland". Richard and Thomas were successful in their claim, although they apparently did not recover possession of the lands until 1386.

In 1392 he issued a writ of supersedeas to stay any further criminal proceedings against Richard Wynchendon's son, who was accused of felony, he having surrendered himself and found sureties for his good behaviour.

== Family ==
He married Joan, or Joanne Taaffe, daughter of Sir Nicholas Taaffe of Liscarton Castle, County Meath. They had at least one son, Nicholas, who inherited Liscarton from his mother, and was given full possession of the lands in 1427 (an unusually late date since he must have attained his majority several years earlier). The Rowe estates eventually passed by marriage to the Barnewalls of Roseland, a junior branch of the family of Baron Trimlestown. Joan married secondly the leading military commander, statesman and landowner Sir Jenico d'Artois (died 1426), a native of Gascony, by whom she had at least three more children, Jenico d'Artois the younger, Sir John d'Artois and Jane, Lady Gormanston. She and her second husband are known to have been engaged in a private war in 1402 to protect her lands in Meath. She died about 1413.

Legal offices
Preceded by Richard Plunkett	Lord Chief Justice of Ireland; 1388–1395	Succeeded by William Hankford
Preceded by William Tynbegh	Lord Chief Justice of Ireland; 1397–1397	Succeeded by Stephen de Bray
