= Robert de Holywood =

Irish judge and landowner

Robert de Holywood (died 1384) was an Irish judge and landowner who held the office of Chief Baron of the Irish Exchequer. He was the ancestor of the Holywood family of Artane Castle, and of the St. Lawrence family, Earls of Howth. He was a substantial landowner with property in Dublin, Meath and Louth. He became extremely unpopular, and was removed from office after numerous complaints of "oppression and extortion" were made against him. These were apparently inspired ĺargely by his close association in the mid-1370s with Sir William de Windsor, the embattled Lord Lieutenant of Ireland.

== Career ==
He took his surname from the parish of Holywood (also spelt Hollywood), near Balbriggan, County Dublin. He was a younger son: an inquest in 1408 described him as the brother of William Holywood. He was appointed Chief Remembrancer of the Court of Exchequer (Ireland) in 1348, his main task being to organise the Court records for the judges to read. In 1359 he was charged with organising the defence of Leinster. Much of the Anglo-Irish administration, including the Courts of Exchequer and Common Pleas, moved from Dublin to Carlow in about 1361, on the grounds that Carlow was more central and convenient for the English government (there was at the time no capital city of Ireland or seat of central government as such). Robert in his capacity as Remembrancer was one of the first officials to make the move.

== Judge ==
He was appointed Chief Baron in 1363: he was superseded the following year, during a general "shake-up" of Irish officials. He was reappointed in 1367. He probably spent most of his time in Dublin, as conditions in Carlow had become extremely dangerous, due to regular raids by the Irish of Leinster: the town was burnt in 1363, 1376 and 1391, and the Exchequer moved back to Dublin for a time in the 1360s. In 1376 his colleague John Brettan wrote that the situation was such that most of the Barons, other than Brettan himself, who was a local man, dared not travel to Carlow.

In 1376 Robert was finally dismissed from office as Chief Baron, and given his immense unpopularity with the ruling class, was probably lucky to avoid more serious sanctions. He died eight years later.

In 1361 he received a royal pardon for purchasing land without royal permission, something which was strictly forbidden for Crown officials. This pardon may relate to his purchase of Artane (originally called Tartaine) Castle, of which he was the first recorded owner and which remained in his family for two centuries (unlike many judges of the time, he was not in holy orders).

In 1367 he sat on a powerful commission to determine whether or not the manor of Rathkeale was Crown land, but it apparently never reported, since a similar inquiry was launched in 1374.

Ball argues that while some of his fellow judges, notably John Brettan, willingly exposed themselves to the dangers of going on assize, Holywood preferred the comparative security of Dublin. This may well be an unfair judgment since Carlow, the seat of the royal courts, was notoriously dangerous. Brettan himself remarked that many of his fellow judges were simply afraid to travel there: if Holywood preferred to stay in Dublin, he was certainly not unique. His fellow Chief Justice John Tirel was another judge who refused to go on assize "on account of the dangers of the roads". As for Brettan, while he undoubtedly showed considerable courage in braving the hazards of the journey, he was a Carlow man himself, and had long played a part in the town's defences.

In 1373, in consideration of his good services to the Crown, Robert was given permission to found a chantry with five chaplains at Holywood and in 1376 was given permission to allow them to choose a warden. The chaplains were required to pray for the souls of Sir Robert himself, his two wives, and Queen Philippa of Hainault, the deceased wife of King Edward III.

== Downfall ==
In 1376 his career came to an abrupt end. The unpopular and combative Lord Lieutenant of Ireland, Sir William de Windsor, was summoned to England in February of that year to answer numerous charges of corruption and maladministration and was suspended from office. At the same time a flood of complaints by the Anglo-Irish nobility of "extortions, oppressions and injuries" was directed against Holywood and the second Baron of the Irish Exchequer, William de Karlell, who were clearly seen as key members of the Windsor regime. Both judges were summoned to England, along with Windsor, Stephen de Valle, Bishop of Meath, Sir John Cruys of Thorncastle and others, to answer for their conduct. The English Privy Council, having examined them, dismissed them from office and sent them back to Ireland for further questioning by the English official Sir Nicholas Dagworth, who had assumed emergency powers of government during the crisis. However the matter ended there; the Anglo-Irish nobility seems to have been content with the two judges' dismissal. Holywood petitioned for repayment of the expenses of his journey to England, and it was ordered that these be paid on the appointment of the new Chief Baron. The judges' associate Sir John Cruys of Merrion Castle went on to have a highly successful career. Holywood, in a petition of 1379, asked for a suspension of any further legal proceedings against him, and for the restoration of his property. Holywood retired into private life, but Karlell was eventually reinstated and was himself appointed Chief Baron, a few months before he died in 1383. Holywood died in 1384.

== Family and descendants ==
Robert's first wife was named Joan; his second wife, who outlived him, was called Nesta. In 1385 Nesta was granted the customary licence from the Crown to a widow to remarry whom she pleased. She also received one-third of her husband's lands as her dower. At Robert's death in 1384, his son Sir Christopher de Holywood (who must have been Nesta's son) succeeded to his estate: since Christopher was described as 24 years old in 1408, he must have been in his infancy when his father died. In 1401 he was appointed a justice of the peace for Dublin. In 1403 he received a pardon for all trespasses committed by him on royal land: this apparently means that he had entered his late father's lands before the Crown formally regranted them to him. In 1408 he also succeeded to the estates of his cousin John Holywood, son of William.

Christopher became a distinguished soldier, and in 1413 he was appointed one of the commanders of the King's army in Ireland. He married c.1400 Katherine Preston, widow of William Lawless. He died in or about 1416. He was succeeded as the owner of Artane by his son, the younger Robert de Holywood, who was then a minor (he was born in 1401) and was made a Royal ward. Robert was given full control of his estates on attaining his majority in 1422. He served as Sheriff of County Dublin in 1426. He died in 1431, leaving three daughters, Margaret, Elizabeth and Eleanor, as his co-heiresses. Most of the Holywood estates passed to the Burnell family of Balgriffin towards the end of the fifteenth century.

Christopher also had at least one daughter Eleanor, who married the 1st Baron Howth (his name is variously given as Christopher and Stephen), and was the mother of Christopher St Lawrence, 2nd Baron Howth.

Christopher's widow Katherine married as her third husband Sir Richard FitzEustace, Lord Chancellor of Ireland.
