= John Bermyngham =

Irish lawyer and judge

John Bermyngham or Bermingham (died 1415) was an Irish barrister and judge. He was one of the first Crown Law officers to be referred to as the King's Serjeant. He was later appointed Lord Chief Justice of Ireland, but did not take up the office.

He belonged to the prominent Anglo-Irish Bermingham dynasty, which acquired the titles Earl of Louth and Baron Athenry. In 1248 the Crown granted to Peter Bermingham and his heirs the lands at Esker, Lucan, Dublin to hold as tenant in chief. He and his heirs were required to perform knight-service in return.

He was appointed King's Serjeant in 1388; he was one of the first Irish law officers to be described as Serjeant, although the office itself dates from 1261. His appointment was limited to Dublin and the counties of the Pale. Hart notes that such local appointments were common at the time, reflecting the disturbed state of English rule in Ireland, when no one travelled from Dublin to County Cork without an armed escort, and at a time when Carlow, the seat of the Exchequer of Ireland and the Royal Courts, had recently been burnt. In 1391 he is found pleading a case between the Crown and the prior of the Priory of All Hallows, which was situated just outside the walls of Dublin, as to the ownership of lands at Clonturk (corresponding with present-day Drumcondra), which the prior claimed as lands of the Priory, but which Bermingham argued had reverted to the Crown.

He went to England to further his law studies in 1392 (Ireland at that time had no law school), having obtained the requisite official permission, along with his colleagues William Tynbegh and John Fitzadam. Hart believes that he acted as Serjeant until 1402, when he became second justice of the Court of King's Bench (Ireland). In 1404 he was one of four judges who tried an action for novel disseisin between Nicholas Crystor and the Stokes family concerning lands at Siddan, County Meath. He was chosen as Chief Justice in 1407 but he cannot have taken up office, since Stephen de Bray, appointed in 1403, remained Chief Justice until 1426. The two judges sat together the same year on an inquisition, requested by the abbot of St. Mary's Abbey, Dublin to determine the boundaries of the township of Kilternan, which was the abbey's property. John died in 1415.

He was probably the grandfather of Philip Bermingham (died 1490), Lord Chief Justice of Ireland. Richard Bermingham, who was appointed second Baron of the Court of Exchequer (Ireland) in 1420, may also have been a relative.
