= Richard Plunkett =

Irish judge and statesman

Richard Plunkett (c.1340-1393) was an eminent Irish judge and statesman of the fourteenth century, who held the offices of Lord Chief Justice of Ireland and Lord Chancellor of Ireland. His descendants held the titles Baron Dunsany, Baron Killeen and Earl of Fingall.

== Family background ==
He was born about 1340, the son of John Plunkett of Rathregan (or Rathgreen), County Meath and Alicia d'Arcy (or Alicia de Trim). The Plunketts were a long-established Anglo-Irish family of the Pale, who originally settled at Beaulieu in County Louth about 1200: his mother Alicia is also described as being "of Beaulieu". Another branch of the family, descendants of Richard's brother, another John, later held the title Baron Louth.

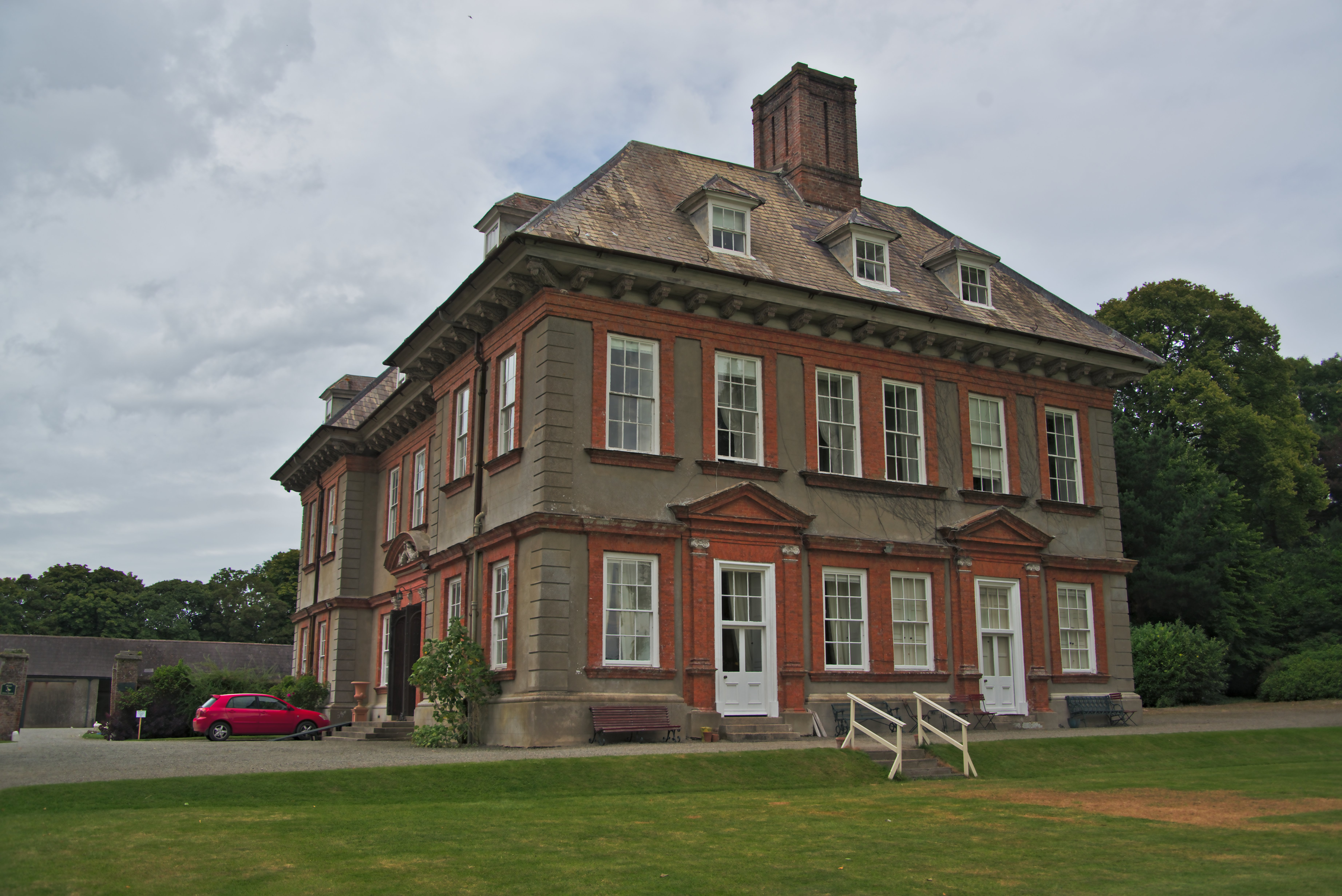
Beaulieu, the ancestral home of the Plunkett family, present day

== Career ==
He was considered to be one of the best lawyers of his generation, and was appointed King's Serjeant in 1372. He was already sufficiently well respected by 1364 to form part of the powerful delegation sent to England to describe the state of the Irish government and to complain to King Edward III about the corruption and maladministration of certain officials of the Crown in Ireland; the complaints were directed in particular against Thomas de Burley, the Lord Chancellor of Ireland. Richard sat on a Royal Commission which was set up to examine and remedy the abuses complained of. He was also a noted Parliamentarian; he sat in the Irish House of Commons and took a leading part in the Kilkenny Parliament of 1374. He was a member of the Privy Council of Ireland and attended several meetings of the Great Council. He became a judge of the Irish Court of Common Pleas in 1376. In 1381 he was appointed to try an action for novel disseisin against Richard Dowdall and his wife Isabella. In July 1388 he was promoted to Chief Justice of the King's Bench, on the same terms enjoyed by John Keppock, and the following September he was made Lord Chancellor. He had already been acting as Chancellor for some months, due to the pressure of business on his predecessor, and was specially authorized to seal Court writs without affixing the Great Seal of Ireland to them. Elrington Ball puts his death around 1389, but O'Flanagan states that he was still alive in 1393, when Richard Northalis succeeded him as Lord Chancellor.

== Character ==
O'Flanagan calls him one of the most eminent Irishmen of his time, a lawyer of great distinction and equally distinguished for his Parliamentary career.

== Descendants ==
Richard married Margaret, widow of Robert Burnell, of the leading Anglo-Irish Burnell family of Balgriffin, County Dublin. They had three children, Christopher, John, and Anne. Christopher was the father of the first Baron Killeen.

Legal offices
Preceded by Edmund de Clay	Lord Chief Justice of the King's Bench for Ireland; 1388–1388	Succeeded by Peter Rowe
