= John Fitzadam =

Irish judge

John Fitzadam (died c.1419) was an Irish judge of the late fourteenth and early fifteenth century. He is notable for his very long tenure as Chief Justice of the Irish Common Pleas; he held the office for twenty-three years, in the reigns of three English kings. Some years after his death, he was accused of judicial misconduct, in that he had unduly favoured one party in a lawsuit, but it is impossible now to determine the truth of the matter.

== Early career ==
He was a member of a long-established Dublin city family. Sir Thomas Fitzadam, a leading Crown official in the first quarter of the thirteenth century, who served as Chief Escheator in 1218, justice itinerant in 1223 and Royal Forester at Glencree (the only Irish royal forest) in 1219, was Irish born, and it is possible that either Thomas or his brother Richard was John's ancestor.

He is first heard of in England, where he lived from 1379 to 1383. He then returned to Ireland. He appears to have held an official position in Ireland, and he sat on a commission concerning Dublin Castle in 1384. In 1390, despite his lack of formal legal qualifications, he sat as an extra judge to hear a case of novel disseisin, which suggests that even at this early stage of his career his legal ability was already recognised. He then decided to study law and obtained the requisite official permission to go to England for that purpose in 1391 (Ireland did not then have its own law school), as did his future colleagues William Tynbegh and John Bermyngham. He practised as an attorney in Westminster Hall and is said to have enjoyed considerable success in his career there. He was a friend of another successful Irish lawyer in England, William Skrene, who was later briefly Chief Baron of the Irish Exchequer, but spent most of his career in England. At an unknown date, Fitzadam returned to Ireland to practice at the Irish Bar. He was appointed Chief Justice of the Common Pleas in 1396 and held office until 1419.

That he was held in high regard by the English Crown is shown by the grant to him and his heirs by King Henry IV in 1410, "in consideration of his long and faithful service", of a parcel of land at Stackallen, County Meath, together with the advowson (the right to present the parish priest) of the living of Stackallen. The living had been forfeited in the 1340s from the former Lord Chief Justice of Ireland, Elias de Asshebournham, who was then in disgrace. The grant was conditional on payment of a rose every year. The reference to his heirs suggests that he was married with children. In 1414 he received some of the lands of John, 5th Baron Darcy de Knayth (died 1411) to hold during the minority of Philip, the 6th Baron, who was about 14 when his father died.

== Judge ==
There are a number of records of him performing his judicial duties: these are mainly concerned with the issue of pardons or other acts of clemency, particularly in actions for recovery of debt. At the time it was a common legal device for a successful creditor to get a sentence of outlawry passed on the debtor. In 1409 Fitzadam pardoned Thomas Wells, the vicar of Rathregan, in connection with a lawsuit for debt brought by Richard Dillon. In 1414 he persuaded the Crown "out of pity" to reverse the sentence of outlawry imposed on John Philpot of Drogheda for failure to appear in court to answer a claim for debt, as Philpot had now appeared and submitted to the jurisdiction of the court; and he successfully pleaded for a reversal of outlawry in an almost identical case involving Richard Lang, outlawed on the plea of John Trody, merchant of Dublin, for failure to pay John a debt, and in yet another case where Robert Cantwell was outlawed on the suit of William Preston.

In 1404 he was one of four judges who tried an action for novel disseisin between Nicholas Crystor and the Stokes family concerning lands at Siddan, County Meath. In 1407 he sat on a strong bench to inquire, at the request of the abbot of St. Mary's Abbey, Dublin, into the boundaries of Kilternan and Simmonstown (the township of Kilternan being part of the abbey's lands). In 1412 he and Richard Sydgrave, Baron of the Court of Exchequer (Ireland), sat as judges in a case of novel disseisin brought by Thomas Clone against William Dervoys and his wife Blanche. In 1415 he sat on a high powered commission at Ballygarth, County Meath, headed by the Lord Treasurer of Ireland, to inquire into all cases of trespass in Dublin and three adjoining counties.

== Complaint by the Prior of Mullingar ==
On an unknown date "in the reign of Henry IV" (1399-1413), he and his fellow justices heard an action for debt brought against the prior of Mullingar by the Prior of Llanthony Priory in Monmouthshire. Many years later, in 1427, the prior of Mullingar petitioned the Privy Council, claiming that there was a manifest error in the judgment, by which he had suffered grievous injury. The Council ordered Richard Ashwell, the Master of the Rolls in Ireland, to make a full inquiry into the matter, and to bring his report before the next session of the Irish parliament, so that the injustice, if any, might be corrected.

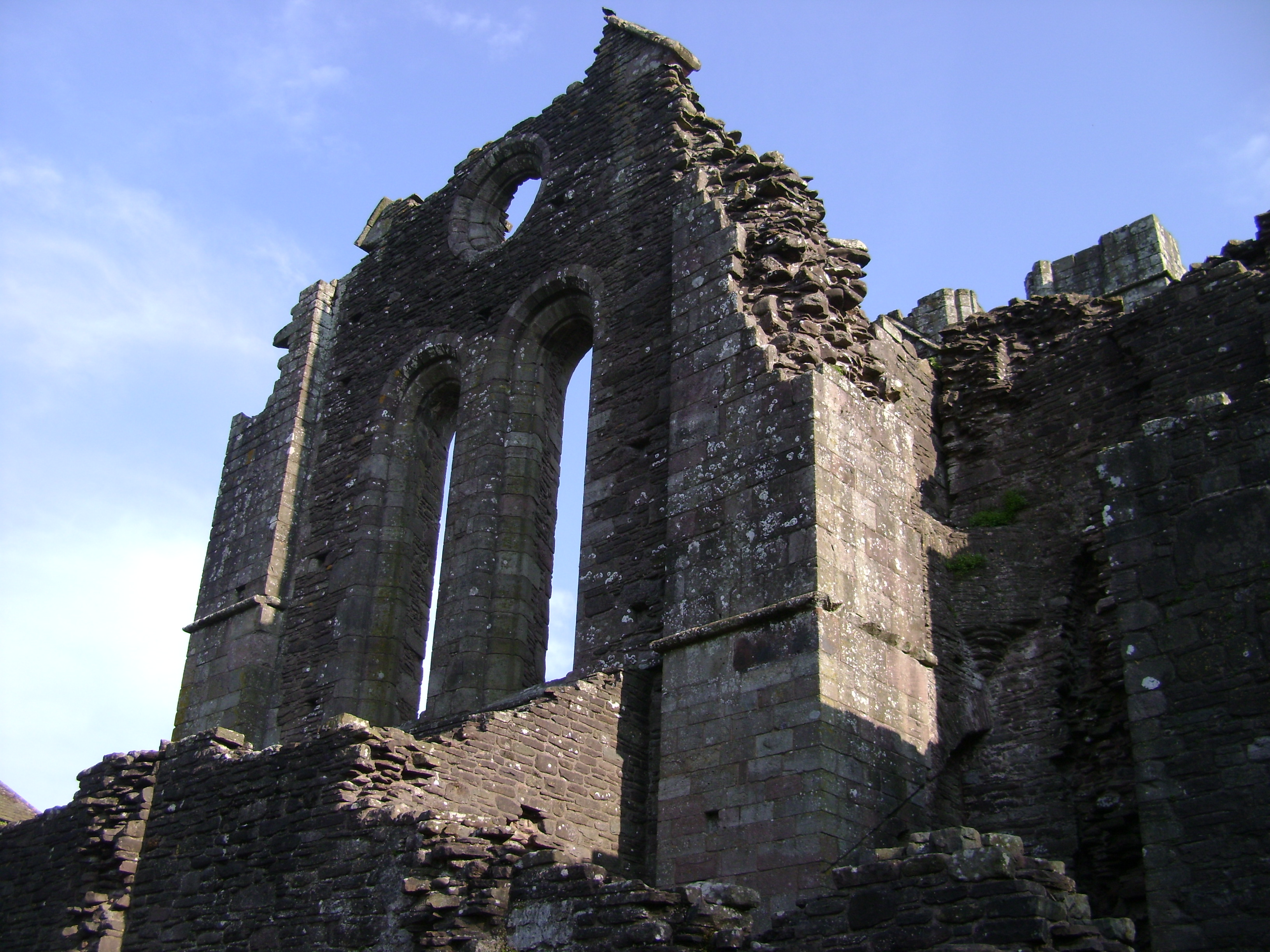
Llanthony Priory: Fitzadam was accused of unduly favouring the Prior of Llanthony in a lawsuit heard before him

== Sources ==
- Ball, F. Elrington The Judges in Ireland 1221-1921 London John Murray 1926
- Mason, William Monck The History and Antiquities of St. Patrick's Cathedral, Dublin Dublin Folens 1820
- Patent Rolls Richard II
- Patent Rolls Henry IV
- Patent Rolls Henry V
- Patent Rolls Henry VI
