= John Giffard (judge) =

English-born lawyer and cleric in Ireland

John Giffard, or Gyffard (died after 1396) was an English-born lawyer and cleric in Ireland in the late fourteenth century, who served briefly as Chief Justice of the Irish Common Pleas.

Little is known of his life before 1377, when he appeared in Ireland as a Crown official. He is known to have travelled through the country on official business, which took him to Ulster in 1383. He was presented to a living in the diocese of Cloyne in 1382 and to another living at Church Lawford, Warwickshire, in 1386. He was appointed Keeper of the Writs in the Court of Common Pleas (Ireland), which was then based in Carlow, and held the position until 1391 when he was replaced by Thomas Gower. He also held the office of chirographer (the official who had responsibility for engrossing fines) in the same Court, which he also surrendered to Gower. Gower acquired the crucial office of Chief Remembrancer of the Exchequer the following year. In 1383 Giffard spent more than two months in County Down administering the Court's business, and was awarded an extra payment of 40 shillings.

In 1385 he was appointed a justice in eyre (itinerant justice) for three counties. He was ordered to act with Edmund de Clay, the then Chief Justice. They were also appointed to a Commission of Oyer and Terminer. He was appointed Chief Justice of the Court of Common Pleas (Ireland) in 1396 but Elrington Ball tells us that he was removed from office a few days later, for unknown reasons.

It is unclear whether he had any connection with the Irish branch of the ancient Giffard family of Devon, who acquired the title Earl of Halsbury. The Irish branch was based at Dromartin, Dundrum, Dublin. There was also a Gyffard family in County Louth in the early 1440s.
