= Richard Rede =

Irish statesman and judge

Richard Rede (died after 1416) was a leading Irish statesman and judge of the late fourteenth and early fifteenth centuries. He held office as Chief Baron of the Irish Exchequer, Lord Chief Justice of Ireland, Deputy Lord Chancellor of Ireland and Deputy Treasurer of Ireland.

He was born in County Meath. Rede (also spelt Reid) had been a common Irish name, especially in Ulster, since the thirteenth century. Little seems to be known about his parents. His wife was Elizabeth Netterville, daughter and heiress of Richard Netterville of Dowth. One branch of the Netterville family would later become one of the most prominent landowning families in Meath, and acquired the title Viscount Netterville.

Rede is best remembered for being kidnapped and held for ransom by the Fleming family, Barons of Slane. They extracted a large sum of money from him, and despite his outraged protests, escaped punishment.

== The Netterville inheritance ==
Elizabeth Netterville, whose father died when she was very young, was made a royal ward. The question of her inheritance, which was considerable, led to bitter disputes between neighbouring landowners, each of whom hoped to gain control of her estate by marrying her to his own heir.

King Richard II appointed John Humbleton, one of his esquires of the body, as her guardian in 1394, after having withdrawn a previous grant of guardianship made to Thomas Butler, a younger son of James Butler, 2nd Earl of Ormond. Elizabeth was kidnapped by members of the Darcy and Cusack families, who no doubt hoped to gain control of her lands. She was soon released, but six years later the Crown was informed that these families still hoped to cheat her out of her inheritance. By 1400 Humbleton, no doubt finding that the wardship was more trouble than it was worth, had granted custody of Elizabeth to Rede, who married her soon afterwards, but this was not the end of the trouble over her inheritance.

== Career ==
Richard spent much of his career moving between Ireland and England, and seems to have been uncertain which country he wished to permanently settle in. In England, he served on a commission of the peace in Kent in 1394 and on a similar commission in Middlesex in 1407. He acted as executor of Robert Braybrooke, Bishop of London, in 1404.

At the same time, he maintained close links with Ireland: he was Chief Baron in 1399-1401 and Lord Chief Justice in 1404-6. Thomas Cranley, Lord Chancellor of Ireland, was due to his advanced age and ill health frequently forced to act through deputies: Rede served as his Deputy in 1404. In 1405 he was required to go to England "to prosecute certain business especially touching the King".

== Abduction and ransom ==
On 5 April 1401 while he was travelling from Drogheda to Trim, Rede was abducted at Rathfeigh near Skryne by Thomas Fleming, 2nd Baron Slane, and imprisoned in nearby Crewyn Castle, which belonged to Thomas's son Christopher. He was held hostage until he paid a ransom of £1000 (a vast sum at the time) to Christopher, and he was also robbed of £200 and numerous official records. What lay behind the episode, which was exceptional even in that violent age, is unclear. It has been suggested that the Flemings, like the Darcys and Cusacks, had previously had hopes of gaining the Netterville lands which Rede had acquired through his marriage to Elizabeth Netterville: while the latter families' abduction of Elizabeth in 1394 seems to have been fruitless, the Flemings' abduction of her husband brought them a substantial profit.

The outraged Rede petitioned the new King Henry IV to visit "suitable punishment" on the Flemings for their crimes so that a "suitable example be made of all who would plan such things". The English Privy Council endorsed the petition, and for a time it seemed that the Flemings would suffer heavily for their treatment of Rede: in June 1401 a powerful commission was appointed to arrest and imprison Lord Slane and his wife Elizabeth Preston. This was, however, an era when the nobility found it easy to obtain a royal pardon for even the most heinous crimes, and in October 1401 Lord Slane, on payment of £30 (a derisory sum compared to the £1200 he had extracted from Rede), was duly pardoned, as was his son Christopher, who paid the same amount in damages. Since Christopher was pardoned for "all other seditious committed in both the present and the previous reign", one must wonder how many other crimes Christopher, who was probably still in his late teens, had already committed.

== Later years ==
After being superseded as Lord Chief Justice in 1406 he returned to England and asked for permission to reside there permanently. Given his ill-treatment by the Flemings and his failure to obtain adequate redress for his wrongs, this was natural enough. Rather surprisingly, he returned to Ireland two years later and apparently died in Ireland. He was Deputy Treasurer of Ireland in 1413. In 1415 he was given leave to travel to England again: whether or not he did so is unclear. He and his wife were both still alive in 1416, and were still expanding their holdings with purchases of land in County Louth. The Richard Rede who with his wife Katherine was granted lands at Stackallen in 1424 may have been his son. Richard in turn sold lands to Robert Rede, son of Philip, who may have been a cousin, in 1427.

Legal offices
Preceded by Stephen de Bray	Lord Chief Justice of Ireland; 1404–1406	Succeeded by Stephen de Bray
