= William Tynbegh =

14th/15th-century Irish lawyer and judge

Lord Chief Justice of Ireland
- In office 1396–1397
- Preceded by: William Hankford
- Succeeded by: Peter Rowe

William Tynbegh or de Thinbegh (c. 1370–1424) was an Irish lawyer who had a long and distinguished career as a judge, holding office as Chief Justice of all three of the courts of common law and as Lord High Treasurer of Ireland. His career is unusual both for the exceptionally young age at which he became a judge, and because he left the Bench to become Attorney-General for Ireland, but later returned to judicial office.

He ordered the preparation of an Exchequer Issue Roll (i.e. the official record of payments out of the Irish Exchequer) for the year 1414 when he held the office of Deputy Treasurer. The Roll is of great value to historians for providing an account of a turbulent year in Irish politics and the personnel involved. It is one of the few official records of the time which was not destroyed in the Four Courts explosion of 1922.

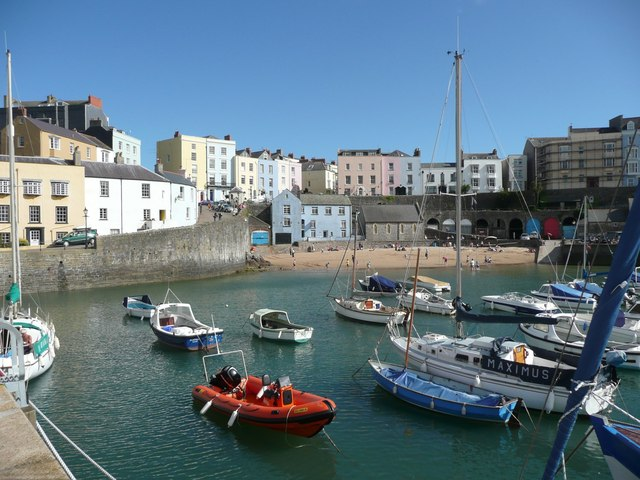
Tenby, Wales, where the Tynbegh family originated

== Early life ==
Tynbegh was born in Ireland to a family of Welsh origin: his surname derives from the town of Tenby in Pembrokeshire. The Nicholas Tynbegh to whom the Crown directed him to convey certain lands in County Meath in 1414 was presumably a member of the same family. In 1391 he received a license to study law in England, as did his future colleagues John Bermyngham and John Fitzadam.

== Early career ==
Somewhat surprisingly (since he can only have been called to the Bar a few years previously) Tynbegh was appointed Lord Chief Justice of the King's Bench for Ireland as early as 1396 and Chief Baron of the Irish Exchequer in 1397; he was probably still short of thirty. In 1400, in an act seemingly without precedent, he resigned from the Bench to become Attorney-General at a fee of £5 a year. The following year he was appointed one of the justices of the peace for Dublin. He is mentioned again as Chief Baron in 1405, when he apparently received a new patent of appointment "so long as he was of good behaviour". His salary was 20 marks a year, increased in 1408 to 30 marks. He had been appointed an extra justice in 1404 to sit on a bench of four judges to try an action for novel disseisin between Nicholas Crystor and the Stokes family. In 1407 he sat on an inquisition requested by the abbot of St. Mary's Abbey, Dublin, into the boundaries of the township of Kilternan, which belonged to the abbey. In 1410 he sat on another commission to determine what was owed to the Crown by the late rector of Swords, County Dublin. In 1408 and again in 1412 he received a royal commission to act as justice of the peace in Dublin and the adjoining counties. In 1409 he sat on a three-man commission to inquire into the export of foodstuffs from Ireland without a royal licence; he was then acting as Deputy Lord Treasurer.

== Exchequer Roll ==
Tynbegh acted as Deputy Treasurer again in 1414, as evidenced by the Exchequer Issue Roll for that year. It was compiled at Tynbegh's request. The Roll states that he was appointed Deputy Treasurer in the absence of Sir Laurence Merbury, who had gone to England on official business. The Roll gives a vivid account of the troubled state of Ireland under English rule in that year, and useful information on the members of the Royal Council.

== Later career ==
In the same year, he was one of five judges who heard a case of novel disseisin against the High Sheriff of Meath. He was Seneschal of County Wexford about 1413. He returned to the Court of Exchequer for a third term as Chief Baron in 1415, and was transferred to the Court of Common Pleas (Ireland) as Chief Justice in 1419. He apparently stepped down from the latter office but was reappointed in 1424, not long before his death. A royal writ dated 1424 refers to his appointment in the previous January, and orders that he be paid his arrears of salary.

In 1421 he persuaded the Crown to pardon Ralph Drake of Athboy, who had been declared an outlaw, not because of any notorious crime, but as a fairly common legal device in civil proceedings against a debtor. In the same year he sat on a commission with Reginald de Snyterby to try cases of treason in County Dublin.

== Landowner ==
In 1419 he was given custody of the lands at Stillorgan held by Robert Derpatrick, recently deceased, during the minority of Robert's brother and heir Stephen. He obtained a further grant of the estate on Stephen's death, although there was a female heir, Robert's daughter Alice. He apparently experienced some difficulty in establishing control of Derpatrick, which was also claimed by his long-term opponent, the Earl of Ormond, as in 1423 he was obliged to remind the Crown of the grant. The Crown accordingly made him a fresh grant of the lands.

In 1420 he witnessed the charter by which King Henry V guaranteed certain liberties and privileges to the Mayor and citizens of Dublin.

== Butler-Talbot feud ==
In the early stages of the Talbot-Butler feud, the clash between two powerful magnate families which dominated Irish public life for decades, Tynbegh was a member of the Talbot faction, headed by John Talbot, 1st Earl of Shrewsbury, and thus an opponent of James Butler, 4th Earl of Ormond. He was seen very much as a Talbot "client", and owed his career advancement largely to their patronage. Ormond as a result managed to have Tynbegh dismissed from the Bench, but after Tynbegh's return to office in his last years, they were able to work together amicably, apart from pursuing their rival claims to Stillorgan.

He spent some time in France in 1420–21. He was appointed Treasurer of Ireland in 1421, having regularly served as Deputy Treasurer. He was still living in March 1424, when he ordered the Archbishop of Dublin to make a grant of the lands formerly owned by Thomas Leger to Richard Vale; but he died later the same year.

Legal offices
| Preceded by William Hankford | Lord Chief Justice of Ireland; 1396–1397 | Succeeded by Peter Rowe |
