= William Cheyne (judge) =

English lawyer and Chief Justice of the King's Bench

Sir William Cheyne (died 1443) was an English lawyer, and Chief Justice of the King's Bench from 1424 until 1438. He has been described as "one of the most obscure chief justices of the late medieval period".

== Life ==
Though he is assumed to have been born between 1370 and 1380, his parentage is not known. The situation is complicated by the roughly contemporary existence of at least two other men by the name of William Cheyne: Sir William Cheyne of Brooke, Wiltshire (d. 1420), and William Cheyne of Shurland, Kent (d. 1441) This William Cheyne came from Sussex, and it is here that he makes his first appearance in the record, as a Justice and the Peace and commissioner of that county from 1406 onwards. His career was advanced through the patronage of Thomas FitzAlan, Earl of Arundel; he was one of the executors of the earl's will in 1415.

In 1412 he was created a serjeant-at-law. At the time this was an unpopular position, due to the high cost of the creations ceremony, and the Crown had to admonish the nominees to take up the position, on pain of being debarred. Cheyne was appointed justice of the King's Bench on 16 June 1415, and was reappointed in 1422, on the accession of Henry VI. Two years later, on 23 January 1424, he was promoted to Chief Justice, on the death of the incumbent William Hankford. He retired in 1438, probably due to poor health.

William Cheyne was married twice; possibly three times. His first wife, of whom there is no certainty, was supposedly a Margaret who died in 1419. In 1420 he married Joan, with whom he had two children, John and Margaret. Joan died in 1434. His last wife was another Margaret, who survived him by a few months. He died in 1443 and left his possessions – £400 and lands in Sussex and Dorset valued at £80 per annum – to his son John. Cheyne was buried in the church of St Benet Paul's Wharf in London.

== Sources ==
Rigg, James McMullen (1887). "Cheyne, William" . In Stephen, Leslie (ed.). Dictionary of National Biography. Vol. 10. London: Smith, Elder & Co.

Legal offices
Preceded by William Hankford	Lord Chief Justice; 1424–1438	Succeeded by John Juyn
