= John Penros =

Cornish lawyer and judge

John Penros or Penrose (died 1411) was a Cornish lawyer and judge who held high office as Lord Chief Justice of Ireland, and subsequently served as a High Court judge in England and Wales. Despite his professional eminence, he was guilty of "an extraordinary career of crime" which stretched over nearly thirty years. When the charges against him were eventually proven, he was removed from the Bench.

He belonged to a landowning family based at Escalls near Land's End in Cornwall. He was a qualified advocate, and apparently a good one, as his name appears frequently in the Law Reports in the early 1380s. However he quickly became notorious as a law-breaker. Along with his associates John Trevarthian senior (died 1395), and his son Sir John Trevarthian junior (died 1405) he was for many years one of the principal disturbers of the peace in Cornwall. He had at least one brother Joss, who also seems to have been a malefactor, though in a much smaller way.

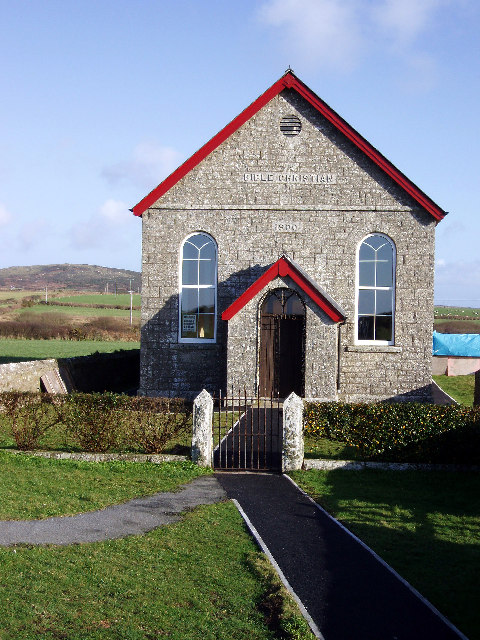
Escalls, present day

What was later described as his "remarkable career of crime" began about 1370. In 1383 he was indicted in Surrey for his role in the murder of Richard Eyre, a fellow Cornishman whose family had a long-standing feud with the Trevarthians. The following year an arrest warrant on the charge of murder was issued for his apprehension but was later withdrawn, apparently on the ground that he was not the principal actor in the murder. The list of serious crimes of which the Trevarthians were accused, and to which Penrose, his brother Joss and his cousin Michael Trereise were accessories, grew to a remarkable length: it included their private war with the Eyre family, which had resulted in the murder of Richard Eyre in 1383, as well as piracy, burglary and treason. In time, however, the Trevarthian family became wealthy and respectable: at the time of his death in 1405 Sir John Trevarthian junior was Under Sheriff of Cornwall.

Despite his appalling criminal record, Penrose was sent to Ireland as Lord Chief Justice in 1385. He landed at Dalkey, near Dublin, in late September, and was still in office in March 1386, when the Close Rolls refer to a payment of £20 to him as his half years salary. While he was in Ireland his conduct as a judge was subject to serious criticism. He returned without permission to England later in 1386 and as a result, was accused of misconduct. Again he seems to have escaped serious censure, despite his reputation as "a notorious criminal". In 1391 he was appointed a justice of the King's Bench. In 1391, he was arrested following an intriguing case in the Court of the King's Bench. Peter Trelewhit had accused William Eyre and Ralph Treskulard of intending to murder John Penros. Before a panel of judges that included the Lord Chancellor, the Keeper of the Privy Seal and Chief Baron of the Exchequer, Trelewhit confessed to making the accusation after being incited into doing so by Penros. The fate of Penros is unclear but subsequently became Justiciar of South Wales in 1393. He was a trier of petitions in the House of Commons in 1394, but was eventually removed from the Bench on the ground of his record as a notorious criminal (meanwhile the career of his accomplice Sir John Trevarthian junior was flourishing).

Penros married firstly Joan, daughter of Richard Carnver, who died about 1391, and secondly, in about 1395, Constance, of whom little is known. With Joan he had at least two sons, William and John; John is said to have been an "imbecile from birth". Penros died in 1411.

Legal offices
Preceded by John de Sotheron	Lord Chief Justice of the King's Bench for Ireland; 1385–1386	Succeeded by Edmund de Clay
