= Edmund de Clay =

English-born lawyer and judge

Edmund de Clay, or del Clay (died after 1389) was an English-born lawyer and judge who served as Lord Chief Justice of Ireland and Chief Justice of the Irish Common Pleas.

He was born in Nottinghamshire, and later became a landowner there. By 1383, he had the reputation for being a man "learned in the law", and in that year he became Serjeant-at-law at the English bar. He is known to have been most reluctant to take up this office, probably because it would involve him in heavy expenses, and he did so only after King Richard II issued a warrant commanding de Clay, along with two other leading advocates, John Hill and Sir John Cary, to be admitted to that rank by a specified day.

In 1385 he was sent to Ireland with a large retinue to take up office as Lord Chief Justice of the Common Pleas, to which he was appointed in February. He and John Giffard, later to be his successor as Chief Justice, were appointed Justices in eyre (itinerant justices) for Carlow, Kildare and Wexford in the same year. They were also appointed to a Commission of Oyer and Terminer to deal with all treasons and felonies in Dublin and the Pale. (The Patent Roll calls his colleague Richard Gyffard, but John is clearly meant). The Crown authorised an extra payment of £14 to him for the cost of sitting on the commission of oyer and terminer.

De Clay was a member of the Privy Council of Ireland, and was summoned to the Council meeting in September 1386 when Sir John Stanley, the new Lord Lieutenant of Ireland, read out his letters patent of appointment. He had been transferred to the more senior office of Lord Chief Justice of Ireland earlier that year. He returned to England before 1389, when he was living on his estates in Nottinghamshire; later he is recorded as sitting on a commission of oyer and terminer. His date of death is not recorded.

Legal offices
Preceded by John Penros	Lord Chief Justice of the King's Bench for Ireland; 1386–1388	Succeeded by Richard Plunkett
