= John Brettan =

Irish judge and Crown official

John Brettan or Breton (died after 1382) was an Irish judge and Crown official. His petitions to the Irish Privy Council, of which he wrote five between 1376 and 1382, and which have survived (there were others, now lost); cast a valuable light on the disturbed condition of English-ruled Ireland in the late fourteenth century, and especially the situation in Carlow, his home town, which was the effective seat of English government in the latter half of the fourteenth century.

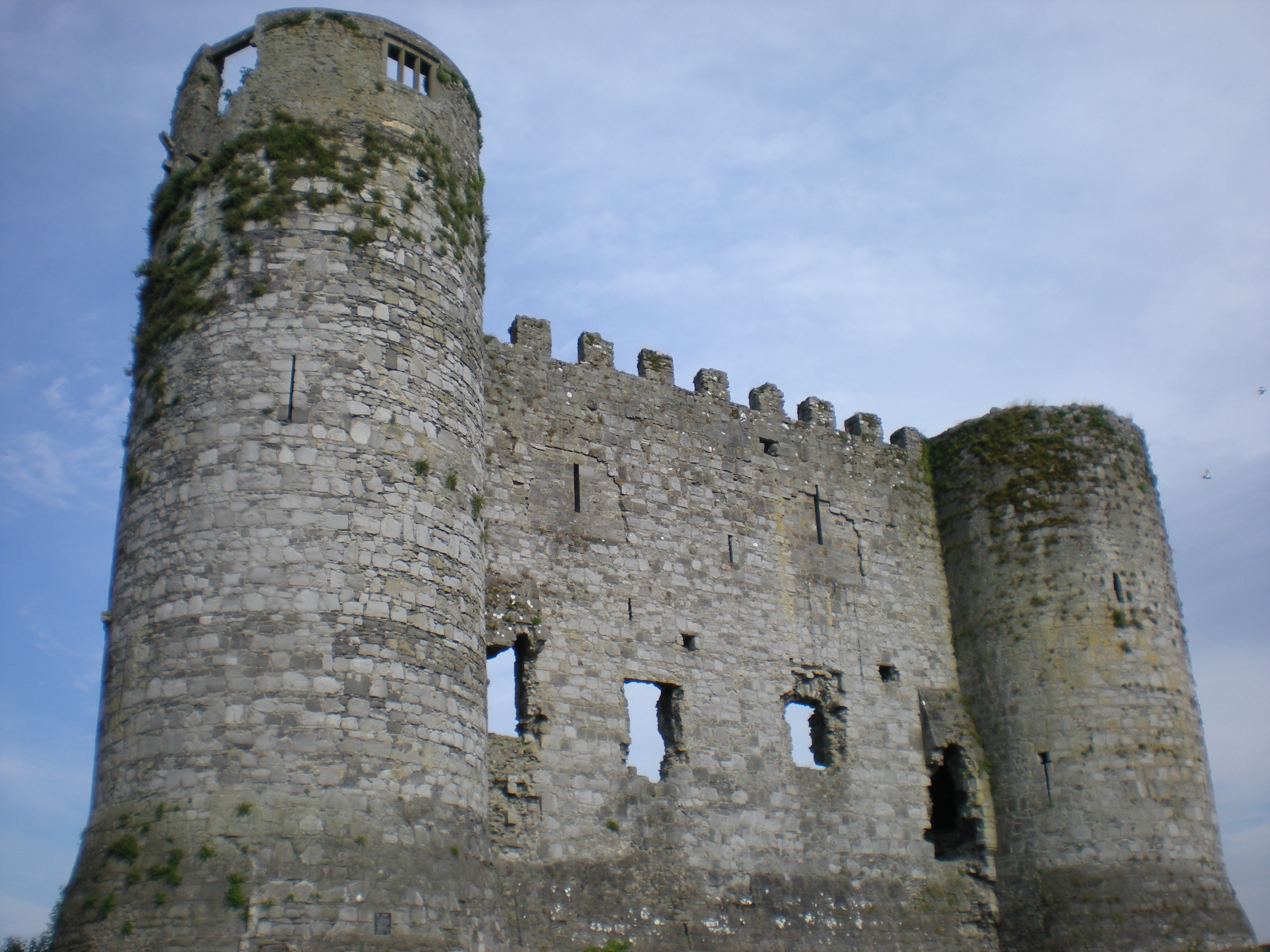
Carlow Castle. Carlow was Brettan's hometown, and for a time the effective centre of English rule in Ireland

== Career ==
His family name is English: it is generally thought to be derived from Breton, and was occasionally spelt that way. He was born in Carlow town and lived there for most of his life.

He is first heard of in 1358, when he was one of three leading citizens of the town (the others being the High Sheriff of Carlow, William Valle, and Brother John, a monk of Killergy Abbey) who were entrusted with organising the defence of Carlow against the imminent threat from the Irish of Leinster to burn it: "which God forbid!", in the words of the Patent Rolls. An Irish confederacy had assembled "a great army", burnt the towns near Carlow and driven off cattle, without any opposition. The three citizens were given a commission of array, to muster the inhabitants of the town and put them in a proper condition for war. The defence of Carlow from raids by the Irish of Leinster was to be a preoccupation of Brettan throughout his career. Whether he had any military training, as commissioners of array usually did, is unclear. The Commission's defence of the town seems to have been successful in the short term, and Carlow suffered no major attack until 1363.

In 1359, though he was not yet a judge, he sat with John de Rednesse, the Lord Chief Justice of Ireland, to hear a case of novel disseisin between Thomas Norragh and John l'Enfaunt.

In 1369 he was appointed a Baron (judge) of the Court of Exchequer (Ireland) and Chief Remembrancer of the Exchequer of Ireland (the Court and the Government department also called the Exchequer were not then fully distinct). The Remembrancer's principal task was to draw up the memorandum rolls to "remind" the Barons of pending cases. As such it was rather unusual for one man to act as both Baron and Remembrancer. He received a fee of 100 shillings a year as Remembrancer.

== The Courts in Carlow ==
Both the Exchequer and the Court of Common Pleas (Ireland) had moved from Dublin to Carlow in 1361, as Carlow was closer to the centre of the Pale (that part of Ireland which was under secure English rule). Dublin by contrast was near the border of the Pale and was frequently raided by hostile Irish clans from County Wicklow (Norman Ireland had no capital city or central seat of government as such). However the Courts returned to Dublin in 1393, as Carlow had become as dangerous as Dublin: it was subject to frequent attack by Irish clans, and was burnt on at least three occasions, in 1363, 1376 and 1391-2, with heavy casualties in the 1376 attack. Brettan himself had helped organise the defence of Carlow against a similar threat of attack in 1358. The Exchequer had already moved back to Dublin temporarily in the 1360s. William de Karlell, another of the Barons, was sitting in Carlow in 1374, when he complained to the Crown that his horse had been stolen, and received compensation for the theft.

== His petition of 1376 ==
A petition from Brettan to the English Crown in 1376 speaks eloquently of the dangers of living and working in Carlow. He wrote that he had "continued the pleas of the Court (of Exchequer) in diverse places", and journeyed to the town of Carlow "where the Exchequer was", even in time of war when the other Barons dared not go there. In addition, he wrote that he had served as Remembrancer for many years at his own expense with no salary or other rewards from the Crown "to his immense charge". Brettan, a native of the town, had a house in Carlow, which was burnt, along with most of his possessions, "to his manifest impoverishment" in the recent destruction of the town by the Irish of Leinster. This was a reference to the attack of 1376, in which there were heavy casualties; there had been other raids, including a very serious one in 1363. The Crown granted him 100 shillings by way of compensation.

This and two later surviving petitions suggest that he was a hard-working and conscientious official: by his own account (which is perfectly plausible, given the times he lived in) at times he was the only Exchequer judge sitting in Carlow. Having been entrusted with the defence of the town as early as 1358, he was no doubt something of an expert on attacks by the Irish. It should be said that another Baron of the Exchequer, John de Shriggeley, did manage to hold the assizes in Carlow for several terms in 1382-5, and received two extra payments of 10 marks each as a result.

== Later career – further petitions ==
In 1377 he petitioned for reimbursement of the cost of his horse, whose value he put at 100 shillings. The horse was lost at Youghal, where he had travelled "on the King's business", as he attempted to cross the River Blackwater on his own, apparently because he was unable to pay the toll to the ferryman. The Council, being satisfied as to the truth of the claim, granted him 5 marks compensation. On the other hand, it refused his request to cross to England to report on his official business in Cork to King Edward III and the English Privy Council: their reasons for this refusal are unclear.

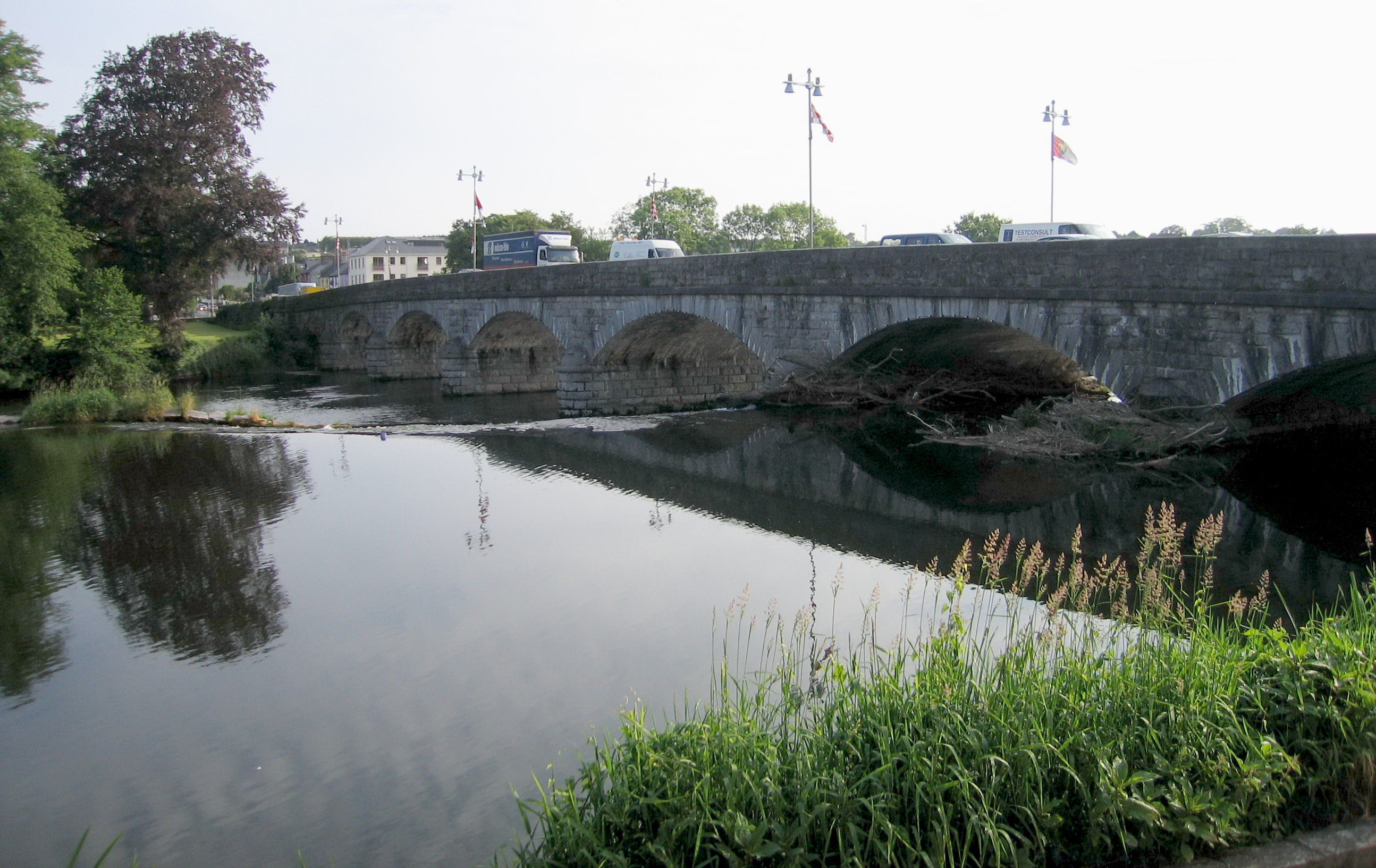
River Blackwater, Cork

In 1378 he was awarded a further 100 shillings for his services to the Crown in levying and collecting debts in Leinster, thereby according to his own account gaining much profit for the Crown.

His fourth and fifth surviving petitions to the King and Council in 1381 and 1382 are almost identical in content, except that Thomas Bache, the Chancellor of the Exchequer of Ireland, and Richard Walsh, Chamberlain of the Exchequer, joined in the 1381 petition. Both state that Brettan in his capacity as Remembrancer had been employed to levy the King's debts in seven counties of Munster and Leinster over a six-month period in 1381-1382, at great expense and labour, without any reward. On foot of the petition of 1381 Brettan and Walsh were awarded £4 (Bache got slightly more). On foot of the petition of 1382, King Richard II, being yet again satisfied by the Council of the truth of his claim, awarded him 40 marks compensation. Brettan himself refers to several petitions on the subject to the Justiciar of Ireland where his claims for compensation were upheld and payment ordered, but he was unable to prove these claims as the petitions had been lost.

The details of his subsequent career are unknown. John Brekdene (also called Brakden or Brecden) replaced him as Remembrancer of the Exchequer on an unspecified date, and held that office until 1386 when he became a Baron for the second time, having first been appointed "during pleasure" in 1368.

Thomas Taillour replaced Brekdene as Remembrancer. Taillour, then a royal clerk, was like Brettan living in Carlow during the Irish attack of 1376, "at the first killing of the men of Carlow", and he also petitioned the Crown for redress. He apparently died in 1407, having stepped down as Remembrancer in 1392, when Thomas Gower succeeded him.

== Sources ==
- Ball, F. Elrington The Judges in Ireland 1221-1921 London John Murray 1926
- Otway-Ruthven A.J. A History of Medieval Ireland Barnes and Noble reissue New York 1993
- Smyth, Constantine Joseph Chronicle of the Law Officers of Ireland London Butterworths 1839
- Close Rolls and Patent Rolls Edward III
- Close Rolls and Patent Rolls Richard II
