= William Hankford =

English lawyer (c. 1350 – 1423)

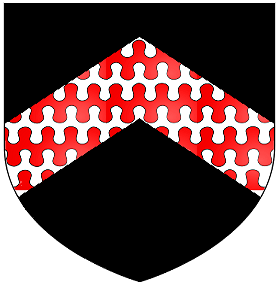
Arms of Hankford of Annery, Devon: Sable, a chevron barry nebuly argent and gules

Sir William Hankford (c. 1350 – 1423), also written Hankeford, of Annery in Devon, was an English lawyer who acted as Chief Justice of the King's Bench from 1413 until 1423.

== Origins ==
Born about 1350, he came from a minor gentry family who took their name from their estate of Hankford, near Bulkworthy in the Devon parish of Buckland Brewer. The names of his parents are unknown, and he had a younger brother named John who died before him.

== Career ==
Educated at the Middle Temple and then practising law, from 1388 he was retained as counsel by the Earl of Devon. Appointed a serjeant-at-law in that year, he was raised to king's serjeant in 1389. In addition to pleading in the central courts at London, he acted as a royal judge in many provincial courts around southern England. In 1394 he accompanied King Richard II to Ireland, where he apparently served as Lord Chief Justice of the King's Bench for Ireland from 1395 to 1396.

In 1398 he was one of the judges asked by Richard II to pronounce on the validity of the opinions given in 1387 by the judges who decided that the actions of the Lords Appellant were unlawful and treasonable. He declared that the responses were sound and loyal and that he would have given the same answers himself. Shortly after, he was appointed to succeed his friend Sir John Wadham as Justice of the Court of Common Pleas.

When King Henry IV replaced Richard II in 1399, he reappointed Hankford to the bench and at his coronation made him a Knight of the Bath. In the following years he was active as a judge and royal commissioner, at times also attending Parliament and the Privy Council. On the accession of King Henry V in 1413, he replaced Sir William Gascoigne as Chief Justice of the King's Bench, an appointment that was renewed under King Henry VI in 1422.

He died on 12 December 1423 and was buried in Monkleigh church, which he had largely rebuilt, where his ornate Easter Sepulchre monument survives in the south wall of the Annery Chapel. A legend claims that he had ordered his gamekeeper to shoot intruders on sight and that, wandering in his woods at night, he was shot dead. As the same tale is told of another Chief Justice of the Common Pleas, Sir Robert Danby who died 51 years later in 1474, it seems improbable that two heads of the English judiciary should die in the same unusual way in the same century. In his will made two days before his death, in addition to family bequests (including provision for the education of two illegitimate grandsons), he left generous sums to churches, charities, and religious foundations in North Devon. Sir William Cheyne, his successor as Chief Justice, was one of his executors.

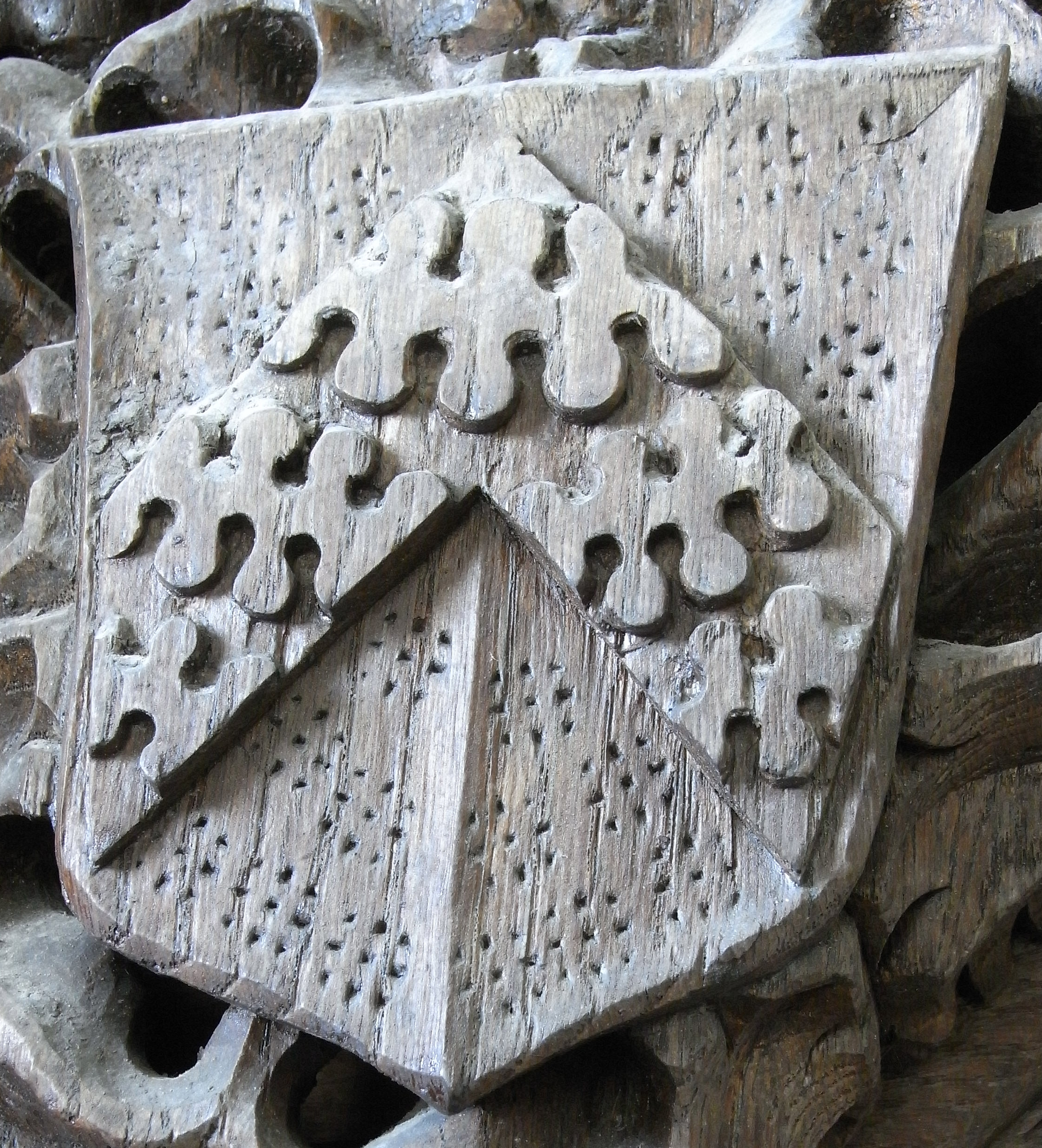
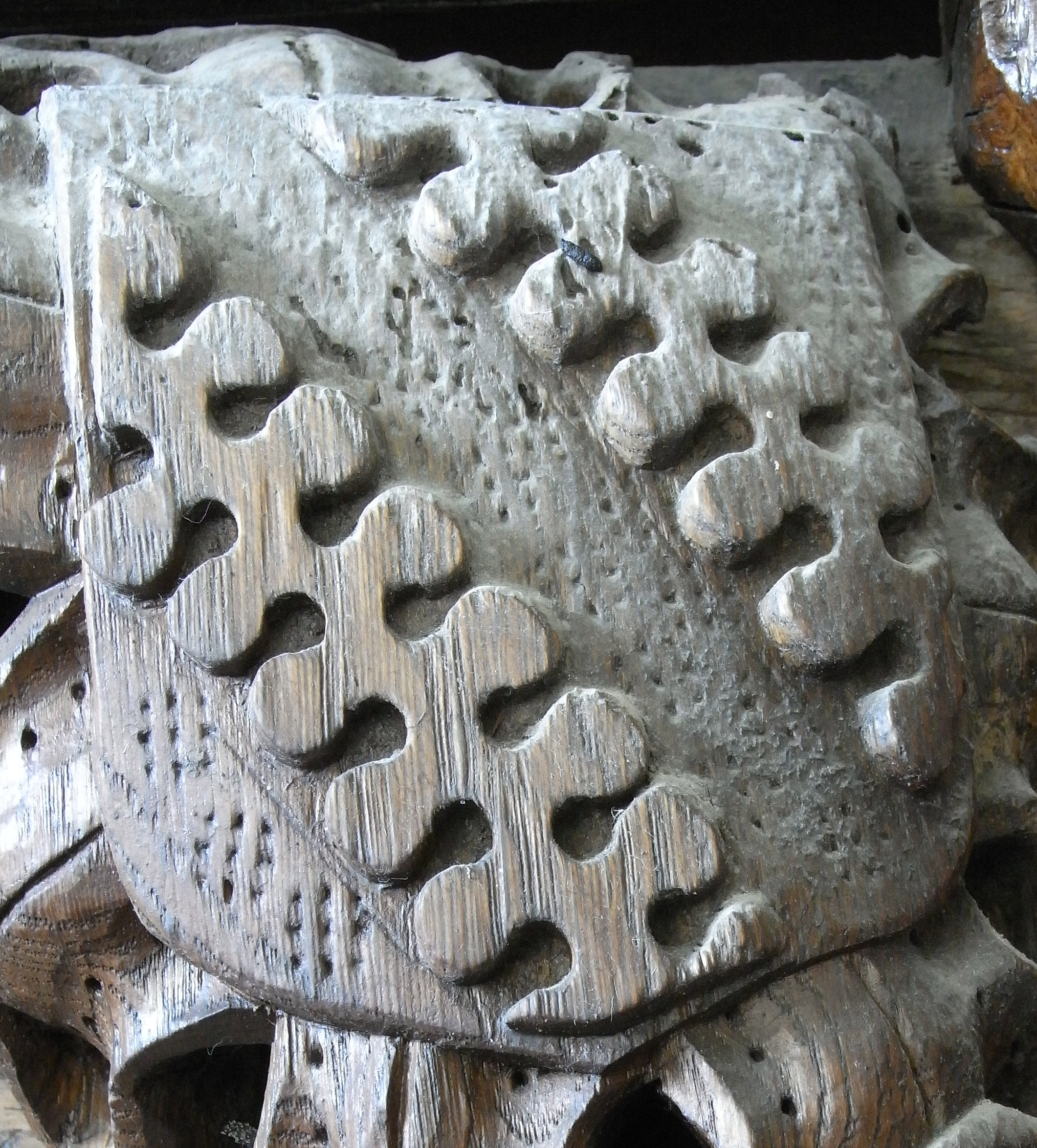
Pair of sculpted heraldic escutcheons in spandrels of arches in doors of mediaeval wooden screen at west end of Annery chapel, Monkleigh church

== Family ==
By 1380 he had married Christine, who died before him and whose parents are unknown. Their son was:

- Richard Hankford (died 1419), twice MP for Devon, who with his wife Thomasine Stapleton was father of:
  - Sir Richard Hankford (died 1431), who became his grandfather's heir in 1423.
  - Jane Hankford (died 1448), who married, as his second wife, Sir Robert Cary (died about 1431). Having no children from this marriage, in 1433 she then married Sir Theobald Gorges (died 1470) and had three children with him.

== See also ==
- Prince, John, (1643–1723), The Worthies of Devon, 1810 edition, pp. 458–462, biography of Sir William Hankford.

Legal offices
Preceded by Peter Rowe	Lord Chief Justice of Ireland; 1395–1396	Succeeded by William Tynbegh
Preceded by William Gascoigne	Lord Chief Justice of England; 1413–1423	Succeeded by William Cheyne
