= Stephen de Bray =

Irish judge (died 1440/1)

Lord Chief Justice of Ireland
- In office 1397–1404
- Preceded by: Peter Rowe
- Succeeded by: Richard Rede
- In office 1406–1426
- Preceded by: Richard Rede
- Succeeded by: Henry Fortescue
- In office 1429–1435
- Preceded by: Henry Fortescue
- Succeeded by: Christopher Bernevall

Personal details
- Born: Ireland (probably Bray, County Wicklow)
- Died: 1440 or 1441 Ireland
- Spouse: Katherine
- Occupation: Judge
- Profession: Law
- Held office intermittently for 38 years; issued writs of novel disseisin and participated in numerous judicial inquiries.

Stephen de Bray (died 1440 or 1441) was an Irish judge, who was notable for his lengthy tenure as Lord Chief Justice of Ireland.

He was probably the son of the elder Stephen de Bray who also held high judicial office in Ireland, being appointed Chief Baron of the Irish Exchequer in 1376 and Chief Justice of the Irish Common Pleas in 1380. Little is known of their background, although the family name suggests that they came from Bray, County Wicklow.

Not much is known of the younger Stephen's career until 1397 when he was appointed Lord Chief Justice. At the same time he was appointed a member of the council which advised Roger Mortimer, 4th Earl of March, the Lord Deputy of Ireland. In 1403 the Crown gave him the crucial power to issue writs of novel disseisin and other important writs, in those parts of Ireland which were so remote from the Chancery that it was not feasible to affix the Great Seal of Ireland to them. In 1404 his patent of office was renewed in the presence of the Privy Council of Ireland.

McGee calls him "one of the wisest statesmen of the Pale". This verdict is borne out by the fact that, with two short intervals, he held the office of Lord Chief Justice for 38 years. In 1407, it appears that John Bermyngham was nominated to succeed him, but this was clearly against Bray's wishes since he succeeded in blocking Bermyngham's appointment, and remained in office for the next 25 years: the Crown ordered that he receive "the same fees and wages as before". The two judges sat together that year on an inquisition requested by the abbot of St. Mary's Abbey, Dublin into the boundaries of the township of Kilternan, which was part of the abbey's lands.

In 1422 the Crown granted him wardship of a very wealthy minor, Thomas Marward, Baron Skryne, whose father, also Thomas, had been killed a few years earlier.

Another glimpse we have of him in his official role is in 1432, when he and his fellow Chief Justice John Blakeney were appointed with two other judges to hear a case of novel disseisin concerning lands in The Curragh, County Kildare.

He retired in 1435, when he must have been well advanced in years, and died in 1440 or 1441. After his death his widow Katherine was embroiled in litigation with James Butler, 4th Earl of Ormond, whom she accused of withholding monies due to her. The details of the lawsuit are hard for a modern reader to follow, but it was considered serious enough to be referred to the Privy Council of England, probably because Katherine's cause was supported by Ormond's numerous political enemies. Separately the Irish Privy Council ordered payment to Katherine of the substantial arrears of salary owed to her late husband.

Legal offices
Preceded by Peter Rowe	Lord Chief Justice of Ireland; 1397–1404	Succeeded by Richard Rede
Preceded by Richard Rede	Lord Chief Justice of Ireland; 1406–1426	Succeeded by Henry Fortescue
Preceded by Henry Fortescue	Lord Chief Justice of Ireland; 1429–1435	Succeeded by Christopher Bernevall
