= Thomas Fitzadam =

Irish administrator and judge (died post-1223)

Sir Thomas Fitzadam (died after 1223) was a leading Irish administrator and judge during the reigns of King John and his son Henry III of England. He held a wide variety of official positions, including military commander, Constable of Dublin Castle, Chief Escheator of Ireland and Chief Forester of the Royal Forest of Glencree. He was one of the first three judges to be appointed an itinerant justice in Ireland.

== Life ==
He is first heard of in 1210. He and his brother Richard were Irish by birth, and it is possible that one or the other was the ancestor of John Fitzadam (died c.1419), the long-serving Lord Chief Justice of Ireland, who came from an old Dublin family.

He was in attendance on King John on his expedition to Ireland in 1210, and was a commander in the army which drove the rebellious nobles Walter de Lacy, Lord of Meath and his father-in-law William de Braose, north into Ulster. He regularly visited England to advise the King on Irish matters, and received a knighthood. In 1213 he was made Constable of Dublin Castle, and later became Constable of Trim Castle (1215) and Athlone Castle (1223).

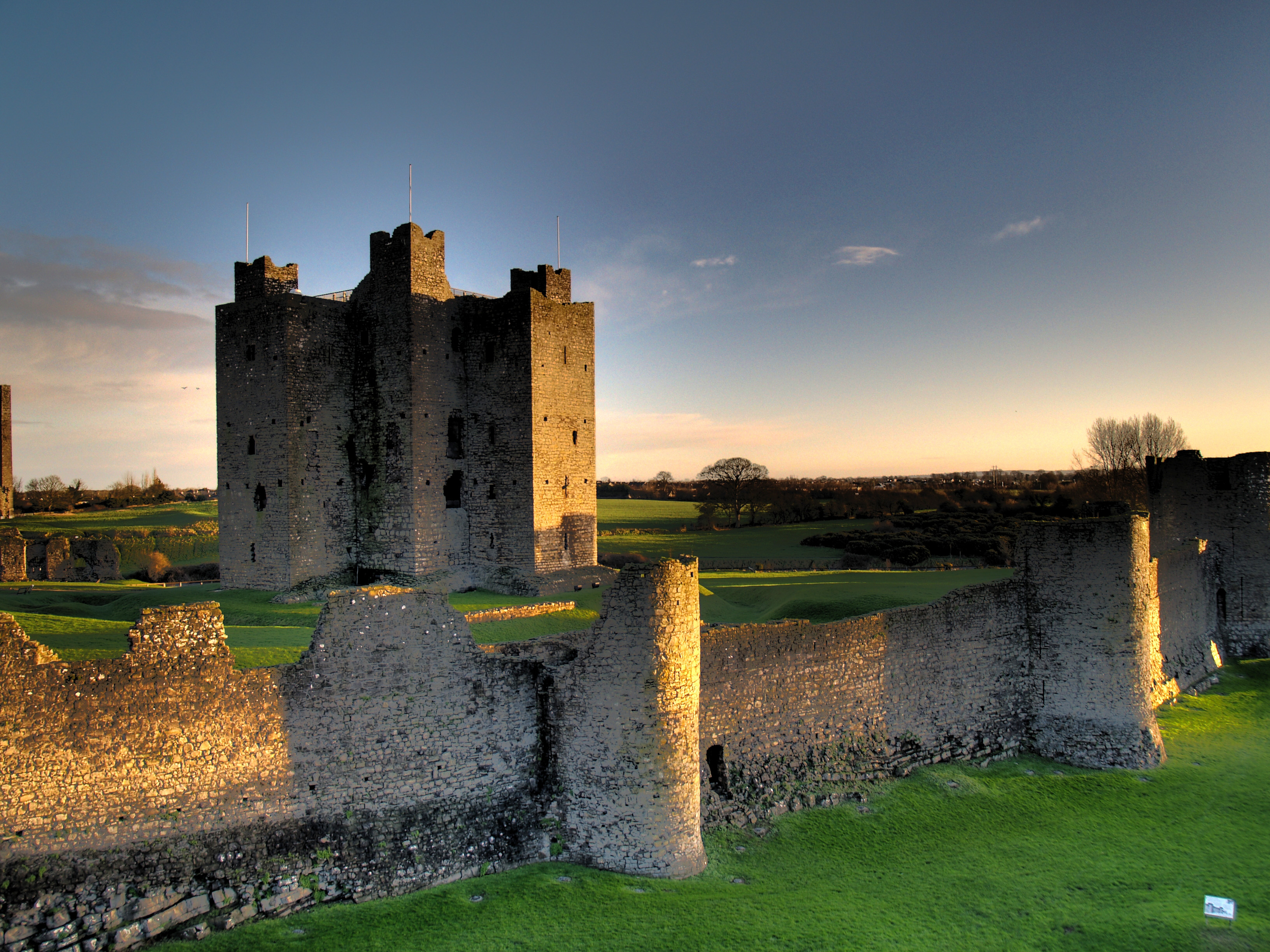
Trim Castle: Thomas was Constable of Trim Castle in 1215

In 1217 the Crown ordered Geoffrey de Marisco, the Justiciar of Ireland, to help Thomas fortify his castle at "Corcobasky Ethragh" (Corkobasky was probably modern Kilkee) in County Clare, which had been granted to him in about 1212/3 by the previous Justiciar John de Grey, Bishop of Norwich. In 1220 he received other lands in County Dublin at Chapelizod, and at Rathsallagh, Castleknock, to hold at the King's pleasure at a rent of 100 shillings a year. These lands had previously been held by Thomas's judicial colleague Richard de la Feld, who died in 1220.

In 1218 he was appointed Chief Escheator for Ireland. He was clearly an able and conscientious official, and later that year he was able to send £500 to the English Exchequer. He engaged in litigation on the Crown's behalf against Henry de Loundres, the Archbishop of Dublin, in 1220. He continued to visit England to advise the youthful King Henry and his Council on Irish affairs.

In 1219 he was named as Chief Royal Forester of the Irish forests: in fact Glencree in the Wicklow Mountains seems to have been the only Irish royal forest at this time, and was sometimes referred to as "the forest in Ireland". A letter in his official capacity, in which he is described as Justiciar of the Royal Forest, to Ralph de Neville from 1219 is now in the National Archives. It concerns a dispute over pasture rights in the forest with the Archbishop of Dublin: this dispute was presumably the subject of the subsequent litigation.

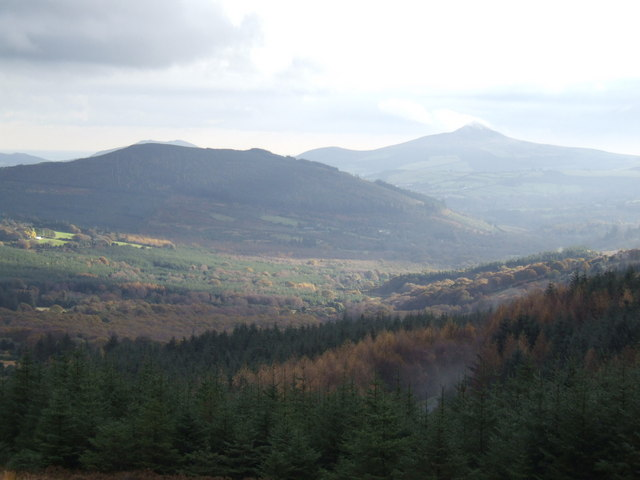
Glencree: Thomas was keeper of the royal forest

In 1221 he was the second justice itinerant: this seems to be the first reference to the eyre (circuit) system in Ireland. We have the name of the third justice, the cleric Bartholemew de Camera, parson of Limerick Chapel, but the name of the senior justice is missing (the earliest reference to a first justice seems to be seven years later). Otway-Ruthven states that Thomas had in fact been acting as a judge for some time previously, and that the reforms of 1221 amounted not to the creation of a new system, but a reform of the existing procedures. The main reform was that the three justices would sit together as a bench.

Thomas was still alive at the end of 1223, when he sent his servant Lawrence to England on Crown business. The next appointment to the Irish Bench seems to have been John Marshal, Baron of Hingham, a nephew of the wealthy and influential noble William Marshal, who became senior justice itinerant in 1228. In the same year Sir Richard Duket, a long-serving English-born Exchequer official who also had experience as an itinerant justice and as a diplomat, was appointed second justice, which suggests that Thomas had recently died or retired.

== Sources ==
- Ball, F. Elrington The Judges in Ireland 1221-1921 London John Murray 1926
- Empey, C A. The Settlement of the Kingdom of Limerick Irish Academic Press 1981
- Foss, Edward The Judges of England London Longman Brown Green and Longmans 1848
- National Archives SC 1/6/11 Thomas fitz Adam, justiciar of the Forest in Ireland to Ralph de Neville
- Otway-Ruthven, A.J. History of Medieval Ireland New York Barnes and Noble reissue 1993
- Sweetman, H.S. (ed.) Calendar of Documents Relating to Ireland 5 volumes reprinted 1974
