= Escalls =

Coordinates: 50.085°N 5.683°W

Escalls: Cornish: Heskals
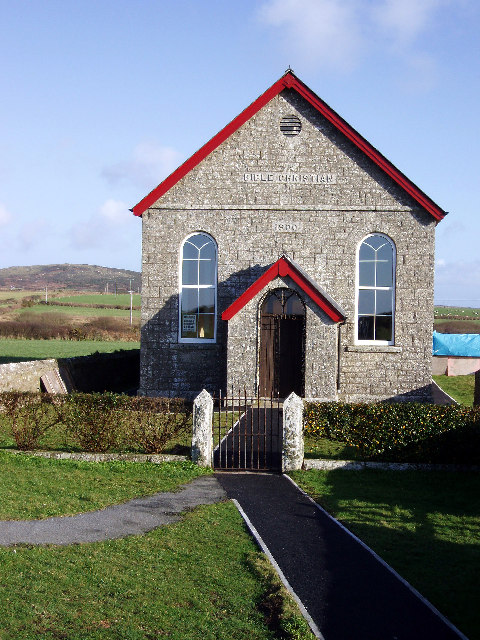
- Escalls chapel

- Location within Cornwall
- Civil parish: Sennen
- Unitary authority: Cornwall
- Ceremonial county: Cornwall
- Region: South West
- Country: England
- Sovereign state: United Kingdom
- Post town: Penzance
- Postcode district: TR19
- Dialling code: 01736
- Police: Devon and Cornwall
- Fire: Cornwall
- Ambulance: South Western
- UK Parliament: St Ives

Escalls (Cornish: Heskals, meaning sawgrass cliff) is a hamlet in the civil parish of Sennen on the Penwith peninsula in west Cornwall, England, UK.

== Toponyny ==
Escalls previously written as Heskels (in 1280 and 1481), Eskeles (1281) and Eskels (1296); possibly from hesk als meaning sedge cliff in the Cornish language.

== Geography ==
Escalls is in the civil parish of Sennen approximately 2 miles (3.2 km) north-east of Land's End and 1 mile (1.6 km) north-east of Sennen Churchtown. To the south of the hamlet of Escalls is Escalls Green, to the north is Escalls Moor and west of the moor is Escalls Cliff and Whitesand Bay. The South West Coast Path follows the coast of Whitesand Bay crossing Escalls Cliff. Most of the houses are now holiday homes or let to visitors.

Escalls Methodist Chapel (grid reference SW371268) was formerly a Bible Christian chapel and is on the nearby A30 road.

== History ==
Escalls Cross (grid reference SW361267) is a roughly-hewn granite cross with a damaged wheel head, probably dating to before 1066. It was formerly at Escalls Farm and is now in nearby Sunny Corner Lane.

In the Middle Ages Escalls was owned by the Penros family. The best-known member of the family, John Penros (died 1411) was Lord Chief Justice of Ireland in 1385–86, despite being a notorious felon. His litany of serious crimes, including treason, piracy and murder (technically he was only an accessory to the murder) ultimately led to his downfall, although his descendants remained at Escalls for some generations.

At the time of the English Civil War there were a number of families who were members of the Society of Friends (Quakers), and there is a Quaker burial ground (grid reference SW376273) at the parish boundary with St Just. One family that was active with the Quakers was the Vyngow's, now spelt Vingoe. Digory Vingoe owned land in the parish and bought land at Escalls in 1655 from Sir John Arundel. By 1838 there are about twenty landowners listed on the Sennen Tithe Apportionment Map with land at Escalls. Those with the most land were Richard Botheras, John Humphreys, John Vincoe, William Vingoe and Sir John St Aubyn. Most of the land was described as arable.
