= William de Skipwith =

English judge

William de Skipwith (died after 1392) was a fourteenth-century English judge, who also served as a judge in Ireland. He held the office of Chief Baron of the Exchequer 1362-5. He suffered temporary disgrace when he was removed from office for corruption, but he was restored to favour, became Lord Chief Justice of Ireland 1370-2, and later returned to the English bench. He appears to have been the only High Court judge to have escaped impeachment by the English Parliament of 1388.

== Family ==
He was the younger son of William de Skipwith and Margaret Fitzsimon. The Skipwiths came from Skipwith in North Yorkshire: the family was descended from Robert de Stuteville, lord of the manor of Skipwith in the reign of Henry III; the Fitzsimons were from Ormsby in Lincolnshire, where the de Skipwiths later settled. On the death of his elder brother, William inherited the family estates.

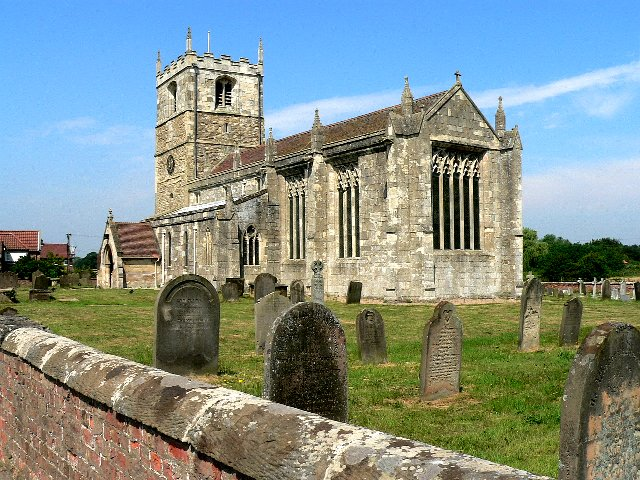
St. Helen's Church, Skipwith

== Early career ==
He was probably educated at Gray's Inn. He became Sergeant-at-law in 1354 and was knighted and made a justice of the Court of Common Pleas in 1359. In 1360 he sat on a judicial commission in Northumberland to inquire into serious allegations against Sir Adam de Heton and his associates of murder, felony and trespasses. He became Chief Baron of the Exchequer in 1362, and a trier of petitions in Parliament.

== Disgrace and return ==
In 1365 Skipwith and the Lord Chief Justice, Henry Green, were removed from office for having acted "contrary to law and justice", and having unlawfully obtained large sums of money. Green never held office again, but Skipwith was only in temporary disgrace. In 1370 he was appointed Lord Chief Justice of Ireland and received 40 marks to cover his expenses. In 1372 he was on an assize in Kilkenny, hearing a complex inheritance dispute, and 1373 he is recorded as sitting on a commission of gaol delivery in Dublin. In 1376 he was restored to his old seat on the Court of Common Pleas in England, and remained in office until 1388. He regularly appeared in Parliament as a trier of petitions and sat on various judicial commissions.

== Merciless Parliament ==
When Richard II summoned the High Court judges in August 1387 to give their opinion on the lawfulness of the actions of the powerful commission of nobles known as the Lords Appellant, Skipwith pleaded illness as an excuse for non-attendance. As a result, he avoided participating in the judgment against the Lords Appellant, condemning them for treason and authorising their arrest, which the judges later claimed they had been coerced into giving. His decision not to attend was a wise one since when the judges were impeached by the Merciless Parliament in 1388, Skipwith escaped censure (his son-in-law Sir Robert Constable was an MP in that session, and no doubt he had other supporters). He and his eldest son swore to uphold the Lords Appellant. He retired from the Bench soon afterwards. He was still living in 1392: his date of death is uncertain.

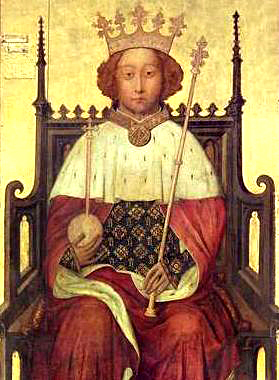
King Richard II, who presided in person over the Merciless Parliament

== Descendants ==
He married Alice de Hiltoft of Ingoldmells, Lincolnshire. They had two surviving sons, William, who died without issue, and John (died 1422), ancestor of the Skipwith Baronets of Metheringham. They had several daughters, including Margaret, who married firstly Alexander Surtees of North Gosforth (died 1380). Secondly, before 1384, Sir Robert Constable of Flamborough (died 1400), MP for Yorkshire in 1388. Margaret had issue by both her marriages. Since she remarried without the required royal licence for a widow's remarriage, Constable was obliged to pay a heavy fine to the Crown. William Skipwith (died 1547), MP for Lincolnshire, was a direct descendant.

== Sources ==
- Lee, Sidney, ed. (1897). "Skipwith, William de" . Dictionary of National Biography. Vol. 52. London: Smith, Elder & Co. p. 356.

Legal offices
Preceded by John Keppock	Lord Chief Justice of the King's Bench for Ireland; 1370-72	Succeeded by John Keppock
