= William Tany =

Prior of the Order of Hospitallers in Ireland

William Tany or Tani (died c.1384) was Prior of the Order of Hospitallers in Ireland. He also served as Justiciar of Ireland 1373–1374, and as Lord Chancellor of Ireland from 1374 to 1377, and again from 1382 to 1384.

He was apparently English by birth, since the election of his successor, the Anglo-Irish knight Richard White, in 1384, was regarded by many as a protest by the Irish Knights against the imposition of English priors. He is first heard of at the Order's house at Kilteel, County Kildare, in 1365. He probably became Prior in 1371 (some sources give an earlier date). The Pope suggested that he and the English Prior work together to organise a crusade. In 1375 he was much occupied as Chancellor with the King's business in several parts of Leinster, and was thus unable to hold the assizes at Waterford: John Keppock, the Lord Chief Justice of Ireland, deputised for him, without the Great Seal of Ireland. In 1375 he was granted the lands of Sir Thomas Verdon at Rathmore, County Meath (these later reverted to Sir John Cruys and his wife Matilda, Verdon's daughter and son-in-law). He was regularly summoned to the Irish Parliament, and in 1376 he received an exemption from military service in consideration of the many charities performed by his Order, and the large number of chaplains maintained in his house for saying mass. His salary as Chancellor was £40 per annum, a large amount of money at the time (although a later Chancellor, Richard Northalis, complained that it did not even cover a third of his expenses, and asked for an increase of £20). His salary as Justiciar seems to have been £125 every quarter. He was entitled to an armed guard of six men-at-arms and twelve archers, and received an unspecified sum to pay their arrears of wages in 1377. He was sent by the Privy Council of Ireland to England on official business in 1377, which was apparently the familiar task of outlining Ireland"s grievances, and then went on a pilgrimage to Jerusalem. In 1380 the Crown restored to him his weir and fishery on the River Liffey at Chapelizod, which had been taken into the Crown's hands for repair. He was reappointed Lord Chancellor of Ireland in 1382 and held the office until about 1384. He was much occupied in his last years as Chancellor in arranging to parley with hostile Irish clans, and in 1383 he petitioned the Crown for compensation, in that he had borne all the costs of the negotiations himself. The Crown awarded him £20.

In 1383 he had leave to visit England again. He probably died in 1384, when Richard White was elected in his place. White should not be confused with the Lord Chief Justice of Ireland, Richard White, who had died some years earlier. Prior Richard died before 1397, when Peter Holt succeeded him.
