= John Tirel =

John Tirel, or Tyrell (died 1395) was a prominent judge and statesman in fourteenth-century Ireland who held office as Serjeant-at-law and Chief Justice of the Irish Common Pleas.

== Family ==
He was the son of Warin Tirel. The Tirels or Tyrells of Powerstown were a junior branch of the leading Anglo-Irish family of Tyrell. The senior branch of the family, which died out in the male line in 1370, held the Irish feudal barony of Castleknock. He was a substantial landowner in County Dublin, with his principal residence at Powerstown Avas. The district is now called Tyrellstown.

== Serjeant-at-law ==
He is known to have been in England, presumably studying law, in 1354; he then returned to Ireland, where he held office as King's Serjeant, or King's Pleader, from 1372 to c.1381. His salary was 100 shillings a year, but seems to have been constantly in arrears: there is a record of part payment to him in 1380 of £6 5 shillings. The position of Serjeant then was an onerous one, and on occasion involved physical danger, since English rule in Ireland was insecure, and long journeys were hazardous. Tirel himself in 1380 simply refused to go on circuit due to the dangers of the roads, nor was he blamed for this. Carlow, the seat of the Courts, was burnt on several occasions, and, according to a petition of 1376 to the Council from John Brettan, one of the Barons of the Court of Exchequer (Ireland), many judges dared not travel there from Dublin. Tirel was designated justice for Carlow in 1389, and ordered to proceed there to hear a wide variety of civil and criminal cases, but whether or not he did so is unknown.

== Politics ==
He was a political figure of considerable importance, who attended the sessions of the Parliament of Ireland of 1375 and 1380, and several meetings of the Great Council (as King's Serjeant he was ipso facto a member of the Council). As Chief Justice, he was present at the Council meeting in September 1386 when Sir John Stanley, the new Lord Lieutenant of Ireland read out the letters patent for his appointment.

== Judge ==
He was appointed a judge of the Court of King's Bench in c.1381 and Chief Justice of the Court of Common Pleas in 1386. He was exempted from payment of certain of the feudal duties of a landowner in 1378. Like many Irish judges of the period he was reluctant, on grounds of safety, to go on assize, particularly to Carlow, where the royal courts were based: in 1380 Walter Cotterell, his successor as King's Serjeant, was deputised by the Privy Council to act in his place as judge of assize for Munster, Kilkenny and Wexford, "on account of the dangers of the roads". Cotterell acted in Tirel's place for several sessions, over a period of nine months. In 1389 Tirel was personally ordered to hold the assizes in Carlow. In 1392 he was described in the Patent Rolls as "Chief Justice of the Common Bench of the King of Carlow", suggesting that he had moved there permanently. He died in 1395.
