= John de Sotheron =

English landowner, lawyer and judge

Sir John de Sotheron (died after 1398) was an English landowner, lawyer and judge, who served briefly as Lord Chief Justice of Ireland.

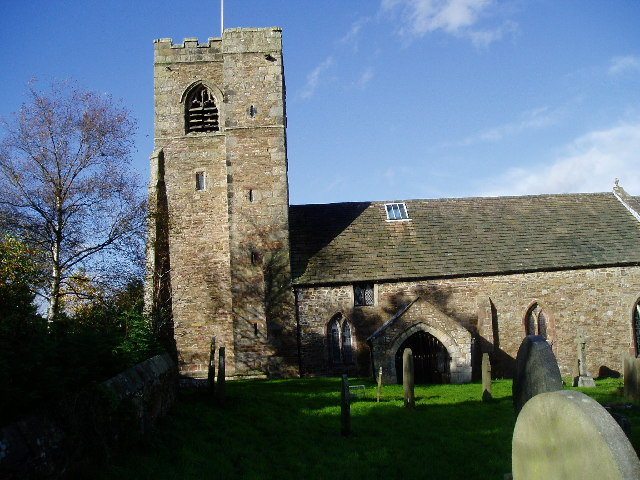
All Hallows Church, Great Mitton- the de Sotheron family were Lords of the Manor here for centuries

== Background and early career ==
He was the son of Thomas de Sotheron or de Sotherne, Lord of the Manor of Great Mitton in Lancashire, and grandson of Sir Robert de Sotheron; Mitton had passed by inheritance to the de Sotherons from the de Mitton family. He inherited his father's lands in about 1369; at the time he was involved in a dispute with nearby Cockersand Abbey over the advowson (i.e. the right to select his own candidate as parish priest) of Mitton Church. In February 1368 he was the defendant in a claim for a debt of 40 shillings brought against him by William de Mirfeld. He is known to have been acting as an attorney at this time.

In 1377 he was pardoned for killing John de Holden. He lived in a violent age, where cases of manslaughter and even murder among the ruling class were not uncommon, and a royal pardon was easy enough to obtain; nor would a criminal record necessarily hinder one's career, as de Sotheron's own later life shows.

== Judge ==
In 1384 he was sent to Ireland as Chief Justice of the Irish Common Pleas, but instead took office as second justice of the Court of Common Pleas (Ireland), and almost at once became Lord Chief Justice. He served for one year, during which there is a record in the Patent Rolls of him as one of three senior judges who acted for the Lord Lieutenant of Ireland in his absence in hearing petitions. He returned to England after a year, then came back to Ireland in the summer of 1386, as a legal adviser to Sir John Stanley, the Lord Lieutenant of Ireland, and was given letters of protection in June for the journey. He remained in Ireland for several years; he lived then at Dangan, County Meath (his wife's family, the Cusacks, held substantial lands in Meath). Ball states that his wife Joanna was kidnapped from Dangan Castle in 1392, but gives no further details of the episode.

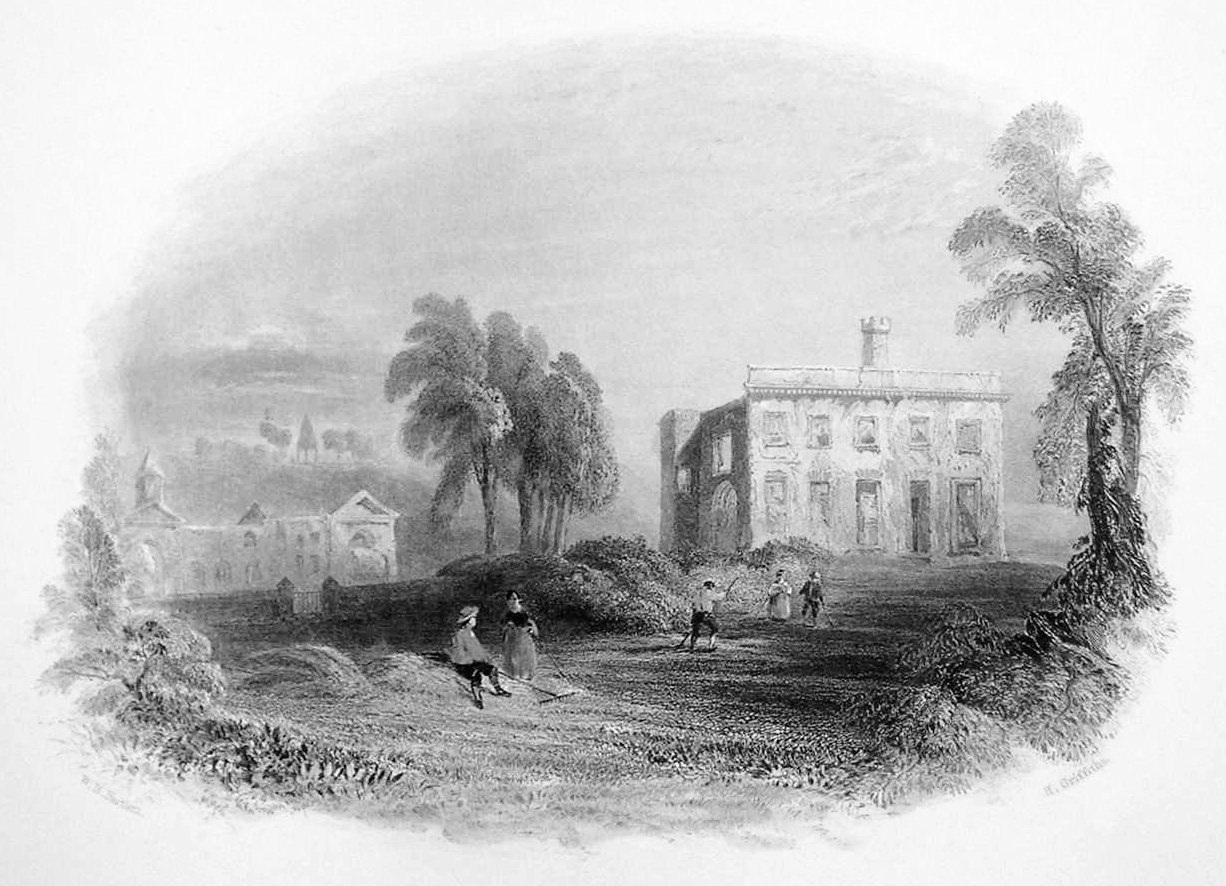
Dangan Castle, where de Sotheron and his wife lived in the 1380s and 90s

He returned to England sometime after 1392, was knighted, and retired to his estates in Lancashire.

== Family and later descendants ==
He married Joanna, daughter of Sir Simon Cusack, who was summoned to the so-called Good Parliament of 1376 as Baron Culmullen, and had extensive lands in Ireland, including Culmullin and Dangan, County Meath. Joanna and her sister Margaret presumably inherited a share of these lands, although their father had a son John by his second wife Nicola Bathe, who was apparently still a minor when his father died. His father had granted him the family estates at Dangan. Nicola remarried another senior Irish judge, John de Shriggeley. She and her second husband fought a long and bitter battle for possession of Culmullen against various Cusack relatives; the feud dragged on into the next generation, and caused a number of violent deaths.

John and Joanna had two surviving children, Christopher and Isabella, who married Walter Hawksworth of Hawksworth, Yorkshire: her father gave her a dowry of 80 marks. He was still living in 1397/8, when he and his son and heir Christopher were in dispute with Roger White and others as to the ownership of lands at Great Mitton.

The Great Mitton estate passed to Christopher, who had two sons, John (living 1419), who was parish priest of Upton-cum-Chalvey, Buckinghamshire (now a suburb of Slough), and Robert, who inherited the estates. His descendants remained at Great Mitton for several generations. The family name was later spelt Sherburne.

Legal offices
Preceded by Thomas Mortimer	Lord Chief Justice of the King's Bench for Ireland; 1384–1385	Succeeded by John Penros
