= William de Karlell =

Irish judge and politician

William de Karlell (died 1383) was an English-born judge, administrator and cleric in fourteenth-century Ireland. He held numerous benefices including Archdeacon of Meath and Rector of Youghal, and sat in the Irish House of Commons. After sitting for some years as a Baron of the Court of Exchequer (Ireland) he was removed from office, following a flood of complaints about his acts of extortion and oppression committed by himself and Chief Baron Holywood, but he was later restored to favour, and served briefly as Chief Baron of the Irish Exchequer. He is buried in St Canice's Cathedral, Kilkenny.

== Background ==
He took his family name from his birthplace, Carlisle, Cumberland, and was sometimes called simply Karlell. John de Karlell (died 1393), Chancellor of St Patrick's Cathedral, Dublin, was his brother; John also became a Baron of the Irish Exchequer, and was briefly Chancellor of the Exchequer of Ireland. They were apparently of fairly humble origins, as is suggested by the later complaint that William was not a fit person to arrest a member of the aristocratic Wellesley family. William himself was clearly rather sensitive about his background.

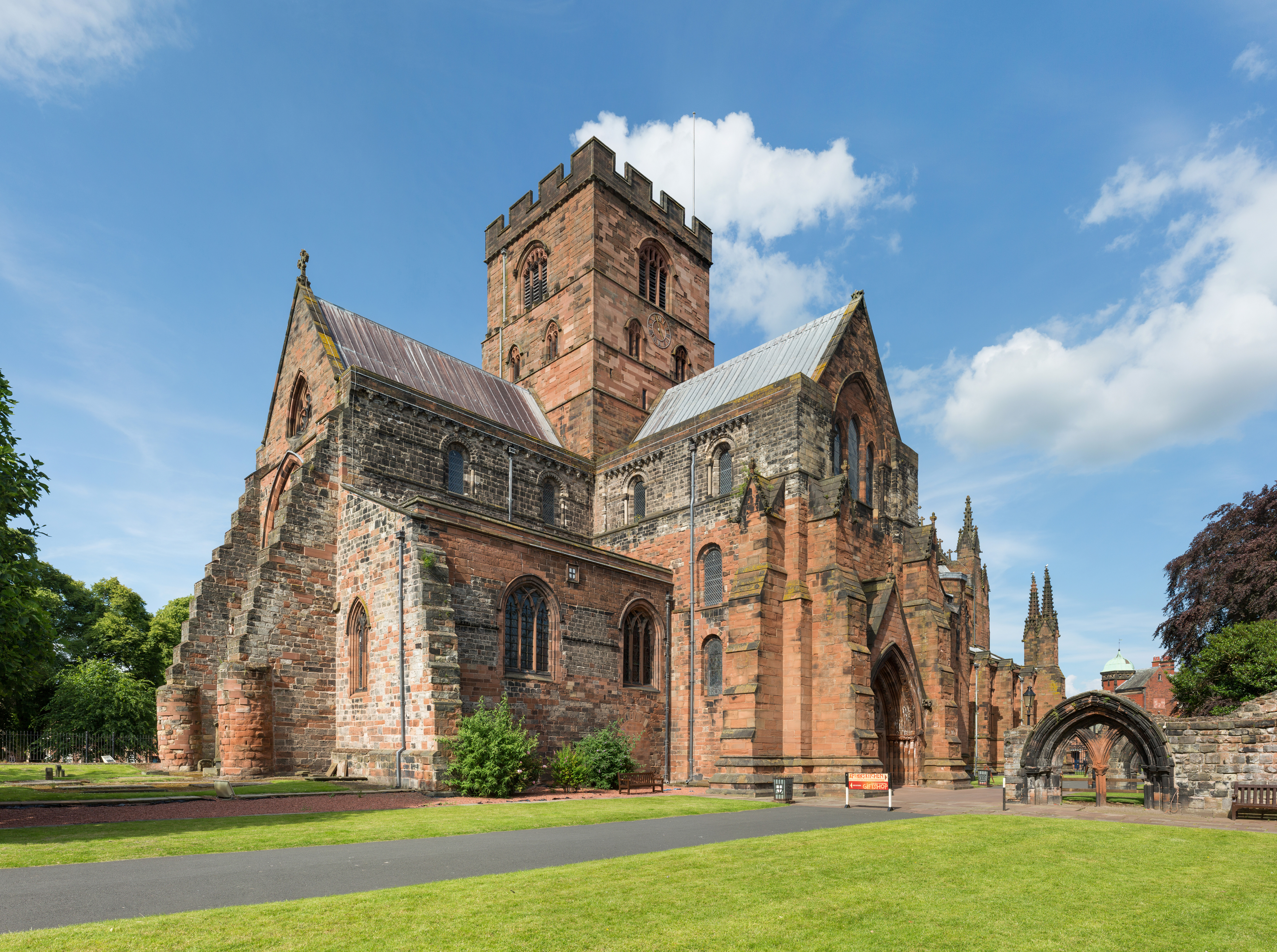
Carlisle Cathedral

== Career ==
He came to Ireland as part of the entourage of the King's second son Lionel of Antwerp, the Lord Lieutenant of Ireland, in 1361, and was made a Baron of the Court of Exchequer (Ireland) in 1367. He became a prebendary of St Patrick's Cathedral the same year and later acquired numerous other prebends, including Ossory and Killaugy, County Wexford. In 1375 he became a canon of Ferns Cathedral.

His main residence was in Kilkenny: he was a burgess of the city, and died there. In 1374 he and his brother John were summoned to the Parliament of Ireland in Dublin as members for Kilkenny City. citing There is evidence that other members of the Karlell family also settled in Kilkenny. A second William Karlell, described as "William son of John Karlell", possibly a grand-nephew of the first William, was executor of the two brothers' estates in 1394.

During the political crisis of 1376, which led to the downfall of the unpopular Lord Lieutenant of Ireland, Sir William de Windsor, Karlell and his Chief Baron, Robert de Holywood, were both bitterly attacked as associates of Windsor. Both were dismissed from office and summoned to England to answer before the English Privy Council for charges of "oppression and extortion" made by numerous members of the Anglo-Irish nobility, but no further action was taken against them. Holywood retired into private life, but in Karlell's case, the disgrace was temporary. In 1383 the King appointed him Queen's Attorney for Ireland; soon after he was made Chief Baron, but he died within a few months of his promotion. From a petition by his executor, William Karlell the younger, concerning his estate, it is clear that he was in debt to the Crown when he died. William sought a pardon for the debts to the Crown, and this was granted on payment by William of £40.

== Duties ==
James Graves remarks that since the Catholic Church in the fourteenth century was the only body which could be relied on to produce highly educated men, clerics like the Karlell brothers were as much civil servants as priests. William's duties went far beyond his judicial tasks: he audited accounts, collected revenues due to the Crown, supervised sheriffs elections, inquired into the condition of Crown lands, and into the existence of buried treasure. His duties involved much labour and expenditure of money, and in 1374 he received £20 for, among other expenses, the theft of his horse while he was travelling from Carlow to Drogheda. This journey does not seem to have been connected with the lengthy inquiry into the Crown's prerogative rights in County Wexford and County Waterford, with particular regard to the question of treasure trove, which was conducted by de Karlell and two colleagues, John Keppock and Walter Cotterell. In pursuit of this business he lost two other horses, and petitioned for compensation. In 1380 he was sent to Counties Cork and Limerick to levy all debts owed to the King or outstanding from the previous reign.

It may have been his activities on the Crown's behalf which caused his great unpopularity with the Anglo-Irish ruling class, and this, in turn, may explain the later charges of extortion which were made against him, especially in the mid-1370s, when he became identified with the bitterly resented Windsor regime.

== Character ==
From the evidence available to us about his personality, he seems to have been a proud man with a keen sense of his own dignity. In 1372 Sir William de Wellesley, High Sheriff of Kildare and ancestor of the 1st Duke of Wellington, was arrested for disobeying a summons to appear before Karlell, and in the following year, one Richard Bateman was found guilty of contempt of court for saying that Karlell was not fit to arrest one of Wellesley's rank, presumably due to his low social standing. The flood of complaints made against him in 1376 by numerous Anglo-Irish nobles certainly show him to have been unpopular and high-handed, but it remains unclear how much truth there was in the charges of extortion. He appears to have been quite litigious, suing Nicholas Calf and Henry Blake for trespass in 1375, and demanding that penalties be imposed on them when they failed to appear.

== Tomb ==
James Graves in his history of St. Canice's Cathedral, published in 1857, described William's tomb as a coffin-shaped slab, six feet by two, elevated about two feet from the floor of the cathedral, and completely unadorned except for an inscription giving William's name and clerical offices. His brother John was also buried in St Canice's ten years later, but his tomb was largely destroyed in the seventeenth century.

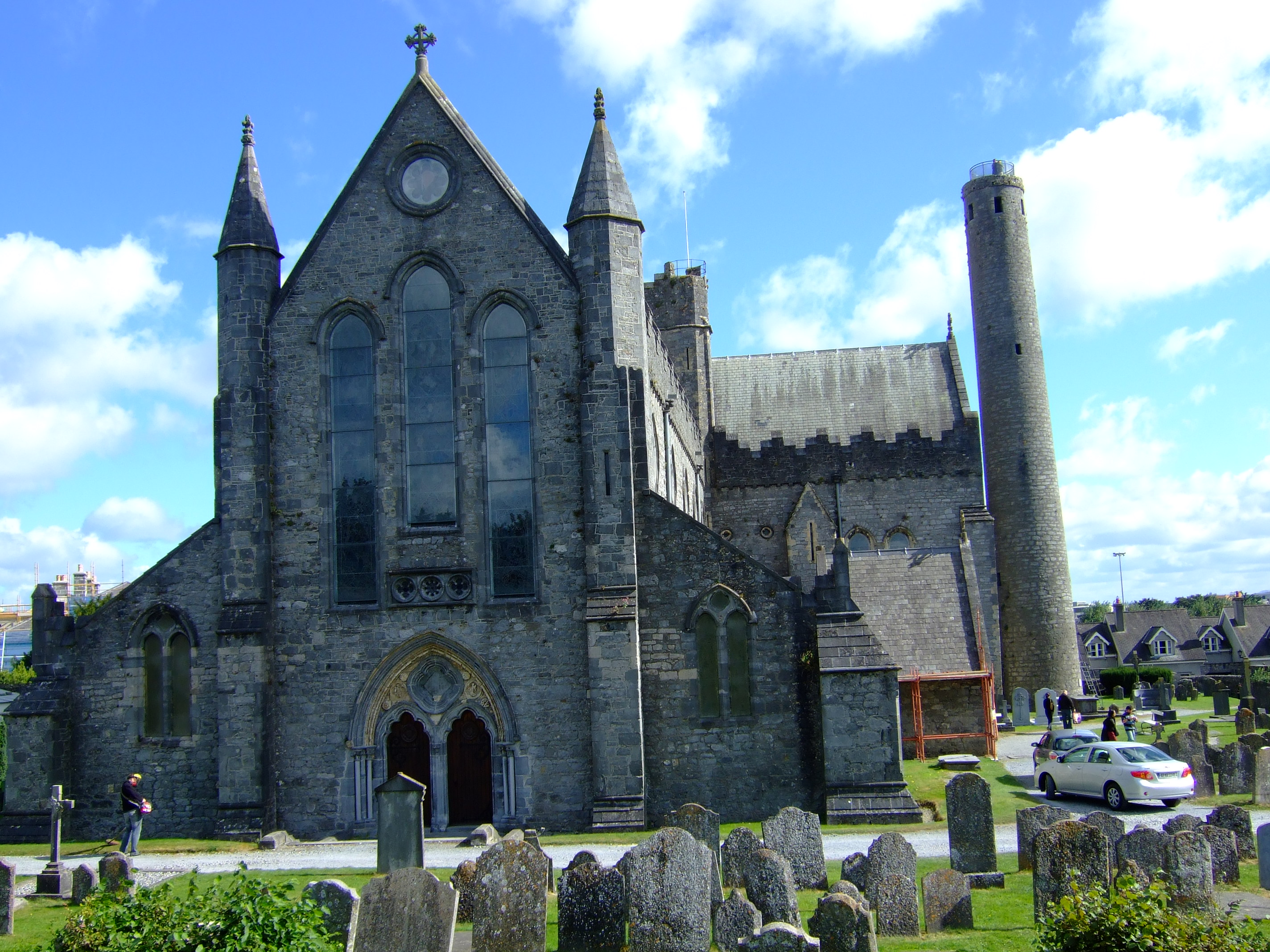
St. Canice's Cathedral, where William was buried
