= Glencree =

Valley in Wicklow, Ireland

- Gleann Crí
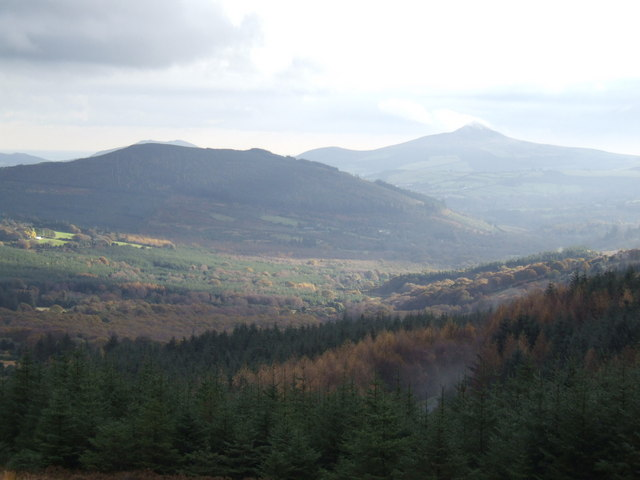

- Location within Ireland
- Location: County Wicklow, Ireland
- Coordinates: 53°11′N 6°15′W
- Governing body: National Parks and Wildlife Service

Glencree (Irish: Gleann Crí from the older Gleann Criothach, which translates as Valley of the Shaking Bog) is a valley in the Wicklow Mountains in eastern Ireland. It is the third-closest valley in the mountains to Dublin city, the first being Glencullen and the second Glenasmole. The River Dargle flows down the valley, which rises to a height of about 400 metres (1,312 feet). The foot of the valley is the site of the village of Enniskerry.

In medieval times it was heavily wooded and was a royal forest, apparently the only royal forest in Ireland. The trees seem to have mainly been oak. The name of at least one Royal Forester at Glencree is known, Sir Thomas Fitzadam, who was appointed in 1219.

== The barracks ==
The top of the glen emerges onto the military road, constructed by the British Army in the early 19th century in order to hunt down the United Irishmen guerrillas, holding out in the mountains after the Irish Rebellion of 1798. A barracks was built just off the road in 1806. At the end of the Napoleonic Wars in 1815, the building was vacated by the British Army.

In 1858 the barracks was converted into a reformatory school. St Kevin's Reformatory was operated by the Oblates of Mary Immaculate (OMI). For most of the year, the boys were housed in the rear building, which now stands derelict. On several occasions, boys attempted to escape back to Dublin. In 1878, a young student Shane Bodkin died from exposure on the Featherbeds after trying to leave the school. It closed in 1940.

Under Operation Shamrock the Irish Red Cross and the French Sisters of Charity cared for German and Polish war orphans here from 1945 to 1950.

The Glencree Centre for Peace and Reconciliation opened in 1975 to foster better relations between the two communities in Northern Ireland. Currently, they run a broad range of programmes bringing people from global conflict zones to the valley. There are programmes serving youth, women, ex-combatants, the churches, victims and political/economic leaders. Also, the centre provides training in mediation and conflict resolution, as well as hosting a summer school each year on a topic of relevance to the Irish conflict and society. Of late, they have begun broadening their reach to include actors from other global conflicts, most notably from the Middle East, Sri Lanka and Haiti. For many years, the centre ran a volunteer programme that invited adults from around the world to serve from two months to one year on programme and service work. On the site, there is a gift and coffee shop.

== German War Cemetery ==
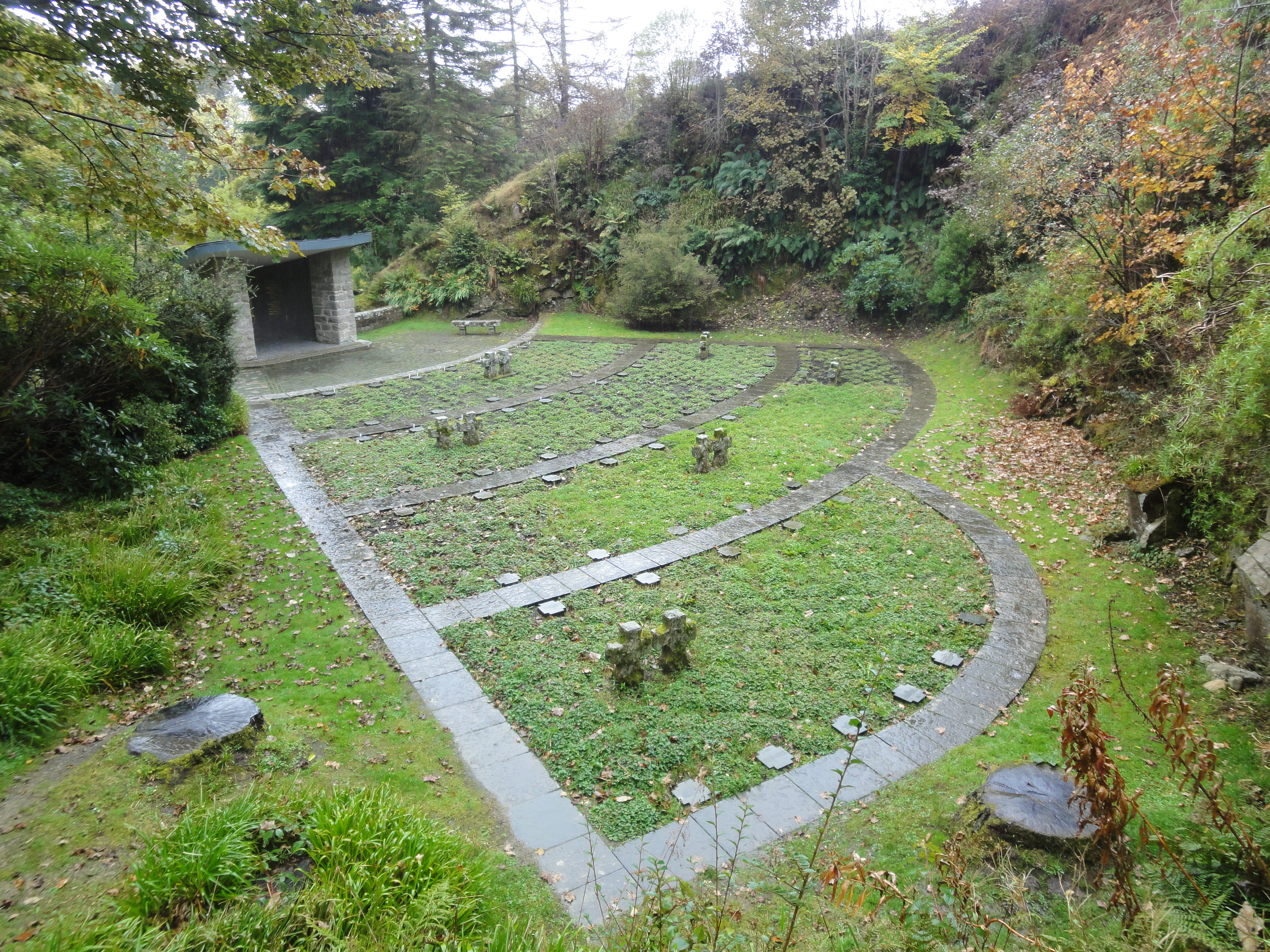
The German War Cemetery

Glencree German War Cemetery (German: Deutscher Soldatenfriedhof) was dedicated on 9 July 1961. There are 134 graves. Most are Luftwaffe (air force) or Kriegsmarine (navy) personnel. Fifty-three are identified, and 28 are unknown. Six bodies are those of World War I prisoners of war held by the British. Forty-six were German civilian detainees who were being shipped from Britain to Canada for internment when their ship, SS Arandora Star was torpedoed by a German U-boat, U-47, off Tory Island, County Donegal, in July 1940. Dr Hermann Görtz, an Abwehr spy, is also buried there. Dr Görtz committed suicide after the war when he was informed he would be deported; he feared he would be handed over to the Soviet Union.

The graveyard is administered by the German War Graves Commission (Volksbund Deutsche Kriegsgräberfürsorge).

Alongside the German Cemetery, on the bank of the Glencree River, a Mass rock can be reached by a narrow riverside path.

== Grotto ==
In the valley, by the Glencree River, there is a grotto dedicated to Our Lady of Reconciliation.

== Youth hostel ==
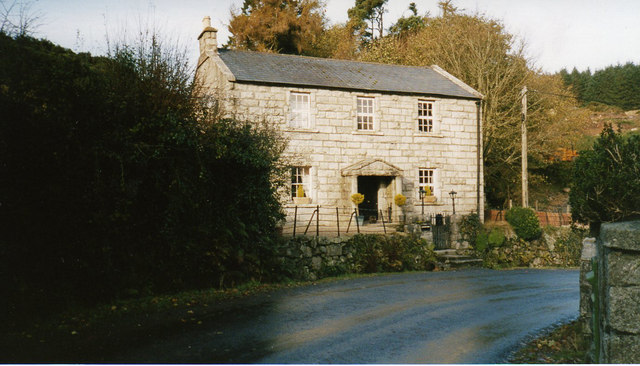
Former An Óige Youth Hostel at Glencree, Co Wicklow.

There was previously a youth hostel some metres outside the Glencree gates. The mountains around Glencree are popular for walking. This hostel, operated by An Óige since 1950, was sold on 2 May 2003.

== Films shot in Glencree ==
- Casino Royale (1967)
- Where's Jack? (1969)
- Zardoz (1973)
- The First Great Train Robbery (1978)
- Green Journey (1990)
Deutscher Soldatenfriedhof Glencree, Wicklow, Ireland
