= Remembrancer =

Former English civil servant post

The Remembrancer was originally a subordinate officer of the English Exchequer. The office is of great antiquity, the holder having been termed remembrancer, memorator, rememorator, registrar, keeper of the register, despatcher of business. The Remembrancer compiled memorandum rolls and thus “reminded” the barons of the Exchequer of business pending. Remembrancers also served in the Scottish Exchequer and the Irish Exchequer.

== Remembrancers of the Exchequer ==
The earliest known reference to a Remembrancer at the Exchequer occurs in 1248 (though some scholars have conjectured an earlier date for the origin of the office). There were at one time three clerks of the remembrance: the King's Remembrancer, the Lord Treasurer's Remembrancer and the Remembrancer of First-Fruits and Tenths (see Court of First Fruits and Tenths). In England, the latter two offices have become extinct, the Lord Treasurer's Remembrancer being merged in the office of King's Remembrancer in 1833, and the remembrancer of first-fruits by the diversion of the fund (Queen Anne's Bounty Act 1838). By the Queen's Remembrancer Act 1859 that office ceased to exist separately, and the monarch's remembrancer was required to be a master of the court of exchequer. The Judicature Act 1873 attached the office to the Supreme Court of Judicature (today called the Senior Courts), and the Supreme Court of Judicature (Officers) Act 1879 transferred it to the central office of the Supreme Court. By section 8 of that Act, the monarch's remembrancer is a master of the Supreme Court, usually filled by the senior master. The monarch's remembrancer department of the central office is now amalgamated with the judgments and married women acknowledgements department. The monarch's remembrancer still assists at ceremonial functions, relics of the former importance of the office, such as the nomination of sheriffs, the swearing-in of the Lord Mayor of the City of London, the Trial of the Pyx and the acknowledgements of homage for crown lands.

== City Remembrancer ==
There is the City Remembrancer, one of the City of London Corporation's law officers, its parliamentary agent, and its head of ceremony and protocol.

== Scotland ==
In Scotland, the office of King's and Lord Treasurer's Remembrancer is filled by the Crown Agent, the head of the Crown Office and Procurator Fiscal Service, and represents the Crown's interests in bona vacantia, ultimus haeres and treasure trove.

== Ireland ==
The Exchequer of Ireland was also staffed by a number of Remembrancers, headed by the Chief Remembrancer, sometimes known as the Treasury Remembrancer. There are references to a Remembrancer in the early fourteenth century, and the office of Chief Remembrancer existed by 1348, when it was held by Robert de Holywood, later Chief Baron of the Court of Exchequer (Ireland). The office of Chief Remembrancer lapsed in 1920, on the retirement of Maurice Headlam, and ceased to exist under the Irish Free State.
