= John Keppock =

Irish judge

John Keppock (died 1404) was an Irish judge of the late fourteenth century, who held the offices of Lord Chief Justice of Ireland, Chief Baron of the Irish Exchequer and Deputy Lord Chancellor of Ireland.

== Early life and career ==
He was the son of Simon Keppock of Drumcashel, County Louth. The Keppock (or Cappock) family settled in Louth shortly after the Norman Conquest of Ireland and were closely associated with the town of Ardee. John Keppock of Ardee who died in 1412, and was a leading figure in that town's government, as well as serving as High Sheriff of Louth, and Roger Keppock, a merchant who was living in Ardee in 1414, were probably cousins of the judge.

Keppock was living in England in 1352 and acted there as counsel for the powerful Anglo-Irish Cusack family. He returned to Ireland a few years later, and in 1356 he was appointed King's Serjeant in Ireland.

== Irish political career ==
In 1364 he became Lord Chief Baron of the Irish Exchequer, and in 1367 he was appointed Lord Chief Justice "ad placitum" i.e. at the pleasure of the King. In 1370 he stood down as Lord Chief Justice in favour of William de Skipwith, but remained an ordinary judge of the Bench, as the Court of King's Bench was then generally known. We have a record of the two judges sitting together on assize in Kilkenny, to hear an inheritance lawsuit brought by Philip Overy. In 1372 he was reappointed Lord Chief Justice, and he acted as deputy to William Tany, the Lord Chancellor of Ireland, (without the Great Seal of Ireland) in holding assizes in Waterford, in 1375, as Tany was too occupied with the King's business in Leinster to discharge his regular functions. He witnessed the letters patent appointing a new Lord Lieutenant in 1377. His term as Deputy was continued when Tany went to England to report on the state of Irish affairs.

In 1381 it was agreed that, due to his extra cares and expenses, he should be paid £30 a year above his normal salary. In 1382 he once more stood down as Chief Justice to become an ordinary judge of the Bench. He received an extra payment for his expenses while on assizes. In 1378, on his petition complaining that his salary was badly in arrears, there was a full inquiry. The inquiry resulted in an extremely detailed breakdown of the fees due: it seems that Keppock had not been paid his full salary in four years. An order was made to pay him in full.

In 1373–4, together with two colleagues, Walter Cotterell and William de Karlell, he conducted a lengthy inquiry into the English Crown's right to treasure trove in County Wexford and County Waterford, which seems to have been expanded into a general inquiry into the Crown's prerogative rights in those two counties. The judges were also granted the power to arrest ships. In 1375 Keppock was appointed to hear complaints from the citizens of Drogheda concerning attempts by certain persons to block the import of corn.

From 1377 onwards he was regularly summoned to sit in the Parliament of Ireland, evidence of his growing political standing. In December 1381, when Edmund Mortimer, 3rd Earl of March, the Lord Lieutenant of Ireland, was killed in a skirmish in County Cork, Keppock was one of the senior judges who summoned the temporal and spiritual peers to inform them of the Earl's death, and requested them to choose a Lord Deputy to take his place. In the same year it was agreed that he be paid an extra £30 a year above his normal salary. He was presumably the "John Keppagh" who was one of two judges appointed to try a case of novel disseisin in 1401.

== Personal life and death ==
Keppock married, sometime after 1358, the twice-widowed Matilda Gernoun; her first husband had been William de Nottingham, son of Robert de Nottingham, who was several times Lord Mayor of Dublin, and her second husband was John Gernoun, Chief Justice of the Irish Common Pleas. Keppock and Matilda are not known to have had any children, though Matilda had a son John by Gernoun, who seems to have come of age by 1350. Keppock died in 1404.

He earned high praise from the Crown for his "circumspection and loyalty".

Legal offices
Preceded by Thomas de la Dale	Lord Chief Justice of Ireland; 1367-70	Succeeded by William de Skipwith
Preceded by William de Skipwith	Lord Chief Justice of Ireland; 1372-82	Succeeded by Thomas Mortimer
