= Siddan =

Civil parish in Ireland

Coordinates: 53°48′N 6°37′W

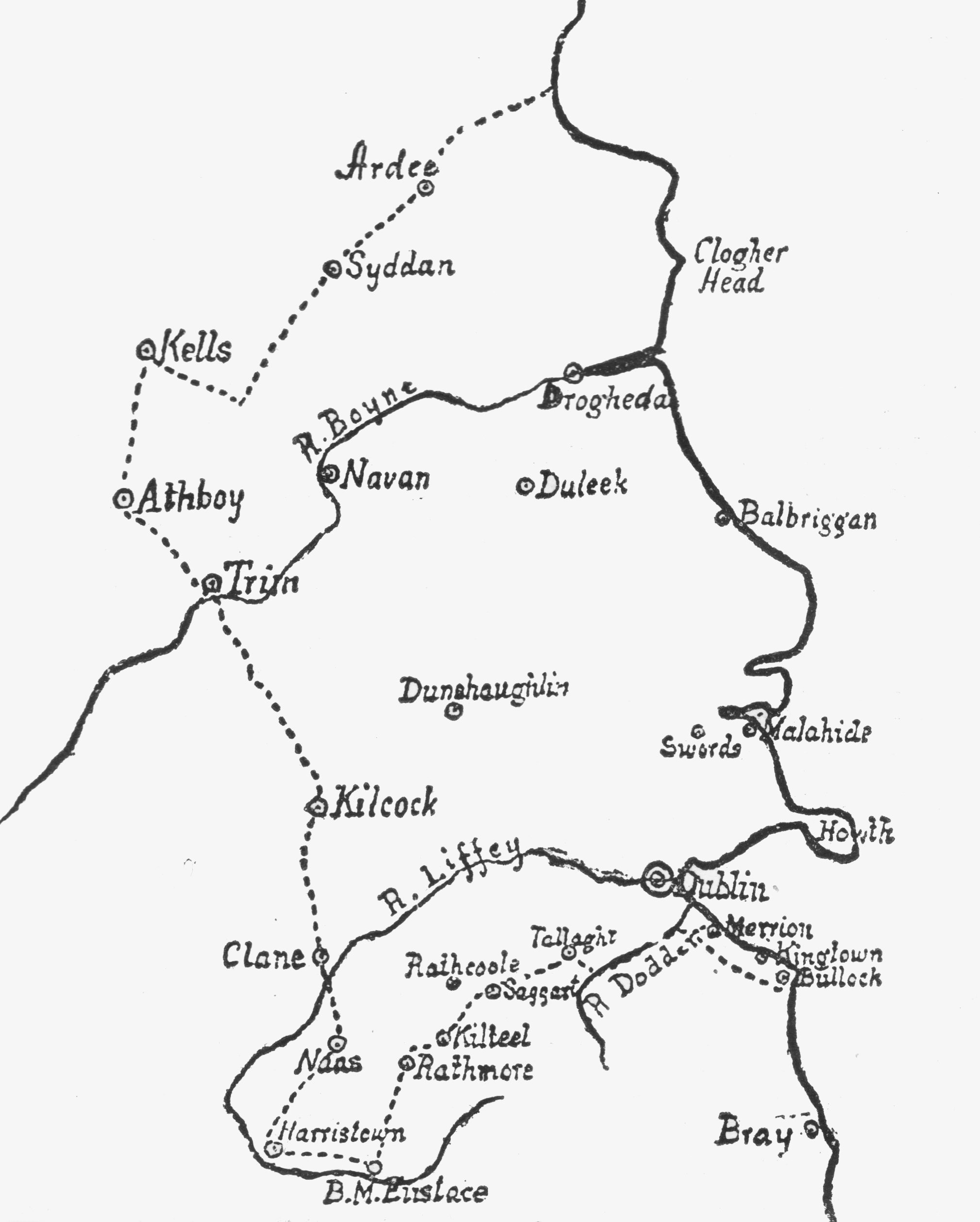
The Pale According to the Statute of 1488 featuring "Syddan"

Syddan (Irish: An Sián – fairy mound) is a civil parish in County Meath, Ireland.

The parish formerly formed one of the gateways that made up the border of the Pale.
