= Thomas Snetterby =

Irish barrister

Thomas Snetterby (died c.1463) was an Irish barrister, King's Serjeant and Crown official of the fifteenth century. He was remembered long after his death for giving his name to Snetterby's orchard near Kevin Street, Dublin.

He seems to have been a native of Dublin city and lived near present-day Kevin Street in Dublin city centre. Little else is known of him until 1447 when he was appointed Serjeant-at-law (Ireland), "so long as he was of good behaviour". He was granted the same fee, £9 per annum, as his predecessor Edward Somerton.

It is unclear if he was related to Reginald de Snyterby, second Baron of the Court of Exchequer (Ireland) 1424–1436. Reginald came from a family with a history of producing senior judges, including Thomas de Snyterby (died 1316), who came to Ireland from Snitterby in Lincolnshire in 1285, and was a justice of the Court of Common Pleas (Ireland) 1295–1307, and Nicholas de Snyterby, who was King's Serjeant in 1316, Baron of the Irish Exchequer and justice of the Common Pleas at intervals for some twenty years from 1337 onward. Reginald's direct heiress was his daughter Johanna, who married John Bennet, Mayor of Dublin.

The office of Serjeant was an onerous one: he was not only the senior legal adviser to the English Crown (at that time outranking the Attorney General) but effectively in modern terms a Government minister. In addition, he was required to attend at his own expense all meetings of Parliament and the Privy Council of Ireland "wherever held". Edward Somerton is known to have complained a few years earlier that the Attorney's salary was grossly inadequate given the workload. Presumably Snetterby made the same complaint, although not until he had been in office for three years: by a statute of 1450 it was ordained that he was to receive the same additional payment of 100 shillings per annum as Somerton had, charged on the rents of Chapelizod and Leixlip. A similar arrangement was made for Robert FitzRery, the Attorney General for Ireland (who held office 1450–63). In 1455 Snetterby was described as "serjeant at laws of our sovereign lord the king in his whole kingdom of Ireland". He was ex officio a member of the Privy Council of Ireland, though there are few records of his attendance at its meetings.

He stepped down as Serjeant sometime between 1455 and 1460. A statute of the Irish Parliament in 1463 confirmed the right of dower of the widow of "Thomas Sueterby", which was an alternative spelling of Snetterby. Thomas Sueterby, described as "of Saint Mary's Abbey, Dublin" made his last will in 1463. This was probably the same Thomas Sueterby who, with his wife Johanna St Leger, gifted land to Tallaght Church near Dublin.

The orchard adjoining his house south of Kevin Street long outlasted the house itself, and was still known in the seventeenth century as "Thomas Snetterby's orchard". Warburton in his History of Dublin (1818) refers rather vaguely to "the old records" in which the name occurs. Later it seems to have been called "the Chancellor's orchard", though it is unclear which Chancellor it commemorated.

== Sources ==
- Ball, F. Elrington The Judges in Ireland 1221-1921 London John Murray 1926
- Hand, Geoffrey English Law in Ireland 1290-1324 Cambridge University Press 1967
- Handcock, William Domville The History and Antiquities of the Parish of Tallaght in the County of Dublin 2nd Edition Dublin 1899
- Hart, A. R. A History of the King's Serjeants-at-law in Ireland Four Courts Press Dublin 2000
- Patent Rolls 25 Henry VI
- Smyth, Constantine Joseph Chronicle of the Law Officers of Ireland London Butterworths 1839
- Warburton, John; Whitelaw James; Walsh, Robert History of the City of Dublin London 1818
