= Christopher Bernevall =

Irish politician and judge

Christopher Bernevall, or Barnewall (1370–1446) was an Irish politician and judge of the fifteenth century, who held the offices of Vice-Treasurer of Ireland and Lord Chief Justice of Ireland. He was deeply involved in the political controversies of his time, and was a leading opponent of the powerful Anglo-Irish magnate James Butler, 4th Earl of Ormond. His elder son Nicholas also held office as Lord Chief Justice, and his younger son Robert was created the first Baron Trimleston.

== Family ==
He was born at Crickstown in County Meath, the elder son of Nicholas de Bernevall, whose wife was a Clifford. His younger brother founded the Kingsland branch of the family. In 1432 he was granted an estate at Macetown (or Maston), near Skreen.

He married Matilda (or Maud) Drake, a member of the influential Drake family of Drakerath, County Meath, who was probably a sister of John Drake, Mayor of Dublin. The most notable of his children were his eldest son Sir Nicholas Barnewall, who like his father was Lord Chief Justice of Ireland, and his youngest son Robert, 1st Baron Trimleston. He had at least one daughter Thomasine, who married John Plunkett, a younger son of the Baron of Dunsany.

In 1424 Christopher was given the right to arrange the marriage of Alice Derpatrick, daughter and co-heiress of Robert Derpatrick of Stillorgan and Catherine Uriell, the daughter of Christopher's colleague on the Bench, James Uriell.

== Career ==
He was appointed King's Serjeant in 1422 and held that office until 1434. As King's Serjeant, he acted from time to time as an extra High Court judge. In 1425 he was one of three officials named to inquire into the collection of Royal profits in Dublin and Drogheda. In the same year the Crown ordered that he be paid his arrears of salary. In 1426/7 he sat on a high-powered judicial commission to hear an indictment for felony against Edward Dantsey, Bishop of Meath, who was accused, falsely, of stealing a chalice. The case was removed to Parliament, which acquitted the Bishop. A man called Penthony later confessed to being the thief, and was given absolution for his sins.

In 1428 he declined to act as Deputy Treasurer in the absence of the Lord Treasurer of Ireland, apparently because there was no precedent for such a position. In 1434 he became second justice of the Court of King's Bench. He was appointed Lord Chief Justice of Ireland the following year, "at the King's pleasure" and served, with one short gap, in that office until his death in October 1446. He was Vice-Treasurer of Ireland in 1430, 1432 and 1435. In 1434, shortly after his elevation to the King's Bench, he was appointed to a high-powered commission to inquire into all alleged acts of treason in Dublin and the Pale.

=== Butler–Talbot feud ===
Bernevall was regarded as a highly "political" judge, and his career reflects the bitter political divisions of the time. Fifteenth-century Ireland was deeply troubled by the long feud between the faction headed by James Butler, 4th Earl of Ormond, who was Lord Lieutenant of Ireland intermittently through this period, on the one hand, and that headed by Richard Talbot, Archbishop of Dublin and his brother John Talbot, 1st Earl of Shrewsbury on the other. While some judges, notably the Cornwalsh family, which produced two Chief Barons in turn, were supporters of Ormond, Bernevall was a strong supporter of the Talbot faction. He is said to have enjoyed the confidence of the English Crown and was a close associate of Giles Thorndon, the much-harassed Treasurer of Ireland. In 1444 Thorndon fled from Ireland, unable to bear any more conflict with Ormond and his faction. He attempted to appoint Bernevall as his Deputy, but Ormond promptly declared the appointment of a Deputy Treasurer illegal (Bernevall in fact had expressed to the Privy Council the same view of the appointment of a Deputy in 1428). Numerous accusations of wrongdoing were made by Ormond against Bernevall, but no action was taken against him, either because he enjoyed the confidence of the Crown, or because the Ormond–Talbot feud was, at last, dying away. Bernevall died in 1446, still in office.

Legal offices
Preceded by Stephen de Bray	Lord Chief Justice of Ireland; 1435–1436	Succeeded by William Boys
Preceded by William Boys	Lord Chief Justice of Ireland; 1437–1446	Succeeded by Richard Bye
