= William Chevir =

Irish politician and judge

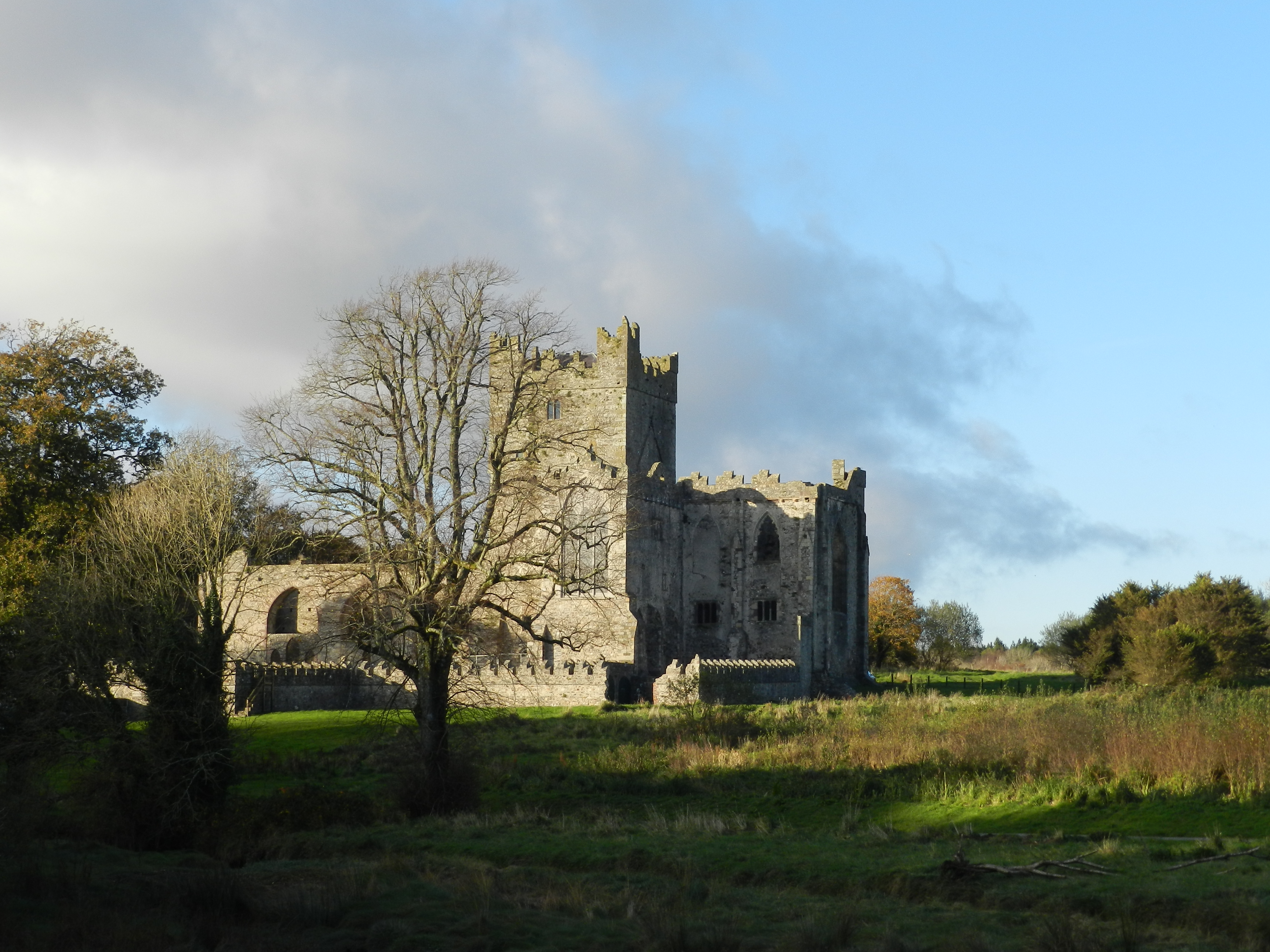
Tintern Abbey, Saltmills, Co Wexford

William Chevir, or Chevyr (died 1446) was an Irish politician and judge, whose career was marked by accusations of oppression and corruption.

== Family ==
He was born in Kilkenny city, son of John Chevir, justice of the peace for County Kilkenny; his younger brother, John Chevir junior, became Lord Chief Justice of Ireland. The surname, which is rather uncommon in Ireland, is probably an early form of Cheever; Chevre and Chevyr are other contemporary spellings of the name. They were an Anglo-Norman family who settled in County Wexford after the Norman Conquest of Ireland. Sir William Chevre (living 1174), the first of the family to come to Ireland, was a witness to the foundation charter for Tintern Abbey, County Wexford (not to be confused with the better-known Tintern Abbey in Wales). In 1421 William's father was granted lands in County Wexford which had been held by Gilbert Talbot, Lord of Wexford.

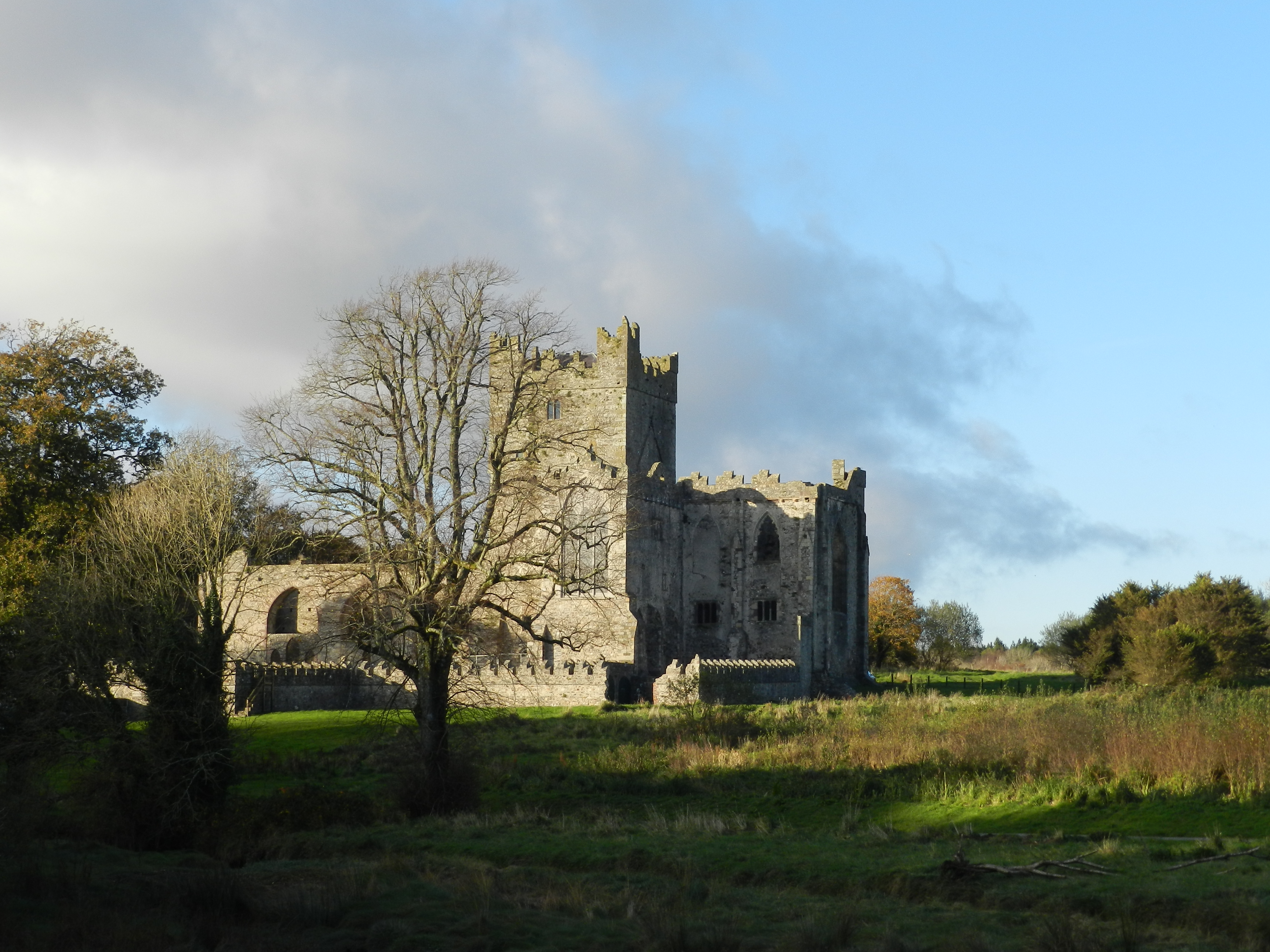
Tintern Abbey, County Wexford

William was married and had at least one son:

- Walter, who married Catherine Welles, daughter of Sir William Welles, Lord Chancellor of Ireland and Anne Barnwell, and had issue, including:
  - Sir Nicholas Cheevers,
  - Elizabeth, who married Thomas Ussher,
  - Margaret, wife of Bartholomew Aylmer and mother of Sir Gerald Aylmer.

== Career ==
Little is known of his early career. He and his brother were closely associated with James Butler, 4th Earl of Ormonde (1393-1452), the dominant Anglo-Irish magnate in the southeast of Ireland for more than thirty years. It was presumably due to Ormonde's influence that William became second justice of the Court of King's Bench (Ireland) and later acted as deputy to the Lord Chancellor of Ireland. He acquired considerable wealth, and became the owner of Ballyhealy Castle in Wexford, where his family lived until the seventeenth century. He was in receipt of a pension of £1 per annum from the Prior of Kilmainham, for reasons which are not known. In 1424 he was given custody of the lands of Nicholas Hay deceased in County Wexford during the minority of the son and heir Robert, together with the right of Robert's marriage. In the same year he conveyed at the King's command the manor of Rathfarnham to James Cornwalsh, the Chief Baron of the Irish Exchequer.

We have a glimpse of his judicial career in 1441. The Privy Council, concerned about the lawless state of Leinster and Munster, appointed Chevir and Edward Somerton, the King's Serjeant, to a commission of oyer and terminer to execute the laws in six southern counties. William was to receive 6 shillings 8 pence as wages, significantly more than Somerton.

In 1437, rather surprisingly since he was a layman, he was granted the temporalities of St. Mary's Abbey, Dublin; presumably he was to receive the profits of the Abbey lands.

== Talbot–Ormonde feud ==
Irish politics in the 1430s and 1440s was dominated by the bitter feud between the Earl of Ormonde, by then Lord Lieutenant of Ireland, and Richard Talbot, Archbishop of Dublin, backed by his powerful brother John Talbot, 1st Earl of Shrewsbury, who had also been Lord Lieutenant. Nearly all Crown officials found themselves forced to take sides in the feud: William Chevir was a staunch adherent of Ormonde.

Giles Thorndon, the English-born Lord Treasurer of Ireland, had a long and impressive record of service to the House of Lancaster, but he was quite out of his depth in Ireland, which was then in a state of exceptional political turmoil. In general, he backed the Talbots, but Ormonde persuaded him to appoint Chevir as his deputy in 1442. According to Thordon's later complaint to the Privy Council, Chevir was guilty of such obvious maladministration that Thorndon refused to reappoint him as his deputy in 1443, whereupon Ormonde in retaliation despoiled Thorndon's property. Both sides to the feud made bitter complaints to the English Crown, which however was more interested in ending the feud than punishing those involved, and matters dragged on inconclusively. Chevir probably died in December 1446, since his successor on the Court, Edward Somerton, was appointed in January 1447. Thorndon returned to England soon afterwards, and lived to a great age, dying in 1477.

== Reputation ==
While Chevir undoubtedly had every reason to be grateful to Ormonde for advancing his career, Griffiths criticises him for "abetting Ormonde in embezzlement and oppression".
