= Roger Hawkenshaw =

Irish Judge and Privy Councillor

- Died: 1434
- Occupation: Judge
- Years active: 1409-1434

Roger Hawkenshaw or Hakenshawe (died 1434) was an Irish judge and Privy Councillor.

He was Irish by birth. He was possibly the son, but more likely the grandson, of an earlier Roger Hawkenshaw, or Hackenshawe, a senior Crown official who was Escheator of Ireland in the 1370s. The elder Roger Hawkenshaw died in 1375.

The younger Roger is first heard of in 1409, when Richard Petir, who was mentioned in the Patent Roll in 1400 as a clerk in the royal service, appointed him as one of his attorneys to manage his Irish affairs during his absence abroad. In the same year, as a mark of the Crown's favour, he was granted jointly with Henry Stanyhurst the lands of Robert Bernevall, a minor, so long as they were in royal hands. In 1415 he was appointed a temporary judge on a panel of five (which included James Uriell) to hear an action for novel disseisin against Alice Brown of Brownstown, County Kildare. He was appointed second justice of the Court of King's Bench (Ireland) in 1416, on the death of John Bermyngham, at a salary of £20 a year.

In the same year he acted as Deputy to the Lord Chancellor of Ireland, Thomas Cranley, who was an old man even by modern standards and was frequently too infirm to carry out his duties (he died the following year). Roger also acted from time to time as Deputy to Cranley's successor, Sir Laurence Merbury. Soon after his appointment as Deputy he and Richard Ashwell, a senior clerk in Chancery and future Master of the Rolls in Ireland, were ordered to prepare and enrol all the Chancery writs, as the Chancellor's frequent absences on royal business meant that he could not perform such tasks in person. They were also commissioned to administer justice in several parts of the kingdom to such of the King's liege subjects as could not repair to the Court of Chancery to prosecute their just causes "by reason of the distance and danger of the way".

In 1418, he was one of those given permission by the Crown to found a new Chapel, called St. John's Chapel, near Dublin, as was his future colleague Reginald de Snyterby. Whether the chapel was ever built is uncertain. In the same year he was granted property in Ardee, formerly owned by Richard Burgess.

In 1420, the Crown, having received numerous complaints from the citizens of County Meath of illegal seizure of foodstuffs and other property by the troops and purveyors of the Lord Lieutenant of Ireland, appointed Roger and his colleague Richard Sydgrave to inquire into the matter.

Roger was reappointed to the King's Bench in 1422, at the start of the reign of Henry VI. He received the same salary of £20, plus a small daily payment called "wages". In 1425 the Council ordered that the arrears of his salary be paid. In 1427 he complained again that his fees were in arrears. The Crown ordered the Treasury to investigate, and it was found that the fees were indeed in arrears to the sum of £127. The Crown duly ordered that he be paid the arrears. In the same year he was appointed one of the justices and Keepers of the Peace for County Meath.

He was ex-officio a member of the Privy Council of Ireland. He attended an important meeting of the Council in December 1428, which debated the question of whether the Lord Treasurer of Ireland could act through a Deputy while he was absent in England.

Roger is thought to have died in 1434.

== Sources ==
- Ball, F. Elrington The Judges in Ireland 1221-1921 London John Murray 1926
- Haydn, Joseph The Book of Dignities London Longman Green Brown and Longmans 1851
- Smyth, Constantine Joseph Chronicle of the Law Officers of Ireland London Butterworths 1839
