= John Blakeney (Irish judge) =

Irish judge (died 1438)

John Blakeney (died 1438) was an Irish judge of the fifteenth century, who served three times as Chief Justice of the Common Pleas.

He was born in Dublin, to a long-established Dublin family. It is unclear if he was a relative of James Blakeney, another senior official of the same generation who held office as Chancellor of the Exchequer of Ireland and as Chief Escheator. He is first heard of as a Crown official in 1405, when he was ordered to convey lands at Navan to Sir Jenico d'Artois. In 1413 he was acting as judge of assize in Dublin and the counties of the Pale. He was appointed Chief Justice of the Irish Common Pleas in 1420 at Donore, the Crown authorities "trusting in his fealty and circumspection", stated that the appointment was "for his good services already done and to be done in the future". According to the letters patent appointing him, he was to hold office so long as he was of good behaviour. His salary was £28 per annum.

He was removed from office in 1424 but reappointed in June 1425. He heard a complex case of novel disseisin in 1425. He was superseded again in 1428 by Sir James Alleyn, but finally confirmed in office in 1430, and remained in office until his death. He was summoned to Westminster on unspecified business in 1429. He was ex officio a member of the Privy Council of Ireland, and there is a record of at least one Council meeting which he attended in 1436, concerning a proposed journey to England on official business by Lord Stanley, the Lord Lieutenant of Ireland. He died in 1438.

He was one of a panel of senior judges who were regularly appointed to commissions of inquiry into allegations of treason, serious crime or civil disturbance. Other recurring members of the panel were James Cornwalsh, Chief Baron of the Irish Exchequer, and Reginald de Snyterby, second Baron of the Court of Exchequer. In 1426 these three judges and Christopher Bernevall, the King's Serjeant, sat at Trim, County Meath to hear a charge of felony against Edward Dantsey, Bishop of Meath. The alleged felony was the theft of a chalice from the parish priest of "Taveragh" (probably Tara) in County Meath. The Bishop vigorously maintained his innocence, and in fact, he was innocent: a man called Penthony later confessed to being the thief. The case was removed to Parliament, where Bishop Dantsey was acquitted. Penthony later sought absolution for his sins and received a pardon for the crime.

A judicial commission might deal with more mundane matters, as when Blakeney together with Sir Laurence Merbury, Lord Chancellor of Ireland and James Uriell, the former Chief Baron, inquired, in about 1421, into the proper line of inheritance to the lands of the Bathe family at Rathfeigh, County Meath.

In 1432 he sat with his fellow Chief Justice Stephen de Bray and two other judges to hear a case of novel disseisin concerning lands in The Curragh, County Kildare. What seems to have been the last judicial commission appointing Blakeney as a member, dated November 1434, and which included most of the senior judges, was to inquire into all treasons committed in Dublin and the adjoining counties of the Pale.

== Sources ==
- Ball, F. Elrington The Judges in Ireland 1221–1921 London John Murray 1926
- Smyth, Constantine Joseph Chronicle of the Law Officers of Ireland London Butterworths 1839
- Close Rolls 2 Henry VI
- Close Rolls 5 Henry VI
- Close Rolls 15 Henry VI
- Patent Rolls 8 Henry V
- Patent Rolls 3 Henry VI
- Patent Rolls 7 Henry VI
- Patent Rolls 10 Henry VI
- Patent Rolls 13 Henry VI
