= John Cornwalsh =

Irish judge

- Died: 1472
- Occupation: Judge
- Spouse: Maud Plunkett
- Parents: James Cornwalsh (father); Matilda Rochfort (mother)

Sir John Cornwalsh, or Cornwalysch (died 1472) was an Irish judge who held the office of Chief Baron of the Irish Exchequer. His tenure was notable for the fact that he succeeded his father as Chief Baron, and for his long struggle to retain the office in defiance of a rival claimant, Michael Gryffin. He is also remembered as the builder of Dardistown Castle in County Meath.

== Background ==
He was probably born at Dunboyne in County Meath, and he later lived at Dardistown in the same county. He was the son of James Cornwalsh and Matilda Rochfort; the Cornwalsh family were originally from Cornwall. His father was Chief Baron of the Exchequer, with intervals, from 1420 to 1441, when he was murdered by the Fitzwilliam family in a dispute over possession of Baggotrath Castle. John followed his father into the legal profession and went to London to study law; he was living at Tower Hill in 1434. In the same year he was appointed to act as attorney for Thomas Yong, the Prior of Mullingar, jointly with Stephen Roche, the future Attorney General for Ireland. He is next heard of in 1441 "fighting the King's enemies in Ossory". In September of that year his father was murdered by William Fitzwilliam and his wife Ismay, in a bitter feud over the possession of Baggotrath Castle near Dublin, which Ismay's mother Lady Perrers at her death had left to the judge. The fact that Fitzwilliam and Ismay received a royal pardon for the crime gives us a vivid glimpse of the lawless condition of Ireland at the time (although it must be said that the condition of England, under the inept rule of King Henry VI, was not much better).

== Career ==
He was appointed Chief Baron soon after his father's death, and certainly before October 1442, when he attended a meeting of the Privy Council of Ireland in that capacity. His appointment was probably on the advice of the powerful Anglo-Irish magnate James Butler, 4th Earl of Ormond, who had been a close associate of the elder Cornwalsh. However, a few weeks later a patent was issued in London appointing Michael Gryffin to the same office, and the Crown made inquiry as to the basis on which Cornealsh had "outthrust" Gryffin from office. For five years Gryffin's supporters contrived to keep Cornwalsh out of office; finally in 1446, he obtained a declaration that his rival's letters patent had been obtained "surreptitiously and illegally" (this may be an allegation that it was a forgery, and not issued by the King at all).

This conflict reflected the wider political divisions of the time (his father had engaged in a similar struggle for the office of Chief Baron with Richard Sydgrave in the 1420s), but Elrington Ball suggests that there were also valid objections to Cornwalsh's appointment as a judge. Despite his being the son of a long-serving jurist and having studied law at the Inns of Court, his legal knowledge was thought to be insufficient to become a judge, although in his defence it may be said that his rival Gryffin apparently had no legal training at all.

In addition, Cornwalsh was a turbulent and unpopular individual: in the 1450s he quarrelled with the Duke of York, the Lord Lieutenant of Ireland, and with his Privy Council, and was accused of inciting the citizens of Dublin to rebellion. Ball does fairly point out that in the confusion of the times, it is not easy to be sure who was to blame in any individual quarrel. His marriage, according to local gossip, was also a troubled one. During York's final Irish Parliament in 1460, Cornwalsh was one of his few opponents, and an Act of Resumption, declaring his estates liable to forfeiture, was passed. No doubt for this reason he refused to attend Parliament (obligatory for Council members), for which act of defiance he was publicly rebuked. After York's death at the Battle of Wakefield no further action seems to have been taken against Cornwalsh, despite the triumph of York's son King Edward IV, the following year. Edward was generally willing to seek reconciliation with his former opponents: Cornwalsh remained in office until his death in 1472, and he was knighted around 1466. A possible compromise candidate as Chief Baron might have been the long-serving judge John Gough, second Baron of the Exchequer from 1443 to at least 1467, who was praised for his "good service" to the English Crown, but this was apparently never considered.

== Family ==
About 1460, he married Maud (or Matilda) Plunkett, who was already a widow three times over. Her previous husbands were Richard Talbot of Malahide Castle, Jenico d'Artois the younger, only son of the colourful soldier of fortune Sir Jenico d'Artois and Thomas Hussey, 5th Baron Galtrim, who was murdered on their wedding day, thus inspiring the nineteenth-century ballad "The Bride of Malahide". She was the daughter of Christopher Plunkett, first Baron Killeen and Janet Cusack. The marriage was reputed to be a stormy one: Maud was apparently just as strongminded and quarrelsome as her husband, and according to local gossip she often instigated the quarrel. She died in 1482.

Cornwalsh built Dardistown Castle, County Meath, in about 1465, aided by the £10 grant from the English Crown to landowners of the Pale to build fortified houses to aid in the defence of the Pale in the absence of a standing army. He had possession of Malahide Castle and the Galtrim estates (roughly modern Summerhill, County Meath) for his lifetime in the right of his wife. He had no children, and his estates passed to his stepson Thomas Talbot, Maud's son by her first husband.

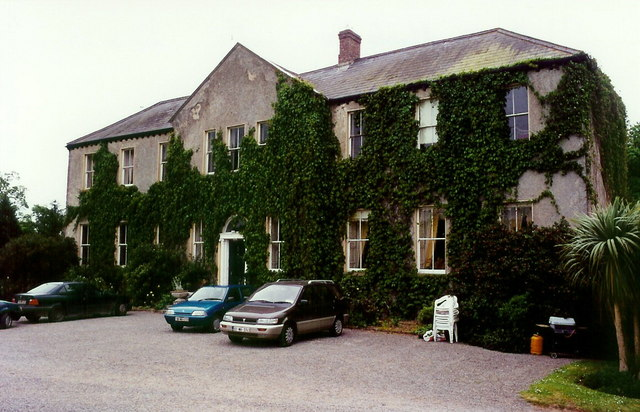
Dardistown Castle today.
