= Reginald de Snyterby =

Irish judge

Reginald de Snyterby (died 1436) was an Irish judge of the fifteenth century, from a family of English origin which produced several Irish judges.

He was probably born in Dublin, to a family which originated in Snitterby, Lincolnshire, and came to Ireland in the late thirteenth century. He was related, though in precisely what degree is unclear, to two Irish judges with the same surname in earlier generations, Thomas de Snyterby (died 1316) and Nicholas de Snyterby (died c.1355).

Church of St Nicholas, Snitterby: Reginald's family originated in the village

He is first heard of in 1410 when he received a royal pardon for their good services for "intruding" onto lands at-Ballyfermot which he held jointly with Wolfram Bernevall (who received a royal pardon in 1414 for all debts owed him to the Crown. Since the lands were admitted to be Reginald's, and Bernevall's it is unclear why a pardon was required He received a pardon for a similar action ten years later.

In 1418 he was one of those given permission to found a new chapel called St. John's Chapel, near Dublin, along with his future colleague on the Bench, Roger Hawkenshaw. Whether the chapel was actually built is uncertain.

In 1421 he sat on a commission with William Tynbegh, Chief Justice of the Irish Common Pleas, and Richard Bermingham, second Baron of the Exchequer, to hear charges of treason in County Dublin. In 1423 or 1424 he was appointed one of the justices and Keepers of the Peace for Dublin, together with Richard Talbot), Archbishop of Dublin. He was appointed second Baron of the Court of Exchequer (Ireland) in February 1424. He was one of a panel of senior judges, including John Blakeney and Reginald's Chief Baron James Cornwalsh, who regularly sat on judicial commissions to try or inquire into cases of treason or felony. He was a member of the Privy Council of Ireland, and there is a record of his attendance at a Council meeting in December 1428, where he was asked if he knew of any precedent for the Lord Treasurer of Ireland appointing a Deputy to act in his absence.

In 1426/7 Reginald, Blakeney and Cornwalsh were the judges who sat on a judicial commission at Trim, County Meath to hear an indictment for theft (he had allegedly stolen a chalice) against the Bishop of Meath, Edward Dantsey, which ended in his acquittal (a man called Penthony later confessed to being the thief). In 1434, two years before his death, Reginald was appointed to a judicial commission to inquire into all treasons committed in Dublin and the counties of the Pale.

He appears to have owned considerable property in Dublin. He had one daughter Joanna, who married John Bennet, Mayor of Dublin in 1456–7, and had issue, including Thomas. John Bennet died before 1479. Joanna was still alive in 1484, when she granted some of her lands in County Dublin to the Prior of the Cathedral of the Holy Trinity, Dublin, now Christ Church Cathedral, Dublin.

== Sources ==
- Ball, F. Elrington The Judges in Ireland 1221–1921 London John Murray 1926
- John Healy History of the Diocese of Meath Dawson Street Dublin 1908
- Close Rolls Henry VI
- Patent Rolls Henry VI
- Twentieth Report of the Deputy Keeper of Public Records in Ireland Dublin 1885
