= Michael Gryffin =

Michael Gryffin or Gryffen (died 1467) was an English-born judge in Ireland. He spent many years attempting to exercise his right to hold the office of Chief Baron of the Irish Exchequer, which was also claimed by his Irish-born rival, John Cornwalsh.

Little appears to be known of his background, but Griffiths states that by 1440 he already had a long record of good service to the English Crown, and Elrington Ball describes his social rank as a "gentleman". In consideration of his "long and loyal service to the Crown", he was, in 1441, appointed Chief Baron of the Irish Exchequer for life. This led immediately to a clash with John Cornwalsh, whose father James Cornwalsh, recently deceased, had held the same office; John claimed that he had been granted in reversion the right to be Chief Baron. This dispute quickly merged into the wider and long-running dispute between the two main political factions in Ireland, the Butlers and the Talbots. With the backing of the Talbots, headed by John Talbot, 1st Earl of Shrewsbury, The Crown, now siding with Griffin made an inquiry into the basis on which Cornwalsh had "outthrust" Gryffin from office. Gryffin managed to keep his rival out of office for 5 years; but in 1446 Cornwalsh, backed by his powerful patron James Butler, 4th Earl of Ormonde, obtained a declaration that Gryffin's patent of office had been obtained "surreptitiously and illegally". How a patent issued at the command of the King himself could be "illegal" is unclear: the use of the word "surreptitiously" perhaps implies that it was a forgery. The Parliament accordingly passed a statute annulling Gryffin's patent of appointment.

In justice to Cornwalsh, it must be said that he was professionally undoubtedly the better qualified of the two rivals, having studied law at the Inns of Court in the 1430s, whereas Gryffin, judging by the references to him in a memorandum of 1442, had no legal qualifications at all. Further, the lack of learning shown by the Barons of the Court of Exchequer (Ireland) as a body was a long-standing cause of concern to the English Crown. The memorandum of 1442 which referred to Gryffin's lack of legal qualifications proposed a series of reforms which included a requirement that the Chief Baron (if not the ordinary Barons) should always be a qualified lawyer. John Gough, who served as second Baron for some twenty-five years, and like Gryffin was praised for his "good service" to the Crown, might have been an acceptable compromise candidate, but this was evidently not considered.

The following year Gryffin was accused of "diverse offences" but he refused to give up the struggle to remain in office as Chief Baron: in 1449 he sat as a judge on a commission of oyer and terminer, which his enemies promptly declared illegal. In 1454, after conditions in Ireland had become more settled, he was exonerated of any wrongdoing. He died in 1467.
