= John Gough (judge) =

Irish barrister, judge and Crown official

John Gough, or John Gogh (died after 1467) was an Irish barrister, judge and Crown official of the fifteenth century.

He was probably a native of Waterford city (the name Gough, though of Welsh origin, is common in Waterford). There is a reference in the Patent Roll of 1428 to "John Gogh, justice", possibly the father or another close relative of this John Gogh. Nicholas Gough, described as a merchant of Waterford in 1421, may also have been a relative.

He acted as counsel to the city of Waterford in the early 1440s, in succession to Edward Somerton, who was appointed King's Serjeant in 1437. By 1442 Gough was being praised as a man who had given "good service" to the English Crown. In the same year, he was appointed second chamberlain of the Exchequer of Ireland in reversion.

He was appointed second Baron of the Court of Exchequer (Ireland) in 1443, "for life" (as opposed to the usual formula "at pleasure"), in succession to Thomas Shorthalls. Through the 1440s there was a lengthy and bitter dispute between the rival claimants John Cornwalsh and Michael Gryffin as to which of them had been validly appointed Chief Baron of the Irish Exchequer. Gough, with his record of good service to the Crown, might have been an acceptable third candidate, but was evidently not considered for the office.

He was a member of the Privy Council of Ireland. He is recorded as being present at a meeting in August 1444 when James Butler, 4th Earl of Ormond, Lord Lieutenant of Ireland, examined a monk called Thomas Talbot, who testified as to threats which he claimed he had heard Giles Thorndon, the Lord Treasurer of Ireland, make against Ormond. The bitter personal enmity between Ormond and Thorndon was a part of the wider Butler-Talbot feud, which had been a major problem in Irish public life for some 20 years past.

It seems that Gough's salary was constantly in arrears, and in 1450 the Privy Council of Ireland granted him a sum of £10 per annum charged to the Prior of the Knights Hospitallers (whose Irish House was at Kilmainham) and payable from the rents on the Hospitallers' lands at Leixlip and Chapelizod in County Dublin, to cover his outstanding fees. The grant was confirmed by a statute of the Irish Parliament. He and other justices were appointed to an inquisition in 1459. He was the senior judge sitting on a commission of inquiry at Kilkenny in 1459, to determine whether or not the Dean of Waterford was of English birth. Gough was still serving on the Court of Exchequer in 1467.
