= Thomas de Montpellier =

Anglo-French judge and Crown official

Thomas de Montpellier, or de Monte Pessulano (died after 1347) was a fourteenth-century Anglo-French judge and Crown official, much of whose career was spent in Ireland. He held a number of important lay and clerical offices including Dean of St. Patrick's Cathedral, Chancellor of the Exchequer of Ireland and, briefly, Chief Baron of the Irish Exchequer.

His family, who came to England from Montpellier in France in the late thirteenth century, had a tradition of service to Edward I and formed part of the royal entourage. Thomas himself is recorded as being in the service of the Crown by 1307, and in his official capacity, he visited Ireland on several occasions. Peter de Montpellier, who was Royal Physician to the English Court from c. 1303 to the end of the reign of Edward II, was probably Thomas's brother or cousin.

He became a prebendary in the Diocese of Ossory in 1318 and was subsequently made prebendary of Lusk; he was appointed Dean of St. Patrick's Cathedral, Dublin, about 1338. He made the pilgrimage to the shrine of St James the Great in Santiago de Compostela in 1319.

He was appointed Chief Baron of the Irish Exchequer in 1327, with a salary of £10 a year, but seems only to have served in that office for a few months. He was made Chancellor of the Irish Exchequer the following year. In the same year, Robert de Wodehouse appointed him his Irish attorney. In 1332 Alexander de Bicknor, the Archbishop of Dublin, appointed him as one of his attorneys while the archbishop was in England, along with his colleague Nicholas de Snyterby. Montpellier himself repeatedly visited England. In 1335 he returned to the Court of Exchequer (Ireland) as the second baron but was quickly transferred to the Court of Common Pleas (Ireland). He went to England in 1341. Shortly afterwards he was removed from the Bench: whether this was at his own wish or not is unclear. He was still dean of St Patrick's Cathedral in 1347, but nothing seems to be known of him after that date.
