= Michael Tregury =

Archbishop of Dublin (1450–1471)

Styles of Michael Tregury
- Reference style: The Most Reverend
- Spoken style: Your Grace
- Religious style: Archbishop

The tomb of Michael Tregury

Michael Tregury, in French Michel Trégore or Trégorre (died 1471), was Archbishop of Dublin from 1450 to 1471.

== Life ==
Michael Tregury was born in the parish of St Wenn in Cornwall. He was educated at the University of Oxford, and was at some time a Fellow of Exeter College, Oxford. He is said to have been an outstanding scholar.

He was chaplain to Henry VI of England and a distinguished scholar. He became the first rector of the University of Caen in 1439. He was Archdeacon of Barnstaple from 1445 to 1449. He was consecrated in St. Patrick's Cathedral, Dublin and was Archbishop of Dublin from 1450 to 1471. On the journey to Ireland he was shipwrecked and lost most of his valuables.

Tregury complained that the wars with the Irish and his predecessor's mismanagement had reduced the income of the Archdiocese below £300 a year. In compensation, he was allowed to retain the income of a number of monasteries. He was a member of the Privy Council of Ireland but seems to have played little part in government, concentrating instead on governing his diocese. He faced the hostility of the Gaelic clans, notably the O'Byrnes, who kidnapped him in 1461. He was also on bad terms with the local Anglo-Irish lords, as shown by his alleged assault on Stephen Fitzwilliam in 1465.

In 1451 more than fifty people from his diocese went to Rome to celebrate the jubilee then promulgated by Pope Nicholas V. Those who returned safely in 1453 brought the sad news that Constantinople was taken by the Turks, and the Emperor Palaiologos slain. Archbishop Michael was so afflicted at the news that he proclaimed a fast to be observed strictly throughout his diocese for three successive days, and granted indulgences to those who observed it, he himself walking in procession before his clergy to Christ Church Cathedral, Dublin, and clothed in sackcloth and ashes.

In 1453 he was taken prisoner in Dublin Bay by pirates, who were carrying off some ships from the harbour of Dublin. They were pursued to Ardglass, in County Down; five hundred and twenty of them were slain and the prelate released.

Like his predecessor Archbishop Talbot, he evidently had something of a temper: in 1465 he was accused in Parliament of assaulting Stephen Fitzwilliam, with whom he had a long-standing quarrel, but acquitted. In the same year he was threatened with litigation by two London merchants, William York and his son, over a debt of £40 for which he had given a bond acknowledging that it was owing. He was a noted music lover, and owned a pair of organs, which he bequeathed to St Patrick's Cathedral.

Having presided over his see for twenty years, he died on 21 December 1471, at a very advanced age, in the manor-house of Tallaght, which he had previously repaired. His remains were conveyed to Dublin attended by the clergy and citizens, and were buried in St. Patrick's Cathedral, Dublin.

== Burial ==
He was buried in Dublin and his epitaph reads:

Preasul Metropolis Michael hic Dublinenus
Marmore tumbatus, pro me Christum flagitetis

which translates as

Here's Michael the Prelate of Dublin See,
In Marble intomb'd, invoke Christ for me.

Catholic Church titles
Preceded by Richard Talbot	Archbishop of Dublin; 1450–1471	Succeeded by John Walton
