= Nicholas de Snyterby =

Ireland judge

Nicholas de Snyterby, or Snitterby (died after 1354) was a Law Officer and judge in Ireland in the fourteenth century, who held office as King's Serjeant, Baron of the Court of Exchequer (Ireland) and justice of the Court of Common Pleas (Ireland).

Church of St Nicholas, Snitterby, Nicholas' birthplace

He was born at Snitterby in Lincolnshire, England. The de Snyterby name is derived from the village of Snitterby; it was occasionally spelt de Sueterby. He was a close relative, possibly a nephew, of Thomas de Snyterby, who came to Ireland in an official capacity in 1285 and served on the Court of Common Pleas 1295–1307. Unlike Thomas, he was not a priest, being described in 1352 as Nicholas de Snyterby, layman, of the Archdiocese of Dublin.

Nicholas is first heard of as a Crown servant in Ireland in 1316 when he held the office of King's Serjeant, or "Serjeant pleader". Although an Attorney-General for Ireland, Richard Manning, had recently been appointed, (and is generally thought to have been the first to hold the office) the Serjeants-at-law (there were usually two of them at this point) remained for several centuries afterwards the senior legal advisers to the Crown, and pleaded in the Royal Courts on behalf of the King.

He was listed in 1326 in the Close Rolls as one of the officials who were ordered to take charge of and account for the goods and chattels of Walter de Islip, lately Lord Treasurer of Ireland, who was then in deep disgrace, facing charges of fraud and corruption, and liable to forfeiture of his property. In 1332 Alexander de Bicknor, the Archbishop of Dublin, appointed Nicholas one of his attorneys while he was in England, along with his colleague Thomas de Montpellier.

Nicholas was appointed second Baron of the Irish Court of Exchequer in 1337 and apparently settled permanently in Ireland the following year. He was appointed to the Court of Common Pleas in 1340 and sat in both Courts at once, possibly due to a shortage of judges. He was forced to contend for the office of Baron with William de Epworth, and was successful; Epworth was compensated with other offices, being appointed steward of the Crown lands and Seneschal of County Dublin. The office of royal steward turned out to be a mixed blessing as Epworth was soon accused of corruption and imprisoned, although he was eventually exonerated. Nicholas was superseded as Baron in 1343, but in the same year he sat as an extra judge to hear the pleas with John Morice, the Deputy Justiciar of Ireland, and was paid 10 marks for his good services. In 1346 he had licence to go to England: he appointed Thomas Snyterby, who was presumably a close relative, as one of his attorneys. He was reappointed as a full-time justice in 1347, and again in 1351, and was still serving on both Courts in 1354, although he must have been an old man by then. His Patent of appointment for the Common Pleas was renewed in that year. In 1351 he sat on a commission of inquiry into the lands of Maurice FitzGerald, 1st Earl of Desmond. In 1352, no doubt conscious of his advancing years, he was given permission to name his own confessor, who had the power to grant him remission of his sins, if he was truly penitent, on his deathbed. In the same year he became a notary public.

In 1346, prior to his reappointment to the Court of Exchequer, he petitioned for full payment of his fees as Baron, which were two years in arrears. The Crown ordered the Lord Treasurer of Ireland and the other Barons of the Exchequer to undertake an inquiry and to examine all the relevant records. On foot of the inquiry, which confirmed that the salary was in arrears, the Crown ordered him to be paid the full amount due of 45 marks.

Yet another member of the family, Reginald de Snyterby, was like Nicholas, second Baron of the Court of Exchequer (Ireland) in the 1420s and 1430s. He owned substantial property in Dublin, which passed to his daughter Joanna, who married John Bennet, Mayor of Dublin.
