= Robert Dyke =

English-born Irish cleric and judge

Robert Dyke, Dyck or Dyche (died 1449) was an English-born cleric and judge who held high office in fifteenth-century Ireland. He was appointed to the offices of Archdeacon of Dublin, Chancellor of the Exchequer of Ireland, Lord High Treasurer of Ireland, and Master of the Rolls in Ireland, as well as holding several Church benefices.

== Career ==
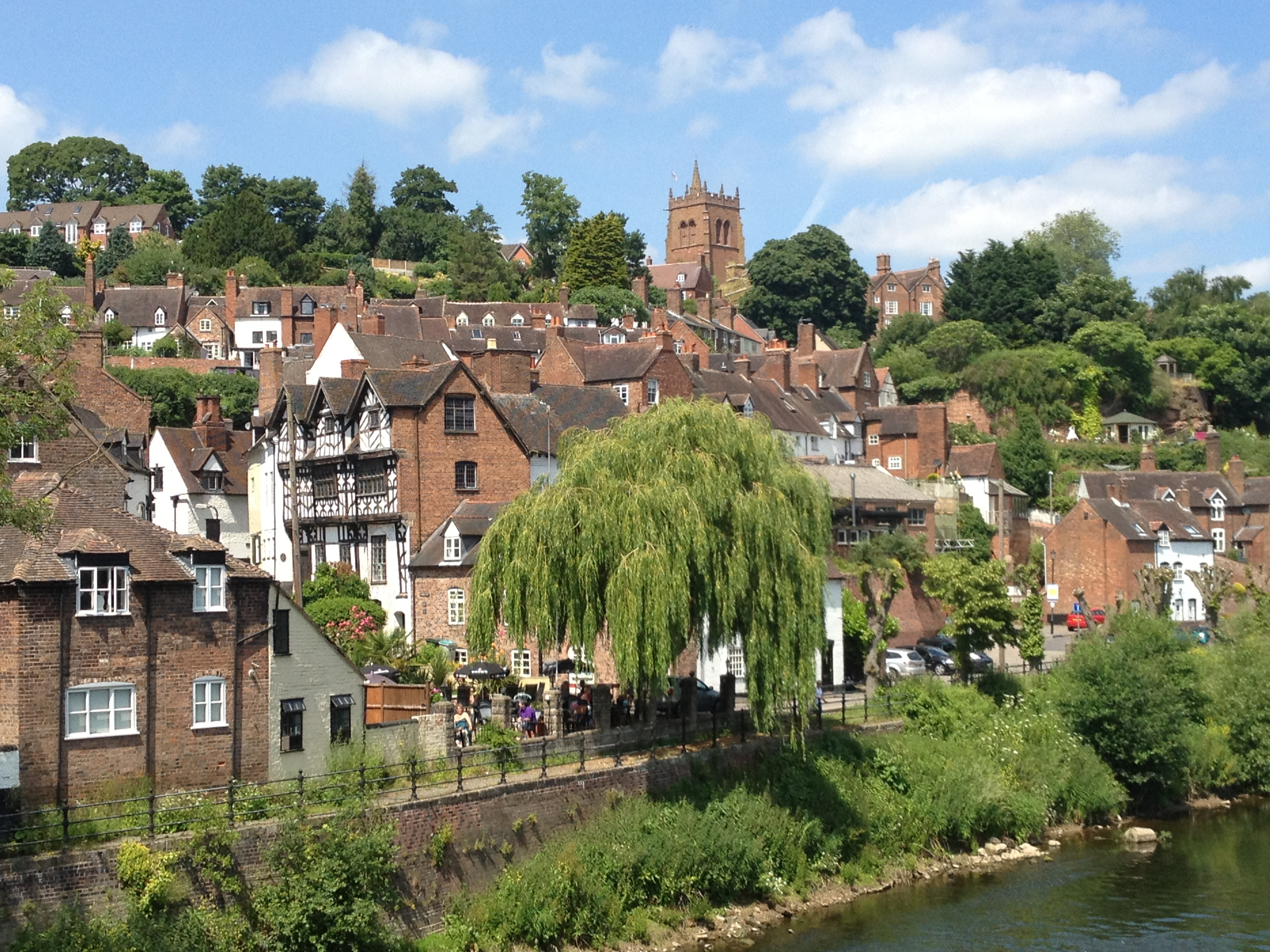
Bridgnorth, Shropshire, where Dyke was vicar in the 1420s

Little is known of his life before 1415, in which year he is recorded as an official at the English Court. He was then evidently a Crown servant of some seniority, given the later references to his many years of "good and laudable" service to the Crown. His first link to Ireland was apparently forged in that year, when he and John Gland were given joint custody of the lands formerly held by Katherine Bernevall, widow of Reginald Bernevall, at Drimnagh and Ballyfermot, Dublin. This John Gland was one of the Barons of the Court of Exchequer (Ireland), having been appointed to the Court earlier the same year, and was also Chief Auditor of the Accounts of the Exchequer. In the same year Dyke and Philip Earles, of whom little is known, were granted the manor of Lucan, Dublin "in consideration of their good and laudable service".

In 1422 Robert was appointed the Irish Chancellor of the Exchequer (or Chancellor of the Green Wax, as the office was often described then) and clerk of the Court of Common Pleas (Ireland) with power to appoint a deputy to each office. His appointment was originally stated to be "during good behaviour", but in 1430 he was made Chancellor of the Exchequer for life. He was in Holy orders, and became vicar of Bridgnorth, Shropshire in 1422. The actual date on which he arrived in Ireland to take up his official duties is unclear, although he had held lands there since 1415. He was acting as Chancellor of the Exchequer of Ireland through deputies in 1430. He had probably arrived in Ireland by 1431 when he became Archdeacon of Dublin. He was made parson of St. Patrick's Church, Trim, County Meath (now Trim Cathedral) in 1435, despite strong objections from the Archdeacon of Meath, William Yonge, who had nominated his own chaplain, John Ardagh, for the living.

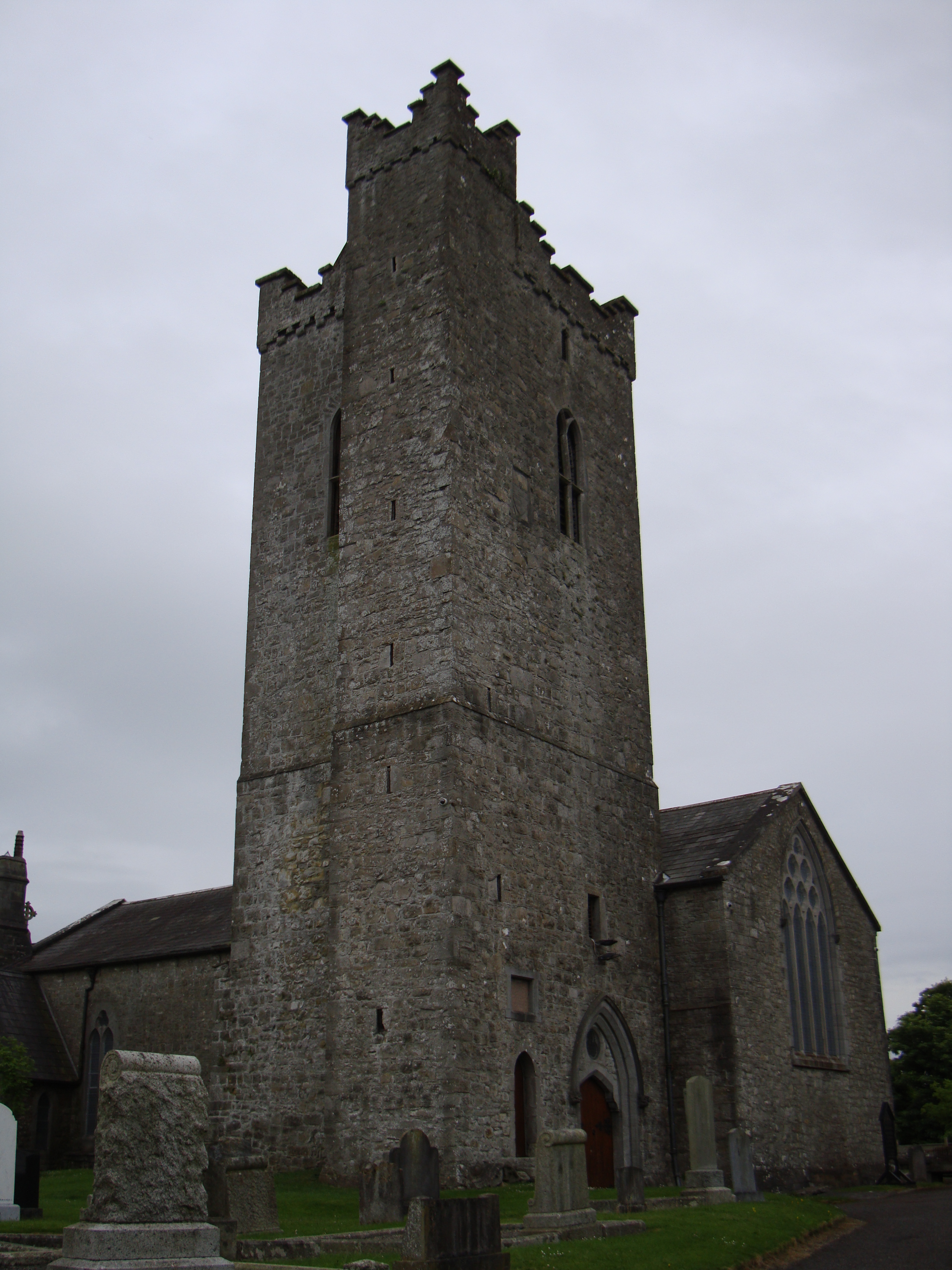
St Patrick's Church, Trim, now Trim Cathedral. Dyke was a parson here in the 1430s.

He became Master of the Rolls in 1436, with a salary of 5 shillings a day, and he acted as Deputy to the Lord Chancellor of Ireland in 1447.

By 1442 he had been appointed a member of the Privy Council of Ireland. He was present at a crucial Council meeting in 1442, at which very serious accusations were made against Richard Wogan, the Lord Chancellor, whereby he was deemed to have vacated office. Dyke served as Lord Treasurer in 1444–6, at the suggestion of Edward Somerton, the King's Serjeant, who praised him as a man of "honest life and conversation", with a long record of service to the Crown in pleading for the King in several Courts. In 1441 he was granted the manor of Ballymagarvey, Balrath, County Meath, for a term of seven years. He was a witness to the Charter of Athboy in 1446, whereby King Henry VI of England confirmed the liberties and exemptions of Dublin Corporation.

== Political Controversy ==
Irish politics from the late 1410s to the 1440s was dominated by the Butler–Talbot feud, led by James Butler, 4th Earl of Ormond on the one side, and John Talbot, 1st Earl of Shrewsbury and his formidable brother Richard, Archbishop of Dublin, on the other. It was almost impossible for any Irish Crown official to avoid being drawn into the feud: all of them were forced to take sides. Dyke was a Butler partisan and is said to have particularly offended the quarrelsome Archbishop Talbot: among a long list of charges made against Talbot by the Irish Parliament in 1442 was that he had assaulted Dyke and Hugh Banent (or Bavent), Dyke's successor as Lord Treasurer. Since Talbot, despite his high clerical office, was notoriously hot-tempered, the charge may well be true.

Dyke died in 1449. He was praised as "a man of honest life and conversation" who had served the King for many years, and filled several important Crown offices with honour.
