= Snitterby =

Village and civil parish in the West Lindsey district of Lincolnshire, England

Coordinates: 53.4405°N 0.5203°W

- Church of St Nicholas, Snitterby

- Location within Lincolnshire
- Population: 215 (2001 census)
- OS grid reference: SK985946
  - London: 140 mi (230 km) S
- Civil parish: Snitterby
- District: West Lindsey
- Shire county: Lincolnshire
- Region: East Midlands
- Country: England
- Sovereign state: United Kingdom
- Post town: GAINSBOROUGH
- Postcode district: DN21
- Dialling code: 01673
- Police: Lincolnshire
- Fire: Lincolnshire
- Ambulance: East Midlands
- UK Parliament: Gainsborough

Snitterby is a village and civil parish in the West Lindsey district of Lincolnshire, England. The population of the civil parish was 215 at the 2001 census, increasing to 245 at the 2011 census. It is situated 14 miles (23 km) north from the city and county town of Lincoln and 8 miles (13 km) south from Brigg.

The place name, Snitterby, seems to contain an unrecorded Old English personal name Syntra, + bȳ (Old Norse), a farmstead, a village, so possibly, 'Syntra's farm or settlement'. Eilert Ekwall suggests that this personal name is a derivative of the Old English word snotor, snytre meaning 'wise' The place appears in the Domesday survey of 1086 as Esnetrebi (twice) and Snetrebi.

In the late thirteenth century a local resident, Thomas de Snyterby, a lawyer by profession, moved to Ireland, where he became a judge of the Court of Common Pleas (Ireland). He returned to spend his last years in Snitterby but left behind family in Ireland, several of whom also became distinguished judges, including Nicholas de Snyterby, possibly his nephew, in the next generation and Reginald de Snyterby, who died in about 1436.

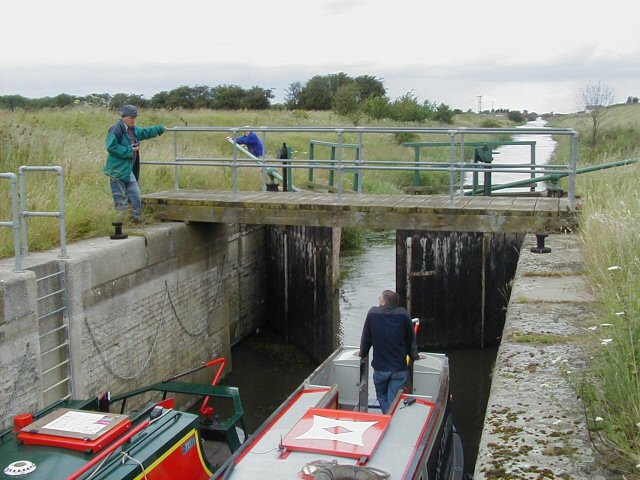
Harlam Hill Lock

According to the 2001 Census, Snitterby had a population of 215, with 100% of the population being white, and 75% calling themselves Christian.

The village is just off the A15 north-east of Caenby Corner, and south-east of Kirton in Lindsey. To the west, along the A15 (Ermine Street), the parish boundary is with Grayingham. To the north, it meets Waddingham, following Snitterby Beck, then eastwards to the New River Ancholme, and then southwards along the River Ancholme, where it meets Owersby, to the east. Near Harlam Hill and Harlam Hill Lock, it meets Bishop Norton, to the south. It passes south of White House Farm, and along Atterby Lane, then crosses Bishop Norton Road, and meets Ermine Street directly to the west.

The village has a public house, The Royal Oak, a village hall, and a church, St Nicholas, which is in the Bishop Norton, Waddingham and Snitterby Group of churches. Until 2007 the church clock had to be wound up by hand once a week. A £10,000 grant paid for a new mechanism.
