= Edward Somerton =

Irish barrister and judge

Edward Somerton, or Somertoune (died 1461) was an Irish barrister and judge who held the offices of Serjeant-at-law (Ireland) and judge of the Court of King's Bench (Ireland) and the Court of Common Pleas (Ireland). He was born in Ireland, possibly in Waterford, although he lived much of his life in Dublin. By 1426 he was a clerk in the Court of Chancery (Ireland), and was paid 26 shillings for his labours in preparing writs and enrolment of indentures, (indentures were agreements between the Lord Lieutenant of Ireland and former Irish enemies of the Crown). In 1427 he is recorded in London studying law at Lincoln's Inn. He returned to Ireland and was again in the Crown service by 1435, when he was ordered to convey lands at Beaulieu, County Louth to Robert Chambre, one of the Barons of the Court of Exchequer (Ireland). He was appointed King's Serjeant for life in 1437; he also acted as counsel for the city of Waterford, a position subsequently held by another future judge, John Gough.

== Serjeant-at-law ==
His duties as Serjeant were onerous (he was the equivalent of a Government minister nowadays), and he complained that his salary of £9 per annum was entirely inadequate, given his workload. The Crown agreed to his demand for an increase, noting that he was required to attend all Council meetings and sessions of Irish Parliament "wherever they should be held in Ireland" at his own expense, and that £9 a year was wholly inadequate for this purpose. Accordingly in 1440 his salary was supplemented by an additional 100 shillings a year for his lifetime. His successor, Thomas Snetterby (who held office 1447–55), later made similar complaints about the low pay of an Irish Law Officer, as did the Attorney General for Ireland, Robert FitzRery, who held office 1450–63 (although FitzRery was not as far as we know obliged to attend Parliament or Council meetings). Both men received the same additional payment, which was charged, in all three cases, on certain lands at Chapelizod and Leixlip.

In 1441, due to serious concerns about the lawless state of the southern half of the country, the Privy Council appointed Somerton and William Chevir, justice of the Court of King's Bench, to a commission of oyer and terminer to "execute the laws" in 6 counties of Leinster and Munster. Edward was to receive 4 shillings a day in wages, rather less than Chevir.

His period as King's Serjeant, then the Crown's senior legal adviser, was one of great political turbulence, marked by fierce conflict between the rival Butler and Talbot factions, with both parties contending to dominate the Government. His name appears frequently in the Patent Rolls in connection with the various political controversies of the time. There is good reason to think that he personally tried to stay neutral in the conflict and to maintain friendly relations with men on both sides of the dispute. Although Robert Dyke, the Master of the Rolls in Ireland from 1436 to 1449, was a firm supporter of the Butler side in the feud and necessarily hostile to the Talbot faction, Somerton valued him highly as an "honest life and conversation" who had given many years of good service to the Crown. It was on his nomination that Dyke was made Lord Treasurer of Ireland in 1444. Both of them were witnesses to the royal charter of 1446 whereby the liberties of Dublin Corporation were confirmed.

== Politician ==
He was a member of the Privy Council of Ireland. In that capacity he "spoke as the mouth of the Council" at its meeting at Trim, County Meath on 5 June 1442, when Richard Wogan, the Lord Chancellor of Ireland, and a prominent member of the Talbot faction, was questioned about certain articles he had sent to the Parliament of England denouncing his political enemy, James Butler, 4th Earl of Ormonde, the head of the Butler faction, who was three times Lord Lieutenant of Ireland. After the council, in Wogan's absence, had examined the articles, Somerton, who was described as the Prolocutor (Chairman) of the council, declared that the council found the charges against Ormonde to be false, and further declared that Wogan had acted without their authority in sending the articles to the English Parliament.

== Judge ==
In 1447 he was appointed second justice of the Court of King's Bench; unusually he was appointed by act of Parliament. He was to receive the same fee as his predecessor William Chevir. In 1457 he asked for permission to found a chantry at the Church of St. Nicholas Within, Dublin (which has largely disappeared), and Parliament granted his request the following year. He was transferred to the Court of Common Pleas as second justice in February 1458. In 1452 he was given joint custody of the lands of Nicholas Holywood deceased during the minority of his son and heir Robert, and the right to arrange Robert's marriage. He died in 1461.

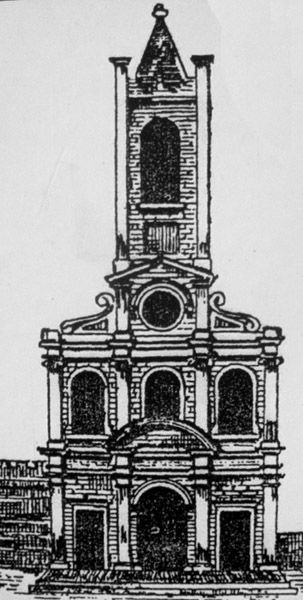
Church of St Nicholas Within, Dublin: Somerton applied for and was granted permission to found a chantry here

== Sources ==
- Ball, F. Elrington The Judges in Ireland 1221–1921 London John Murray 1926
- Hart, A.R. A History of the King's Serjeants-at-law in Ireland Dublin Four Courts Press 2000
- Morrin, James Calendar of the Patent and Close Rolls of Chancery in Ireland of the 18th to the 45th Queen Elizabeth Dublin Alexander Thom and Co 1862.
- Smyth, Constantine Joseph Chronicle of the Law Officers of Ireland London Butterworths 1839
- Close Rolls Henry VI
- Patent Rolls Henry VI
