= William Yonge (judge) =

Irish cleric and judge (died c. 1437)

William Yonge or Young (died c. 1437) was an Irish cleric and judge, who held office as Lord Chancellor of Ireland.

He was appointed Archdeacon of Meath and parson of the parish of St. Columba's, Kells, which was attached to the Archdeaconry, in 1412. In 1415 the Crown pardoned him for any illegal intrusions he had made into the lands attached to St. Columba's, and granted to him and to all his successors as Archdeacon the right to hold the lands in question quietly and without disturbance. In the same year John Young, presumably a close relative of William, was granted certain lands in County Meath formerly held by him. William was also a relative (possibly a brother) of James Yong (died c.1425), the political writer and staunch supporter of James Butler, 4th Earl of Ormonde. Whether William was related to Thomas Yong, Prior of Mullingar in the 1430s, is unclear.

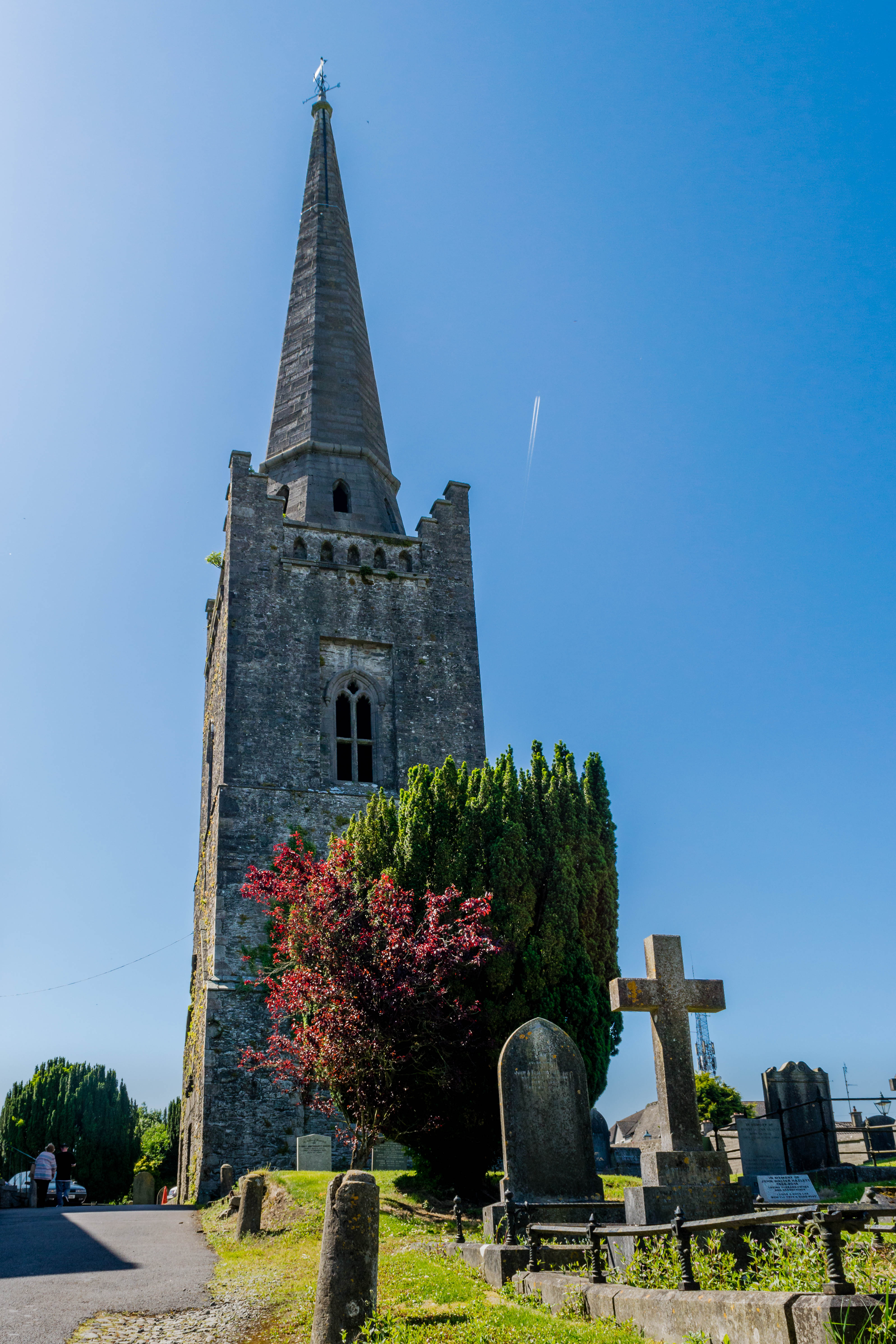
St. Columba's Church, Kells: the parish was attached to the Archdeaconry

He was Lord Chancellor of Ireland sometime between 1418 and 1422; as so often in this period there is confusion over the precise dates on which he held office. Smyth, writing in 1839, had seen his Patent of Appointment as Lord Chancellor dated 19 October 1422 (the original was presumably destroyed in the Public Records Office fire of 1922). His tenure as Lord Chancellor seems to have been brief. However he had enough knowledge of the law to be subsequently appointed one of the justices and Keepers of the Peace for County Meath in 1426.

In 1430 the Crown granted him custody of the manor of Portlester in Meath during the minority of the heir, Richard, Duke of York. In 1435 he objected to the appointment of Robert Dyke, Archdeacon of Dublin, as rector of St. Patrick's Church, Trim, County Meath (now Trim Cathedral). Yonge had his own candidate, John Ardagh, one of his chaplains, but the Crown preferred Dyke, who had an exceptionally long and distinguished career as a public servant, culminating in his appointment as Lord Treasurer of Ireland in 1444.

Yonge's date of death is generally agreed to have been 1437.

== Sources ==
- Ball, F. Elrington The Judges in Ireland 1221-1921 London John Murray 1926
- Potterton, Michael The Archaeology and History of Medieval Trim, County Meath Ph.D. Thesis National University of Ireland Maynooth 2003
- Smyth, Constantine Joseph Chronicle of the Law Officers of Ireland London Butterworths 1839
