= Robert FitzRery =

Irish landowner and judge

Robert Fitzrery (died after 1472 ) was an Irish Law Officer, landowner and judge of the fifteenth century. He was a gifted lawyer, and also suggests a shrewd and acquisitive man of business.

== Family ==
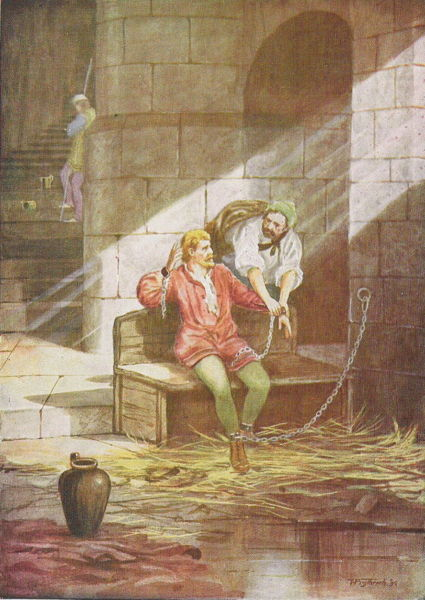
Gruffudd ap Cynan, King of Gwynedd, an imagined likeness from 1900. The FitzRery family claimed descent from him.

He was born at Swords, County Dublin. The FitzRerys were a long-established family of Welsh origin who came to Ireland before the Anglo-Norman invasion of Ireland and settled at Cloghran in Swords, where they remained substantial landowners until the seventeenth century. Their claim to be descended from the twelfth-century Welsh ruler Gruffudd ap Cynan, King of Gwynedd (1055-1137), is not implausible since Gruffudd was born in Swords to an Irish mother, had numerous non-marital children, and retained close links with Dublin in later life.

John FitzRery was Clerk of the Wages for Munster before 1374, and Chief Escheator of Ireland c.1375-1382. He was reappointed Escheator, Clerk of the Markets and Keeper of Weights and Measures in 1388.

One branch of the family settled at Kinsallagh, near the borders of County Dublin and County Meath, where Peter FitzRery in 1475 had a substantial land holding, which later passed by marriage into the Fleming family.

== Marriage and property dealings ==
Robert married c.1444 Joan White (or Whyte), widow of Peter Dowdall of Drogheda. The couple seem to have lived mainly in Drogheda. They jointly owned several properties, including one in Drogheda which they leased to John Field and his wife Margaret Woodman in 1451, and another in Dundalk which they leased to William Allyr in the same year. Robert was the sole lessor of a property, probably in County Louth, which he leased to Sir Robert Dowdall, the Chief Justice of the Irish Common Pleas (possibly a relative of Joan' first husband), in 1446. Simon FitzRery, Mayor of Dublin 1465–6, joined with Robert and the wealthy merchant Patrick FitzLeones in a lease from the Dean of St Patrick's Cathedral, Dublin of the profits of the prebend of Lusk in 1472. Simon was probably a close relative of Robert. In 1468 John Plunket entered a bond to repay FitzRery £50.

About 5 years after the death of Joan's first husband Peter Dowdall, Robert and Joan revived a long-running lawsuit which she and Dowdall has begun in about 1438, claiming ownership of a watermill at Castlecooley on the Cooley peninsula in County Louth. Significantly, Robert and Joan renewed their suit in August 1449, when Richard, Duke of York, the newly arrived Lord Lieutenant of Ireland, who a few years later claimed the English throne, was at Drogheda to conduct sensitive political negotiations with the Gaelic clans of Ulster. It has been suggested that Robert and Joan were prepared to offer York their political support in return for his assistance with their efforts to peacefully obtain possession of the disputed property, which is a tribute to their business acumen and political sense.

== Career ==
The first record of his professional life is in 1447, when James Butler, 4th Earl of Ormonde, probably the most powerful Anglo-Irish magnate of his time, appointed him his attorney in all his lawsuits. The choice of FitzRery for such an onerous employment suggests that he was already highly regarded as a lawyer.

He was appointed Attorney-General for Ireland in 1450, and almost immediately obtained a supplement to his annual salary in the amount of 100 shillings a year charged on the Crown rents of Chapelizod and Leixlip. Both he and the King's Serjeant, Thomas Snetterby, complained that the fixed salary for a law officer (£9 a year) was grossly inadequate given their onerous workload, as had Snetterby's predecessor, Edward Somerton, and all three men received the increase requested. There was perhaps less justification in FitzRery's case since the Attorney-General, unlike the Serjeant, was not obliged to attend meetings of Parliament and the Privy Council of Ireland at his own expense.

He held office as Attorney General until 1463. Though no patent seems to survive for his appointment to the Bench, a statute of the Irish Parliament of 1471-72 describes him as a justice of the Court of Common Pleas (Ireland). However a lease to which he was a party dated 1472 describes him as a narrator. This term usually meant a barrister, though it might also mean King's Serjeant-at-law, suggesting that his tenure on the Bench had been a short one. His date of death is not recorded.

== Sources ==
- Curtis, E. (1921) The FitzRerys, Welsh Lords of Cloghran, Co. Dublin Journal of the County Louth Archaeological Society Vol. 5
- Hart, A.R. A History of the King's Serjeant at law in Ireland Dublin Four Courts Press 2000
- National Library of Ireland
- Report of the Deputy Keeper of Public Records in Ireland Vol.19
- Smith, Brendan Crisis and Survival in Late Medieval Ireland: the English of Louth and their Neighbours 1330-1450 Oxford University Press 2013
- Statute Law Revision Act 2007
