= James Uriell =

Irish landowner and judge

James (or Jacob) Uriell (died c.1424) was an Irish landowner and judge who held office very briefly as Chief Baron of the Irish Exchequer.

== Background ==
He was born in County Dublin, the son of Thomas Uriell, a landowner. The Uriells were an Anglo-Norman family who originally settled in County Louth and are thought to have taken their surname from the Kingdom of Oriel.

== Career ==
James was made King's Serjeant in 1406. He was appointed as an acting justice (one of three) in a case of novel disseisin the same year, between Thomas Marward and Francis Feypo, each of whom claimed the title Baron Skryne and the lands that went with the title. He also sat on an inquisition requested by the Abbot of St. Mary's Abbey, Dublin into the boundaries of the township of Kilternan, which belonged to the Abbey. In 1409 he was appointed to a three-man commission, together with William Tynbegh, Deputy Lord High Treasurer of Ireland and Walter Tyrrell, Sheriff of County Dublin, to inquire into the export of foodstuffs from Ireland without a royal licence. In the same year he and Tynbegh were two of the five judges who heard a case of novel disseisin brought by Nicholas Duffe, chaplain, against the High Sheriff of Meath. In 1412 the Crown made him a gift of land at Kentstown, County Meath. In 1415 he sat on another panel to hear an action of the same kind against Alice Brown. He became Chief Baron in December 1419 "so long as he was of good behaviour", with the usual fee of £40 a year, but retired from the Bench less than a year later. Shortly before he retired he witnessed the charter by which King Henry V guaranteed the liberties of the citizens of Dublin. On an unspecified date, most likely in 1421, he sat as an acting justice with Sir Laurence Merbury and John Blakeney on a commission of inquiry into the inheritance of the lands of Rathfeigh, County Meath, held by the Bathe family. It is interesting that Uriell's only daughter and heiress Catherine married into that family.

He is someone said to have died later in 1421, but it was more likely to have been two years later, since his daughter did not receive seisin of the lands until 1424. The subsequent inquisition into his estates shows that he was a very substantial landowner in Counties Meath and Dublin, holding the manors of Turvey, Kilbride and Swords among others. In 1412 the Crown granted him 2 acres of land at Kentstown, County Meath and in 1415 an estate at Parsonstown in County Kildare. His lands at Swords passed to Richard Uriell, who was clearly a close relative, but not his son.

== Family ==
He was married and had a daughter and heiress, Catherine, who married firstly Robert Derpatrick (died 1419), Lord of the Manor of Stillorgan, who was the grandson of the prominent landowner and politician, Sir John Cruys of Thorncastle. They had at least one daughter Alice. The leading politician and judge Christopher Bernevall of Crickstown was given the right to arrange her marriage in 1424.

Catherine in 1422 was granted as her dower part of the woods of Stillorgan and one-third of the profits of the watermill there. Catherine married secondly, "a long time before the death of her father", Bartholemew de Bathe of Rathfeigh and Drumcondra, Dublin, and had at least three further children: the Uriell lands passed by inheritance to her eldest son by Bartholemew, Sir William de Bathe. The Bathes remained the leading landowning family in Drumcondra until the seventeenth century.

William Tynbegh, Uriell's colleague and predecessor as Chief Baron, was appointed by the Crown as keeper of the manor of Stillorgan during the minority of Stephen Derpatrick, Robert's brother and male heir. Stephen died before 1423; his heir was outlawed for an unspecified crime in 1439 and his property forfeit to the Crown, which restored it to the Cruys family. Catherine and Bartholemew were awarded seisin of her father's estates in 1424.
