= Atterby =

Hamlet in Lincolnshire, England

Coordinates: 53.4247°N 0.52384°W

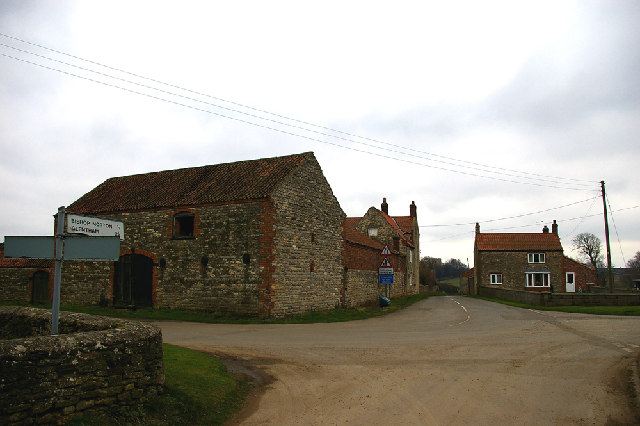
- Atterby

- Location within Lincolnshire
- OS grid reference: SK981930
  - London: 130 mi (210 km) S
- Civil parish: Bishop Norton
- District: West Lindsey
- Shire county: Lincolnshire
- Region: East Midlands
- Country: England
- Sovereign state: United Kingdom
- Post town: Market Rasen
- Postcode district: LN8
- Dialling code: 01673
- Police: Lincolnshire
- Fire: Lincolnshire
- Ambulance: East Midlands
- UK Parliament: Gainsborough

Atterby is a hamlet in the civil parish of Bishop Norton, in the West Lindsey district of Lincolnshire, England. It lies 1 mile (1.6 km) north of Bishop Norton.

== History ==
In 1931 the parish had a population of 82. Atterby was formerly a township in the parish of Bishop-Norton, in 1866 Atterby became a civil parish, on 1 April 1936 the parish was abolished and merged with Bishop Norton.

Atterby is now little more than a cluster of buildings at a crossroads; in the 19th century it was larger with 134 inhabitants, a butcher, shop and a carrier.

By the early 20th century the Everett family had established a bus service, initially with a horse drawn omnibus and later as pioneers in the use of motorised buses. One of their early vehicles was the "Silver Queen". Everett's buses operated in the local area for many years until quite recently. In 2006 JD Everett is still in the village but as a haulage company.

Grade II listed Atterby Mill lies towards the A15 along a private road. It was powered by water from Atterby Beck (which separates the hamlet from Bishop Norton) supplemented by a steam engine. It produced animal feed ground from grain. It was built on the site of a medieval mill. Nearby was the site of an old post windmill, long abandoned.
