= Thomas de Snyterby =

English-born Irish official and cleric

Thomas de Snyterby (died 1316) was an English-born Crown official, cleric and judge in Ireland, in the reign of King Edward I of England. He was the first of several judges in Ireland belonging to the same family.

Church of St Nicholas, Snitterby; Thomas was born in Snitterby and took his surname from it

== Early career ==
He was a native of the village of Snitterby in Lincolnshire and took his surname from his birthplace. His family name was occasionally spelt de Sueterby. By the early 1280s, he was a Crown servant in good standing, and he attended to the King while he was in Gascony. He was sent to Ireland in 1285 (and nominated attorneys to act in his absence) but made regular visits back to England. He became a prebendary, and later a canon, of St Patrick's Cathedral, Dublin. In 1293 he was nominated to act as attorney for the Archbishop of Dublin, John de Sandford, who was absent in England. He had a house and garden in central Dublin, near the Abbey of Saint Thomas the Martyr, in the Dublin Liberties. His relations with the Abbey were bad, and resulted in litigation over a case of assault by one of his servants, the background to which was the judge's attempts to make use of Abbey's sluices to supplement his own inadequate water supply.

In 1305 the Crown granted him lands at "Torragh", which appears to have been Turra, County Carlow.

== Judge ==
He was a justice of the Court of Common Pleas (Ireland) from 1295 to 1307 He served on the Court under the acting Chief Justice, the Dean of St Patrick's, Thomas de Chaddesworth, and then under Sir Richard de Exeter. He had administrative and military duties as well as judicial: for example, he was entrusted with paying for troops and horses for the war against Scotland, and with the defences of Dublin against raids from hostile clans in County Wicklow.

In 1299 he was one of three judges who heard an action for novel disseisin, the others being Simon de Ludgate and John of Reryth. The parties were Richard son of Robert and Master William de la Ryvere, special envoy to the Gaelic clans. Judgement was given for the plaintiff.

== Conflict with Abbey of Saint Thomas ==
In 1306 he was involved in a highly embarrassing lawsuit between his servant Alan and the Abbey of Saint Thomas the Martyr, in the Dublin Liberties. Alan accused the Abbot, Richard Sweetman, of assault and false imprisonment. The Abbot in his counterclaim alleged that Alan had attacked and knocked unconscious the Abbey's miller, who had found him, on his master's instructions, opening the Abbey's sluices to supplement the inadequate water supply of Snyterby's own watermill, having done this "diverse times by night". Not surprisingly, Sweetman and Snyterby eventually decided to settle their differences out of court.

== Case of Netterville v Le Petyt ==
In 1306 and 1307 he sat with the Chief Justice Sir Richard de Exeter on a commission to hear and determine a serious charge of assault in County Meath brought against John le Petyt, whose name appears regularly in the Court records of the time as a notorious malefactor in Meath; Philip Burnell and others were also charged. The plaintiffs were the four Netterville brothers, who were the sons of Sir Nicholas de Netterville, ancestor of the Viscounts Netterville, and a colleague of Thomas and Sir Richard on the Court of Common Pleas. As far as we can determine the Court treated it as a civil matter rather than a criminal one, and the defendants were ordered to pay heavy damages.

== Last years ==
In the early 1300s, despite his clerical office, he was Constable of Castle Kevin, Annamoe, County Wicklow, a defensive fort designed to repel the O'Toole clan of County Wicklow, who raided Dublin city on a regular basis, and who burnt Castle Kevin itself twice during Thomas's tenure as Constable.

Thomas stepped down as a judge in 1307, though he was still sitting in the Easter term of that year, when judgment was given in the case of Netterville v le Petyt. He was still living in Ireland in 1310, when he travelled overseas. He then retired to Lincolnshire, where he died in 1316. Nicholas de Snyterby, who was Serjeant-at-law (Ireland) in 1316, and sat in two of the Irish Royal Courts at intervals between 1337 and about 1355, was a close relative, perhaps a nephew, of Thomas, as was yet another Irish judge, Reginald de Snyterby, who held office in the 1420s and 1430s.
