= Bishop Norton =

Village in Lincolnshire, England

Coordinates: 53.420475°N 0.520808°W

- St Peter's Church, Bishop Norton

- Location within Lincolnshire
- Population: 343 (2021)
- OS grid reference: SK983925
  - London: 130 mi (210 km) S
- District: West Lindsey
- Shire county: Lincolnshire
- Region: East Midlands
- Country: England
- Sovereign state: United Kingdom
- Post town: Market Rasen
- Postcode district: LN8
- Dialling code: 01673
- Police: Lincolnshire
- Fire: Lincolnshire
- Ambulance: East Midlands
- UK Parliament: Gainsborough

Bishop Norton is a village and the main settlement of the civil parish of the same name in the West Lindsey district of Lincolnshire, England. The village is approximately 8 miles (13 km) north-west from the market town of Market Rasen, and is close to the A15 road. According to the 2021 census, it had a population of 343, including Atterby, up from 308 in 2011, and 233 in 2001.

The name of Bishop Norton derives from the fact that it was the most northerly of the twelve manors belonging to the Bishop based upon his chief manor at Stow. The bishop in question since the Norman Conquest was the Bishop of Lincoln, but Bishop Norton and the twelve manors date from much earlier during the periods when the sees of Lichfield, Leicester, Lindsey (Sidnacester) or Dorchester (on-Thames) respectively governed the ecclesiastical life of the area.

The name of Bishop Norton appears variously in the record as Nortune, Nortun, Bishop's Norton, and Norton Episcopi. Until 1974, when West Lindsey District Council was formed, Bishop Norton civil parish had been a constituent part the Caistor Rural District.

== Parish of Bishop Norton ==
Bishop Norton is a civil parish and a very ancient ecclesiastical parish. The parish is bounded in the east by the old course of the river Ancholme, in the west by the line of the Roman road known as Ermine Street. It is bounded in the north by the parish of Snitterby, the south by Glentham. Across the Ancholme are Osgodby and Owersby parishes. Across the Roman road, to the west, is Hemswell Cliff civil parish.

Historically this parish has included three manors. The oldest of these was the manor of the bishop, which possibly dates back to the eighth century, and almost certainly to the ninth. This was administered as part of the larger estate based on Stow, one of twelve manors until the see of Lincoln was established after the Norman Conquest. After that date, the main manor was retained by the bishop including most of the lands pertaining to it, but a new manor was established some time after for the benefit of the Prebend of Bishop Norton. This second manor held the advowson of the Church and claimed the petty tithes from the whole parish. This Prebendary manor supported the Prebend of Bishop Norton who was one of the senior clerics who formed the Chapter for the cathedral church at Lincoln.

The third manor was one which seems to have been established quite late, since in England manors were not created after the Twelfth century, the manor of Crossholme seems to date from that century. It was based upon the now extinct village or hamlet of Crossholme which was sited between Bishop Norton and nearby Glentham. The centre of the site is estimated to have been at SK 99279 91810. Various evidence for the settlement have been found including various artefacts, cropmarks and historical record. The manor existed into the twentieth century, records at least up to 1924. The site had now been levelled by ploughing out by 1964. The Lords of the Manor in the fourteenth century were recorded in various Feet of Fines as holding property in Lincoln as part of the manor. The name of Crossholme now only exists as a farm name at the eastern end of Bishop Norton village.

In addition to the manors, the settlements within the modern day civil parish include, Bishop Norton, the hamlet of Atterby, and that part of Spital-in-the-Street which lies north of Mellows Beck and east of the centre of Ermine Street (A15). Additionally there are good number of more isolated farmsteads within the parish, generally to the east of the village towards the river Ancholme on both Atterby and Snitterby Carrs and Low Place.

According to information provided by the Institute of Heraldic and Genealogical Studies in Canterbury, the parish registers for Bishop Norton were commenced in 1587. It also records that the parish was a peculiar in respect of the Ecclesiastical Courts in which wills were proven. The Peculiar Court for the Prebendal of Bishop Norton had jurisdiction over Bishop Norton, Atterby and all of Spital-in-the-Street. Excepting the other Prebendal Manors of Corringham, Stow, Caistor and Louth who each had their own peculiar courts, generally, the old Lindsey parishes west of the River Ancholme were under the jurisdiction of the Archdeaconry Court of Stow and those to the east came under the Consistory Court of Lincoln. Bishop Norton's immediate neighbour to the south, Glentham, was one of several parishes forming another peculiar, the Peculiar of the Dean and Chapter of Lincoln. The fact that the Prebendary of Bishop Norton, from the creation of the separate manor until the church commissioners took charge of the property associated with it in January 1868, held the advowson of the church. This along with the Peculiar Court gives good reason why the Vicar at St Peter's in Bishop Norton was also responsible for the Chapel at Spital-in-the-Street, despite it not being within the parish.

The parish church of St Peter's is a relatively modern construction, possibly from about 1737, but with earlier artefacts within the fabric, such as the Twelfth century Tympanum inserted within an internal wall. It is unclear whether an earlier church stood on the site of the current one, but it is certain that a church did exist here from the earliest days of the bishop's manor. A medieval boundary ditch that may, or may not, have belonged to an earlier church dated to between 1066 and 1500 was discovered in substrate deposits on the site. During building work in 1895 various artefacts were unearthed from various historic periods including the Middle Saxon period and also an even older boundary ditch. Middle Saxon finds from the ninth and tenth century have been found here and in other places immediately adjacent to the church grounds. This included a ninth century shard from a Maxey ware strainer from the ninth century which was discovered in the garden of 3 Archer Street in 2004.

== Administration ==
Bishop Norton is part of the Waddingham and Spital ward of West Lindsey District Council's area, and a constituent of the Ancholme Cliff division for Lincolnshire County Council. The parish has a Parish Council.

Historically, the county of Lincoln was divided into three parts; Bishop Norton was in the Parts of Lindsey, which covered all of that part of the county of Lincoln from Lincoln to the Humber. Lindsey County Council, created in 1889 was abolished in 1974 when West Lindsey district was created. Prior to the formation of the county council in 1889 the system of local government was fractured and dependent on many different structures. Like Yorkshire, Lindsey too, during the so-called Danelaw period, adopted the structure of Manor/ Wapentake /Riding (being a third part of the Parts of Lindsey). Bishop Norton was in the Wapentake of Aslacoe, in the West Riding of the Parts of Lindsey. The other important factors in local government throughout the post-medieval was the parish and the justices in their sessions.

=== Buildings ===
The current church is a Grade II* listed building. In addition there are within the village three buildings with Grade II listings; Archer House, The Bakehouse and the Old School. Within the wider parish there is one Grade I listed building, Norton Place, which is described below. There are four further listed buildings; three are subsidiary buildings of Norton Place, and on that estate, south of Bishop Norton. The fourth is Atterby Mill, an early nineteenth century water mill on the Atterby Beck. The Lincolnshire Historic Environment Record records that it is a three-storey brick corn mill, rectangular in plan and dated '1802' in iron ties at the north end. A large iron wheel is on the exterior of the west elevation at the first floor level. This indicates that in later years it could be worked by traction engine or tractor. The leat has been infilled. The mill was last known to have been worked during the Second World War.

English Heritage carried out a survey of farmsteads and identified twenty-seven that were extant in the nineteenth century. Many are now demolished or partly demolished. Two within the centre of the village have been entirely demolished, but new houses have been built to replace them and the names are retained at Roseland House and Manor House, both in Archer Street. Several on the Carrs have been demolished, but most remain as extant buildings, albeit, not always as working farms and several with significant changes to the buildings.

There are barns noted in both the Farmstead survey and in the HER, including a range of barns at Crossholme Farm, the most easterly of which was reputedly the parish Pinfold. The house named The Barns in Pingle Lane includes a number of former farm buildings of different ages, and these are included in the HER.

== Norton Place ==
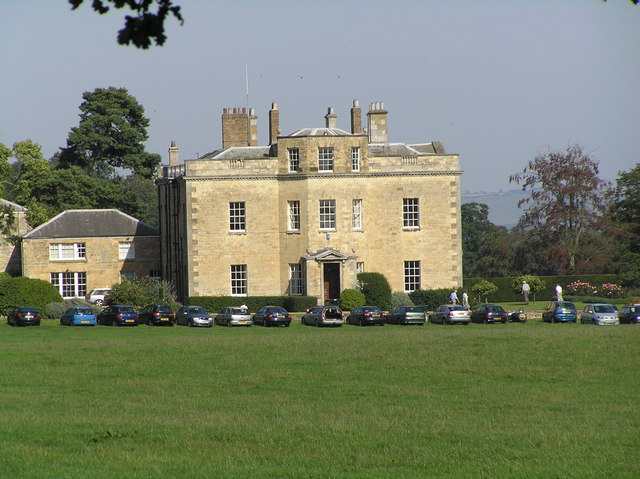
The Georgian facade of Norton Place, designed by John Carr in 1776.

The most notable house in Bishop Norton is Norton Place. It is listed as Grade I and is by the York Architect John Carr. Norton Place is set on the edge of plantations in former parkland which was laid out in the 1770s. The house was built for John Harrison MP by John Carr in 1776. The main front of the house has a stone south facade of seven bays and has two storeys, the three centre bays more widely spaced beneath a pediment. The entrance is a Doric porch with Venetian window above, and above that in the pediment is a circular light garlanded with foliage and tied up with a bow. The side fronts have deep canted bays, a favourite Carr device, topped with urns. The drawing room has a delicate oval-pattern plaster ceiling with inset Wedgwood plaques depicting antique heads. The stables make a courtyard to the rear. There were some alterations to house in the 1830s by Lewis Vulliamy for Sir Montagu Cholmeley, who was the grandson of John Harrison.

== Archaeology in Bishop Norton ==
The Lincolnshire Historic Environment Record (HER) provides an enormous amount of detail finds and a great deal of information relating to cropmarks, aerial photography since 1946 and of structures that have been discovered mainly during contemporary works. Some eighty-six records are held in the HER for the parish of Bishop Norton, within which the oldest 'find' is recorded in record 50829: an Acheulian handaxe from the Lower Paleolithic period (500,000 BC to 15001 BC) was found in 1954 by a farm labourer, on a hummock of sand and gravel on Atterby Carr near the river Ancholme. There are many records of finds and cropmarks linked to the Neolithic period (4000 BC – 2351 BC). These are generally, but not exclusively at the eastern end of the parish, suggesting that the river was the important natural feature for people at that time. Not surprisingly, it might have provided a 'highway', as well as a means of providing food. These records describe possible permanent settlement sites as well as small finds scattered around.

The Bronze Age is well represented around the parish with several sites of finds and a possible small settlement just to the south of the village of Bishop Norton, with further cropmarks of the same age a little further south alongside the Glentham Road. There appears to be less recorded from the Iron Age, however, since it is difficult to discern a clear cut-off point in the habits and culture of British people between the Iron Age and the Roman period, that is not too surprising.

The Roman period is well represented in the record. At Low Place on Cross Lane there is evidence of a Romano-British settlement or large farmstead; given the high number of Neolithic finds locally, there is, perhaps, reason to suppose that there may have been continuity of settlement here at that time for a thousand years or more. At the western end of the parish between the modern village and Atterby mill there is evidence of both a villa and a possible Roman settlement. between that site (on record 50547) and of a branch of the Ermine Street running towards it on record 50574. Given that Lincoln was a colonia, is it possible that this was a settlement of one or more former legionaries?

There is evidence of other settlements from the medieval period, including Crossholme and at Atterby. Besides these, there is evidence of a medieval mill dam on the Atterby Beck close to Atterby Mill, suggesting that this site had been home to a water mill for a long period before 1802. The entry for Bishop Norton in Domesday shows that the Bishop owned a mill as part of his manor here.

Later material in the HER includes post-medieval structures and finds, including evidence of a windmill on Atterby Lane not far from the old water mill. The only human remains were a couple of bone fragments in a pit alongside Main Street.

What is clear in these records is the sheer scale and spread of the finds making the probability of archaeology throughout the parish rank highly. The fact that there has been so many identified sites and finds despite a lack of organised archaeological excavation or other investigations, suggests that the number of recorded sites would almost certainly grow significantly if they were to occur.
