= John Bennet (mayor) =

Mayor of Dublin, Ireland

John Bennet (died before 1479) was a fifteenth-century Mayor of Dublin. He held office as Mayor from 1456 to 1467. He was a landowner in counties Dublin and Kildare. He was probably the John Bennet who sued the Prior of the Order of Hospitallers at Kilmainham for debt in 1453.

He married Joanna de Snyterby, only daughter and heiress of Reginald de Snyterby (died c.1436), who was appointed second Baron of the Court of Exchequer (Ireland) in 1424. The de Snyterby (or Sueterby) family were natives of Snitterby in Lincolnshire, and also had strong Irish connections: Reginald was the third member of the family to hold high judicial office in Ireland. John and Joanna had at least one son Thomas, who married Elizabeth Bellew.

Snitterby, Lincolnshire, birthplace of John's father-in-law, Reginald de Snyterby

John had died by 1479, when his son Thomas granted his lands at Ballymore, County Kildare, to the Prior of the Cathedral of the Holy Trinity, Dublin (now Christ Church Cathedral). The profits from the lands were to be used to pay for four choristers (professional singers), to sing at divine services for the repose of the souls of Thomas, his wife, and his parents.

John's widow Joanna was still alive in 1484, when she, like her son previously, made a grant of lands in County Dublin to the Prior of Holy Trinity Cathedral.

== Sources ==
- Ball, F. Elrington The Judges in Ireland 1221-1921 London John Murray 1926
- Close Rolls 5 Henry VI
- Patent Rolls 13 Henry VI
- Statutes of the Parliament of Ireland 1453-4
- Twentieth Report of the Deputy Keeper of Public Records in Ireland Dublin Alexander Thom and Co 1885
