= Giles Thorndon =

Giles Thorndon (c. 1388 – August 1477) was a senior official of the English Crown in the fifteenth century, who was noted for his long and loyal service to the House of Lancaster and for his troubled and unsuccessful career as Lord Treasurer of Ireland.

== Early career ==
He was born in Newcastle upon Tyne shortly before 1390. Little is known of his family; there is no evidence that he was related to Roger Thornton, the long-serving mayor of Newcastle, who died in 1430.

By his own account, he entered the household of the future King Henry V in 1404, when he must still have been in his teens. He continued to serve the Prince after he became King and remained in the household of Henry VI. For several years he was the royal sewer, i.e. the household official with responsibility for overseeing the kitchens. From these household duties, he was promoted to become a senior Crown servant. In 1434 he became constable of Dublin Castle and Wicklow Castle, and for a time was also entrusted with the wardenship of Cardigan Castle. In 1437 he became Lord Treasurer of Ireland.

== Ireland: the Butler–Talbot feud ==
Fifteenth-century Irish politics was dominated for almost thirty years by the feud between the faction of James Butler, 4th Earl of Ormonde, who served for many years as the Lord Lieutenant of Ireland, on the one side, and the faction of Richard Talbot, Archbishop of Dublin and Lord Chancellor of Ireland, backed by his brother John Talbot, 1st Earl of Shrewsbury, on the other side. As the feud grew more bitter, almost all Irish Crown officials were forced to declare themselves as supporters of either the Butler or the Talbot factions.

Thorndon, in his early years in Ireland, sought to act as a mediator between the rival factions. In 1442 he produced a memorandum on the state of Irish affairs, based, as he noted, on his thirty-eight years' experience of Crown service. At this time he was making every effort to be impartial, stressing that there were faults on both sides. What really mattered, as he pointed out, were the dire results of the feud. In particular, impartial justice could not be obtained from the Courts where the interests of one faction or the other were involved, Irish Exchequer officials were not collecting Crown debts, and lavish grants of land to the supporters of whichever faction was in the ascendant had greatly depleted the Crown revenues. He proposed a number of remedies, including the strengthening of his own office and ensuring that the Chief Baron of the Irish Exchequer was a trained lawyer (Irish Barons of the Court of Exchequer then often lacked any legal qualifications).

In 1443 the Butler–Talbot feud seemed to be dying down, but in 1444 it flared up again. The immediate cause of the conflict was Thorndon's refusal to reappoint William Chevir, justice of the Court of King's Bench and a key ally of Ormonde, as his deputy. Thorndon now abandoned any effort to mediate and declared himself to be firmly on the Talbot side. He produced a string of complaints against Ormonde and Chevir, covering a wide range of examples of corruption, bribery, maladministration, and disobedience to the Crown. Ormonde responded by calling a meeting of the Council at Drogheda, where he declared that Thorndon was deemed to have vacated his office and accused him of treasonable conspiracy with the quarrelsome and litigious Thomas FitzGerald, Prior of the Order of St. John of Jerusalem at Kilmainham. He also produced a monk called Thomas Talbot, who testified that Thorndon had threatened Ormond's life, allegedly saying that: "I wish to be the first to cut his head off".

Thorndon and Prior FitzGerald fled to England, where they charged Ormonde with treason and (rather curiously) with necromancy, but the Privy Council, which was only concerned to end the feud, was unsympathetic to their complaints. No action was taken against Ormonde, and the Prior was permanently deprived of office in 1447: the Council's proposal that the Earl and the Prior settle their differences through trial by combat was vetoed personally by King Henry VI, who persuaded them to agree to a truce.

Thorndon, as far as is known, did not return to Ireland, although his later marriage to Jane d'Artois, widow of Lord Gormanston, suggests that he remained in contact with some of his former colleagues there.

== Last years ==
Despite his unhappy experiences in Ireland, it was clearly felt by the Crown that Thorndon had acquired useful knowledge of the governance of the country: in 1458 he was confirmed in office as Treasurer of Ireland. Unsurprisingly, he preferred to appoint a deputy to act in his place. He retired to Northumberland in 1460, shortly before the downfall of the Lancastrian dynasty, which he had served so long and loyally. The New Yorkist regime, which was generally in favor of reconciliation with its former opponents, left him in peace: whether he maintained contacts with the exiled Henry VI or his queen, Margaret of Anjou, is unknown. During the brief Readeption of Henry VI in 1470-1, he seems to have played no political role, probably because of his great age. He died in August 1477, aged almost ninety.

== Marriage ==
He married, sometime after 1450, when they were both rather advanced in years, Jane d'Artois, the dowager Lady Gormanston; she was the daughter of the prominent Gascony-born military commander and landowner Sir Jenico d'Artois and his first wife Joan Taaffe of Liscarton, and widow of Christopher Preston, 3rd Baron Gormanston.
