= Richard Sydgrave =

Irish judge

Richard Sydgrave or Segrave (died 1425) was an Irish judge who held office as Chief Baron of the Irish Exchequer and served as deputy to the Lord Chancellor of Ireland. His family became among the foremost landowners in County Meath, and also held lands at Newry and at Carlingford, County Louth.

An earlier member of the Seagrave family, Stephen, had been Archbishop of Armagh 1323–1333; The exact relationship between the two men is unclear. Richard was the custodian of the See of Armagh in 1404. In 1405 he was granted lands in Newry which had been forfeited by the previous owners for rebellion: the Patent Roll however notes that "Richard will not be sufficient to sustain them without aid". He was also granted lands at Burtonstown, near Navan.

His first recorded office was Clerk of the Crown and Hanaper in the late 1390s. He became a Baron of the Court of Exchequer (Ireland) in 1402 and Chief Baron in 1423; he also acted as Deputy Lord Chancellor. In 1409 he was made an acting judge on a five-man Court to hear a case of novel disseisin against the High Sheriff of Meath. In 1410 he obtained a remission for the townspeople of Carlingford, County Louth, where he was a landowner, of payment of all tallage (a tax levied by the Crown), subsidies and military expenses, due to the devastation of the town by hostile Irish and Scottish forces. There is a record of his sitting with John Fitzadam, Chief Justice of the Irish Common Pleas, in 1412 to hear a case of novel disseisin brought by Thomas Clone against William Dervoys and his wife Blanche. In 1420 he and his colleague Roger Hawkenshaw were instructed to inquire into complaints by the citizens of County Meath of extortion by the Lord Lieutenant's troops.

In 1422 the Lord Lieutenant of Ireland, Edmund Mortimer, 5th Earl of March, who was in England, nominated Sydgrave to act as one of his attorneys in Ireland.

He was ex officio a member of the Privy Council of Ireland, and seems to have been a fairly regular attendee at its meetings. Like so many senior judges in that era, he faced the claims of a rival for office, in this case James Cornwalsh, who was finally confirmed as Chief Baron in 1425, only to be murdered in 1441 during a feud with the Fitzwilliam family. His killers were pardoned, as coincidentally were the murderers of Sydgrave's eldest son some years later. Sydgrave appears to have died in 1425.

In his last years, through the marriage of his eldest son Patrick (died 1455) to the heiress Mary Wafer, the family acquired the lands of Killegland, now Ashbourne, County Meath, where they remained until the 1640s; he also held the lands at Newry which had been granted to his father and, other lands in County Galway, although it seems that he was never able to gain effective control of the Newry lands; it was noted as early as 1405 that his father could not hold them.

Patrick was murdered by Patrick White and others in 1455. His killers quickly obtained a pardon from the Parliament of Ireland, an act symptomatic of a time when the ease with which malefactors obtained pardons, even for murder, (as the case of James Cornwalsh also testified), was becoming a major social problem. Patrick's son, another Richard, was at the same time restored to his father's estates.

The Segrave connection with the Court of Exchequer continued, with two subsequent members of the family being among its Barons.
