= James Cornwalsh =

Irish judge

James Cornwalsh (died 1441) was an Irish judge who held the office of Chief Baron of the Irish Exchequer. He was a political figure of considerable importance in fifteenth-century Ireland, and a supporter of the Lord Lieutenant of Ireland, James Butler, 4th Earl of Ormond. He was murdered as a result of a feud over the possession of Baggotrath Castle, near Dublin.

== Family ==
He was born in Ireland, the son of William Cornwalsh: as their name suggests, the Cornwalsh family had come to Ireland from Cornwall in the fourteenth century. The name has several alternative spellings, such as Cornwalysch and Cornwallis. He was probably descended from Sir John de Cornwall or Cornwaille, Constable of Carlow Castle in the time of Edward III. In 1358, Sir John petitioned the Crown for redress, on the ground that his castle of Kylebelle (now vanished, it is thought to have been near Leighlinbridge), had been burned by the Irish of Leinster. He was granted £40 for repairs. John le Cornwaleys of Dublin was described as an attorney in 1310. A William Cornwall of Dublin, possibly a brother of James, was living in 1423.

James lived mainly at Dunboyne in County Meath until he moved to Dublin in his last years. He married Matilda Rochfort and by her was the father of John Cornwalsh, himself a future Chief Baron.

== Career ==
He was a justice of the peace for Wexford and Waterford in 1406, and was appointed Deputy Admiral of Ireland, serving under Sir Jenico d'Artois, in 1410. In 1412, he was appointed Admiral of Ireland for life, jointly with Patrick Cotterell. He was appointed Chief Baron in 1420 on the advice of James Butler, 4th Earl of Ormond. Irish politics was then dominated by the bitter and long-lasting feud between Ormond and the Talbot family, headed by John Talbot, 1st Earl of Shrewsbury, and Cornwalsh was a staunch adherent of Ormond. He quarrelled with the Lord Chancellor of Ireland, Sir Laurence Merbury, who accused Cornwalsh of gravely slandering him before the English Council.

Cornwalsh was suspended from office in 1423 and replaced by Richard Sydgrave, with whom he had contested the right to hold the office for several years, but he was restored in 1425. In the same year, the Irish Council sent him to London to give a favourable report on Ormond's tenure as Lord Lieutenant. He later petitioned the Council for payment of his expenses, in the amount of £36, and was duly reimbursed. In 1427, he was forgiven all his debts to the Crown, and in the same year, he was awarded 20 marks by the Crown for his labours "on the King's business" in Leinster and Munster. In 1423, he was granted a two-third share of the manor of Rathfarnham in south Dublin (Rathfarnham Castle was not yet built). In 1426, he was granted the manor of Crumlin, Dublin for eight years.

In 1434, he was placed on a high-powered judicial commission, whose members included his fellow Chief Justice, John Blakeney of the Common Pleas and his junior Baron, Reginald de Snyterby, to inquire into all suspected cases of treason in Dublin and the Pale. The same judges had sat on previous commissions, notably in 1426/7, when they tried a charge of felony against the Bishop of Meath, Edward Dantsey, who was accused of stealing a chalice from a Church in "Taveragh" (probably Tara). The Bishop vigorously maintained his innocence and was acquitted, after the case was removed to the Irish Parliament. One John Penthony later confessed to the theft, and received absolution for his sins.

In 1420, when his predecessor as Chief Baron James Fitzwilliam died, Cornwalsh was appointed guardian to Fitzwilliam's young son, Phillip; in hindsight, this was an ironic choice in light of his later murderous feud with Phillip's family.

== Death-the Baggotrath Castle feud ==
Baggotrath Castle, built by Sir Robert Bagod in about 1280, was bought by Sir Edward Perrers in about 1403. Perrers was an English-born military commander and an influential statesman, who acted as Deputy to the Lord Lieutenant of Ireland, and was a close associate of James Butler, 3rd Earl of Ormond. He owned substantial lands in County Meath and Newcastle, County Wicklow, as well as Baggotrath. He died sometime after 1424. After their only son's death in 1428, possession of Baggotrath Castle and her husband's other lands passed to Sir Edward's widow, Joanna. Under her will, made in 1440, she appointed Cornwalsh her executor, along with her chaplain Nicholas Furlong. She died at year's end 1440, and Cornwalsh entered into possession of the castle. The Crown paid him a debt of £10 charged on lands at Leixlip and Chapelizod, which had been owing to Lady Perrers at the time of her death.

His occupation of Baggotrath was deeply resented by Sir Edward Perrers' daughter Ismaye and her husband William Fitzwilliam (a cousin of Cornwalsh's former ward Phillip FitzWilliam). The Fitzwilliam family, for centuries, were the principal landowners in Dundrum and adjoining parts of Dublin, and constantly sought to expand their holdings. On 28 September 1441, when Cornwalsh had come up to Baggotrath to hold the Michaelmas assizes Fitzwilliam, according to the subsequent charges, assembled a large military force, seized the castle and murdered the Chief Baron, who was at supper with some members of his household, seemingly unaware of any danger.

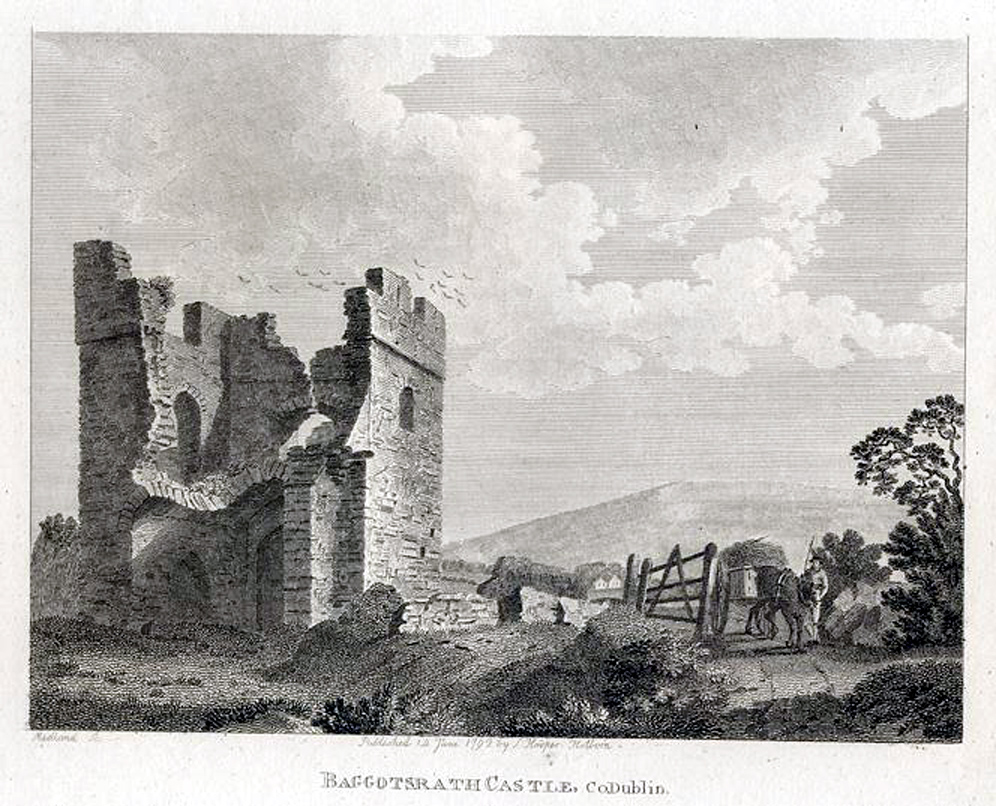
Ruins of Baggotrath Castle, c.1791

== Aftermath ==
Given the gravity of the crime and the social prominence of the victim, it is surprising that Fitzwilliam and Ismaye were soon pardoned for killing Cornwalsh, and were even allowed to retain possession of Baggotrath Castle in the short term. Elrington Ball speculated that the Crown was not satisfied as to their guilt (although public opinion at the time was clear that FitzWilliam "wickedly slew Cornwalsh") or possibly Cornwalsh's actions were seen as sufficient provocation for the crime. It was in any case quite easy to get a royal pardon from Henry VI, even for crimes as notorious as the 1455 murder of the Devonshire lawyer Nicholas Radford by Thomas Courtenay, 6th Earl of Devon, which gravely shocked English public opinion.

Elrington Ball drew the inference that "violence is indigenous to the Irish soil". There is no doubt that murder and other violent crimes were all too common in fifteenth-century Ireland, even among the ruling class: Cornwalsh's son and heir John later married Matilda, widow of Thomas Hussey, 5th Baron Galtrim, who was reputedly murdered on his own wedding day, an episode which inspired the nineteenth-century ballad "The Bride of Malahide". On the other hand, given the number of equally heinous crimes in England, such as the Radford killing, it is perhaps fairer to conclude that there was a serious breakdown of law and order in both kingdoms, which greatly weakened the authority of the Crown.

It is unclear if William and Ismaye gained anything from the crime. An inquisition of 1448 found that Ismaye was not the heiress to the Perrers estate, which should rightfully pass to the next male heir, John Hall of Southwark. William outlived Ismaye and remarried: he was dead by 1453, when his widow Joan received the King's licence required for her own remarriage. His son and heir, Thomas, was still a minor when his mother remarried.
