= Edward Dantsey =

Irish bishop and politician (c. 1370–1430)

Edward Dantsey or Dauntsey (c. 1370 - 1430) was a fifteenth-century Bishop of Meath, who also held high political office in Ireland, serving as Lord High Treasurer of Ireland and twice as Deputy to the Lord Lieutenant of Ireland. In a curious episode in 1426, he was wrongfully charged with theft, but acquitted.

== Early career ==
He was born in England. Little is known of his family background, but his closest links seem to have been with Devon and Cornwall. He was educated at the University of Oxford, where he was a student between 1390 and 1397. He studied as a lawyer as well as training for the priesthood, and graduated with several degrees in law and divinity. He became a deacon in 1392 and was ordained a priest before 1412. He held several benefices in the Diocese of Exeter, and was Archdeacon of Cornwall from 1397 to 1412. He became Bishop of Meath in the latter year and received the temporalities of the Diocese in 1413. He became a member of the Privy Council of Ireland , and his name appears frequently in its records, especially in the early 1420s.

== Bishop of Meath: the Talbot-Butler feud ==
Irish politics for many years after 1420 was dominated by the feud between the Butler and Talbot factions, and almost all public figures were forced to take one side or the other in the feud. Dantsey attempted at first to remain neutral but soon sided with the Butlers, headed by James Butler, 4th Earl of Ormond, who was Lord Lieutenant in 1420 and 1425. This inevitably led to a clash with the formidable and hot-tempered Richard Talbot, who rather awkwardly for Dantsey was his spiritual superior as Archbishop of Dublin: Talbot with his brother John Talbot, 1st Earl of Shrewsbury, headed the opposing Talbot faction. In 1423 when the Lord Lieutenant, Edmund Mortimer, 5th Earl of March, who spent much of his time in England, appointed Dantsey his Lord Deputy, Talbot tried to block the appointment, on the grounds that he lacked the proper credentials, but without success. As Lord Deputy, Dantsey summoned a session of the Irish Parliament.

== Trial for felony ==
Relations between the two bishops improved, and Dantsey was evidently willing to invoke Talbot's aid, as well as that of the Archbishop of Armagh, during the curious episode in 1426/7 when he was indicted for felony, in that he had stolen a chalice from the parish church of Taveragh (Tara), County Meath. The matter was considered sufficiently serious for a high powered judicial commission headed by two of the three Chief Justices, John Blakeney and James Cornwalsh, to sit at Trim in the autumn of 1426 to hear the matter. They remitted the case to the Irish Parliament. Dantsey vigorously maintained his innocence, and invoked the authority of the Archbishop of Armagh, John Swayne, and that of the Archbishop of Dublin, to deal with cases involving spiritual peers. Parliament in the spring of 1327 referred the matter to the Archbishop of Armagh, and Dantsey was acquitted. The not guilty verdict was undoubtedly right: it appears that the real thief was one John Penthony, who later confessed to the crime. Dantsey generously forgave him, and he received absolution from the Archbishop of Armagh.

== Later years ==
The episode does not seem to have damaged the Bishop's reputation, presumably because no one really believed him guilty of the felony he was charged with. He was Lord Treasurer in 1426/7, and served a second term as Deputy to the new Lord Lieutenant, Sir John Grey, in 1427-8. He may have been the author of a 1428 report to the English Privy Council on the state of Ireland: the report makes some effort to be fair to all sides, while unsuccessfully pressing the claims of Ormond, whom Grey had replaced as Lord Lieutenant, to be reappointed to the office.

He spent his last years in retirement in his diocese, where he died at the very beginning of 1430.

== Character ==
From the limited evidence about his personality, he seems to have been a man of upright character, who was held in high regard by the English Crown. As Archbishop Healy remarks in his History of the Diocese of Meath, it is to his credit that he forgave Penthony, the man whose crime he has been falsely accused of and tried for.

== Sources ==
- Beresford, David "Dauntsey, Edward" Cambridge Dictionary of Irish Biography 2009
- Close Rolls Henry VI
- John Healy, Archbishop of Tuam History of the Diocese of Meath Dawson Street Dublin 1908
- Otway-Ruthven, A. J. A History of Medieval Ireland Barnes and Noble reissue New York 1993
