= Laurence Merbury =

English-born statesman in Ireland

Sir Laurence Merbury (died after 1423) was an English-born statesman in Ireland who held the office of Treasurer of Ireland and was also Deputy to the Lord Chancellor of Ireland.

== Family ==
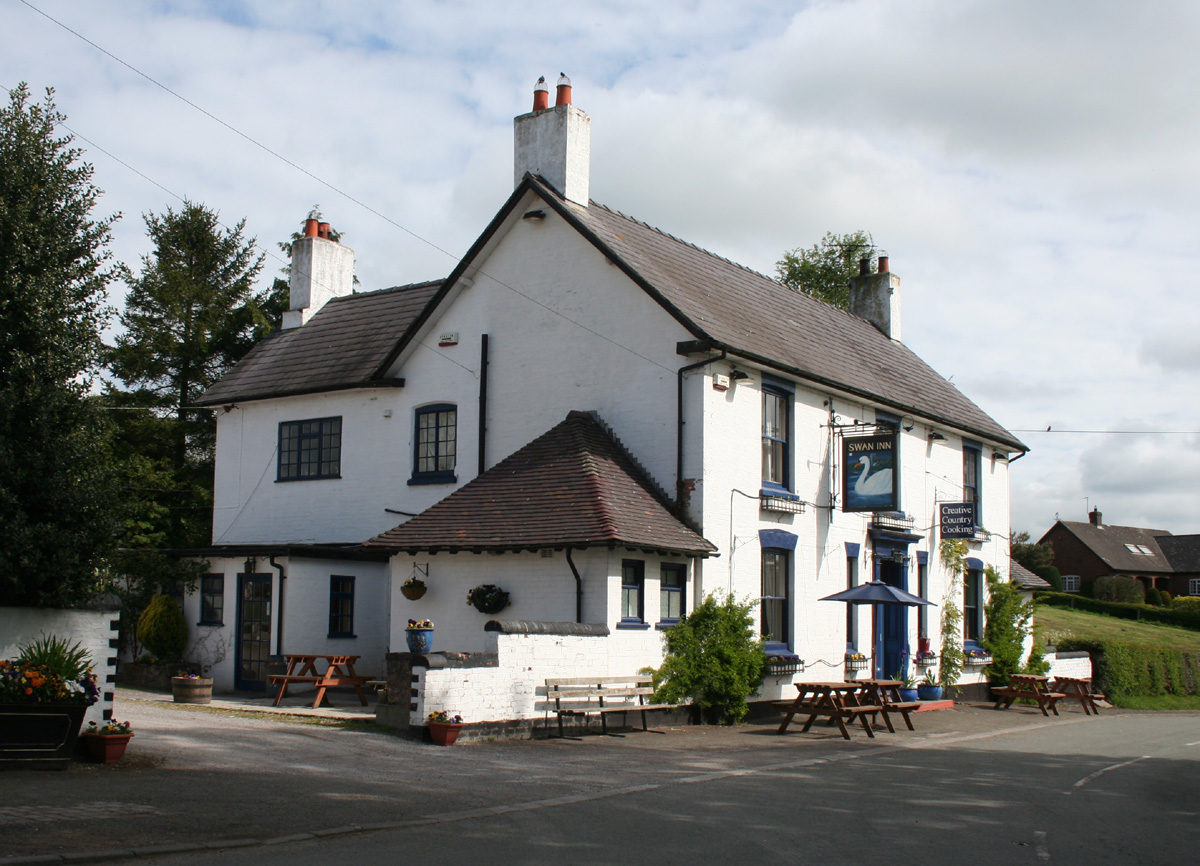
Marbury, Cheshire, present day

He was born at Marbury, Cheshire, one of the three sons of Sir Thomas Merbury, who also had estates in Nottinghamshire. The Talbot family, who gained the title Earl of Shrewsbury, were Lords of the Manor of Marbury. Laurence was always a staunch supporter of the Talbots in politics. He was the brother of John Merbury (died 1437), MP for Herefordshire and of Nicholas Merbury (died 1421), Master General of the Ordnance and Chief Butler of England.

Laurence served as High Sheriff of Cheshire in 1412. He appears to have enjoyed royal favour as early as 1399, being described as a "retainer for life" of the English Crown. His brother Nicholas on the other hand was seen as hostile to King Henry IV in the first years of his reign, but was reconciled with the King in 1402.

== Career in Ireland ==
Laurence was granted an annuity from the customs of Drogheda. He is first heard of in Ireland in 1402 when he was serving as Treasurer. From 1403 to 1410 he acted frequently as Deputy to the Lord Chancellor, Thomas Cranley, who was often unable through old age, ill-health or pressure of business to carry out his duties as Chancellor. He acted as Deputy again in 1417, and was Treasurer in 1412–1413. O'Flanagan suggests that his record as Deputy was subject to criticism: when Cranley was asked to present a memorial to the Crown on the state of Government in Ireland, Merbury caused controversy by refusing to affix the Great Seal of Ireland to it, apparently on the ground that some of the complaints were directed against him personally. Cranley was opposed by the "Patriotic Party", led by the powerful 4th Earl of Ormond. Several of its supporters were indicted by Talbot. In the meantime, Sir Laurence Merbury refused to take the Memorandum of Complaints to London. As acting Chancellor of Ireland, Sir Laurence held the Great Seal, with the attendant authority. Cranley always supported the English Viceroy. In 1420 Merbury witnessed the charter by which King Henry V guaranteed the liberties of the citizens of Dublin.

== Conflict ==
Otway-Ruthven suggests that he was a victim of the Butler–Talbot feud which dominated Irish politics for almost thirty years. The feud resulted in virtually all Irish public figures supporting either the Butler family, headed by James Butler, 4th Earl of Ormond, or the Talbot family, headed by John Talbot, 1st Earl of Shrewsbury and his brother Richard Talbot, Archbishop of Dublin. Merbury was a supporter of the Talbots (naturally enough since he grew up on a Talbot manor), and as such was strongly attacked by the Ormond faction, including James Cornwalsh, the Chief Baron of the Irish Exchequer, whom Merbury accused of grossly slandering him before the English Privy Council. Cornwalsh was suspended from office for a time, but the fact that Merbury left Ireland soon after suggests that he was unable to withstand the attacks on his integrity, whether these were justified or not.

== Heirs ==
Little is known of his later years: he was probably dead by 1437, since he is not mentioned in his brothers John's will of that year. Laurence himself had inherited his brother Nicholas's estates on the latter's death in 1421. Since Laurence apparently had no children, presumably his estates passed to John's daughter and heiress Elizabeth and her husband Sir Walter Devereux, a future Lord Chancellor of Ireland. Their descendants held the title Baron Ferrers of Chartley.
