= Richard Talbot (archbishop of Dublin) =

English-born statesman and cleric

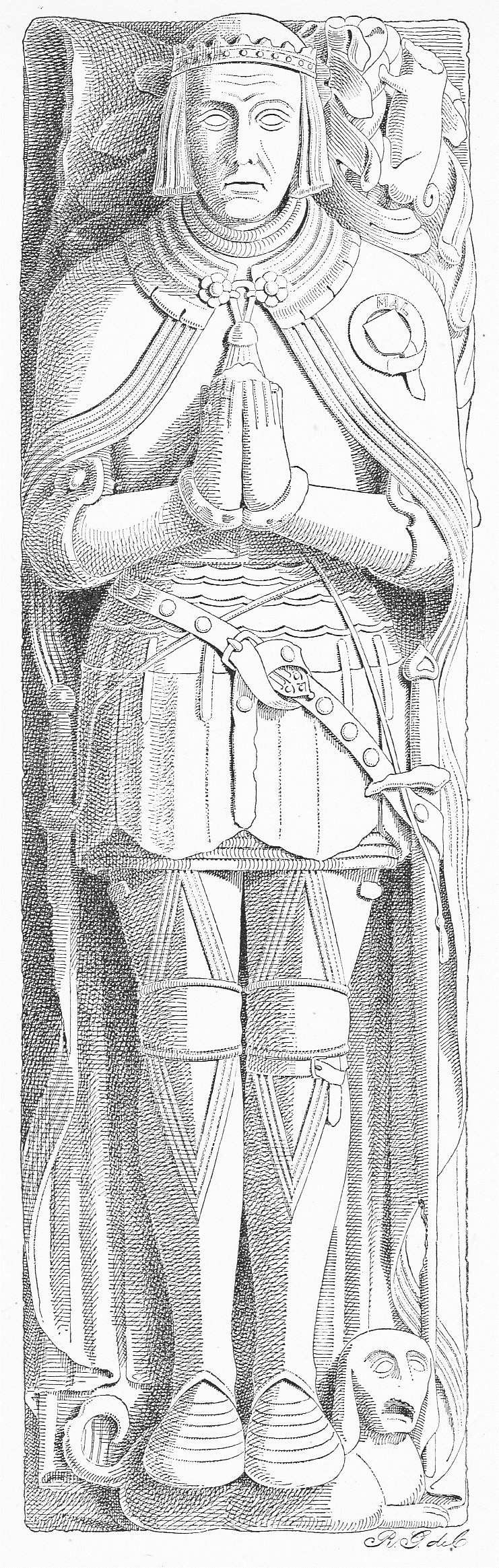
John Talbot, 1st Earl of Shrewsbury, elder brother of Richard Talbot, who was John's strongest political ally.

Richard Talbot (c. 1390 – 15 August 1449) was an English-born statesman and cleric in fifteenth-century Ireland. He was a younger brother of John Talbot, 1st Earl of Shrewsbury. He held the offices of Archbishop of Dublin and Lord Chancellor of Ireland. He was one of the leading political figures in Ireland for more than thirty years, but his career was marked by controversy and frequent conflicts with other statesmen. In particular, the Talbot brothers' quarrel with the powerful Earl of Ormonde was the main cause of the Butler–Talbot feud, which dominated Irish politics for decades, and seriously weakened the authority of the English Crown in Ireland.

== Early life ==
He was the third son of Richard Talbot, 4th Baron Talbot, and his wife Ankaret le Strange. His elder brothers were Gilbert Talbot, 5th Baron Talbot and John Talbot, 1st Earl of Shrewsbury. He seems to have entered the Church while he was still in his early teens. He became prebendary of Hereford Cathedral and York Cathedral, and Dean of Chichester in 1415. In 1416, when he was still only about twenty-five, he was elected Archbishop of Armagh but failed to secure Papal confirmation of his election. The following year he was consecrated Archbishop of Dublin.

== Archbishop of Dublin ==
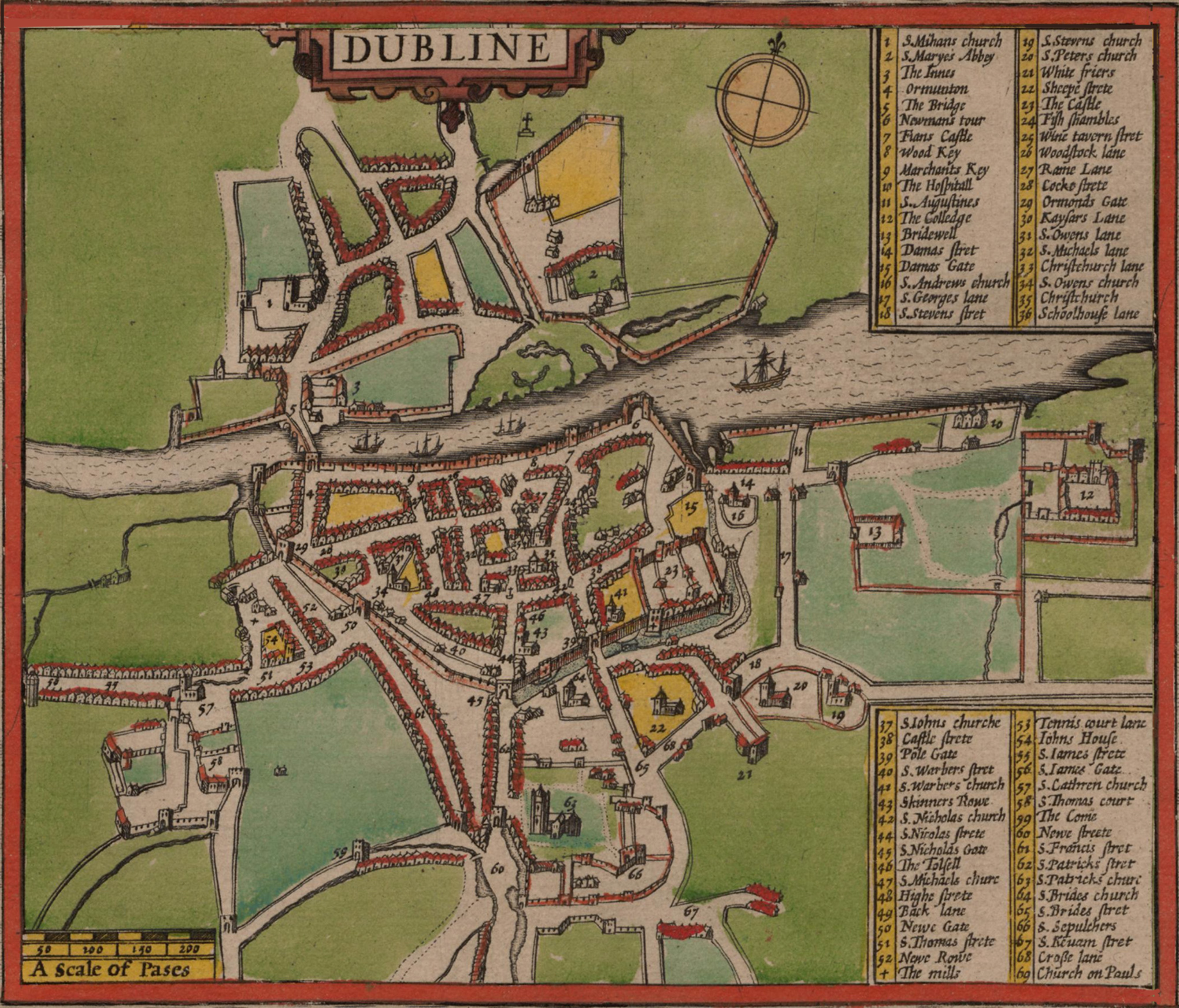
Map of Dublin 1610, showing St. Michael's Church

He was an active and reforming Archbishop, who established a new corporation in St. Patrick's Cathedral and founded chantries in St. Michael's Church, Dublin (which he converted into a parish church) and St. Audoen's Church. His rule as Archbishop was marked by a long-running conflict with John Swayne, who had become Archbishop of Armagh in 1418, two years after Talbot failed to obtain confirmation of his election to that see. Talbot revived an old dispute by denying the primacy of the see of Armagh over that of Dublin, and refused to accept the right of Swayne to call himself Primate of Ireland. Swayne was equally intransigent: in 1429 he refused to attend a session of the Irish Parliament in Leinster if his primacy was not acknowledged.

== Political career ==
Richard's elder brother John, the future 1st Earl of Shrewsbury, was Lord Lieutenant of Ireland between 1414 and 1420 and again in 1425 and in 1446–7. Richard acted as Lord Deputy of Ireland during his brother's Lieutenancy, and also as Justiciar of Ireland. In 1423 he was appointed Lord Chancellor of Ireland and held the latter office for most of the next twenty years. When he was replaced by Thomas Chase, the Chancellor of Oxford University, he simply refused to hand over the Great Seal of Ireland, and Chace was forced to return to England until Talbot was eventually persuaded, with great difficulty, to surrender the Seal.

The condition of English rule in Ireland at this time has been described as "a chronic state of imbecility, folly and corruption". Talbot was at least prepared to act firmly: in 1419 he arrested Christopher Preston, 2nd Baron Gormanston and other members of the Irish nobility on suspicion of treason, although nothing came of these charges, which probably had no basis in fact. Inevitably he made enemies: in 1426 he was deprived of the Lord Chancellorship, but he was soon restored to office. A more serious crisis arose in 1429 when he was accused of fomenting rebellion, and summoned to London to account for his actions. Clearly, the English Council was satisfied with his defence since he was not deprived of office.

== Butler–Talbot feud ==
The charges against Talbot may have been connected with the long-running feud between the Talbots and James Butler, 4th Earl of Ormonde. Shrewsbury had previously been accused of "harsh treatment" of Ormonde, and his brother intensified the quarrel, to the point where Anglo-Irish politics became increasingly split between the Talbot and Butler factions. It has been said that the feud reached the point of actual hatred on both sides. The split led Talbot to clash with at least one of the Irish bishops, Edward Dantsey, the English-born Bishop of Meath, who like many public figures had endeavoured to remain neutral, but eventually sided with Ormonde. Talbot tried unsuccessfully to veto Dantsey's appointment as Lord Deputy to his brother's replacement as Lord Lieutenant, Edmund Mortimer, 5th Earl of March. The Talbot faction was dominant in the 1430s when there was a brief lull in the feud, but in 1442 the appointment of Ormonde as Lord Lieutenant of Ireland caused the feud to break out with fresh bitterness. Talbot was sent to London to ask for an English Lord Lieutenant to replace Ormonde, and produced an extraordinary document which he claimed was a petition of the Irish Parliament against Ormonde (it is unclear if, in fact, the Parliament had authorised it).

Talbot denounced Ormonde as an old and feeble man (in fact he was fifty, some years younger than Talbot himself), who was unfit to keep order in Ireland. He was accused of having lost most of his property through his own negligence; there were vague references to treason and "crimes not fit for a bishop to speak of". The Council felt that it could not ignore the charges, and Ormonde was summoned to London to account for his actions. He defended himself with great vigour and was allowed to keep his office. He made numerous counter-charges against Talbot, including a charge of assaulting two senior members of the Government, Robert Dyke, the Master of the Rolls in Ireland, and Hugh Banent (or Bavent), Lord High Treasurer of Ireland. The English Council in the end rebuked both sides of the dispute for weakening the Irish government by "creating divisions and rumours among the King's men". The rebuke had little effect, and both men remained in office, their hostility unabated.

Relations between the Talbots and the Butlers did eventually improve, and to mark the two families' reconciliation, Ormonde's daughter Elizabeth married Shrewsbury's son and heir, the future 2nd Earl.

== Last years ==
Talbot was removed from the office of Lord Chancellor, though he acted as Justiciar of Ireland and as Lord Deputy during his brother's final term of office. He showed his usual spirit by refusing a second chance to become Archbishop of Armagh when Swayne, at last, retired in 1439.

He died in Dublin on 15 August 1449, aged about sixty, and was buried in St. Patrick's Cathedral, Dublin. His brother Lord Shrewsbury was killed at the Battle of Castillon in 1453.

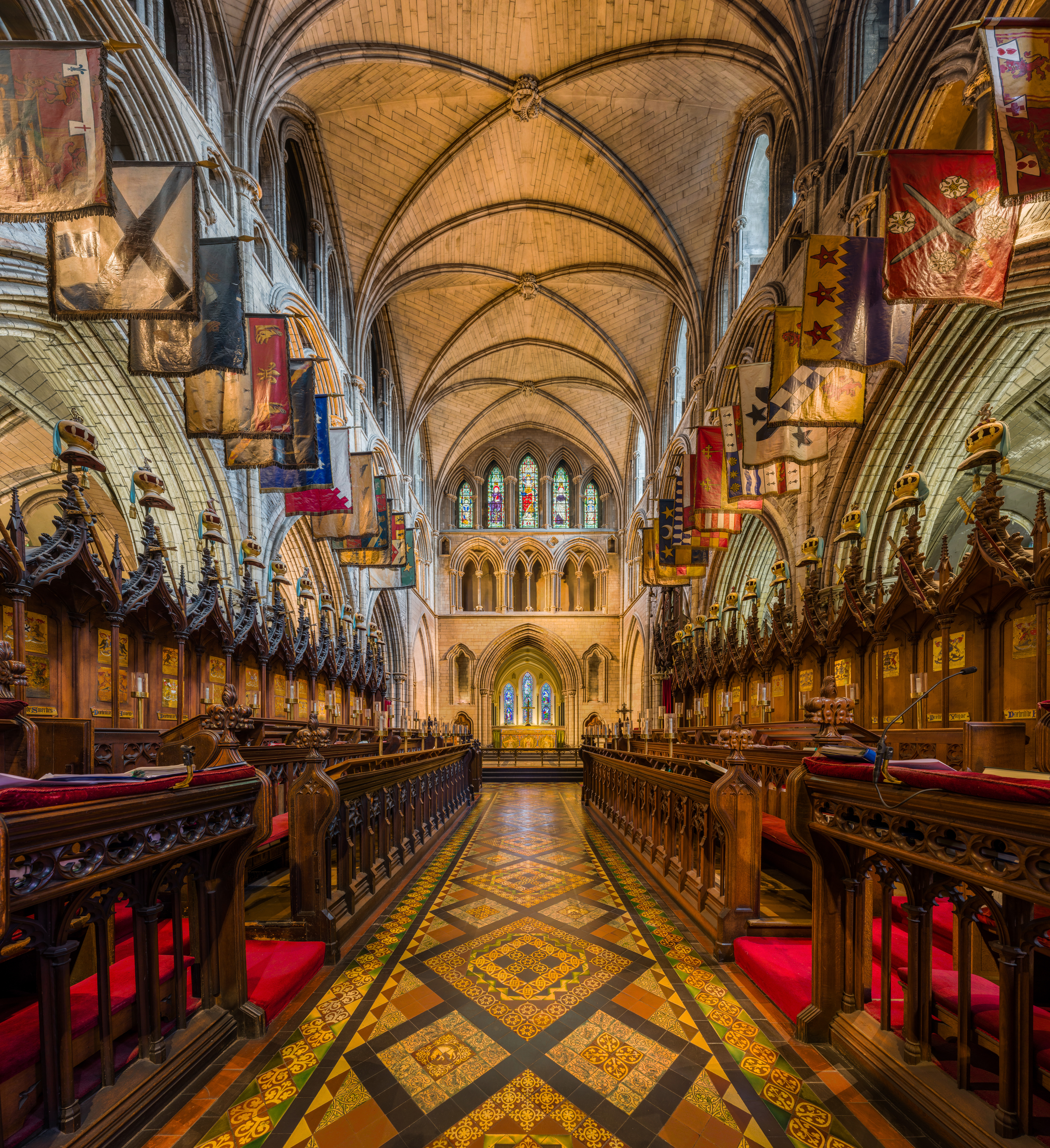
St Patrick's Cathedral

== Character ==
Richard Talbot was undoubtedly a man of great intelligence and strong character: O'Flanagan thought him a man in every way as remarkable as his brother "the great Earl of Shrewsbury". On the other hand, he had serious character flaws, being high-handed, quarrelsome and undiplomatic, His refusal to hand over the Great Seal to Thomas Chace shows him to have been arrogant and obstructive. His feud with Archbishop Swayne weakened the authority of the Church; and his quarrel with Ormonde, which seems to have been as much personal as political, is generally agreed to have been a major factor in seriously damaging English rule in Ireland.

Even in a turbulent age when cases of assault and even murder were common enough it was notable that Talbot, despite his clerical office, was prepared to use violence, as shown by the credible accusation in 1442 that he had beaten up two senior members of the Irish Privy Council, Hugh Banent and Robert Dyke.

He had a reputation for extravagance: his successor Michael Tregury, having conducted an audit, complained in 1451 that Talbot had reduced the income of the Archdiocese to below £300 a year.

Catholic Church titles
Preceded by Thomas Cranley	Archbishop of Dublin; 1417–1449	Succeeded by Michael Tregury
