= William Stamer =

William Stamer may refer to:

- Sir William Stamer, 1st Baronet (1764–1838), Irish politician
- Sir William Stamer, brigantine that ran aground on 1 April 1874
- William Donovan Stamer (1895–1963), British Army officer
