= Frederick Darley =

Frederick Darley may refer to:

- Frederick Matthew Darley (1830–1910), Australian judge
- Frederick Darley (architect) (1798–1872), Irish architect
- Frederick Darley (alderman) (1764–1841), Irish builder and Lord Mayor of Dublin
