= 1896 Dublin Corporation election =

1896 municipal election in Dublin

- 25 November 1896

15 of 60 seats on Dublin Corporation 31 seats needed for a majority

An election to 15 of the 60 seats on Dublin Corporation took place in November 1896 as part of that year's Irish local elections. One councillor was elected from each of the city's 15 wards.

== Results by ward ==
*: Incumbent councillor.

=== Arran Quay Ward ===
Arran Quay Ward Electorate: 1,063
Party	Candidate	Votes	%	±%
Ratepayers	Richard Jones	495	60.44	
Irish Nationalist	M. J. Losty	324	39.56	
Turnout				

=== Fitzwilliam Ward ===
Fitzwilliam Ward Electorate: 676
Party	Candidate	Votes	%	±%
Irish Unionist	William Ireland	242	42.16	
Anti-Parnellite	Patrick W. Corrigan	203	35.37	
Parnellite	Philip Redmond	129	22.47	
Turnout				

=== Inns Quay Ward ===
Inns Quay Ward
Party	Candidate	Votes	%	±%
Anti-Parnellite	Thomas Lenehan	Unopposed	N/A	
Turnout				

=== Mansion House Ward ===
Mansion House Ward
Party	Candidate	Votes	%	±%
Parnellite	Daniel Tallon	Unopposed	N/A	
Turnout				

=== Merchants' Quay Ward ===
Merchants' Quay Ward
Party	Candidate	Votes	%	±%
Parnellite	Gerald Shalvey	171	55.88	
Ratepayers	Albert L. Altman	135	44.12	
Turnout				

=== Mountjoy Ward ===
Mountjoy Ward Electorate:~800
Party	Candidate	Votes	%	±%
Parnellite	William Buckley	323	57.68	
Ratepayers	E. L. Richardson	237	42.32	
Turnout				

=== North City Ward ===
North City Ward
Party	Candidate	Votes	%	±%
Ratepayers	Christopher Grimes	Unopposed	N/A	
Turnout				

=== Rotunda Ward ===
Rotunda Ward
Party	Candidate	Votes	%	±%
Ratepayers	Patrick Gregan	Unopposed	N/A	
Turnout				

=== Royal Exchange Ward ===
Royal Exchange Ward Electorate: 385
Party	Candidate	Votes	%	±%
Irish Unionist	George Thompson	186	58.13	
Parnellite	Michael Murray	134	41.87	
Turnout		332		

=== South City Ward ===
South City Ward
Party	Candidate	Votes	%	±%
Irish Unionist	George Healy	Unopposed	N/A	
Turnout				

=== South Dock Ward ===
South Dock Ward
Party	Candidate	Votes	%	±%
Parnellite	John Patrick Smyth	339	66.86	
Irish Unionist	John S. Goodfellow	168	33.14	
Turnout				

=== Trinity Ward ===
Trinity Ward
Party	Candidate	Votes	%	±%
Parnellite	Philip Meagher	Unopposed	N/A	
Turnout				

=== Usher's Quay Ward ===
Usher's Quay Ward
Party	Candidate	Votes	%	±%
	William Houghton Beardwood	Unopposed	N/A	
Turnout				

=== Wood Quay Ward ===
Wood Quay Ward Electorate: 890
Party	Candidate	Votes	%	±%
Parnellite	Michael O'Reilly	443	56.36	
Ind. Unionist	John Keys	343	43.64	
Turnout				
