= St. Patrick's Industrial School, Kilkenny =

School in Ireland

St. Patrick's Industrial School (or St Patrick's Industrial School) was an industrial school a mile from Kilkenny city run by the Sisters of Charity. Boys up to the age of 10 were housed there, in some exceptional cases, until the age of 12.

It was built on land acquired by the then Bishop of Ossory, Dr. Moran, in 1879.

The school grounds housed a farm and several workshops such as carpenters and painters.

The school was closed on 25 November 1966 and the remaining boys transferred to other institutions, including St. Joseph's Industrial School in Kilkenny which had until this point only housed girls. Several abuse cases involving the boys as victims after the move into St. Joseph's were revealed to the public from the 1990s onwards.

== Buildings ==
The main school building was built in 1861 after a design by Frederick Darley. The protected (NIAH no. 12401904) limestone and brick building follows the Jacobean Revival style. The adjoining chapel is also a protected building (NIAH no. 12401918) and was built c.1875. Both dates are strangely before the purchase of the land in 1879.

Other, mostly single-story buildings were built later to accommodate the workshops, residential areas, a swimming pool, a gym, and other facilities.

== Gallery of buildings ==
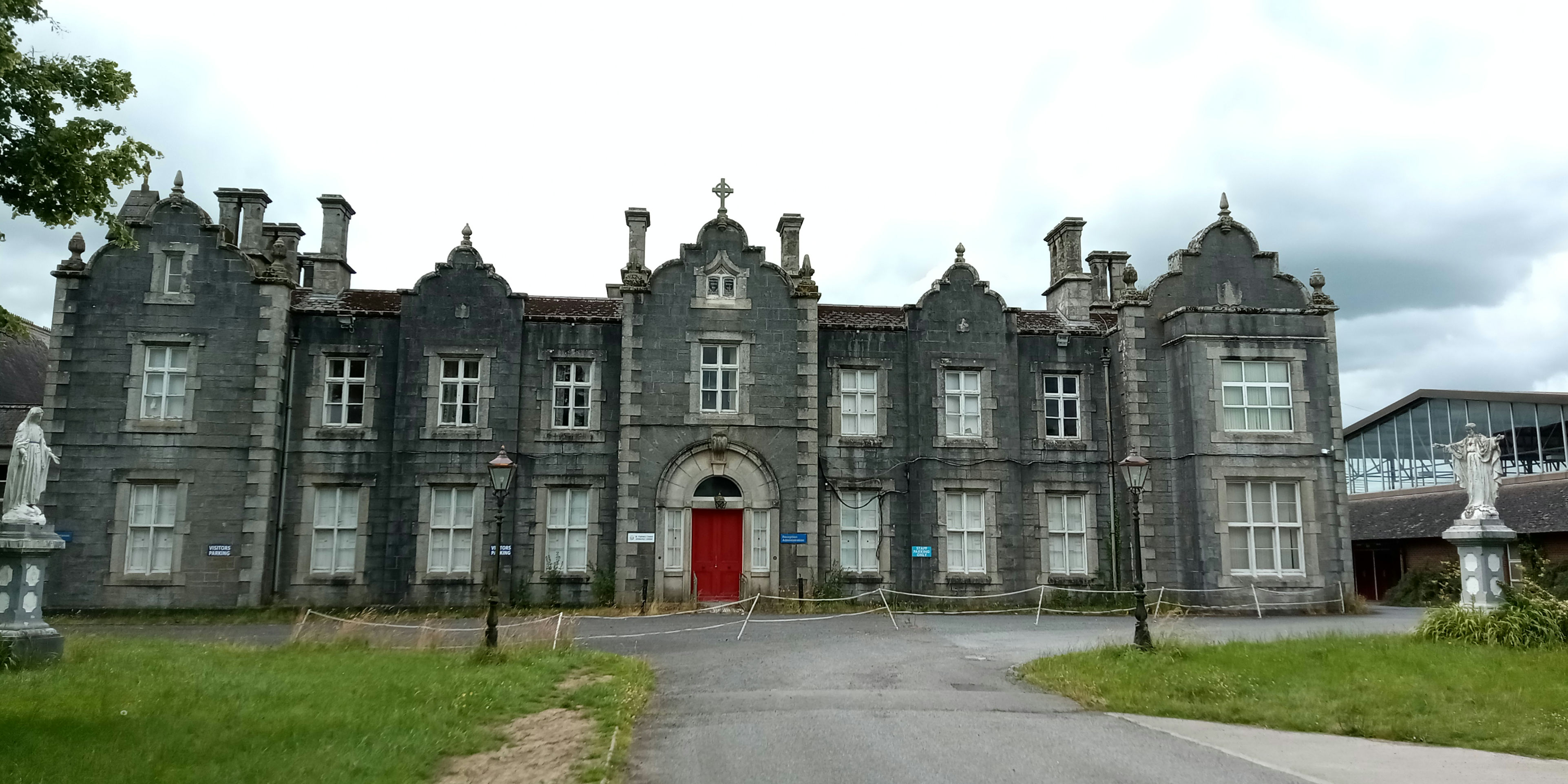
The main building

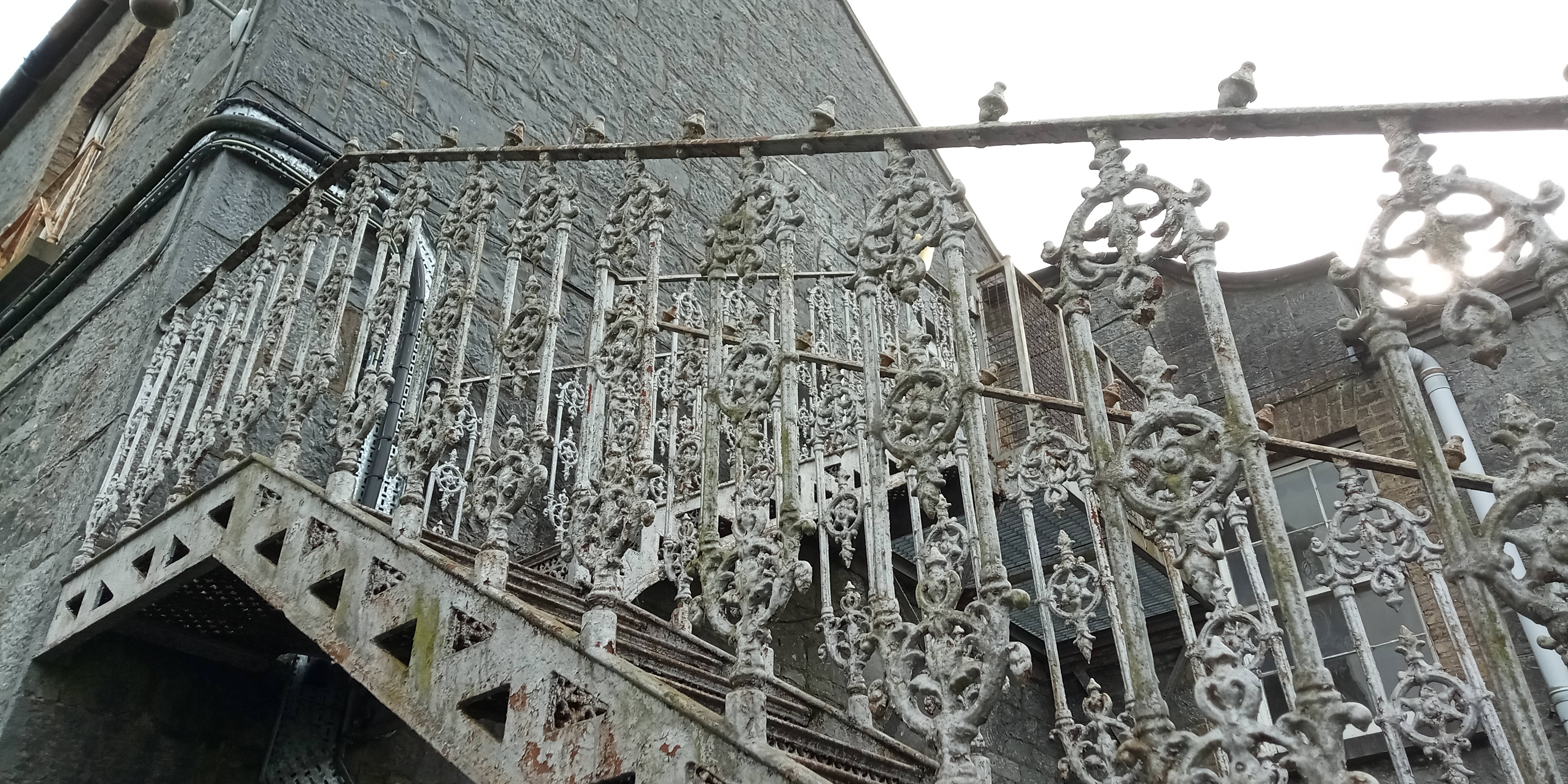
Cast iron staircase on the northeastern side of the building

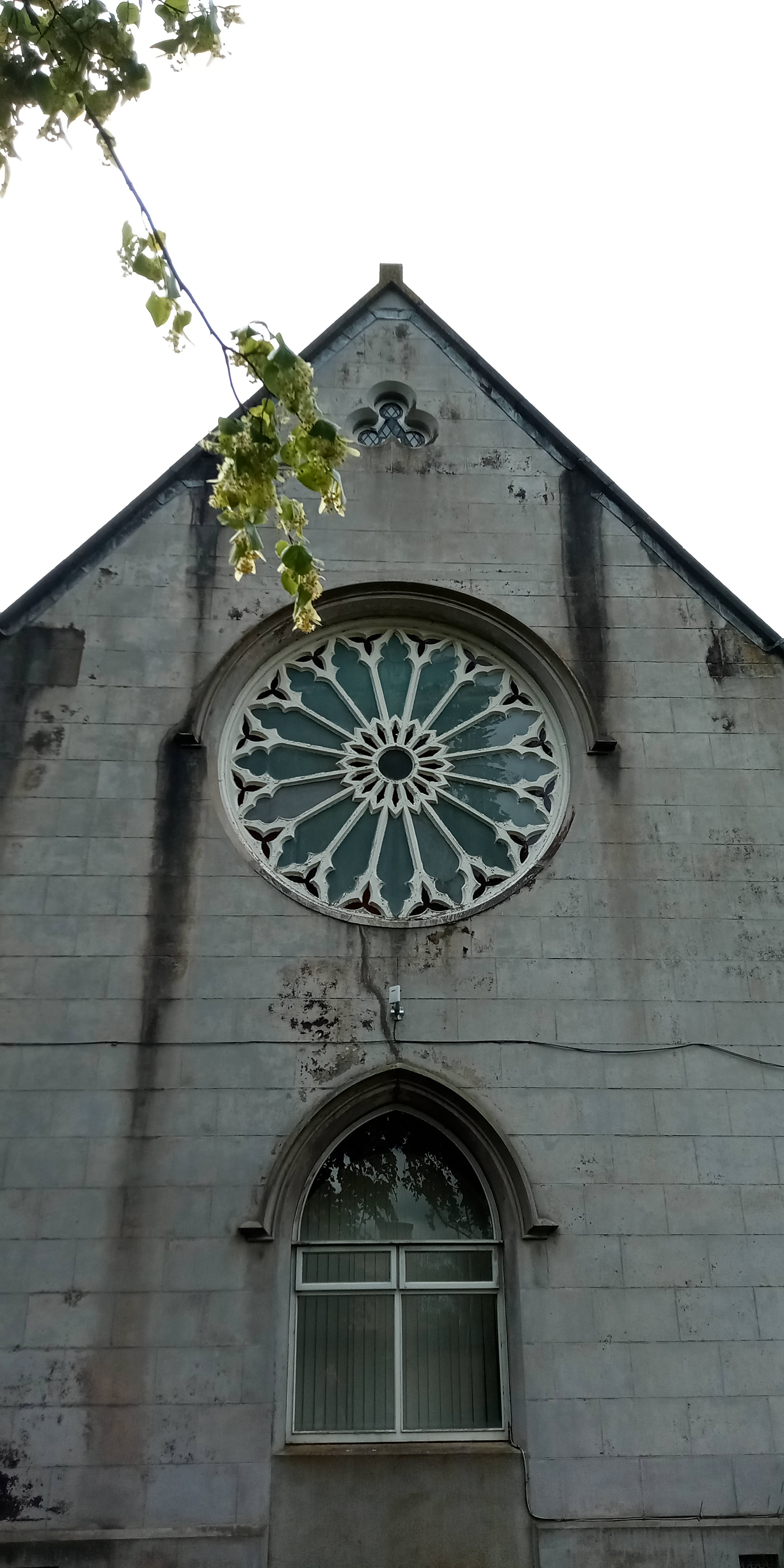
Chapel window facing Northeast

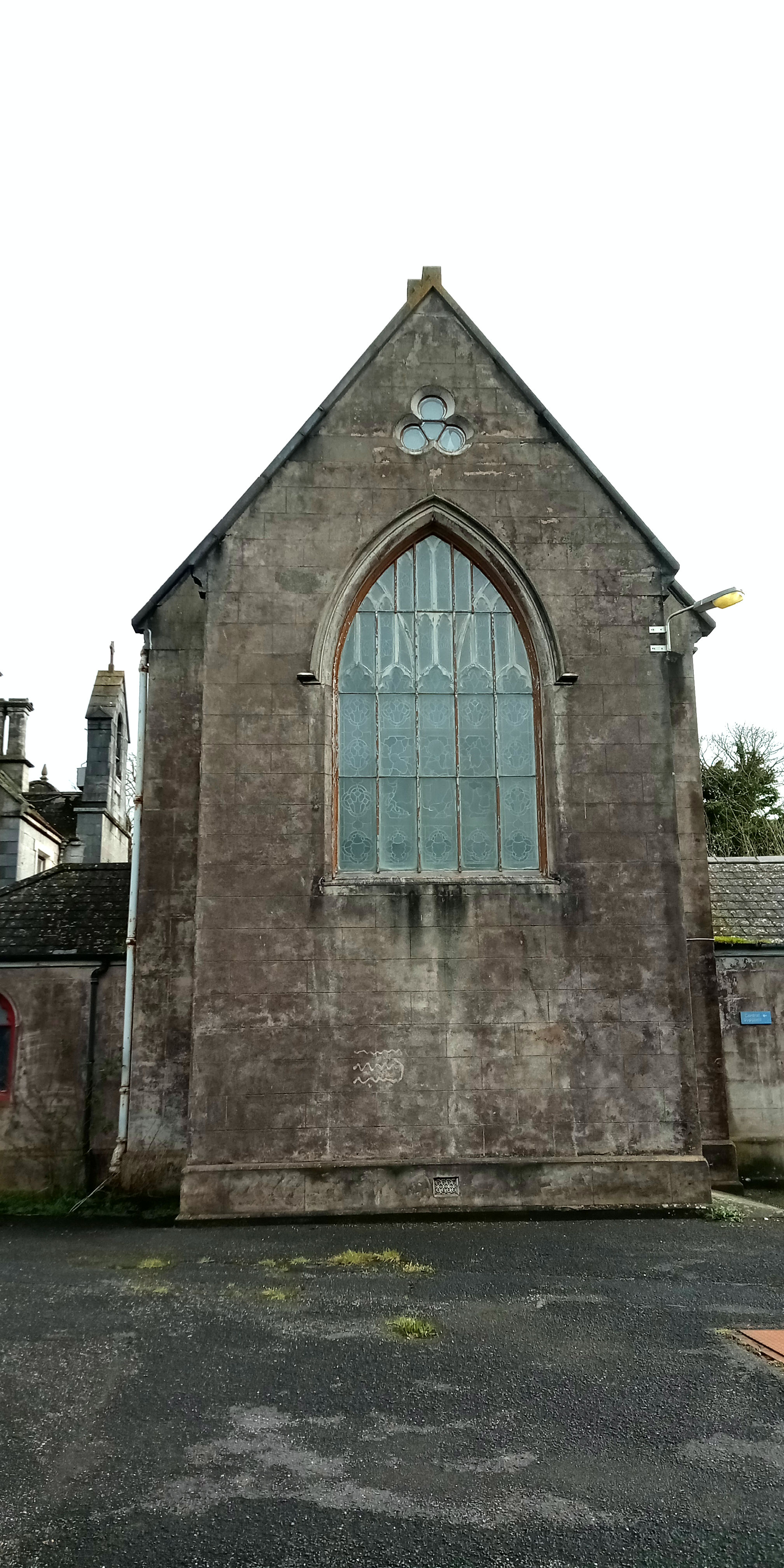
Chapel gable facing Southwest

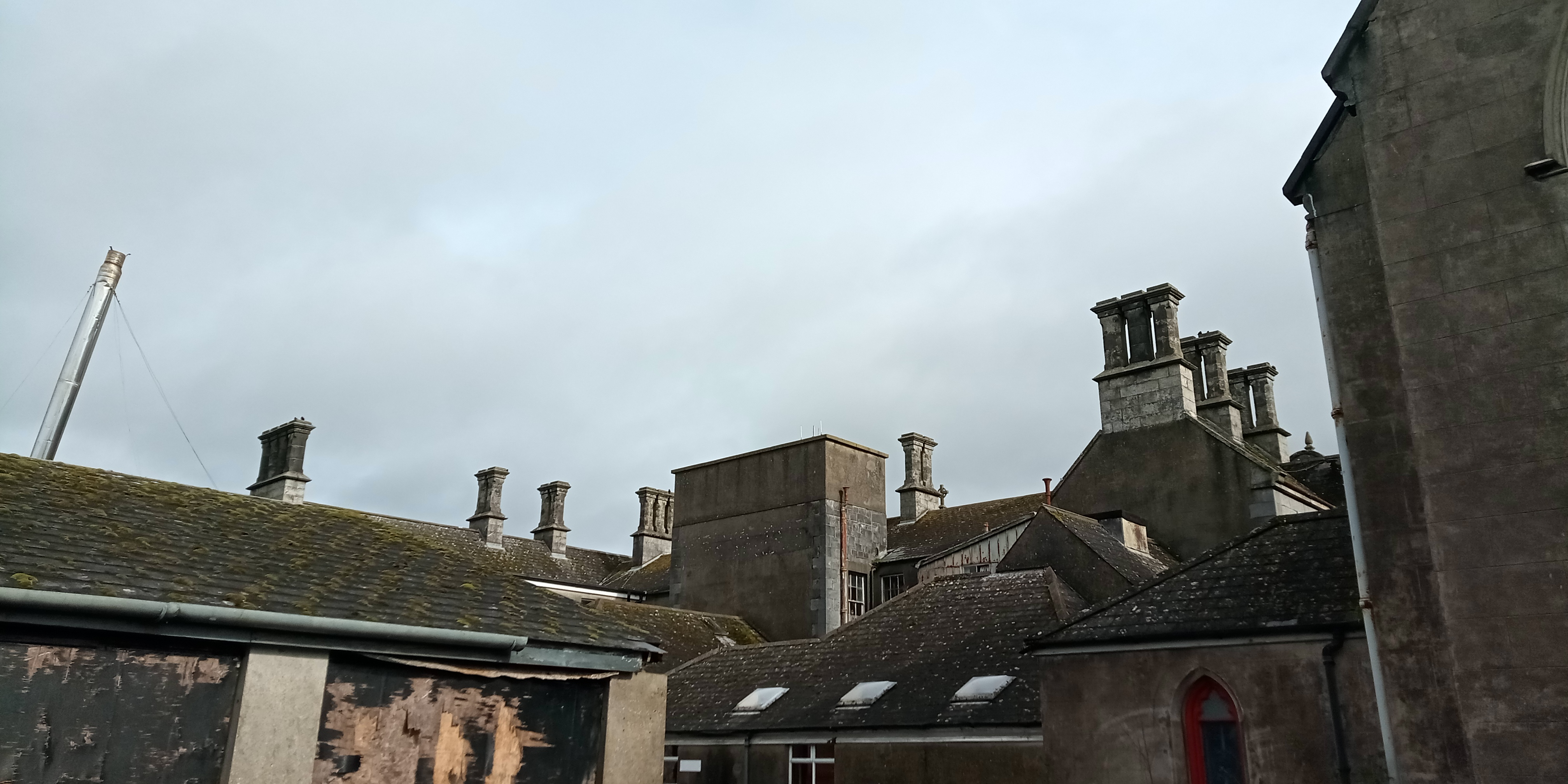
Roofscape

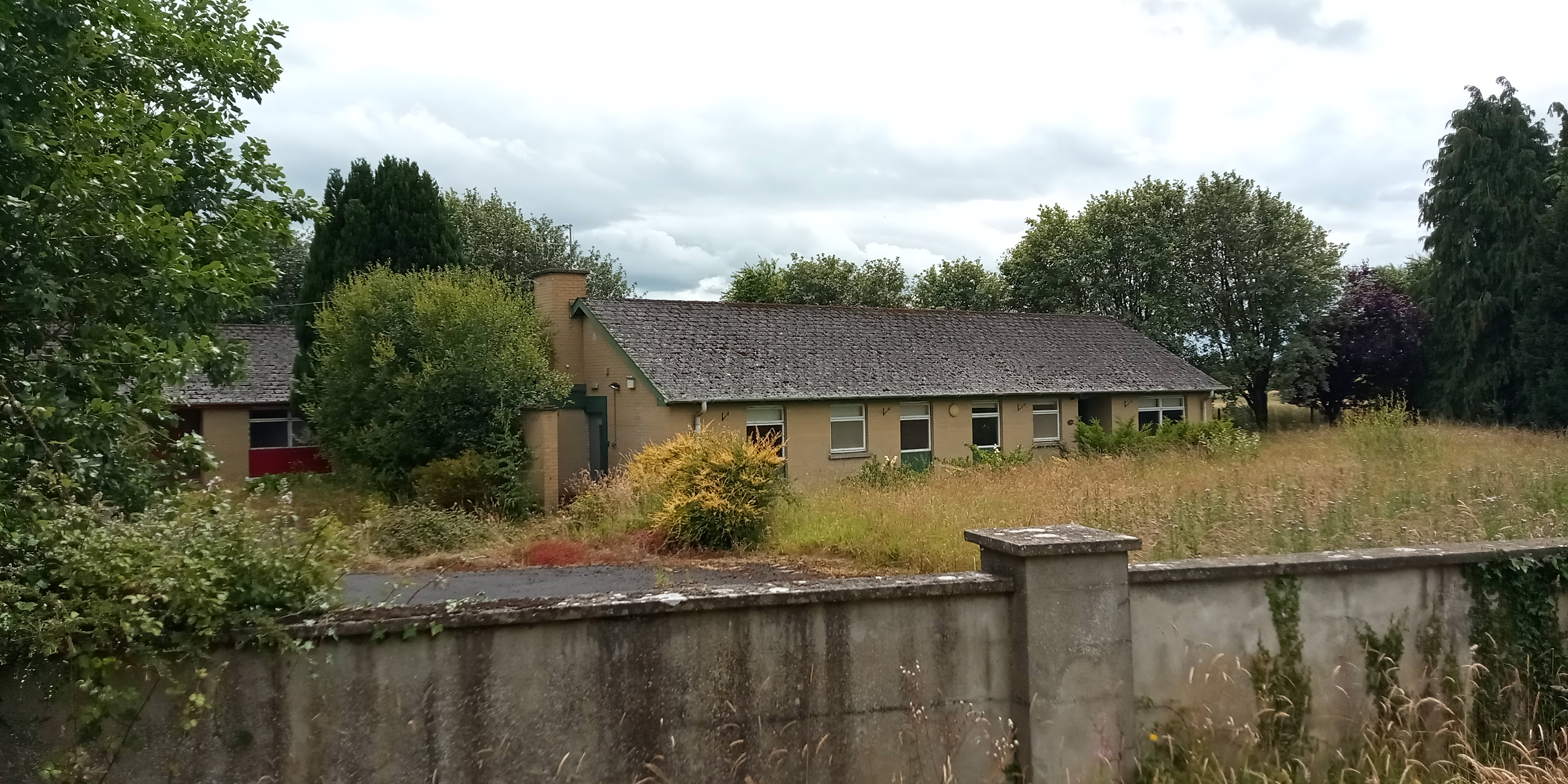
One of the one-story buildings as seen from the nuns' cemetery

== Burial grounds ==
At least 68 boys died between 1881 and 1965 and are buried in a cemetery at the periphery of the school grounds. There is also one staff member, a matron, buried with them. At the time, the boys were apparently not aware of the existence of this cemetery.

See list of names with details like age and cause of death.

In a cemetery closer to the chapel, the Sisters of Charity who were running the school are buried.

== Gallery of cemeteries ==
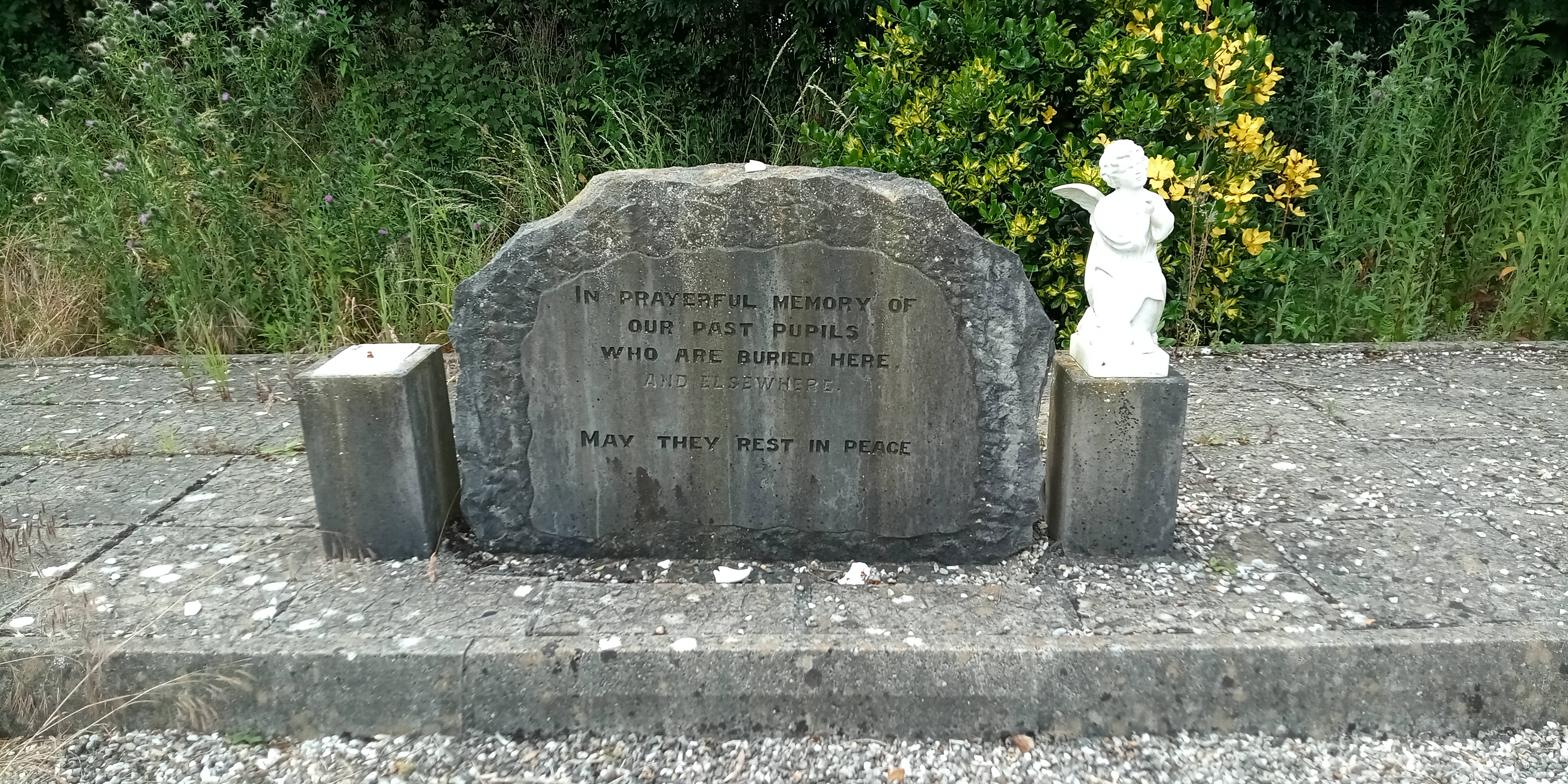
Memorial stone for former pupils of St. Patrick's School

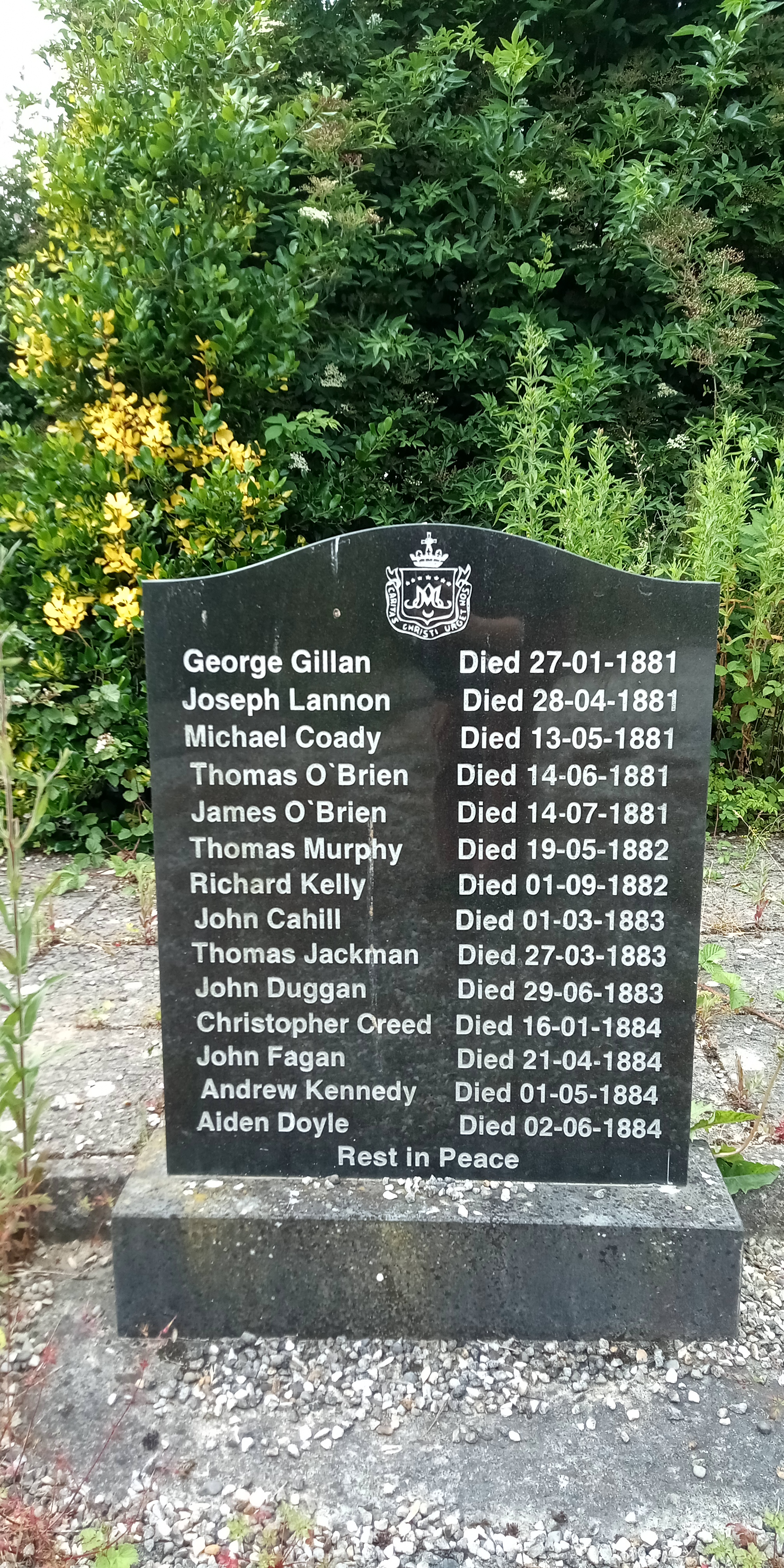
Memorial stone for the first years at St. Patrick's

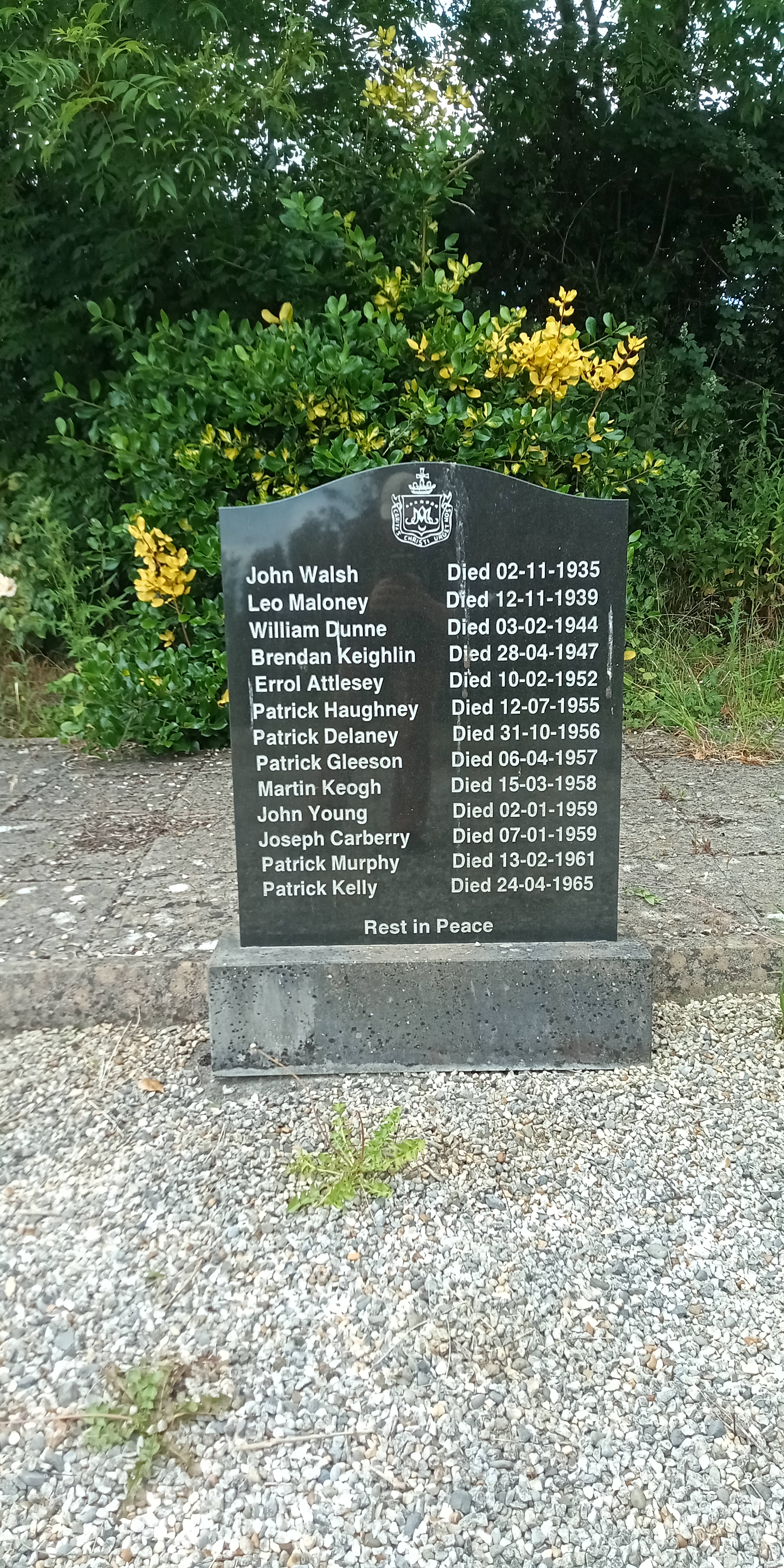
Memorial stone for the last years at St. Patrick's

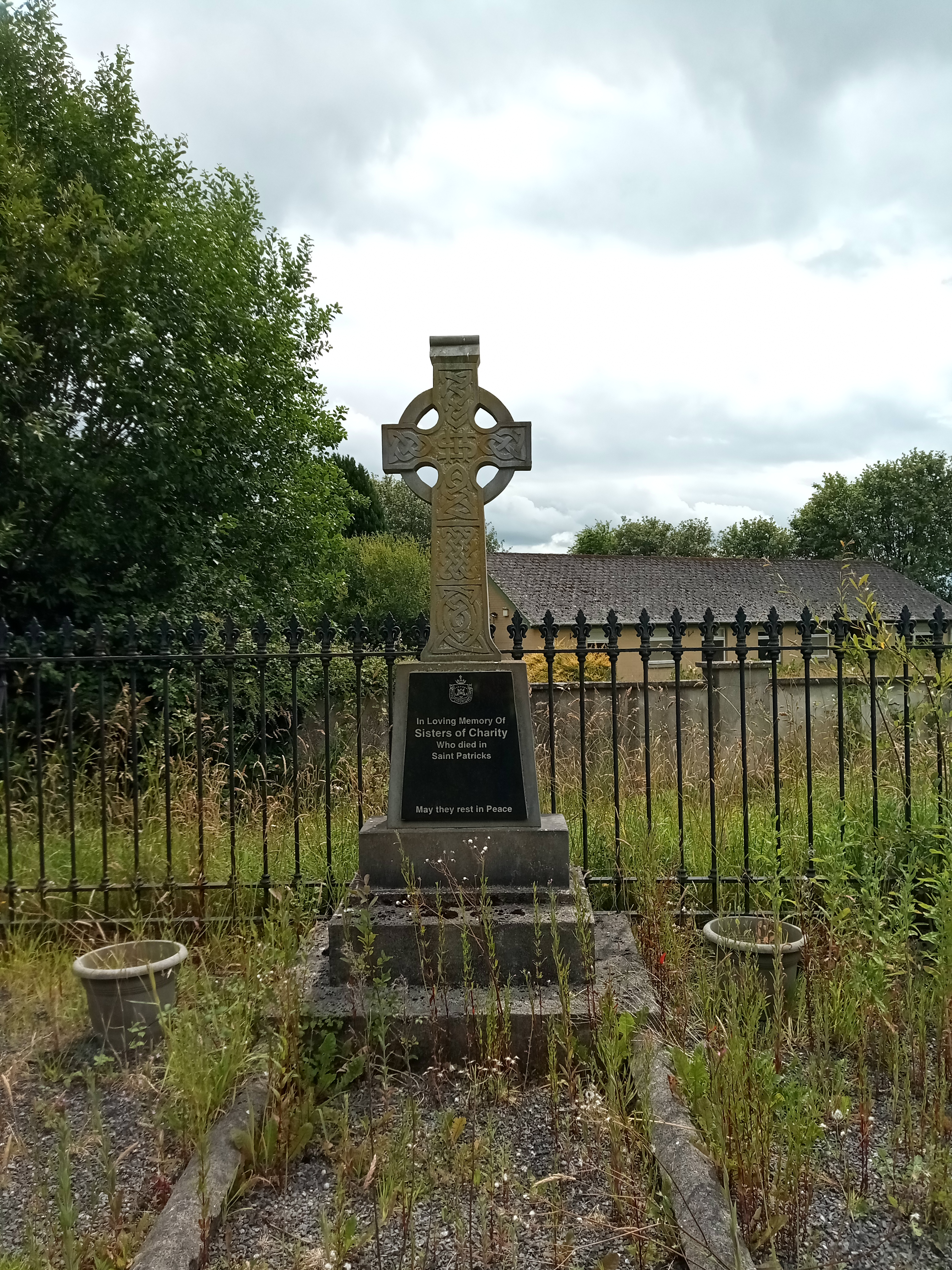
Memorial stone for the Sisters of Charity at St. Patrick's

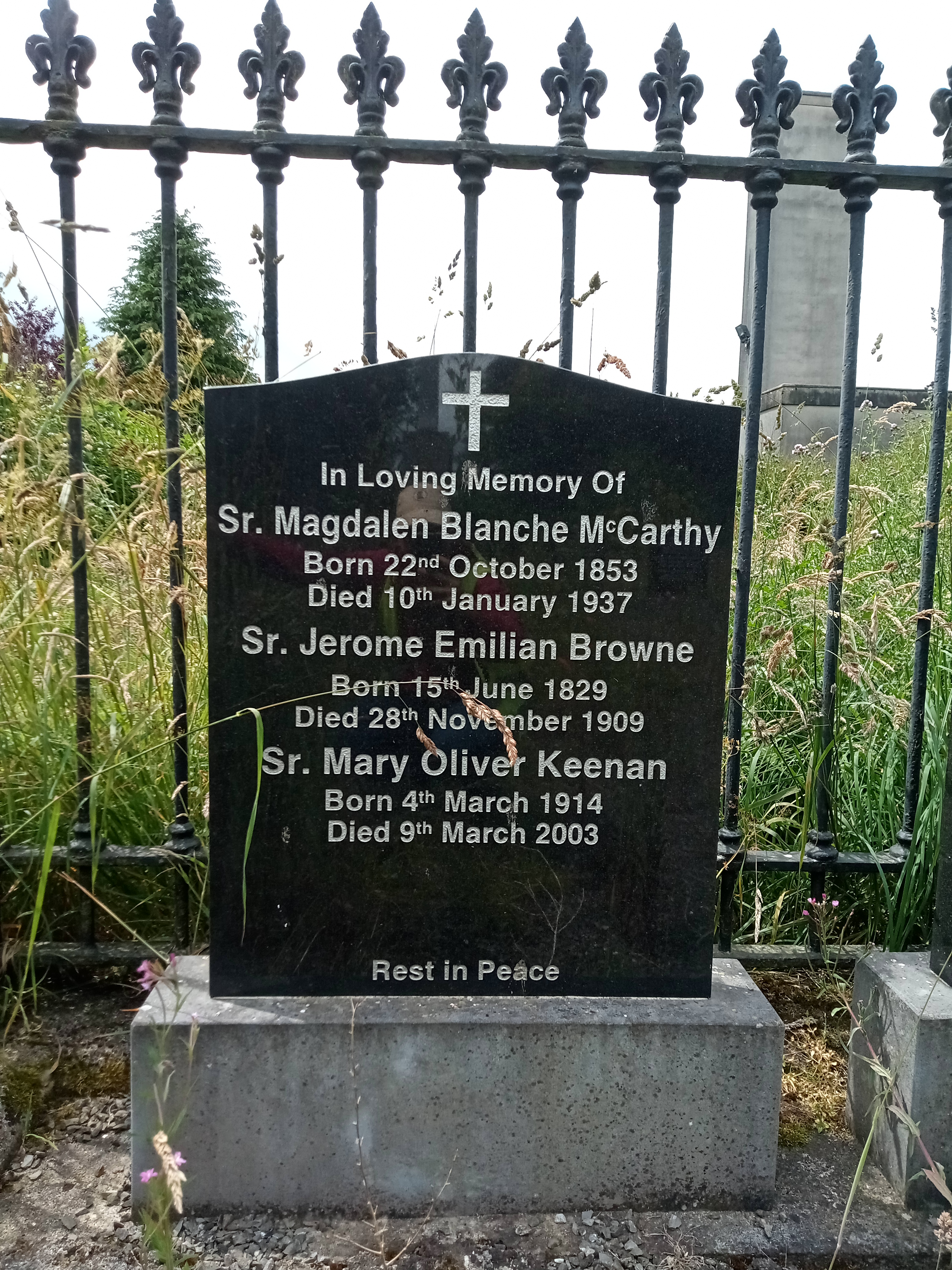
Example grave marker/ memorial stone for nuns
