= FitzGerald baronets of Newmarket on Fergus (1822) =

Extinct baronetcy in Ireland

Escutcheon of the FitzGerald baronets of Newmarket on Fergus

The FitzGerald baronetcy, of Newmarket on Fergus, or Carrigoran in County Clare, was created in the Baronetage of the United Kingdom on 5 January 1822 for Augustine FitzGerald. He was son of Edward Fitzgerald (c. 1736–1814) of Carrigoran, M.P. for Co. Clare, 1782. The family were a branch of the Geraldines of Pallas, County Limerick, established at Carrigoran, parish of Kilnasoolagh, barony of Bunratty Lower, County Clare, which they bought in 1678 from Col. Daniel O'Brien, later Viscount Clare.

The title became extinct on the death of the 5th Baronet in 1908.

== FitzGerald baronets, of Newmarket on Fergus (1822) ==
- Sir Augustine Fitzgerald, 1st Baronet (c. 1765–1834)
- Sir William Fitzgerald, 2nd Baronet (c. 1780–1847)
- Sir Edward Fitzgerald, 3rd Baronet (1806–1865)
- Sir Augustine Fitzgerald, 4th Baronet (1809–1893)
- Sir George Cumming Fitzgerald, 5th Baronet (1823–1908)

== Notes ==
Baronetage of the United Kingdom
Preceded by King baronets	FitzGerald baronets of Newmarket on Fergus; 6 November 1821	Succeeded by Brooke baronets
