= Sheriff of Dublin City =

Former judicial and administrative role in Dublin, Ireland

The Sheriff of Dublin City is a judicial and administrative role in Ireland. Initially, the Sovereign's judicial representative in Dublin, the role was later held by two individuals and concerned with a mix of judicial, political and administrative functions. In origins, an office for a lifetime, assigned by the Sovereign, the Sheriff became an annual appointment following the Provisions of Oxford in 1258.

Today, the Sheriff is a full-time public official whose role includes enforcing court orders of the Circuit Court, such as eviction or debt collection, acting as returning officer in public elections, and executing tax certificates on behalf of the Revenue Commissioners.

== Background ==
The first Shrievalties were established before the Norman Conquest in 1066 and date back to Saxon times. Besides his judicial importance, the sheriff had ceremonial and administrative functions and executed High Court Writs. In 1908, an Order in Council made the Lord-Lieutenant the Sovereign's prime representative in a county and reduced the Sheriff's precedence. Despite this, the office retained responsibilities for the preservation of law and order in a county.

== Position ==
Sheriffs (two for each year) were first appointed in Dublin in 1308 under the name of bailiffs; the title was changed to sheriff in 1548.

The sheriffs presided at meetings of the Common Council (the "commons" or lower house of the City Assembly of Dublin), and after their year in office took their place among up to 48 Sheriffs Peers, who sat alongside 96 Guild representatives as the Common Council. The trade guilds also elected the Sheriffs and Commons members.

24 aldermen sat on the City Assembly as part of the Upper House alongside the Lord Mayor of Dublin and exercised supreme authority.

The City Assembly gave its name to the still extant City Assembly House.

The High Sheriff was ex officio a member of the "Port of Dublin Corporation" from 1786 until 1867, when the body was split into the Commissioners of Irish Lights and the Dublin Port and Docks Board, neither of which had him as member.

== List of Sheriffs of Dublin City ==
=== 13th century ===
- 1280: Robert le Decer

=== 14th century ===
- 1308: William le Deveneys
- 1332: John Callan, William le Walsh
- 1377: William Fitzwilliam
- 1379: Walter Passavant; William Bank'

=== 15th century ===
- 1405: Geoffrey Parker
- 1406: Thomas Shorthalls, later a Baron of the Court of Exchequer, first term
- 1414: Thomas Shorthalls, second term
- 1424: Thomas Shorthalls, third term
- 1442/3: William de la Field
- 1489: Patrick Mole; Thomas Bermingham

=== 16th century ===
- 1524: John Ussher
- 1547: John Ryan; Thomas Fleming
- 1548: Edward Brown; Robert Golding
- 1549: Christopher Seagrave;John Nangell
- 1550: Patrick Fitz-Simons;Thomas Fitz-Simons
- 1551: Richard Burnwell; William Handcock
- 1552: Walter England; Edward Drake
- 1553: Walter Rochford;Robert Usher
- 1554: William Sarsfield; Robert Janes
- 1555: Patrick Buckley; Patrick Giggen
- 1556: John Usher; Edward Peppard
- 1557: John Dempsey; Walter Cusack
- 1558: Michael Fitz-Simons; Nicholas Fitz-Simons
- 1559: Richard Galtrem; Edward Burran
- 1560: Patrick Gough; James Bellew
- 1561: Henry Browne; Michael Tyrrell
- 1562: Edward Barron; Walter Clinton
- 1563: John Fitz-Simons; John Luttrell
- 1564: James Dartas; Patrick Dowdall
- 1565: Christopher Fagan; John White
- 1566: John Gaydon; John Gough
- 1567: Giles Allen; John Luttrell
- 1568: Nicholas Duffe; Richard Rouncell
- 1569: William Fitz-Simons; John Lenan
- 1570: Nicholas Ball;Simon Grave
- 1571: Andrew Tyrell; Thomas Doyne
- 1572: Walter Ball; Thomas Cosgrave
- 1573: John Quin; Patrick Brown
- 1574: Henry Cusack; Thomas Cane
- 1575: Richard Fagan; William Barnwell 9
- 1576: Edward White; Edward Devenish
- 1577: Walter Segrave; James Barry
- 1578: John Forster; William Picket
- 1579: Henry Shelton; Thomas Smith
- 1580: John Durmings; James Matton
- 1581: John Malone; Philip Conran
- 1582: Robert Stephans; Edward Thomas
- 1583: John Borran; William Brown
- 1584: John Dongan; Lawrence White
- 1585: Thomas Garrot; James Ryan
- 1586: Francis Taylor;Edmond Conran
- 1587: Nicholas Weston; Michael Chamberling
- 1588: John Tyrrell; James Bellew
- 1589: Matthew Handcock; Thomas Browne
- 1590: Walter Galtrim: Nicholas Burrane
- 1591: George Kennedy; John Mills
- 1592: John Usher; Thomas Flemming
- 1593: Richard Ashe; John Moophem
- 1594: William Gough; Ralph Sancky
- 1595: John Elliott; John Marshall
- 1596: John Shelton; Alexander Pallice
- 1597: Robert Pantine; John Gooding
- 1598: John Brice; Edward Purcell
- 1599: John Cusacke; John Arthur

=== 17th century ===
- 1600: Robert Ball; Thomas Bishop
- 1601: Robert Kennedy; William Turner
- 1602: Richard Stephans; Peter Dermott
- 1603: James Tyrell; Thomas Carroll
- 1604: Edward Malone; Richard Barry
- 1605: John Bennes; Richard Browne, 1st Baronet
- 1606: John Lany; Nicholas Purcell
- 1607: Thomas Dromgowle; James Bee
- 1608: Thomas Allen; Robert Eustace
- 1609: Thomas Long; William Preston
- 1610: Edward Ball; Richard Eustace
- 1611: William Chalkerett; Richard Wiggett
- 1612: Edward Cullen; John Franton
- 1613: Thadey Duffe; Auntient Taylor
- 1614: John Goodwin; Patrick Fox
- 1615: Simon Banewell; Nicholas Springham
- 1616: Nicholas Kelly; Daniel Burn
- 1617: William Bishop; Robert Linigar
- 1618: Thomas Russell; Henry Cheshire
- 1619: John Lock; Richard Teyster
- 1620: Edward Janes; William Allen
- 1621: Christopher Forster; Christopher Handcock
- 1622: Thomas White; Thomas Evans
- 1623: Christopher Wolverston; George Johns
- 1624: Sir Walter Dungan; William Weston
- 1625: Adam Gordman; Nicholas Salgrave
- 1626: Robert Arthur; Francis Dowde
- 1627: Michael Brown; Thomas Shelton
- 1628: James Bellew; William Bagott
- 1629: Charles Forster; James Watson
- 1630: Sankey Syliard; John Flemming
- 1631: Walter Tyrell; John Stanly
- 1632: David Bigg: Walter Kennedy
- 1633: Thomas Wakefield; Christopher Brice; William Purcel
- 1634: Edward Brangan; John Gibson
- 1635: John Carbery; Thomas Ormsbey
- 1636: Thomas Arthur; William Smith
- 1637: Philip Watson; William Bladon
- 1638: Sir Robert Forth; Andrew Clark
- 1639: Edward Lake; Richard Bamewell
- 1640: John Bamber; Abraham Rickes
- 1641: Laurence Allen; John Woodcock
- 1642: John Pue; Thomas Pemberton
- 1643: John Miller; Peter Fletcher
- 1644: John Brice; Morice Pue
- 1645: Edward Hughes; John Collins
- 1646: Robert Caddell; Robert Deey
- 1647: Walter Springham; Thomas Hill
- 1648: Ralph Vanden Hoven; Robert Mills
- 1649: Thomas Waterhouse; Richard Tigh
- 1650: George Gilbert; Richard Cook
- 1651: Richard Hatfield; John Brown
- 1652: John Cranwell; William Clift
- 1653: Thomas Clark; Tobias Cramer
- 1654: William Cox; John Desmancer
- 1655: Daniel Bellingham; Richard Palfrey
- 1656: Rice Phillips; __ Bollard
- 1657: John Forrest; John Totty
- 1658: Robert Arrundell; John Eastwood
- 1659: John Price; Hugh Price
- 1660: Peter Warde; Thomas Johns
- 1661: William Whitebett; George Hewlet
- 1662: Christopher Benner; Elias Bell
- 1663: Thomas Kerkam; William Brookes
- 1664: Joshua Allen; Francis Brewster
- 1665: Christopher Lovett; John Quelch
- 1666: Philip Castleton; Joseph Dobson
- 1667: Matthew French; Giles Meey
- 1668: William Gressingham; John Linigar
- 1669: William Story; Richard Ward
- 1670: Richard Hanaway; Isaac Johns
- 1671: Henry Reynalds; Nathaniel Philpot
- 1672: Thomas Clinton; John Castleton
- 1673: Abel Ram; George Blackall
- 1674: Humphrey Jervis; William Sands
- 1675: John Knox; Walter Motley
- 1676: William Watts; Benjamin Leadbether
- 1677: James Cottingham; William Billington
- 1678: William Cook; Thomas Tennant
- 1679: Thomas Taylor; Robert Bridges
- 1680: John Coyn; Samuel Walton
- 1681: John Fletcher; Edward Haines
- 1682: William Watts; Edward Haines
- 1683: George Kenedy; Michael Mitchell
- 1684: Charles Thompson; Thomas Quine
- 1685: Richard French; Edward Ross
- 1686: James Howison; Isaac Holroyd
- 1687: Thomas Kieran; Edmond Kelly
- 1688: Christopher Palles; John Coyne; William Gibbons
- 1689: Ignatius Brown; John More (part year)
- 1689: Anthony Piercey; Mark Rainsford
- 1690: Mark Rainsford; Edward Lloyd
- 1691: Thomas Bell; Henry Stephens
- 1692: Francis Stoyte; William Gibbons
- 1693: John Page; Robert Twigg
- 1694: Benjamin Burton; Thomas Denham
- 1695: Andrew Brice; William Stowell
- 1696: Robert Constantine; Robert Whitwell
- 1697: William Founds; John Pearson
- 1698: Robert Mason; Samuel Cook
- 1699: Charles Forest; James Barlow

=== 18th century ===
- 1700: John Eccles; Ralph Gore
- 1701: John Stoyte; Thomas Bolton
- 1702: Thomas Pleasants; David Cossart
- 1703: John Hendrick; William French
- 1704: Thomas Wilkinson; Thomas Cheatham
- 1706: John Godley; William Quail
- 1707: M .Pearson; H. Hendrick; W. Dixon
- 1708: Thomas Kirkwood; Thomas Curtis
- 1709: Joshua Kane; Nathaniel Shaw
- 1710: Michael Sampson; William Dobson
- 1711: Humphry French; Richard Blair
- 1712: Thomas Bradshaw: Edward Surdeville
- 1713: Thomas Bradshaw
- 1714: Peter Verdoen; William Aldrich
- 1715: John Porter; John Tisdall
- 1716: William Empsom; David King
- 1717: John Reyson; Vincent Kidder
- 1718: Percival Hunt of Larah; Charles Hendrick
- 1719: William Milton; Daniel Falkiner
- 1720: James Somerville; Nathaniel Kane
- 1721: Nathaniel Pearson; Joseph Nuttall
- 1722: John Macarrell; Robert Nesbitt
- 1723: Gilbert King; Henry Borrowes
- 1724: Ralph Blundell; George Curtis
- 1725: William Walker: Casp. White
- 1726: Philip Pearson; Thomas How
- 1727: Henry Daniell; Richard Grattan
- 1728: John Holliday; Benjamin Archer
- 1729: David Tew; John Sterne
- 1730: Samuel Cooke; Eliphal Dobson
- 1731: George Tucker; Edward Dudgeon
- 1732: David Cooke; Henry Hart
- 1733: William Woodworth; Sir Charles Burton, 1st Baronet
- 1734: John Walker; Thomas Cooke
- 1735: Robert King; John Twigg
- 1736: Richard White; Edward Hunt
- 1737: Charles Rossell; Robert Ross
- 1738: Thomas Baker; George Ribton, later Sir George Ribton, 1st Baronet of the Grove, Stillorgan
- 1739 John Bernard Hoffshieger; John Adamson
- 1740: James Dunn; Benjamin Hunt of Dublin
- 1741: William Grattan; Sir Quaile Somerville, 2nd Baronet; T.Read
- 1742: George Fraser; John Bradshaw
- 1743: George Swettenham; Thomas Broughton
- 1744: Daniel Walker; Patrick Ewing
- 1745: John Espinase; Andrew Murray
- 1746: William Cooke; Thomas Taylor
- 1747: John Hornby; John Cooke
- 1748: Matthew Weld; Hans Bailie
- 1749: Thomas Mead; Robert Donovan
- 1750: George Reynolds; Thomas White
- 1751: James Taylor; John Tew
- 1752: John Forbes; Patrick Hamilton
- 1753: Edmond Huband; H. Wray
- 1754: Philip Crampton; Timothy Allen
- 1755: Arthur Lamprey; Charles Russell
- 1756: Peter Barré and Charles Nobileau
- 1757: Michael Sweeney; William Forbes
- 1758: Benjamin Geale; James Taylor
- 1759: Benjamin Barton; Edward Sankey
- 1760: Francis Featherston; George Wrightson
- 1761: Mathew Bailie; Thomas Blackall
- 1762: John Read; Joseph Hall
- 1763: William Brien; Francis Booker
- 1764: Henry Hart; Robert Montgomery
- 1765: William Rutledge; Richard French
- 1766: William Lightburne; Thomas Emerson
- 1767: P. Boyde; H. Bevan
- 1768: William Dunn; Henry Williams
- 1769: Kilner Sweetman; (Sir) Anthony King
- 1770: Blen. Grove; Ant. Porrier
- 1771: James Hamilton; James Horan
- 1772: James Shiels; James Jones
- 1773: Nathaniel Warren; John Tucker
- 1774: John Wilson; Thomas Truelock
- 1775: Fielding Ould; George Alcock; Thomas __?
- 1776: John Rose; William Alexander
- 1777: Henry Howison; Henry Gore Sankey
- 1778: William Worthington; Richard Moncrieff
- 1779: William James; John Exshaw
- 1780: Patrick Bride, (Governor of Bank of Ireland 1805-07), of Stephen's Green; Thomas Andrews
- 1781: James Campbell; David Dick
- 1783: Alexander Kirkpatrick; Benjamin Smith
- 1784: Caleb Jenkin; Ambrose Leet
- 1785: John Sankey; Hugh Trevor
- 1786: William Thompson; Thomas Fleming
- 1787: William Humfrey; Brent. Neville
- 1788: Thomas Tweedy; Jeremiah D'Olier
- 1789: Charles Thorpe; James Vance
- 1790: Joseph Dickenson; James Williams
- 1791: Benjamin Gault; John Norton
- 1792: Henry Hutton; Jacob Poole
- 1793: Meredith Jenkin; John Giffard
- 1794: Robert Powell; Richard Manders
- 1795: William Stamer; Humphry Minchin
- 1796: William Lindsay; Joseph Pemberton
- 1797: John Pasley; William Henry Archer
- 1798: Frederick Darley; Nathaniel Hone
- 1799: Thomas Kinsley; John Cash

=== 19th century ===
- 1800: Francis Fox; John Ferns
- 1801: Abraham Bradley King; Nathaniel Craven
- 1802: Drury Jones; George Walsh
- 1803: Joshua Pounder; Mount. John Hay
- 1804: Mark Bloxham; George Thorpe
- 1805: James Blacker; John Tudor
- 1806: Isaac Manders; Edward Nugent
- 1807: Alexander Montgomery; John Alley
- 1808: George Sutton; John George
- 1809: Sir Edward Stanley, Kt; Sir James Riddall, Kt
- 1810: Matthew West of Ederney; Brent Neville
- 1811: Robert Harty; John Kingston James
- 1812: George Studdart; Lewis Morgan
- 1813: George Warner; Jacob West
- 1814: William Smith; John Smith Fleming
- 1815: Samuel Wilkinson Tyndall; Charles Palmer Archer
- 1816: William Dixon; John Read
- 1817: George Wheeler; William Long
- 1818: Robert White; William Wood
- 1819: Sir Garrett Neville; George Newcombe
- 1820: George Whiteford; Nicholas William Brady
- 1821: Sir William Smyth
- 1822: Charles Thorp
- 1823: Samuel Lamprey
- 1824: Samuel Warren
- 1825: James Moore
- 1826: Sir Thomas Charles Yeates
- 1827: Sir David Charles Roose
- 1828: Ponsonby Shaw
- 1829: George Hoyte
- 1830: John Mallet
- 1831: John Semple, junior
- 1832: Sir George Preston
- 1833: Sir Drury Jones Dickinson
- 1834: John Elliott Hyndman
- 1835: John Drummond
- 1836: John Veevers
- 1837: John Jones
- 1838: George Browne Grant
- 1839: Francis Falkner
- 1840: Joshua H. Porter
- 1841: Sir Edward Richard Borough, Bt of Coolock Park
- 1843: David Charles Latouche
- 1844: John Benjamin Ball
- 1845: Thomas Crosthwaite
- 1846: Alexander Boyle
- 1847: George Roe
- 1848: Harold Sneyd French of Mountjoy Square
- 1849: William Digges LaTouch, of Stephen's Green
- 1850: John M'Donnell, of Merrion Square, Dublin.
- 1851: Robert Henry Kinahan
- 1852: Thomas Wilson
- 1853: Valentine O'Brien O'Connor
- 1854: William Long
- 1855: John Barlow
- 1856: James West
- 1857: Hon. George Hancock
- 1858: Samuel Law of Kilbarrack House, Raheny
- 1859: Sir James Power
- 1860: Francis R. Brooke
- 1861: James Chaigneau Colville
- 1862: William John French
- 1863: William Dargan
- 1864: Edmund D'Olier
- 1865: Joseph Boyce
- 1866: Richard Martin
- 1867: Richard Manders
- 1868: Sir Edward Hudson-Kinahan
- 1869: John Jameson
- 1870: James Stirling
- 1871: Alexander Parker
- 1872: Matthew Peter D'Arcy
- 1873: George Kinahan
- 1874: James Martin
- 1875: Robert Warren of Ballydonarea
- 1876: Edward Cecil Guinness
- 1877: John Campbell
- 1878: John Prendergast Vereker
- 1879: Hugh Tarpey
- 1880: Sir James Mackey
- 1881: Sir George Owens
- 1882: Edmund Dwyer Gray (imprisoned)
- 1883: Richard Bolger
- 1884: Andrew T. Moore
- 1885: Edward Joseph Kennedy
- 1886: Peter McDonald
- 1887: Thomas Sexton
- 1888: James Winstanley
- 1889: Joseph Meade
- 1890: George Perry
- 1891: James Shanks
- 1892: Henry Joseph Gill
- 1893: William J. Doherty of St. Mura's, Fahan
- 1894: Richard F. McCoy
- 1895: Daniel Tallon
- 1896: Joseph Hutchinson
- 1897: Robert O'Reilly
- 1898: Sir Thomas Pile
- 1899: Thomas Lenehan

=== 20th century ===
- 1900: Sir Joseph Downes
- 1901: William F. Cotton
- 1902: Patrick J. MacCabe
- 1903: William Fanagan
- 1904: William Coffey
- 1905: Gerald O'Reilly
- 1906: Anthony Madden
- 1907: Thomas Dunne
- 1908: Edward P. Monk
- 1909: Michael Doyle
- 1910: Robert Bradley
- 1911: John Cogan
- 1912: James J. Kelly
- 1913: John Scully
- 1914: Charles A. James
- 1915: Sir Patrick Shortall
- 1916: Thomas O'Brien/William P. Delany
- 1917: Myles Keogh
- 1918: Rt. Hon. Sir Andrew Beattie
- 1919: John P. MacAvin
- 1920: James C. McWalter
- 1921: J. Hubbard Clark
- 1922: J. Hubbard Clark

== See also ==
- Lord Mayor of Dublin
- List of mayors of Dublin
