= James baronets of Dublin (1823) =

Baronets of the United Kingdom

James baronets
- Escutcheon of the James baronets of Dublin
- Creation date: 1823
- Status: dormant/extinct
- Extinction date: 1979 is a possible extinction date

The James Baronetcy of Dublin was created in the Baronetage of the United Kingdom on 19 March 1823 for John James, Lord Mayor of Dublin from 1821 to 1822 and 1840 to 1841.

== James baronets, of Dublin (1823) ==
- Sir John Kingston James, 1st Baronet (1784–1869)
- Sir John Kingston James, 2nd Baronet (1815–1893)
- Sir John Kingston Fullarton James, 3rd Baronet (1852–1933)
- Sir Gavin Fullarton James, 4th Baronet (1859–1937)
- Sir Edward Albert James, 5th Baronet (1862–1942)
- Sir Fullarton James, 6th Baronet (1864–1955)

=== Dormancy ===
The title became dormant on the death of the sixth Baronet in 1955. The last heir, Gerard Bowes Kingston James, who never established his right to the title, died in 1979, when the baronetcy may have become extinct.

== Notes ==
Baronetage of the United Kingdom
Preceded by Silvester baronets	James baronets of Dublin; 19 March 1823	Succeeded by Arbuthnot baronets
