= Frederick Pile =

British Army general (1884–1976)

General Sir Frederick Pile GCB Bt DSO MC
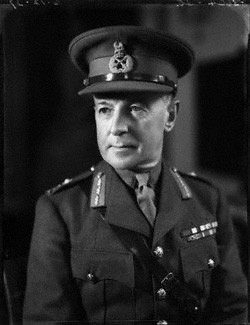
- Sir Frederick Pile in 1937
- Born: 14 September 1884; Dublin, Ireland
- Died: 14 November 1976 (aged 92); London, England
- Military career
- Allegiance: United Kingdom
- Branch: British Army
- Service years: 1904–1945
- Rank: General
- Nickname: "Tim"
- Service number: 3052
- Units: Royal Artillery; Royal Tank Regiment
- Commands: Anti-Aircraft Command (1939–1945); 1st Anti-Aircraft Division (1937–1939); Canal Brigade (1932–1936)
- Conflicts: First World War; Second World War
- Awards: Knight Grand Cross of the Order of the Bath; Distinguished Service Order; Military Cross; Mentioned in Despatches; Commander of the Legion of Merit (United States); Order of the White Eagle (Serbia)

General Sir Frederick Alfred Pile, 2nd Baronet, GCB, DSO, MC (14 September 1884 – 14 November 1976) was a senior British Army officer who served in both World Wars. In the Second World War he was General Officer Commanding Anti-Aircraft Command, one of the elements that protected Britain from aerial attack.

== Early life ==
Pile was born in Dublin as the second child of Sir Thomas Devereux Pile, 1st Baronet and his wife, Caroline Maude Nicholson. Sir Thomas served as the Lord Mayor of Dublin from 1900 to 1901.

Pile had an older sister and two younger brothers. His youngest brother, Cyril John Pile, served in the Royal Flying Corps during the First World War, and was killed in action in 1917.

After attending the Royal Military Academy at Woolwich, Pile was commissioned into the Royal Artillery in July 1904. He initially served in India, together with Britain and South Africa.

== Military career ==
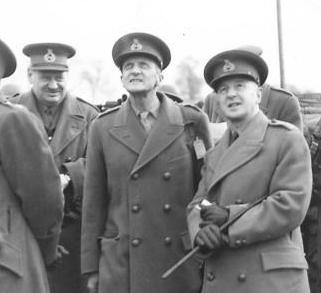
Major General Robert Whittaker (centre left); Lieutenant General Sydney Wason (centre), and Lieutenant General Sir Frederick Pile (centre right) at Anti-Aircraft Command on 14 February 1941 during a visit by David Margesson, the Secretary of State for War.

Pile served in the First World War and was involved in the retreat from Mons and was a staff captain with 1st Division before becoming a brigade major with 40th Division in 1916. In the closing stages of the War he became a General Staff Officer (GSO) with 22nd Corps in France. He was married in 1915, thrice mentioned in dispatches, and awarded both the Military Cross and the Distinguished Service Order during the war.

After the war he was appointed a brigade major at Brighton and Shoreham District. He attended the Staff College, Camberley from 1922 to 1923 and transferred from the RFA to the Royal Tank Corps (later the Royal Tank Regiment) in August 1923, when he was immediately promoted to major. In 1928 he became commander of the 1st Experimental Mechanized Force and assistant director of mechanisation at the War Office. He went to Egypt in 1932 as commander of the Canal Brigade Mechanized Force.

In 1937 he became general officer commanding 1st Anti Aircraft Division. Even before the war started, he foresaw the likely pressures on personnel and investigated whether women would be capable to taking a part in anti-aircraft batteries. He invited Caroline Haslett of the Women's Engineering Society to spend several weekends observing the work of a battery in Surrey, and she advised him that women would certainly be able to do the work, as proved to be the case during the war. In 1939, at the start of the Second World War, he was made general officer commanding-in-chief of Anti-Aircraft Command, a position he held throughout the war. He was the only British general to retain the same command throughout the entire war. After Dunkirk he issued a general order telling his men that they were the only British troops still firing at the enemy. He was to tell the story after the war, in his official dispatch and in his book Ack-Ack: Britain's Defence against Air Attack during the Second World War. His plan for "Engagement of Long Range Rockets with AA Gunfire" (gunfire into a radar-predicted airspace to intercept the V-2 rocket) was ready on 21 March 1945 but the plan was not used due to the danger of shells falling on Greater London.

Tim Pile was considered as CIGS to replace John Dill in October 1941 at Beaverbrook's urging (Pile had been spending weekends with Beaverbrook). Alan Brooke who replaced Dill said that "Tim" Pile had certain valuable qualities but he could not think of a worse selection as CIGS.

In March 1944, MI5 considered him the most likely source of the classified information leak concerning the location of the planned Normandy landings to B. H. Liddell Hart.

Pile was created a Knight Grand Cross of the Order of the Bath (GCB) in the 1945 New Year Honours. After the War he became Director General of Housing with the Ministry of Works.

He was also Colonel Commandant of the Royal Artillery from 1945 to 1952.

== Personal life ==
In 1915 Pile married Vera Millicent Lloyd, with whom he had two sons, Frederick Devereux Pile (1915–2010) and John Devereux Pile (1918–1982). In 1932 he married Hester Mary Melba Phillimore. In 1951, he married Molly Eveline Louise Mary Home.

Pile's elder son, Frederick Pile, served as a major in the Royal Tank Regiment. He won the Military Cross during the British Army's advance into Germany in 1945. He was later promoted to colonel and succeeded to the baronetcy on his father's death in 1976.

== Commemoration ==
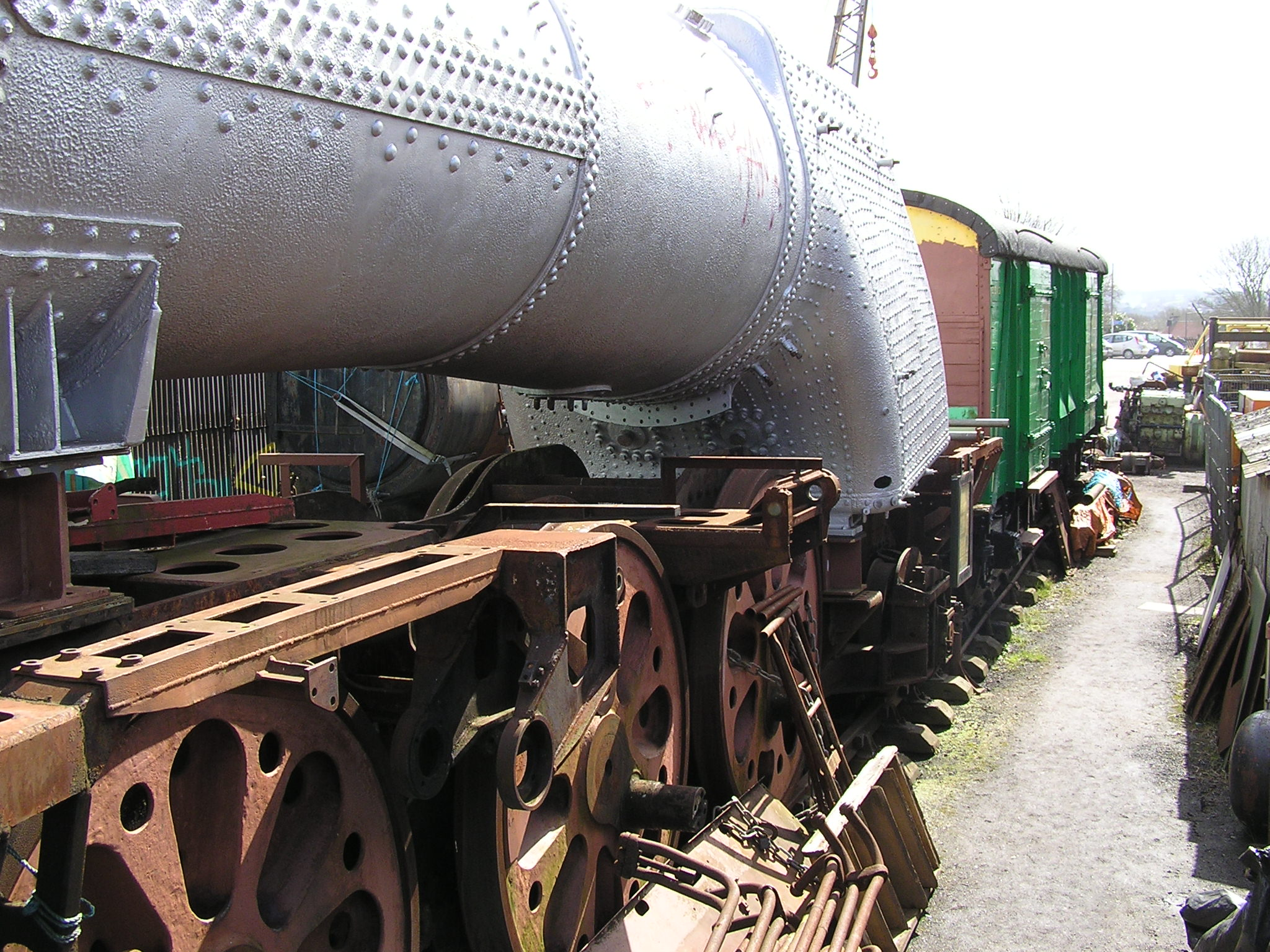
The Battle of Britain class locomotive Sir Frederick Pile at Bitton railway station in 2006

In 1948, a locomotive of the Southern Railway SR Battle of Britain Class was named after Pile at Waterloo station in London. After residing at Woodham Brothers scrapyard in Barry, South Wales it was initially preserved at the Avon Valley Railway for many years, and then moved to the Watercress Line in 2011. Hornby Railways have released a model of this locomotive.

== Arms ==
Coat of arms of Frederick Pile
Crest On a crest coronet Or charged with a cross bourdonée Azure a pelican with wings endorsed and inverted Proper. Escutcheon Azure three piles Argent on a chief Ermine a castle Proper between two harps Or. Motto Sine Labe Nota

== Bibliography ==
- Doherty, Richard (2004). Ireland's Generals in the Second World War. Four Courts Press. ISBN 978-1-85182-865-4.
- Mead, Richard (2007). Churchill's Lions: a biographical guide to the key British generals of World War II. Stroud (UK): Spellmount. ISBN 978-1-86227-431-0.
- Smart, Nick (2005). Biographical Dictionary of British Generals of the Second World War. Barnesley: Pen & Sword. ISBN 1-84415-049-6.

Military offices
Preceded by Sir Alan Brooke	GOC-in-C Anti-Aircraft Command; 1939–1945	Succeeded by Sir William Green
Baronetage of the United Kingdom
Preceded by Thomas Pile	Baronet (of Kenilworth House); 1931–1976	Succeeded by Frederick Devereux Pile
