= Valentine Blake Dillon =

Irish politician (1855–1916)

Lord Mayor of Dublin
- In office 1894–1896
- Preceded by: James Shanks
- Succeeded by: Richard F. McCoy

Personal details
- Born: 1847 County Sligo, Ireland
- Died: 31 March 1904 (aged 56–57) Dublin, Ireland
- Party: Nationalist Party
- Relatives: John Blake Dillon (nephew); John Dillon (cousin)

Valentine Blake Dillon (1847 – 31 March 1904) was an Irish lawyer and politician.

Valentine Blake Dillon was a nephew of John Blake Dillon and cousin of John Dillon. He qualified as a solicitor in 1870, and took part in many high-profile trials, including those related to the Land War.

In 1891 he was the Parnellite candidate in the closely fought North Sligo by-election, but failed to win the seat. He later acted as election agent for James McCann in his successful campaign to win Dublin St Stephen's Green, a seat hitherto held by the Conservatives, and for his successor, Laurence Ambrose Waldron.

From 1894 to 1896, he was Lord Mayor of Dublin.

Civic offices
Preceded by James Shanks	Lord Mayor of Dublin; 1894–1896	Succeeded by Richard F. McCoy
