= George Hoyte =

Irish politician (1791–1843)

Lord Mayor of Dublin
- In office 1838–1839
- Preceded by: Samuel Warren
- Succeeded by: Sir Nicholas William Brady

Personal details
- Born: County Dublin, Ireland
- Died: 15 September 1868 (aged 75)
- Children: 11

George Hoyte (died 15 September 1868) was an Irish merchant and politician.

George Hoyte was the son of William Hoyte. He was Sheriff of Dublin City and a Dublin Corporation alderman. He served as Lord Mayor of Dublin from 1838 to 1839. For many years, Hoyte was vice grandmaster of the Grand Lodge of Ireland.

Hoyte was married and had three daughters and eight sons. He died in September 1868, at the age of 75.

Civic offices
Preceded by Samuel Warren	Lord Mayor of Dublin; 1838–1839	Succeeded by Sir Nicholas William Brady
