= Sir John James, 1st Baronet =

Lord Mayor of Dublin, Ireland

Sir John James

Lord Mayor of Dublin
- In office 1840–1841
- Preceded by: Sir Nicholas William Brady
- Succeeded by: Daniel O'Connell
- In office 1821–1822
- Preceded by: Sir Abraham Bradley King
- Succeeded by: John Smith Fleming

Personal details
- Born: 28 April 1784 County Dublin, Ireland
- Died: 31 December 1869 (aged 85)
- Party: Irish Conservative Party
- Spouse: Charlotte Cash
- Children: 8

Sir John Kingston James, 1st Baronet (28 April 1784 – 1869) was a Dublin wine merchant who was twice elected Lord Mayor of Dublin.

He was the son of Francis James of King's County (now County Offaly). Trading as a wine merchant, he was elected Sheriff of Dublin for 1811–12 and an alderman of Dublin Corporation in 1818. In 1815 he was accepted as a member of the prestigious Dublin Society.

He was elected Lord Mayor of the city for the first time for 1821 to 1822, and was knighted by the Lord Lieutenant, the Marquess of Wellesley, in 1822 and created a baronet (of Dublin) on the 19 March 1823.

He became a director of the Grand Canal Company of Ireland, serving as its chairman in 1826, 1834 and 1842, the Dublin and Drogheda Railway Company and the Bank of Ireland (1845, 1847, 1849, 1851, and 1853–68). In 1840 he was elected Lord Mayor of Dublin for a second annual term.

He died in 1869. He had married Charlotte Rebecca Cash, the daughter of alderman John Cash, with whom he had 8 children and was succeeded in the baronetcy by their eldest son Sir John James, 2nd Baronet. The baronetcy has since become extinct.

Baronetage of the United Kingdom
| New creation | Baronet (of Dublin); 1823–1869 | Succeeded by John James |
Civic offices
| Preceded by Sir Abraham Bradley King | Lord Mayor of Dublin; 1821–1822 | Succeeded by John Smith Fleming |
| Preceded by Sir Nicholas William Brady | Lord Mayor of Dublin; 1840–1841 | Succeeded by Daniel O'Connell |
