= Joseph Meade =

Irish businessman and politician (1839–1900)

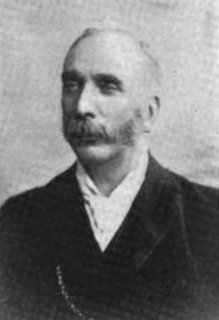
- In The Sketch, 1 August 1900

Lord Mayor of Dublin
- In office 1891–1893
- Preceded by: Edward Joseph Kennedy
- Succeeded by: James Shanks

Personal details
- Born: 1839 Dublin, Ireland
- Died: 14 July 1900 (aged 60–61) Dublin, Ireland
- Resting place: Glasnevin Cemetery
- Party: Irish National League
- Spouse: Ada Willis
- Occupation: Businessman, politician

Joseph Michael Meade (1839 – 14 July 1900) was an Irish businessman and politician.

== Biography ==
He was born in Dublin, son of Michael Meade of Great Brunswick Street, a Catholic and founder of the building and contracting firm of Meade, Michael & Son. Joseph entered the family firm and on his father's death in 1866, and took over as head and greatly expanded it. He eventually employed 900 men and was contracted for major projects.

He was the chairman of numerous boards including the Hibernian Bank and the Globe insurance company, he used his wealth and position to enhance his civic standing. In 1886 he was elected to Dublin Corporation as alderman for Trinity ward, a position he held until his death, and in 1889 he was made Sheriff of Dublin City.

A staunch nationalist, he contributed financially to the Home Rule League and after the split in 1890, he remained a supporter of Charles Stewart Parnell. He was elected Lord Mayor of Dublin in 1891, and re-elected the following year – his princely hospitality in the Mansion House was apparently responsible for his popularity. In the 1892 general election he stood as an Irish National League candidate for Stephen's Green constituency and was narrowly defeated by 15 votes by the liberal unionist William Kenny. It was his first and last attempt for a seat in parliament.

He died at his home in Dublin on 14 July 1900 and is buried in Glasnevin Cemetery. He was survived by his second wife, Ada Willis.

At Meade's death, his property – the bulk of which was in tenements – was valued at £60,000. Nine tenement houses which he owned in Henrietta Street were then auctioned; (including 14 Henrietta Street) these alone had provided him with a gross annual rental of £1,500. In twentieth-century history books he is chiefly remembered as a notorious slum landlord and despoiler of Georgian Dublin; he stripped out original features in the houses he owned and subdivided them. However, he enjoyed a good reputation during his lifetime; his obituaries testify to his geniality, his common sense, and his ability to make friends across the political divide.

Civic offices
Preceded by Edward Joseph Kennedy	Lord Mayor of Dublin; 1891–1893	Succeeded by James Shanks
