= Sir Abraham Bradley King, 1st Baronet =

Irish businessman and politician (1774–1838

Abraham Bradley King

Lord Mayor of Dublin
- In office 1820–1821
- Preceded by: Sir William Stamer
- Succeeded by: Sir John Kingston James
- In office 1812–1813
- Preceded by: William Henry Archer
- Succeeded by: John Cash

Personal details
- Born: 31 March 1774; Dublin, Ireland
- Died: 27 February 1838 (aged 63); Dublin, Ireland
- Spouse: Anne Oulton (m. 1793)
- Children: 8

Sir Abraham Bradley King, 1st Baronet (31 March 1774 – 27 February 1838) was an Irish businessman and politician, who served as Lord Mayor of Dublin from 1812 to 1813 and again from 1820 to 1821.

Abraham Bradley King was born on 31 March 1774, the second son of James King and Elizabeth Bradley. In 1801, he was Sheriff of Dublin City. On 30 January 1805, he was elected an alderman of Dublin Corporation. He inherited his grandfather's bookbinding company, and became the official king's stationer.

He served as Lord Mayor of the city from 1812 to 1813 and again from 1821 to 1822. On 6 November 1821, he was created a Baronet of Corrard in the County of Fermanagh, by George IV.

King was married to Anne Oulton in 1793. They had two sons and six daughters, including his heir, Sir James Walker King, 2nd Baronet (1796–1874). He died in 1838 at the age of 63.

Baronetage of the United Kingdom
New creation	Baronet (of Fermanagh); 1821–1838	Succeeded by James Walker King
Civic offices
Preceded by William Henry Archer	Lord Mayor of Dublin; 1812–1813	Succeeded by John Cash
Preceded by Sir William Stamer	Lord Mayor of Dublin; 1820–1821	Succeeded by Sir John Kingston James
