= King baronets of Corrard (1821) =

The King Baronetcy, of Corrard in the County of Fermanagh, was created in the Baronetage of the United Kingdom on 6 November 1821 for Abraham Bradley King, an Irish businessman and local politician., who had been Lord Mayor of Dublin for 1812–13. The title became extinct on the death of the 3rd Baronet in 1921.

== King baronets, of Corrard (1821) ==
- Sir Abraham Bradley King, 1st Baronet (1774–1838)
- Sir James Walker King, 2nd Baronet (1796–1874)
- Sir Charles Simeon King, 3rd Baronet (1840–1921) married in 1891 Sophia Louisa, daughter and heiress of Robert Snow Bolton-Davis, of Swerford Park, Swerford, Oxfordshire.

== Notes ==
Baronetage of the United Kingdom
Preceded by Chichester baronets	King baronets of Corrard; 6 November 1821	Succeeded by FitzGerald baronets
