= John Knox (mayor) =

Irish merchant and civic official

Sir John Knox (c.1608 – 3 November 1687) was an Ulster Scots merchant and civic official in Dublin.

Knox was the son of William Knox of Lifford and Fingwel Florence Campbell, daughter of Sir Dugald Campbell, 1st Baronet.

He settled in Dublin in the 1650s, becoming a successful merchant. He was Sheriff of Dublin City in 1675 and was elected Lord Mayor of Dublin in 1685. On 6 February 1585 he was knighted by Henry Hyde, 2nd Earl of Clarendon in his capacity as Lord Lieutenant of Ireland. On 29 December 1685 Knox received a grant by Privy Seal giving him exclusive rights to produce copper coinage for the Kingdom of Ireland for a period of 21 years. Upon his death without an heir in 1687, the patent for coinage production passed to his brother-in-law, Colonel Roger Moore.

Civic offices
Preceded by Sir Abel Ram	Lord Mayor of Dublin; 1685–1686	Succeeded by Sir John Castleton
