= Royal Irish Institution =

Former cultural institution in Dublin, Ireland

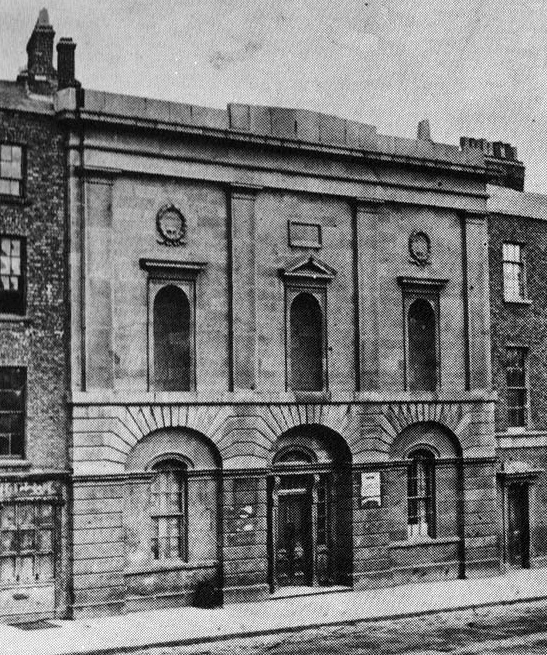
- Headquarters of the RII which lasted from 1829-66
- Formation: 1813
- Type: Cultural institution
- Headquarters: 5 College Street, Dublin
- Location: Dublin, Ireland
- Patron: The Prince Regent (later George IV)
- President: Duke of Leinster

The Royal Irish Institution (RII) was a Dublin-based art institution established in 1813 to encourage the displaying of fine arts in Ireland.

One object was to start an academy in Dublin resulting in the establishment of the Royal Hibernian Academy in 1823 and a gallery was opened in 1829 where old masters could be exhibited.

== History ==
The institution was established following a public meeting in the Rotunda on 24 June 1813 (Note: Pettigrew & Oulton's 1847 Dublin Almanac and General Register of Ireland states 4 June as the founding date) with the object of stimulating native talent by furnishing models to assist the labours of Irish artists and by rewarding the authors of works of superior merit. To this end old masters works were gathered together to be displayed.

An exhibition of esteemed old paintings had never taken place in Ireland and a national gallery did not exist for such events. In the 18th century Irish noblemen and gentleman had brought several collections to Ireland but had been dispersed due to deaths or sold in England, while access to such collections had generally been only by favour. The Society of Artists in Ireland had earlier established an organisation in 1764 with 12 members including Simon Vierpyl and Richard Cranfield with a dedicated exhibition space at what is now City Assembly House however this organisation only exhibited until 1780 when it disbanded.

The organisation's first exhibition was held at the Royal Dublin Society's House on Hawkins Street. The first and later exhibitions displayed works by "esteemed masters of the old Italian, Spanish, Dutch, and Flemish schools" including works by artists such as William Hogarth and Joshua Reynolds.

The permanent gallery, in College Street was designed by Frederick Darley and opened in 1829. The gallery space was 40 feet long and 30 feet wide and was 19 feet high up to the cove. It was demolished in 1866 and replaced by the Provincial Bank of Ireland's headquarters. As of June 2023, the building houses the Westin Hotel, Dublin.

The institution held eight exhibitions between 1814 and 1832 but was forced to close due to financial troubles.

=== Royal Irish Art Union ===
A later Royal Irish Art Union was established in 1839 and also held its meetings at the RII's headquarters on College Street. The organisation lasted until 1851 but ultimately also ceased operations.

== See also ==
- Royal Dublin Society
- Royal Hibernian Academy
- Royal Irish Academy
- Society of Artists in Ireland
