= Richard F. McCoy =

Irish politician (1855–1916)

Lord Mayor of Dublin
- In office 1896–1898
- Preceded by: Valentine Blake Dillon
- Succeeded by: Daniel Tallon

Personal details
- Born: c. 1855; County Limerick, Ireland
- Died: 16 March 1916 (aged 60–61); County Limerick, Ireland
- Political party: Nationalist Party
- Spouse: Marion Reynolds (m. 1883)
- Children: 8

Richard Francis McCoy (c. 1855 – 13 March 1916) was an Irish politician and businessman. He was a member of Dublin Corporation, and served as Lord Mayor of Dublin from 1896 to 1898. He was High Sheriff of Dublin in 1894.

He married Marion Reynolds in 1883, and they had eight children. He died on 13 March 1916 in Rathkeale, County Limerick, aged 60.

Civic offices
Preceded by Valentine Blake Dillon	Lord Mayor of Dublin; 1896–1898	Succeeded by Daniel Tallon
