= Nicholas William Brady =

Irish politician (1791–1843)

Lord Mayor of Dublin
- In office 1839–1840
- Preceded by: George Hoyte
- Succeeded by: Sir John Kingston James

Personal details
- Born: 16 February 1791 County Dublin, Ireland
- Died: 28 November 1843 (aged 52)
- Spouse: Catherine Hodgson (m. 1815)
- Children: 6
- Relatives: Maziere Brady (brother)

Sir Nicholas William Brady (16 February 1791 – 28 November 1843) was an Irish politician. He was elected to Dublin Corporation in 1833, and served as Lord Mayor of Dublin from 1839 to 1840.

Nicholas William Brady was the eldest son of Francis Tempest Brady and had two brothers and eight sisters. His brother Maziere Brady later became Lord Chancellor of Ireland.

He was High Sheriff of Dublin in 1820. He was knighted by King George IV. In October 1815, he married Catherine Hodgson, and they had six children including William Maziere Brady, clergyman and historian.

Civic offices
Preceded by George Hoyte	Lord Mayor of Dublin; 1839–1840	Succeeded by Sir John Kingston James
