= Sir William Stamer, 1st Baronet =

Irish politician (1764–1838

William Stamer

Lord Mayor of Dublin
- In office 1819–1820
- Preceded by: Sir Thomas McKenny
- Succeeded by: Sir Abraham Bradley King
- In office 1809–1810
- Preceded by: Frederick Darley
- Succeeded by: Nathaniel Hone

Personal details
- Born: 1764 County Dublin, Ireland
- Died: 14 January 1838 (aged 73–74) County Dublin, Ireland
- Spouse: Martha Rawlins (m. 1791)
- Children: 6
- Relatives: Lovelace Stamer (grandson); William Donovan Stamer (great-great-grandson)

Sir William Stamer, 1st Baronet (1764 – 14 January 1838) was an Irish politician, who served as Lord Mayor of Dublin from 1809 to 1810 and again from 1819 to 1820.

William Stamer was born in 1764, the son of Thomas Stamer and Catharine Lovelace. In 1795 he became Sheriff of Dublin City. He was elected as an alderman of Dublin Corporation on 7 July 1800, and served as Lord Mayor of Dublin from 1809 to 1810 and again from 1819 to 1820. Stamer was also the city's police magistrate for many years. On 15 December 1809, he was created a Baronet of Beauchamp in the County of Dublin.

Stamer was married to Martha Rawlins on 24 September 1791. They had two sons and four daughters. Stamer died on 14 January 1838, at the age of 74, at his home in County Dublin. His eldest son, Lovelace Stamer (1797–1860), inherited his title as the 2nd Baronet.

Stamer Street in the Portobello area of Dublin is named for him.

Baronetage of the United Kingdom
New creation	Baronet (of Beauchamp, Dublin); 1809–1838	Succeeded by Lovelace Stamer
Civic offices
Preceded by Frederick Darley	Lord Mayor of Dublin; 1809–1810	Succeeded by Nathaniel Hone
Preceded by Sir Thomas McKenny	Lord Mayor of Dublin; 1819–1820	Succeeded by Sir Abraham Bradley King
