= Thomas Pile =

Irish politician (1856–1931)

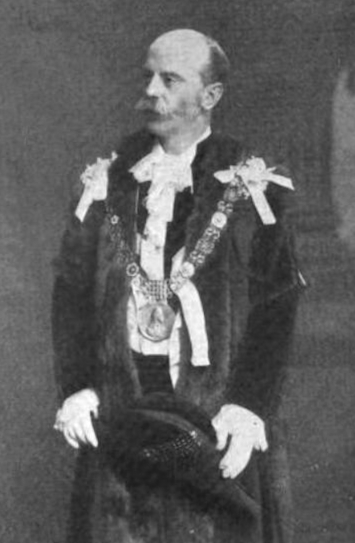
- In The Sketch, 4 April 1900

Lord Mayor of Dublin
- In office 1900–1901
- Preceded by: Daniel Tallon
- Succeeded by: Timothy Harrington

Personal details
- Born: 27 February 1856
- Died: 17 January 1931 (aged 74) London, England
- Party: Nationalist Party
- Spouse: Caroline Nicholson (m. 1882)
- Children: 4, including Frederick
- Education: Wesley College, Dublin
- Occupation: Politician

Sir Thomas Devereux Pile, 1st Baronet (27 February 1856 – 17 January 1931) was an Irish politician, and a member of the Irish Home Rule movement.

== Biography ==
Thomas Pile was born on 2 February 1856, the son of Thomas Pile and Anne Poole. He was educated at Wesley College, Dublin. His brother was the builder James Philip Pile.

He married Caroline Nicholson on 3 May 1882, and they had four children, including Frederick Pile.

He was a member of Dublin Corporation for the Fitzwilliam ward. He held the office of Sheriff of Dublin City in 1898, and became the Lord Mayor of Dublin in 1900. He was a Protestant, and a moderate nationalist.

In 1900 Queen Victoria visited Dublin to pay tribute to the Irish troops who fought in the Boer War. Pile proposed that Dublin Corporation should give her an address of welcome. Nationalist members were split on the motion, and a heated debate ensued, ending with the motion being carried by 30 votes to 22. This was controversial: the nationalist papers denounced him as a traitor, Maud Gonne referred to him as a "groveling unionist fishmonger", and at the Saint Patrick's Day parade his coach was surrounded by an angry mob singing "We’ll hang Tommy Pile on a sour apple tree". The queen arrived on 4 April 1900, and was duly received by Pile. On 24 September 1900, Pile was created 1st Baronet Pile, of Kenilworth House, Rathgar, County Dublin. He was the last titled person to be lord mayor of Dublin.

Pile died in London on 17 January 1931, at the age of 74.

Coat of arms of Thomas Pile
Crest On a crest coronet Or charged with a cross bourdonée Azure a pelican with wings endorsed and inverted Proper. Escutcheon Azure three piles Argent on a chief Ermine a castle Proper between two harps Or. Motto Sine Labe Nota

== Sources ==
- Murphy, James H. (2020). The Politics of Dublin Corporation, 1840–1900. Four Courts Press.
- O'Brien, Joseph V. (1982). Dear, Dirty Dublin: A City in Distress, 1899–1916. University of California Press.

Baronetage of the United Kingdom
New creation	Baronet (of Kenilworth House); 1900–1931	Succeeded by Frederick Pile
Civic offices
Preceded by Daniel Tallon	Lord Mayor of Dublin; 1900–1901	Succeeded by Timothy Harrington
