= James Shanks (Irish politician) =

Irish politician

Lord Mayor of Dublin
- In office 1893–1894
- Preceded by: Joseph Meade
- Succeeded by: Valentine Blake Dillon

Personal details
- Born: 1845 Belfast, Ireland
- Died: 17 December 1926 (aged 80–81) Dublin, Ireland

James Shanks (1845 – 17 December 1926) was an Irish politician. He was born in Belfast and moved to Dublin about 1865, eventually becoming managing director of a mineral water company. He was a member of Dublin Corporation, and served as Lord Mayor of Dublin from 1893 to 1894. He was High Sheriff of Dublin in 1891. He was a Protestant Home Ruler and Parnellite.

He visited New York City in September 1893, and The New York Times described him as "Perhaps the finest looking man who stepped ashore from the Campania yesterday". He was involved in the Irish International Exhibition of 1907.

In the 1923 Irish general election he stood unsuccessfully in Dublin South as "Business Men's candidate".

Civic offices
Preceded by Joseph Meade	Lord Mayor of Dublin; 1893–1894	Succeeded by Valentine Blake Dillon
