= College Street, Dublin =

Street in central Dublin, by Trinity College

College Street
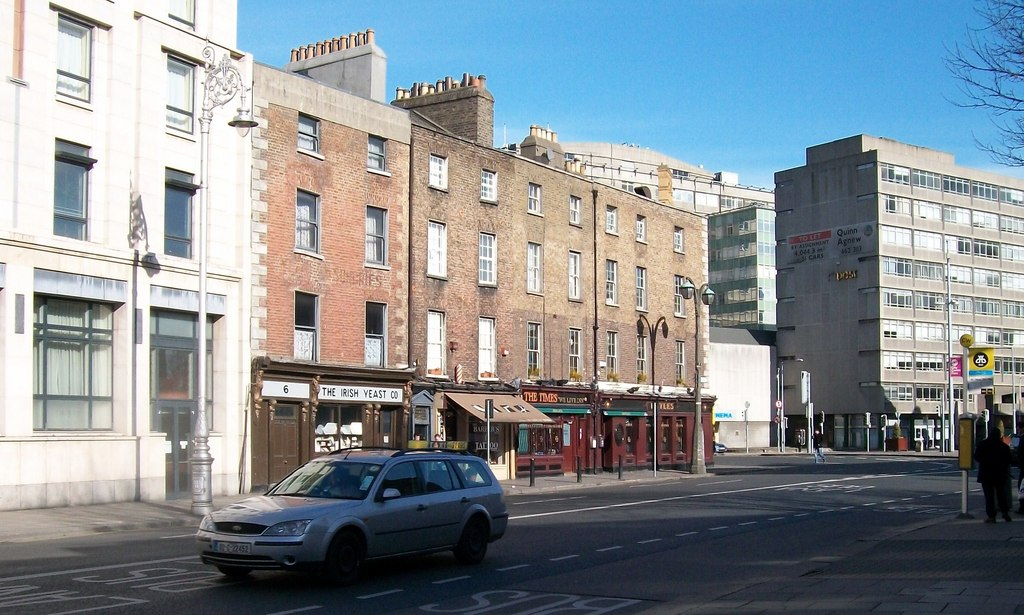
- Shops on College Street in 2010

- Location within Central Dublin
- Native name: Sráid an Choláiste (Irish)
- Length: 160 m (520 ft)
- Width: 24 metres (79 ft)
- Location: Dublin, Ireland
- Postal code: D02
- Coordinates: 53°20′44″N 6°15′29″W
- Southwest end: College Green
- Northeast end: Pearse Street

Other
- Known for: Trinity College, College Green Hotel

College Street (Irish: Sráid an Choláiste) in Dublin follows the curve of Trinity College. It runs from College Green in the west to Pearse Street in the east. It lies in the "Mansion House A" Electoral Division of Dublin. It was described by the prolific engraver Mary Milner as "one of the most spacious of the noble thoroughfares of the Irish metropolis."

== History ==
A late 1990s archeological excavation discovered evidence that archaeological remains, some ecclesiastical, might be found with further exploration. The work determined that land, lying on a buried gravel bank, had been reclaimed in the 17th century when the River Steine, which previously flowed through Fleet Street towards Westmoreland Street, had affected the street and was flooded by the River Liffey before being piped underground.

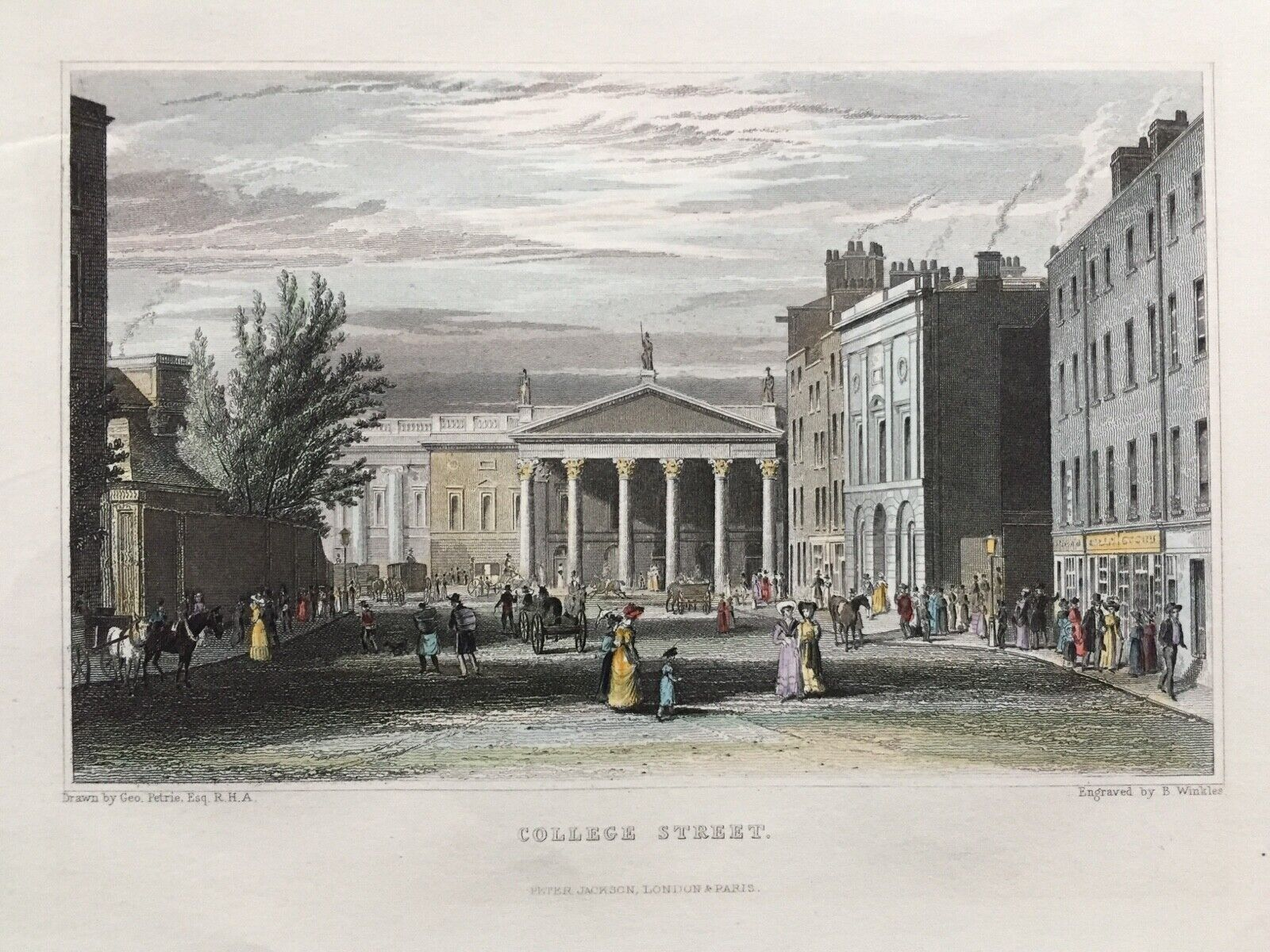
Bank of Ireland's eastern portico viewed along College Street

College Street provides an impressive view of the eastern portico of the Bank of Ireland building, originally the entrance to the Irish House of Lords with its six tall Corinthian pillars surmounted by statues of Fortitude, Justice, and Liberty.

On 14 August 1849, College Street and all the space in front of the bank's eastern portico brimmed with thousands of people awaiting the arrival of Queen Victoria, sometimes dubbed "The Famine Queen", on her first visit to Ireland. The street was so crowded that a large number of people gathered on the roof of the bank, surrounding the statues of Fortitude, Justice, and Liberty as they "looked forth" – a sight described as "very novel and picturesque" in The Gallery of Engravings (1850) edited by Mary Milner.

== Buildings ==
In the late 1700s, the Bank of Ireland were seeking new premises, and considered the old Custom House but they found a more suitable site. This was a triangular shape of the Wide Streets Commissioners' proposed development for what is now Westmoreland Street, D'Olier Street, both created in 1800, and College Street. The College Street frontage would have been 320 feet (98 m) long. The bank's proposal to build there was approved in July 1799. Before the site was cleared, the old Parliament House, Dublin, became available so the bank requested they be allowed to vacate their commitment to the College Street site on the basis that the old parliament house was immediately available, and it would be several years before the College, Westmoreland, D'Olier Streets site would be completed and their building erected. This was allowed though compensation was demanded of the bank. Major modifications and construction took place between 1805 and 1806 and continued for several years after the building was opened to the public on 6 June 1808.

The Royal Irish Institution, an organisation promoting fine arts, was based at No.5 College Street. The building was constructed by Frederick Darley in 1829. It was demolished in 1866 and replaced with the Provincial Bank of Ireland, constructed by William George Murray. The building was redeveloped into the Westin Hotel in 1998, which extends onto Westmoreland Street. This involved demolishing four other buildings along College Street. Conservationists attempted to block this redevelopment and preserve the buildings; in the event, the later Victorian shop facades were preserved.

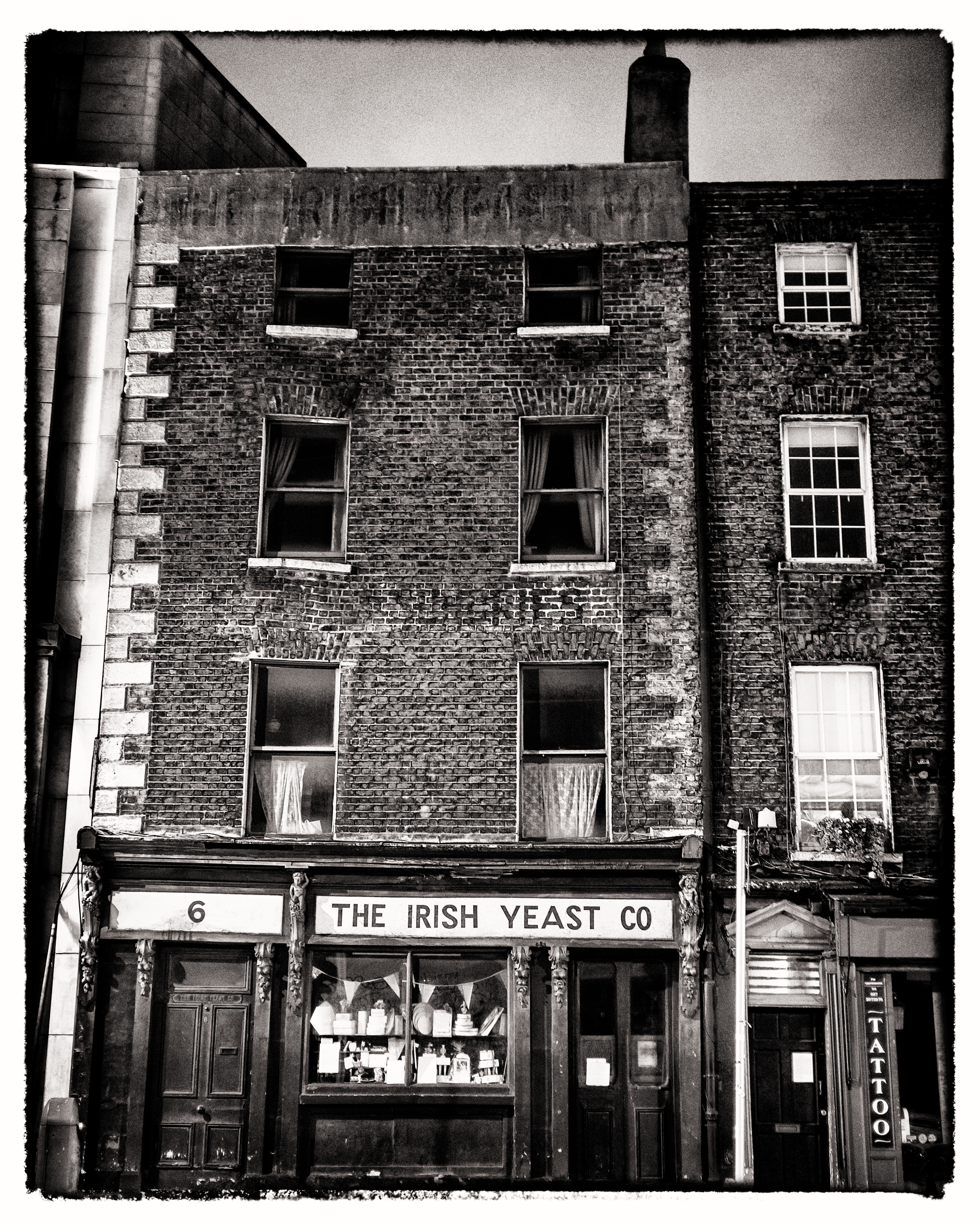
Irish Yeast Company, opened in 1890 and closed in 2017

Number 6 College Street, a four-storey over basement red brick building, was built about 1820. A robe maker, Elizabeth Hawkins, traded in the premises in 1862. In 1890 it became a retail shop to the bakery trade, called the Irish Yeast Company opened by a barrister Henry West. The last owner, John Moreland, whose family acquired the shop in the 1930s, started working there in the 1940s when he left school and run the shop until it closed. When Moreland, who lived above the shop, became ill in 2017, the shop ceased operation. He died on 18 July 2017. The building was sold in 2018 for €850,000 and the new owners, who own properties in Fleet Street whose buildings back onto College Street include a pub Bowe's. They applied for planning permission to enlarge Bowe's pub by incorporating the Irish Yeast Company premises but were refused because it would "seriously injure the special architectural and historic character and integrity." A revised plan was again rejected in 2021 but Dublin County Council overruled An Bord Pleanála on 31 January 2024 by allowing the development of a "cafe/bar and reception area and three apartments in the late Georgian building that has been vacant since 2018 and is in a state of disrepair. Conservation and restoration are needed to this "a very important historic building" as noted by the Dublin County Council and An Bord Pleanála.

== Structures ==
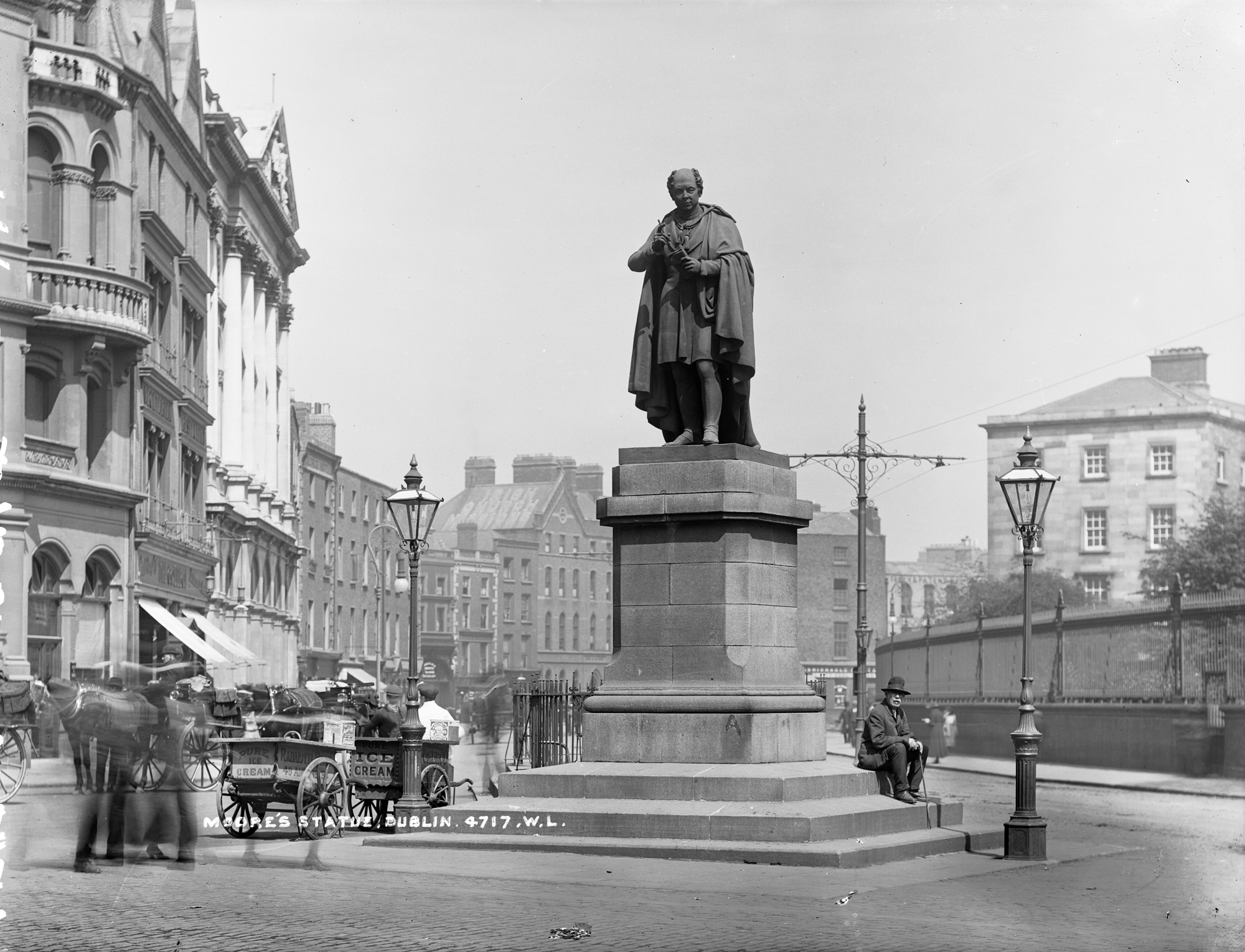
Thomas Moore statue, circa 1910, with ice cream carts and Trinity College railing on right

The Crampton Memorial was constructed in 1862 on a site in the centre of the eastern (Pearse Street) end of College Street. It partially collapsed in 1959 and was subsequently demolished. There is now a sculpture at the eastern end, named "Steyne" after an Old Norse word meaning "stone". It was created by Cliodhna Cussen and installed in 1986. At the western end there is a statue of composer Thomas Moore, erected in 1857 by Christopher Moore.

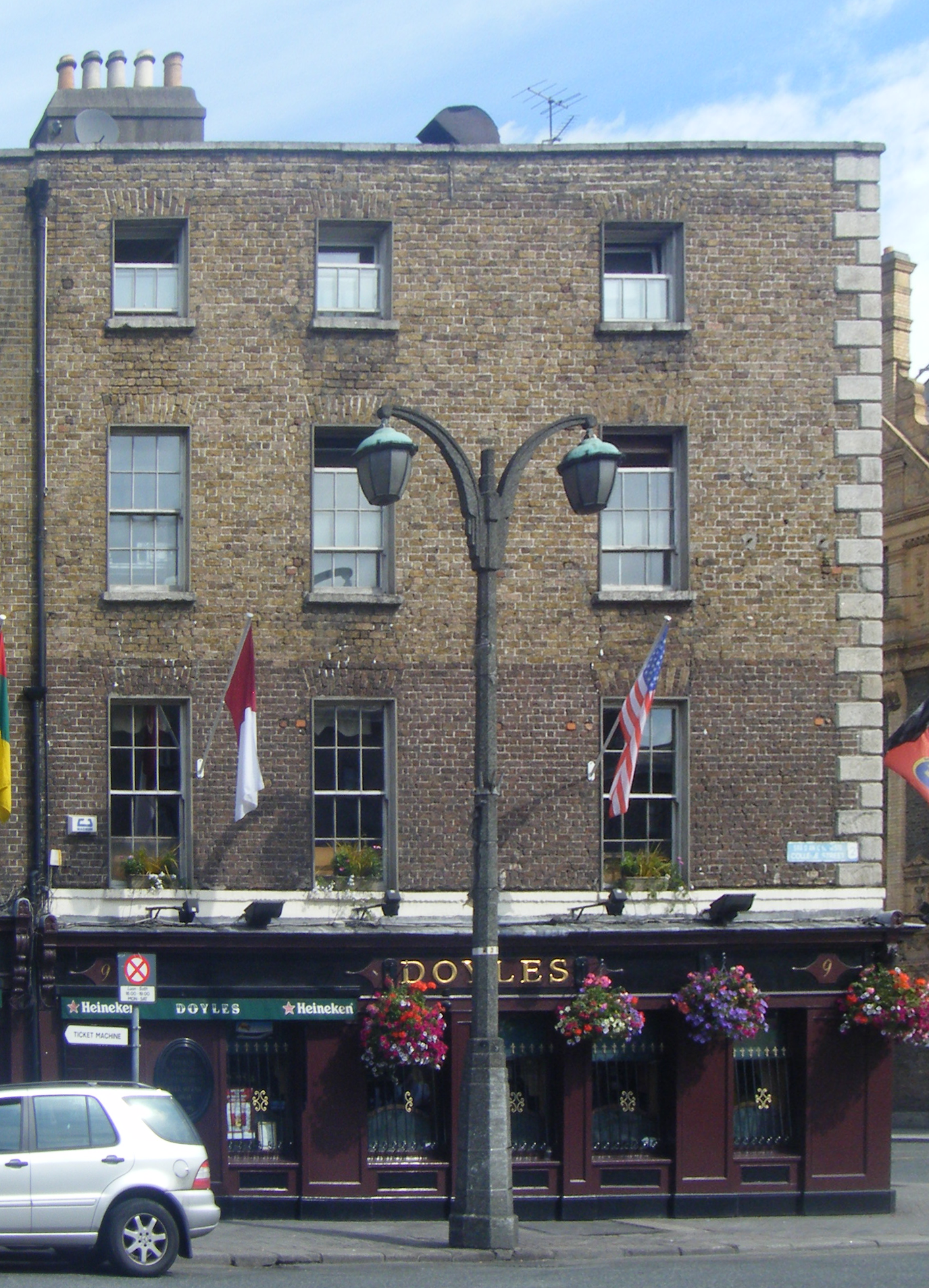
Ornate cement lamps outside Doyle's pub in 2009: demolished in 2021

On the traffic island behind the Moore statue was one of Dublin's remaining underground public toilets. (Its railings are visible behind the adjacent Moore statue photograph.) It was a legacy of 19th-century Dublin, a time when travelling took much longer and few households had toilets installed. The toilet facility was demolished in April 2016 during the construction of the Luas Cross City line route through College Street. It had been there for about 100 years. Anti-social problems such as drug abuse, prostitution and vandalism had forced its closure in the 1990s. A development plan to open the facility as a bar with a takeaway cafe was shelved due to the Luas plans. The Moore statue was removed and reinstated following demolition and reconstruction of the island along with a small green space where the toilet entrance stood.

The street had pairs of French art deco street lanterns on top of ornate cement lampposts, along with several other Dublin streets including O'Connell Street, O'Connell Bridge and College Green. They were installed by the Dublin Corporation between 1936 and 1939, changing from earlier cast-iron standards. As of July 2020, there was only one pair remaining in College Street, outside Doyle's pub. It has been demolished since October 2021.

== Traffic ==
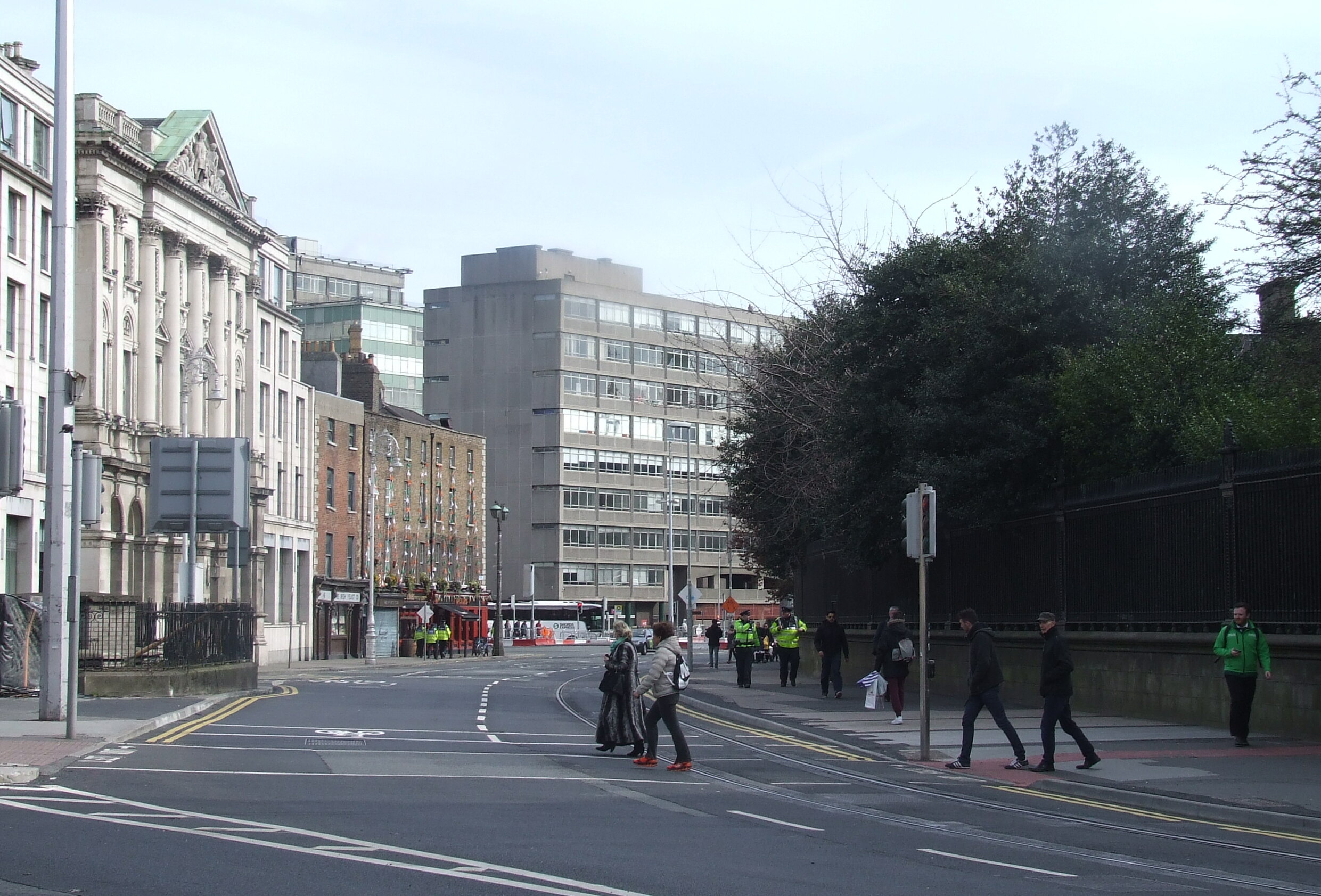
2016 view facing east towards Hawkins House before the Luas line construction

When the Luas Cross City Line was extended in 2017, including a new Trinity Luas stop, up to 30% of buses were removed from the usual route along College Street, including a stop on the Trinity College side. Complaints were aired in the Dáil Éireann about the congestion and overcrowding of buses because of the work, saying the plans were not thought out well.

To facilitate the flow of public transport, stated by the Irish Independent as having "significant delays", from 29 May 2023 private cars no longer have access to College Street, as well and through College Green in either direction. Prior to the new 24-hour ban, access was not permitted on Monday to Friday during the hours of 7 am to 7 pm.

== Cultural references ==
College Street's former Dublin Metropolitan Police station appears in James Joyce's Ulysses:

A squad of constables debouched from College street, marching in Indian file. Goosestep. Foodheated faces, sweating helmets, patting their truncheons. After their feed with a good load of fat soup under their belts. Policeman’s lot is oft a happy one. They split up in groups and scattered, saluting, towards their beats. Let out to graze. Best moment to attack one in pudding time. A punch in his dinner. A squad of others, marching irregularly, rounded Trinity railings making for the station. Bound for their troughs. Prepare to receive cavalry. Prepare to receive soup.

— "Lestrygonians"

== Sources ==
- Bennett, Douglas (2005). The Encyclopaedia of Dublin. Gill & Macmillan. ISBN 978-0-717-13684-1.
- Casey, Christine (2005). Dublin: The City Within the Grand and Royal Canals and the Circular Road with the Phoenix Park. Yale University Press. ISBN 978-0-30010-923-8.
