= William Donovan Stamer =

Major-General William Donovan Stamer CB CBE DSO MC
- Stamer pictured shortly before his retirement from the army in 1948
- Born: 14 June 1895; Keele, Staffordshire, England
- Died: 21 September 1963 (aged 68); Eastbourne, East Sussex, England
- Military career
- Allegiance: United Kingdom
- Branch: British Army
- Service years: 1914–1948
- Rank: Major-General
- Service number: 4225
- Unit: North Staffordshire Regiment
- Commands: General Officer Commanding Sudan and Eritrea (1945–48); 131st Infantry Brigade (1942); 1st Sudan Defence Force Brigade (1942); 161st Indian Infantry Brigade (1941–42); 161st Infantry Brigade (1941); 1st Battalion, North Staffordshire Regiment (1938–40)
- Conflicts: First World War; Arab revolt in Palestine; Second World War
- Awards: Companion of the Order of the Bath; Commander of the Order of the British Empire; Distinguished Service Order; Military Cross; Mentioned in Despatches (3); Officer of the Legion of Merit (United States)

Major-General William Donovan Stamer, CB, CBE, DSO, MC (14 June 1895 – 21 September 1963) was a British Army officer who was commissioned into the North Staffordshire Regiment at the outbreak of the First World War and served in the army until retirement in 1948, finishing his career with the temporary rank of major-general and serving as General Officer Commanding Sudan and Eritrea.

== Early life ==
Stamer was born in Keele, Staffordshire, the eldest son and third child of the Reverend Frederick Stamer and Ethel Donovan. His paternal grandfather was the 3rd Baronet Stamer, Lovelace Stamer. After being educated at Rugby School, Stamer attended the Royal Military College, Sandhurst and was commissioned as a second lieutenant into the North Staffordshire Regiment on 19 August 1914 (just two weeks after Great Britain declared war on Germany), although this was subsequently backdated to 8 August 1914.

== First World War ==
Stamer joined the 1st Battalion of the North Staffordshire Regiment on the Western Front, then serving as part of the 17th Brigade of the 6th Division, in November 1914 and was promoted to lieutenant in December 1914. After a period as an acting captain, Stamer was promoted to captain in March 1917. In November 1917 he was mentioned in despatches by Field Marshal Sir Douglas Haig, Commander-in-Chief (C-in-C) of the British Expeditionary Force (BEF) on the Western Front, and about the same time was appointed the battalion adjutant. Stamer was still the battalion adjutant when the German Army launched its Spring Offensive in March 1918. On the first day of the offensive the battalion headquarters position was overrun and Stamer led a rearguard action despite during which he was wounded in the head. For his actions on that day he was awarded the Military Cross, the citation read:

For conspicuous gallantry and devotion to duty. He directed the defence of battalion headquarters when the enemy had broken through in a fog. He showed fine courage and energy, and was of the utmost assistance to his commanding officer in a very desperate situation.

— "No. 30901". The London Gazette (Supplement). 13 September 1918. p. 11018.

It was July before he returned to duty and in September he was appointed as second-in-command of the battalion with the rank of acting major. In the closing weeks of the war Stamer assumed command of the battalion when, during the Battle of the Selle, the commanding officer was severely wounded and continued to command the battalion until the Armistice with Germany and after, being appointed an acting (later temporary) lieutenant colonel.

== Between the wars ==
In 1920, Captain Stamer was seconded for service with the Egyptian Army until 1925, from 1925 until 1930 he was attached to the Sudan Defence Force and it was not until 1930 that he rejoined the North Staffords. From 1933 to 1936 he was officer commanding the regimental depot at Lichfield and was promoted to Major in 1933

From the depot he joined the regiment's 2nd Battalion who were, in 1937, in Palestine under the command of Lieutenant Colonel William Robb. On Christmas Day 1937, Stamer was commander of a small force comprising two companies of his own battalion and a company of the 1st Battalion, Border Regiment on operations against Arab raiders from Syria. Stamer's force came under fire and in an engagement that lasted most of the day Stamer's men inflicted 25 to 30 casualties upon their enemies while suffering less casualties themselves. Stamer was awarded the Distinguished Service Order for his leadership during the engagement. The citation read:

During the operations on 25th December 1937, against the Arab armed bands in the Tiberias district, Major Stamer, who was in charge of a mixed column, displayed fine leadership, discretion and gallantry. At a critical moment, when his advanced guard, composed of young soldiers recently arrived from England, was pinned to the ground by frontal and enfilade fire, losing one officer and one N.C.O., Major Stamer organized and led in person an attack on that portion of the enemy's position which was causing him most trouble. The attack was very effective and accounted for a number of enemy casualties. Later in the day Major Stamer organized and withdrew his column over difficult ground with great skill and without further casualties, Throughout the whole action his conduct was an inspiration to those under his command and it is very largely due to his fine leadership that the enemy was dealt a crippling blow.

— Awards and Mentions in Despatches recommended by the G.O.C. British Forces in Palestine and Trans-Jordan

A further Mention in Despatches also arose from Stamer's involvement in the operations in Palestine during 1937–1938. Stamer was promoted to lieutenant colonel in December 1938 and appointed to command 1st Battalion, North Staffordshire Regiment, then stationed in India as part of the Poona Independent Brigade.

== Second World War ==
By late 1940 Stamer was seconded from command of the 1st Battalion and moved to an appointment within Middle East Command. Made an acting Colonel he was area commander for Sollum and later Benghazi, work which resulted in him being appointed a Commander of the Order of the British Empire in July 1941. The citation read:

For excellent work as Area Commander. Col. STAMER was mainly responsible for the organisation of the Port of Sollum. This entailed dealing with the off-loading and disposal of stores and embarkation of prisoners of war. Much of the work was carried out in face of heavy bombing attacks. Later Col. STAMER was transferred to BENGHAZI as Area Commander. Here he tackled the many problems connected with Italian and Arab civilian populations and Italian prisoners of war with his usual efficiency and drive

— Archibald Wavell

A temporary Colonel from May 1941, later in the year Stamer had assumed command of 161st Infantry Brigade (later 161st Indian Infantry Brigade) then on garrison duties in Cyprus with the rank of temporary brigadier. This was a short lived command as in May 1942 he was appointed command of 1st Sudan Defence Force Brigade. A further move followed shortly and Stamer was appointed to command 131st Infantry Brigade and led it at the Second Battle of El Alamein. Later in the war Stamer was Mentioned in Despatches for a third time.

== Post war ==
Following the end of the war, Stamer was appointed to the post of General Officer Commanding British Troops in Sudan and Eritrea, with the acting rank of major-general. A further honour upon him in the same year was to be appointed Colonel of the Regiment for the North Staffordshire Regiment, a post he held for ten years.

In 1947 he was honoured by the American government with the award of Officer of the Legion of Merit and a year later was appointed a Companion of the Order of the Bath. A final substantive promotion to the substantive rank of brigadier followed in March 1948, before he retired in November 1948 with the honorary rank of major-general.

Military offices
Preceded by William Ramsden	Commandant of the Sudan Defence Force; 1945–1948	Succeeded by Lashmer Whistler
Honorary titles
Preceded by Louis John Wyatt	Colonel of the North Staffordshire Regiment; 1945–1955	Succeeded by C. R. A. Swynnerton
