= Lovelace Stamer =

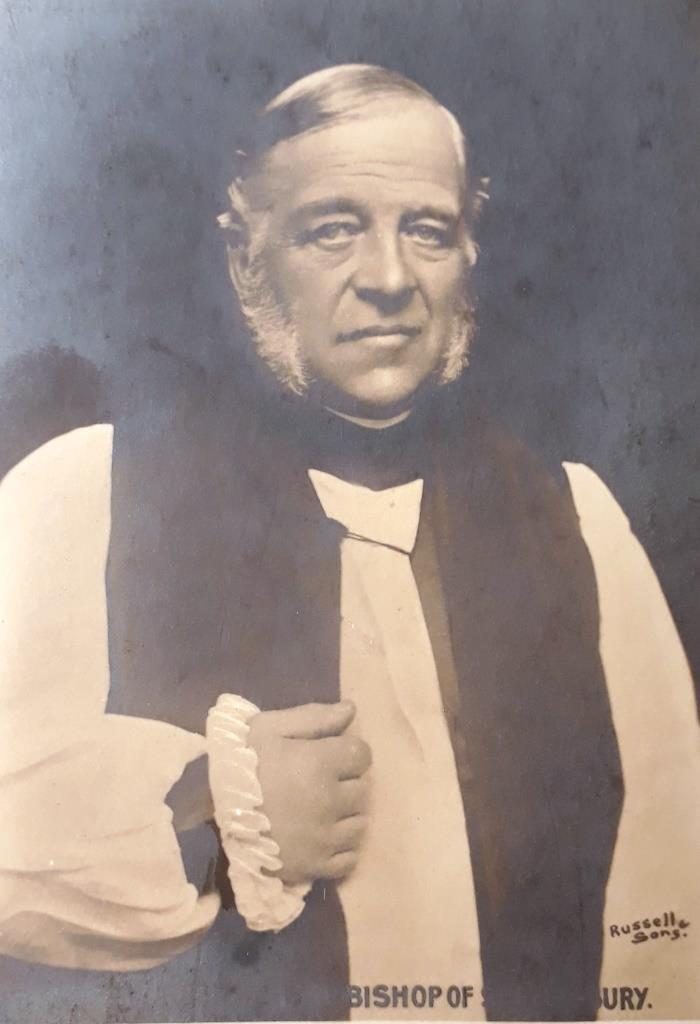
The Bishop of Shrewsbury (1888-1906) Sir Lovelace Stamer Bt

The Right Reverend Sir Lovelace Tomlinson Stamer, 3rd Baronet, VD (18 October 1829 – 29 October 1908) was the first Anglican Bishop of Shrewsbury in the modern era.

== Early life and education ==
Lovelace Stamer was born in York into an Anglo-Irish noble family, the son of Sir Lovelace Stamer, 2nd baronet and his wife Caroline Tomlinson. He succeeded to the family baronetcy, originally created in 1809 for his grandfather Sir William Stamer, twice Lord Mayor of Dublin, following the death of his father in 1860.

He was educated at Rugby and Trinity College, Cambridge, where he took part in his college's first rowing crew and graduated BA in 1835 and MA in 1856. He was later awarded the degree of Doctor of Divinity (DD) in 1888.

== Career ==
Stamer was Ordained priest in 1855, and began his career with curacies at Clay Cross, Derbyshire, in 1853-54 and Turvey in 1854. There then followed a short spell as Curate-in-charge at Long Melford, Suffolk.

In 1858, Stamer succeeded his uncle, J W Tomlinson, as Rector of Stoke-on-Trent, a position he was to hold for 34 years. When he arrived at Stoke, there was one Anglican parish church (now known as Stoke Minster) in the growing Potteries town. He led an improvement in local ministry to the area, leaving it with four Anglican churches, and five school or mission churches.

Stamer was also keenly interested in education, helping found night schools for working men in 1863, and was Chairman of the Stoke Schools Board from its founding in 1871. He took part in local government by serving as Chief Bailiff of Stoke (equivalent to the later mayor of the borough) in 1867–68. He was from 1860 honorary chaplain to the area's volunteer infantry force, later the 1st Volunteer Battalion, North Staffordshire Regiment, and was ultimately awarded the Volunteer Decoration (VD).

Stamer was made a prebendary of Lichfield Cathedral in 1875 and served as Archdeacon of Stoke from 1877 until he was elevated to the episcopate in 1888 as Suffragan Bishop of Shrewsbury. In Shrewsbury he was known for protesting over urban housing conditions and, as chaplain to its corporation, municipal corruption, for almost two decades until retiring due to illness in 1906. Whilst he was Bishop of Shrewsbury, he was also Rector of St Chad's Church, Shrewsbury from 1892 to 1896 and then of Edgmond from 1896 to 1905. In the latter parish, he built new schools for local children, founded a working men's club and reading rooms, and paid for a new water supply system

== Marriage and children ==
On 16 April 1857 Stamer married Ellen Isabel Dent (1837 - 1933), daughter of Joseph Dent of Ribston Hall, Yorkshire. They had eight children:

- Ellen Caroline Stamer (29 January 1858 - 27 March 1946)
- Lt Col Sir Lovelace Stamer, 4th Baronet (4 April 1859 - 1 October 1941)
- The Reverend Frederick Charles Stamer (28 August 1860 - 14 May 1952)
- Mabel Frederica Stamer (12 July 1862 - 16 April 1918)
- William Edward Stamer (25 January 1864 - 16 December 1945)
- The Reverend Reginald Dent Stamer (2 September 1865 - 4 February 1951)
- Arthur Cowie Stamer (7 March 1869 - 14 February 1944)
- Evelyn Lucinda Stamer (9 April 1871 - 2 May 1958)

== Death ==
Stamer died at Penkridge, Staffordshire on 29 October 1908 at the age of 79 and was buried in Stoke at Hartshill Cemetery. He was succeeded in the baronetcy by his eldest son, Lovelace. A hundred years on from his death, his contribution to the area was honoured at a centenary service.

== Notes ==
Baronetage of the United Kingdom
Preceded by Lovelace Stamer	Baronet (of Beauchamp); 1860–1908	Succeeded by Lovelace Stamer
