= Stamer baronets =

Baronetcy in the Baronetage of the United Kingdom

The Stamer Baronetcy, of Beauchamp, Dublin, is a title in the Baronetage of the United Kingdom. It was created on 15 December 1809 for William Stamer, who was Lord Mayor of Dublin in 1809 and 1819.

The Right Reverend Sir Lovelace Stamer, 3rd Baronet, was Suffragan Bishop of Shrewsbury in the Diocese of Lichfield from 1888 to 1905.

== Stamer baronets, of Beauchamp (1809) ==
- Sir William Stamer, 1st Baronet (1764–1838)
- Sir Lovelace Stamer, 2nd Baronet (1797–1860)
- The Right Reverend Sir Lovelace Tomlinson Stamer, 3rd Baronet VD (1829–1908)
- Sir Lovelace Stamer, 4th Baronet (1859–1941)
- Sir (Lovelace) Anthony Stamer, 5th Baronet (1917–2012)
- Sir Peter Tomlinson Stamer, 6th Baronet (born 1951)

The heir apparent is the present holder's only son William Peter Alexander Stamer (born 1983).

Baronetage of the United Kingdom
Preceded by Alexander baronets	Stamer baronets of Beauchamp, Dublin; 15 December 1809	Succeeded by Congreve baronets
