= Frederick Darley (alderman) =

Irish builder, alderman, and police magistrate

Lord Mayor of Dublin
- In office 1808–1809
- Preceded by: Hugh Trevor
- Succeeded by: Sir William Stamer

Personal details
- Born: 1764 Dublin, Ireland
- Died: 29 June 1841 (aged 76–77) Dublin, Ireland
- Spouse: Elizabeth Guinness (m. 1785)
- Children: 20, including Frederick Jnr
- Relatives: Hugh Darley (granduncle); Arthur Guinness (father-in-law)

Frederick Darley (1764 – 29 June 1841) was an Irish builder, alderman, police magistrate, lord mayor and developer.

== Life and family ==
Frederick Darley was born in Dublin, and baptised on 6 July 1764. His father was a successful public works contractor, Henry Darley (1721?–1798). His mother was Henry's first wife, Mary née Steele (died 1770). Darley's great grandfather, also Henry (died 1728?), was a quarry owner in Newtownards, County Down, and the extended Darley family were established in Dublin as builders and stonemasons. George Darley, the poet, was a distant relative. Darley attended a school run by Sisson Darling in Mabbott Street, at the same time as Theobald Wolfe Tone.

In 1785, Darley married Elizabeth Guinness (1762–1847), the daughter of Arthur Guinness. They had at least seven sons out of their 20 children, who included the architect Frederick, John (1799?–1836), Henry (1800?–1883), William Frederick (1806–1898) a county court judge, and Benjamin Guinness (1808?–1886) a medical doctor. Darley died on 29 June 1841.

== Career ==
By the 1790s, Darley is listed as living at 88 Lower Abbey Street and working as a "stone cutter". By this time, he was working on Carlisle Bridge. He was described as "among the most eminent architects of the kingdom" in 1802, he worked as a builder and developer. It is likely he was involved in the development of Mountjoy Square, and other areas in north Dublin city. From 1816 to 1824, he was employed by Trinity College Dublin as a stonecutter, working with his uncle George at first.

He was a member of the merchants' guild, and from there began his career in Dublin municipal politics. He served as joint Sheriff of Dublin City from 1798 to 1799, alderman from 1800, and Lord Mayor of Dublin from 1808 to 1809. He was appointed a police magistrate in 1808 and chief police magistrate in 1812. Darley was an Orangeman from the foundation of the first lodge in Dublin in June 1796. He was a supported of George Robert Dawson in his campaign for parliament, despite Dawson's support for catholic emancipation.

Civic offices
| Preceded by Hugh Trevor | Lord Mayor of Dublin; 1808–1809 | Succeeded by Sir William Stamer |
