= Daniel Tallon =

Irish politician

Lord Mayor of Dublin
- In office 1898–1900
- Preceded by: Richard F. McCoy
- Succeeded by: Thomas Pile

Personal details
- Born: 1836 County Wicklow, Ireland
- Died: 13 July 1908 (aged 71–72) Dublin, Ireland
- Party: Nationalist Party

Daniel Tallon (1836 – 13 July 1908) was an Irish politician and businessman. He was a member of Dublin Corporation, and served as Lord Mayor of Dublin from 1898 to 1900.

He was born in Rathdrum, County Wicklow in 1836. He was a wine and spirits merchant. For over twenty years he was either vice-chairman or chairman of the Licensed Grocers' and Vintners' Protection Association.

In 1890, in which year he was elected to Dublin Corporation for the Mansion House ward. He was High Sheriff of Dublin in 1895. He became Lord Mayor of Dublin in 1898, and was re-elected in 1899.

While lord mayor, he setup the Mansion House Committee's Relief Fund to alleviate poverty in rural Ireland. A road in Castletownbere is named after him.

In 1904 Tallon lost his corporation seat and left politics. He died on 13 July 1908 at his home in Rathmines. James Joyce mentions him in Ulysses and Finnegans Wake.

Civic offices
Preceded by Richard F. McCoy	Lord Mayor of Dublin; 1898–1900	Succeeded by Thomas Pile
