= Frederick Darley (architect) =

Irish architect

- Born: 1798; Dublin, Ireland
- Died: 1872 (aged 73–74); Dún Laoghaire, County Dublin
- Occupation: Architect
- Relatives: Frederick Darley Senior (father); Henry Darley (grandfather); Moses Darley (great grandfather); Hugh Darley (great granduncle)
- Buildings: Merchants' Hall; Trinity Church, Dublin; Bethesda Chapel, Dublin (1840); Royal Irish Institution

Frederick Darley (1798–1872) was an Irish architect who designed and built a number of buildings in Dublin, including in Trinity College Dublin. He was also responsible for a number of civic and church buildings across Ireland.

== Life ==
He was the second son of 20 children of the builder and architect Frederick Darley Senior, and his father served as Lord Mayor of Dublin in 1808–1809. His mother was Elizabeth (Guinness) Darley, eldest daughter of Arthur Guinness of Beaumont, Dublin.

At age 14, Darley was sent to work under Francis Johnston at the Office of Public Works. By the 1820s, he had established his reputation, designing Merchants' Hall and King's Inns Library, Henrietta Street. Along with Johnston, other strong influences on Darley's style are John Semple and Joseph Welland.

From 1833 to 1843, Darley was the Ecclesiastical Commissioners architect for the Church of Ireland Diocese of Dublin. Darley was succeeded by his pupil John McCurdy as architect to Trinity College Dublin.

Darley was a founding member of the Royal Institute of the Architects of Ireland (RIAI) and lived on Lower Fitzwilliam Street, Dublin.

== Notable buildings ==
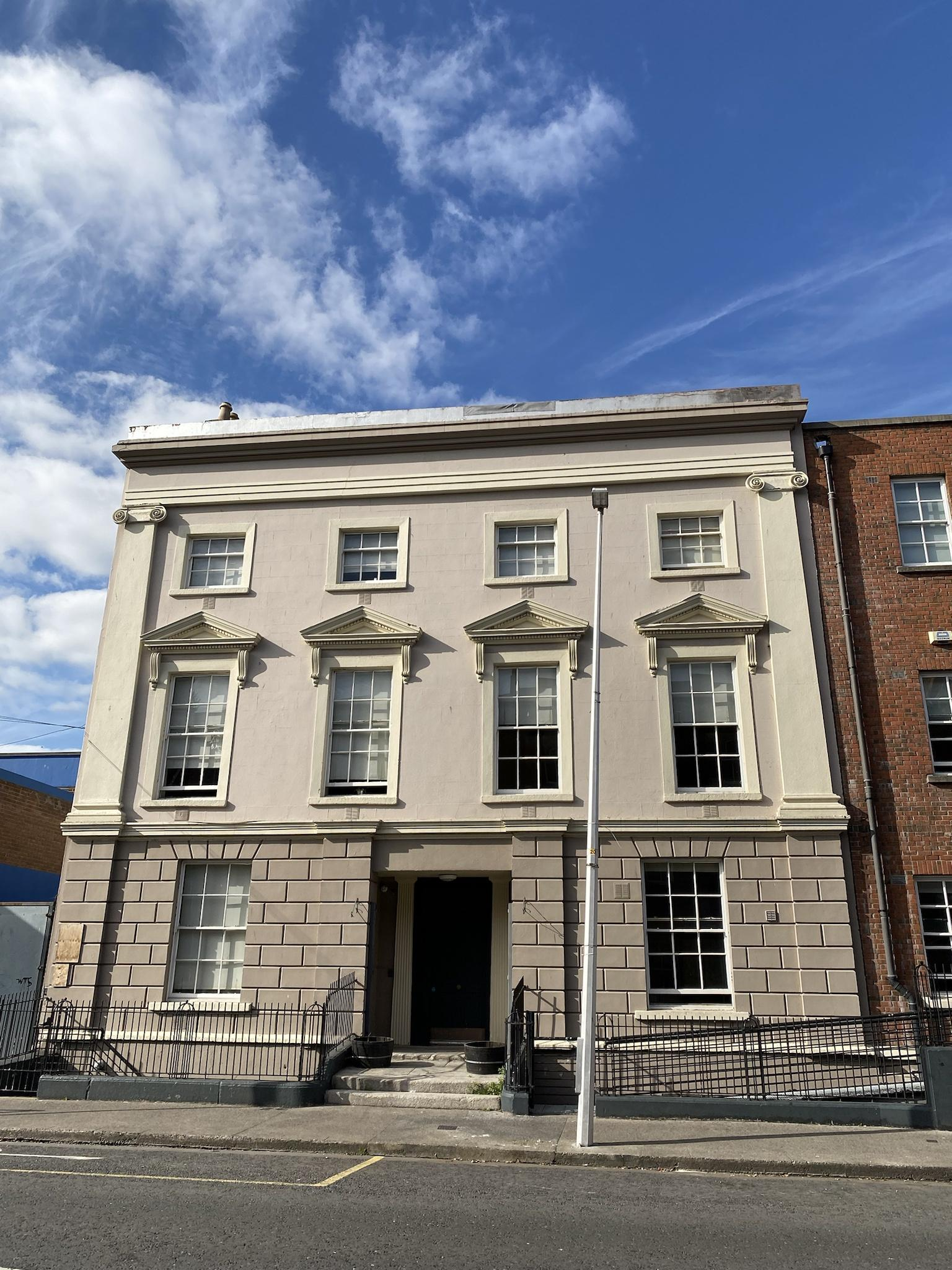
Carpenters' Asylum, Sean McDermott Street

- New Square, Trinity College Dublin.
- Carpenter's Asylum, 35 Seán McDermott Street (formerly Gloucester Street) (1832)
- Trinity Church, Dublin, which became The Exchange, on Gardiner Street.
- Bethesda Chapel, Dublin, former Church of Ireland church on Dorset Street (1840 rebuild) (demolished).
- Royal Irish Institution, College Street, Dublin (demolished 1866)
- Coolbawn House, County Wexford
