= High Street, Dublin =

Street in Dublin, Ireland

High Street
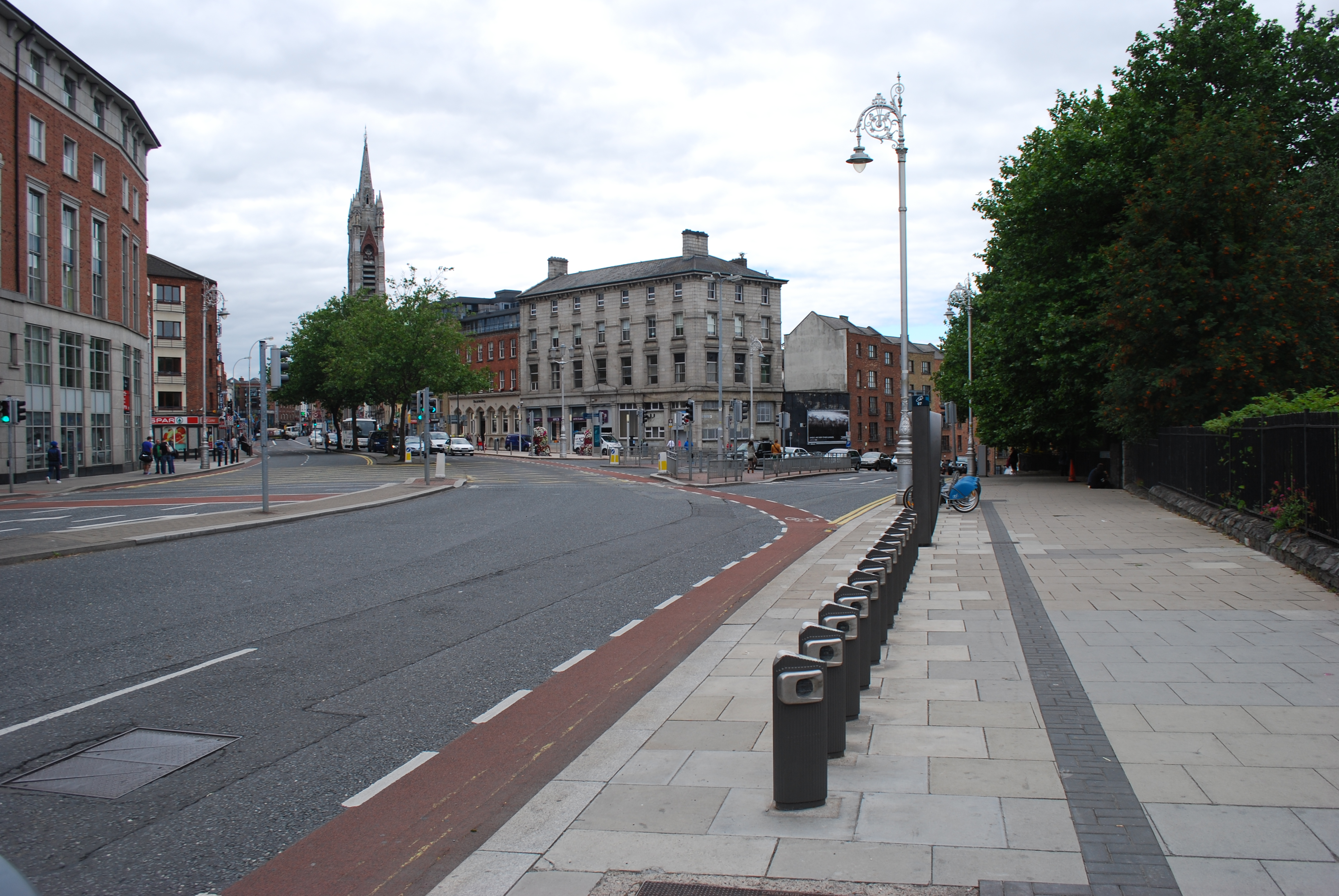
- View of High Street in 2013 with dublinbikes stand

- Location within Central Dublin
- Native name: An tSráid Ard (Irish)
- Namesake: a High Street, named for its high location and its centrality to the town
- Length: 200 m (660 ft)
- Width: 23 metres (75 ft)
- Location: Dublin, Ireland
- Postal code: D08
- Coordinates: 53.34314°N 6.27335°W
- west end: Cornmarket, Bridge Street Upper
- east end: Winetavern Street, Nicholas Street, Christchurch Place

Construction
- Construction start: Has been a settlement site since the 5th century

Other
- Known for: Medieval history; Christ Church Cathedral; Dublinia; St. Audoen's Church (CoI); St. Audoen's Church (RC)

High Street (Irish: An tSráid Ard) is a street in the medieval area of Dublin, Ireland.

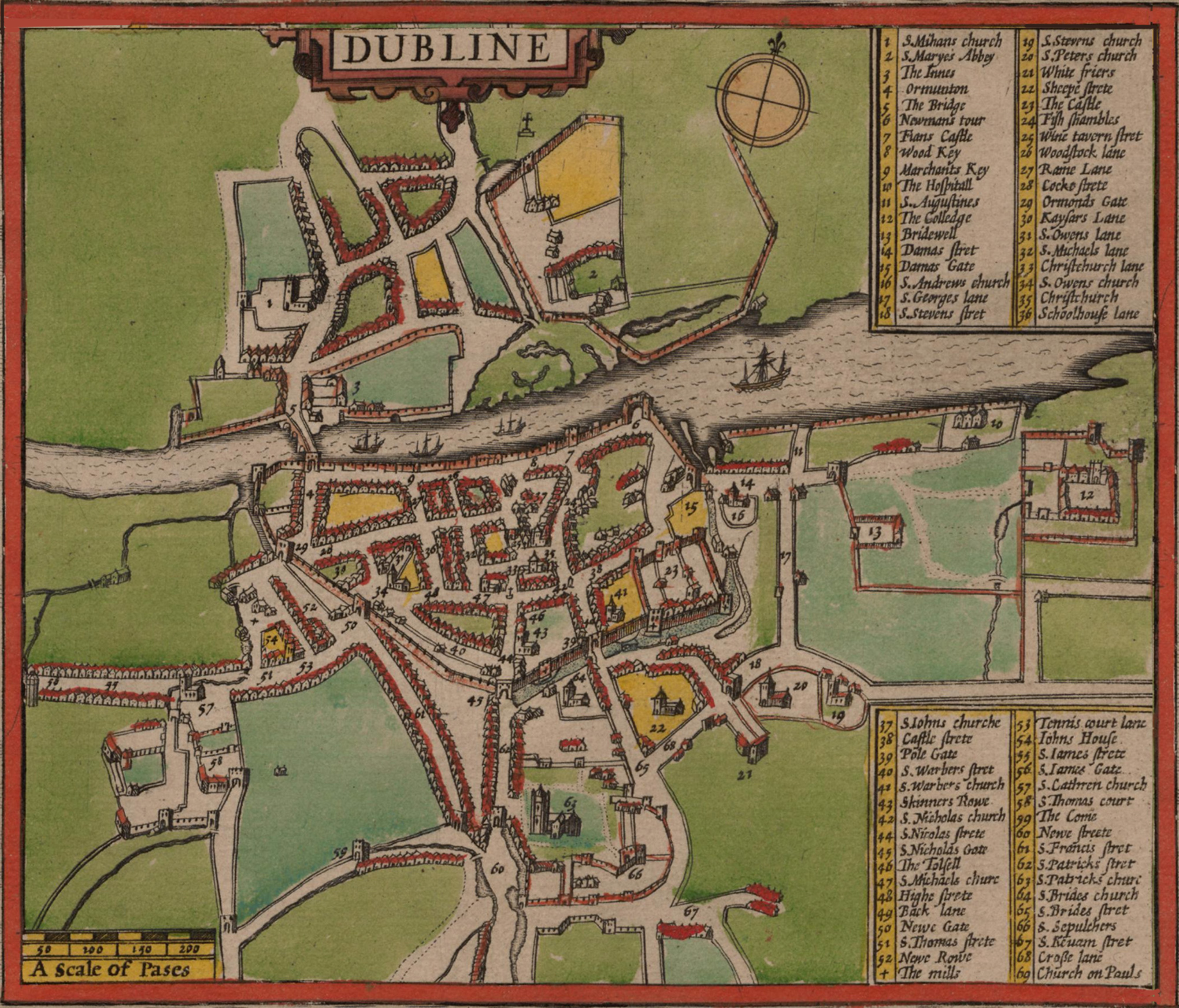
Map of Dublin in 1610; High Street is marked with "48."

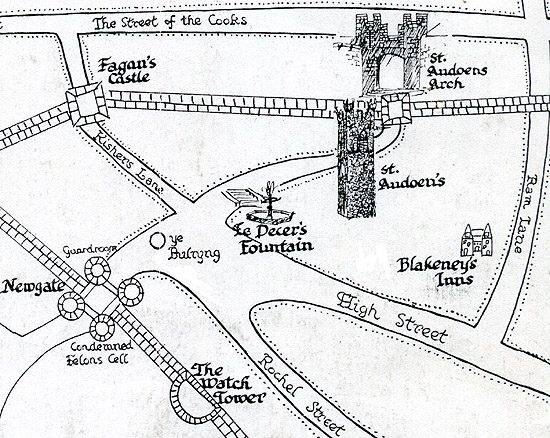
Map of late medieval Dublin with city wall and High Street.

== Location ==
High Street runs parallel to the River Liffey, on high ground about 200 metres to its south, with Christ Church Cathedral on its east side, in the centre of what was medieval Dublin.

== History ==
=== Esker Riada ===
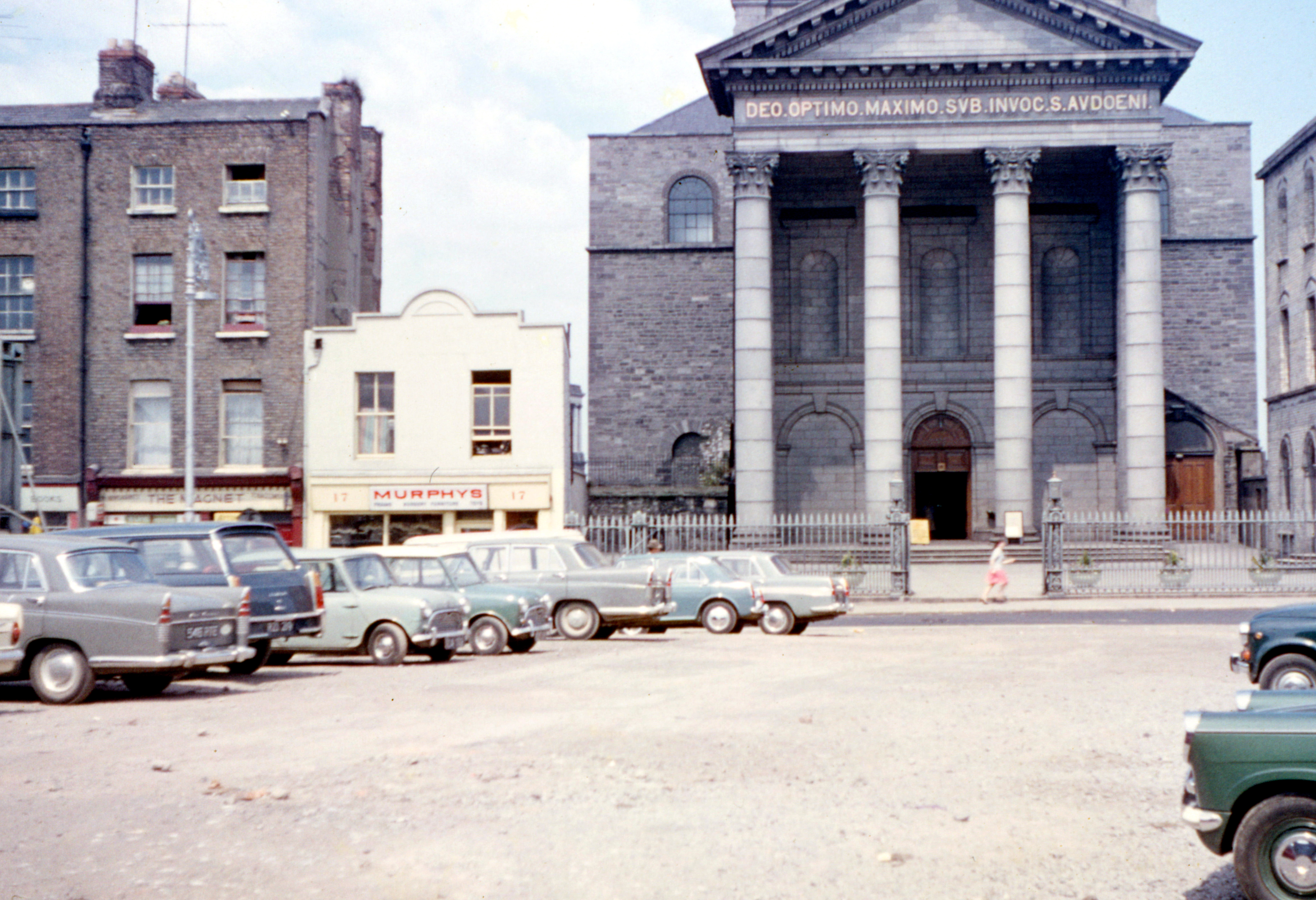
Front of St Audoen's Church (Catholic) in the 1960s.

This ridge of elevated land to the south of the Liffey was the traditional eastern terminus of the Slighe Mhór ("Great Way") that cut Ireland in half in prehistoric times, running along the Esker Riada. A community of farming and fishing Gaelic Irish people lived here by the 5th century AD, with a defensive fort in the vicinity of Cornmarket and High Street. In Anglo-Norman records the street was referred to as "altus vicus".

=== Cornmarket ===
High Street was one of the most important trading positions in the old city, and a corn exchange, or market, was established. A charter of King John enacted that "no foreign merchants should buy corn, hides or wool from any but the citizens". From the 1200s onwards, large quantities of corn were traded and exported from the site. It was subsequently relocated to a dedicated Corn Exchange building at Burgh Quay in the early 1800s. Nothing remains of the original Cornmarket now except for the name which has been attached to a small section of road where High Street meets Thomas Street.

=== Viking and medieval era ===
High Street was at the centre of Viking Dublin and medieval Dublin (9th–13th centuries); Christ Church Cathedral is located immediately on its northeast end. It is south of the Viking settlement site at Wood Quay, and east of Dublin Castle; it was the main street in the medieval period. Patrick FitzLeones, who was three times Mayor of Dublin in the late fifteenth century, bought a house on High Street in 1473.

St. Michael's Church was first built in 1076 and St. Audoen's Church was built on the north side of High Street in 1190. A marble cistern to contain the municipal water supply was built there in 1308. It was commonly called Le Decer's Fountain, in memory of John Le Decer, four times Mayor of Dublin, who paid for the construction of the cistern.

=== 1600s onwards ===
The first General Post Office of Ireland opened on High Street in 1688; it moved to Fishamble Street in 1689.

From the 18th-century onward, the urban core shifted eastwards, and High Street is no longer a shopping street. St Audoen's Church (Catholic) was built in the 1840s next to the ancient Protestant church.

An excavation took place in 1962–63; found were several Viking pieces of artwork: bone trial-pieces and a gilt bronze disc-brooch of the Borre Style design, a bronze needle case, and a soapstone ingot-mould. The trades practised in the Viking period (10th–11th century) included comb making, leather working and weaving.

The street was excavated again in 1968–71; finds included post and wattle houses, leather shoes and boots, bone objects, metalwork, pottery, coins, animal bones, a Rome pilgrim badge from the early 13th century, a lead seal of Pope Innocent III, a spoon bit, and wood-turning waste.

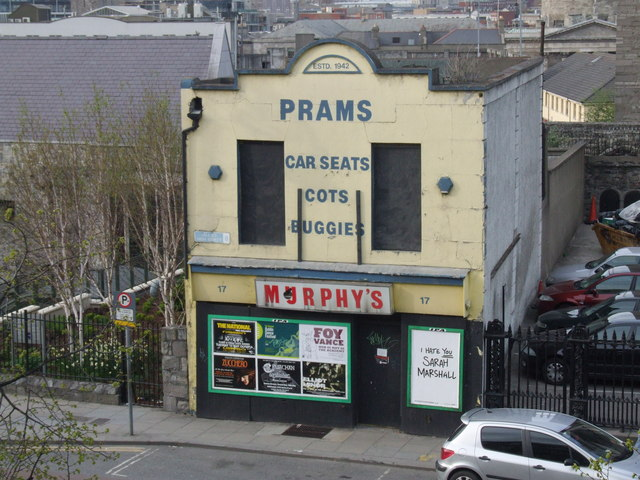
Murphy's Prams, the only commercial building to survive the 1970s demolitions.

In the 1970s, many of the street's commercial buildings were demolished so that it could be widened to a dual carriageway. For a period of time following the road widening, the street was mostly derelict and vacant sites. According to The Encyclopaedia of Dublin, many of the eighteenth and nineteenth-century houses on the street were demolished with the widening of High Street and Bridge Street, including the Winstanley Memorial Hall at nos. 1-2.

In 1993, Christ Church's synod hall was converted to Dublinia, a tourist attraction which educates people about Viking Dublin.

== Cultural references ==
High Street is mentioned in Sheridan Le Fanu's short story "Narrative of a Ghost of a Hand."

== See also ==
- List of streets and squares in Dublin
