= Walter de Fulburn =

English-born statesman and cleric

Walter de Fulburn, or de Fulbourn (died 1307) was a leading English-born statesman and cleric in medieval Ireland, who held the offices of Bishop of Waterford, Bishop of Meath and Lord Chancellor of Ireland.

He was born in the village of Fulbourn in Cambridgeshire, to a distinguished family, several of whose members played a leading part in Irish politics. His brother Stephen de Fulbourn (died 1288) was Walter's predecessor as Bishop of Waterford and Archbishop of Tuam 1286-1288; their nephew Adam de Fulbourn also held several clerical and judicial offices in Ireland.

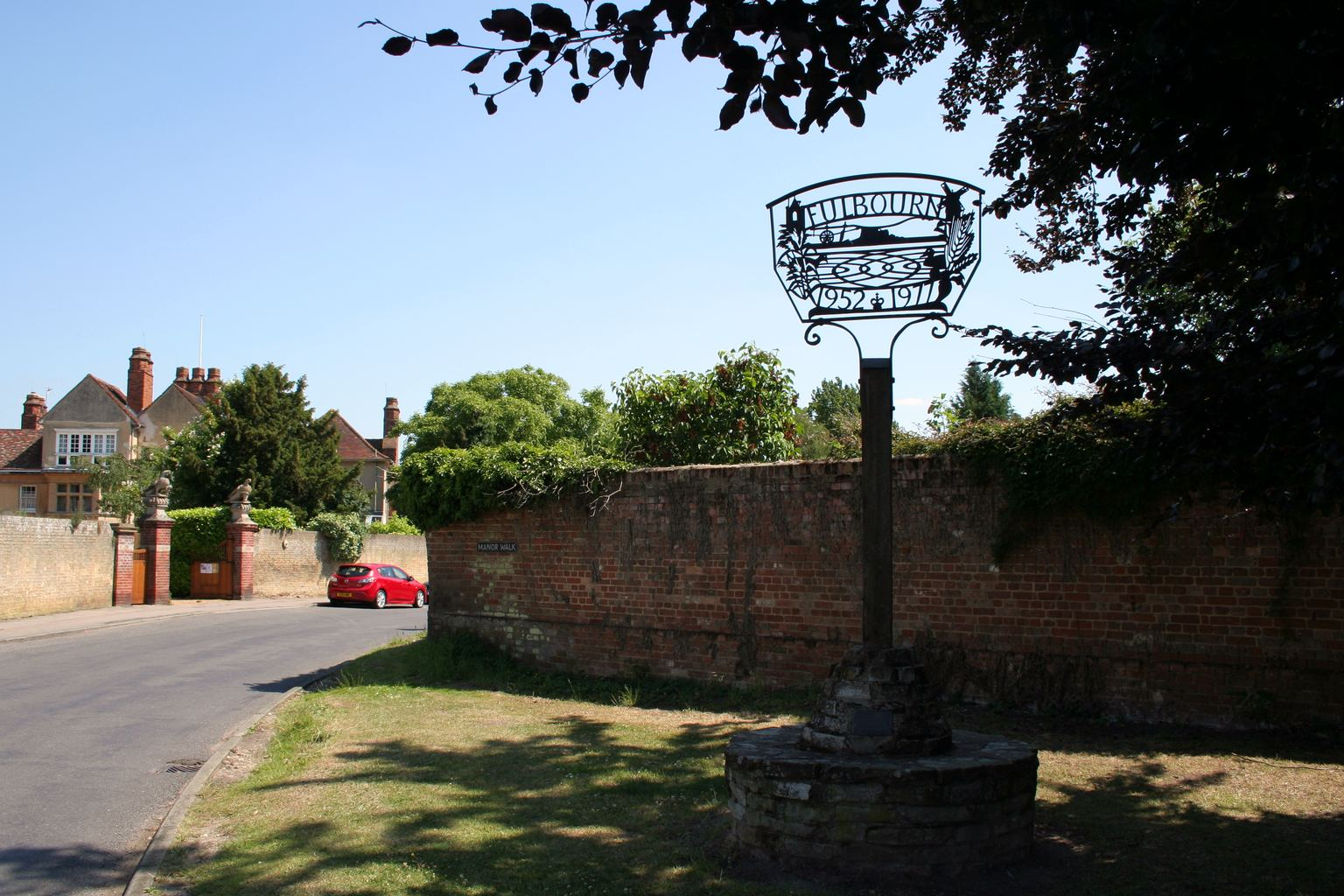
Fulbourn, present-day

== Bishop ==
Walter's first clerical appointment in Ireland was as Dean of Waterford in 1281. In 1283 he was consecrated Bishop of Meath, but due to a dispute with a rival candidate for the see, Thomas St Leger, he never exercised the functions of bishop. He was transferred to the bishopric of Waterford in 1286 and held the see until his death in December 1307.

== Lord Chancellor ==
In 1283 he became Lord Chancellor. Elrington Ball, while describing him as "a great person" admits that he was a failure in that office. Serious complaints were made about the heavy fees being charged to litigants in the Court of Chancery (Ireland), who also complained that there was only one clerk in the Chancery office, who was so ignorant that the writs he issued were useless. Probably as a result of these complaints Fulbourn stepped down as Lord Chancellor in 1288.

== Charged with corruption ==
In addition to his own alleged incompetence as Lord Chancellor, he was implicated in the accusations of corruption and inefficiency which were levelled at his brother Stephen in his capacity of Treasurer of Ireland, since Walter regularly acted as his Deputy. The accusations were considered sufficiently serious to prompt an official inquiry in 1284 into the actions of both brothers, the result of which was inconclusive. Numerous grievances were aired and various charges were levelled at them, including debasing of the coinage by the issue of the steeping, an inferior version of the standard silver penny (the steepings appear in fact to have been Dutch shillings), and despoiling Dublin Castle of its valuables, but neither brother was removed from office. Otway-Ruthven concludes that it is impossible to determine whether or not either Walter or Stephen was guilty of corruption. Many of the charges against them were made by Nicholas de Clere, (or le Clerk), Stephen's suçcessor as Treasurer, who was himself later accused of corruption, (probably instigated by Walter himself, or other Fulbourn relatives). De Clere was unable to prove his innocence, and died in prison.

Both brothers seem to have lived in a great state. Stephen at his death left a house positively stuffed with valuables, quite improper, his enemies said, in one who had taken a vow of poverty. Walter held substantial lands in several counties of Leinster, some of which he granted to Sir David de Offington, Baron of the Court of Exchequer (Ireland).
