= Francis Toppesfeld =

Francis Toppesfeld (died after 1427) was an English Crown servant who became a judge in Ireland.

He is first heard of in the reign of King Henry IV, when he was an esquire of the body, in personal attendance on the Royal Family. He was a senior official who held the position of Controller of the Household to King Henry's second son Thomas of Lancaster, Duke of Clarence. Clarence held office as Lord Lieutenant of Ireland in 1401-13 (arriving in Dublin in November 1401) and it is almost certain that Toppesfeld accompanied him to Ireland, as did another future Baron of the Exchequer, Sir John Radcliffe, then Lancaster's Secretary and later a distinguished military commander. Toppesfeld married Alice, an heiress who brought him a considerable landholding in Ireland. They were visiting England in 1410, having appointed Thomas Shorthalls, later another colleague of Toppesfeld on the Court of Exchequer, as their attorney.

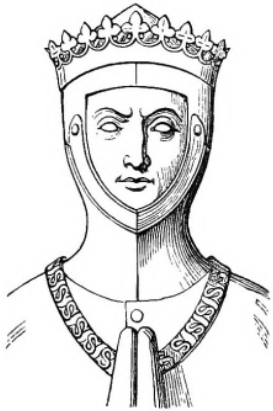
Thomas Duke of Clarence-effigy

Clarence, his employer, had left Ireland for good in 1409; he was killed fighting in France in 1421. In 1425, Toppesfeld was appointed a Baron of the Court of Exchequer (Ireland) at a salary of £20 a year. He was not necessarily a qualified lawyer, as this was not a requirement to be a Baron in the fifteenth century, a fact which gave rise to frequent complaints about the poor quality of the judges. He was still on the Bench in 1427 when, like so many judges of the time, he complained that his salary was in arrears. The Exchequer, having investigated his complaint, confirmed that he was due arrears of £6. Shortly afterwards he stepped down as a judge in favour of Robert Chambre. His date of death is not recorded.

== Sources ==
- Ball, F. Elrington The Judges in Ireland 1221-1921 London John Murray 1926
- Haydn, Joseph Book of Dignities London Longman Brown Green and Longmans 1851
- Otway-Ruthven, A.J. A History of Medieval Ireland New York Barnes and Noble 1993
- Smyth, Constantine Joseph Chronicle of the Law Officers of Ireland London Butterworths 1839
