= William de Meones =

English-born cleric and judge

William de Meones (died 1325) was an English-born cleric and judge in fourteenth-century Ireland, who was the second Chief Baron of the Irish Exchequer. Today he is chiefly remembered for giving his name to the Dublin suburb of Rathmines.

== Career ==
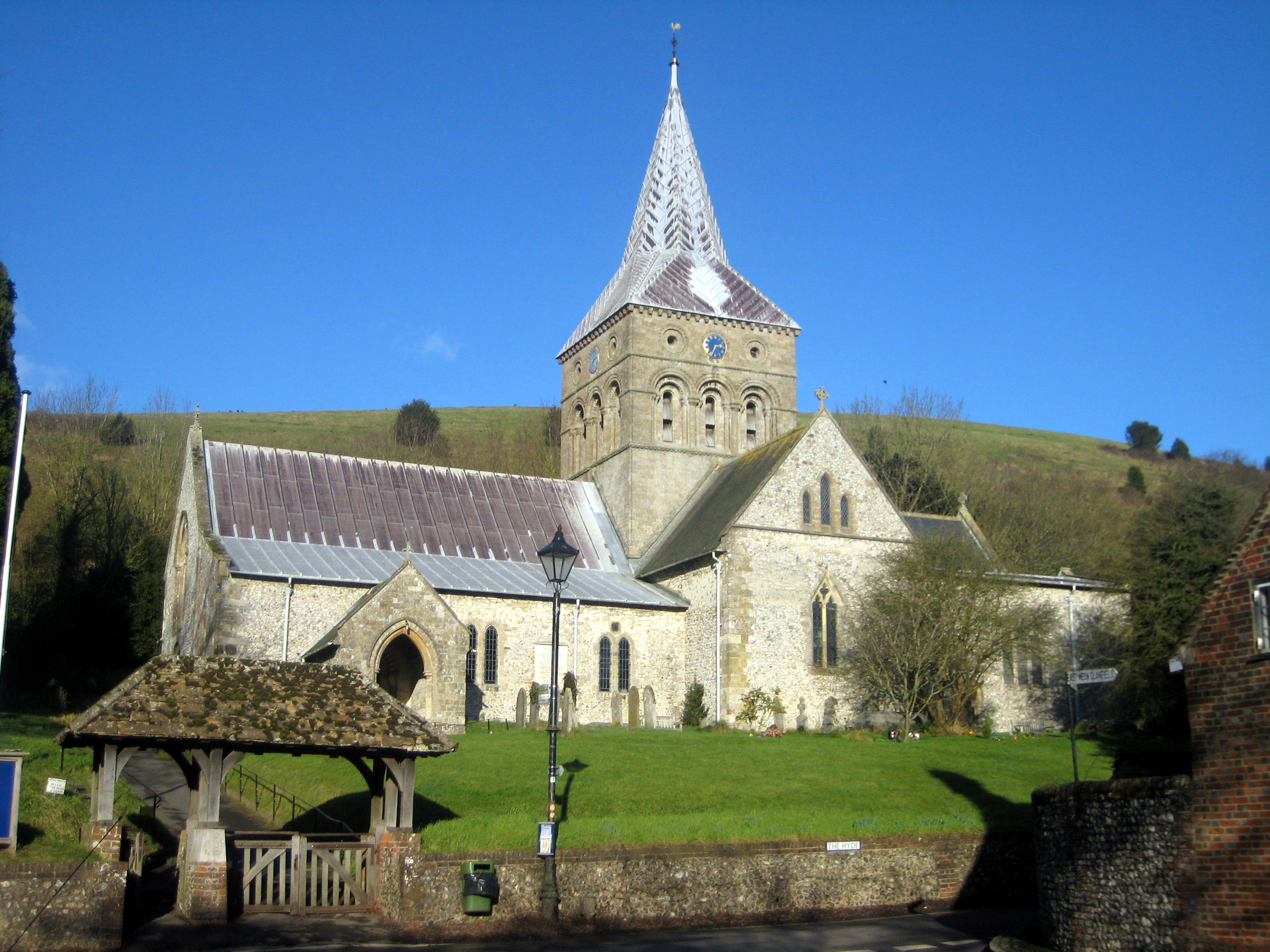
All Saints Church, East Meon: William de Meones was born in East Meon

He derived his name from his birthplace, the village of East Meon in Hampshire. He is first heard of in Ireland in about 1279 as a clerk in the entourage of John de Derlington, who was Archbishop of Dublin 1279-1284, but never took up the office, as he died in March 1284 on his journey to Ireland. Clearly, William was a key official in Derlington's entourage, since he was executor of his will. In his capacity as executor he defended a lawsuit brought against the Archbishop's estate by Thomas de Chaddesworth, Dean of St. Patrick's Cathedral: the plaintiff claimed sixty pounds compensation for a difficult and hazardous journey he had undertaken at the Archbishop's command. De Meones was also a canon of St. Patrick's Cathedral, Dublin. He was employed to collect Crown revenues in 1285 and was keeper of the Queen's forest at Glencree in the Wicklow Mountains in 1290 (this was the only royal forest in Ireland), and of the Queen's timber works there. In 1301-2 he was paying 8 pence rent on Crown lands at Newgrange, Dublin.

In 1293 he was Chamberlain of the Exchequer of Ireland and in 1299 he was appointed a Baron of the Court of Exchequer (Ireland); this is one of the first references to the Court of Exchequer, which did not then have a full-time staff, having been founded only about four years earlier. He was probably the replacement for Sir David de Offington, who apparently retired the same year. He resigned as Baron in 1308 but was reappointed the following year. He was acting as an official receiver in 1306. In 1307/8 he was collecting the King's debts in County Kilkenny. In 1311 he succeeded Walter de Islip as Chief Baron, but apparently reverted to the status of ordinary Baron in 1313. He died in 1325. His estates passed to a nephew, Gilbert de Meones, the first recorded owner of Meonesrath, and also a military man who was given the command of several forts in County Wicklow.

== Placename ==
It is widely accepted that the de Meones family gave its name to Rathmines, the Rath (Gaelic for ringfort) of de Meones; such a combination of Irish and Norman-French elements in a place-name was not uncommon in medieval Ireland. Elrington Ball, in support of the theory, notes that in the fourteenth century, the district was often referred to as Meonesrath. William's nephew and heir Gilbert was referred to as being "of Meonesrath", as was a second William de Meones, who was Lord of Meonesrath from about 1380 to the start of the fifteenth century.

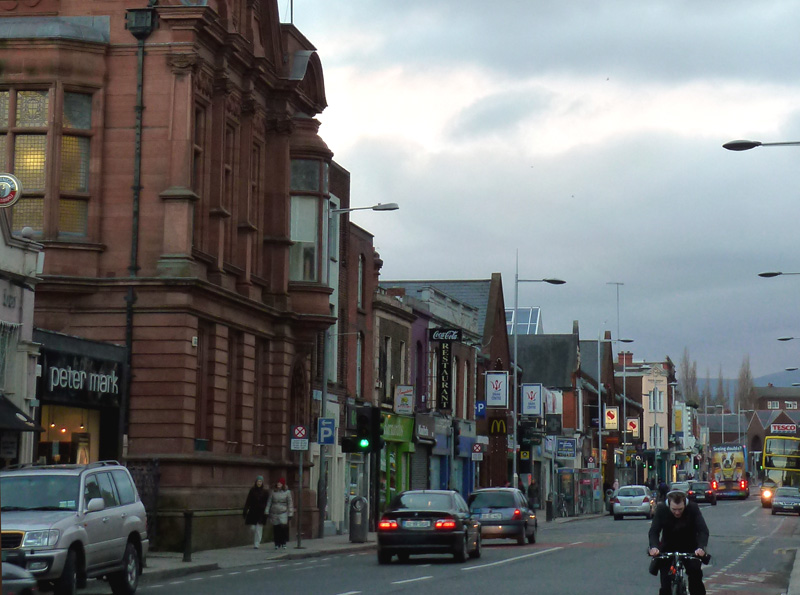
Rathmines today

== See also ==
- Rathmines
- Chief Baron of the Irish Exchequer
- De Meones family
- Nicholas de Meones
