= De Meones family =

Anglo-Irish family

The De Meones, or de Moenes family were an Anglo-Irish family who originated in East Meon in Hampshire. They moved to Ireland in the late thirteenth century, became substantial landowners in Dublin and Meath, and gave their name to the suburb of Rathmines.

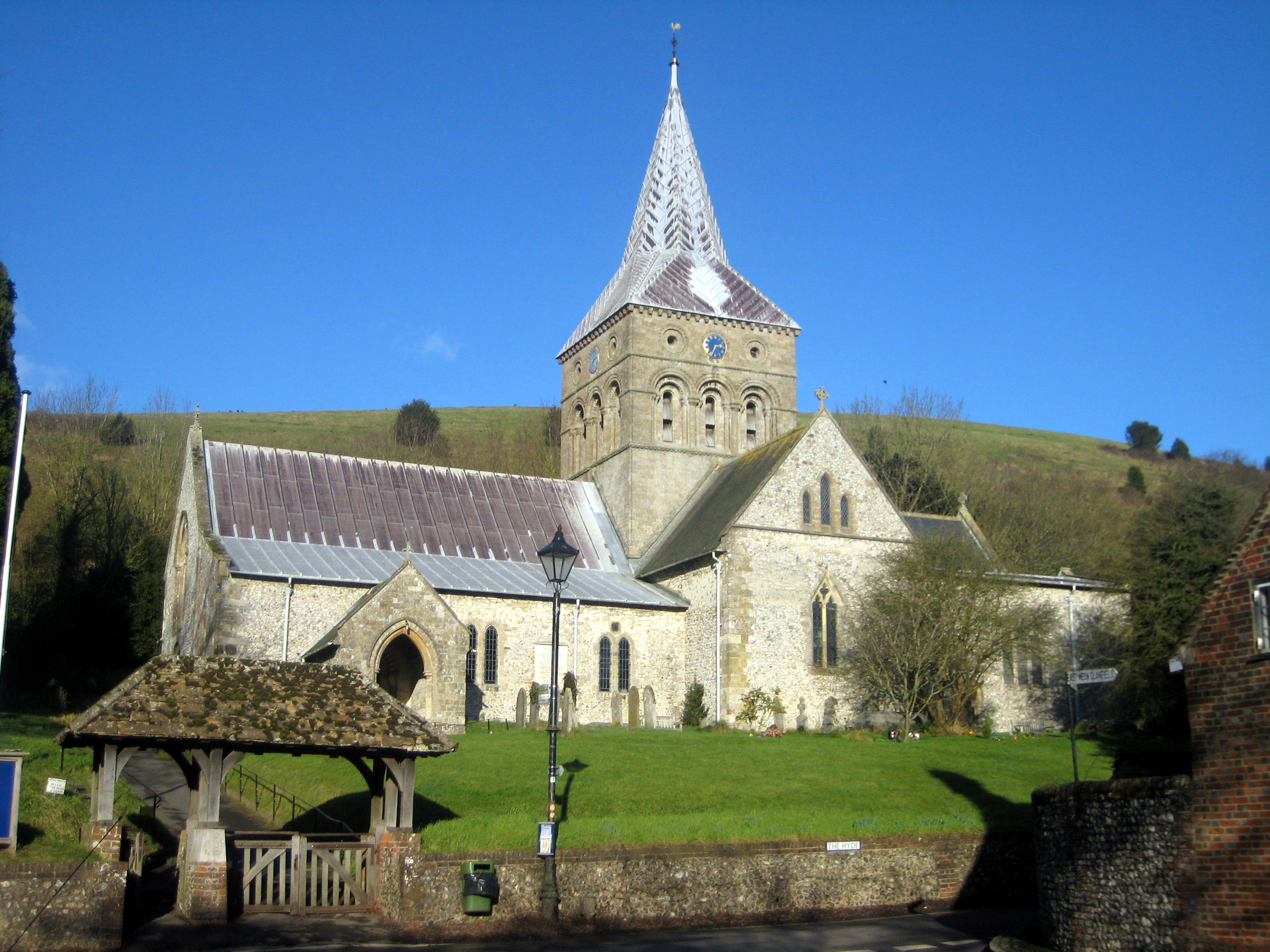
All Saints Church, East Meon: the de Meones family took their name from the village of East Meon

== Foundations ==
The family came from the village of East Meon in Hampshire.

William de Meones, the first family member to live in Ireland, came from England in 1279–80 as a clerk in the entourage of John de Derlington, Archbishop of Dublin. He acted as the Archbishop's executor following his death in 1284, and in that capacity he defended a lawsuit brought by Thomas de Chaddesworth, Dean of St Patrick's Cathedral, for expenses allegedly due to him.

He became Chief Baron of the Irish Exchequer in 1311. He was keeper of the royal forest of Glencree in the Wicklow Mountains. He acquired lands in the Manor of St. Sepulchre (in fact it consisted of several manors, comprising much of present-day Dublin city). His estates were known first as Meonesrath, and later as Rathmines i.e. the Rath (ringfort) of de Meones.

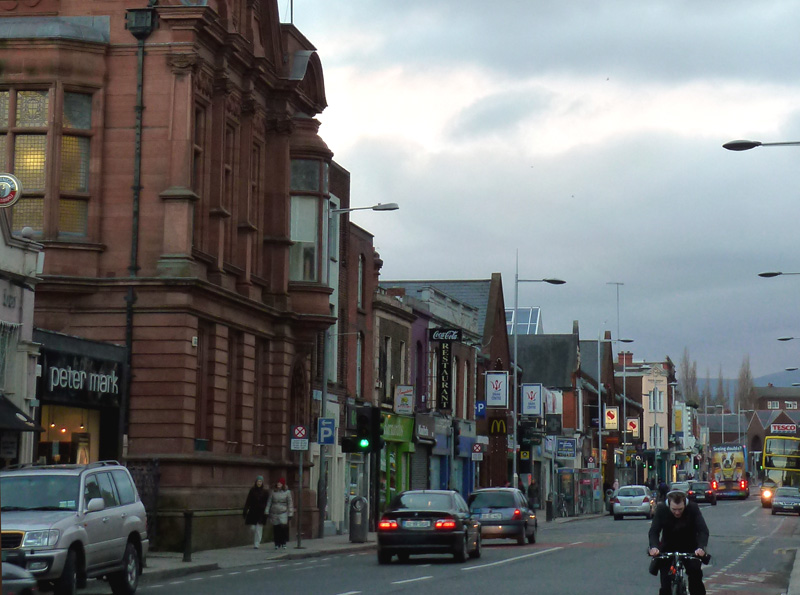
Rathmines, present day

== Second generation ==
William died in 1325: his property passed to his nephew, Gilbert de Meones, a professional soldier. He was Constable of the castles of Arklow, Newcastle Mackynegan and Powerscourt, and was a wealthy landowner. John de Meones was three times Lord Mayor of Dublin, in 1331-2, 1335-6 and 1337-8 and Robert de Meones, a brother of Gilbert, held the same office in 1351-2. The de Meones family intermarried with other leading Dublin city families, notably that of John Le Decer, four times Mayor of Dublin between 1302 and 1326. Le Decer was the maternal grandfather of John de Meones.

John's father, another Robert, was a man of considerable wealth, some of which probably came to him through his marriage to Elena Le Decer, John le Decer's daughter, as her father was a rich man, though he gave much of his money away in charitable works.

A John Meones of Ratoath was appointed Keeper of the Peace for County Meath in 1382. His son Robert Meones, also of Ratoath, living in 1407, was a Crown official. In 1407 he was instructed to arrest John Brygges, who had been indicted for several felonies, and to seize all his chattels.

== Nicholas de Meones and his heirs ==
Nicholas de Meones (died 1394), who was the son of Robert and nephew of Gilbert de Meones, was appointed a judge of the Court of King's Bench (Ireland) in 1374. During his somewhat turbulent career he was arrested for felony and treason and imprisoned in Dublin Castle in 1378, but soon freed. He was also a man of property, who bought three houses on Winetavern Street in Dublin city centre.

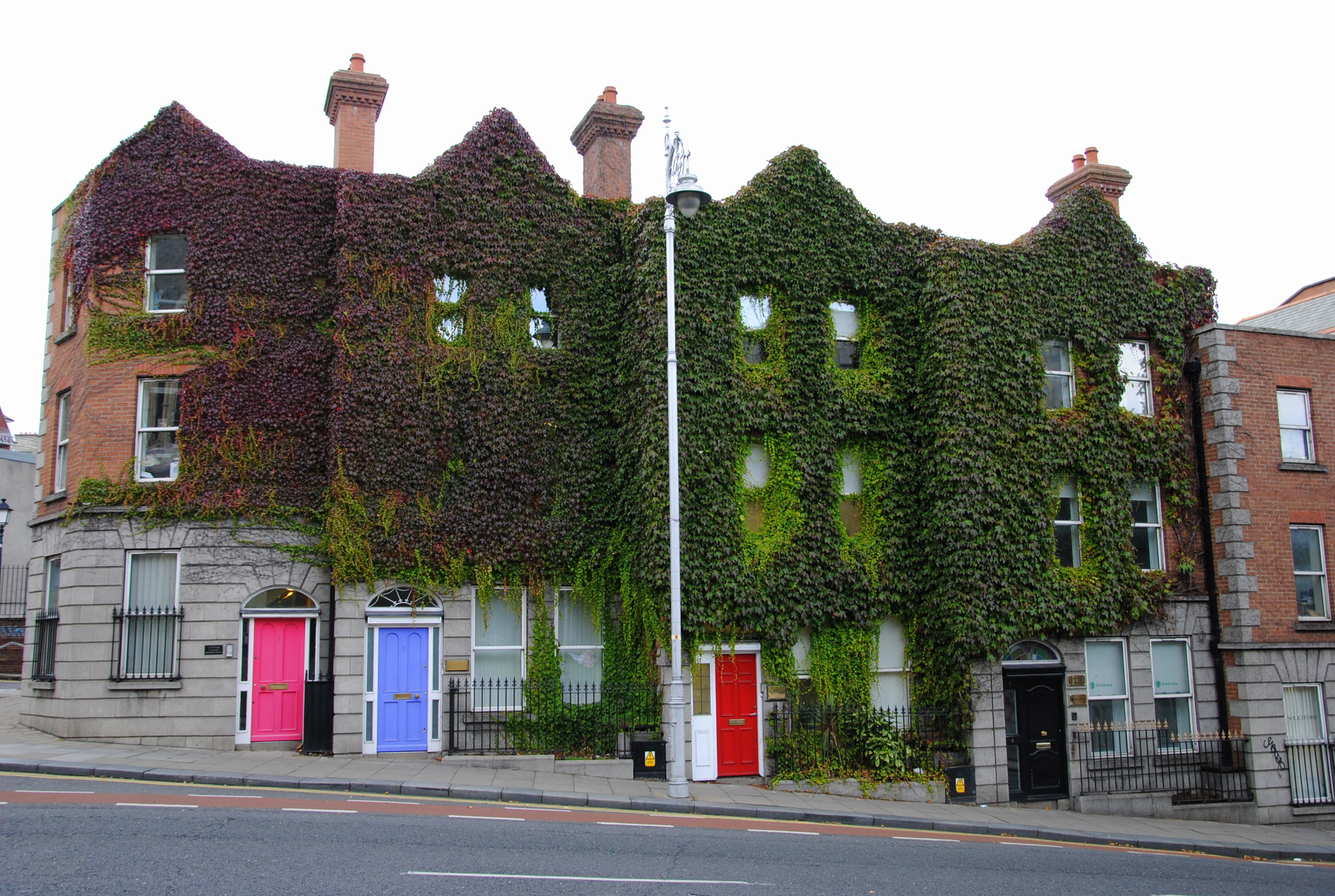
Winetavern Street, Dublin: the de Meones family owned three houses here in the late fourteenth century

In 1382 a second William de Meones was Lord of the manor of Meonesrath. He was still living in 1399. In 1394 he inherited the estate of his cousin Nicholas, the judge. The family also held lands at Harold's Cross and operated a watermill on the River Dodder, then the main source of Dublin's drinking water. They sold their houses on Winetavern Street in the 1390s to the wealthy Passevaunt family.

== Sixteenth century ==
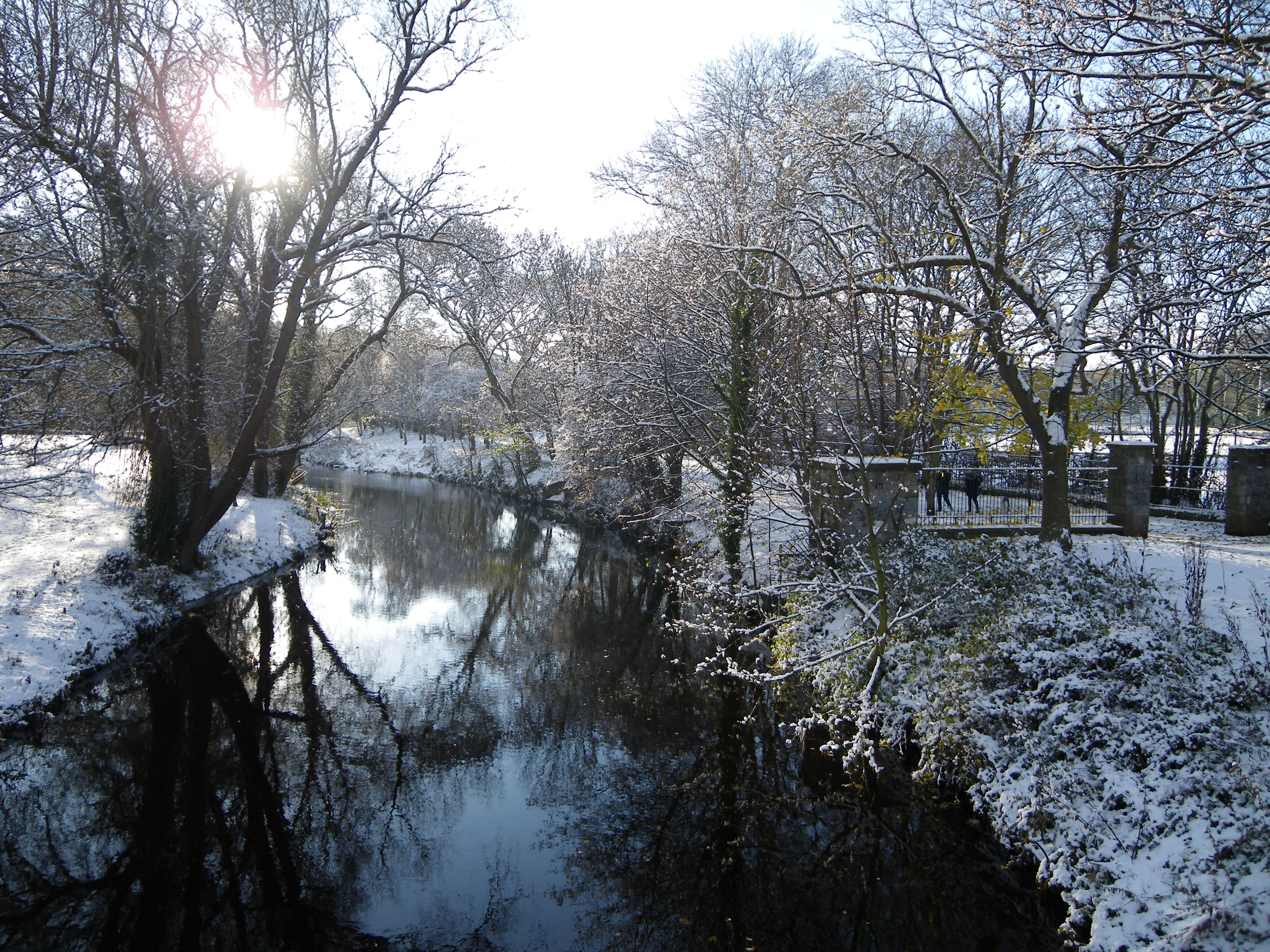
River Dodder, Rathgar: the de Meones family were local landowners

In the 1520s and 1530s, a third William de Meones was granted lands in South Dublin: at Cullenswood (now Ranelagh) "beyond the water of the River Dodder", and at Ticknock, in the foothills of the Dublin Mountains. Little is known of the family in later generations.

== See also ==
- Nicholas de Meones
- William de Meones
- John Le Decer
