= Thomas Shorthalls =

Mayor of Dublin, Ireland

Thomas Shortalls, or Shorthals (c.1370–1445) was an Irish municipal official and judge of the fifteenth century.

He was probably born in Kilkenny city, where the Shorthalls were a leading local family, but seems to have spent most of his adult life in Dublin. Robert Shorthalls, who was High Sheriff of County Kilkenny in 1421, was probably a relative. Robert, like Thomas, seems to have been a Crown servant of some importance: in 1425 the Privy Council ordered that he be paid 100 shillings for his services in the "wars and treaties".

Thomas is first heard of as clerk to the city of Dublin, and then became Sheriff of Dublin City (the title then was Bailiff) in 1406. He served two further terms as Sheriff, in 1414 and 1424. In 1410 "for his services" the English Crown granted him an allowance of 28 shillings a year for the next seven years to be paid out of the fee farm rents of Dublin. In the same year he was made Constable of the Dublin wool staple (the centralised system in the port of Dublin for regulation of the wool trade), jointly with Richard Bone. He was one of the MPs for Dublin City in 1420. He was Mayor of Dublin in 1420–21. In 1426 he was named as one of the founders of the Dublin Shoemakers Guild.

In 1431 he was appointed a Baron of the Court of Exchequer (Ireland), at a salary of 20 marks per annum. At the time this office did not necessarily require legal qualifications, and Irish Barons of the Exchequer in the fifteenth century were often criticised for their lack of learning. However Shorthalls had acted as attorney for his future colleague on the Court of Exchequer, Francis Toppesfeld (appointed a Baron in 1425) and his wife Alice during their stay in England in 1410, which suggests that he had at the least more legal knowledge than most Barons. He became second Baron in 1435. He stepped down briefly in 1438 when he was referred to as the "former Baron", and was replaced by Peter Clynton (or Clayton), but he was sitting as a Baron again by 1442. Clynton is known to have spent his later career as Collector of Customs for Dublin and Drogheda.

He was a member of the Privy Council of Ireland and was present at an important Council meeting in August 1442 where very serious accusations were made against the Lord Chancellor of Ireland, Richard Wogan, who was accordingly deemed to have vacated office, and was replaced by Sir Richard FitzEustace.

He apparently retired in 1443, when John Gough became second Baron of the Exchequer, and died two years later.

== Sources ==
- Ball, F. Elrington The Judges in Ireland 1221-1921 London John Murray 1926
- Graves, James and Prim, J.G.A. The History, Architecture and Antiquities of the Cathedral Church of St. Canice, Kilkenny Dublin Hodges Figgis 1857
- Haydn, Joseph The Book of Dignities London Longman Brown Green and Longmans 1851
- Smyth, Constantine Joseph Chronicle of the Law Officers of Ireland London Butterworths 1839
