= Richard de Soham =

English Crown official in Ireland

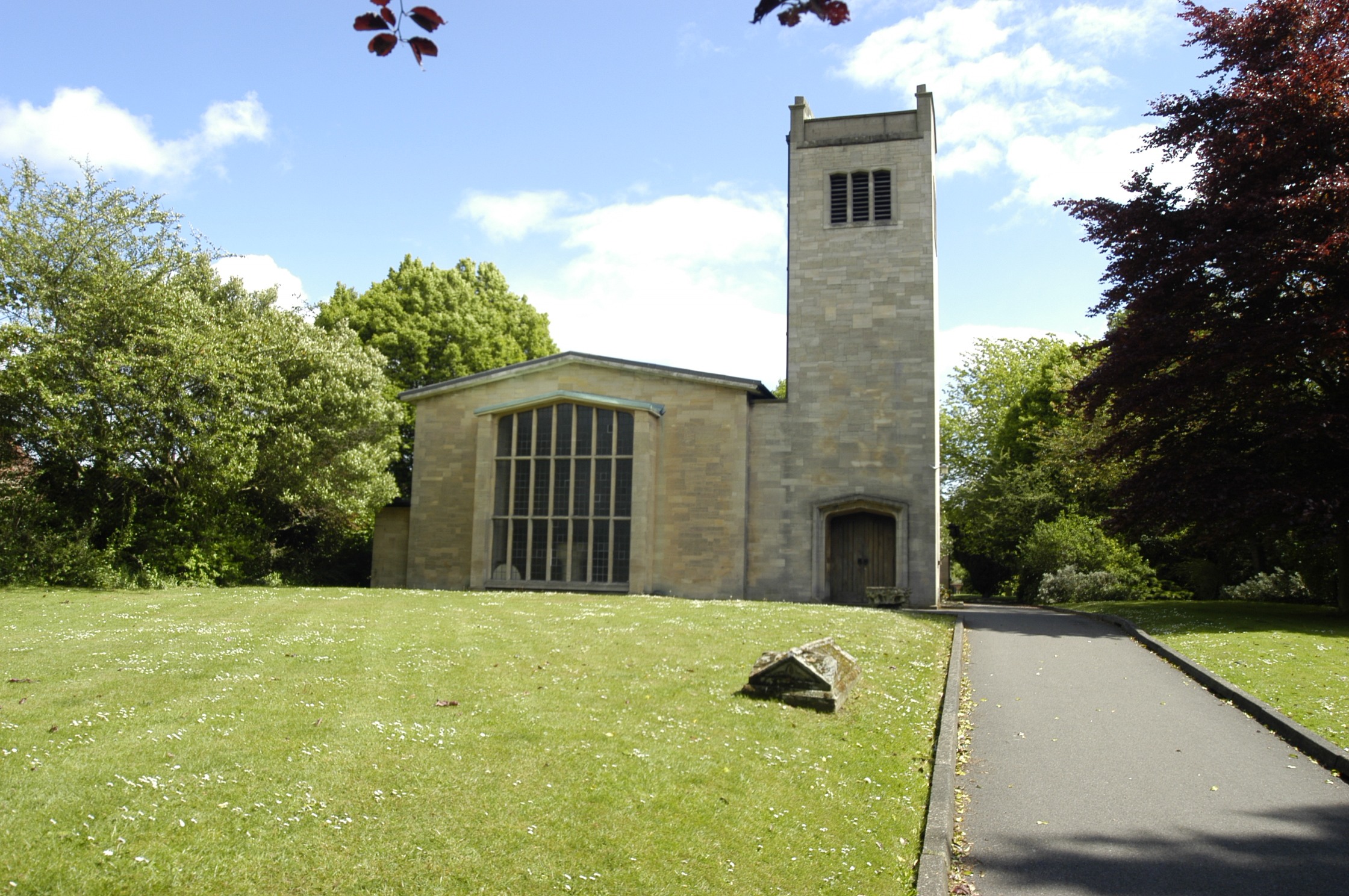
St. Michael's Church, Waddington, Lincolnshire: Soham was parish priest here in the early 1300s

Richard de Soham (died after 1305) was an English-born Crown official and judge who held high office in Ireland in the reign of King Edward I of England. He was a Baron of the Court of Exchequer (Ireland) and briefly Deputy Lord Treasurer of Ireland.

He was a native of Soham in Cambridgeshire, and took his name from the town. He is first heard of as a Crown official in 1286, as a tax collector in Yorkshire, charged with levying "the tenth": he was assistant to William de Beverley, a future Lord Chancellor of Ireland.

He was sent to Ireland for the first time in 1288 to survey the province of Leinster, and evidently settled in Ireland. After a brief return home in 1294, he came back to Ireland as a Baron of the recently founded Court of Exchequer in 1295. He was only the second judge appointed to the Court, joining Sir David de Offington (died 1312), another English-born official who had long been resident in Ireland. He served as Deputy Treasurer of Ireland in 1304, and retired from the Bench in 1305.

Like most judges of the time, he was in holy orders. He was appointed parish priest of Waddington, Lincolnshire in 1303, and presumably spent his last years there.

== Sources ==
- Ball, F. Elrington The Judges in Ireland 1221-1921. London: John Murray, 1926
