= William de Windsor =

English administrator who worked extensively in Ireland

Sir William de Windsor
- Baron Windsor
- Arms of Windsor: Gules, a saltire argent between twelve crosses crosslet or
- Born: c. 1325; Grayrigg, Westmorland
- Died: 15 September 1384 (aged 59–62); Haversham, Westmorland
- Spouse: Alice Perrers (m. 1376)
- Father: Sir Alexander de Windsor
- Mother: Elizabeth

Sir William de Windsor, Baron Windsor (c. 1325 – 1384) was an English administrator who served as King's Lieutenant in Ireland.

== Origins ==
William was the son of Sir Alexander de Windsor of Grayrigg, Westmorland, and of Elizabeth (died August 1349), his wife. No connection has been proved between this family and that of the Windsors of Stanwell. (Note: G. E. Cokayne's Complete Peerage, viii. 183–4; Sir G. F. Duckett, Duchetiana, gives a full account of the descent of the Windsor family. Cokayne gives the family name as Wyndesore; Duckett gives Windesore.) He was of full age in 1349, and served in the French wars of Edward III.

== Ireland ==
Before 1369, Windsor had held a command in Ireland under Lionel of Antwerp, and claimed lands in Kinsale, Inchiquin, and Youghal. (Note: King's Council in Ireland, p. 326.) In that year he was appointed the King's Lieutenant in Ireland, and had a grant of a thousand marks a year. (Note: Dugdale, Baronage, i. 509.) He at once set to work to reduce the Dublin border clans, but in 1370 had to leave them in order to attempt the rescue of the Earl of Desmond, who had been taken prisoner by the O'Briens. (Note: Gilbert, Viceroys of Ireland, p. 230.)

To secure even partial order Windsor had been compelled to adopt measures of doubtful legality; at a parliament of 1369, failing to induce its members to promise new customs to the King, he extorted from the prelates, who met separately, a grant for three years, and afterwards had enrolment made in the chancery records that they were given in perpetuity to the Crown. The colonists appealed to Edward III, and, in answer to their petition, the King, on 10 September 1371, forbade Windsor, who had returned to England in March, to levy the sums for which he had exacted grants, ordered the enrolment to be erased, and on 20 October formally rebuked him for his extortions, which he bade him make good. (Note: Fœdera, vol. iii. pt. ii. pp. 922, 924, 928, 942.)

The mayor of Drogheda, arrested by Windsor's command, was released, (Note: Fœdera, vol. iii. pt. ii. p. 930.) and on 20 March 1373, an inquisition was held at Drogheda into Windsor's extortions in Meath and Uriel. (Note: Fœdera, vol. iii. pt. ii. pp. 977, 978, 979.) Alice Perrers, who afterwards became Windsor's wife, (Note: Chron. Angliæ, p. 97.) had in 1369, when he first became Viceroy, received from him the amount destined for the expenses of his expedition and the payment of his men.

On Windsor's withdrawal from Ireland, anarchy broke out. Accordingly, on 20 September 1373 Edward reappointed him to the Viceroyalty. (Note: Fœdera, vol. iii. pt. ii. p. 990.) He was commanded to levy the grants formerly promised at Baldoyle and Kilkenny, and to cooperate with Sir Nicholas Dagworth. (Note: cf. Alice Perrers)

In 1374, on the refusal of a parliament at Kilkenny to make a grant at Dagworth's request, Windsor issued writs bidding clergy and laity to elect representatives, finance them, and send them to England to consult Edward on an aid to be taken from Ireland. (Note: cf. Milo Sweetman) Meanwhile Newcastle, on the frontier of Wicklow, was taken by the Irish. The government sent help by sea to the garrison in the castle of Wicklow, but the council, meeting at Naas, forbade Windsor to move further south because it left the north in peril. Windsor could carry on the war only by levying forced subsidies of money and provisions.

== England ==
Early in 1376 Windsor gave up his Viceroyalty, and was summoned to England to consult with the King. On 29 September 1376 he was granted 100l. a year for life from the issues of the county of York. On 14 December, a pardon was granted him "for having harboured Alice Perrers, who was banished in 1377, and license granted for her to remain in the realm as long as she and her husband please".

On 23 October 1379, Sir John Harleston was directed to deliver up to Windsor the custody of Cherbourg. (Note: Walsingham, Hist. Angl. i. 427; Chron. Angliæ, p. 255; Fœdera, iv. 73.) In the same year Windsor was sent on the expedition to help the Duke of Brittany against France, (Note: Walsingham, Hist. Angl. i. 134.) receiving large grants of land, most of which had been forfeited by Alice Perrers. (Note: Dugdale, Baronage, i. 509; Cal. Pat. Rolls, 1377–81, p. 503; Rot. Parl. iii. 130 a.)

In 1381–2, 1382–3, 1383–4, Windsor had summons to parliament as a baron. (Note: Dugdale, i. 509.) In 1381 and 1382 he took a leading part in putting down the Peasants' Revolt, especially in the counties of Cambridge and Huntingdon, being granted special authority with this object, and made a special justice and commissary of the peace in Cambridge. On 13 March 1383, he was referred to as a "banneret". Further grants, previously made to Alice Perrers, were in 1381, 1383, and 1384 extended to him.

== Death ==
Windsor died at Haversham in Westmorland on 15 September 1384, heavily in debt to the Crown. The barony became extinct. His will was dated Haversham, 15 September, and proved on 12 October 1384. He left no legitimate issue. His nephew, John de Windsor, who was one of his executors, seized most of his estates, and had many disputes with his widow. He left certain lands to William of Wykeham, which the bishop eventually appropriated for the use of his great foundation at Winchester. (Note: Cal. Pat. Rolls, 1381–2, p. 577.) In Ireland John de Windsor did not succeed in obtaining his uncle's lands; for William's estates in Waterford were adjudged to his two sisters—Christiana, wife of Sir William de Moriers of Elvington, Yorkshire; and Margaret, wife of John Duket, "his nearest heirs and of full age". (Note: King's Council in Ireland, p. 326.)

== See also ==
- Nicholas de Meones
- John Cruys

== Sources ==
- Chronicon Angliæ, 1328–88;
- Sir G. F. Duckett's Duchetiana;
- Notes and Queries, 7th ser. vols. vii. and viii., especially vii. 449–51, by "Hermentrude", where a number of valuable notes from unpublished documents are collected;
- Moberly's Life of Wykeham, pp. 113–14, 121;
- Morant's History of Essex, i. 107;
- Rolls of Parliament;
- Sharpe's Calendar of Wills in the Court of Husting, ii. 202, 301;
- Walsingham's Gesta Abbatum S. Albani and Ypodigma Neustriæ (Rolls Series).
