= William de Beverley =

English Crown official and judge

William de Beverley, Le Buerlaco, or de Burlaco (died 1289 or 1292) was a senior English Crown official and judge of the reign of King Edward I of England. He held high public office, and spent his last years in Ireland as Lord Chancellor of Ireland.

The most usual version of his surname suggests that he was a native of Beverley in Yorkshire, a county with which he had a professional connection.

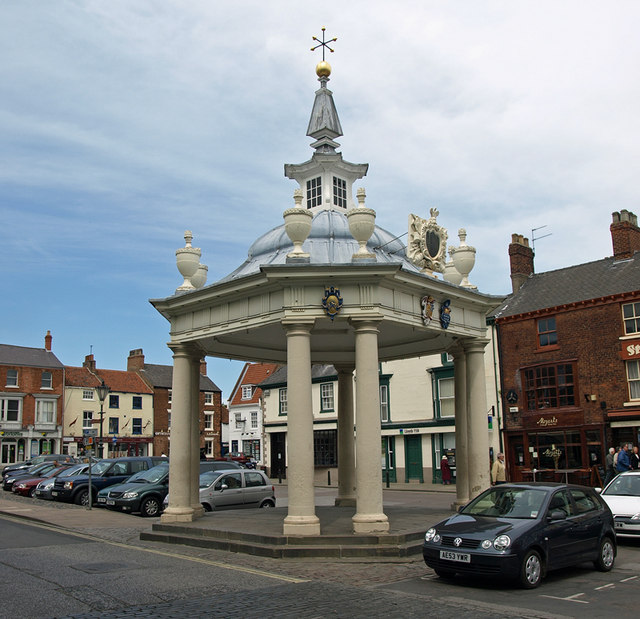
Beverley, Yorkshire

He sat on a royal commission to inquire into knights' service in three counties in 1279. He was a royal tax collector and receiver in Yorkshire in 1283–5, charged with levying "the tenth" (one-tenth of the value of movable goods): Richard de Soham, another future Irish judge, acted as his assistant. In 1286 King Edward sent him to Ireland to deal with unspecified "special affairs" there. He was appointed Lord Chancellor in 1288. Ball gives his date of death as 1289, and this is borne out by legal proceedings that year, which refer to "William de Beverlaco, deceased". Some sources however give his date of death as 1292. In 1288 or 1289 King Edward I sent him an order in his capacity as Chancellor to publish all Acts of Parliament.

Our few personal glimpses of him come from his letters to his English opposite number, Robert Burnell, Lord Chancellor of England, who was a friend of his.

From Court records we know that he was the legal guardian of a female relative, Margery de Anlatheby or de Anlauby, a woman of some wealth, who was adjudged to be insane. Margery was a widow with four children, and apparently became insane after her husband's death in 1279. Although her father was still alive in 1289, William had custody of her person and lands until his death.

== Sources ==
- Ball, F. Elrington The Judges in Ireland 1221–1921 London John Murray 1926
- Buhrer, Eliza Mental Competency Inquisitions from Medieval England (ca. late 12th c.-early 15th c.) Published in Medieval Disability Sourcebook: Western Europe Cormac McNabb, ed. Punctum Books 2020
- Haydn, Joseph Book of Dignities London Longman Green Brown and Longmans 1851
- Inquisitions Post Mortem, Edward 1, File 54
- O'Flanagan, J. Roderick Lives of the Lord Chancellors and Keepers of the Great Seal of Ireland London 2 volumes 1870
