= Nicholas de Meones =

Irish judge (died 1394)

Nicholas de Meones or de Moenes (died 1394) was an Irish judge of the fourteenth century. He had a somewhat turbulent career, due to his political partisanship, and was briefly imprisoned on a charge of treason.

== Life ==
He was born in Dublin, the son of Robert de Meones, Mayor of Dublin in 1351–2, and nephew of Gilbert de Meones, a prominent landowner who gave his name to Meonesrath, now Rathmines, a suburb of South Dublin. Gilbert was also a military man, who was Constable of several castles in County Wicklow, including Arklow. The De Meones family had come to Ireland from the village of East Meon in Hampshire in 1279 or 1280, acquired substantial properties in County Dublin, and intermarried with other prominent Dublin families like the Le Decers.

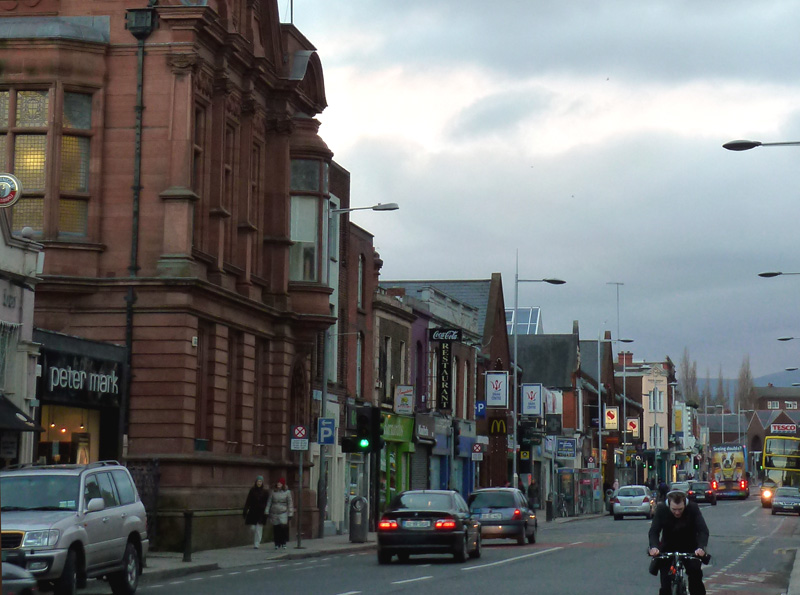
Rathmines, Dublin, present day: Nicholas' family gave their name to the suburb

Nicholas went to England in 1365, but returned to Ireland a few years later. He was a qualified lawyer, following in the footsteps of William de Meones, the first of the family to settle in Ireland, who was Chief Baron of the Irish Exchequer c.1311-13. Nicholas was appointed second justice of the Court of King's Bench (Ireland) in 1374. In December of that year the Privy Council of Ireland ordered that the arrears of salary due to him for sitting in the previous September, a sum of 4 marks, be paid. He acted as judge of gaol delivery in 1375–6, and received a lump-sum payment of £5 for his judicial services in that regard.

== Disgrace ==
He is said to have been personally unpopular in Dublin, due to his passion for self-aggrandisement. In the 1370s he bought three houses on Winetavern Street in Dublin city centre, which was seen as an act of undue ostentation.

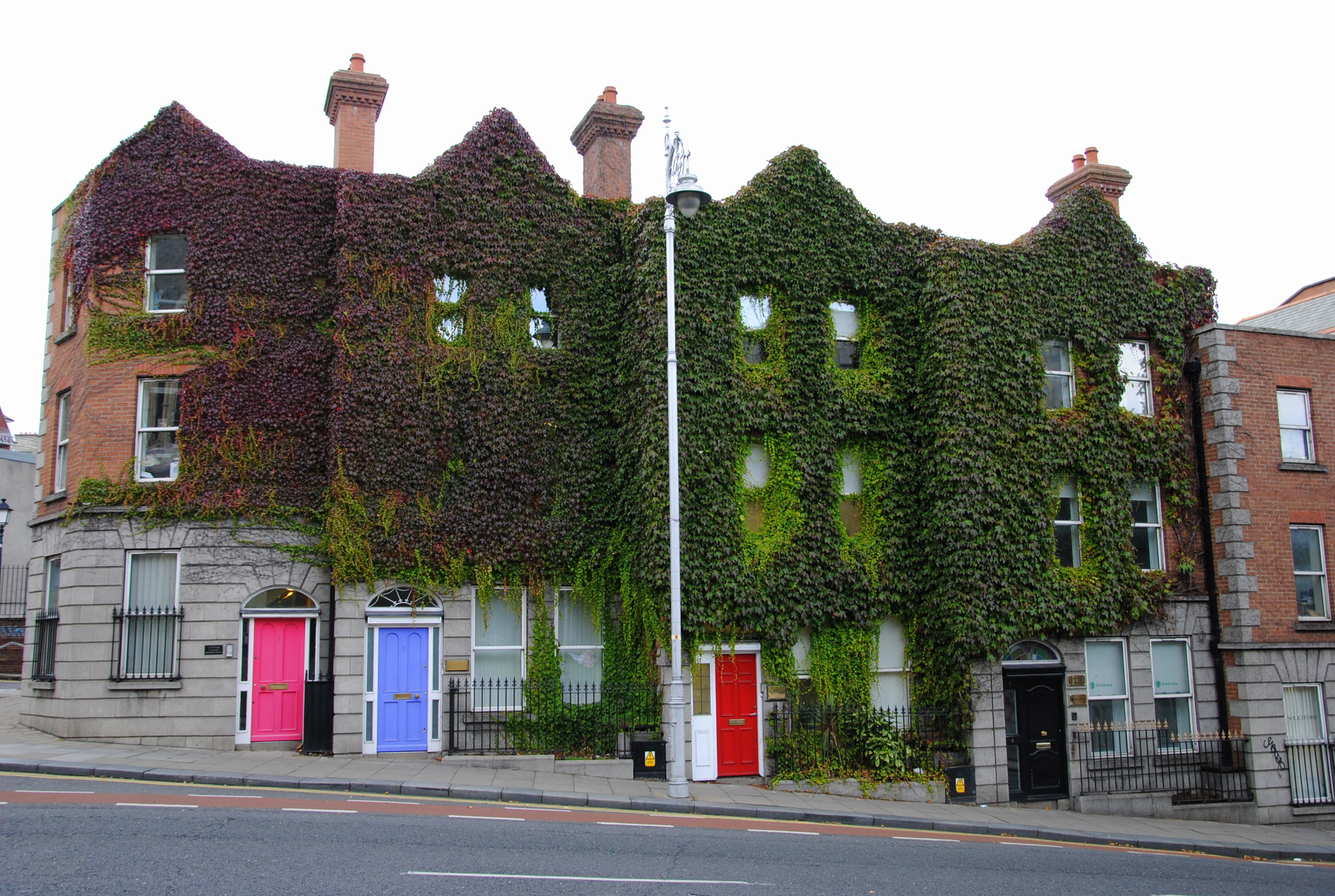
Winetavern Street, Dublin, present day: Nicholas owned three houses on the Street

He was known as a strong supporter of Sir William de Windsor, the high-handed and embattled Lord Lieutenant of Ireland, who held office from 1369 to 1376. His support for Windsor led to his temporary downfall in 1378, following Windsor's recall, when the English Crown sent a special representative, Sir Nicholas Dagworth, to assume temporary control of the Irish Government, and inquire into Windsor's alleged maladministration. Nicholas de Meones was quickly identified as an adherent of Windsor, and this combined with his personal unpopularity resulted in a flood of complaints being made against him, most of them probably malicious. He was accused of numerous felonies, and also, curiously, of treason, and was imprisoned in Dublin Castle.

Though Windsor had been recalled to England, Nicholas still had a powerful friend in the formidable and combative Robert Wikeford, Archbishop of Dublin and Lord Chancellor of Ireland, who was also on bad terms with the Dublin government. Wikeford, using his authority as Chancellor, had Nicholas released from the Castle. This action allegedly caused a riot in which one man, Richard Dere, was killed.

== Death ==
No further action seems to have been taken against Nicholas. He died early in 1394. He had no son and his property passed to a cousin, William de Meones, presumably the same William who was referred to as Lord of Meonesrath in 1382, in 1399. The Winetavern Street properties were quickly sold to another well-to-do Dublin family, the Passevaunts. John Passavaunt was appointed Clerk of the Crown and Hanaper in 1410.

== Sources ==
- Ball, F. Elrington The Judges in Ireland 1221-1921 London John Murray 1926
- Crooks, Peter Negotiating in a colonial capital-Dublin and the Windsor Crisis 1369/78 Medieval Dublin IX (2009)
- Smyth, Constantine Joseph Chronicle of the Law Officers of Ireland London Butterworths 1839
