= Winetavern Street =

Street in Dublin, Ireland

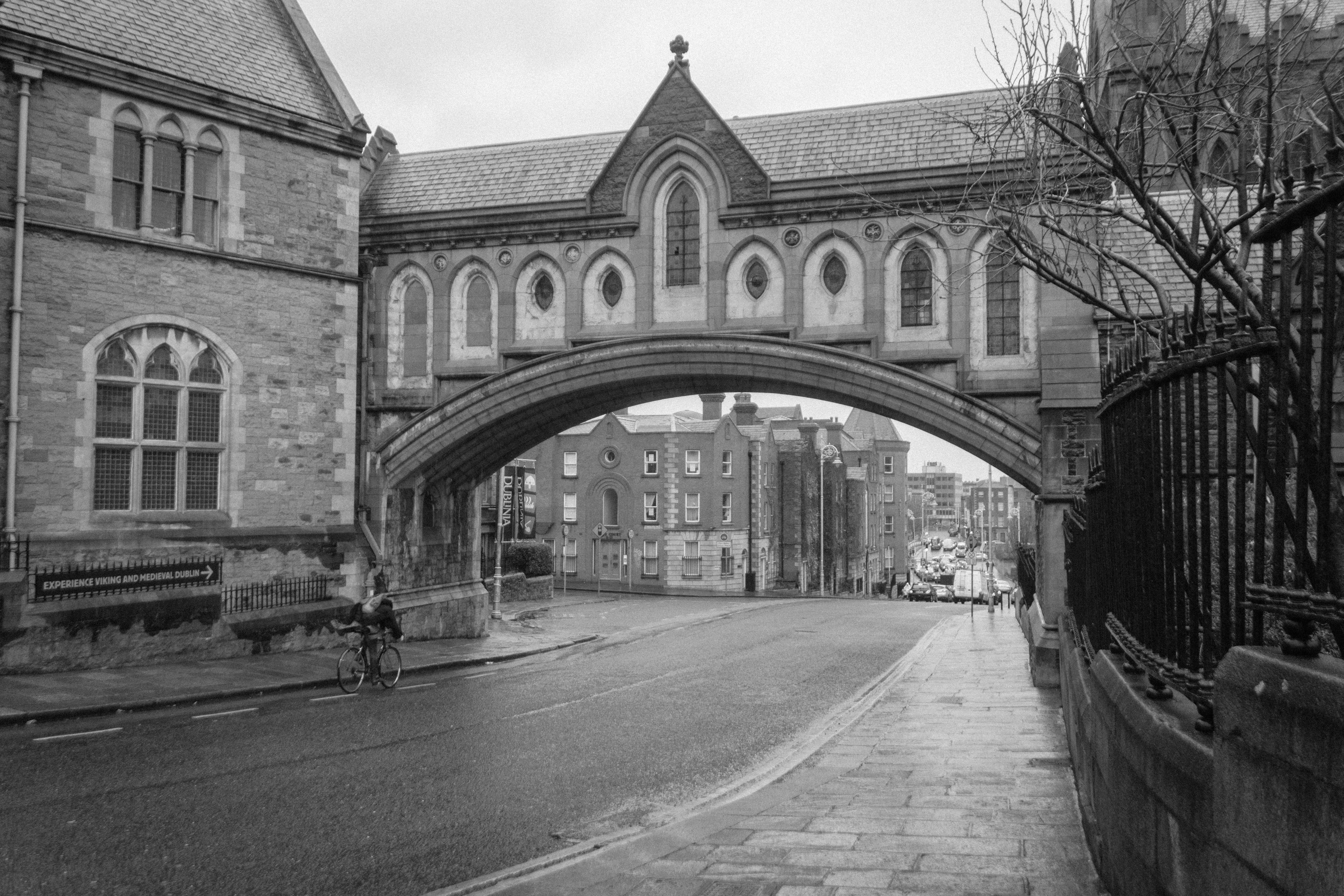
- Bridge over Winetavern Street, connecting Christ Church Cathedral to its former synod hall

- Location within Central Dublin
- Native name: Sráid an Fhíona (Irish)
- Former names: Wine-street, vicus tabernariorum vini
- Namesake: Wine taverns that were once common on the street
- Length: 210 m (690 ft)
- Width: 19 metres (62 ft)
- Location: Dublin, Ireland
- Postal code: D02
- Coordinates: 53.34403°N 6.27181°W
- north end: Merchant's Quay, Wood Quay, O'Donovan Rossa Bridge
- south end: High Street, Christchurch Place

Construction
- Construction start: 11th century

Other
- Known for: Medieval history, Dublinia, Christ Church Cathedral

Winetavern Street (Irish: Sráid an Fhíona) is a street in the medieval area of Dublin, Ireland.

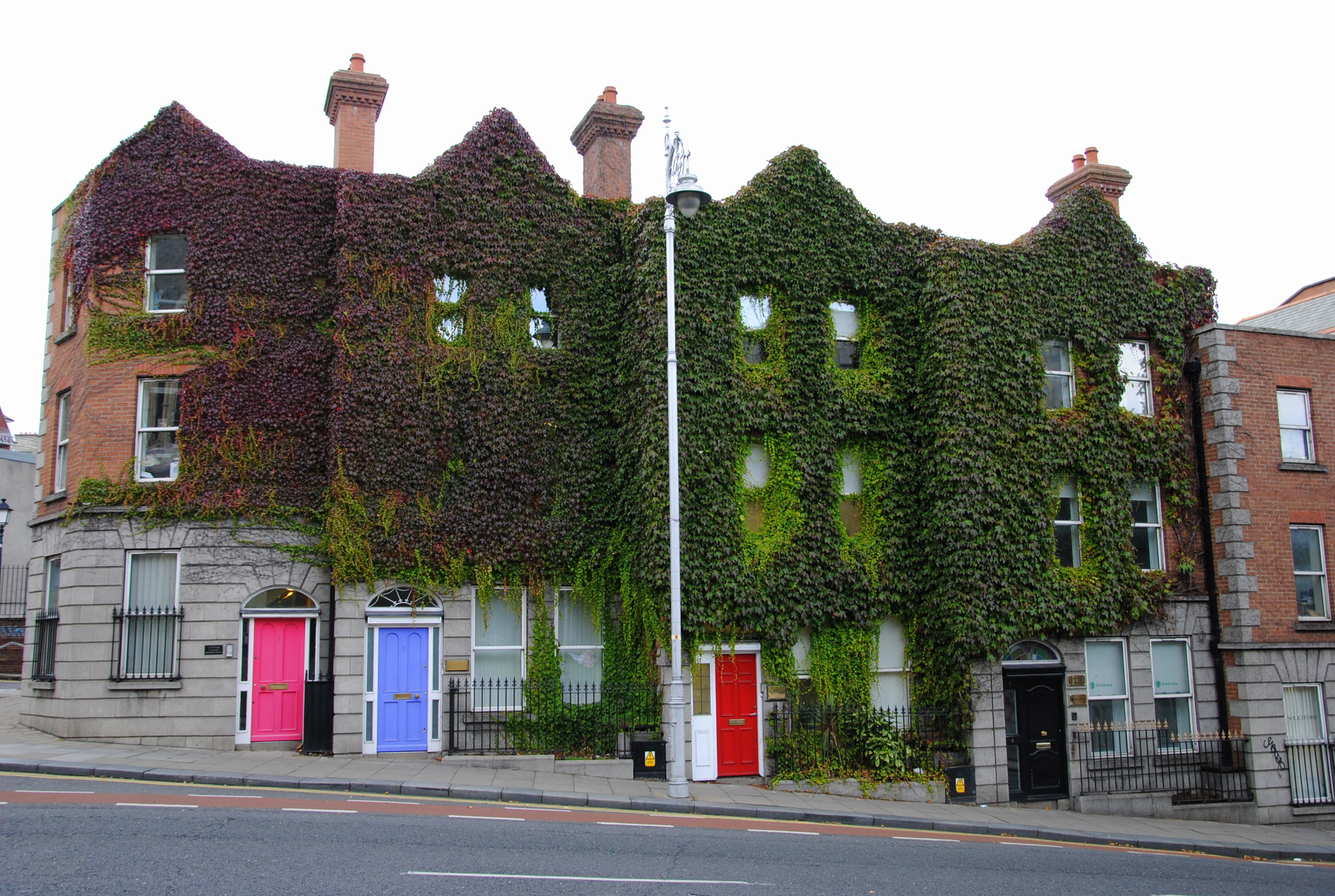
Buildings on Winetavern Street

== Location ==
Winetavern Street runs from High Street northwards and down to the quays, passing Christ Church Cathedral on its east side, in the heart of Medieval Dublin.

== History ==
Winetavern Street takes its name from the many wine shops and taverns that were located in the area from the 11th century onward. Winetavern Street ran from the city quays up to the medieval city centre and was thus an ideal site for selling alcohol and food to sailors and other visitors. Tavern tokens from the 11th and 12th centuries were found on archaeological digs in the area. In Anglo-Norman documents, the area is known by the Latin vicus tabernariorum vini, "street of the wine-taverners" or Taverners' Street. In the late 12th century, the Merchants' Guild Hall was established on the street. The tailors also had their guildhall on Winetavern Street before moving to Tailors' Hall on Back Lane in 1583. In the 1370s the senior judge Nicholas de Meones (whose family gave their name to nearby Rathmines) is recorded as buying three houses on the Street. Rathbornes Candles were founded on Winetavern Street in 1488, supplying candles to Christ Church.

On 13 March 1597, a large quantity of gunpowder was accidentally exploded in the street (then also known as Wine-street), causing many deaths and the destruction of several buildings, in an incident known as the Dublin gunpowder explosion. In the 17th century, taverns included The White Horse, the Golden Lyon, the King's Head, the Common Cellar, the Black Boy's Cellar, the Spread Eagle and the Golden Dragon.

From the 18th century onwards Dublin's core moved eastwards and the area declined. In the 19th century, the street was redeveloped by the Wide Streets Commission, and several fine houses were built; they later decayed into tenements. Dublin Fire Brigade has its first station on Winetavern Street in 1862.

The street was excavated by archaeologists in 1969–73; finds included wooden bowls, platters and barrel staves, some unfinished, suggesting the presence of wood-turners and coopers. Also found were sketches of ships on wood and scale models of ships, an early eleventh-century post and wattle building, a bronze Anglo-Norman strap-tag, a decorated Viking needle case, a large double-sided decorated comb, fragments of amber, a clay crucible, bone combs, bronze pins, a brooch similar to Norse examples form Birka and Hedeby, iron nails, fish-hooks, needles, bronze and gold wire, coins, potsherds of Ham Green Pottery and Bordeaux ware and glass, illustrating the street's links with Viking Dublin and Anglo-Norman Dublin.

In September 1978, 20,000 people protested on the street against the building of the Dublin City Council offices on the Wood Quay historic site, but were unsuccessful.

Today, Winetavern Street houses the headquarters of the Association of Secondary Teachers, Ireland (ASTI).

== Cultural references ==
Winetavern Street appears in the work of James Joyce:

Perhaps she would not hear at once: she would be undressing. Then something in his voice would strike her. She would turn and look at him.... At the corner of Winetavern Street they met a cab. He was glad of its rattling noise as it saved him from conversation. She was looking out of the window and seemed tired. The others spoke only a few words, pointing out some building or street. The horse galloped along wearily under the murky morning sky, dragging his old rattling box after his heels, and Gabriel was again in a cab with her, galloping to catch the boat, galloping to their honeymoon.

— "The Dead" (Dubliners)

Corley at the first go-off was inclined to suspect it was something to do with Stephen being fired out of his digs for bringing in a bloody tart off the street. There was a dosshouse in Marlborough street, Mrs Maloney’s, but it was only a tanner touch and full of undesirables but M’Conachie told him you got a decent enough do in the Brazen Head over in Winetavern street (which was distantly suggestive to the person addressed of friar Bacon) for a bob. He was starving too though he hadn’t said a word about it.

— Ulysses

== See also ==
- List of streets and squares in Dublin
