= Waddington, Lincolnshire =

Village and civil parish in Lincolnshire, England

Coordinates: 53.165870°N 0.541368°W

Waddington
- Village and civil parish
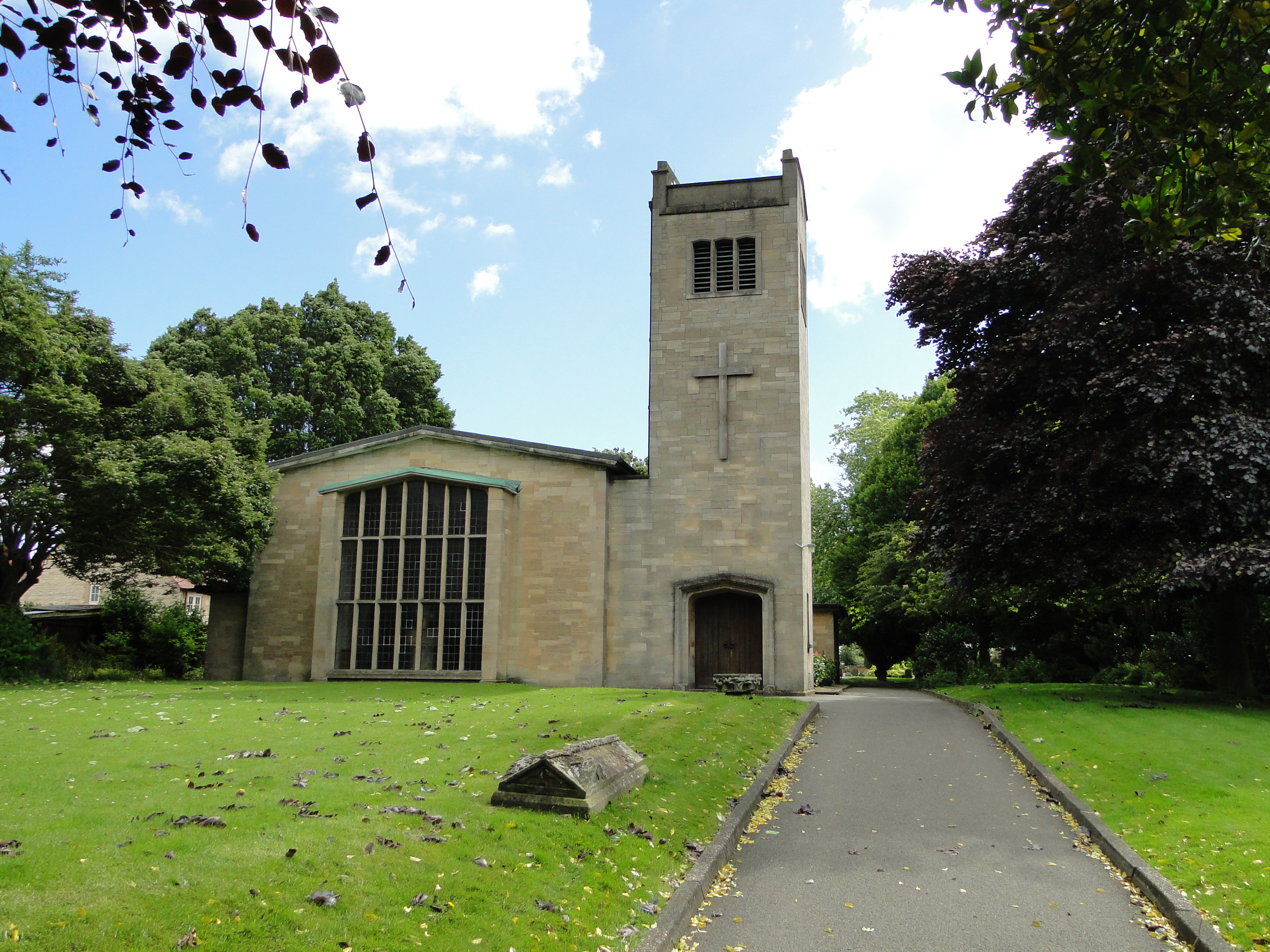
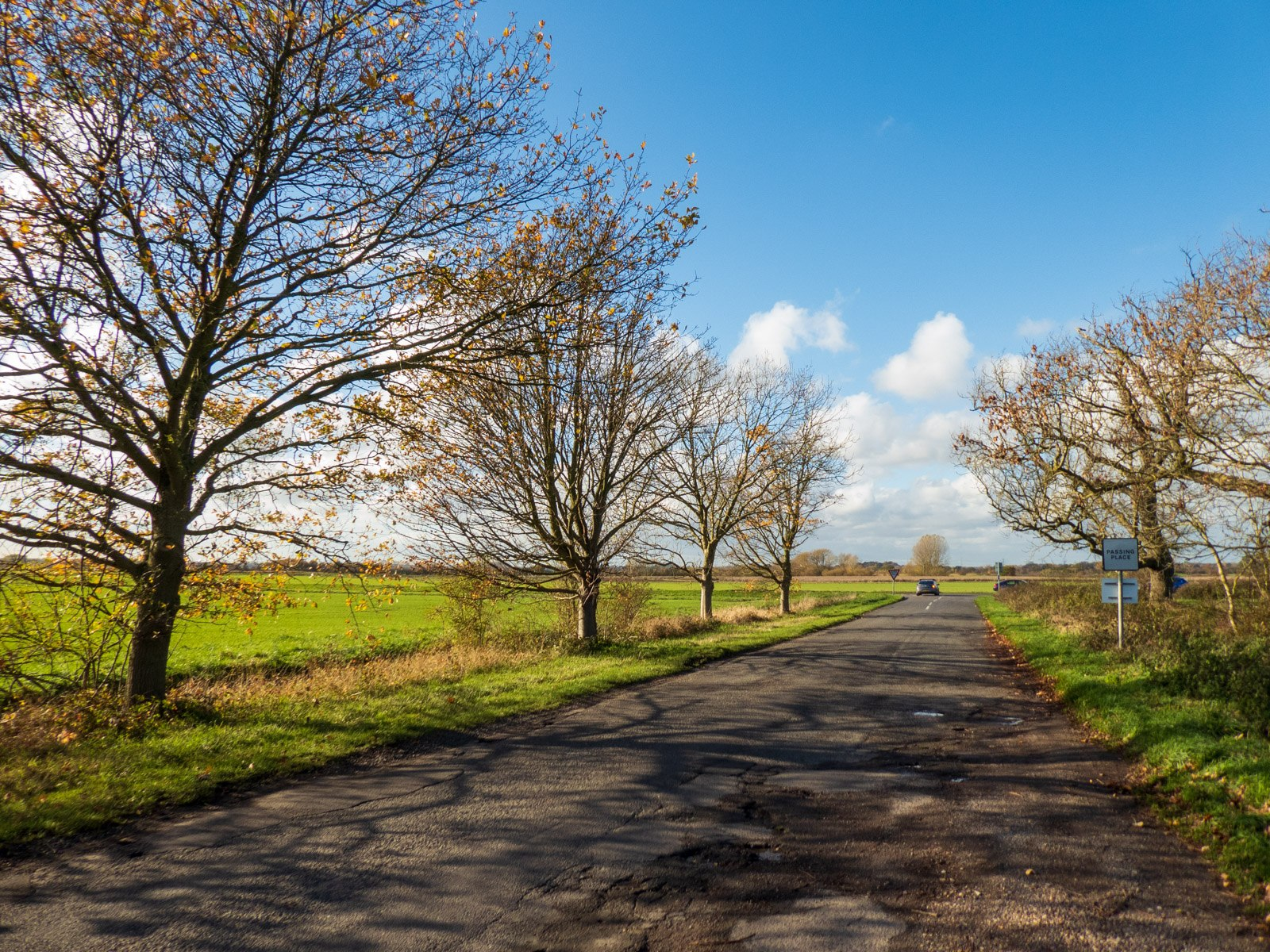
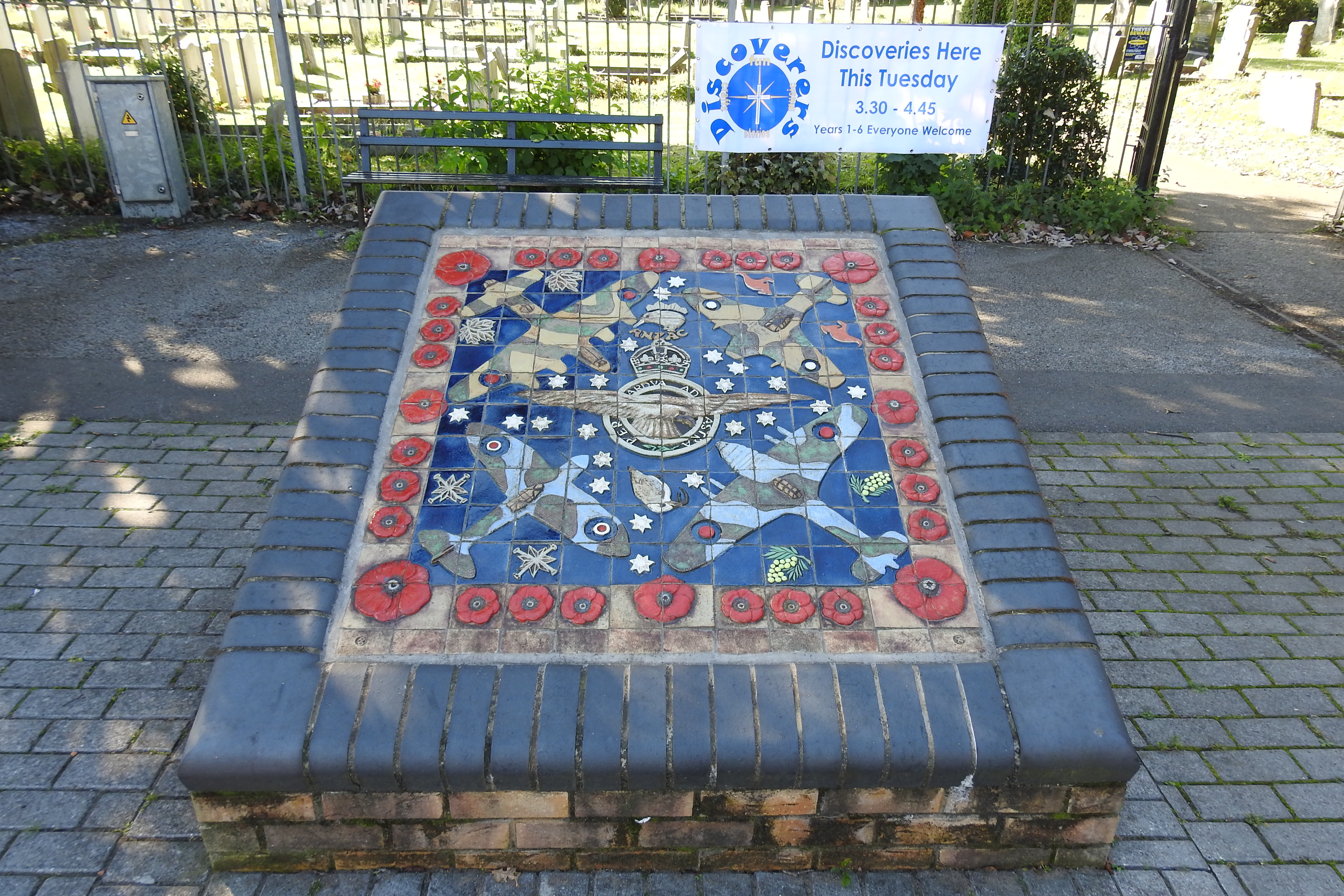
- St Michael’s Church Somerton Gate RAF Waddington

- Location within Lincolnshire
- Population: 12,622 (2021 Census includes Bracebridge Heath)
  - London: 140 mi (230 km) S
- District: North Kesteven
- Shire county: Lincolnshire
- Region: East Midlands
- Country: England
- Sovereign state: United Kingdom
- Areas of the village: List: Bracebridge Heath (Village); Bracebridge Low Fields (Part); Harmston (Village); Waddington Low Fields
- Post town: LINCOLN
- Postcode district: LN5
- Dialling code: 01522
- Police: Lincolnshire
- Fire: Lincolnshire
- Ambulance: East Midlands
- UK Parliament: Sleaford and North Hykeham
- Website: https://waddington.parish.lincolnshire.gov.uk/

Waddington is a village and civil parish in the North Kesteven district of Lincolnshire, England, situated approximately 4 miles (6 km) south of Lincoln on the A607 Grantham Road. The village is known for its association with RAF Waddington. At the 2001 Census Waddington had a population of 6,086, increasing to 6,122 at the 2011 census.

== History ==
The name 'Waddington' means 'farm/settlement of the people of Wada'.

The village is a documented settlement in the Domesday Book of 1086 and was mainly an agricultural community until the late 19th century. Horseracing also took place on the heathland areas, which are now part of the RAF station. At various times other activities including malting, brick-making and stone-quarrying have taken place in the village.

Richard de Soham, a senior judge and Crown official in Ireland, was appointed parish priest of Waddington in 1303, and apparently retired there in 1305.

In 1790 Mary Farmery and Susanna Locker both laid claim to the affections of a young man; this produced a challenge from the former to fight for the prize, which was accepted by the latter. Proper sidesmen were chosen, and every matter conducted in form. After several knock-down blows on both sides, the boxing battle ended in favour of Mary Farmery.

Around 1830, George Boole, the mathematician, taught at Waddington Academy Boarding School in the village, run by Robert Hall. From 1838 to 1840, Boole lived in the village and became headmaster of the academy.

Enemy action during 1941 severely damaged 71 houses in the village, as well as the Horse & Jockey pub and the NAAFI building on the RAF station. The damage was mainly caused by two aerial mines; large bombs dropped by parachute and fused to explode before hitting the ground. Eleven people were killed, among them the NAAFI manager, Mrs Constance Raven, after whom the All-Ranks Club on the RAF station is still named.

=== Second World War ===
The village 12th-century St Michael and All Angels church was rebuilt in 1721 and destroyed in a Second World War air raid. It was replaced by the present-day Anglican parish church of St Michael on High Street, a modern stone building consecrated in 1954.

On the night of 8 May 1941, St Michael and All Angels, had a direct hit from a 2,000lb parachute mine (a moonlit night, the blast could be heard from Newark, where it had woken people up), and another 2,000lb parachute mine landed in the vicarage garden, taking off the roofs of nearby houses; also seven people were killed, that night, when the local NAAFI had a direct hit.

The original Great War memorial was also destroyed and replaced by the current memorial.

== Geography ==
High Dyke, the road that runs between the main RAF station and the service married quarters, lies on the line of the Roman road Ermine Street. There is only minor evidence that High Dyke is Ermine Street, but the alignment is so exact that it is unlikely to be a coincidence. Ermine Street, as it passes Byards Leap 20 miles (32 km) to the south, is also called High Dyke. The traceable line of Ermine Street peters out in the adjacent village of Harmston and does not reappear until the other side of Lincoln.

Waddington Low Fields lies to the west of the village. Historically an area of open downland, some residential development has taken place in the 20th and 21st centuries.

=== Topography ===
Waddington is known as a Lincolnshire Cliff Village, as it is situated on a ridge of Jurassic limestone called the Lincoln Edge or Lincoln Cliff Waddington lies 3 miles (5 km) south of Lincoln and 13 miles (21 km) north-northwest of Sleaford.

During the Ice Age, most of the region surrounding Waddington was covered by ice sheets and this has influenced the topography and nature of the soils. Waddington's cliff-top position means it is 226 ft (69 m) above sea level, giving it commanding views over the River Witham valley.

The Viking Way enters the village from the north on Far Lane and passes south along High Street then briefly along Millers Road.

== Community facilities ==
The parish council office is located on High Street. There is a medical practice on Grantham Road, and a chiropody practice on Bar Lane. The Lincolnshire Fire Brigade premises are situated on Mere Road.

The village shops are mainly located in the Bar Lane area of the upper part of the village and the Redwood Drive Shopping Centre in the lower part of the village. There is an Indian takeaway outlet and a fish and chip shop. A post office and library are incorporated within the Co-operative Pharmacy premises on Bar Lane. Zoo Ceramics pottery workshop and gallery are situated next to the post office.

There are three village public houses: the Horse and Jockey (now closed) which faces onto the old village square at the centre of the village, the Three Horse Shoes, adjacent to St Michael's Church on High Street, and the Wheatsheaf, at the crossroads of the Lincoln to Grantham road (A607) and Mere Road, the main access road to RAF Waddington. There is also a pub restaurant, the Crow's Nest.

The village is also home to Foss Dyke Band who became one of the few brass bands in the UK to gain promotion from fourth section to championship section over a period of seven years and in 2013 established a new brass band in the village, Witham Brass.

The village is served by bus links to Lincoln and Grantham, operated by the Stagecoach Group.

== Buildings ==
The older part of the village primarily consists of buildings built of the local limestone along with some brick-built houses built after brick-making began to take place on the lower slopes of the village. Newer residential areas are located in the Brant Road part of the village (which is at the bottom of the Lincoln Edge and has merged with the Lincoln suburb of Bracebridge), and are of modern brick and tile construction. The more modern areas of the village have developed down the steep hill towards Lincoln.

== Education ==
There are two primary schools within the parish of Waddington. All Saints' Primary School is in the upper part of the village on Mere Road, and Waddington Redwood Academy is in the lower part of the village off Brant Road.

== RAF Waddington ==
RAF Waddington is a British airfield east of the village's centre. It is one of the oldest airfields in the UK, founded in November 1916 for the Royal Flying Corps. RAF Waddington is the RAF's main ISTAR airfield, operating amongst others the E-3D Sentry (a.k.a. AWACS) reconnaissance aircraft. Previous to this, the station had been home to part of the Avro Vulcan nuclear bomber force.

RAF Waddington is now home to 13 Sqn who operate the MQ-9 Reaper Remotely Piloted Air Vehicles (RPAS), although the aircraft are not physically based there.

Two Commonwealth air force personnel of the First World War and 33 of the Second World War buried from this airfield have war graves in a plot St Michael's Churchyard.

== Climate ==
According to the Köppen classification, the British Isles experience a maritime climate characterised by relatively cool summers and mild winters. Compared with other parts of the country, Lincolnshire – and Waddington – are slightly warmer and sunnier in the summer and colder and frostier in the winter. Owing to Waddington's inland position, far from the landfall of most Atlantic depressions, it is one of the driest places to live in the UK, receiving, on average, just over 2 ft (610 mm) of rain per year. The mean annual daily duration of bright sunshine is four hours and 30 minutes.

In the July 2022 heatwave, Waddington jointly recorded the new record high with nearby Coningsby at 40.3 °C (104.5 °F) on the 19th. However, the Met Office does not officially recognise the joint record due to unstated "non-standard practices", and Coningsby is solely credited with the July 2022 all-time record. Waddington's records are in line with other stations and there is no known reason for why the record could be anomalous.

Climate data for Waddington, elevation: 68 m (223 ft), 1991–2020 normals, extremes 1948–present
Month	Jan	Feb	Mar	Apr	May	Jun	Jul	Aug	Sep	Oct	Nov	Dec	Year
Record high °C (°F)	14.2 (57.6)	17.4 (63.3)	22.4 (72.3)	27.0 (80.6)	27.8 (82.0)	32.6 (90.7)	40.3 (104.5)	34.8 (94.6)	30.0 (86.0)	29.2 (84.6)	17.8 (64.0)	15.5 (59.9)	40.3 (104.5)
Mean daily maximum °C (°F)	7.0 (44.6)	7.7 (45.9)	10.2 (50.4)	13.1 (55.6)	16.3 (61.3)	19.1 (66.4)	21.6 (70.9)	21.4 (70.5)	18.3 (64.9)	14.1 (57.4)	9.9 (49.8)	7.2 (45.0)	13.9 (57.0)
Daily mean °C (°F)	4.3 (39.7)	4.7 (40.5)	6.6 (43.9)	9.0 (48.2)	12.0 (53.6)	14.8 (58.6)	17.1 (62.8)	17.0 (62.6)	14.4 (57.9)	10.9 (51.6)	7.1 (44.8)	4.6 (40.3)	10.2 (50.4)
Mean daily minimum °C (°F)	1.6 (34.9)	1.7 (35.1)	3.0 (37.4)	4.9 (40.8)	7.6 (45.7)	10.5 (50.9)	12.7 (54.9)	12.6 (54.7)	10.5 (50.9)	7.6 (45.7)	4.3 (39.7)	2.0 (35.6)	6.6 (43.9)
Record low °C (°F)	−13.8 (7.2)	−15.6 (3.9)	−11.1 (12.0)	−4.7 (23.5)	−2.0 (28.4)	0.0 (32.0)	3.3 (37.9)	3.9 (39.0)	0.0 (32.0)	−3.2 (26.2)	−6.7 (19.9)	−14.0 (6.8)	−15.6 (3.9)
Average precipitation mm (inches)	47.6 (1.87)	38.4 (1.51)	36.4 (1.43)	44.3 (1.74)	47.0 (1.85)	60.3 (2.37)	60.3 (2.37)	58.3 (2.30)	52.0 (2.05)	61.4 (2.42)	56.9 (2.24)	51.9 (2.04)	614.8 (24.20)
Average precipitation days (≥ 1.0 mm)	10.6	9.0	8.6	8.9	8.9	9.3	9.2	9.3	8.7	10.7	11.6	10.7	115.5
Average relative humidity (%)	86	84	80	79	77	77	77	79	80	84	85	87	81
Mean monthly sunshine hours	62.2	86.0	125.6	168.2	211.6	190.8	206.3	192.0	146.7	109.3	71.3	61.3	1,631.2
Source 1: Met Office NOAA (Relative humidity 1961–1990)
Source 2: KNMI
