= David de Offington =

English-born Crown official

Sir David de Offington (died c.1312) was an English-born Crown official in late thirteenth-century Ireland. He was one of the earliest recorded holders of the office of High Sheriff of County Dublin and the first recorded Baron of the Court of Exchequer (Ireland). He became a substantial landowner in Leinster.

He came to Ireland in about 1273. Seven years later he received a royal pardon for all trespasses committed by him in England. He made repeated journeys back to his home country. In 1294 he received the King's protection for two years for his return journey to Ireland. He first appears in Ireland as custodian of the Irish estates of George de Cantilupe, Lord of Abergavenny, who attained his majority that year, but died a few months later. David was Sheriff of County Dublin (one of the earliest named Sheriffs: Ralph Eure, who was probably the first, was appointed in 1258), and Constable of Newcastle, County Wicklow in 1282, and received a knighthood. He was also seneschal of Kilkenny and custodian for the Irish lands of Gilbert de Clare, 7th Earl of Gloucester. He travelled to Connacht on unspecified "King's business". He acquired the manors of Ballykenna, County Kilkenny and Ballyteeogue, County Kildare, which were granted to him by Walter de Fulburn, Dean and later Bishop of Waterford, in about 1284 or 1285, and other lands in County Carlow. He seems to have lived mainly at Ballykenna, as evidenced by his last will. He was in England in 1294, and was given leave to return to Ireland.

He was appointed Baron of the Irish Exchequer in 1294: It appears that his appointment was originally for two years only. The Court was a very recent creation, and this was some years before the first Chief Baron of the Irish Exchequer was appointed. David seems to have been the first Baron, although there are a few references to other men, like William le Brun, who held an office of that name earlier, and he presumably sat alone until he was joined on the Court by Richard de Soham, another English-born official long resident in Ireland, the following year. His date of death is sometimes given as 1299, but this was probably the date of his retirement from the Exchequer, as his will, now in the National Library of Ireland, is dated about 1312. His son Thomas succeeded to his estates.

== Sources ==
- Ball, F. Elrington The Judges in Ireland 1221-1921 London John Murray 1926
- Calendar of Patent Rolls of Edward I Vol. 3
- National Archives SC/1/31/174: "The profit of a County in Ireland and David de Offington... (1292)"
- National Library of Ireland D340 "Grant by Walter de Fulburn Dean of Waterford to David Offington of land at Ballyteeogue and Ballykenan 1284 to 1286"
- National Library of Ireland D412 "Will and inventory of David Offynton c.1312"
- National Library of Ireland D563 "Release by Thomas de Offington of all claim to Lethcyok (Loughteeogue)....1312"
