= John Le Decer =

Mayor of Dublin, Ireland

John Le Decer (died 1332) was a fourteenth-century Mayor of Dublin, who had a notable record of charitable works and civic improvement.

John Le Decer served as mayor on six occasions, in 1302, 1305, from 1307 to 1309 and in 1324. He was a man of considerable wealth, and carried out a number of noted public works "at his own expense".

He was married and had at least one daughter, Elena, who married Robert de Meones, of the prominent Anglo-Irish De Meones family who gave their name to the suburb of Rathmines in south Dublin. They had at least one son, John de Meones, who served three terms as Mayor of Dublin between 1331 and 1338.

== Civil projects ==
=== Public water supply ===
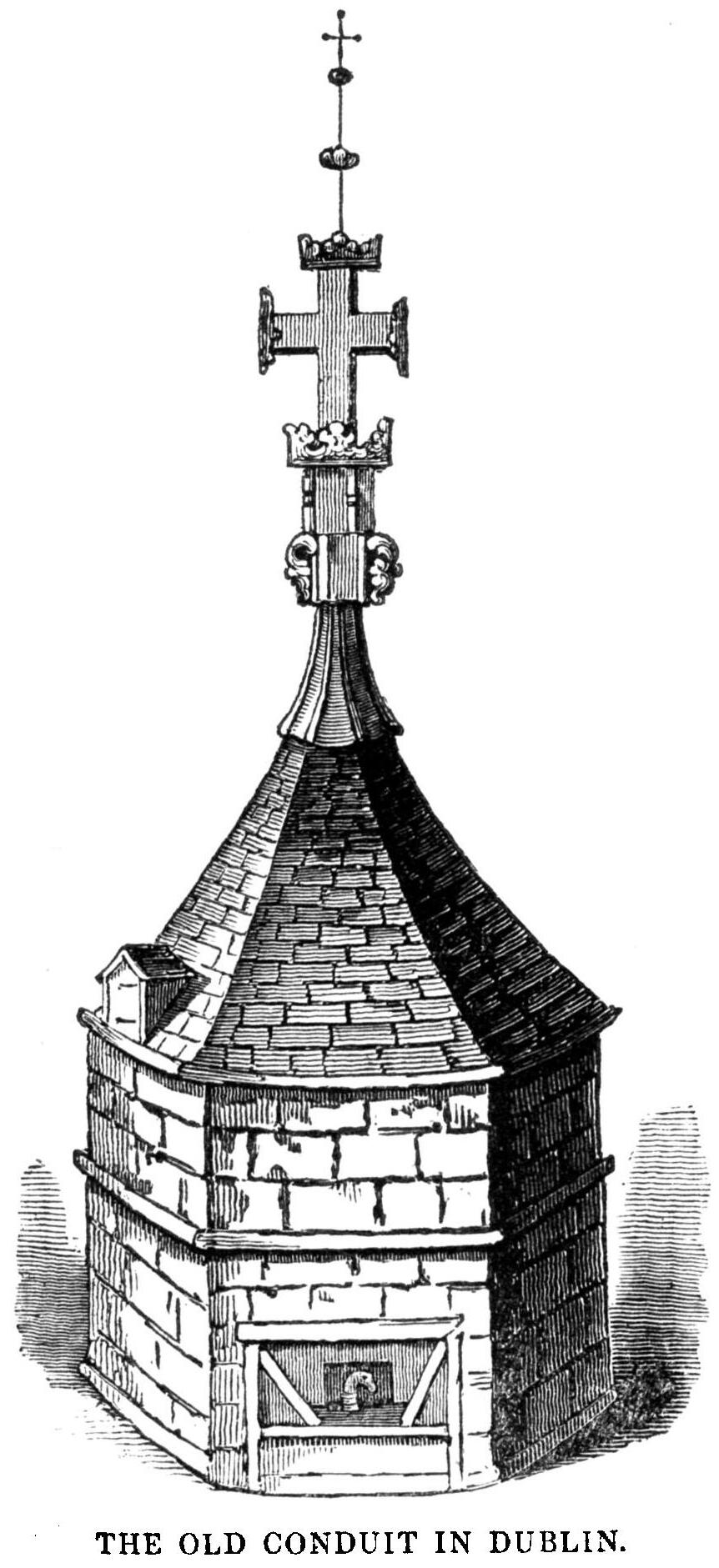
Cornmarket, Dublin, 1308

His most striking project was the marble cistern he built in 1308. This held Dublin's main water conduit in Cornmarket, adjacent to St. Audoen's Church in the centre of the medieval city, a work "such as was never seen here before". It was commonly called "Le Decer's Fountain", and is so described on the 1400 map of St. Audoen's Church and parish. He set up Dublin's so-called "Lucky Stone" (a ninth-century grave marker) there, reputedly so that everyone who drank from the cistern should have good luck; it had previously been situated inside St Audoen's.

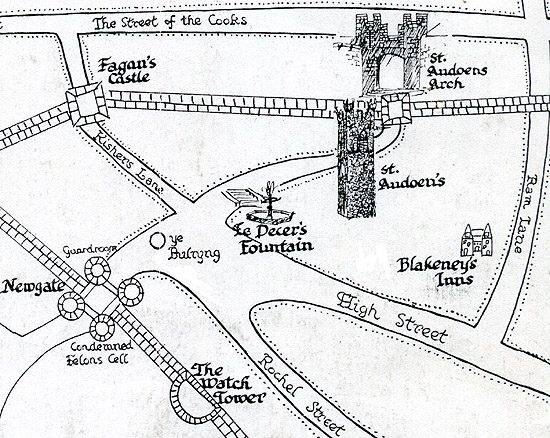
St. Audoen's Church and arch (1400) with the cistern, "Le Decer's fountain", marked in the centre of the map, to the left of the church

=== New bridge ===
In 1308 he built a bridge over the River Liffey, called New Bridge, near St. Wolstan's Priory, about halfway between Celbridge and Leixlip, County Kildare. He also built "at great expense" a bridge over the River Tolka at Ballybough, northeast of Dublin city, in 1313, but this was destroyed by floods not long afterwards. During a time of famine (probably the Great Famine of 1315–1317), he hired three ships to go to France and buy corn, which he distributed to the poor of Dublin. He also made a free gift of corn to the Prior of Christchurch Cathedral, Dublin, who lacked the money to buy it. He is described, in William Camden's Britannia (updated by Richard Gough c.1790), as an "excellent magistrate".

=== Religious houses ===
He was also generous in his support for religious houses, paying for the building of a new chapel in the Priory of Kilmainham, and for extensive works in the Monastery of Saint Francis. The Franciscan monastery, founded in 1235, was situated on present-day Francis Street in Dublin city centre, but all trace of it has vanished. It was his custom to entertain the monks of Saint Francis to dinner once a week. It was in the chapel of this monastery that he was buried in 1332.
