= John Radcliffe (MP, died 1441) =

English knight and administrator

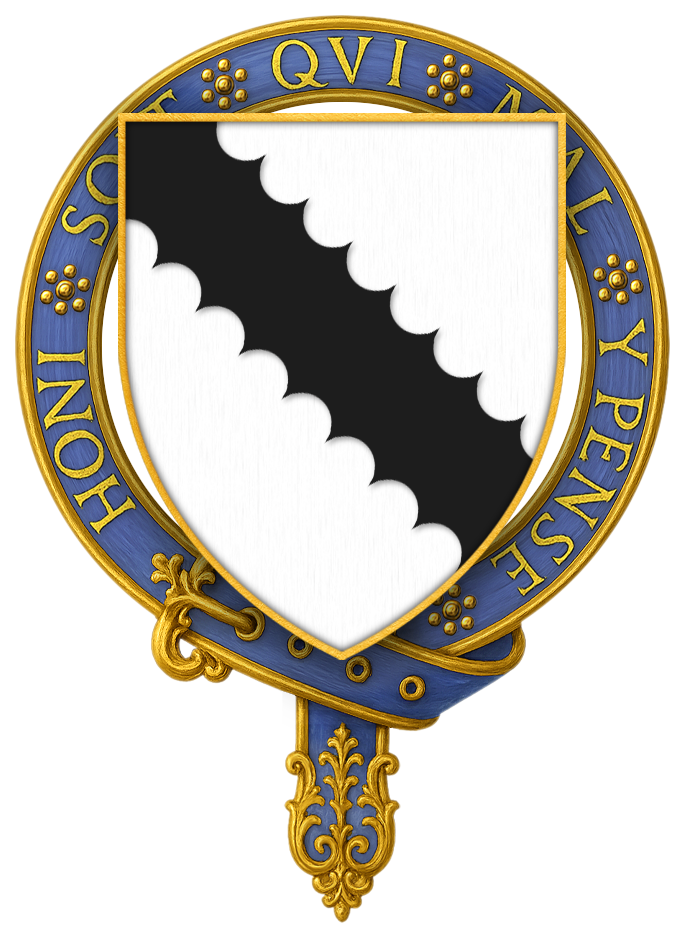
Arms of Sir John Radcliffe, Knight of the Garter.

Sir John Radcliffe KG (died 1441), of Attleborough, was an English knight and administrator who served as Seneschal of Gascony, 2nd Baron of the Court of Exchequer (Ireland), Joint Chief Butler of Ireland, Bailli of Evreux and Constable of Bordeaux. He represented Norfolk as a Member of Parliament in 1420 and 1427.

== Life ==
Radcliffe was the younger son of James Radcliffe of Radcliffe, Lancashire and Joan Tempest. John spent his early years in the entourage of Thomas of Lancaster. He is described as Thomas's Secretary, and went with him to Ireland in 1401, when Thomas was appointed Lord Lieutenant of Ireland. He was appointed second Baron of the Irish Court of Exchequer in 1404. It is unclear if he had any legal qualifications: despite their senior judicial office, Irish Barons were not then invariably lawyers. He was appointed in April 1406, Joint Chief Butler of Ireland by Thomas.

John died in 1441 and was buried at Attleborough church, Norfolk, England.

== Marriage and issue ==
Radcliffe married firstly, Cecilia, daughter of Thomas Mortimer and Mary Parke. The marriage brought him considerable wealth and an increase in his social standing. She was a maternal half-sister of Sir John Fastolf and mother of Sir Robert Harling. They are known to have had the following issue:

- John Radcliffe
- Thomas Radcliffe
- Fynette Radcliffe
- Roger Radcliffe

He married secondly, Catherine, daughter of Edward Burnell and Alice Le Strange, they are known to have had the following issue:

- James Radcliffe
- Robert Radcliffe
- Alicia Radcliffe
