= Court of Exchequer (Ireland) =

Senior court of common law in Ireland

The Court of Exchequer in Ireland, or the Irish Exchequer of Pleas, was one of the senior courts of common law in Ireland. It was the mirror image of the equivalent court in England. The Court of Exchequer was one of the four royal courts of justice which gave their name to the building in Dublin in which they were located, which is still called the Four Courts, and is in use as a courthouse.

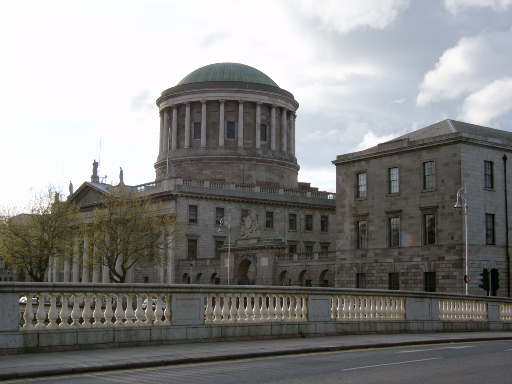
The Four Courts, present day

== History ==
According to Elrington Ball the Irish Court of Exchequer was established by 1295, and by 1310 it was headed by the Chief Baron of the Irish Exchequer, assisted by at least one associate Baron of the Exchequer. The office of Baron apparently predated the establishment of the Court itself: there are references to officials called Barons of the Irish Exchequer, like William le Brun, as early as the 1250s, though these were probably tax collectors, not judges. The Court seems to have functioned for some years without a Chief Baron. Sir David de Offington, former Sheriff of County Dublin, was apparently the first Baron appointed to the new Court in 1294, followed by Richard de Soham the following year, and William de Meones in 1299. The first Chief Baron was Walter de Islip, an English-born judge and statesman who also served as Lord Treasurer of Ireland. Three of the earliest Statutes of the Irish Parliament, enacted in 1294 and 1303, are entitled "Treasurer and Barons of Exchequer". The Barons might combine a seat on the Bench with another office within the Exchequer, such as Engrosser, Summoner, Chief Remembrancer, or Chief Auditor of the Accounts. Occasionally a Baron might have another position which was not attached to the Court: Thomas Archbold was Master of the Irish Mint when he became a judge, and retained that office throughout his time on the Court of Exchequer.

The early Barons were usually English-born, with a record of public service. Although they ranked as High Court judges, they were not required to be qualified barristers, and from 1400 on numerous complaints were made about their lack of legal expertise. An act of the Irish Parliament in 1421 was aimed at those Barons who were described ominously as "illiterate men performing office in the Exchequer through deputy" and accused them of extortion. In 1442 it was suggested that the administration of the Irish Government would be improved if the Chief Baron at least was a properly trained lawyer. This criticism was principally aimed at Michael Gryffin, the incumbent Chief Baron, who had no legal qualifications for the job. Thomas Shorthalls, another Baron in the early 1440s, had a background in local government, although he had also acted as an attorney. His colleague Francis Toppesfeld had been a royal esquire of the body and a senior official in the Royal household under Henry IV. The same is true of Sir John Radcliffe, later one of the most distinguished English commanders in France. Their colleague Peter Clynton (or Clayton) later became collector of customs for Dublin and Drogheda. As late as the 1480s Thomas Archbold (alias Galmole), one of the Barons, was a goldsmith by trade, and Master of the Irish Royal Mint, although he may also have qualified as a lawyer.

Part of the explanation for their lack of legal expertise may lie in the fact that in the early years of the Court, the Barons acted as tax collectors as well as judges: the Patent Rolls contain numerous references to Barons being sent to the provinces to "levy the King's debts". Such employment required physical endurance and some knowledge of financial matters, rather than legal ability. As late as the 1660s, the Crown regarded the Court of Exchequer primarily as a body for increasing revenue and detecting fraud: for that reason, the Court of Exchequer was regarded by the Crown as the most important of the courts of common law.

The Court of Exchequer was originally located in a building called Collett's Inn, which is thought to have been situated roughly on present-day South Great George's Street in Dublin city centre. Collett's was destroyed in a raid by the O'Tooles and O'Byrne clans from County Wicklow early in the fourteenth century. The replacement office was burnt during the Scots Invasion of Ireland in 1316. This however was not an act of aggression but a defence measure by the Dubliners themselves.

== The move to Carlow ==
In about 1360 the Court of Exchequer, together with the Court of Common Pleas (Ireland), moved for some thirty years to Carlow, which was then closer to the centre of the Pale (that part of Ireland which was under secure English rule) than was Dublin, but local disturbances in Carlow eventually brought it back to Dublin in the 1390s. In 1376 John Brettan, one of the Barons of the Exchequer, and a native of the town, petitioned the Crown for redress for his journeys to Carlow "where the Exchequer was...in time of war, when the other Barons dared not go there". Significantly he referred to the "late burning of Carlow" by the Irish of Leinster, in which he had lost his house and much of his movable property. This was no doubt a reference to the fire of 1376, although there had also been a serious one in 1363.

There is one reference in 1390 to the liberty of Ulster having a separate Court of Exchequer, with its own Chief Baron. This Court seems to have been short-lived In 1405 Robert White was Chancellor and Treasurer of Ulster.

== The Court in the seventeenth century ==
After the Restoration of Charles II it is clear that the Crown regarded the Exchequer as the most important of the Irish courts of common law. A letter from King Charles II in October 1662, increasing the salary of one of the Barons, refers to the crucial role of the Exchequer in preventing fraud against the revenue, and increasing the revenue by all lawful means. It stresses the great "labour and pain" that the Barons employed in the task, much of it at their own expense. The order to increase their salary is significant since King Charles was perennially short of money.

== The Court in the eighteenth century ==
Although the workload of the Court of Exchequer in the early centuries was not as heavy as that of the Court of King's Bench, it became notorious for slowness and inefficiency; an eighteenth-century Baron, John St Leger, spoke of the Court being in a state of "confusion and disorganisation almost past remedy". Due to its inefficiency, it lost a good deal of business to the other courts, especially to the Court of Chancery, in the course of the eighteenth century. The death of Thomas Dalton, the Chief Baron, in 1730 was believed by his friends to have been hastened by his heavy workload.

The Court of Exchequer's reputation was further damaged by its judgment in Sherlock v. Annesley. In itself, a routine property dispute between two cousins, the lawsuit revived the long-standing quarrel between the English House of Lords and the Irish House of Lords as to which House was the final court of appeal from the Irish courts. The decision of the Barons of the Exchequer that they were obliged to implement the decree of the English House infuriated the Irish House, which imprisoned the Barons for contempt of Parliament. To resolve the matter the British Government passed the Declaratory Act 1719, removing the power of the Irish House of Lords to hear appeals. This Act became notorious in Ireland as the Sixth of George I, and quite unfairly the judges of the Court of Exchequer bore the brunt of the blame for it: as one of the Barons, John Pocklington, remarked: "a flame burst forth, and the country's last resentment was visited upon us".

== The Court in the nineteenth century ==
By the mid-nineteenth century, the Exchequer had overtaken the Court of King's Bench as the busiest of the courts of common law , and the death of Chief Baron Woulfe, in 1840, like that of his predecessor Thomas Dalton in the previous century, was widely blamed on his crushing workload (indeed Woulfe, who suffered from chronic ill health, had been warned that the job would kill him, and had accepted it with considerable reluctance).

Traditionally the judge holding office as third Baron tended to resist promotion since his office, though junior, had a number of fees and perquisites attached which were not available to more senior judges.

== Abolition ==
On the passing of the Supreme Court of Judicature Act (Ireland) 1877, the Court of Exchequer was merged with the other Courts of common law and the Court of Chancery (Ireland) and became a division of the High Court of Justice in Ireland. In a further reorganisation of the Court system in 1897 the Exchequer Division was abolished. The last Chief Baron, Christopher Palles, retained his rank until he retired in 1916, by which time his reputation for judicial eminence was so high that, despite his advanced age (he was eighty-four) and increasing physical frailty, the Government only accepted his resignation with great reluctance.

== See also ==
- Chief Baron of the Irish Exchequer
- Christopher Palles
