= Wood Quay =

Riverside area of Dublin

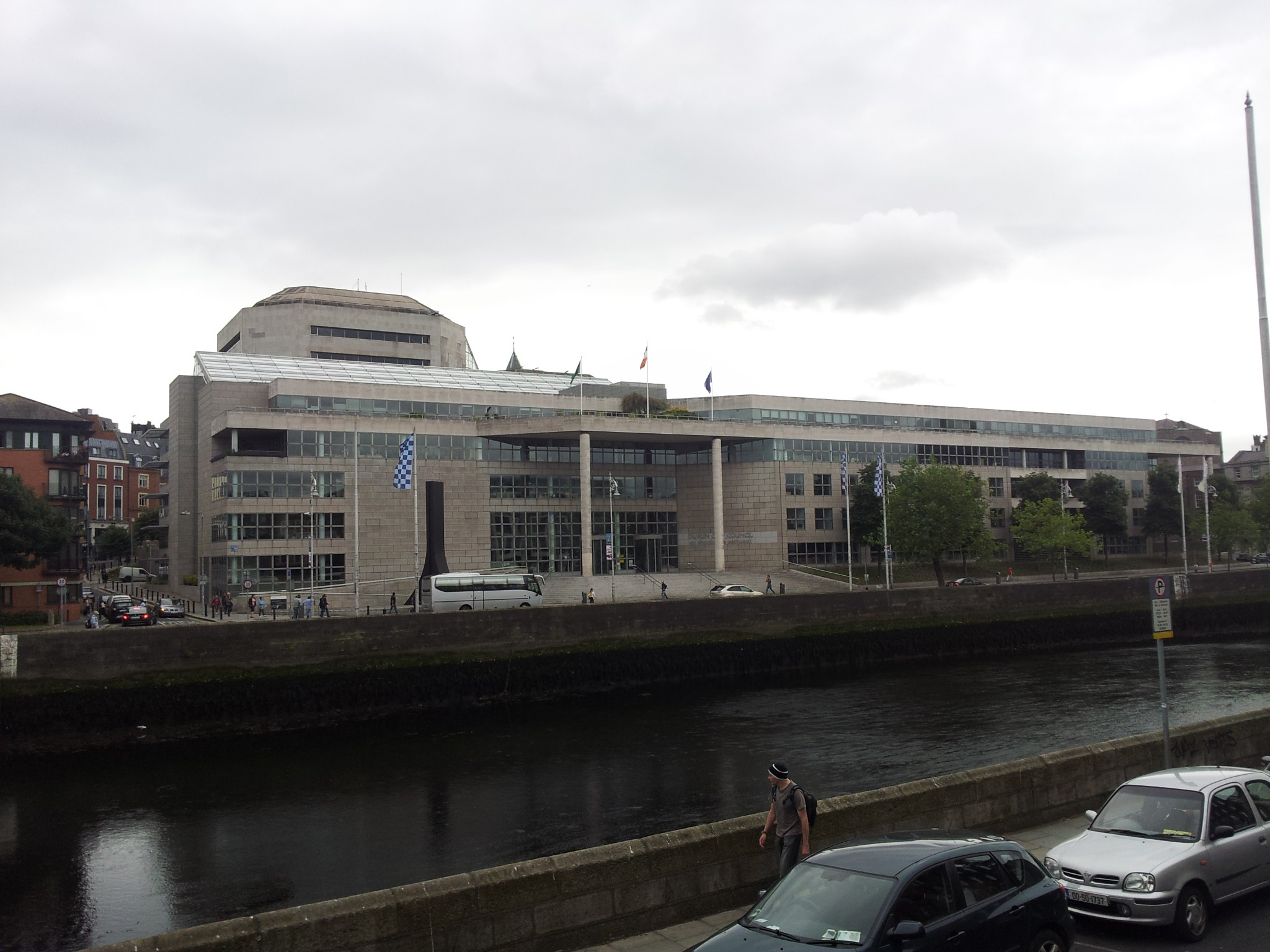
- Dublin City Council buildings on Wood Quay

- Location within Central Dublin
- Native name: Cé Adhmaid (Irish)
- Namesake: Was originally surfaced with wood
- Length: 130 m (430 ft)
- Width: 30 metres (98 ft)
- Location: Dublin, Ireland
- Postal code: D08
- Coordinates: 53.345°N 6.271°W
- West end: Merchant's Quay, Winetavern Street, O'Donovan Rossa Bridge
- East end: Fishamble Street, Essex Quay

Construction
- Construction start: Medieval era

Other
- Known for: Dublin City Council offices, archaeological remains

Wood Quay (Irish: An Ché Adhmaid) is a riverside area of Dublin that was a site of Viking settlement. It is now the location of the Dublin City Council offices.

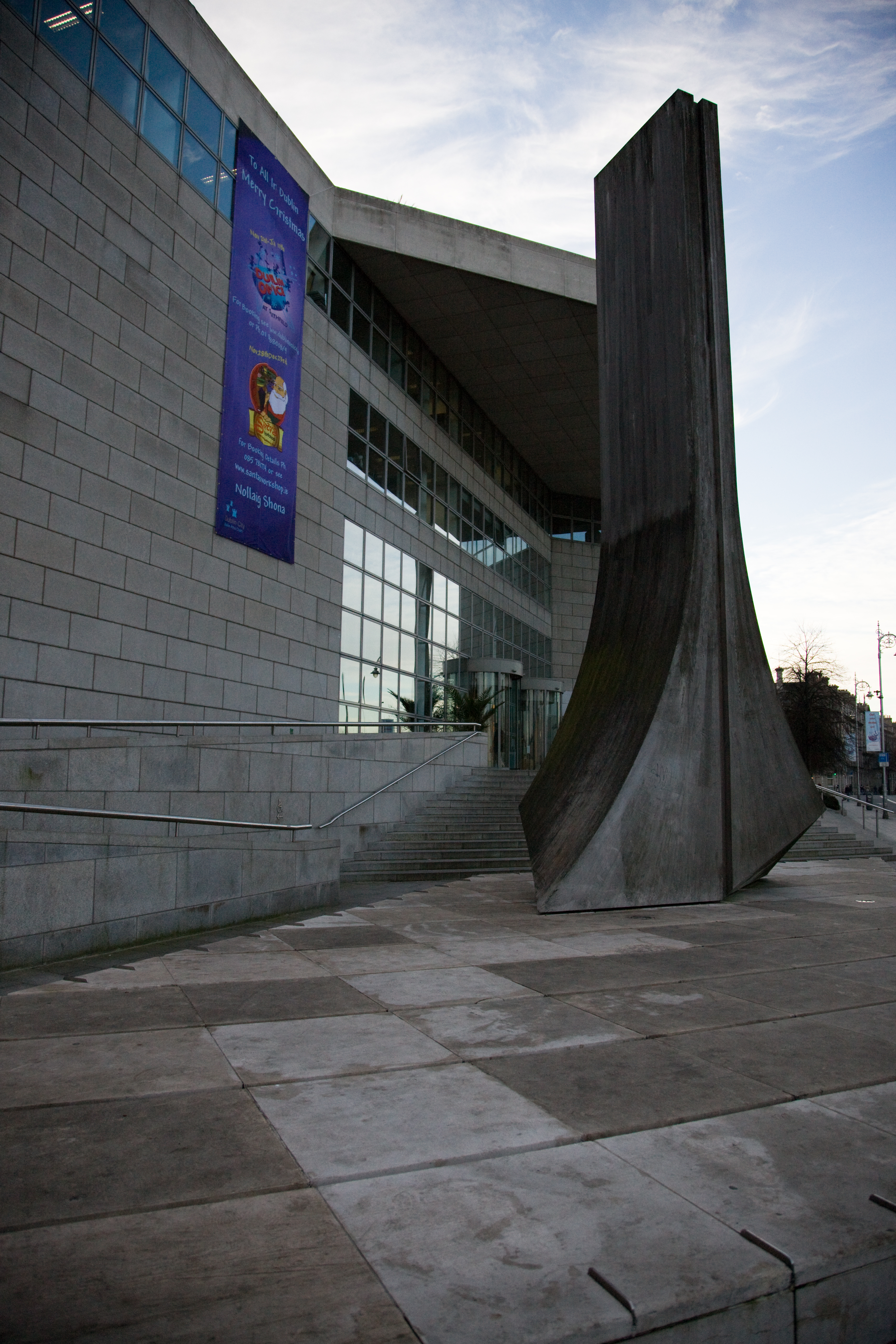
Wooden Sculpture 'Wood Quay' by Michael Warren outside the offices of Dublin City Council. The sculpture is intended to invoke the prow of a Viking longship

== Location ==
The site is bounded on the north side by Wood Quay on the River Liffey, on the west by Winetavern Street, on the south by John's Lane and on the east by Fishamble Street. Two bridges cross the river at Wood Quay, one at the eastern and the other at the western end. The bridge at the eastern end is Grattan Bridge, formerly known as Essex Bridge, named after 18th century parliamentarian Henry Grattan. The bridge at the westerly end of Wood Quay is O'Donovan Rossa Bridge (formerly Richmond Bridge) named after the 19th century Fenian.

== History ==
=== Plans for redevelopment ===
Dublin Corporation acquired Wood Quay gradually from the 1950s, having voted on the plans for the new office development on 4-acres in front of Christchurch Cathedral in January 1956 finally. The first design was by Jones and Kelly, and would have completely obscured the view of the cathedral from the quays. After some criticism of the plan, including strong concern from the Royal Institute of the Architects of Ireland, this design was abandoned. By special compulsory purchase order, the Corporation began assembling the site, having the full plot by 1967. At this time, demolition of the existing buildings began, including that of O'Meara's pub on the corner of Winetavern Street.

The Corporation then announced a competition to developers which would see them select a design for the development, publishing a 4-page brief on the requirements. In November 1968, they exhibited the models of the 6 finalists at City Hall. Critical response to the designs was poor, and the fact that it appeared the Corporation themselves would choose the winner with no architectural input was met with shock and derision. After some pressure, a 12 man board of assessors was appointed to select the winning scheme. Desmond Leslie surmised that none of the designs made much effort to lessen their impact on Christchurch Cathedral or to consider it as part of the wider built environment. Among those who entered designs were Desmond FitzGerald, Michael Scott and Partners, and Sam Stephenson. Stephenson's design for the Green Property Group was selected as the winner, which a design including 4 office blocks in varying heights from 5 to 10 storeys.

The plans were submitted for planning approval, resulting in two city departments rejecting the plans on technical grounds. However, the city manager, Matt Macken, decided to override these objections and grant full approval on 24 December 1970. More than 30 groups and individuals lodged objections, including the National Monuments Advisory Council. Many also appealed to the relevant minister, Bobby Molloy. An oral hearing was held in March 1971, with Molloy eventually confirming the decision by Macken in July 1972. This approval had 15 conditions, including "that all reasonable opportunities and facilities shall be afforded to the National Monuments Advisory Council to inspect, record and recover matter of archaeological interest" from the site.

=== 20th century excavations ===
Large-scale archaeological excavations were conducted on the site by the National Museum of Ireland at intervals between 1973 and 1981 after some initial exploration of the site in 1969. The excavations stipulated by the planning permission were led by Pat Wallace. They took place over an area of 4 acres, and uncovered 100 dwellings, thousands of objects, and a large amount of environmental evidence which covered 5 centuries of medieval occupation of the site. The site has been characterised as less Viking and more "Hiberno-Scandinavian" or "Hiberno-Norse", and represented a prosperous commercial centre. The area was also shown to have been densely populated and confirmed the area as one of the earliest inhabited areas of the city.

The excavations were first disrupted in May 1973, after which bulldozers destroyed areas of the site over the course of 3 months, including a newly discovered section of city wall. A cease order was issued in November 1973 by James Tully, the Minister for Local Government. This was met by widespread public approval and emergence of proposals to build an archaeological park on the site in place of the office development, despite the fact the site was a north-facing, steep one and not suited to becoming a public park. During this period of hiatus, the Corporation explored other sites to develop, including one on Waterford Street, but these were all rejected. Instead it was proposed that the four blocks be relocated on the site to allow for the unobstructed view of the Cathedral from the quays, the lack of which was highlighted as a concern in the cease order. On 13 February 1974, Tully announced the scheme was go ahead which the office block moved to the Fishamble Street side of the site. An Taisce states this was "worst possible solution" and that the modern office blocks "will never be a success and it is our opinion is that they will clash with Christchurch Cathedral in a very incongruous manner".

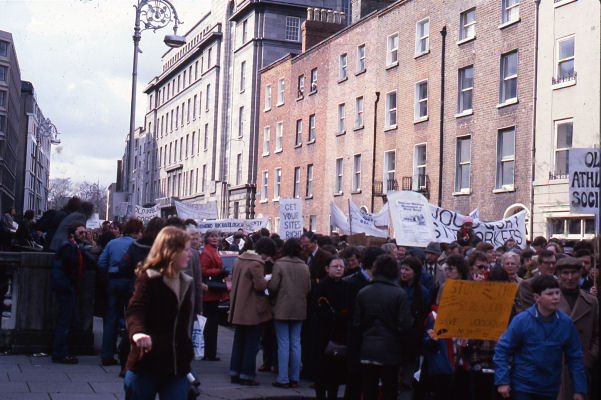
Wood Quay demonstration on Kildare Street, 1978

Finds made during the excavations of the site led to a significant public campaign to halt the development. This was led by Prof. F. X. Martin, who was the chairman of the Friends of Medieval Dublin. The campaign resulted in a large protest march on 23 September 1978, attended by 20,000 people called "Save Wood Quay". On 1 June 1979, a number of 52 protesters began a three-week sit-in at the site, dubbed "Operation Sitric". Among those in the group was the architect Michael Scott, poet Eavan Boland, writer Mary Lavin, and Rita Childers. Over 80 cultural and social groups, including the Council of Europe, appealed for the site to be preserved. The Irish High Court deemed the site to be a National Monument, but the Corporation and the Commissioners of Public Works subverted this. Ulick O'Connor commented that the clear rejection of the desires of the public both through protest and local elections to save the site was "the most terrifying event in this country over the past twenty years". The development went ahead, but the extra time spent over the protests and legal battles over the preservation of the site meant that the excavations were more extension than initially planned. Though parts of the excavations are deemed to have been rushed and incomplete due to manner in which the work unfolded.

Artefacts from the excavations are now on display in the National Museum of Ireland. The large volume of objects excavated from the site is due to the fact the soil conditions were anaerobic, allowing for organic materials, predominately made of wood, to be very well preserved. From the objects discovered, it establishes that not only were agricultural goods traded, but also luxuries like combs and jewellery. The excavations were concluded in March 1981, and now most of the quay is occupied by Dublin City Council's Civic Offices which opened in 1986. While ultimately the campaign for the preservation of Wood Quay was not successful, it highlighted the lack of legal protection for sites of this nature, which has since been addressed.

=== The office development ===
During the hiatus in the project during the early 1970s, and the resulting reconfiguration of the site, Stephenson reworked his original designs. Rather than the initial pre-cast blocks, with flat roofs, and projecting windows, the new design featured chamfered roofs, granite cladding and deep-recessed slit windows. The Corporation was exempt from requiring fresh planning permission for such a radical redesign. With the cost of the development rising, the Corporation decided to split the development into 2 phases.

The journalist Frank MacDonald cited Stephenson's admiration of the German architect Albert Speer as influential on the buildings' stark design. The first phase of the development cost over £20 million, with the 2 granite faced blocks the most expensive office blocks built in Dublin at the time of their completion. This was ten times the original estimate for redeveloping the entire site in 1967. The large cost overruns resulted in the rest of the development being put on hold.

== Later developments ==
In a later excavation between 1990 and 1993 further along the quay at Lower Exchange Street, an archaeological dig team unearthed a roundtower-like ruin from the 13th century called Isolde's Tower. This tower was first discovered in the 17th century, but most of it was destroyed and covered in. Because of the dig, the construction of underground parking facilities for a planned development on the site could not be constructed at their intended location. The tower ruins are now viewable through railings on Lower Exchange Street, and the car park ramp is further to the left.

== See also ==
- Dublin quays
