= Dublinia =

Museum in Ireland

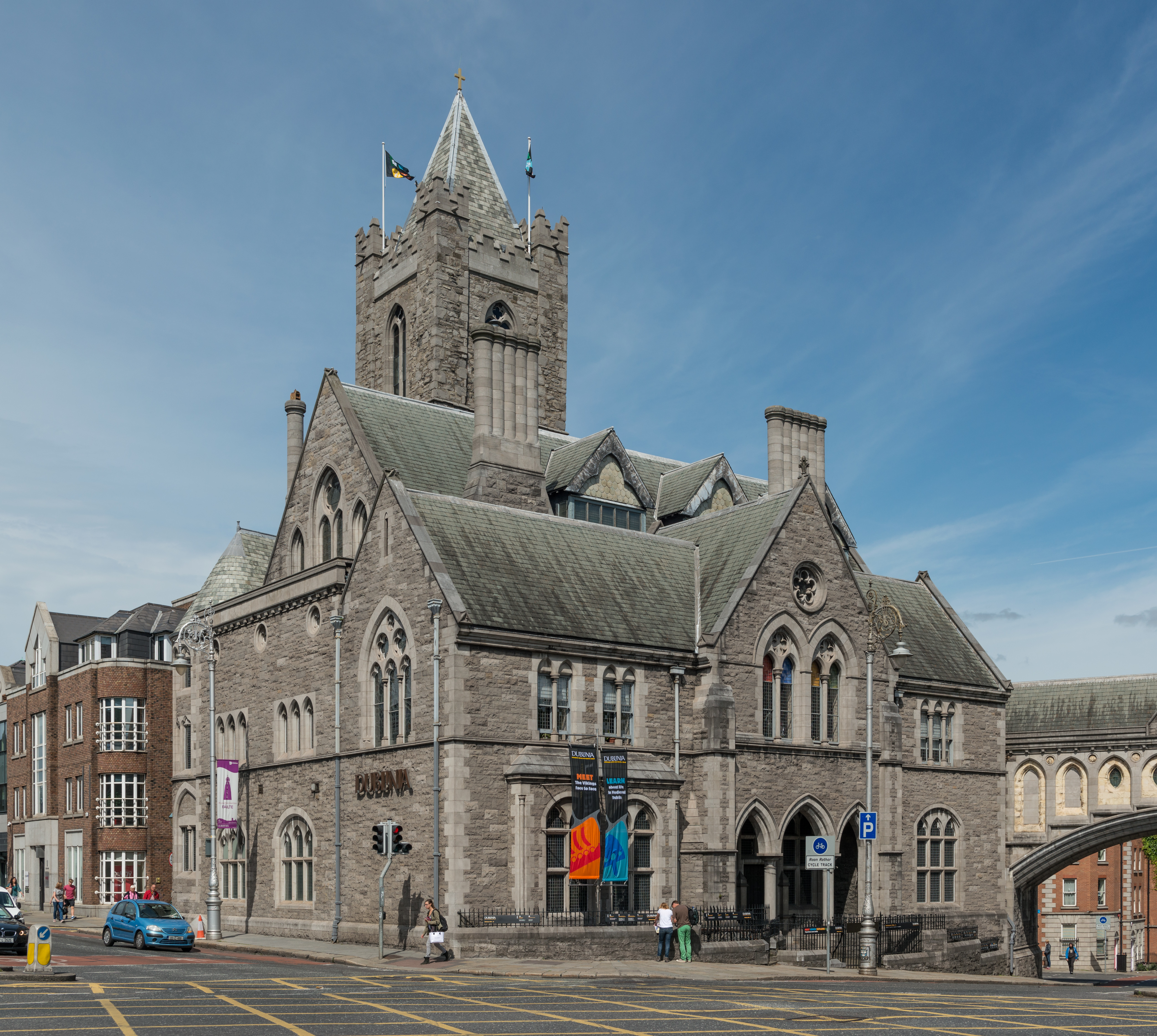
- Synod hall, the building that houses Dublinia

- Location within Central Dublin
- Established: 1993
- Location: St Michael’s Hill, Christ Church, Dublin, Ireland
- Coordinates: 53.343333°N 6.272222°W
- Type: Vikings
- Website: dublinia.ie

Dublinia is a historical recreation (or living history) museum and visitor attraction in Dublin, Ireland, focusing on the Viking and Medieval history of the city. Dublinia is located in a part of Dublin's Christ Church Cathedral, known as the Synod hall.

Dublinia features historical reenactment, with actors playing the roles of Vikings and Medieval Dubliners (in full costume) and encourages visitors to join in. It has recreations of Viking and Medieval-era buildings (houses, etc) and street scenes.

The exhibition was opened in 1993, and was redeveloped in 2010 at a cost of €2 million. As of 2010, the museum was attracting over 125,000 visitors per annum.

== See also ==
- History of Dublin
- Early Scandinavian Dublin
- Jorvik Viking Centre (similar attraction in York)
