= List of mayors of Dublin =

The Lord Mayor of Dublin is the head of Dublin City Council and first citizen of Dublin. The title was created in 1229 as Mayor of Dublin. It was elevated to Lord Mayor in 1665. The date of the election is the end of June, and the term of office is one year.

== Mayors of Dublin ==
=== 13th century ===
Year	Name
1229–1230	Richard Muton
1230–1231	Henry de Exeter
1231–1232	Thomas de la Corner
1232–1233	Robert Pollard
1233–1234	Gilbert de Lyvet
1234–1235	Robert Owain
1235–1237	Gilbert de Lyvet
1237–1238	Elias Burel
1238–1240	Robert Pollard
1240–1241	Henry de Exeter
1241–1242	William Flamstede
1242–1243	John Le Warre
1243–1244	Philip de Dureham
1244–1245	John Le Warre
1245–1246	Roger Owen
1246–1249	John Le Warre
1249–1250	Roger Oeyn
1250–1252	Elias Burel
1252–1256	John Le Warre
1256–1257	Richard Olaf
1257–1258	Sir John Le Warre
1258–1259	Peter Abraham
1259–1260	Elias Burel
1260–1261	Thomas de Winchester
1261–1263	Roger de Asshebourne
1263–1264	Thomas de Winchester
1264–1265	Vincent Taverner
1265–1267	Thomas de Winchester
1267–1268	Vincent Taverner
1268–1269	Roger Asshebourne
1269–1270	Vincent Taverner
1270–1271	Thomas de Winchester
1271–1272	William de Bristol
1272–1275	John Garget
1275–1276	City in King's Hands
1276–1277	Walter Unred
1277–1279	David de Callan
1279–1280	Henry Le Mareschall
1280–1283	David de Callan
1283–1286	Walter Unred
1286–1288	Thomas de Coventry
1288–1292	William de Bristol
1292–1294	Robert de Bray
1294–1295	John Le Seriaunt
1295–1296	Robert de Wyleby
1296–1299	Thomas Coyls
1299–1301	John Le Seriaunt

=== 14th century ===
Year	Name
1301–1302	City in King's Hands
1302–1302	John Le Decer
1303–1303	Geoffrey de Morton
1304–1304	John Le Seriaunt
1305–1305	John Le Decer
1306–1306	John Le Seriaunt
1307–1309	John Le Decer
1309–1310	Robert de Nottingham
1310–1311	John Seriaunt
1311–1314	Richard Lawles
1314–1315	Robert de Nottingham
1315–1316	Richard Lawles
1316–1319	Robert de Nottingham
1319–1320	Robert de Meones
1320–1322	Robert de Nottingham
1322–1324	William Douce
1324–1326	John Le Decer
1326–1327	Robert Le Tanner
1327–1328	William Le Mareschal
1328–1329	Robert Tanner
1329–1330	Philip Cradok
1330–1331	William Douce
1331–1332	John de Meones
1332–1333	William Beydyn, or Boydiff
1333–1334	Geoffrey Cromp
1334–1335	William Beyden, or Boydiff
1335–1336	John de Meones
1336–1337	Philip Cradok
1337–1338	John de Meones
1338–1339	Robert Le Tanner
1339–1341	Kenewrek Scherman
1341–1347	John Le Seriaunt
1347–1348	Geoffrey Crompe
1348–1349	Kenewrek Scherman
1349–1350	Geoffrey Crompe
1349–1350	John Seriaunt
1350–1351	John Bathe
1351–1352	Robert de Moenes
1352–1353	Adam Louestoc
1353–1356	John Seriaunt
1356–1357	Robert Burnell
1357–1358	Peter Barfot
1358–1359	John Taylor
1359–1361	Peter Berfot
1361–1362	Richard Heygrewe
1362–1364	John Beke
1364–1365	David Tyrrell
1365–1366	Richard Heygrewe
1366–1367	David Tyrrell
1367–1368	Peter Woder
1368–1369	John Wydon
1369–1371	John Passavaunt
1371–1374	John Wydon
1374–1375	Nicholas Seriaunt
1375–1376	Edmund Berle
1376–1378	Nicholas Serivaunt
1378–1379	Robert Stakebold
1379–1380	John Wydon
1380–1382	John Hull
1382–1383	Edmund Berle
1383–1384	Robert Burnell
1384–1385	Roger Bekeford
1385–1386	Edmund Berle
1386–1387	Robert Stackebold
1387–1388	John Bermingham
1388–1389	John Passavaunt
1389–1390	Thomas Mareward
1390–1391	Thomas Cusacke
1391–1392	Richard Chamberlain
1392–1393	John Mareward
1393–1396	Thomas Cusacke
1396–1397	Geoffrey Gallane
1397–1398	Thomas Cusake
1398–1399	Nicholas Fynglas
1399–1400	Ralph Ebbe
1400–1401	Thomas Cusacke

=== 15th century ===
Year	Name
1401–1403	John Drake
1403–1404	Thomas Cusacke
1404–1406	John Drake
1406–1407	Thomas Cusacke
1407–1408	William Wade
1408–1410	Thomas Cusacke
1410–1411	Robert Gallane
1411–1412	John Drake
1412–1413	Thomas Cusake
1413–1414	Luke Dowdall
1414–1416	Thomas Cusacke
1416–1417	Walter Tyrrell
1417–1419	Thomas Cusacke
1419–1420	Walter Tyrrell
1420–1421	Thomas Shorthalls
1421–1422	John Burnell
1422–1423	Thomas Cusacke
1423–1424	John White
1424–1425	Thomas Cusacke
1425–1426	Sir Walter Tyrrell
1426–1427	John Walshe
1427–1429	Thomas Shorthalls
1429–1430	Thomas Cusacke
1430–1432	John White
1432–1433	John Hadsor
1433–1434	Nicholas Woder
1434–1435	Ralph Pembroke
1435–1436	John Kylbery
1436–1437	Robert Chambre
1437–1438	Thomas Newberry
1438–1439	Nicholas Woder
1439–1440	John FitzRobert
1440–1441	Nicholas Woder
1441–1442	Ralph Pembroke
1442–1447	Nicholas Woder
1447–1448	Thomas Newbery
1448–1449	No entry
1449–1451	Sir Robert Burnell
1451–1453	Thomas Newbery
1453–1454	Sir Nicholas Woder
1454–1455	Sir Robert Burnell
1455–1456	Philip Bellewe
1456–1457	John Bennet
1457–1458	Thomas Newbery
1458–1459	Robert Burnell
1459–1460	Thomas Walshe
1460–1461	Thomas Newbery
1461–1462	Sir Robert Burnell
1462–1463	No entry
1463–1465	Sir Thomas Newbery
1465–1466	Simon FitzRery
1466–1467	William Crampe
1467–1469	Thomas Newbery
1469–1470	Arland Ussher
1470–1471	Thomas Walton
1471–1472	Simon FitzRery
1472–1473	John Fyan
1473–1474	John Bellewe
1474–1475	Nicholas Burke
1475–1477	Thomas FitzSimon
1477–1478	Patrick FitzLeones
1478–1479	John Weste
1479–1480	John Fyan
1480–1481	Willian Donewyth
1481–1482	Thomas Mulghan
1482–1483	Patrick FitzLeones
1483–1485	John West
1485–1486	John Serjaunt
1486–1487	Janico Markis
1487–1488	Thomas Meiler
1488–1489	William Tyve (or Tue)
1489–1490	Richard Stanyhurst
1490–1491	John Serjaunt
1491–1492	Thomas Bennet
1492–1493	John Serjaunt
1493	Richard Arlon
1493–1494	John Savage
1494–1495	Patrick FitzLeones
1495–1496	Thomas Birmingham
1496–1497	John Geydon
1497–1498	Thomas Collier
1498–1499	Reginald Talbot
1499–1500	James Barby
1500–1501	Robert Forster

=== 16th century ===
Year	Name
1501–1502	Hugh Talbot
1502–1503	Richard Tyrrell
1503–1504	John Blake
1504–1505	Thomas Newman
1505–1506	Nicholas Hertbard
1506–1507	William English
1507–1508	William Canterell
1508–1509	Thomas Philip
1509–1510	William Blank
1510–1511	Nicholas Roch
1511–1512	Thomas Bermingham
1512–1516	No entry
1516–1517	Christopher Ussher
1517–1523	No entry
1523–1524	Nicholas Queytrot
1524–1525	No entry
1525–1526	Richard Talbot
1526–1527	Walter Ewstas
1527–1530	No entry
1530–1531	Thomas Barbe
1531–1532	John Sarsewell
1532–1533	Nicholas Gaydon
1533–1534	Walter FitzSimon
1534–1535	Robert Shilyngford
1535–1536	Thomas Stephens
1536–1537	John Shilton
1537–1538	John Scuyr
1538–1539	James FitzSymond
1539–1540	Nicholas Bennet
1540–1541	Walter Tyrrell
1541–1542	Nicholas Umfre
1542–1543	Nicholas Stanihurst
1543–1546	No entry
1546–1547	Henry Plunket
1547–1548	Thady Duff
1548–1549	James Hancoke
1549–1550	Richard Fyane
1550–1551	John Money
1551–1552	Michael Penteny
1552–1553	Robert Cusake
1553–1554	Bartholomew Ball
1554–1555	Patrick Sarsfield
1555–1556	Thomas Rogers
1556–1557	John Challoner
1557–1558	John Spenefelde
1558–1559	Robert Golding
1559–1560	Christopher Sedgrave
1560–1561	Thomas FitzSimon
1561–1562	Robert Ussher
1562–1563	Thomas Fininge
1563–1564	Robert Cusake
1564–1565	Richard Fiand
1565–1566	Nicholas FitzSimon
1566–1567	Sir William Sarsfield
1567–1568	John FitzSimon
1568–1569	Michael Bea
1569–1570	Walter Cusake
1570–1571	Henry Brown
1571–1572	Patrick Dowdall
1572–1573	James Bellewe
1573–1574	Christopher Fagan
1574–1575	John Ussher
1575–1576	Patrick Goghe
1576–1577	John Goghe
1577–1578	Giles Allen
1578–1579	Richard Rownswell
1579–1580	Nicholas Duffe
1580–1581	Walter Ball
1581–1582	John Gaydon
1582–1583	Nicholas Ball
1583–1584	John Lennan
1584–1585	Thomas Cosgrave
1585–1586	William Piccott
1586–1587	Richard Rownswell
1587–1588	Richard Fagan
1588–1589	Walter Sedgrave
1589–1590	John Forster
1590–1591	Edmond Devnish
1591–1592	Thomas Smith
1592–1593	Philip Conran
1593–1594	James Janes
1594–1595	Thomas Gerrald
1595–1596	Francis Taylor
1596–1597	Michael Chamberlain
1597–1598	Nicholas Weston
1598–1599	James Bellewe
1599–1600	Gerald Yonge
1600–1601	Nicholas Barran

=== 17th century ===
Year	Name
1601–1602	Matthew Hancocke
1602–1603	John Terrell
1603–1604	William Goughe
1604–1605	John Elliott
1605–1606	John Bryce, or Brice
1606–1607	John Arthore
1607–1608	Nicholas Barran
1608–1609	John Cusacke
1609–1610	Robert Ball
1610–1611	Richard Barrye
1611–1612	Thomas Bushopp
1612–1613	Sir James Carroll
1613–1614	Richard Forster
1614–1616	Sir Richard Browne
1616–1617	John Bennes
1617–1618	Sir James Carroll
1618–1619	John Lany
1619–1620	Richard Forster
1620–1621	Sir Richard Browne
1621–1622	Edward Ball
1622–1623	Richard Wiggett
1623–1624	Thadee Duff
1624–1625	William Bushopp
1625–1626	Sir James Carroll
1626–1627	Thomas Evans
1627–1628	Edward Jans
1628–1629	Ronert Bennett
1629–1630	Christopher Forster
1630–1631	Thomas Evans
1631–1632	George Jones
1632–1633	Robert Bennett
1633–1634	Robert Dixon
1634–1635	Sir James Carroll
1635–1637	Sir Christopher Forster
1637–1638	James Watson
1638–1639	Sir Christopher Forster
1639–1640	Charles Forster
1640–1642	Thomas Wakefield
1642–1647	William Smith
1647–1648	William Bladen
1648–1649	John Pue
1649–1650	Thomas Pemberton
1650	Sankey Sullyard
1650–1651	Raphael Hunt
1651–1652	Richard Tighe
1652–1653	Daniel Hutchinson
1653–1654	John Preston
1654–1655	Thomas Hooke
1655–1656	Richard Tighe
1656–1657	Ridgley Hatfield
1657–1658	Thomas Waterhouse
1658–1659	Peter Wybrants
1659–1660	Robert Deey
1660–1661	Hubert Adryan Verneer
1661–1662	George Gilbert
1662–1663	John Cranwell
1663–1665	William Smyth

== Lords Mayor of Dublin ==
In 1665 Sir Daniel Bellingham became the first Lord Mayor of Dublin.

=== 17th century ===
Year	Name
1665–1666	Sir Daniel Bellingham
1666–1667	John Desmynieres
1667–1668	Mark Quin
1668–1669	John Forrest
1669–1670	Lewis Desmynieres
1670–1671	Enoch Reader
1671–1672	Sir John Totty
1672–1673	Robert Deey
1673–1674	Sir Joshua Allen
1674–1675	Sir Francis Brewster
1675–1676	William Smith
1676–1677	Christopher Lovett
1677–1678	John Smith
1678–1679	Peter Ward
1679–1680	John Eastwood
1680–1681	Luke Lowther
1681–1683	Sir Humphrey Jervis
1683–1684	Sir Elias Best
1684–1685	Sir Abel Ram
1685–1686	Sir John Knox
1686–1687	Sir John Castleton
1687–1688	Sir Thomas Hackett
1688–1689	Sir Michael Creagh
1689–1690	Terence MacDermott
1690–1691	John Otrington
1691–1693	Sir Michael Mitchell
1693–1694	Sir John Rogerson
1694–1695	George Blackhall
1695–1696	William Watts
1696–1697	Sir William Billington
1697–1698	Bartholomew Van Homrigh
1698–1699	Thomas Quinn
1699–1700	Sir Anthony Percy
1700–1701	Sir Mark Rainsford

=== 18th century ===
Year	Name
1701–1702	Samuel Walton
1702–1703	Thomas Bell
1703–1704	John Page
1704–1705	Sir Francis Stoyte
1705–1706	William Gibbons
1706–1707	Benjamin Burton
1707–1708	John Pearson
1708–1709	Sir William Fownes
1709–1710	Charles Forrest
1710–1711	Sir John Eccles
1711–1712	Ralph Gore
1712–1714	Sir Samuel Cooke
1714–1715	Sir James Barlow
1715–1716	John Stoyte
1716–1717	Thomas Bolton
1717–1718	Anthony Barkey
1718–1719	William Quaill
1719–1720	Thomas Wilkinson
1720–1721	George Forbes
1721–1722	Thomas Curtis
1722–1723	William Dickson
1723–1724	John Porter
1724–1725	John Reyson
1725–1726	Joseph Kane
1726–1727	William Empson
1727–1728	Sir Nathaniel Whitwell
1728–1729	Henry Burrowes
1729	John Page
1729–1730	Sir Peter Verdoen
1730–1731	Nathaniel Pearson
1731–1732	Joseph Nuttall
1732–1733	Humphrey French
1733–1734	Thomas How
1734–1735	Nathaniel Kane
1735–1736	Sir Richard Grattan
1736	George Forbes
1736–1737	Sir James Somerville
1737–1738	William Walker
1738–1739	John Macarroll
1739–1740	Daniel Falkiner
1740–1741	Sir Samuel Cooke
1741–1742	William Aldrich
1742–1743	Gilbert King
1743–1744	David Tew
1744–1745	John Walker
1745–1746	Daniel Cooke
1746–1747	Richard White
1747	William Walker
1747–1748	Sir George Ribton
1748–1749	Robert Ross
1749–1750	John Adamson
1750–1751	Thomas Taylor
1751–1752	John Cooke
1752–1753	Sir Charles Burton
1753–1754	Andrew Murray
1754–1755	Hans Bailie
1755–1756	Percival Hunt
1756–1757	John Forbes
1757–1758	Thomas Meade
1758–1759	Philip Crampton
1759–1760	John Tew
1760–1761	Sir Patrick Hamilton
1761–1762	Sir Timothy Allen
1762–1763	Charles Rossell
1763–1764	William Forbes
1764–1765	Benjamin Geale
1765–1766	Sir James Taylor
1766–1767	Edward Sankey
1767–1768	Francis Fetherston
1768–1769	Benjamin Barton
1769–1770	Sir Thomas Blackhall
1770–1771	George Reynolds
1771–1772	Francis Booker
1772	William Forbes
1772–1773	Richard French
1773–1774	Willoughby Lightburne
1774–1775	Henry Hart
1775–1776	Thomas Emerson
1776–1777	Henry Bevan
1777–1778	William Dunne
1778–1779	Sir Anthony King
1779–1780	James Hamilton
1780–1781	Kilner Swettenham
1781–1782	John Darragh
1782–1783	Nathaniel Warren
1783–1784	Thomas Green
1784–1785	James Horan
1785–1786	James Sheil
1786–1787	George Alcock
1787–1788	William Alexander
1788–1789	John Rose
1789–1790	John Exshaw
1790–1791	Henry Howison
1791–1792	Henry Gore Sankey
1792–1793	John Carleton
1793–1794	William James
1794–1795	Richard Moncrieff
1795–1796	Sir William Worthington
1796–1797	Samuel Reed
1797–1798	Thomas Fleming
1798–1799	Thomas Andrews
1799–1800	John Sutton
1800	John Exshaw
1800–1801	Charles Thorp

=== 19th century ===
==== 1801–1840 ====
Year	Name
1801–1802	Richard Manders
1802–1803	Jacob Poole
1803–1804	Henry Hutton
1804–1805	Meredith Jenkins
1805–1806	James Vance
1806–1807	Joseph Pemberton
1807–1808	Hugh Trevor
1808–1809	Frederick Darley
1809–1810	Sir William Stamer
1810–1811	Nathaniel Hone
1811–1812	William Henry Archer
1812–1813	Abraham Bradley King
1813–1814	John Cash
1814–1815	John Claudius Beresford
1815–1816	Robert Shaw
1816–1817	Mark Bloxham
1817–1818	John Alley
1818–1819	Sir Thomas McKenny
1819–1820	Sir William Stamer
1820–1821	Sir Abraham Bradley King
1821–1822	Sir John Kingston James
1822–1823	John Smith Fleming
1823–1824	Richard Smyth
1824–1825	Drury Jones
1825–1826	Thomas Abbott
1826–1827	Samuel Wilkinson Tyndall
1827–1828	Sir Edmond Nugent
1828–1829	Alexander Montgomery
1829–1830	Jacob West
1830–1831	Sir Robert Harty
1831	Richard Smyth
1831–1832	Sir Thomas Whelan
1832–1833	Charles Palmer Archer
1833–1834	Sir George Whiteford
1834–1835	Arthur Perrin
1835–1836	Arthur Morrison
1836–1837	William Hodges
1837–1838	Samuel Warren
1838–1839	George Hoyte
1839–1840	Sir Nicholas William Brady
1840–1841	Sir John Kingston James

==== 1841–1900 ====
The Municipal Corporations (Ireland) Act 1840 comes into force. Under this Act, all ratepayers with a yearly valuation of £10 could vote in civic elections and sit on the council. Dublin Corporation (now Dublin City Council) becomes the new municipal authority for the city of Dublin. Daniel O'Connell was elected to the new Dublin Corporation and took office as Lord Mayor of Dublin, the first Roman Catholic to be Lord Mayor since 1690.

Year	Name	Party
1841–1842	Daniel O'Connell	Repeal
1842–1843	George Roe	Whig
1844–1845	Sir Timothy O'Brien	Whig
1845–1846	John L. Arabin	Whig
1846–1847	John Keshan	Whig
1847–1848	Michael Staunton	Repeal
1848–1849	Jeremiah Dunne	Repeal
1849–1850	Sir Timothy O'Brien	Whig
1850–1851	John Reynolds	Repeal
1851–1852	Benjamin Guinness	Irish Conservative
1852–1853	John D'Arcy	Whig
1853–1854	Robert Henry Kinahan	Irish Conservative
1854–1855	Sir Edward McDonnell	Liberal
1855–1856	Joseph Boyce	Irish Conservative
1856–1857	Fergus Farrell	Liberal
1857–1858	Richard Atkinson	Irish Conservative
1858–1859	John Campbell	Liberal
1859–1860	James Lambert	Irish Conservative
1860–1861	Redmond Carroll	Liberal
1861–1862	Richard Atkinson	Irish Conservative
1862–1863	Denis Moylan	Liberal
1863–1864	John Prendergast Vereker	Irish Conservative
1864–1865	Peter Paul McSwiney	Liberal
1865–1866	Sir John Barrington	Irish Conservative
1866–1867	James Mackey	Liberal
1867–1868	William Lane-Joynt	Liberal
1868–1870	Sir William Carroll	Irish Conservative
1870–1871	Edward Purton	Irish Conservative
1871	Patrick Bulfin	Irish Conservative
1871–1872	John Campbell	Irish Conservative
1872–1873	Robert Garde Durdin	Irish Conservative
1873–1874	Sir James Mackey	Irish Conservative
1874–1875	Maurice Brooks	Home Rule
1875–1876	Peter Paul McSwiney	Liberal
1876–1877	Sir George Owens	Irish Unionist
1877	Lewis Wormser Harris	Liberal
1877–1879	Hugh Tarpey	Liberal
1879–1880	Sir John Barrington	Irish Conservative
1880–1881	Edmund Dwyer Gray	Home Rule
1881–1882	George Moyers	Irish Conservative
1882–1884	Charles Dawson	Home Rule
1884–1885	William Meagher	Home Rule
1885–1886	John O'Connor	Irish Nationalist
1886–1888	Timothy Daniel Sullivan	Irish Nationalist
1888–1890	Thomas Sexton	Irish Nationalist
1890–1891	Edward Joseph Kennedy	Irish Nationalist
1891–1893	Joseph Meade	Irish Nationalist
1893–1894	James Shanks	Irish Nationalist
1894–1896	Valentine Blake Dillon	Irish Nationalist
1896–1898	Richard F. McCoy	Irish Nationalist
1898–1900	Daniel Tallon	Irish Nationalist
1900–1901	Sir Thomas Pile	Irish Nationalist

1.For a period there was an agreement to alternate the mayor's chair between Tory (Conservative) and Whigs (Liberals, Repealers).

=== 20th century ===
Year	Name	Party
1901–1904	Timothy Harrington	United Irish League
1904–1906	Joseph Hutchinson	United Irish League
1906–1908	Joseph Nannetti	United Irish League
1908–1909	Gerald O'Reilly	Irish Parliamentary
1909–1910	William Coffey	Irish Parliamentary
1910–1911	Michael Doyle	Irish Parliamentary
1911–1912	John J. Farrell	Irish Parliamentary
1912–1915	Lorcan Sherlock	Irish Parliamentary
1915–1917	Sir James Gallagher	Independent
1917–1920	Laurence O'Neill	Independent
1920–1921	Thomas Kelly	Sinn Féin
1921–1924	Laurence O'Neill	Independent
1924–1930	Position suspended	
1930–1939	Alfie Byrne	Independent
1939–1941	Kathleen Clarke	Fianna Fáil
1941–1943	Peadar Doyle	Fine Gael
1943–1945	Martin O'Sullivan	Labour
1945–1946	Peadar Doyle	Fine Gael
1946–1947	John McCann	Fianna Fáil
1947–1948	Patrick Cahill	Fine Gael
1948–1949	John Breen	Labour
1949–1950	Cormac Breathnach	Fianna Fáil
1950–1951	Jack Belton	Fine Gael
1951–1953	Andrew Clarkin	Fianna Fáil
1953–1954	Bernard Butler	Fianna Fáil
1954–1955	Alfie Byrne	Independent
1955–1956	Denis Larkin	Labour
1956–1957	Robert Briscoe	Fianna Fáil
1957–1958	James Carroll	Independent
1958–1959	Catherine Byrne	Fine Gael
1959–1960	Philip Brady	Fianna Fáil
1960–1961	Maurice E. Dockrell	Fine Gael
1961–1962	Robert Briscoe	Fianna Fáil
1962–1963	James O'Keeffe	Fine Gael
1963–1964	Seán Moore	Fianna Fáil
1964–1965	John McCann	Fianna Fáil
1965–1967	Eugene Timmons	Fianna Fáil
1967–1968	Thomas Stafford	Fianna Fáil
1968–1969	Frank Cluskey	Labour
1969–1974	Position suspended	
1974–1975	James O'Keeffe	Fine Gael
1975–1976	Paddy Dunne	Labour
1976–1977	Jim Mitchell	Fine Gael
1977–1978	Michael Collins	Labour
1978–1979	Paddy Belton	Fine Gael
1979–1980	William Cumiskey	Labour
1980–1981	Fergus O'Brien	Fine Gael
1981–1982	Alexis FitzGerald Jnr	Fine Gael
1982–1983	Daniel Browne	Labour
1983–1984	Michael Keating	Fine Gael
1984–1985	Michael O'Halloran	Labour
1985–1986	Jim Tunney	Fianna Fáil
1986–1987	Bertie Ahern	Fianna Fáil
1987–1988	Carmencita Hederman	Independent
1988–1989	Ben Briscoe	Fianna Fáil
1989–1990	Seán Haughey	Fianna Fáil
1990–1991	Michael Donnelly	Fianna Fáil
1991–1992	Seán Kenny	Labour
1992–1993	Gay Mitchell	Fine Gael
1993–1994	Tomás Mac Giolla	Workers' Party
1994–1995	John Gormley	Green
1995–1996	Seán D. Loftus	Independent
1996–1997	Brendan Lynch	Independent
1997–1998	John Stafford	Fianna Fáil
1998–1999	Joe Doyle	Fine Gael
1999–2000	Mary Freehill	Labour

2.Thomas Kelly was unanimously elected as Lord Mayor while being held as a political prisoner in Wormwood Scrubs prison in England.

=== 21st century ===
Year	Image	Name	Party
2000–2001		Maurice Ahern	Fianna Fáil
2001–2002		Michael Mulcahy	Fianna Fáil
2002		Anthony Creevey	Fianna Fáil
2002–2003		Dermot Lacey	Labour
2003–2004		Royston Brady	Fianna Fáil
2004–2005		Michael Conaghan	Labour
2005–2006		Catherine Byrne	Fine Gael
2006–2007		Vincent Jackson	Independent
2007–2008		Paddy Bourke	Labour
2008–2009		Eibhlin Byrne	Fianna Fáil
2009–2010		Emer Costello	Labour
2010–2011		Gerry Breen	Fine Gael
2011–2012		Andrew Montague	Labour
2012–2013		Naoise Ó Muirí	Fine Gael
2013–2014		Oisín Quinn	Labour
2014–2015		Christy Burke	Independent
2015–2016		Críona Ní Dhálaigh	Sinn Féin
2016–2017		Brendan Carr	Labour
2017–2018		Mícheál Mac Donncha	Sinn Féin
2018–2019		Nial Ring	Independent
2019–2020		Paul McAuliffe	Fianna Fáil
2020		Tom Brabazon	Fianna Fáil
2020–2021		Hazel Chu	Green
2021–2022		Alison Gilliland	Labour
2022–2023		Caroline Conroy	Green
2023–2024		Daithí de Róiste	Fianna Fáil
June–Nov. 2024		James Geoghegan	Fine Gael
Dec. 2024–June 2025		Emma Blain	Fine Gael
2025–2026		Ray McAdam	Fine Gael
2026–present		Daryl Barron	Fianna Fáil

== See also ==
- Timeline of Dublin
- Sheriff of Dublin City
- Sheriff of County Dublin
- List of Clerks of the Tholsel

== Sources ==
- Medieval Dublin: The Living City, Howard Clarke, ISBN 0-7165-2459-7, Pages 156–162
