= Exshaw (surname) =

Exshaw is a surname. Notable people with the surname include:

- Charles Exshaw (died 1771), Irish painter and engraver
- John Exshaw (1753–1827), Irish businessman and politician
- William Exshaw (1866–1927), British sailor
