= Dublin Women's Suffrage Association =

Irish women's suffrage organization

- Formation: 1876
- Dissolved: 1919
- Location: Ireland
- Methods: Activism
- Fields: Voting rights

The Dublin Women's Suffrage Association (DSWA), later the Irish Women's Suffrage and Local Government Association (IWSLGA), was a women's suffrage organisation based in Dublin from 1876 to 1919, latterly also campaigning for a greater role for women in local government and public affairs.

== History ==
The association grew from a committee established by Anna Haslam and her husband, Thomas Haslam, after a meeting on 21 February 1872 chaired by the Lord Mayor of Dublin, Sir George Bolster Owens, and addressed by Belfast suffragist Isabella Tod.

The DSWA was formally founded at a meeting on 26 January 1876 in the Exhibition Palace, Earlsfort Terrace (now the National Concert Hall). After the Poor Law Guardians (Ireland) (Women) Act 1896 allowed women to be elected to the boards of guardians of poor law unions, it renamed itself the Dublin Women's Suffrage and Poor Law Guardians' Association; after the Local Government (Ireland) Act 1898 allowed women to serve on local councils, it became the Dublin Women's Suffrage and Local Government Association. It established branches outside Dublin in the 1890s and became the IWSLGA in 1901.

In 1919, after the Representation of the People Act 1918 provided full franchise as local elections and partial franchise at parliamentary elections, the IWSLGA merged with the Irish Women's Association of Citizenship to become the Irish Women Citizens' and Local Government Association, later renamed the Irish Women's Citizens Association, which in 1949 merged into the Irish Housewives Association.

The association confined itself to constitutional, nonsectarian and peaceful methods, and attracted support from both unionist and nationalist suffragists. Its tactics included making friends in parliament, hosting meetings with important speakers, and issuing pamphlets and periodicals. Its first secretaries were Anna Haslam and Miss McDowell. Anna Haslam served as secretary until 1913. In regards to membership, Anna Haslam suggested an annual subscription of one shilling per annum as membership in the association. Other goals included appointing women to positions "such as rate collectors and sanitary inspectors, while always pursuing the association's main objective of the parliamentary vote." Prominent members of the association in the 20th century were Lady Margaret Dockrell, Mary Hayden, and Bridget Dudley Edwards (mother of Robert Dudley Edwards). Prominent supporters included Charles Cameron, Sir Andrew Reed, Willie Redmond MP, and William Field MP. Following the Sex Disqualification (Removal) Act 1919, Lady Dockrell was one of the first women appointed Justice of the Peace.

== Sources ==
- Haslam, Anna (1876–1913). "Minute Book of the Dublin Women's Suffrage Association (DWSA) / Irish Women's Suffrage and Local Government Association (IWSLGA)". National Archives of Ireland.
- O'Neill, Marie (1985). "The Dublin Women's Suffrage Association and Its Successors". Dublin Historical Record. 38 (4): 126–140. ISSN 0012-6861. JSTOR 30100670.
