= Hubert Adryan Verneer =

Mayor of Dublin, Ireland

Sir Hubert Adryan Verneer was Mayor of Dublin from 1660 to 1661.

Adryan was born in Dublin in about 1627 and educated at Trinity College Dublin. He was admitted a Freeman of the City of Dublin in 1648. He assumed the additional name of Verneer and was knighted in 1661.

Civic offices
Preceded by Robert Deey	Mayor of Dublin; 1660–1661	Succeeded by George Gilbert
