= Edward McDonnell =

Edward McDonnell may refer to:

- Edward Orrick McDonnell (1891–1960), American admiral and Medal of Honor recipient
  - USS Edward McDonnell, a frigate in the US Navy
- Edward McDonnell (Irish politician) (1806–1860), Irish businessman and lord mayor of Dublin
