= List of Irish MPs 1420 =

This is a list of members of the Irish House of Commons in 1420.

Name	Constituency	Province and (for boroughs) present-day county	Notes
Geoffry Galvy	Cork City	Munster – County Cork	
John Mithe	Cork City	Munster – County Cork	
Thomas Burton	County Carlow	Leinster	
Stephen Casse	County Carlow	Leinster	
John Mithe	County Cork	Munster	
Thomas Halle	County Cork	Munster	
Stephen Houthe	County Dublin	Leinster	
Richard Tyrelle	County Dublin	Leinster	
Walran Eustace	County Kildare	Leinster	
Richard Barby	County Kildare	Leinster	
David Lowys	County Limerick	Munster	
William Love	County Limerick	Munster	
Bartholomew Verdon	County Louth	Leinster	
Richard Bagot	County Louth	Leinster	
John Bellew	County Meath	Leinster	
Robert Tuyt	County Meath (County of the Cross)	Leinster	
Robert Sexton	Drogheda	Leinster – Counties Louth and Meath	
John Heyne	Drogheda	Leinster – Counties Louth and Meath	
Thomas Shortals	Dublin City	Leinster - County Dublin	
Ralph Pembroke	Dublin City	Leinster - County Dublin	
John Tobyn	Kinsale	Munster – County Cork	
Philip Russelle	Kinsale	Munster – County Cork	
John Spafford	Limerick City	Munster - County Limerick	
Patrick Lang	Limerick City	Munster - County Limerick	
John Euer	Wexford	Leinster - County Wexford	
William Hay	Wexford	Leinster - County Wexford	
