= Mary Hayden =

Irish historian (1862–1942)

- Born: 1862; Dublin, Ireland
- Died: 1942 (aged 79–80); Dublin, Ireland
- Education: Alexandra College; Royal University of Ireland
- Occupations: Historian, Suffragist
- Father: Thomas Hayden
- Relatives: Thomas Crean (cousin)

Mary Teresa Hayden (1862 – 12 July 1942) was an Irish historian, Irish-language activist and campaigner for women's causes.

== Biography ==
Mary Hayden was educated initially at the Dominican College, Eccles Street and then at Alexandra College in Dublin. She attended the Royal University of Ireland where she graduated with a BA (1885) and an MA (1887) in Modern Languages. With Agnes O'Farrelly she campaigned for women's rights in the university.

A campaigner for gender equality and noted as a public speaker, she was a prominent member of the Dublin Women's Suffrage Association. She was a member of the Gaelic League and friends with Padraig Pearse. However, she opposed violence and disapproved of the 1916 Easter Rising.

In 1911 she was elected to the senate of the National University of Ireland and in 1915 was appointed professor of history at University College Dublin, a position she retained until her death. One of her most famous students was Robert Dubley Edwards who was appointed as Professor of Modern Irish History in 1944, and who is widely regarded as the father of archives in Ireland.

Hayden worked with Mary Gwynn to establish the Irish Catholic Women's Suffrage Association (ICWSA) in 1915.

She helped to form the Women's Social and Progressive League as a political party committed to opposing the 1937 Constitution of Ireland and any regressive consequences it would entail. She opposed articles 40, 41, and 45 concerning the status of women.

A biography of Hayden Mary Hayden: Irish Historian and Feminist by Joyce Padbury was published by Arlen House in 2020.

== Publications ==
- Hayden, M.T.; Moonan, G.A. (1927). A Short History of the Irish People. Longmans, Green and Company.
- Diaries of Mary Hayden 1878–1903 edited by Conan Kennedy (National Library of Ireland/Morrigan, 2008)
- The Mysterious Mary H. : A Selection of Writings by Mary Hayden (1862–1942) (Morrigan Books, 2008).
- Hayden, Mary (1913). "Women in the Middle Ages". The Irish Review (Dublin). 3 (30): 282. doi:10.2307/30062954.
