= Peter Paul McSwiney =

Irish politician and businessman (1810–1884

Lord Mayor of Dublin
- In office 1875–1876
- Preceded by: Maurice Brooks
- Succeeded by: Sir George Owens
- In office 1864–1865
- Preceded by: John Prendergast Vereker
- Succeeded by: Sir John Barrington

Personal details
- Born: c. 1810 Cork, Ireland
- Died: 27 February 1884 (aged 73–74) Dublin, Ireland
- Party: Liberal
- Spouse: Anne Lalor
- Children: 9

Peter Paul McSwiney (c. 1810 – 27 February 1884) was an Irish politician and businessman.

He was born in Cork city, son of John McSwiney, part of the prosperous catholic middle class in Cork. In 1852 McSwiney formed a partnership with draper George Delaney to open a store on Sackville Street, Dublin.

He was elected to Dublin Corporation in 1860, and served as Lord Mayor of Dublin from 1864 to 1865, and again from 1875 to 1876.

McSwiney proposed the placing of a statue of Daniel O'Connell (a distant relative) in Sackville Street, and on 8 August 1864 he laid the foundation stone.

Civic offices
Preceded by John Prendergast Vereker	Lord Mayor of Dublin; 1864–1865	Succeeded by Sir John Barrington
Preceded by Maurice Brooks	Lord Mayor of Dublin; 1875–1876	Succeeded by Sir George Owens
