= Robert Henry Kinahan =

Irish politician (1799–1861

Lord Mayor of Dublin
- In office 1853–1854
- Preceded by: John D'Arcy
- Succeeded by: Sir Edward McDonnell

Personal details
- Born: 2 October 1799 Dublin, Ireland
- Died: 29 April 1861 (aged 61) London, England
- Party: Irish Conservative Party
- Spouse: Charlotte Hudson (m. 1822)
- Education: Trinity College Dublin

Robert Henry Kinahan (2 October 1799 – 29 April 1861) was an Irish wine merchant and politician, who served as Justice of the Peace, and Lord Mayor of Dublin.

== Life and work ==
Kinahan was the son of wine merchant Daniel Kinaham and Martha (Paine). He was the fourth son, with one of his elder brothers, Rev. John Kinahan served as rector of Knockbreda, County Down.

He graduated M.A. at Trinity College Dublin, and served as an Alderman, Justice of the Peace, and High Sheriff (1851). He held the office of Lord Mayor of Dublin between 1853 and 1854.

On 11 December 1822, he married Charlotte Hudson in Rathfarnham. Their son Edward Kinahan (1828–1892) was the first Baronet Hudson-Kinahan of Glenville, County Cork. Another daughter, Frances Alicia Kinahan (1824–1909), married London surgeon Armstrong Todd.

Kinahan died in London on 29 April 1861, and was buried at Mount Jerome Cemetery, Dublin.

Civic offices
Preceded by John D'Arcy	Lord Mayor of Dublin; 1853–1854	Succeeded by Sir Edward McDonnell
