= Nicholas Ball (alderman) =

Irish politician, Mayor of Dublin

Nicholas Ball (died 1609) was Lord Mayor of Dublin and MP for Dublin in the Parliament of Ireland. He was from a wealthy Irish merchant family: his father Bartholomew Ball and brother Walter Ball were also mayors of Dublin. Unlike his brother who converted to Anglicanism, he remained a Roman Catholic like his martyred mother, Blessed Margaret Ball. He married Begnet Luttrell and they had three children, Margaret, Jane and Bartholomew. They lived near Kells, County Meath.

Ball was master of the Merchants Guild, sheriff of Dublin City, an alderman of Dublin from 1574 and mayor of Dublin from 1582 to 1583. As mayor, he tried to have his aged mother released from Dublin Castle, where she had been imprisoned for recusancy on the orders of his brother Walter, but Walter, who seems to have been determined that their mother must die in prison, managed to thwart his efforts and she died, still a prisoner, in 1584. In 1585, he was elected to the Irish House of Commons for County Dublin.

He died in 1609 and is buried in St. Audoen's Church, Dublin.

Civic offices
Preceded by John Gaydon	Mayor of Dublin; 1582–1583	Succeeded by John Lennan
