= Patrick FitzLeones =

Mayor of Dublin, Ireland

Patrick FitzLeones (died after 1495) was a wealthy and influential merchant in fifteenth century Dublin, who served three times as Mayor of Dublin.

The FitzLeones were a long-established Dublin family: in 1281 Geoffrey FitzLeones and his wife Johanna assigned the rent from their lands to the Holy Trinity Augustinian Friary. Clement Fitzleones, or Leones, appointed Attorney General for Ireland in 1499, and subsequently King's Serjeant, who died about 1509, may have been Patrick's cousin. A prominent landowning family named FitzLeones in County Meath apparently died out around 1300.

Patrick was Mayor in 1477–78, 1482–83 and 1494–95. His term as Mayor was not free from controversy: in 1491 Dublin Corporation ordered him to hand over the Garter, an ornament attached to the Great Sword of State of Dublin, which had been presented to the citizens of Dublin in 1403 by King Henry IV of England, and which was carried by the Mayor on ceremonial occasions. He had previously been fined for buying silver without paying the required tax of 40 shillings per troy pound, contrary to a statute of 1449.

He was clearly a man of considerable wealth: he acquired a house on High Street, Dublin, in 1473, and a garden nearby. He is listed as one of the leading citizens of Dublin to whom King Edward IV granted the charter for the Baker's Guild (officially named the Guild of St. Clement and St. Anne) in 1478. In 1472 he was one of the lessees from the Dean of St. Patrick's Cathedral, Dublin, of the profits from the prebend of Lusk.

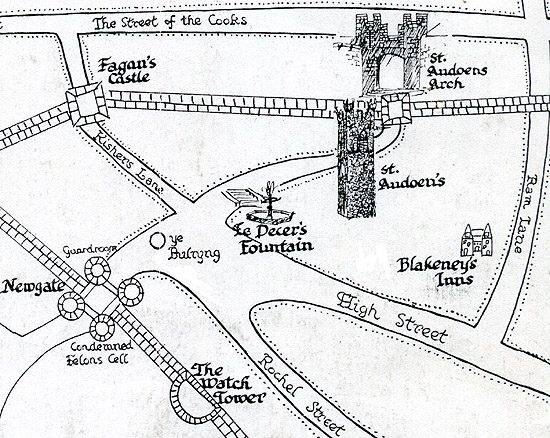
Medieval map of Dublin, showing the city walls and High Street, where Patrick bought a house in 1473

His wife was a member of the prominent Eustace or FitzEustace family, whose head was Baron Portlester. He had one daughter, Margaret, the second wife of John Barnewall, 3rd Baron Trimlestown, Lord Chancellor of Ireland. Trimlestown married four times; six of his seven children, four sons and two daughters, were by Margaret. The sons were Thomas, Peter, James and Andrew: the daughters were Catherine, who married Baron Galtrim, and Elizabeth, who married three times.

== Sources ==
- A Calendar of Irish Chancery Rolls c.1244–1509
- Harris, Walter The History and Antiquities of the City of Dublin from the Earliest Accounts Printed by Laurence Flinn, Castle Street, Dublin 1767
- "Report of the Deputy Keeper of Public Records in Ireland" Vol. 19
- Royal Society of Antiquaries of Ireland Register of Wills and Inventories of the Diocese of Dublin in the time of Archbishops Tregury and Walton 1457–1483; from the original manuscript in Trinity College Dublin edited by Henry F. Berry Dublin 1898
- Proceedings at Meetings of the Royal Archaeological Society; Summer Meeting 13–22 July 1931
