= Margaret Ball =

Lady Mayoress of Dublin and Catholic martyr

Blessed Margaret Ball
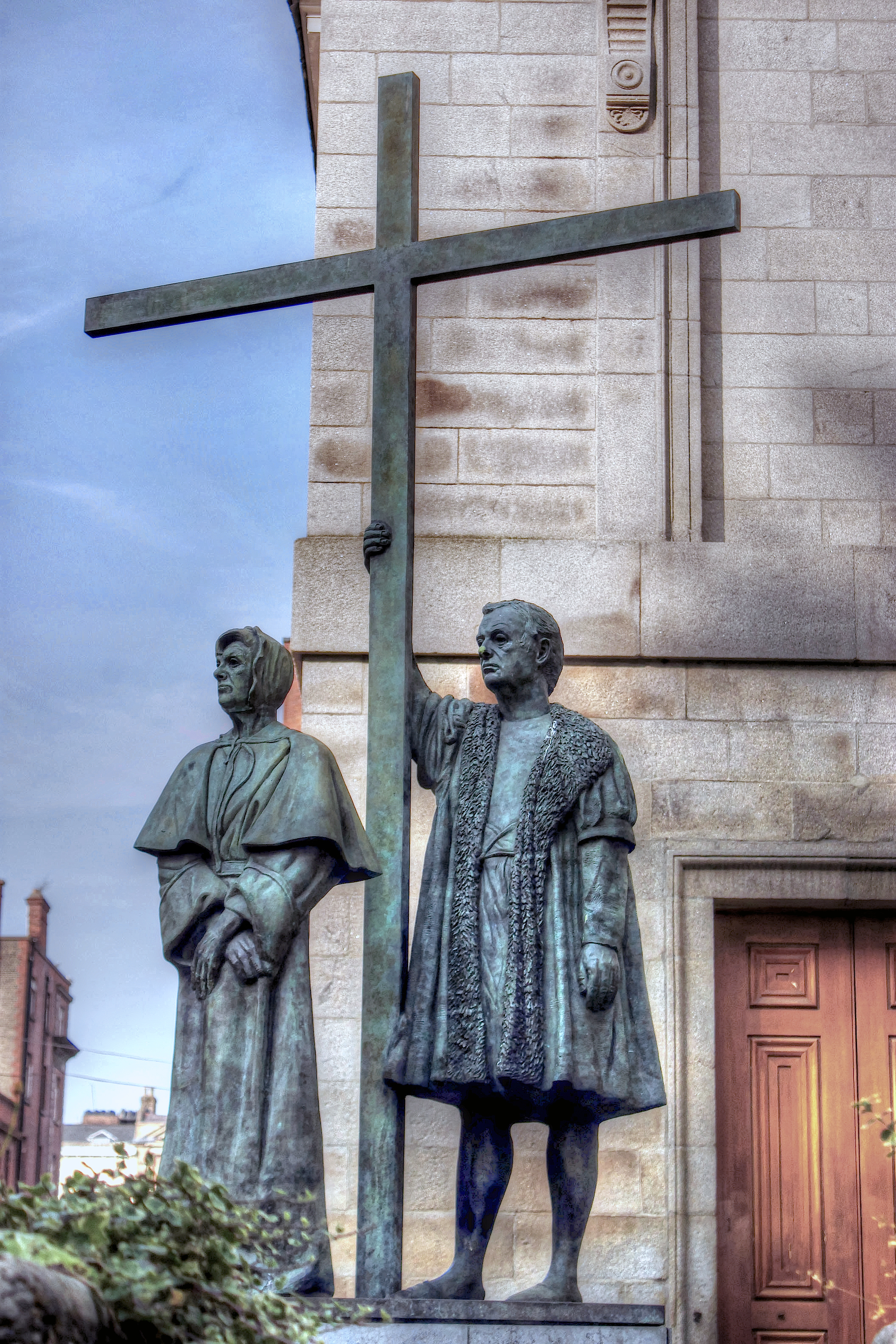
- A statue of the Blessed Margaret Ball and of her grandson-in-law, the Blessed Francis Taylor, which stands in front of St. Mary's Pro-Cathedral, Dublin, Ireland
- Born: 1515; Corballis, County Meath, Ireland
- Died: 1584 (aged 68–69); Dublin Castle, Dublin, Ireland
- Venerated in: Catholic Church
- Beatified: 27 September 1992, Vatican City by Pope John Paul II
- Feast: 20 June

Margaret Ball (1515–1584) was a prominent member of 16th-century Irish society, who, despite being the widow of a Lord Mayor of Dublin, was arrested for her adherence to the Catholic faith and died of deprivation in the dungeons of Dublin Castle. She was declared a martyr for the faith by the Catholic Church and beatified in 1992, one of a group of 17 Irish Catholic Martyrs.

== Early life ==
She was born Margaret Bermingham in Corballis, a townland now part of the village of Skryne in County Meath, where her father, Nicholas, had purchased a farm when he emigrated from England. The family later became politically active; her brother, William Bermingham, protested in London against Earl Thomas Radclyffe, when he imposed the Protestant Reformation on behalf of the boy-king Edward VI. When she was 16 years old, Margaret Bermingham married Bartholomew Ball, an alderman of the City of Dublin, whose wealthy family operated the bridge over the River Dodder, which is still known as Ballsbridge. She then moved to the city, where the couple lived at Ballygall House in north county Dublin and had a townhouse on Merchant's Quay. They had ten children, though only five survived to adulthood. Bartholomew Ball was elected Lord Mayor of Dublin in 1553, making Margaret the Lady Mayoress of the city. She had a comfortable life with a large household and many servants, and she was recognised for organising classes for the children of local families in her home.

== Arrest and death ==
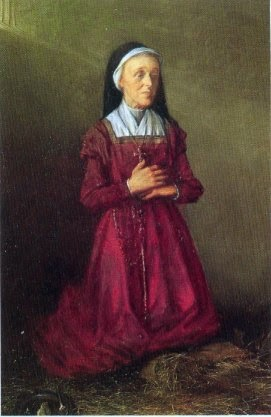
Margaret Ball

In 1558, Queen Elizabeth I reversed the policy of her sister Queen Mary and imposed her Religious Settlement upon all of her realms. In 1570, the Holy See responded with the papal bull Regnans in Excelsis, which declared Elizabeth to be an illegitimate usurper. During this time of religious persecution, it was well known that Ball provided "safe houses" for any bishops or priests who might be passing through Dublin.

Margaret Ball's eldest son, Walter, who wanted to follow in his father's footsteps and advance his political career, embraced the "new religion" and was appointed Commissioner for Ecclesiastical Causes in 1577. Margaret was disappointed with her son's change of faith and tried to change his mind. On one occasion, she told him that she had a "special friend" for him to meet. Walter arrived early with a company of soldiers, and found that the "special friend" was Dermot O'Hurley, Archbishop of Cashel. He was celebrating Mass with the family.

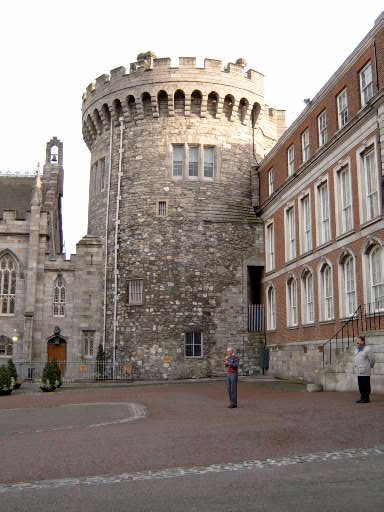
The Record Tower, dating from c.1228, the sole surviving part of Dublin Castle that still appears as it did during the Elizabethan era. To its left is the Chapel Royal.

Immediately after his installation as Lord Mayor of Dublin in 1580, Walter had his mother and her personal chaplain arrested and taken to the dungeons of Dublin Castle. Due to her advanced age and severe arthritis, she had to be transported there by a wooden pallet.

When the family protested, Walter declared that his mother should have been executed, but that he had spared her. She would be allowed to go free if she "took the Oath", which probably referred to the Oath of Supremacy. Her second son, Nicholas, who supported her, was elected Mayor of Dublin in 1582. However, Walter was still Commissioner for Ecclesiastical Causes, which was a royal appointment. He outranked Nicholas and kept him from securing their mother's release from prison. Nicholas visited her daily, bringing her food, clothing and candles.

Ball died in 1584 at the age of 69, which was an advanced age at the time. She was crippled with arthritis and had lived for three years in the cold, wet dungeon of Dublin Castle with no natural light. When she died, she was buried in the cemetery at St. Audoen's Church in Dublin. Although she could have altered her will, she still bequeathed her property to Walter upon her death.

== Veneration ==
Ball had remained in the dungeon when she could have returned to a life of comfort at any time by simply "taking the oath". Two generations later, this pattern was repeated when Blessed Francis Taylor, who was Mayor of Dublin (1595–1596) and was married to Gennet Shelton, a granddaughter of Ball's, was condemned to the dungeons after exposing fraud in the parliamentary elections to the Irish House of Commons. He likewise refused to "take the oath" and died in Dublin Castle in 1621.

Ball and Taylor could not have known each other, but they were beatified together, along with Dermot O'Hurley and 14 other Catholic martyrs, on 27 September 1992 by Pope John Paul II.

== Legacy ==
The Blessed Margaret Ball Chapel in Santry is dedicated to her.

Ball, along with St. Columbanus and St. Mary MacKillop RSJ, was named a patron saint of the 50th International Eucharistic Congress held in Ireland in June 2012.

Her statue stands outside St. Mary's Pro-Cathedral; she is one of only five historical women (excluding Mary, mother of Jesus) to have a public statue in Dublin, the others being Catherine MacAuley (Baggot Street), Veronica Guerin (Dublin Castle), Constance Lloyd (Merrion Square) and Constance Markiewicz (three locations).
