= Anna Haslam =

Irish suffragist (1829–1922

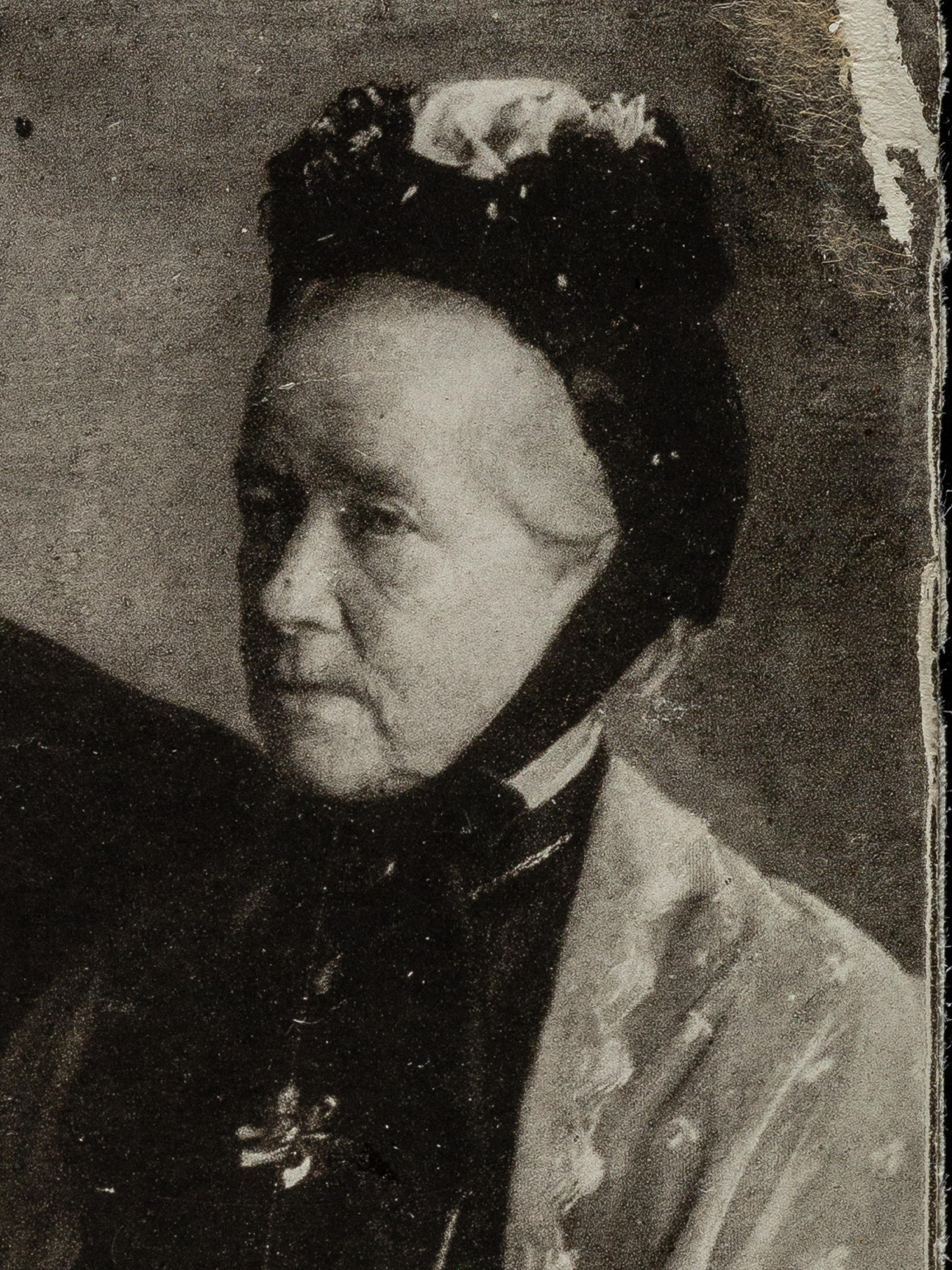

Personal details
- Born: Anna Maria Fisher; 6 April 1829 Youghal, County Cork, Ireland
- Died: 28 November 1922 (aged 93) Dublin, Ireland
- Spouse: Thomas Haslam (m. 1854; died 1917)

Anna Maria Haslam (née Fisher; 6 April 1829 – 28 November 1922) was a suffragist and a major figure in the 19th and early 20th century women's movement in Ireland.

== Early life and family ==
Anna Maria Fisher was born in Youghal, County Cork, Ireland on 6 April 1829. She was born the 16th of 17 children to Jane and Abraham Fisher. The Fishers were a Quaker family with a business in Youghal. They were noted for their charitable works, especially during the Great Famine.

She helped in soup kitchens and became involved in setting up cottage industries for local girls in lace-making, crocheting and knitting. She was brought up believing in equality for men and women and also supporting the campaign against slavery and for temperance and pacifism. She attended Quaker boarding schools, Newtown School, Waterford and Castlegate School in York, which later became The Mount School, York. She then became a teaching assistant in Ackworth School, Yorkshire. She met Thomas Haslam (1826–1917) who was teaching there and who was from Mountmellick, County Laois.

== Anna and Thomas Haslam ==
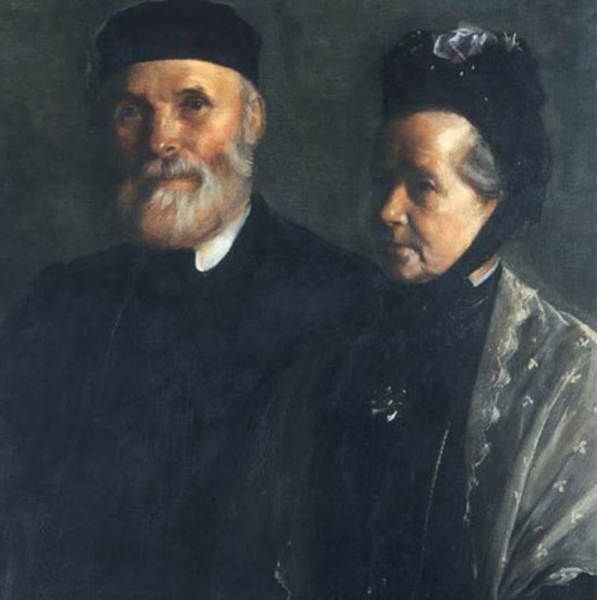
Anna and Thomas Haslam

Anna and Thomas Haslam married on 20 March 1854 in Cork Registry Office. Their marriage was mainly celibate as a result of them not wanting to have children. In later writings Thomas argued in favour of chastity for men. Anna and Thomas Haslam shared a belief in equality for men and women and he supported her campaigns. Thomas Joseph Haslam was born in 1825 to a Quaker family. Thomas was a feminist theorist and from 1868 he wrote about many topics concerning female rights and issues such as prostitution, birth control and women's suffrage.

Both Anna and Thomas were expelled from the Society of Friends due to their interests in social reform but both still maintained links with the community. Thomas was said to have been disowned for harbouring ideas contrary to Quaker teachings. In 1868 Thomas published a pamphlet called "The Marriage Problem", in which he raised and supported the idea of family limitation and outlined a number of contraceptive methods including the safe period.

Thomas Haslam died on 30 January 1917, in his ninety-second year. He and Anna were both buried together in the Quaker burying ground at Temple Hill, Dublin.

== Feminism ==
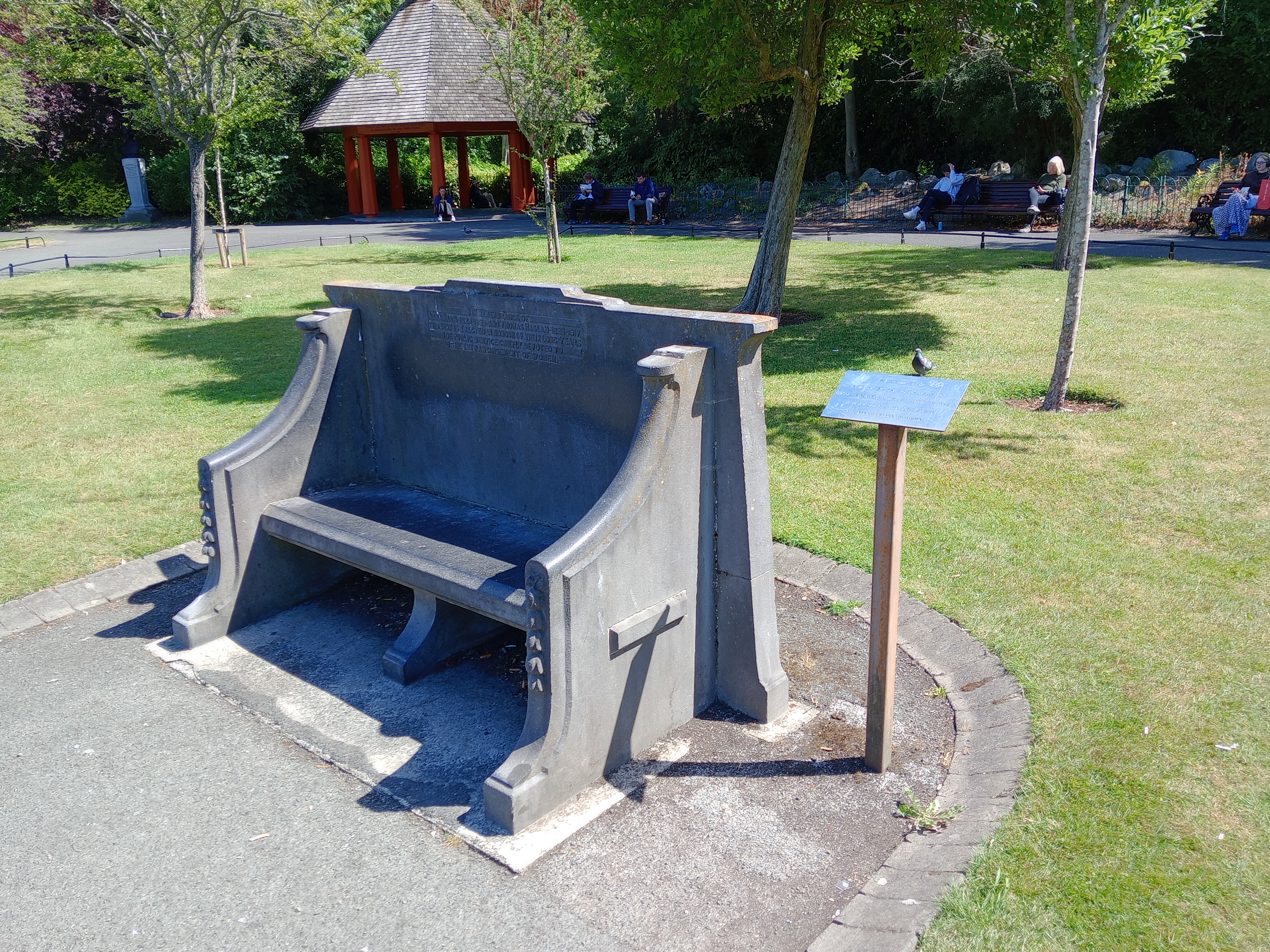
Anna and Thomas Haslam memorial seat in St Stephen's Green, Dublin.

Anna Haslam is best remembered today for her work for votes for women. She was a pioneer in every 19th century Irish feminist campaign and she fought for votes for women from the year 1866. In 1872 she organised the "General Meeting of the members and friends of the Irish Society for Women's Suffrage" in Blackrock, Dublin, which was chaired by George Owens and attended by MPs Maurice Brooks (a Home Ruler) and William Johnston (a northern Orangeman) and by the future Liberal Unionist MP Thomas Spring Rice. Anna and Thomas Haslam were founding members of the Dublin Women's Suffrage Association in 1876. This marked the start of a remarkable campaign in Dublin for votes for women. Haslam, along with the writing of her husband, continued the campaign and in 1896 women in Ireland won the right to be elected as Poor Law Guardians, members of the official bodies which administered the Poor Law. Ireland's early women's rights activists had a close relationship with their English correlatives and shared the same discrimination in education, employment, sexual freedom and political participation. The DWSA organised the introduction of a private member's bill to remove disqualification "by sex or marriage" for election or serving as a poor law guardian. The bill passed in 1896 and the association immediately wrote to the newspapers and published leaflets explaining the process on how register to vote and stand for election and encouraged qualified women to go forward as candidate.

By 1900, there were nearly 100 women guardians. Haslam then led a campaign to encourage qualified women to stand for election in 1898. Women won eligibility to vote in local government elections, and to stand for elections as rural and urban district councillors. In 1913, she stepped down as secretary of the Association and was elected life-president.

== Achievements ==
One of her longest campaigns, working alongside the Belfast suffragist Isabella Tod, was for repeal of the Contagious Diseases Acts of 1864. The acts allowed for state regulation of prostitutes in areas in which the army was stationed. The act permitted compulsory internment of women for up to 3 months, which was later extended to one year. Medical treatment was also enforced on the women. The act sought only to reduce the spread of sexually transmitted diseases amongst the military. She opposed the act as she felt it legitimised prostitution, commoditised women and undermined family life. It was finally repealed following 18 years of campaigning.

Haslam was involved in the 1866 petition and gathered 1,499 signatures to extend suffrage to women as well as men. In 1867 male suffrage was extended but it wasn't until 1911 that the Suffrage movement achieved the significant victory of securing the right of women to stand for election as local councillors.

In 1918, a woman of almost ninety, she went to the polls "surrounded by flowers and flags", with women who united in her honour to celebrate the victory of the vote. This display of unity by activist women from all shades of political opinion acknowledged her role in the fight for the right to vote. The same year in which she died, in 1922, the Irish Free State extended the vote to all men and women over the age of 21.

== Death and posthumous recognition ==
Haslam died on 28 November 1922 at her home in Carlton Terrace, of "cardiac dropsy" aged 93.

A memorial seat to Anna and Thomas Haslam was erected in 1923 in St Stephen's Green, Dublin, with the inscription "in honour of their long years of public service chiefly devoted to the enfranchisement of women."

Her name and picture (and those of 58 other women's suffrage supporters) are on the plinth of the statue of Millicent Fawcett in Parliament Square, London, unveiled in 2018.

== See also ==
- List of suffragists and suffragettes
- List of women's rights activists
- Timeline of women's suffrage
