= Irish Catholic Women's Suffrage Association =

Organisation for women's suffrage, set up in 1915

The Irish Catholic Women's Suffrage Association (ICWSA) was an organisation for women's suffrage which was set up in Dublin in November 1915. The association was established rather late in the struggle for women's suffrage (the Catholic Women's Suffrage Society was formed in the UK in 1911), despite the fact that most of Ireland's population was Catholic. Many also considered it risky to start a suffrage association with the potential of war looming over Ireland. Its founder members included Mary Hayden, a professor of modern Irish history at the University of Dublin and the first female to serve in the senate of the National University of Ireland (1909-1924), and Mrs. Gwynn (wife of Stephen Gwynn) who was the Honorary Secretary of the association. The association was non-party, non-militant, and was established to "organise Catholic women to fight for suffrage," educate public opinion, bring Catholic women to realise the need for the female vote, and do the "common good in the name of Catholicism".

== Meetings ==
When the ICWSA was established, they operated from an office at 15 Ely Place in Dublin, Ireland. Their first meeting was on March 29, 1915 and all following meetings were held every two weeks. The ICWSA began with 60 members, all women, and their numbers steadily increased. In their first meeting, Mrs. Gleeson, an involved member, designed a badge for the group which featured a Celtic symbol in green, blue, and white. Members wore these badges at meetings and at public events. During their meetings, members supplied the afternoon tea which they drink while reading articles "concerning women’s interests". During their meetings Hon. Secretary Mrs. Gwynn and Mrs. Mary Hayden gave speeches on what they had accomplished and what they planned to do in the future. The members of the ICWSA also paired up with other suffrage groups to protest or petition the government.

== Suffrage, temperance, and women’s rights efforts ==
In April 1915 the ICWSA paired up with other suffrage groups to petition the sale of alcohol in Ireland. They wanted the government to place limits on how much alcohol you could purchase. In October, the ICWSA held a public meeting in the Mansion House and gave a lecture on “Women teachers and the Vote”. Later that year, in November, they petitioned to the English and Irish prime minister to “demand inclusion of women” in certain bills and give them the right to vote. In December a member, Mrs. Cantwell, held a meeting at her home, where members could bring a friend or guest to participate or observe. Many of the visitors ended up joining the association. Early in 1916 the ICWSA petitioned the Home Office for the return of a female factory inspector to Ireland. The inspector was the only female inspector in Ireland and had been moved to England. The ICWSA claimed that they wanted her to return in order to “safeguard the rights of Irish factory girls”. Their petition was unsuccessful. That year they also printed two pamphlets called “The Irish Citizen” and “An American Priest on Votes for Women” which they handed out at polling booths during the election in Dublin. These pamphlets discussed why Irish women Should be able to vote.

== End of the ICWSA ==
The ICWSA disbanded between 1916 and 1918 due to women getting the right to vote and the possibility of war (The Irish War of Independence).

“Looking back over the past year we are greatly encouraged by what has been accomplished. Looking forward we see far more to be done for when this calamitous war is over we must be prepared for our responsibility and claim our right to help in reconstructing dislocated social conditions.” - Hon. Secretary Mrs. Stephen Gwynn.

== See also ==
- List of suffragists and suffragettes
- List of women's rights activists
- List of women's rights organizations
- Timeline of women's suffrage
- Elections in the Republic of Ireland
- Feminism in the Republic of Ireland
