= Andrew Montague (Irish politician) =

Irish former politician (born 1968)

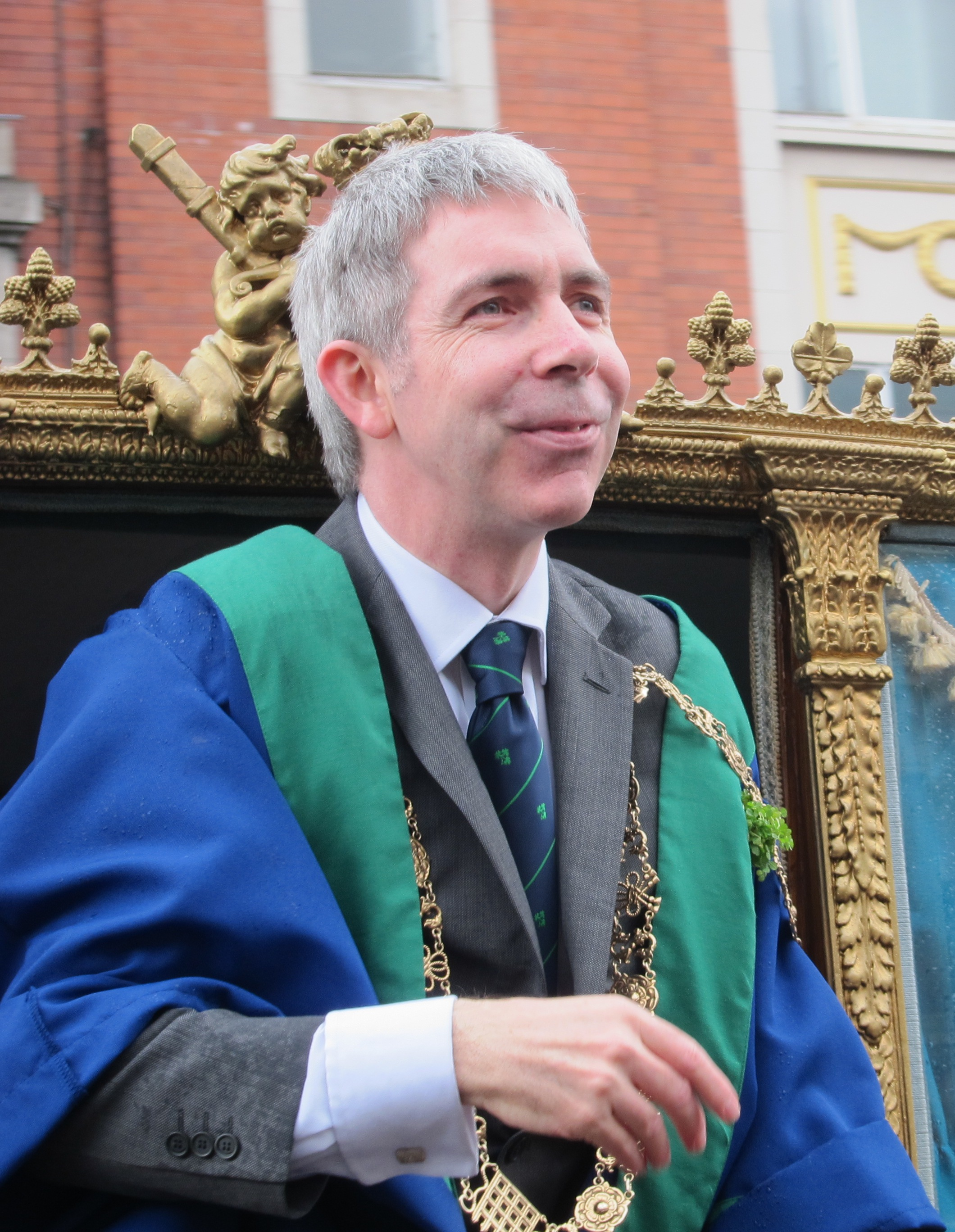
- Montague in 2012

Dublin City Councillor
- In office 24 June 2004 – 26 June 2019
- Constituency: Ballymun

Lord Mayor of Dublin
- In office 5 June 2011 – 6 June 2012
- Preceded by: Gerry Breen
- Succeeded by: Naoise Ó Muirí

Personal details
- Born: 29 February 1968 (age 58) Santry, Dublin, Ireland
- Party: Labour Party
- Education: University College Dublin
- Website: andrewmontague.com

Andrew Montague (born 29 February 1968) is an Irish former Labour Party politician who served as Lord Mayor of Dublin from 2011 to 2012 and a Dublin City Councillor from 2004 to 2019.

Born in Santry, Dublin, he attended Larkhill B.N.S, and St Aidan's C.B.S. before going to University College Dublin where he studied Veterinary Science.

He was first elected to Dublin City Council at the 2004 local elections as a member for the Ballymun-Whitehall local electoral area. He was re-elected in June 2009 for the redrawn local electoral area of Artane-Whitehall.

He proposed the Dublin Bike Scheme in 2004 which was launched in 2009 and credited as one of the most successful public bike schemes in Europe.

He was elected Lord Mayor of Dublin in June 2011 with 29 votes from the Labour Party and Fine Gael, beating the independent Ciarán Perry by 10 votes and Sinn Féin's Larry O'Toole by five votes.

He was elected as a councillor for the Ballymun local electoral area in the 2014 local elections. He lost his seat at the 2019 local elections. He was an unsuccessful candidate for the Dublin North-West constituency at the 2020 general election.

Civic offices
Preceded by Gerry Breen	Lord Mayor of Dublin; 2011–2012	Succeeded by Naoise Ó Muirí
