= Christopher Forster =

Sir Christopher Forster (c. 1590 – c. 1660) was an Anglo-Irish merchant who served several terms as Mayor of Dublin.

In 1621, Forster was Sheriff of Dublin City, having become an alderman of the city. He served as Mayor of Dublin from 1629 to 1630, 1635 to 1637, and 1638 to1639. In 1642, his name appears among those Dublin aldermen who were commissioned by Charles I of England to disarm Roman Catholics in the city during the Irish Confederate Wars. He was the Master of the Dublin Guild of Merchants from 1647 to 1649.

Civic offices
Preceded by Ronert Bennett	Mayor of Dublin; 1629–1630	Succeeded by Thomas Evans
Preceded by Sir James Carroll	Mayor of Dublin; 1634–1635	Succeeded by James Watson
Preceded by James Watson	Mayor of Dublin; 1638–1639	Succeeded by Charles Forster
