= Hugh Tarpey =

Irish politician

Lord Mayor of Dublin
- In office 1877–1879
- Preceded by: Sir George Owens
- Succeeded by: John Barrington

Personal details
- Born: 1821 County Clare, Ireland
- Died: 3 January 1898 (aged 76–77) Dublin, Ireland
- Party: Irish Liberal Party
- Children: 1

Hugh Tarpey (1821 – 3 January 1898) was a leading member of the Irish Liberal Party and a supporter of the campaign for Irish home rule. He served as Lord Mayor of Dublin in 1877 and 1878, High Sheriff of Dublin and as a Justice of the Peace in County Clare.

Tarpey was born in Clarecastle, County Clare, in 1821. He was elected as an alderman in Dublin Corporation for the Royal Exchange ward in 1861, serving until the 1886 local elections. He was an unsuccessful when he ran for the Liberals in Galway Borough.

Hugh Tarpey ran a hotel known as Tarpey's Hotel at 7, 8 and 9 Nassau Street. His townhouse, 51 Upper Mount Street, is now the headquarters of Fine Gael.

He served as Secretary of the Liberal Club.

He died in Tarpey's Hotel in January 1898 and was buried in the O'Connell Circle in Glasnevin Cemetery.

His son, William Bernard Tarpey, also known as William Kingsley Tarpey, was a minor playwright in the late 19th century and early twentieth century.

== Arms ==
Coat of arms of Hugh Tarpey

Notes
Granted 1 August 1876 by Sir John Bernard Burke, Ulster King of Arms.
Crest
Out of a mural crown Gules a demi-eagle displayed Or in the beak a civic crown Proper.
Escutcheon
Azure on a bend engrailed Argent between in chief a castle of the last flammant Proper and in base a rock also Proper three cross crosslets Gules.
Motto
Firm As A Rock

Civic offices
Preceded by Sir George Owens	Lord Mayor of Dublin; 1877–1879	Succeeded by John Barrington
