= John Prendergast Vereker =

Irish lawyer and politician (1822–1891

Lord Mayor of Dublin
- In office 1863–1864
- Preceded by: Denis Moylan
- Succeeded by: Peter Paul McSwiney

Personal details
- Born: April 1822 Dublin, Ireland
- Died: 27 December 1891 (aged 69) Dublin, Ireland
- Party: Irish Conservative Party
- Spouse: Louisa Medlicott (m. 1858)
- Children: 4
- Parent: John Vereker (father)
- Relatives: Gordon Vereker (grandson)
- Education: Trinity College Dublin

John Prendergast Vereker (April 1822 – 27 December 1891) was an Anglo-Irish lawyer and politician. He was the Lord Mayor of Dublin from 1863 to 1864.

John Prendergast Vereker was the second eldest son of John Vereker, 3rd Viscount Gort, from his first marriage to Hon. Maria O'Grady (1791–1854), daughter of Standish O'Grady, 1st Viscount Guillamore.

He graduated from Trinity College Dublin with a Master of Arts degree. Vereker then practiced as a barrister from 1847. He was a member of Dublin Corporation from 1862 to 1883. In 1863 he held the office of Lord Mayor of Dublin. This made Vereker the first practicing barrister to hold this office since Daniel O'Connell in 1841. He was High Sheriff of Dublin in 1878.

On 21 December 1858, he married Louisa Medlicott (died 1906). The marriage resulted in four children, two daughters and two sons.

Civic offices
Preceded by Denis Moylan	Lord Mayor of Dublin; 1863–1864	Succeeded by Peter Paul McSwiney
