= Gerry Breen =

Irish politician (born 1957)

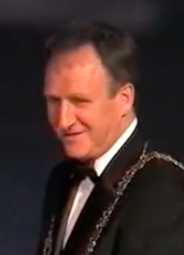
- Breen in 2011

Dublin City Councillor
- In office June 1999 – May 2014
- Constituency: Clontarf

Lord Mayor of Dublin
- In office June 2010 – June 2011
- Preceded by: Emer Costello
- Succeeded by: Andrew Montague

Personal details
- Born: 20 October 1957 (age 68) Dublin, Ireland
- Party: Fine Gael
- Education: University College Dublin

Gerry Breen (born 20 October 1957) is an Irish former Fine Gael politician and Lord Mayor of Dublin.

Born in Clontarf in Dublin, educated at Coláiste Mhuire and University College Dublin (B Comm), Breen first entered politics in 1981 when he joined Fine Gael. At the 1999 local elections, he was elected to Dublin City Council representing the five seat Clontarf local electoral area. He served as Fine Gael group leader on the council from 2004 until 2010.

Elected as Lord Mayor of Dublin in June 2010, he campaigned to have a greater distribution of drug maintenance treatment out of Dublin city centre and into the suburbs and also called for anti-begging laws to be introduced.

He ran at the 2011 general election for Dublin North-West; although he was not resident in the constituency, he obtained 2,988 votes (9.1%). He was not elected, being beaten for the last seat by Labour Party candidate John Lyons by 2,000 votes.

He was a member of the European Committee of the Regions, and a rapporteur on the European Globalisation Fund for the period 2010 to 2014.

He lost his council seat at the 2014 local elections.

Civic offices
Preceded by Emer Costello	Lord Mayor of Dublin; 2010–2011	Succeeded by Andrew Montague
