= Catherine Byrne (politician, died 1994) =

Irish politician (c.1897–1994)

Lord Mayor of Dublin
- In office June 1958 – June 1959
- Preceded by: James Carroll
- Succeeded by: Philip Brady

Dublin Corporation
- In office 1949–1967

Personal details
- Born: Catherine Fraser c. 1897; Edinburgh, Scotland
- Died: 24 January 1994 (aged 96–97); London, England
- Political party: Fine Gael
- Spouse: Thomas Byrne

Catherine Byrne (née Fraser; c. 1897 – 24 January 1994) was an Irish Fine Gael politician. She was a member of Dublin Corporation from 1949 to 1967, and served as Lord Mayor of Dublin from 1958 to 1959, becoming the second woman to hold the position, and the first woman from Fine Gael.

Originally from Edinburgh, Scotland, Catherine Byrne was married to Thomas Byrne. When he died in 1949, she replaced him on Dublin Corporation. In 1958 she was the Fine Gael candidate for Dublin's Lord Mayor. In autumn 1967, the now 70-year-old left the corporation, by which time she was its only female member, and moved to London, where she lived with her daughters. She did not return to Dublin again until September 1988 when the then Lord Mayor, Ben Briscoe, presented awards to his surviving predecessors to mark the city's millennium.

She died in London on 24 January 1994.

Civic offices
Preceded by James Carroll	Lord Mayor of Dublin; 1962–1963	Succeeded by Philip Brady
