= John D'Arcy (politician) =

Irish politician and businessman (1787–1864

Lord Mayor of Dublin
- In office 1852–1853
- Preceded by: Benjamin Guinness
- Succeeded by: Robert Henry Kinahan

Personal details
- Born: 1787 Dublin, Ireland
- Died: 25 February 1864 (aged 76–77) Dublin, Ireland
- Party: Whig
- Spouse: Eliza Segrave

John D'Arcy (1787 – 25 February 1864) was an Irish businessman and Whig politician, who served as Lord Mayor of Dublin from 1852 to 1853.

John D'Arcy was born in 1787. D'Arcy inherited a small brewery at Bridgefoot Street, and in 1818 purchased the adjoining Anchor Brewery on Usher Street.

He was a member of Dublin Corporation, a Justice of the peace, Deputy lieutenant of County Dublin and in 1852 became Lord Mayor of Dublin.

D'Arcy was married to Eliza Segrave. D'Arcy died on 25 February 1864.

Civic offices
| Preceded by Benjamin Guinness | Lord Mayor of Dublin; 1852–1853 | Succeeded by Robert Henry Kinahan |
