= Walter Ball (alderman) =

Irish politician, Mayor of Dublin (died 1598)

Walter Ball (died 1598) was from a wealthy Irish merchant family. His father Bartholomew Ball, his brother Nicholas Ball and sons Robert Ball and Edward Ball all served as Mayor of Dublin. He married Eleanor Ussher, daughter of Alderman Robert Ussher of Santry and his first wife Margaret FitzJohn. He conformed to the established religion (Anglican) to progress politically, and became Commissioner for Ecclesiastical Causes, imposing the Reformation on Dublin. This led to the conflict with his mother, Margaret Ball, whom he imprisoned for recusancy in Dublin Castle, where she endured conditions of appalling squalor for four years. Despite protests from other family members, especially his brother Nicholas, Walter defended his actions, arguing that he had shown clemency by sparing his mother's life, and that she could free herself by swearing the Oath of Supremacy (although it was almost impossible for a Roman Catholic to do this in good conscience). He remained implacable and during his brother's term as Mayor managed to thwart his efforts to free their mother. Margaret died in prison, and now is venerated as the Blessed Margaret Ball by the Catholic church for being Martyred for her faith.

Elected an Alderman in 1573, he served as mayor of Dublin from 1580 to 1581.

He took great interest in the foundation of Trinity College Dublin, and was one of the collectors for its building. Along with John Terrel and William Usher, they took possession of the land of All Hallows Monastery. He died on 8 December 1598.

His widow remarried Dr. Robert Conway, Master in Chancery, who died in 1602, and then Sir John Elliott, Baron of the Court of Exchequer (Ireland), who outlived her. She died in 1613. Archbishop James Ussher married Phoebe Challoner, a granddaughter of Walter and Eleanor.

Civic offices
Preceded by Nicholas Duffe	Mayor of Dublin; 1580–1581	Succeeded by John Gaydon
