= Edward McDonnell (Irish politician) =

Irish politician and businessman (1806–1860

Lord Mayor of Dublin
- In office 1854–1855
- Preceded by: Robert Henry Kinahan
- Succeeded by: Joseph Boyce

Personal details
- Born: 1806 Dublin, Ireland
- Died: 22 November 1860 (aged 53–54) Dublin, Ireland
- Political party: Liberal
- Spouse: Catharine Costigin (m. 1832)
- Children: 6

Sir Edward McDonnell (1806 – 23 November 1860) was an Irish businessman and Lord Mayor of Dublin.

He was born in Dublin to Dubliners Christopher McDonnel, a merchant and paper manufacturer, and Ann Brennan.

In 1849 he was knighted by George Villiers, 4th Earl of Clarendon, who was then Lord Lieutenant of Ireland, on the opening of the Great Southern and Western Railway trunk line from Dublin to Cork. McDonnell was chairman of the Great Southern and Western Railway Company of Ireland from 1849 to 1860.

He served as a Dublin city councillor from 1843 to 1845, and again from 1853 to 1860. McDonnell was a magistrate and alderman before finally becoming Lord Mayor of Dublin in 1854. As an entrepreneur, McDonnell was mainly active in paper production and trade.

He was married to Catharine Costigin in 1832, and they had six children. He died in November 1860 at the age of 54 in his house in Merrion Square.

== Sources ==
- The London review and weekly journal of politics, literature, art and society. (Vol. 1, July – December 1860)

Civic offices
| Preceded by Robert Henry Kinahan | Lord Mayor of Dublin; 1864–1865 | Succeeded by Joseph Boyce |
