= John Drake (mayor) =

Mayor of Dublin, Ireland

John Drake (died c. 1433) was one of the most celebrated medieval Mayors of Dublin. He was acclaimed by his fellow Dubliners as a hero for his decisive victory over the O'Byrne clan of County Wicklow at the Battle of Bloody Bank in July 1402.

== Background ==
He was a member of the prominent Drake family of Drakerath, County Meath, who were a junior branch of the wealthy English landowning Drake family of Ash, Devon. Sir Francis Drake is sometimes said to have belonged to another branch of the same family, although this has been disputed. John was a close relative, possibly a son, of Richard Drake of Drakerath, who was High Sheriff of Meath in 1385, and he may have been the John Drake who held the same office in 1422 (although some sources say that he had retired into private life by then). Matilda (or Maud) Drake, who married the eminent judge Sir Christopher Bernevall, was also a close relative, possibly a sister, of John. He married Isabella, widow of John Buckland.

He became a merchant in Dublin, and traded with Gascony in corn and wine. He was one of the two bailiffs of Dublin in 1482–83. Despite his prominent position, he had something of a reputation for lawlessness and violent behaviour: in particular, in 1392 he was accused of taking part in a violent assault on the Abbey of Saint Thomas the Martyr (located at present-day North Earl Street in Dublin city centre). Ironically this reputation seems to have increased his public standing, as it was clearly felt that whatever his faults he was the man best suited to lead the people of Dublin (who could be quite aggressive in their dealings with their neighbours) in a crisis.

== Battle of Bloody Bank ==
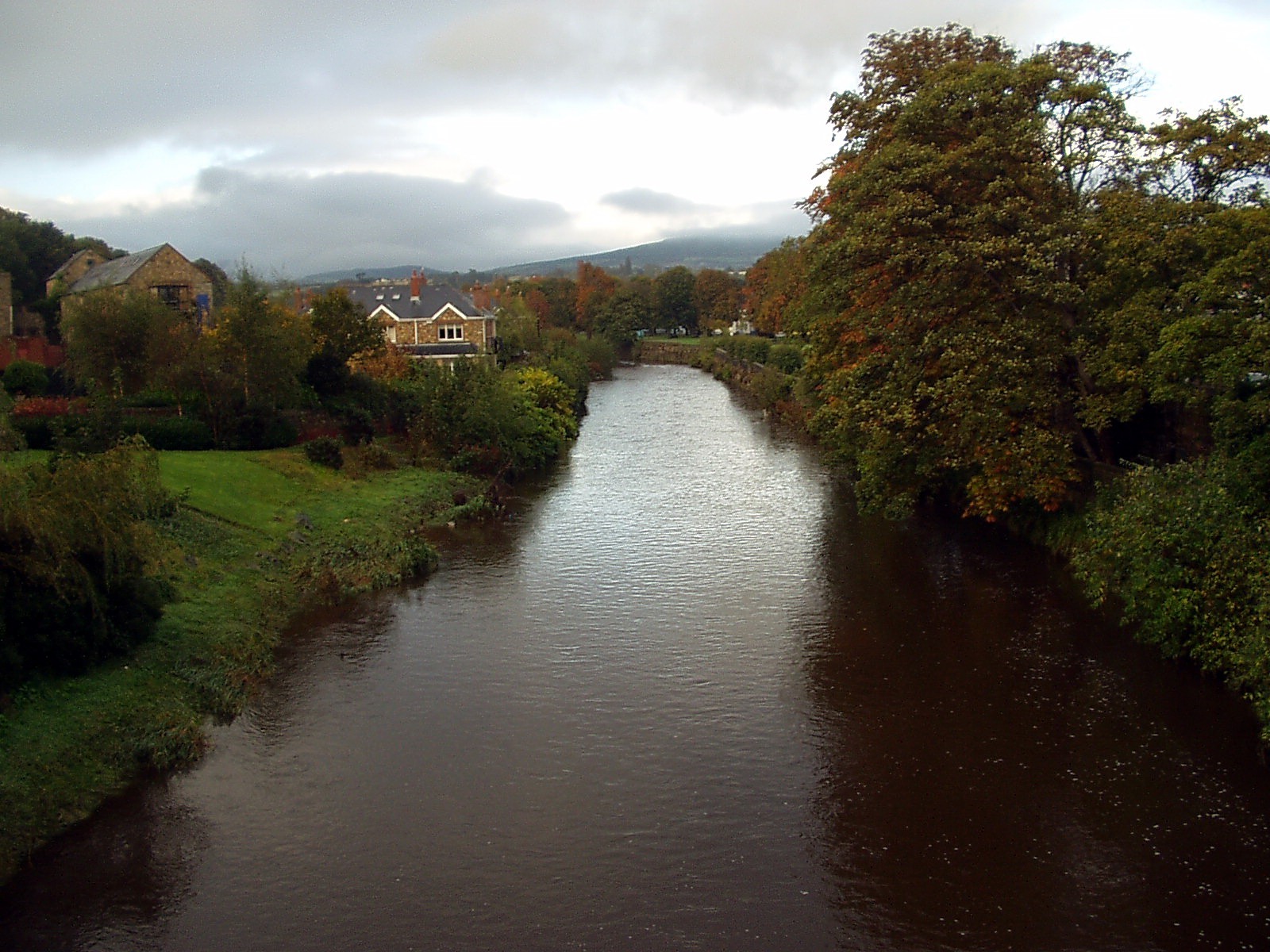
River Dargle, Wicklow, scene of Drake's victory at the Battle of Bloody Bank in 1402

Drake was elected Mayor of Dublin for the first time in 1401. In the summer of the following year the O'Byrnes, who periodically raided Dublin, moved a large force of mercenaries to the banks of the River Dargle at Bray in County Wicklow, about twelve miles south of Dublin city. There they remained for some days: apparently, they were uncertain how to proceed, or they may have been waiting for reinforcements. This fatal hesitation gave the Walsh family, who owned nearby Carrickmines Castle, time to warn the authorities in Dublin of the impending raid.

Drake, who had some military experience, seems to have been given sole power to deal with the emergency (at the time there was a notable lack of experienced military commanders at national level). He acted quickly and decisively: he assembled a large and well-armed force of Dublin citizenry, which he led in person, assisted by the fighting monks of the Order of St. John of Jerusalem, who were based at Kilmainham, west of Dublin city. His forces fell on the mercenary camp at the Dargle, and defeated them with heavy loss of life. The casualties on the O'Byrne side were so high - one estimate puts the death toll on their side at 4000 - that the area became known as Bloody Bank, and was so-called until the nineteenth century. The outcome of the battle did much to enhance the security of Dublin and the Pale (comprising the four counties adjoining Dublin). At the same time, it greatly weakened the power of the O'Byrnes, who were forced to acknowledge the authority of the English Crown, and to surrender the key fortress of Newcastle MacKynegan, near present-day Newcastle, County Wicklow.

== Aftermath and later life ==
Drake's popularity was greatly enhanced by his victory at Bloody Bank, and he served three terms as Mayor in all, finally stepping down in 1412. A thanksgiving ceremony to celebrate his achievements was held at Christchurch Cathedral, Dublin in 1402. Drake was the first Mayor of Dublin to carry the city's ceremonial sword and mace, which were gifts to the people of Dublin from King Henry IV of England. He did not expect a knighthood, as he intended to stand for re-election as Mayor, and by tradition, a knight could not serve as Mayor of Dublin.

As Mayor he was obliged to borrow money, and in 1402 he acknowledged that he owed Thomas Cranley, the Archbishop of Dublin, the sum of 40 marks (a mark being two-thirds of a pound sterling.

He became a substantial landowner in the Donnybrook region of south Dublin, and also held lands at Simmonscourt, now Ballsbridge. His wife died about 1419; John himself may have lived until 1433. In 1422 and again in 1425 he paid for the saying of mass by the monks of Holy Trinity Church for the souls of himself, his parents, his wife Isabella, and her first husband John Buckland. He was a generous benefactor of Holy Trinity, and granted the monks there his lands at Simmonscourt. He is buried in Christchurch Cathedral, Dublin.

== Reputation ==
Although he was a hero to the people of Dublin, Drake was regarded in quite a different light by the O'Byrnes, who maintained that the "battle" at Bloody Bank was actually an unprovoked massacre, since they had not attacked nor intended to attack Dublin (although what else they meant to do with such a large army was never made clear). They did not forget or forgive him: a much later ballad composed by an O'Byrne descendant referred bitterly to Drake as the general who slaughtered hundreds of innocents at the Dargle. The balance of the evidence however is that Drake, though he could be impetuous and violent at times, acted on that occasion in accordance with his duty to keep Dublin safe from attack.

== Bibliography ==
- Ball, F. Elrington The Judges in Ireland 1221-1921 London John Murray 1926
- Harris, Walter The History and Antiquities of the City of Dublin Dublin 1766
- Jones, Randolph "Dublin's Great Civic Sword, Mayor John Drake and his victory near Bray in 1402" Dublin Historical Record Vol.60 Spring 2007 pp. 44–53
- O'Byrne, Dr Emmett "O'Byrne promised to be loyal to the King" Irish Independent 18/04/2012
