= Bartholomew Ball =

Mayor of Dublin, Ireland

Bartholomew Ball (died 1573) was Mayor of Dublin from 1553 to 1554.

He was the son of Thomas Ball and Margaret Birmingham. The Ball family owned lands in Dublin at Ballygall near Glasnevin and operated the bridge over the River Dodder after which Ballsbridge, Dublin, is named.

A merchant, Bartholomew Ball served as high sheriff of Dublin City for 1541–42 before becoming mayor for 1553–54.

He married Margaret Bermingham in 1530 (now the Blessed Margaret Ball) and lived in Ballygall, County Dublin. They had ten children, of whom only five survived. Their sons Walter Ball and Nicholas Ball both served as Mayor of Dublin. On becoming mayor, Walter arrested his aged mother for her Roman Catholic sympathies and incarcerated her in Dublin Castle until her death.

Bartholomew Ball died in 1573, and is buried in St. Audoen's Church, Dublin.

Civic offices
Preceded by Robert Cusake	Mayor of Dublin; 1553–1554	Succeeded by Patrick Sarsfield
