= John Barrington (Irish politician) =

Irish businessman and politician (1824–1887)

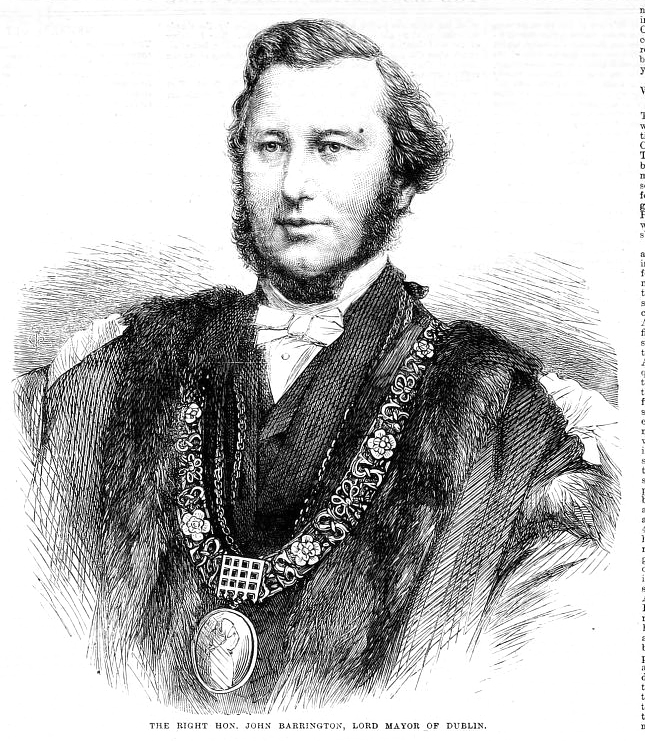
- Barrington in 865

Lord Mayor of Dublin
- In office 1879–1880
- Preceded by: Hugh Tarpey
- Succeeded by: Edmund Dwyer Gray
- In office 1865–1866
- Preceded by: Peter Paul McSwiney
- Succeeded by: James Mackey

Personal details
- Born: 6 September 1824 County Wicklow, Ireland
- Died: 2 May 1887 (aged 62) County Dublin, Ireland
- Party: Irish Conservative Party
- Spouse: Elizabeth Pim (m. 1848)
- Children: 5

Sir John Barrington (6 September 1824 – 2 May 1887), was an Irish businessman who served as Lord Mayor of Dublin in 1865 (the first time a Quaker held the office) and again in 1879. He was a member of the Irish Conservative Party. He was born on 6 September 1824, to Edward Barrington of Fassaroe, County Wicklow, and Sarah Leadbeater from Ballitore, County Kildare. He was the great-grandson of John Barrington, a tallow candler who founded the John Barrington & Sons company that made soap at their premises on Great Britain St. (now Parnell St.

In 1848, he married Elizabeth Pim (1820–1900), the daughter of Jonathan Pim and Elizabeth Goff, at the Quaker Meeting House, Monkstown, Dublin. They had five children: Edward, Eliza Jane, Sarah, John Henry and Jonathan Pim Barrington.

While serving as Lord Mayor in 1865, he entertained Prince Albert. Barrington was knighted for his service following this visit. In 1879 he presented the US President Ulysses S. Grant with the freedom of Dublin.

Barrington was a member of the Royal Horticultural Society and the Royal Dublin Society. He was a director of the Irish Mining Company and the Dublin Commercial Gas Company.

Barrington and his wife lived in St. Anne's and later Santa Severina (now Summerhill), in Killiney, County Dublin.

He died on 2 May 1887, and is buried in the Friends Burial Ground in Blackrock, Dublin.

== Arms ==
Coat of arms of John Barrington

Notes
Confirmed by John Bernard Burke, Ulster King of Arms, 3 January 1865.
Crest
On a wreath of the colours a mural crown Proper out of which a hermit's bust in profile vested paly Argent and Gules and having on the head a cowl also paly Argent and Gules.
Escutcheon
Argent three chevronels Gules in base a civic crown Proper on a chief of the second a castle of the first flammant.
Motto
Honesta Quam Splendida

Civic offices
Preceded by Peter Paul McSwiney	Lord Mayor of Dublin; 1865–1866	Succeeded by James Mackey
Preceded by Hugh Tarpey	Lord Mayor of Dublin; 1879–1880	Succeeded by Edmund Dwyer Gray
