= Charles Exshaw =

Irish painter and engraver

- Born: 1715? Tymon, County Dublin
- Died: 1771 (aged 55–56)
- Occupations: Painter, art dealer, and engraver
- Relatives: John Exshaw (nephew)

Charles Exshaw (1715?–1771) was an Irish painter, art dealer, and engraver.

== Early life and family ==
Exshaw was born in Tymon, County Dublin around 1715. His parents were merchant John (died 1746) and his wife Thomasina (née Barry). Exshaw had a sister, Mary, and 3 brothers, his twin, James, Edward, who was an editor and publisher of the Dublin Newsletter, and John, who established Exshaw's Gentleman's Magazine.

== Career ==
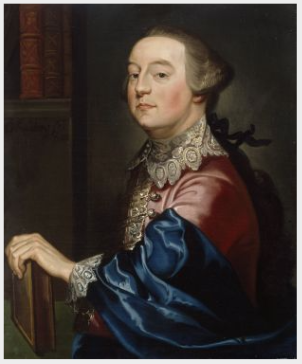
Portrait of a Man by Exshaw (1760) held in the National Gallery of Ireland

Exshaw trained under Dublin based architect and painter, Francis Bindon. Bindon may have encouraged Exshaw to travel and study abroad. He may have won a medal for drawing while in Paris, possibly from the Académie Royale. In 1755, Exshaw returned to Dublin, holding a sale of the sculpture, drawings, and paintings he had collected in Europe on Dame Street in the rooms of Francesco Geminiani. In 1757 he travelled to Paris again as a pupil of Carle Vanloo, and he executed four engravings of that painter's children in a combined method of etching and mezzotint engraving. He then travelled to Rome in 1759, etching the model of Italian painter Carol Maratta from life.

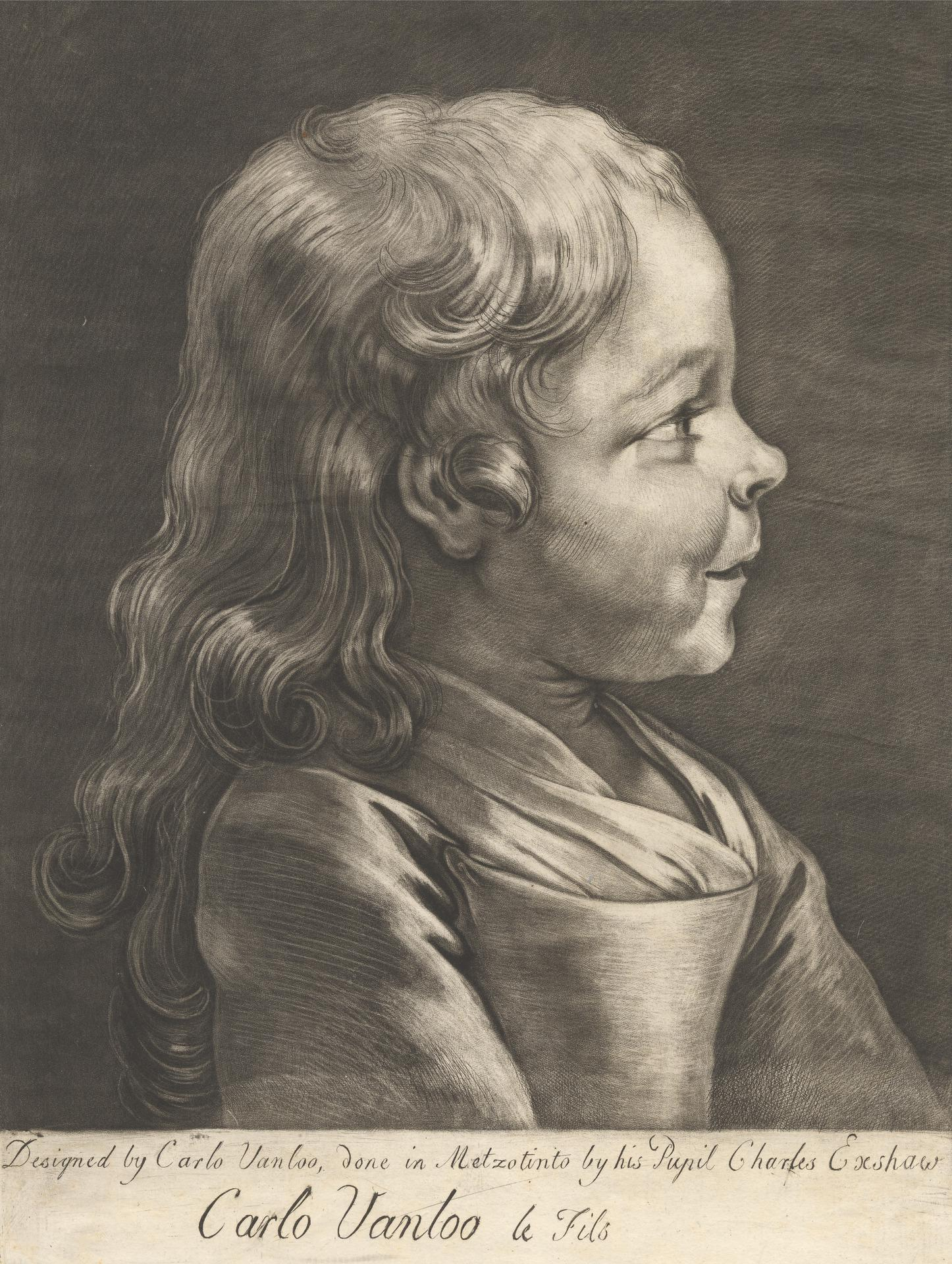
Charles van Loo (1757) mezzotint and etching by Exshaw, held in the Yale Center for British Art

He went on to visit Amsterdam, where he especially studied the works of Rembrandt, and executed two etchings from his pictures, "Potiphar's Wife making Accusation against Joseph" and "Christ with his Disciples at Sea in a Storm", the latter plate being dated 1760. He also executed some etchings and mezzotint engravings of heads of boors and peasants after various Dutch masters, and a mezzotint engraving of 'A Girl with a Basket of Cherries, and Two Boys,' after Rubens.

Returning to Dublin in 1762, he held 2 more sales on 10 February 1762 and in May 1764. He subsequently settled in London in 1762, and unsuccessfully attempted to establish a drawing-school, after the example of the Caracci, in Maiden Lane, Covent Garden. Exshaw was one of the early competitors for the Society of Arts' premium for an historical painting, with a picture of ‘The Black Prince entertaining the captive French Monarch after the Battle of Cressy.’

== Death ==
He died early in 1771, probably in London, and in April of that year his collection of studies and pictures was sold by auction. In 1781, two pictures and drawing of his were exhibited at the Society of British Artists, including a view of Salisbury.
