= Francis Taylor (martyr) =

Irish martyr and mayor of Dublin (1550-1621)

The Blessed Francis Taylor (Irish: Proinnsias Táiliúr)
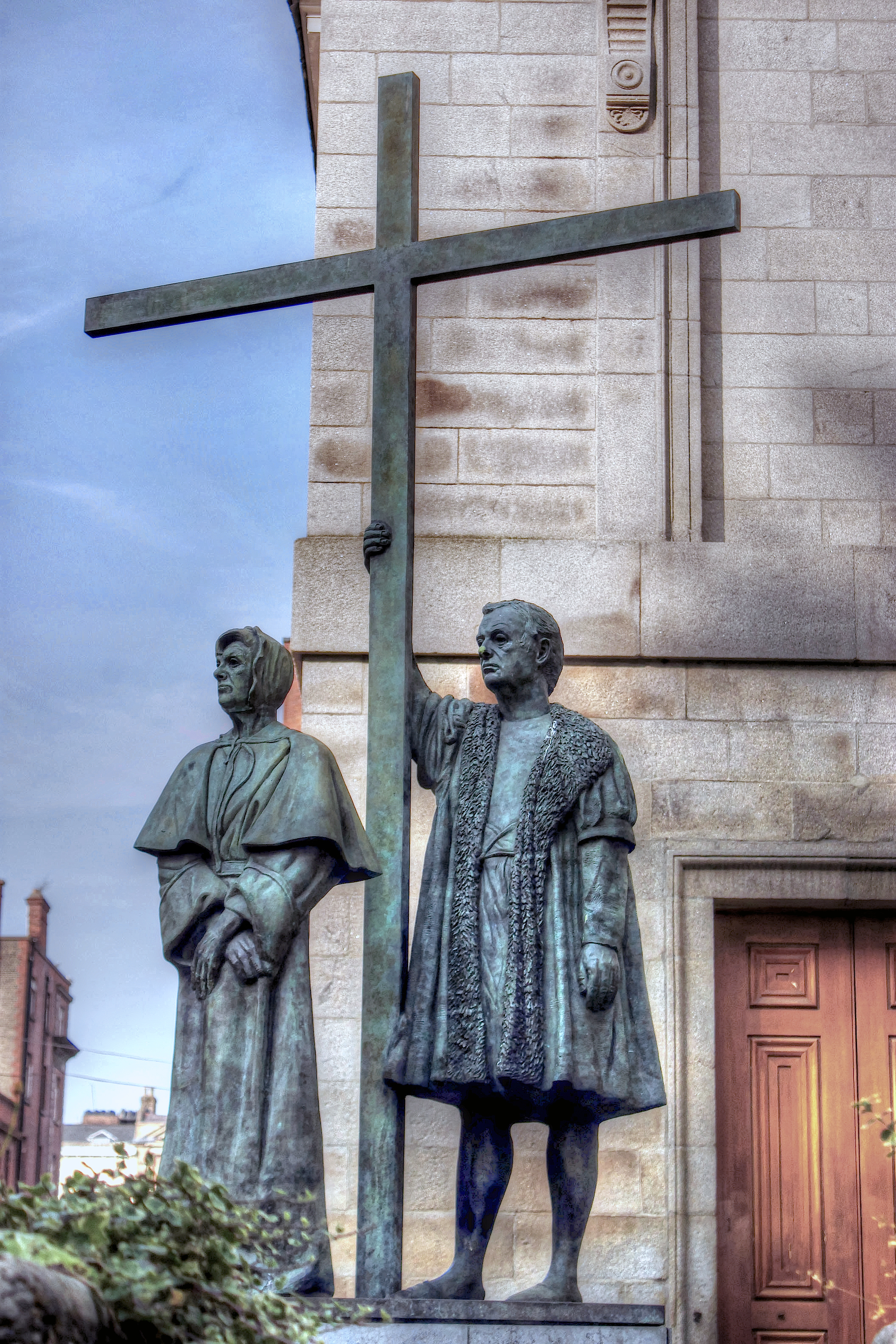
- A statue of the Blessed Francis Taylor and of his grandmother-in-law, the Blessed Margaret Ball, which stands in front of St. Mary's Pro-Cathedral, Dublin, Ireland

Martyr
- Born: 30 January 1550; Swords, County Dublin, Ireland
- Died: 30 January 1621; Dublin Castle, Ireland
- Venerated in: Roman Catholic Church (Ireland)
- Beatified: 27 September 1992, Vatican City by Pope John Paul II
- Feast: 30 January
- Patronage: Politicians

Francis Taylor (Irish: Proinnsias Táiliúr; Beannaithe, Swords, c. 1550 – Dublin, 29 January 1621) was a Mayor of Dublin, Ireland, who was incarcerated because of his Catholicism. He has been declared a martyr for his faith and beatified by the Catholic Church.

== Life ==
Born in Swords, County Dublin, Francis Taylor was the second son of wealthy merchant Robert Taylor and his wife Elizabeth Golding. Taylor moved to the City of Dublin and married Gennet Shelton, daughter of a prominent family, being the granddaughter of a Mayor of Dublin. He himself was elected Dublin's mayor in 1595.

In 1613 Taylor was elected an MP elected for Dublin, but the election was rescheduled to allow Protestants to take the seats. He was imprisoned for his Catholic faith around 1614, and died in Dublin Castle on 29 January 1621, after seven years of refusing to accept his freedom by giving up his religion.

== Veneration ==
Pope John Paul II beatified Taylor on 27 September 1992, as part of a group of 17 Irish Catholic Martyrs who were victims of religious persecution due to their Catholic faith during that era.

A statue of Taylor and of his wife's grandmother, the Blessed Margaret Ball, who had died in that same prison for her faith in 1584, stands outside the main entrance of St. Mary's Pro-Cathedral in Dublin.

== See also ==
- Statues in Dublin

Civic offices
Preceded by Thomas Gerrald	Mayor of Dublin; 1595–1596	Succeeded by Michael Chamberlain
