= Ralph Pembroke =

Mayor of Dublin, Ireland

Ralph Pembroke was an Irish municipal official and member of the Irish House of Commons of the fifteenth century.

He was one of the MPs for Dublin City in 1420. He was Mayor of Dublin from 1434 to 1435.
