= Richard Muton =

Irish politician

Richard Muton was an Irish politician.

== Life and work ==
Muton was elected as the first Mayor of Dublin in 1229 following the creation of the office by Henry III.
