= John Exshaw =

Irish business,man and politician (1753–1827

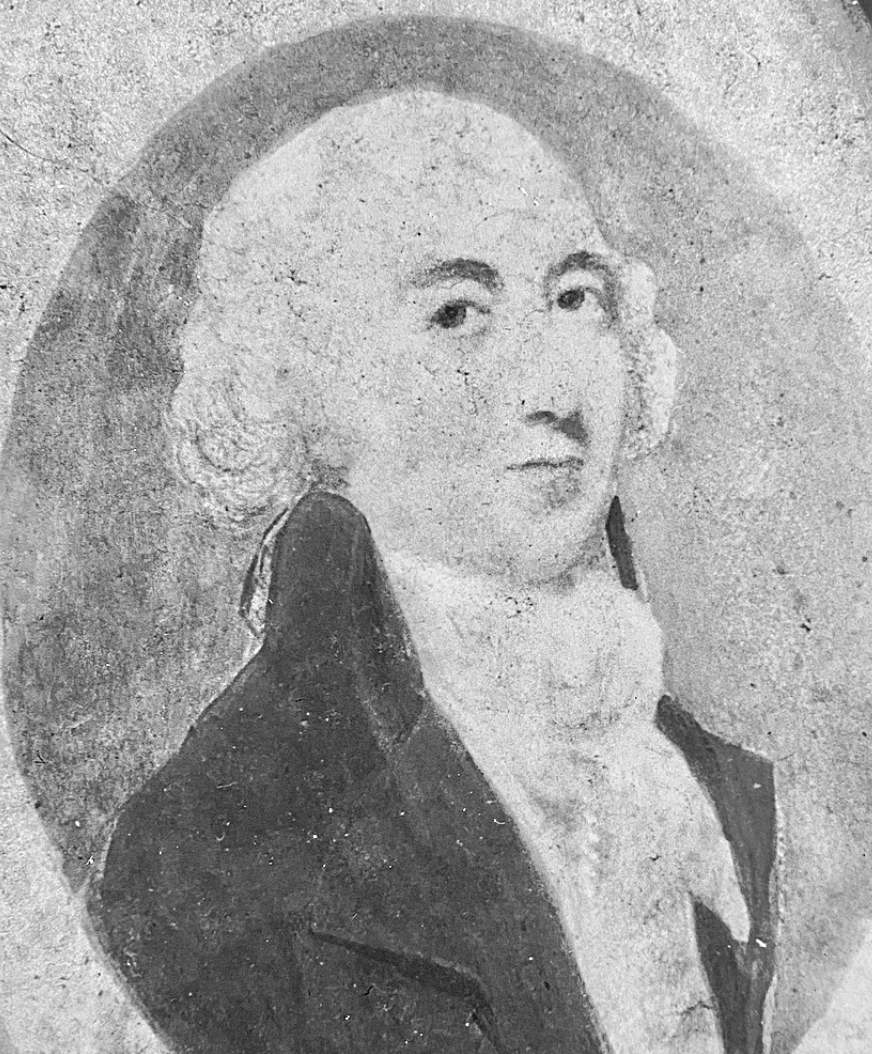
- Exshaw, c. 1800

Lord Mayor of Dublin
- In office February – October 1800
- Preceded by: John Sutton
- Succeeded by: Charles Thorp
- In office 1789–1790
- Preceded by: John Rose
- Succeeded by: Henry Howison

Personal details
- Born: 1753 County Dublin, Ireland
- Died: 6 January 1827 (aged 73–74) County Dublin, Ireland
- Spouses: Angel Wilkinson (m. 1776; died 1787); Thomasine Haffield (m. 1790; died 1804); Hannah Lagrovere (m. 1805; died 1806)
- Children: 11
- Relatives: Charles Exshaw (uncle)

John Exshaw (1753 – 6 January 1827) was an Irish bookseller, printer, civic official and Volunteer commander who served twice as Lord Mayor of Dublin, from 1789 to 1790 and again from February to October 1800. He also served as sheriff, alderman and divisional justice of police in Dublin. During the disturbances of 1797–1798, Exshaw commanded the Stephen's Green Yeomanry and served as adjutant-general of the yeomanry forces in the Dublin district.

== Personal life ==
John Exshaw was born in 1753, the second son of John Exshaw and his first wife, Faith Walker. The Exshaw family had been in the bookselling business since 1732. The foundation for this had been laid by his uncle, Edward Exshaw, and Edward's brother, John Exshaw's father. After his father's death, John Exshaw took over the business and ran it until 1822. His retirement marked the end of his family's bookselling activities.

== Business career ==
He succeeded his father in the book trade as printer, bookseller and stationer in 1776, moving from Dame Street to Grafton Street in 1782. He obtained lucrative contracts with the lottery commissioners (1780), Dublin University Press (1787–1788) and the Post Office (1792).

Among his firm's publications was an edition of the Works of George Berkeley and an edition by Edmund Malone of Shakespeare's Plays and poems (1794). He continued the family's publication of Exshaw's Gentleman's Magazine until 1794. In an obituary he was credited with publication of Hue and Cry, a police gazette, 'emoluments of which are stated to be about £1,000 a year' (Gent. Mag.).

== Political career ==
Exshaw was politically active primarily in Dublin politics. He was a member of the Guild of St. Luke the Evangelist, the guild of cutlers, innkeepers, and stationers founded in 1670, which also represented booksellers.

From 1779 to 1780 he was Sheriff of Dublin City. From 1782 he served as an alderman, and in October of that year he was elected warden of his guild. In 1784 he was elected coroner of the city. From 1786 to 1788, Exshaw was divisional justice of police. Later, after the passage of the Dublin Police Magistrates Act of 1808, he held this post again and remained a magistrate until his death in 1827.

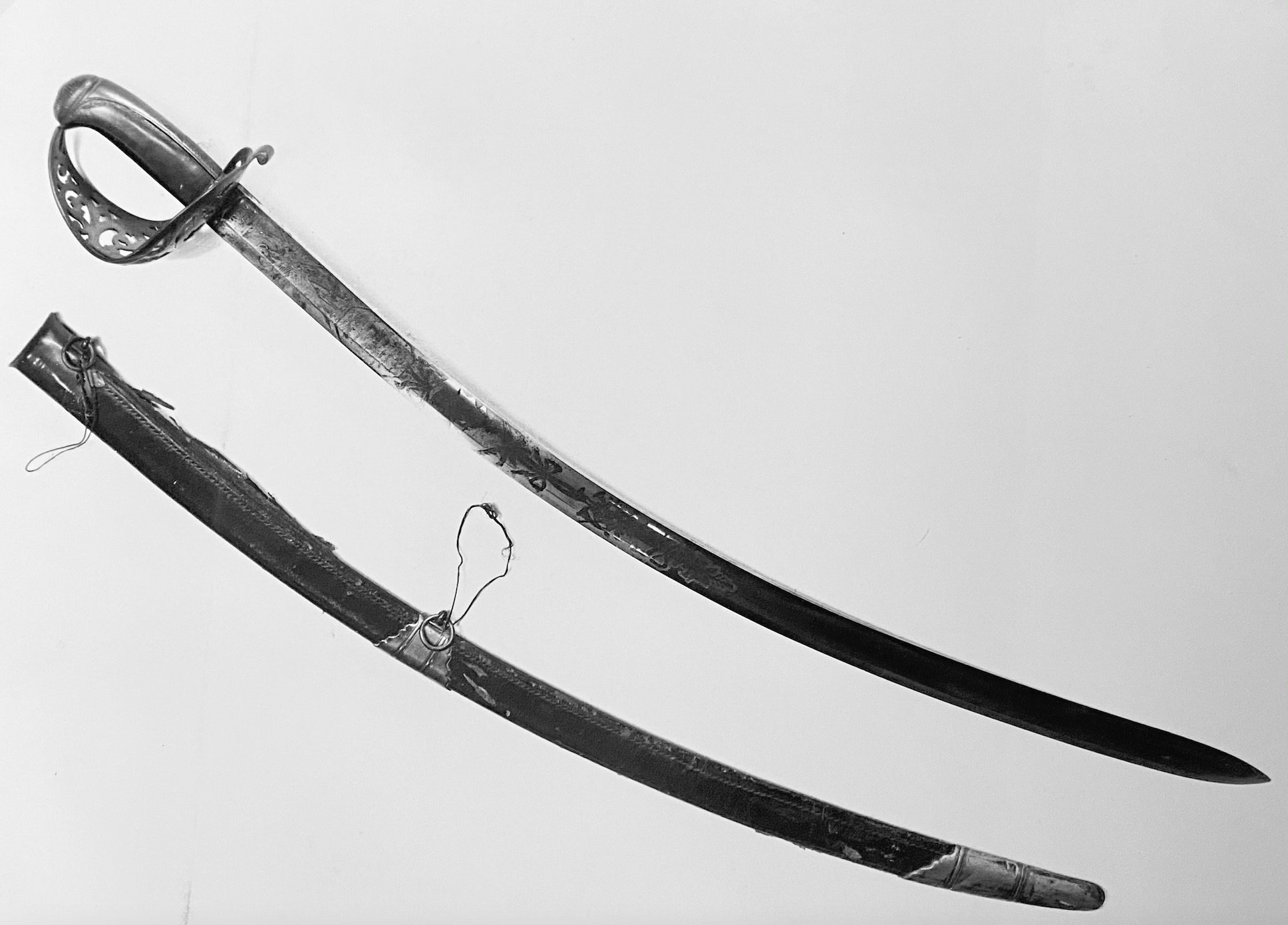
Exshaw's presentation sword

On 8 May 1789, Exshaw was elected Lord Mayor of Dublin. He took office on 16 October 1789, and held the position until October 1790. Also in 1790, he unsuccessfully sought a seat in the Irish parliament. On 24 February 1800, he was re-elected Lord Mayor. The previous incumbent, John Sutton, had died unexpectedly, and Exshaw completed the remainder of his term until October 1800.

Alongside his civic career, Exshaw held a long-standing role in Dublin's volunteer forces, serving as captain commandant of the 1st Regiment of the Royal Dublin Volunteers from 1779 to 1798. In 1797, the non-commissioned officers and privates of the regiment presented him with a ceremonial sabre made by Archer of Dublin, inscribed to "Alderman John Exshaw, their Captain Commandant". During the unrest of the 1790s he also became involved in loyalist defence, joining a mutual defence association at Rathfarnham in 1795 and commanding the St Stephen's Green yeomanry in 1797–1798, during the period immediately preceding and encompassing the Irish Rebellion of 1798.

== Family life and death ==
He lived at Kimmage Manor, Dublin. In May 1776, he married Angel Wilkinson. His wife died in October 1787 at the age of 32. Exshaw married twice more later in life. His second marriage to Thomasine Haffield, produced at least two children. His third marriage, in 1805 to Hannah Lagrovere, resulted in a son born in March 1806. His third wife died in June of the same year.

He is connected to the later Exshaw family in the Bordeaux brandy trade through his brother, Thomas and his descendants. His nephew, also named John Exshaw, settled in Bordeaux and established the John Exshaw Cognac house.

He died in Roebuck on 6 January 1827 at the age of 74 and was buried in St. John's Cemetery in Clondalkin. There he was buried next to his first wife and her two daughters.

Civic offices
Preceded by John Rose	Lord Mayor of Dublin; 1789–1790	Succeeded by Henry Howison
Preceded by John Sutton	Lord Mayor of Dublin; Feb.–Oct. 1800	Succeeded by Charles Thorp
