= George Owens (mayor) =

Anglo-Irish politician (1808–1897)

Lord Mayor of Dublin
- In office 1876–1877
- Preceded by: Peter Paul McSwiney
- Succeeded by: Hugh Tarpey

Personal details
- Born: 1808 Limerick, Ireland
- Died: 1897 (aged 88–89) Dublin, Ireland
- Party: Irish Unionist Alliance
- Spouse: Rebecca Owen (m. 1831)
- Education: University of Glasgow

Sir George Bolster Owens (1808 – 1897) was an Anglo-Irish politician.

Owens was born in New Barracks, Limerick, the son of the barrack master George Owens. He was educated at the University of Glasgow, graduating as a Doctor of Medicine in 1850. He chaired the "General Meeting of the members and friends of the Irish Society for Women's Suffrage" on 21 February 1872 organised by Anna Haslam. Owens was the Irish Unionist Lord Mayor of Dublin in 1876, during which time he was knighted. Owens was a Justice of the Peace for the city and was Sheriff of Dublin City in 1881.

He married Rebecca Anna Letitia Owen, daughter of Major William Owen, in 1831.

Civic offices
| Preceded by Peter Paul McSwiney | Lord Mayor of Dublin; 1876–1877 | Succeeded by Hugh Tarpey |
