= Lord Mayor of Dublin =

Honorific title of the chairperson of Dublin City Council

- Ardmhéara Bhaile Átha Cliath
- Incumbent; Daryl Barron since 29 June 2026
- Residence: The Mansion House
- Appointer: Dublin City Council
- Term length: 1 year
- Inaugural holder: Richard Muton (Mayor); Sir Daniel Bellingham (Lord Mayor)
- Formation: 1229 (as Mayor of Dublin); 1665 (as Lord Mayor of Dublin)
- Website: Lord Mayor of Dublin

The Lord Mayor of Dublin (Irish: Ardmhéara Bhaile Átha Cliath) (Note: Per section 32 of the Local Government Act, 2001: "(3) Where titles are continued in accordance with subsection (1), the holders of the offices concerned shall, as appropriate, be styled— (b) in the case of Dublin City Council, in the Irish language Ard-Mhéara Chathair Bhaile Átha Cliath and Leas Ard-Mhéara Chathair Bhaile Átha Cliath, and in the English language Lord Mayor of the City of Dublin and Deputy Lord Mayor of the City of Dublin.") is the honorary title of the chairperson (Irish: Cathaoirleach [ˈkahiːɾˠl̠ʲəx]) of Dublin City Council which is the local government body for the city of Dublin, the capital of Ireland. The incumbent, since June 2026, is Fianna Fáil councillor, Daryl Barron. The office holder is elected annually by the members of the council.

== Background ==
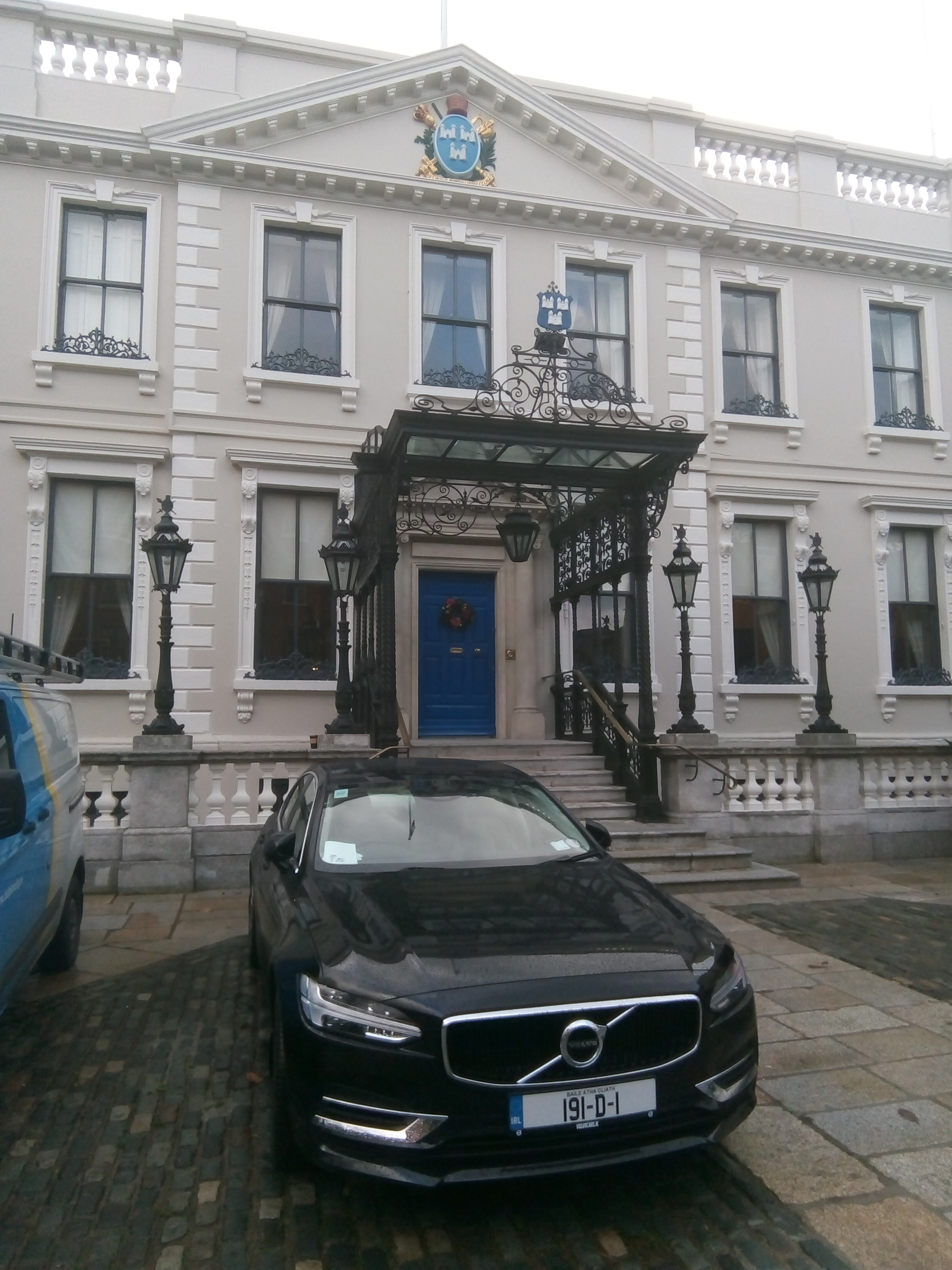
The Mansion House with the Lord Mayor's official car, a Volvo S90 T8 hybrid. Note the 191-D-1 licence plate, indicating that it was the first car registered in County Dublin in 2019.

The office of the Mayor of Dublin was created in June 1229 by Henry III. The office of mayor was elevated to Lord mayor in 1665 by Charles II, and as part of this process received the honorific the Right Honourable (the Rt Hon.). Lord mayors were ex-officio members of the Privy Council of Ireland, which also entitled them to be addressed as the Right Honourable. Though the Privy Council was de facto abolished in 1922, the lord mayor continued to be entitled to be addressed as The Right Honourable as a result of the Municipal Corporations (Ireland) Act 1840, which granted the title in law. The Local Government Act 2001 finally removed the title as a consequence of the repeal of the 1840 act.

For centuries the Mayor was elected by the 24 aldermen who made up the upper chamber of Dublin Corporation.

The business of the corporation would have been transacted in the Tholsel.

== Functions ==
Following the reforms of 1840, the office became largely symbolic and its responsibilities consist of chairing meetings of the city council and representing the city at public events. Apart from a few reserved functions, which are exercised by the city council as a whole, executive power is exercised by the chief executive, a council official appointed by the Public Appointments Service (formerly by the Local Appointments Commission). Except on a handful of occasions where the city government has been suspended for not striking a rate (a level of local tax), Dublin has had a mayor for nearly eight hundred years.

== City regalia and facilities ==
=== Residence ===
The lord mayor resides in the eighteenth-century Mansion House on Dawson Street.

=== Chain of office ===
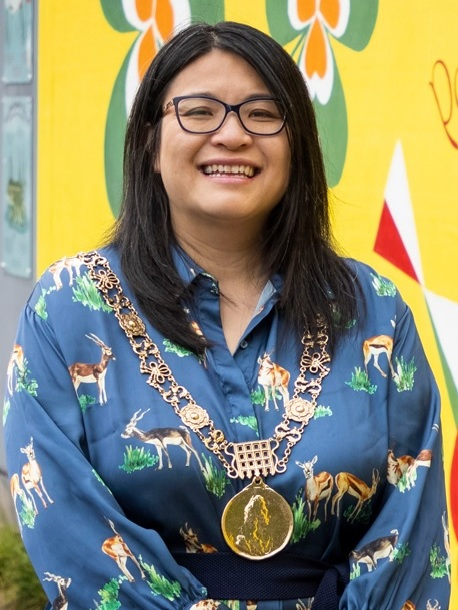
Hazel Chu wearing the lord mayor's chain of office in 2021.

The chain is the outward sign of the office of the lord mayor and is worn within the city when performing official civic functions, important ceremonial occasions and also as appropriate at other times, such as opening conferences, new businesses, etc. It is also worn, at the lord mayor's discretion, when paying visits to such places as schools, churches and the emergency services.

The lord mayor of Dublin's gold chain of office was presented by King William III to the City of Dublin in 1698. The chain is composed of decorative links including the Tudor rose, a harp, a trefoil-shaped knot and the letter S (thought to stand for Seneschal or Steward). A circular gold medal with the bust of William III hangs from the chain. The previous chain was not returned by Michael Creagh, the Protestant Jacobite lord mayor in 1688–1689.

=== Dublin city seal ===
The city seal dates from 1229/1230 when it was used by the Dublin City Assembly to issue a deed to the Town Clerk. One side shows three watchtowers above one of the city gates being defended by archers, while the reverse side shows a merchant ship at sea.

=== Great Dublin civic sword ===
The civic sword dates from the 1390s and was made for Henry IV of England in 1399. He gave it to the City of Dublin in 1409/1410.

=== Great mace of Dublin ===
The Great mace dates from 1717/1718 and incorporates parts of an earlier mace made in 1665 for the first lord mayor of Dublin, Sir Daniel Bellingham.

The city sword and Great mace are still used at major civic events such as the Honorary Freedom of the City conferring. All of the above are on display in City Hall, Dublin.

=== Lord mayor's coach ===
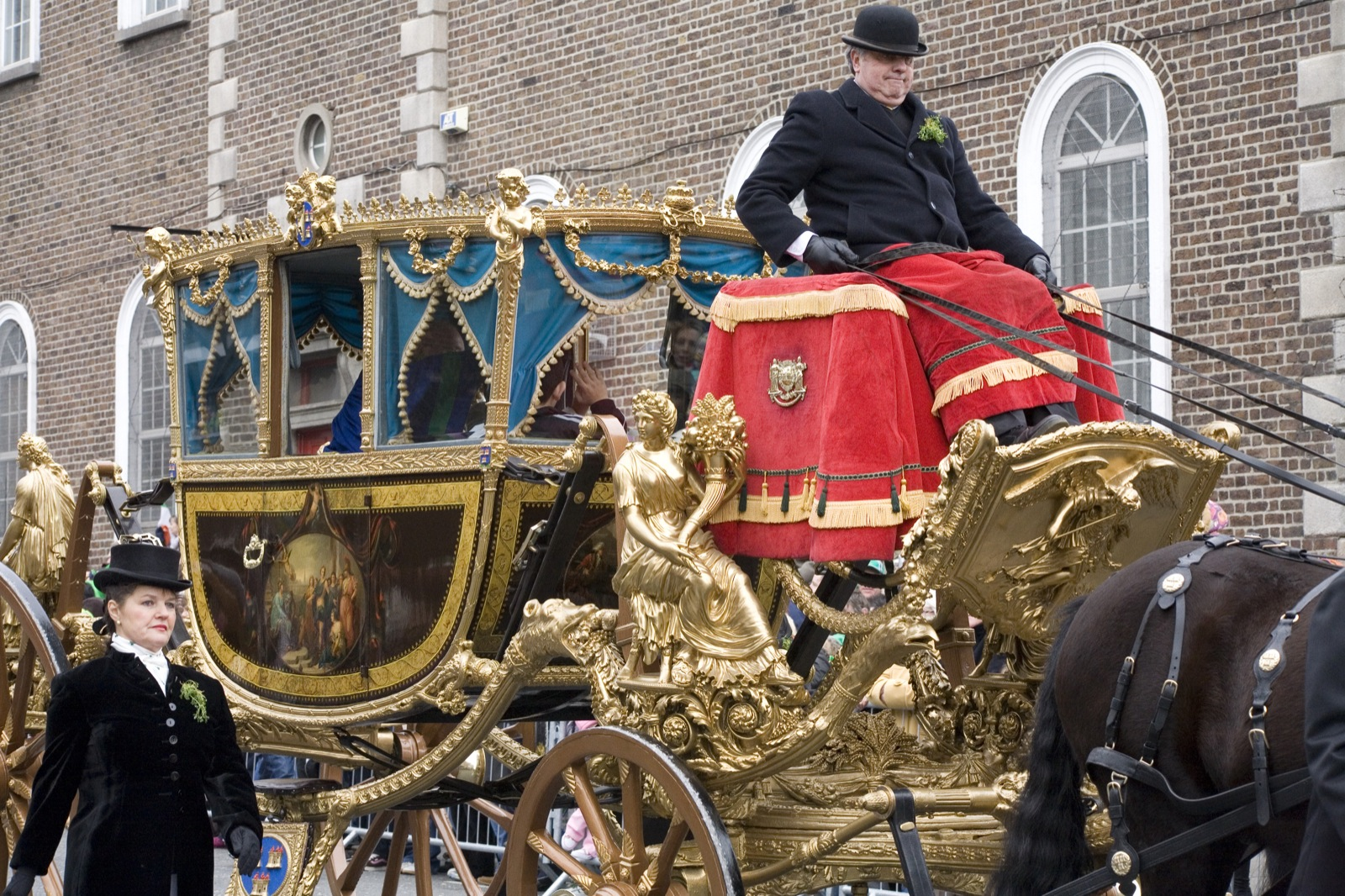
The lord mayor's coach at the 2007 Saint Patrick's Day parade in Dublin.

The lord mayor's coach was built in 1789 by William Whitton, of Dominick Street, and made its first appearance on the streets of Dublin on 4 November 1791 in an annual event to mark the birthday of William III. The elaborately decorated coach far exceeded its original budget and was completed for a total cost of £2,690 13s 5d. The coach was used for ceremonial occasions up until 1932 when, due to its poor condition, it was placed in storage. Following expert restoration, the coach returned to public life in 1976 and is a feature of Dublin's annual Saint Patrick's Day parade.

=== Car number plate ===
A privilege enjoyed by the lord mayor is to receive the first car registration number in Dublin for each new year as well as receiving the use of a car for their term of office.

=== Bicycle ===
Since 2018, each new lord mayor is offered an official bicycle by the Dublin Cycling Campaign. Nial Ring was the first recipient.

== Notable mayors ==
- Richard Muton (1229–1230), Dublin's first Mayor
- Gilbert de Lyvet (1233–1234, 1235–1237)
- John Drake, three times Mayor between 1401 and 1412, who led the Dubliners to victory over the O'Byrne clan of County Wicklow at the Battle of Bloody Bank in 1402
- Bartholomew Ball (1553–1554), whose widow Blessed Margaret Ball was martyred by their eldest son, Walter
- Walter Ball (1580–1581), Commissioner for Ecclesiastical Causes – implemented the Reformation in Dublin
- Francis Taylor (1595–1596), who was incarcerated because of his Catholicism, and has been declared a martyr for his faith and beatified by the Catholic Church
- Sir Daniel Bellingham (1665–1666), first lord mayor
- Jean Desmynieres (1666–1667) and Lewis Desmynieres (1669–1670), Huguenot lord mayors of Dublin
- Sir Michael Creagh (1688–1689) who, although a Protestant, was a supporter of the Catholic James II
- Sir Mark Rainsford (1700–1701), original founder of what was to become St James' Gate (Guinness) Brewery
- Daniel O'Connell (1841–1842), leader of campaigns for Catholic Emancipation and Repeal of the Acts of Union; first Catholic lord mayor of Dublin since 1690
- Sir John Barrington (1865–1866 and 1879–1880), the first Quaker to hold the office
- James Shanks (1893–1894), last Unionist to hold office
- Sir Thomas Devereux Pile (1900–1901), last titled person to hold office
- Laurence O'Neill (1917–1924), who served as the lord mayor throughout the Irish War of Independence and the Irish Civil War
- Alfie Byrne (1930–1939 and 1954–1955), longest-serving lord mayor of Dublin in the office's 800-year history
- Kathleen Clarke (1939–1941), first woman to hold the office
- Robert Briscoe (1956–1957 and 1961–1962), first Jewish lord mayor of Dublin
- Tomás Mac Giolla (1993–1994), former republican prisoner and long-time leader of Sinn Féin, and later the Worker's Party of Ireland
- Hazel Chu (2020–2021), first person of Chinese ethnicity to be mayor of a European capital

== See also ==
- Lord mayor of Belfast
- Lord mayor of Cork
- Mayor of Kilkenny
- City status in Ireland
