= John Rogerson (1676–1741) =

Irish politician, lawyer and judge (1676–1741)

John Rogerson (1676–1741) was an Irish politician, lawyer, and judge who became Solicitor-General, Attorney-General for Ireland, and Lord Chief Justice of the King's Bench in Ireland.

== Biography ==
He was educated at Trinity College Dublin, and graduated in 1694. He may briefly have considered joining his father in his business as a merchant, but quickly resolved on a legal career instead. He entered Middle Temple in 1690 and was called to the Irish Bar in 1701.

Rogerson was Member of Parliament for Granard and Dublin City. He was a staunch supporter of the House of Hanover, despite marrying into the Ludlow family, many of whom, including his own wife Elizabeth, were described as "ferocious Tories". He was appointed as Solicitor-General in 1714. He became Attorney-General for Ireland in 1720 and Lord Chief Justice of the King's Bench in 1727. The last promotion was much against the wishes of the influential Archbishop of Armagh, Hugh Boulter, who interfered regularly in judicial appointments, invariably preferred English-born officials to Irish, and disliked Rogerson personally. It was said that Rogerson's great fortune, which he inherited from his father, played a part in his elevation to the Bench. His mother-in-law Alice Lachard was also an heiress, with large estates in Wales. An alternative explanation was that no English judge would take the position, so that the Archbishop was grudgingly forced to accept Rogerson's elevation to the Bench.

He was the elder son of Sir John Rogerson, merchant, Member of Parliament for Clogher and Dublin City, who gave his name to Sir John Rogerson's Quay, and who left his son a large fortune. His mother was Sir John's first wife Elizabeth Proby, daughter of Emmanuel Proby and Mary Bland, and granddaughter of Sir Peter Probie, Lord Mayor of London. He lived mainly at The Glen, the house his father had built in Glasnevin, and also had a townhouse on Henry Street.

=== Marriage and issue ===
He married Elizabeth, daughter of Stephen Ludlow of Ardsallagh, County Meath (died 1721) MP for Dunleer, and his wife Alice Lachard of Wales, and had at least five children:

- John, who is thought to have died young and unmarried
- Elizabeth, who married Abraham Creighton, 1st Baron Erne, and had four children
- Arabella, who married firstly William Casaubon, by whom she had at least three children, and secondly Sir James Cotter, 1st Baronet, by whom she had four children
- Frances, who married Robert Leslie of Glaslough and had at least two children
- Hannah, who married in 1741 Anthony Jephson, son of [Anthony Jephson (died 1755)] and had no children.

=== Death ===
He died in August 1741 at his house in Henry Street, of the infectious fever which was rampant that year, the second year of the Great Irish Famine of 1740-41, which he apparently caught while travelling on the Ulster circuit, and which also claimed the life of John Wainwright, a popular and respected Baron of the Court of Exchequer (Ireland). That he was aware of the danger is shown by the fact that he made his will before setting out on circuit. As his only son had died his estate was divided between his four daughters.

Parliament of Ireland
Preceded by John Perceval; Wentworth Harman	Member of Parliament for Granard; 1713–1715; With: John Parnell	Succeeded by John Parnell; James Peppard
Preceded by John Forster; Benjamin Burton	Member of Parliament for Dublin City; 1715–1727; With: Benjamin Burton	Succeeded by Samuel Burton; William Howard
Legal offices
Preceded by Francis Bernard	Solicitor-General for Ireland; 1714–1720	Succeeded by Thomas Marlay
Preceded by George Gore	Attorney-General for Ireland; 1720–1727	Succeeded by Thomas Marlay
Preceded by William Whitshed	Lord Chief Justice of the King's Bench for Ireland; 1727–1741	Succeeded by Thomas Marlay
