= Sir James Somerville, 1st Baronet =

Lord Mayor of Dublin, Ireland

Sir James Somerville, 1st Baronet (c. 1698 – 16 August 1748) was an Irish politician.

He was the only son of Thomas Somerville and his wife Sarah King, daughter of James King. In 1729, Somerville entered the Irish House of Commons as Member of Parliament for Dublin City, representing the constituency until his death in 1748. In 1736, he was appointed Lord Mayor of Dublin. On 14 February 1748, only months before his death, he was created a Baronet of Somerville, in the County of Meath.

On 2 February 1713, he married Elizabeth Quayle, daughter of James Quayle.

Somerville was succeeded in the baronetcy by his eldest son Quaile. His second son, Major William Somerville, was buried at St. Audoen's Church, Dublin.

Parliament of Ireland
Preceded by Samuel Burton; John Stoyte	Member of Parliament for Dublin City; 1729–1748; With: Samuel Burton 1729–1733; Humphrey French 1733–1737; Nathaniel Pearson 1737–1748	Succeeded by Charles Burton; Sir Samuel Cooke, 1st Bt
Baronetage of Ireland
New creation	Baronet (of Somerville); February–August 1748	Succeeded by Quaile Somerville
Civic offices
Preceded by George Forbes	Lord Mayor of Dublin; 1736–1737	Succeeded by William Walker
