= William Whitshed =

Irish politician

The Right Honourable William Whitshed
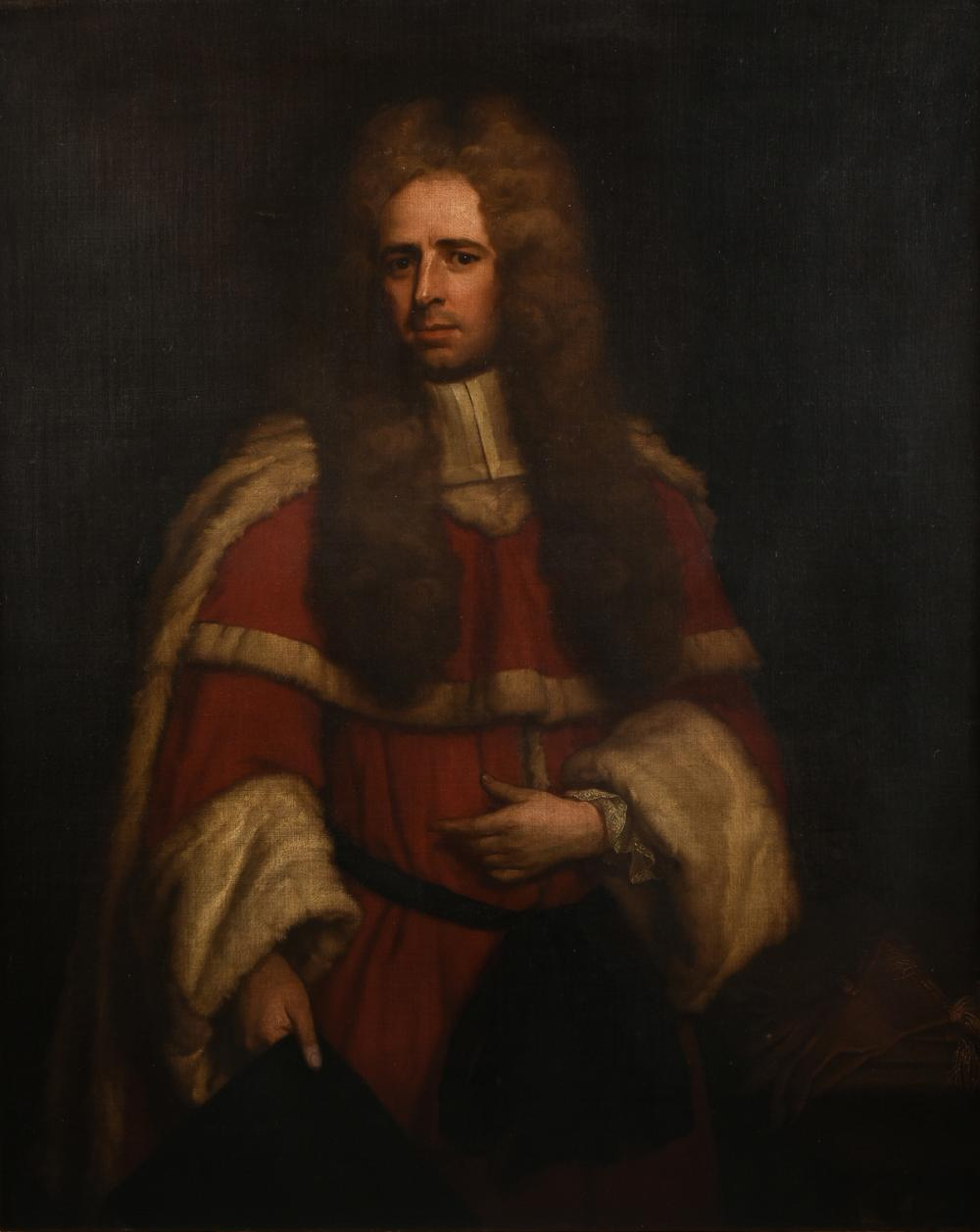
- William Whitshed in a portrait by Jonathan Richardson

Lord Chief Justice of Ireland
- In office 1714–1727
- Monarch: George I
- Preceded by: Sir Richard Cox, Bt
- Succeeded by: John Rogerson

William Whitshed (1679–1727) was an Irish politician and judge who held office as Solicitor-General and Lord Chief Justice of Ireland; just before his death he became Chief Justice of the Irish Common Pleas. He became the Member of Parliament for County Wicklow in 1703, and was appointed as Solicitor-General in 1709; he was Lord Chief Justice 1714–1727.

He is mainly remembered for the bitter hatred he inspired in Jonathan Swift, who among many other insults called him a "vile and profligate villain", and compared him to William Scroggs, the Lord Chief Justice of England in the 1670s, who was notorious for corruption. The principal cause for Swift's hatred of the judge was the trial of Edward Waters, Swift's publisher, for seditious libel, where Whitshed's conduct of the trial was widely condemned as improper, and Whitshed's unsuccessful efforts to have another publisher indicted for bringing out The Drapier Letters.

== Background and early career ==
He was born in Dublin to a long-established family of Dublin merchants who also played a prominent part in politics; his father Thomas Whitshed (1645–1697) sat in the Irish House of Commons as member for Carysfort and was also a practising barrister. His mother was Mary Quin, daughter of Mark Quin, who became one of Dublin's richest citizens and was Lord Mayor of Dublin 1667–68, and his wife, Mary Roche. William was the eldest of thirteen children; a younger brother was Samuel Walter Whitshed. His grandfather, Mark Quin, had committed suicide in 1674 by cutting his throat with a razor in Christ Church Cathedral, Dublin, apparently because he believed that his wife was unfaithful to him, a fact which Swift and other enemies of Whitshed later seized on to humiliate him.

James Quin, one of the most famous actors of his time, was the son of Whitsed's uncle, the elder James Quin (died 1710), another barrister. The younger James unsuccessfully claimed a share of the Quin fortune, but could not prove that his parents had been lawfully married. Whitshed was one of the heirs who benefited from James's failure to make out his claim. William's sister Mary married the politician and judge John Parnell, who was a brother of the poet Thomas Parnell and an ancestor of Charles Stewart Parnell. Whitshed advanced his brother-in-law's career, although Swift was one of many who regarded Parnell as a "booby". Admittedly Swift extended his feud with Whitshed to his entire family, and would have been unlikely to see any good in his brother-in-law.

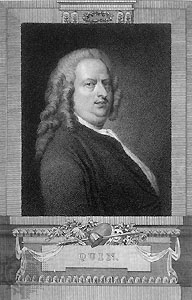
James Quin, the leading actor, who was Whitshed's first cousin

Whitshed entered Middle Temple in 1694 and was called to the Irish Bar. He did not have any great reputation as a lawyer or as a politician and his rapid rise to power caused some surprise; in particular, his elevation to the office of Lord Chief Justice when he was little more than 35 years old was most unusual, if not unprecedented. Ball attributes his success to his family's wealth and political connections, and the friendship of William King, Archbishop of Dublin, who had considerable though not unlimited influence over judicial appointments. John Parnell, William's brother-in-law, probably also owed his appointment to the Bench to King's influence, as the two men had always been close.

== Conflict with Swift ==
Whitshed's ambition was by no means satisfied by becoming Chief Justice: he hoped, with Archbishop King's support, to become Lord Chancellor of Ireland, and it may have been this ambition which led him into the conflict with Jonathan Swift which so greatly harmed his reputation.

In 1720, he presided at the trial of Edward Waters for seditious libel, in which he had printed Swift's pamphlet On the Universal Use of Irish Manufacture. The result was something of an embarrassment since while Waters was found guilty, this was only after the jury had tried nine times to bring in a verdict of not guilty. Swift, quite unperturbed, contented himself with satirising Whitshed and Godfrey Boate, the junior judge at the trial.

In 1724, the Crown moved against Swift again, and again took an indirect route to their goal. John Harding, the printer of the Drapier Letters, was arrested and some efforts were made to formally identify and apprehend "Drapier" (although there was can have been little doubt in Government circles as to his real identity). Whitshed was pressed into service to persuade a grand jury to find that the Drapier Letters were seditious. This time the result was a complete failure: although Whitshed spared no efforts, interviewing the jurors individually, they refused to give a guilty verdict against Harding.

Swift, by now thoroughly enraged, attacked Whitshed in a series of verses, notably Verses Occasioned by Whitshed's motto on his Coach, with a venom that few judges have ever had to endure. Swift's friends joined the battle, and even painful personal details like the suicide of Whitshed's grandfather, and his grandmother's supposed adultery, were dragged up: "In church, your grandsire cut his throat... [your] grandame had gallants by the twenties, and bore your mother to a prentice". The Government, embarrassed by the whole affair and conscious that public opinion was on Swift's side, did little to protect the Chief Justice.

== Last years ==
Whitshed's hopes of becoming Lord Chancellor were never realised: his patron Archbishop King was steadily losing influence to Hugh Boulter, Archbishop of Armagh, who was not an admirer of Whitshed. Furthermore, the Swift affair had made him bitterly unpopular: it was admitted frankly in Government circles that it was impossible for a man so generally detested to be made Lord Chancellor.

In 1726, he asked to be transferred to the Court of Common Pleas, saying that the burden of his office was becoming too much for him as he aged. The following year it was decided to make him Chief Justice of the Irish Common Pleas, but he died suddenly, aged only 48, shortly afterwards. His early death was blamed by some of his friends on the toll taken on his constitution by the vicious personal attacks on him by Swift. Others blamed a lack of proper medical care, since no doctor attended him during his last illness, despite the seriousness of his condition. He was unmarried and had no children: his estate passed to his next surviving brother.

== Assessment ==
Ball notes that Whitshed as a young man was generally well-liked, although he became extremely unpopular in later life, even in Government circles. On the other hand, another legal historian, Bartholomew Duhigg, accused Whitshed of deciding cases on the basis of personal prejudice and malice, although he accepts that the judge did not take bribes and that his personal life was blameless.

Parliament of Ireland
| Preceded by John Price; Richard Edwards | Member of Parliament for County Wicklow; 1703–1714; With: Richard Edwards 1703–1713; John Allen 1713–1714 | Succeeded by Henry Percy; Robert Allen |
Legal offices
| Preceded by John Forster | Solicitor-General for Ireland; 1709–1711 | Succeeded by Francis Bernard |
| Preceded by Sir Richard Cox | Lord Chief Justice of the King's Bench for Ireland; 1714–1727 | Succeeded by John Rogerson |
| Preceded by Thomas Wyndham | Chief Justice of the Irish Common Pleas; 1727 | Succeeded by James Reynolds |
