= Dublin election riot =

Riots in Dublin, Ireland (1713)

The Dublin election riot occurred during the contested Irish General Election of 1713.

It concerned the Dublin City constituency, which returned two members to the Irish Parliament. One of the Whig candidates was John Forster, a leading member of the party and a former Attorney General. An undertone of the election was the prospect of the Hanoverian Succession which the Whigs supported. The Tory candidates enjoyed a great deal of popularity with the Catholic Jacobites in the city.

Traditionally the voting took place at the Blue Coat School on the north side of the River Liffey, but this time it was held at the Tholsel in the centre of the city, considered a stronghold of the Whigs. On polling day they took over almost the entire building, shutting out the Tory supporters. This provoked a group of Tories to storm the building and begin smashing up the platform.

A detachment of the Irish Army was called out to restore order. They were attacked, with planks of wood from the dismantled platform being hurled at them. The troops responded by opening fire, killing one man and wounding several others. A compromise was organized by the authorities in which the Whigs and Tories could vote in separate buildings. The Whigs then secured both seats in what was otherwise a national victory for the Tories. Many of the Tories who had cast their votes were proved to not be eligible to do so under the Penal Laws.

Blame for the incident was eventually placed on James Cotter, a Catholic Jacobite from Cork. The role of an associate of a leading Tory Constantine Phipps, the Lord Chancellor of Ireland, was also highlighted.

== Bibliography ==
- Dickson, David. Dublin: The Making of a Capital City. Profile Books, 2014.
- Simms, J.G. War and Politics in Ireland, 1649-1730. Hambledon Press, 1986.
