= 1790 Irish general election =

General election in the Kingdom of Ireland

- c. April–May 1790

All 300 seats of the House of Commons 151 seats were needed for a majority
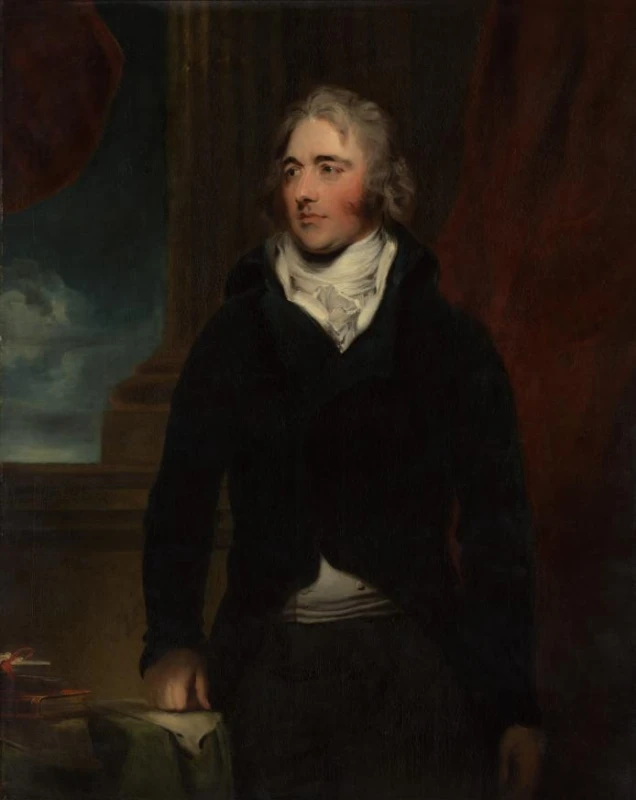

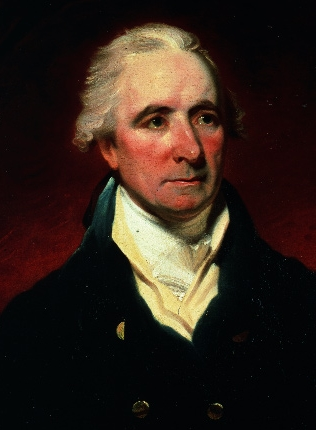
	First party	Second party
Leader	Robert Hobart	Henry Grattan
Party	Junta	Irish Whig Party
Leader's seat	Armagh Borough	Dublin City
Speaker before election
John Foster
Administration
Elected Speaker
John Foster
Administration

The 1790 Irish general election was a general election to the Irish House of Commons in the Kingdom of Ireland, held around April–May 1790 after the House of Commons was dissolved on 8 April.

It was the second election under the Constitution of 1782, which had granted greater legislative independence to Ireland. Despite the new constitution, political tensions persisted over parliamentary reform and the influence of the Dublin Castle administration.

On 2 July 1790, following the election, the Government-backed speaker John Foster was re-elected.

== Background ==
The political landscape was dominated by two main factions:

- the Administration, aligned with Dublin Castle and British interests, led by figures like John FitzGibbon, the Attorney General.
- the Patriot Party, advocating for reform and greater autonomy

Since the last election a new political grouping had emerged in Ireland - the Irish Whig Club. This group had been founded in Dublin on 26 June 1789, coming together in response to the Regency Crisis of 1788–1789, where the groups that would later form the nucleus of this Club had supported making George Regent in response to George III's temporary insanity, and had been left exposed following George III's recovery and the threats from the Duke of Buckingham.

This group included 56 members of the Irish Parliament - 36 MPs and 20 Lords. The Whig Club was largely composed of members of the Patriot Party, and led by Henry Grattan, George Ponsonby, John Forbes, and Lord Charlemont, with Thomas Conolly being appointed General Secretary.

The new party did well in County Dublin, which saw several heated contests - including the return of Henry Grattan and Lord Henry FitzGerald in Dublin City. The party however fared poorly in the country at large.

William Ponsonby, 1st Baron Ponsonby, later leader of the Irish Whigs during the course of the parliament, was also close to William Fitzwilliam, 4th Earl Fitzwilliam, who would briefly serve as Lord Lieutenant.

=== Constituencies and electorate ===
Borough constituencies were often controlled by aristocratic patrons, limiting electoral competition.

The electorate remained restricted to Protestant freeholders, as the Roman Catholic Relief Act 1793 had not yet been passed, excluding Catholics from voting despite growing calls for emancipation.

Numbers	Borough	County	University	Total
Constituencies	117	32	1	150
Members	234	64	2	300

== Campaign ==
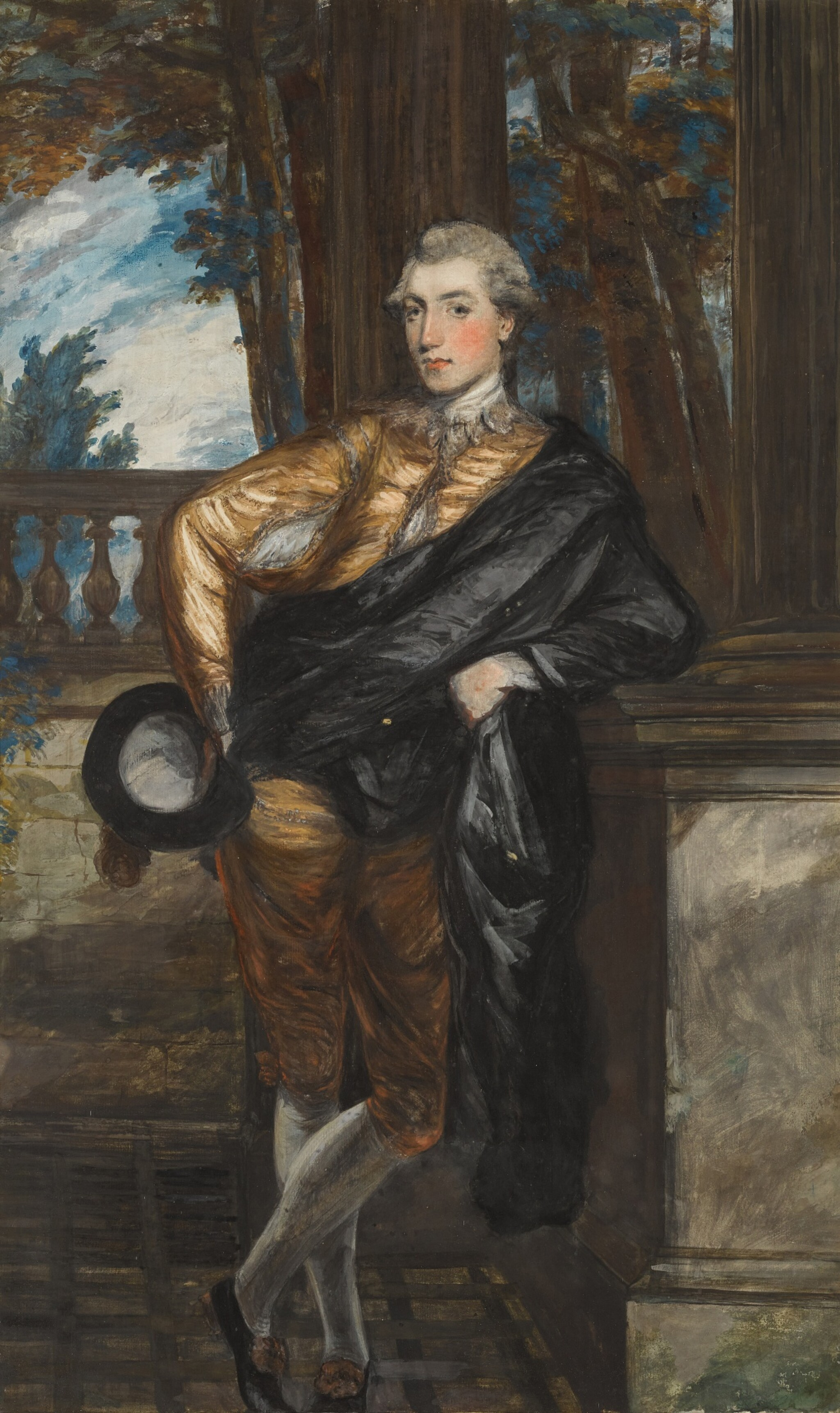
A young Robert Stewart, later Viscount Castlereagh, contested and won County Down in a particularly long and expensive contest.

The campaign was shaped by debates over parliamentary reform and the lingering influence of Dublin Castle. The Patriot Party, under Grattan, sought to build on the successes of 1782, pushing for a more independent and representative parliament. The Administration, backed by the Lord Lieutenant of Ireland, aimed to maintain control through patronage and influence over borough seats. In counties like County Down, aristocratic families such as the Marquess of Downshire and the Earl of Londonderry dominated, leading to expensive and competitive campaigns.

The election in County Down in particular was one of the longest and most expensive in Irish parliamentary history, with a young Robert Stewart (later Viscount Castlereagh) spending £60,000 and Earl of Hillsborough £30,000 over a 3-month contest (equivalent to £8 million and £4 million respectively in 2026).

Alongside the young Robert Stewart, a young Arthur Wellesley was also elected for Trim.

In County Armagh, sectarian tensions between Catholic Defenders and Protestant Peep o' Day Boys were beginning to emerge, influencing local politics, though Catholics could not yet vote. Specific candidate lists are poorly documented, but prominent figures like Grattan in Dublin City were key players.

== Aftermath ==
Following the election, John Foster was elected Speaker of the Irish House of Commons, succeeding Sexton Pery. The parliament faced growing unrest, with the Society of United Irishmen gaining traction and advocating radical reform. The 1790s saw escalating tensions, culminating in the Irish Rebellion of 1798 and the eventual Acts of Union 1800.

== See also ==
- House of Commons of Ireland
- Octennial Act 1768
- Constitution of 1782
- Society of United Irishmen
