= Terence MacDermott =

Irish merchant and Jacobite politician

Sir Terence MacDermott (died after 1699) was an Irish merchant and Jacobite politician.

MacDermott was born in County Louth, but became a successful merchant in Dublin and obtained property in Montserrat. In 1687 he became an alderman of Dublin and he was enrolled on the city's franchise on 15 April 1688. A supporter of James II of England following the Glorious Revolution, MacDermott was a Member of Parliament for Dublin City in the Patriot Parliament summoned by James II in 1689.

On 31 March 1689 he was elected Lord Mayor of Dublin and on 29 September 1689 was sworn in as mayor in succession to Sir Michael Creagh. On 15 July 1689, he was made a justice of the peace. He implemented Jacobite policies in Dublin, including stringent wartime price controls on goods within the city. He was knighted by James II in May 1690. On 3 July 1690, MacDermott fled Dublin following the Jacobite defeat at the Battle of the Boyne. He went to Galway, taking the mayoral chain and collar with him, where he was briefly imprisoned by the Earl of Tyrconnell for refusing to hand over the livery collar.

After the Battle of Aughrim in 1691, MacDermott fled to France. In April 1692 he petitioned for a pardon in order to return to Ireland, stating his willingness to be loyal to the government of William III of England; this was rejected. He was later attainted and outlawed. In September 1695, James II instructed him to surrender the mayoral chain to Sir William Ellis.

MacDermott died sometime after 1699, likely in France. He was the last Roman Catholic mayor of Dublin before the election of Daniel O'Connell in 1841.

Parliament of Ireland
Preceded by William Smith; Sir William Davys	Member of Parliament for Dublin City; 1689; With: Sir Michael Creagh	Succeeded by Thomas Coote; Sir Michael Mitchell
Civic offices
Preceded by Sir Michael Creagh	Lord Mayor of Dublin; 1689–1690	Succeeded by John Otrington
