= Sir Samuel Cooke, 1st Baronet =

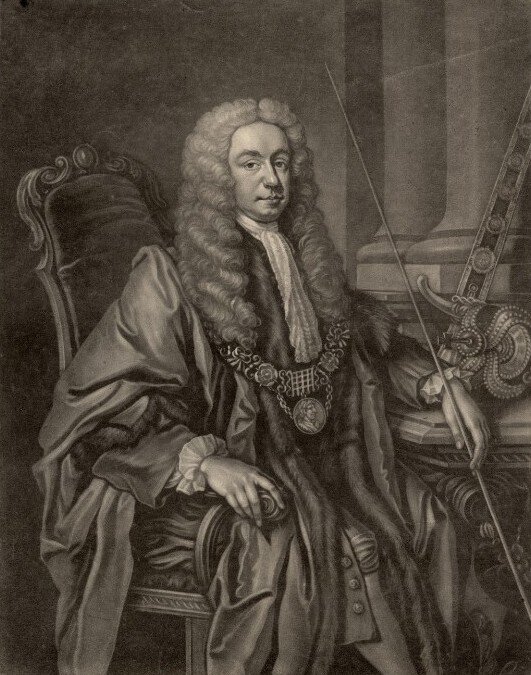
Engraving of Cooke

Sir Samuel Cooke, 1st Baronet (c. 1690 – 9 February 1758) was an Anglo-Irish politician.

On 28 December 1741, Cooke was created a baronet, of Dublin in the Baronetage of Ireland. He married Judith Trench, daughter of Very Rev. John Trench in 1726.

He served as a member of parliament for Dublin City in the Irish House of Commons between 1749 and his death in 1758, when his title became extinct. He also served as Lord Mayor of Dublin in 1740.

Parliament of Ireland
Preceded by Nathaniel Pearson; Sir James Somerville, Bt	Member of Parliament for Dublin City; 1749–1758; With: Charles Burton	Succeeded by Sir Charles Burton, Bt; James Dunn
Baronetage of Ireland
New creation	Baronet (of Dublin); 1741–1758	Extinct
Civic offices
Preceded by Daniel Falkiner	Lord Mayor of Dublin; 1740–1741	Succeeded by William Aldrich
