= William Handcock (1654–1701) =

Irish politician and judge

Sir William Handcock (11 September 1654 – September 1701) was an Irish politician and judge.

Born in County Westmeath, he was the second son of William Handcock and his wife Abigail, daughter of Sir Thomas Stanley and Mary Hammond, and sister of Thomas Stanley. His older brother was Thomas Handcock. He was educated at Trinity College, Dublin.

Handcock entered the Irish House of Commons in 1692, representing Boyle until the following year. He sat for Dublin City from 1695 until 1699. Handcock was appointed Recorder of Dublin in 1695, a post he held until his death in 1701.

On 31 May 1685, he married Elizabeth Coddington, daughter of Nicholas Coddington and Elizabeth Dixie. They had at least three children, John, the only son and heir, Anne, who married Patrick Wemyss MP, and Abigail, who married Edward Griffith, and was the ancestor of Sir Richard Griffith, 1st Baronet.

Parliament of Ireland
Preceded by Patriot Parliament	Member of Parliament for Boyle; 1692–1693; With: Stephen Ludlow	Succeeded by Sir Edward Crofton, 2nd Bt; John King
Preceded by Thomas Coote; Sir Michael Mitchell	Member of Parliament for Dublin City; 1695–1699; With: Sir John Rogerson	Succeeded by John Forster; Benjamin Burton
Legal offices
Preceded by Nehemiah Donnellan	Recorder of Dublin; 1695–1701	Succeeded by John Forster
