= John Rogerson (1648–1724) =

Lord Mayor of Dublin, Ireland

Sir John Rogerson
- Born: John Rogerson; 1648; Holland
- Died: 1724 (aged 75–76); Dublin, Ireland
- Occupations: Politician, merchant and property developer

Sir John Rogerson (1648–1724) was an Irish politician, wealthy merchant and property developer.

Very little is known about his family background or his early life, except that he was born in the Dutch Republic in 1648, and that his father was named Francis. The Rogerson family were probably recent arrivals in Ireland, and may have been political exiles from the political troubles of the 1640s.

He lived in London in the late 1660s. He is recorded as a householder of Dublin from 1674, by which time he was already in business as a merchant. How precisely he made his money is not clear, but there is no doubt that he became a very rich man, with a reputation for being "hard-nosed" in his business dealings. The wealthy and well-connected Susan, Lady Belasyse, who had lent him substantial sums of money, found that he simply refused to repay them, and a lawsuit over the money dragged on until her death.

He was elected Lord Mayor of Dublin in 1693–1694 and represented Clogher in the Parliament of Ireland from 1692 to 1693, then Dublin City from 1695 to 1703. He was a firm supporter of the Glorious Revolution, and hostile to Roman Catholics, even protesting against the employment of Catholic labourers. He built his country residence, "The Glen" or "Glasnevin House", outside the village of Glasnevin: critics said that his manner of living suggested a nobleman rather than a merchant. A quay in Dublin was named Sir John Rogerson's Quay owing to his association with its development. In 1713, Dublin Corporation leased him lands by the River Liffey, on condition that he build a quay there.

He married firstly Elizabeth Proby (or Probie), daughter of Emmanuel Proby and Mary Bland, and granddaughter of Sir Peter Probie, Lord Mayor of London and his wife Elizabeth Thoroughgood. He married secondly Elizabeth Ward, daughter of John Ward and Elizabeth Vincent. By his first wife he was the father of John Rogerson Jnr, Lord Chief Justice of Ireland, and two younger sons, Richard, who was a barrister of the Middle Temple, and William (died 1721), who married Alice Molyneux, daughter of the leading physician Sir Thomas Molyneux, 1st Baronet, and his second wife Catherine Howard. They also had one daughter Susanna. His widow died in 1726.

Parliament of Ireland
Unknown	Member of Parliament for Clogher; 1692–1693; With: Edward Davis	Succeeded by William Wolseley; Richard Johnson
Preceded by Thomas Coote; Sir Michael Mitchell	Member of Parliament for Dublin City; 1695–1703; With: William Handcock	Succeeded by John Forster; Benjamin Burton
Civic offices
Preceded by Sir Michael Mitchell	Lord Mayor of Dublin; 1693–1694	Succeeded by George Blackhall
