= Michael Creagh (politician) =

Lord Mayor of Dublin, Ireland

Member of Parliament for Dublin City
- In office 1689–1691
- Monarch: James II
- Succeeded by: Thomas Coote

Lord Mayor of Dublin
- In office 1688–1689
- Preceded by: Thomas Hackett
- Succeeded by: Terence MacDermott

Personal details
- Died: 1738

Military service
- Allegiance: Jacobites
- Branch/service: Irish Army
- Battles/wars: Williamite War in Ireland: Battle of the Boyne

Sir Michael Creagh (died 1738) was an Irish politician and soldier.

Although a Protestant, he was a Jacobite supporter of the Catholic James II. He was Lord Mayor of Dublin from 1688 to 1689 and received James II on his arrival to the city in March 1689. He was a Member of Parliament for Dublin City in the Patriot Parliament in 1689. He raised an infantry regiment at his own expense to serve in the Irish Army during the Williamite War in Ireland (1689–91), which was present at the Battle of the Boyne.

Following the Jacobite defeat in Ireland, Creagh was attainted and fled to France and then to the Netherlands. He had returned to Ireland by the mid–1720s and turned his attention to regaining his confiscated estates. He converted from Roman Catholicism to the established Church of Ireland and became a broadsheet publisher. Creagh failed in his attempt to regain his confiscated properties and had to be helped from the public funds in 1732, 1733, and 1734. He died intestate in 1738.

Parliament of Ireland
Preceded by William Smith; Sir William Davys	Member of Parliament for Dublin City; 1689; With: Terence MacDermott	Succeeded by Thomas Coote; Sir Michael Mitchell
Civic offices
Preceded by Thomas Hackett	Lord Mayor of Dublin; 1688–1689	Succeeded by Terence MacDermott
