= Cooke baronets =

Baronetcy in the Baronetage of England

There have been three baronetcies created for persons with the surname Cooke, two in the Baronetage of England and one in the Baronetage of Ireland. One creation is extant as of 2013.

The Cooke Baronetcy, of Wheatley Hall in the County of York, was created in the Baronetage of England on 10 May 1661 for George Cooke, in recognition of his father's services during the Civil War and with remainder to his younger brother Henry, who succeeded as second Baronet in 1683. The third Baronet sat as Member of Parliament for Aldborough. The fourth Baronet represented East Retford in the House of Commons. The fifth Baronet was High Sheriff of Yorkshire in 1739. The ninth Baronet was a Deputy Lieutenant of Yorkshire. The tenth Baronet was High Sheriff of Yorkshire in 1903 and a Deputy Lieutenant of the West Riding of Yorkshire.

The ancestral seat of the Cooke family was Wheatley Hall, Doncaster, Yorkshire. Much of the original estate was purchased by the Cooke family in the early seventeenth century from the Levett family of High Melton and John Levett of York (described as 'Doctor John Levett'), a well-known York barrister.

Arms of Cooke Baronets of Broome Hall in Norfolk (Cooke of Linstead, Suffolk) Or, a chevron engrailed gules between three cinquefoils azure on a chief of the second a lion passant argent

The Cooke Baronetcy, "of Brome Hall in the County of Norfolk", was created in the Baronetage of England on 29 June 1663 for William Cooke. The father of the 1st Baronet was seated at the manor of Linstead in Suffolk, held by his family since the 15th century, and acquired Broome by marriage in 1603. The 1st Baronet married twice, firstly to Mary Astley, a daughter of Thomas Astley of Melton Constable in Norfolk, by whom he had his only son and heir the 2nd Baronet; secondly he married (as her second husband) Mary Greenwood (d.1686) (whose inscribed ledger stone survives in Broome Church) a daughter of William Greenwood of Burgh Castle in Suffolk and widow of William Stewart of Wisbech in Cambridgeshire. The 2nd Baronet, a Member of Parliament for Great Yarmouth and later for the county seat of Norfolk, married his step-sister Jane Stewart (d.1698) but died without issue in 1708 when the baronetcy became extinct. He was obliged to sell Broome Hall and died at Mendham in Suffolk.

The Cooke Baronetcy, of Dublin, was created in the Baronetage of Ireland on 28 December 1741 for Samuel Cooke. The title became extinct on his death in 1758.

== Cooke baronets, of Wheatley Hall (1661) ==
- Sir George Cooke, 1st Baronet (1628–1683)
- Sir Henry Cooke, 2nd Baronet (1633–1689)
- Sir George Cooke, 3rd Baronet (1662–1732)
- Sir Bryan Cooke, 4th Baronet (1684–1734)
- Sir George Cooke, 5th Baronet (1714–1756)
- Sir Bryan Cooke, 6th Baronet (1717–1766)
- Sir George Cooke, 7th Baronet (c. 1745–1823)
- Sir William Bryan Cooke, 8th Baronet (1782–1851)
- Sir William Ridley Charles Cooke, 9th Baronet (1827–1894)
- Sir William Henry Charles Wemyss Cooke, 10th Baronet (1872–1964)
- Sir Charles Arthur John Cooke, 11th Baronet (1905–1978)
- Sir David William Perceval Cooke, 12th Baronet (1935–2017)
- Sir Anthony Edmund Cooke-Yarborough, 13th Baronet (b 1956), the twelfth Baronet's 7th cousin, a descendant of the 3rd Baronet

The heir apparent to the Baronetcy is the present holder's son, George Edmund Cooke-Yarborough (b 1991).

== Cooke baronets, of Broome Hall (1663) ==
- Sir William Cooke, 1st Baronet (died 1681)
- Sir William Cooke, 2nd Baronet (c.1630-1708)

== Cooke baronets, of Dublin (1741) ==
- Sir Samuel Cooke, 1st Baronet (died 1758)
