= Azizunnessa Khatun =

Bengali poet (1864–1940)

Azizunnesa Khatun
- আজিজুন্নেছা খাঁতুন
- Born: 1864; Jamalpur, 24 Parganas, Bengal Presidency
- Died: 1940 (aged 75–76); Basirhat, Bengal Presidency
- Education: St. Xavier's College
- Occupation: Writer
- Writing career
- Language: Bengali
- Notable work: Udasīn Kabbo

Azizunnessa Khatun (Bengali: আজিজুন্নেছা খাঁতুন; 1864–1940) was a Bengali poet, writer, and philanthropist.

== Early life and education ==
Azizunnessa Khatun was born in 1864 to a Bengali Muslim family in Jamalpur, 24 Parganas, Bengal Presidency. Her father, Mir Chand Ali, was a Police Inspector, and their ancestral home was in Goadi, Nadia district. Khatun's early education began at home where she was taught the Arabic, Bengali, English, and Persian languages.

During her teenage years, Khatun married Moqaddesul Haque of Banshdaha. Haque encouraged his wife to continue her education, and so she enrolled at the St. Xavier's College in Calcutta where she studied Bengali and English under Professor Mairajuddin.

== Personal life ==
After the death of her first husband, Moqaddesul Haque, Khatun married Maulvi Qazi Hamidullah Khan, the erstwhile Zamindar of Tetulia. After the latter's death, Khatun married Qazi Lutfur Rahman of Banshdaha, though he too died soon after.

== Career ==
Khatun was a philanthropist. She funded the digging of ponds so that villagers could have access to clean water. She also founded a girls elementary school. In 1884, Khatun translated a work by the Anglo-Irish poet Thomas Parnell into Bengali, which she titled Udasīn Kabbo. Her works were published in a number of magazines.

== Death ==
Khatun died in Basirhat in 1940. One of her sons through Hamidullah Khan was Maulvi Qazi Mohammad Minnatullah Khan, a distinguished member of the Qazis of Tetulia.
