= 1797 Irish general election =

Last election in Kingdom of Ireland

- 1797

All 300 seats of the House of Commons 151 seats were needed for a majority
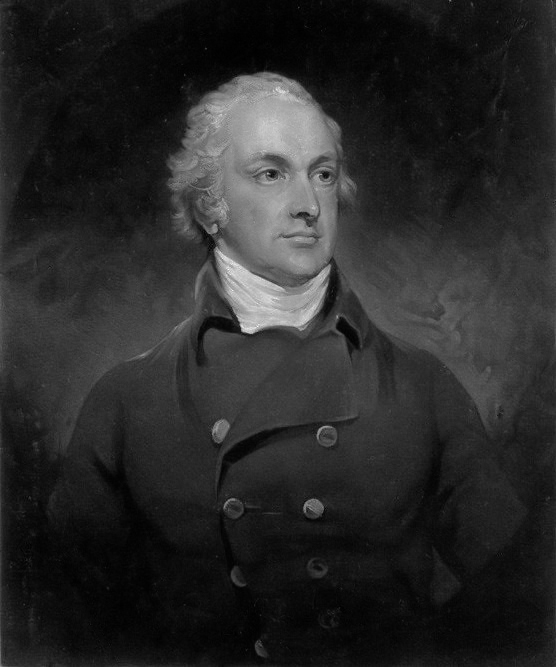

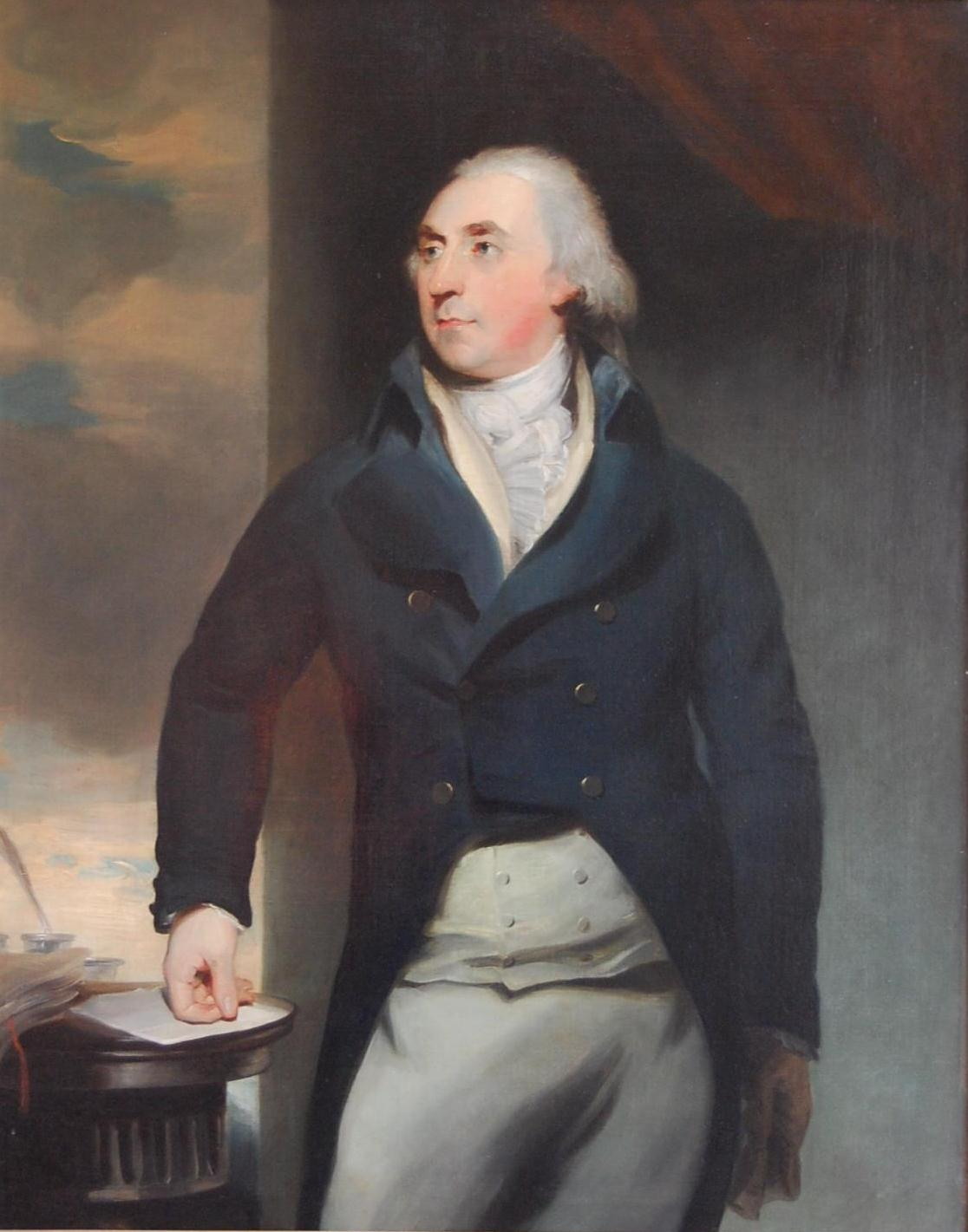
	First party	Second party
Leader	Thomas Pelham	William Ponsonby
Party	Administration	Irish Whig Party
Leader's seat	Clogher	County Kilkenny
Speaker before election
John Foster
Administration
Elected Speaker
John Foster
Administration

The 1797 Irish general election was the last general election to the Irish House of Commons, with the Acts of Union three years later uniting the Kingdom of Ireland with the Kingdom of Great Britain. The election followed the Roman Catholic Relief Act 1793, meaning it was the first general election in Ireland in which Catholics could vote, provided they met the property requirements. The election also coincided with simmering rebellion in Ireland, coming not long after an attempted French expedition to Ireland, and the following year witnessing the Irish Rebellion of 1798.

Despite the changes to the electorate, and the heavily political backdrop, the election was marked most by the apathy shown to it by Ireland's electorate.

Thomas Pelham, as Chief Secretary for Ireland, was responsible for representing Dublin Castle in the Irish House of Commons.

== Background ==
The election took place at a time of increasing unrest in Ireland. The preceding years had seen both the growth of the Society of United Irishmen within Ireland, as well as the beginning of the French Revolutionary Wars in Europe. Ulster in particular saw increasing unrest, with low level conflict between the Catholic Defenders and the Protestant Peep o' Day Boys. Both Irish and British Whigs were united in their opposition to the Irish security policies of the Pitt Government, and the Whigs also held the ear of the heir to the British throne, the Prince of Wales, through his close friend Lord Moira. The Irish Whigs therefore appeared to enter the election in a strong position.

The Lord Lieutenant closed parliament on 3 July 1797, and dissolved it on 11 July, thereby calling a general election.

Numbers	Borough	County	University	Total
Constituencies	117	32	1	150
Members	234	64	2	300

== Campaign ==
=== United Irishmen ===
The United Irishmen considered running Lord Edward FitzGerald and Arthur O’Connor as candidates for the constituencies of Antrim and Down, and in preparation organised meetings of freeholders in Armagh, Antrim and Down calling for the removal of the Castle junto. Father James Coigly played an active role in this campaign, distributing printed notices throughout Armagh and encouraging freeholders "to attend to their duty". He also likely authored the anonymous pamphlet, A view of the present state of Ireland with an account of the origin and progress of the disturbances in that country, which was heavily praised by James Hope.

=== Irish Whig Party ===
Henry Grattan, the prominent statesman, former leader of the Patriot Party, and Member of Parliament for Dublin, chose not to contest the election, suffering from ill-health and immense disappointment at both the increasing political polarization in Ireland and the failure of his attempts at Catholic Emancipation.

Grattan and Ponsonby had introduced a proposal for parliamentary reform in the previous parliament, with Grattan threatening that if it was rejected that he and the Whigs would withdraw from parliament. The bill, which would have allowed Catholics to become MPs, was defeated by 143 votes to 19. As a result, Grattan and a number of Whigs, including his fellow MP for Dublin Lord Henry FitzGerald withdrew. A number of Whigs did however remain in parliament.

== Results ==
Despite the revolutionary backdrop to the elections, the House was broadly similar. In the example of the 64 county seats, only 18 saw changes.
