= Michael Mitchell (politician) =

Anglo-Irish politician (died 1699)

Sir Michael Mitchell (died 1699) was an Anglo-Irish politician.

Mitchell was Sheriff of Dublin City in 1683. Between 1691 and 1693 he was Lord Mayor of Dublin, the first Protestant to be appointed to the role after the collapse of James II of England's Jacobite regime in Ireland. In 1692 he was elected as a Member of Parliament for Dublin City, serving until 1693.

Parliament of Ireland
Preceded by Sir Michael Creagh; Sir Terence MacDermott	Member of Parliament for Dublin City; 1692–1693; With: Thomas Coote	Succeeded by William Handcock; Sir John Rogerson
Civic offices
Preceded by John Otrington	Lord Mayor of Dublin; 1691–1693	Succeeded by Sir John Rogerson
