= Dublin City (Parliament of Ireland constituency) =

Pre-1801 constituency for the Irish House of Commons

- Former borough constituency for the Irish House of Commons
- County: County Dublin
- Borough: Dublin

1264–1801
- Seats: 2
- Replaced by: Dublin City (UKHC)

Dublin City was a constituency represented in the Irish House of Commons until its abolition in 1801.

== History ==
Dublin City had an electorate of between three and four thousand, making it the largest of the county-borough constituencies. In the 1760s the radical politician Charles Lucas used the seat as his political base.

It was succeeded by the Westminster constituency of Dublin City in 1801, remaining as a two-seat constituency.

== Members of Parliament, 1264–1801 ==
- 1376: John Blakhorn and John White were elected to come to England to consult with the king and council about the government of Ireland and about an aid for the king.
- 1557 James Stanihurst (speaker)
- 1560 James Stanihurst (speaker) and Robert Golding
- 1569 James Stanihurst (speaker)
- 1585 George Taylor and Nicholas Ball
- 1613–1615 Richard Bolton and Richard Barry
- 1634–1635 Richard Barry and Nathaniel Catelyn Speaker
- 1639–1649 Richard Barry and John Bysse
- 1654–55: Daniel Hutchinson
- 1656–58: Richard Tighe
- 1659: Arthur Annesley
- 1661–1666 William Smith and Sir William Davys

=== 1689–1801 ===
Election	First MP		Second MP	
1689	Sir Michael Creagh		Terence MacDermott	
1692	Thomas Coote		Sir Michael Mitchell	
1695	William Handcock		Sir John Rogerson	
1703	John Forster	Whig	Benjamin Burton	Whig
1715	John Rogerson		Benjamin Burton	Whig
1727	Samuel Burton		William Howard	
1728	Samuel Burton		John Stoyte	
1729	Samuel Burton		James Somerville (Note: Created a baronet in 1748.)	
1733	Humphrey French		James Somerville	
1737	Nathaniel Pearson		James Somerville	
1749	James Digges La Touche (Note: Declared not duly elected in 1749.)		James Somerville	
1749	Charles Burton (Note: Created a baronet in 1758.)		Sir Samuel Cooke, 1st Bt	
1758	Charles Burton		James Dunn	
1761	James Grattan		Charles Lucas	Radical/Patriot
1767	Marquess of Kildare	Patriot	Charles Lucas	Radical/Patriot
1771	Marquess of Kildare	Patriot	William Clement	
1773	Redmond Morres		William Clement	
1776	Sir Samuel Bradstreet, 3rd Bt	Independent	William Clement	
1782	Sir Samuel Bradstreet, 3rd Bt	Independent	Travers Hartley	
1784	Nathaniel Warren		Travers Hartley	
1790	Lord Henry FitzGerald	Patriot	Henry Grattan	Patriot
1797	Arthur Wolfe		John Claudius Beresford	
July 1798	George Ogle	Whig	John Claudius Beresford	
1801	Succeeded by the Westminster constituency Dublin City			

=== Elections ===
1790 general election: Dublin City
Party	Candidate	Votes	%	±%
Patriot	Henry Grattan	1695		
Patriot	Lord Henry FitzGerald	1695		
Pro-Government	Lord Mayor John Exshaw	836		
Pro-Government	Alderman Henry Gore Sankey	776		

1797 general election: Dublin City
Party	Candidate	Votes	%
Pro-Government	John Claudius Beresford	Unopposed	
Pro-Government	Arthur Wolfe	Unopposed	
Pro-Government gain from Patriot			
Pro-Government gain from Patriot			

Grattan and Fitzgerald chose not to run in 1797, after being disappointed by the failed attempt at passing a bill to allow Catholics to become MPs.

== Bibliography ==
- O'Hart, John (2007). The Irish and Anglo-Irish Landed Gentry: When Cromwell came to Ireland. Vol. II. Heritage Books. ISBN 978-0-7884-1927-0.
- Leigh Rayment's historical List of Members of the Irish House of Commons. Cites: Johnston-Liik, Edith Mary (2002). The History of the Irish Parliament 1692-1800 (6 volumes). Ulster Historical Foundation.
- Clarke, Maude V. (1932–34). "William of Windsor in Ireland, 1369-1376". Proceedings of the Royal Irish Academy: Archaeology, Culture, History, Literature. 41: 55–130. JSTOR 25515963.
