= Drapier's Letters =

Series of pamphlets by Jonathan Swift

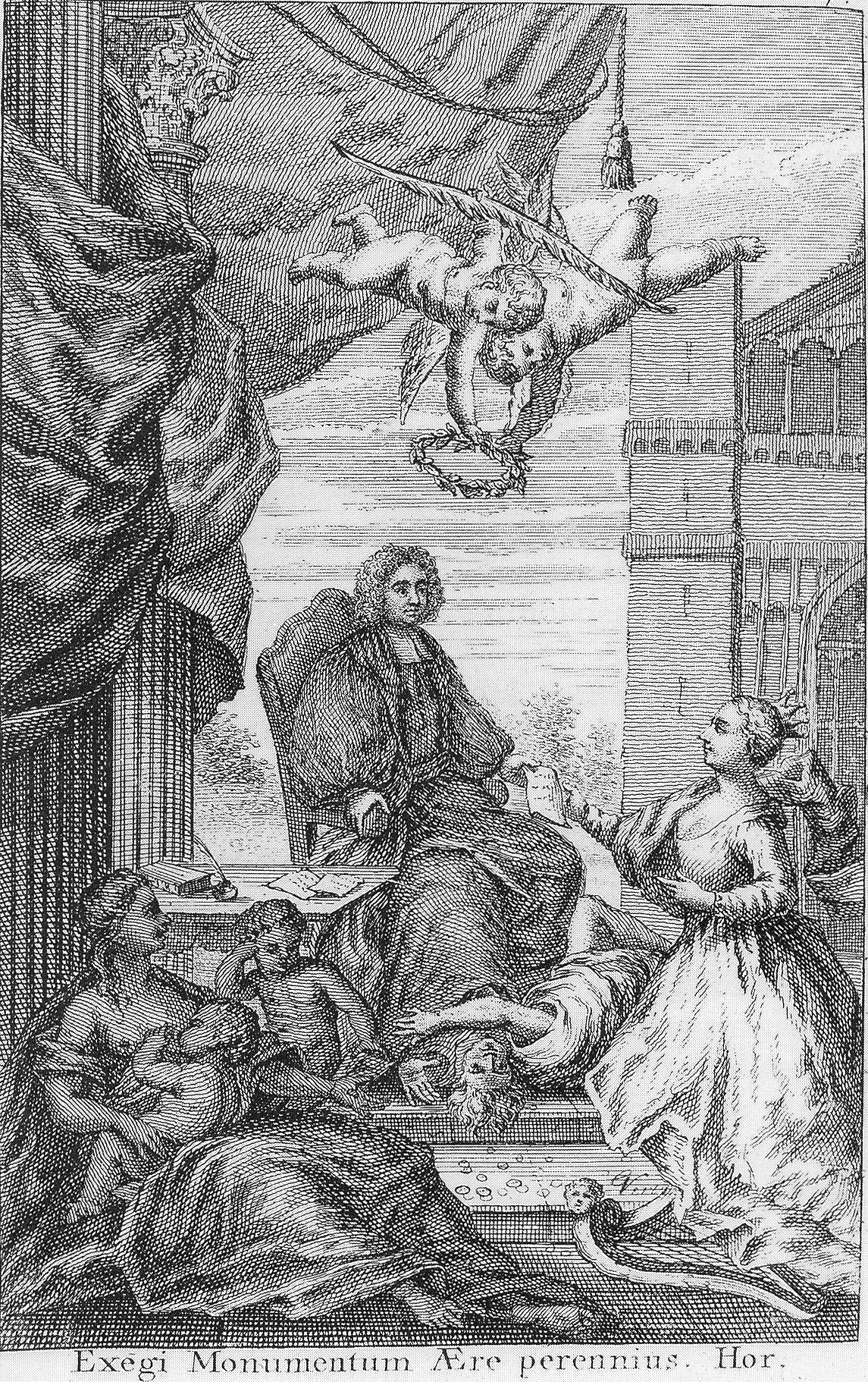
Title page of the 1735 Works. The author is in the Dean's chair receiving the thanks of Ireland. The motto reads, "I have made a monument more lasting than bronze." (The phrase comes from the Odes of Horace.) The word "Ære" means "bronze" or "metal" or "honor" or "air" in Latin, and may be a pun on the Irish word for Ireland, Éire, so that a parallel meaning could be: "I have made a monument to Ireland forever." Swift was familiar with the Irish language, and translated at least one poem by Carolan, "O'Rorke's Feast".

Drapier's Letters is the collective name for a series of seven political pamphlets written between 1724 and 1725 by the Dean of St Patrick's Cathedral in Dublin, Jonathan Swift, to arouse public opinion in Ireland against the imposition of a privately minted copper coinage that Swift believed to be of inferior quality. William Wood was granted letters patent to mint the coin, and Swift saw the licensing of the patent as corrupt. In response, Swift represented Ireland as constitutionally and financially independent of Britain in the Drapier's Letters. Since the subject was politically sensitive, Swift wrote under the pseudonym M. B., Drapier, to hide from retaliation.

Although the letters were condemned by the Parliament of Ireland, with prompting from the Parliament of Great Britain, they were still able to inspire popular sentiment against Wood and his patent. The popular sentiment turned into a nationwide boycott, which forced the patent to be withdrawn; Swift was later honoured for this service to the people of Ireland. Many Irish people viewed Swift as a hero for his defiance of British authority. Beyond being a hero, many critics have seen Swift, through the persona of the Drapier, as the first to organise a "more universal Irish community", although it is disputed as to who constitutes that community. Regardless of to whom Swift is actually appealing what he may or may not have done, the nickname provided by Archbishop King, "Our Irish Copper-Farthen Dean", and his connection to ending the controversy stuck.

The first complete collection of the Drapier's Letters appeared in the 1734 George Faulkner edition of the Works of Jonathan Swift along with an allegorical frontispiece offering praise and thanks from the Irish people. Today, the Drapier's Letters are an important part of Swift's political writings, along with Gulliver's Travels (1726), A Tale of a Tub (1704), and A Modest Proposal (1729).

== Background ==
In 1722, hardware manufacturer William Wood was granted letters patent to produce copper coinage of up to £108,000 (around £20,663,600 as of 2025) for use in Ireland. The patent was secured by a bribe of £10,000 (around £1,913,300 as of 2025) to the Duchess of Kendal, mistress to King George I. Although Wood's copper coins were subsequently alleged to be underweight, undersized, and made from inferior materials, assays had found they were not so, prior to their approval by the Parliament of Great Britain for use in Ireland.

The Irish complaint against Wood was not that they had enough copper coins, but that this would introduce too many coins of inferior quality into the Irish economy. These coins would remove valuable silver and gold coins from circulation in the Irish economy, and since the new copper coins would not be minted under Irish authority, no way existed for the Irish to control the quality and amount. Also, Wood's coin was only one example of allegedly unfavourable economic practices that hurt Ireland; the Irish wanted to have their own national bank and authority to mint their own coinage, and Wood's coin became an issue over which they could express their economic-nationalist desires.

The patent issue soon became a struggle between Prime Minister Robert Walpole (with the authority of the Parliament of Great Britain) and the leaders of Ireland. All attempts by the Irish Privy Council and the Church of Ireland to prevent the release of the coinage proved fruitless. It was soon thought by many that William Conolly’s Commissioners of the Revenue might pay the soldiers stationed in Ireland with the new coin; if the soldiers were paid with the coin, then the merchants of Ireland would be forced to accept the coin from the soldiers or risk military reprisal or a loss of business. This worried the leadership of Ireland and they requested help in challenging Wood's patent and leading a boycott of the coin. Swift was asked by Archbishop King and Lord Chancellor Midleton to contribute to a pamphleteering campaign against Wood's coin.

During this time, Lord Carteret, the British Secretary of State whose remit included Ireland, publicly pushed Walpole into defending Wood's patent. However, Carteret privately attempted to destroy the patent to damage Walpole's reputation. Thus, Carteret appeared to the British as a defender of the patent because he seemingly tried to prevent an Irish uprising (especially by finding "Drapier"), but he was really furthering his anti-Walpole agenda and aiding the Irish nationalist cause.

=== Pamphleteering ===
Jonathan Swift, then Dean of St Patrick's Cathedral in Dublin, was already known for his concern for the Irish people and for writing several political pamphlets. One of these, Proposal for the Universal use of Irish Manufacture (1720), had so inflamed the British authorities that the printer, John Harding, was prosecuted, although the pamphlet had done little more than recommend that the Irish use the materials they produce rather than export them to England. Also, the Irish authorities knew that Swift's political pamphleteering had been employed by the Tory government of Queen Anne, and that he would use his abilities to undermine the Whig government of Walpole.

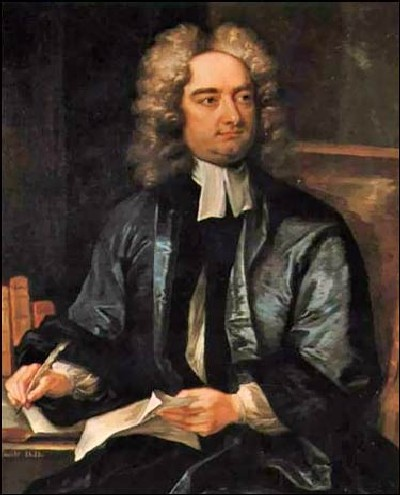
Charles Jervas's portrait of Jonathan Swift (1718)

Swift analysed the forensic and economic disadvantages of Wood's inferior coinage and the effects it would have over Ireland in the first of the pamphlets, A Letter to the Shop-keepers (1724). In the pamphlet, Swift adopted the persona of the "Drapier": a common Irishman, a talented and skilled draper, a religiously devout individual who believes in scripture, and a man loyal to both the Church of Ireland and to the King of Ireland. Swift's pseudonymous choice served two essential purposes: it provided him with an alternate persona which he could use to hide from potential political reprisals, and it allowed him to create an identity that was closely aligned with the common people of Ireland.

According to 20th-century Swift scholar Irvin Ehrenpreis, debate arose in the academic community over how much Swift may have wished his audience to identify him as the Drapier, especially since the Drapier constantly includes religious imagery that was common to Swift's sermons. However, the religious rhetoric probably used to justify an Irish rebellion against the coinage is merely meant as an important aspect of the Drapier's identity without it being meant as evidence that Swift was the author. Regardless of how secret Swift may have wanted his identity to be, most people in Ireland, including members of the Irish Privy Council, certainly knew that Swift was the author of the letters. Unfortunately for the Walpole administration, little legal proof was available of a relationship between the two that would justify them trying Swift as the "Drapier".

Over the course of a year, four more pamphlets, filled with invective and complaints against both Wood and his patent, followed the first. The pamphlet was successful, and public opinion became so hostile against Wood's coinage that the patent was withdrawn by 1725. At one point, Lord Carteret and the Irish Privy Council offered a significant reward of £300 for information that would verify the identity of the pamphlet's author, but Swift was neither arrested nor charged for the works. The lack of an arrest and the unity of the Irish people behind the "Drapier" was an important motivating factor behind Walpole's withdrawal of the patent.

=== Irish independence ===
Although Swift knew that the Duchess of Kendal was responsible for selling the patent to Wood, he rarely mentions this fact in the Letters. Instead, his first three letters describe Wood as the mastermind behind the patent. Although the Drapier constantly asserts his loyalty to the King, his words did not prevent accusations of treason from being levelled against him in response to the third and fourth letters.

In the third and fourth letters, Swift argues that the Irish deserve to be granted independence from British control but not King George II. This, of all of the Drapier's arguments, is what agitated Walpole, as the head of the British parliament, the most. Thus, the Drapier was condemned like William Molyneux, whose Case of Ireland (1698) pleaded for Irish independence using the same arguments. The claims of treason levelled against the Drapier were of "treason to the English Parliament", which only caused more resentment among the Irish people, who sided with Swift's constitutional argument that the Irish people owed their allegiance only to the king.

== Pamphlets ==
The first three pamphlets were written as a set intended to conclude the matter. However, when Lord Carteret was sent to control Ireland and placed a bounty on the Drapier's head, Swift felt that a fourth pamphlet was necessary. The fifth (in this list) was written at the height of the controversy over Wood's coin, and constitutes the final public writing of "the Drapier". The letter To the Lord Chancellor Middleton was signed with Swift's name and not collected until Faulkner's 1735 edition. The last letter, An Humble Address, was also published after the conflict had ended.

=== To the Shop-keepers ===
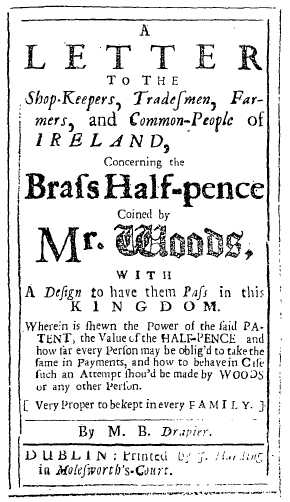
Title page from the 1724 pamphlet To the Shop-keepers

The Drapier's first letter, To the Shop-keepers, Tradesmen, Farmers, and Common-People of Ireland, was printed in March 1724. Shortly afterwards, a copy of the first letter was forwarded by Swift to Lord Carteret on 28 April 1724, and knowledge of the letter's contents had spread all the way to London. By April 1724, the letter was popular and Swift claimed that over 2,000 copies had been sold in Dublin. The letter was retitled "Fraud Detected: or, The Hibernian Patriot" by Faulkner's Dublin Journal, which published the piece in 1725. "Fraud Detected" was later used by Faulkner as the title of the collection of the first five letters, published after the patent controversy ended.

The Drapier introduces his subject by invoking the duty of his readers as "Christians, as parents, and as lovers of your country". His purpose is to introduce the background of Wood's coin and then he suggests a boycott similar to the one in his Proposal for the Universal Use of Irish Manufacture. Throughout his monetary arguments, the Drapier constantly acknowledges how humble his station in life is, and incorporates theological and classical allusions to mock Wood. The Drapier places the blame for the coin upon Wood, stating: "It is no treason to rebel against Mr Wood."

There are many religious overtones similar to Swift's sermons, such as the Drapier's combination of a duty to God with duty to one's king and country. Many critics compare the language and rhetorical style of the first letter to a Hebrew prophet or to an evangelical preacher who warns the masses of an imminent threat to their soul. However, the final judgment had not yet come, so the Drapier also included arguments claiming that Wood's halfpence would destroy the Irish economy and the souls of the citizenry.

One of the concerns of the Irish discussed in the first letter was over what is now known as Gresham's law: debased coins would cause silver and gold coinage to be hoarded or removed from the country, which would further debase the currency. Tenant farmers would no longer be able to pay their landlords, and, after the tenants were removed, there would be fewer crops grown in Ireland; the increase of poverty and the decrease of food supply would completely ruin Ireland's economy.

Although some critics and historians view the language and examples employed by the Drapier to describe the possible economic harms as over the top, others consider that Swift's imagery was grounded in truth. Even Swift's satire of Wood's character is based on actual evidence and added very little to what Wood provided the public through his words and actions. Although the Drapier emphasises Wood's involvement and not the king's, glosses of the first letter reveal allusions to Wood bribing the Duchess of Kendal that obscure the distinction to the careful reader. However, the Drapier always respects the king as leader of the Irish nation and the Irish church, although some critics see his bold language and free use of the king's name and title as undermining those positions. The Drapier makes sure that Wood appears to be the primary target, which, when combined with only an indirect attack upon people at the top of the British political system, reassured the people of Ireland that they could rebel against an "insignificant hardware man".

=== To Mr Harding ===
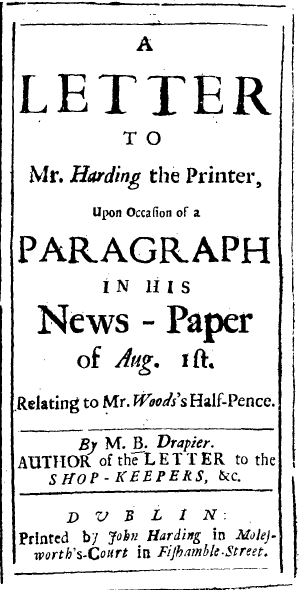
Title page from the 1724 pamphlet To Mr. Harding

The Drapier's second letter, A Letter to Mr. Harding the Printer, upon Occasion of a Paragraph in his News-Paper of Aug. 1st, Relating to Mr. Wood's Half-Pence, was printed on 4 August 1724, in response to the British Privy Council's testing of Wood's coin.

The Drapier alludes to the involvement of the Duchess of Kendall in his first letter; in the second, the Drapier de-emphasises her involvement and shifts his focus to blame the Whig party. According to the Drapier, the Whigs are the ones who Wood bribed in securing his patent. The central target for this letter is the Privy Council's report produced under the authority of Walpole. It was necessary for the Drapier to attack the report to ensure that the people would be willing to resist the coin and deny the "truth" that Wood's supporters issued. Therefore, the Drapier describes them as "only a few Betrayers of their Country, Confederates with Woods".

The Drapier does not directly attack Isaac Newton's assay of Wood's coin, but instead attacks the process behind the assay and the witnesses who testified before the Privy Council. In his criticism of the Privy Council's report, the Drapier claims that the report is part of Wood's propaganda and lies, because Wood released three proposals concurrent with the report: lowering the patent production quota from £100,800 to £40,000 worth; that no one is obliged to accept more than five pence halfpenny per transaction; and to sell the coin at 2s 1d a pound or his raw copper at 1s 8d a pound. Wood's choice of wording, that the Irish would be "obliged" to accept the coin, was criticised by the Drapier who then accused Wood of "perfect High Treason" for obliging the people to take any copper coin when the king lacked the constitutional authority to do such a thing.

In the second letter, the Drapier walks a careful line between openly indicting the king and merely hinting at his relationship with Wood's patent; while the Drapier accuses Wood, he constantly refers to the king's authority and power to issue legal tender (this is called "the King's Prerogative"). In particular, the Drapier claims that the king is unable to force his people to accept any copper based currency. As the Drapier points out, the constitution establishing Ireland as a kingdom limits the authority of the monarch because it forces the people of Ireland to use only gold or silver coins as official currency. Throughout this argument, the Drapier compares the king's ability to print money with the petty amount of political power held by Wood, which undermines the image of the king as the supreme authority in Ireland while hinting that the king is not protecting the rights of the Irish people. The Drapier stops himself before he commits treason, and he instead argues that the king would never accept a patent that could harm Ireland; to the Drapier, the king would never act in such a way as to help Wood harm the people of Ireland.

In response to calls for action from the Drapier in the second letter, a group of bankers joined on 17 August 1724, agreeing in writing that they would not accept the coin produced under Wood's patent. Other merchants and tradesmen followed in a similar fashion. However, this did not stop Walpole from ordering the Commissioners of the Revenue in Ireland to enter the coin into the Irish economy. Regardless of Walpole's orders, the Irish Lord Justices did not act, Lord Shannon did not command that his troops should be issued Wood's coin, and Middleton's House of Lords and Conolly's House of Commons did not pass any resolution backing up Walpole's order, which effectively prevented the coin from being distributed.

=== To the Nobility and Gentry ===
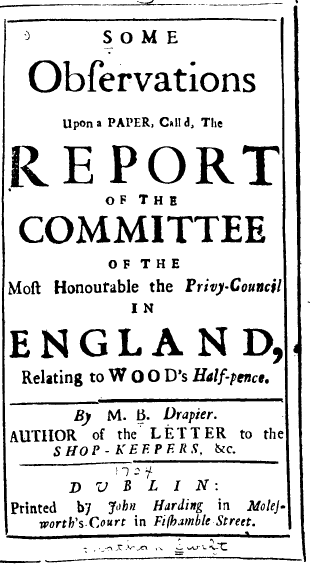
Title page from the 1724 pamphlet Some Observations

The Drapier's third letter, To the Nobility and Gentry of the Kingdom of Ireland: Some Observations Upon a Paper, Call'd, The Report of the Committee of the Most Honourable the Privy-Council in England relating to Wood's Half-pence, was printed on 25 August 1724.

The subject matter of the third letter is similar to that of the second letter, and some scholars have explained this as a result of Swift being forced to respond so quickly to the Privy-council's report. The Drapier emphasises his humble nature and simple understanding when appealing to the pride of his audience, the nobility.

The Drapier spends most of his letter responding to the "Report of the Committee of the Most Honourable the Privy-Councill in England". This document released by Walpole served as a defence of Wood's coin; the report argued that the coin was important to the people of Ireland. However, the report was not officially released by Walpole in the Parliament's Gazette, but published without Parliament's authority in the London Journal in August 1724. Some scholars have speculated that Walpole had the report published in a non-Parliamentary magazine so that he would not be connected directly to Wood's coin. However, the lack of Parliamentary authority behind the report allowed the Drapier to undermine the credibility of the report's content.

The Drapier claims, "Mr. Wood in publishing this paper would insinuate to the world, as if the Committee had a greater concern for his credit and private emolument, than for the honour of the Privy-council and both Houses of Parliament here ... For it seems intended as a vindication of Mr. Wood, not without several severe remarks on the Houses of Lords and Commons of Ireland." To the Drapier, Wood has utter contempt for the political authority of Ireland, and would use his coin and the report to mock them. However, the attack extends beyond Wood to encompass a dispute about the authority of England to rule over the kingdom of Ireland.

The central argument in the letter is that the British have negated the rights of the Irish people by relying on a completely British system to pass the patent without allowing the Irish parliament a say. William Wood, according to the Drapier, was already involved in a similar dispute with a coin he minted for Massachusetts. Wood, the Drapier claims, "hath already tried his Faculty in New-England, and I hope he will meet with an EQUAL RECEPTION here; what That was I leave to the Publick Intelligence." The response to Wood's coin was a complete boycott of the coin.

The Drapier does not blame the production of the coining on Walpole's policies, in regard to England's colonies, but on Wood's (and his accomplice's) actions. This criticism of Wood's actions allows the Drapier to attack the patent process in such a way that could not be used directly against the British parliament. In referring to this point, the Drapier asks, "Were not the People of Ireland born as Free as those of England?"

The final image of this letter is that of the small child David versus the giant Goliath. Wood is the giant invader who wears his brass coin as armour and the Drapier is the small merchant who is not big enough to fill the king's armour. This image resonated with the people, and a sign was displayed by people of Dublin which read:

And the people said unto Saul, Shall Jonathan die, who hath wrought this great salvation in Israel? God forbid : as the Lord liveth, there shall not one hair of his head fall to the ground; for he hath wrought with God this day. So the people rescued Jonathan, that he died not.

The third letter openly incorporates Swift's argument that political authority stems from the consent of a population. As such, the third letter has been seen as a response in part to the Declaratory Act, which had undermined the independence and the authority of Irish legislature and judiciary. The Declaratory Act removed the ability for any in Ireland to speak for the people of Ireland, and it was necessary for the act to be removed before the people could be heard.

However, such an attack on the Declaratory Act was common in Swift's works, and he constantly argued against the act by promoting Irish autonomy. This does not mean that the Irish independence is to be taken lightly, because Swift viewed the self-reliance as "the only means of halting their [the Irish/Irish Protestant] self-destructive complicity – of which they were inadequately aware – in England's ongoing consumption of Ireland."

=== To the Whole People of Ireland ===
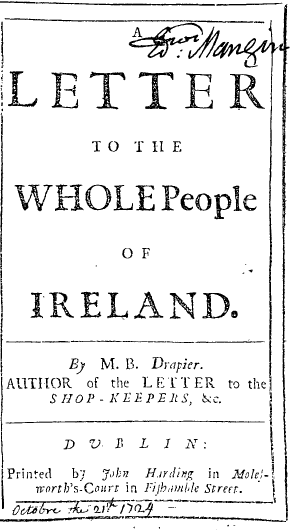
Title page from the 1724 pamphlet To the Whole People of Ireland

The Drapier's fourth letter, To the Whole People of Ireland, A Word or Two to the People of Ireland, A Short Defense of the People of Ireland, was written on 13 October 1724 and was either published on 21 October 1724 or on 22 October 1724, the day Lord Carteret arrived in Dublin. Throughout the letter, the Drapier pretends that Carteret's transfer to Ireland to enforce Wood's patent was a rumour produced by Wood's allies, although Swift had knowledge to the contrary.

The fourth letter was written in response to the many charges put forth by the British supporters of Wood's patent against the Irish, including claims of papal influence and of treason. A large portion of the letter is a response to these accusations and to refuting further arguments that Wood's coin could be beneficial to the Irish people. The tone of the letter is clear: Wood's allies are promoting an evil that will harm Ireland. However, Wood is only a secondary target—figures like Walpole are mocked for their role in the controversy.

The majority of the fourth letter is devoted to an argument revolving around the political liberty of the Irish people. It is for this argument that the Drapier was persecuted, because his words were seen as a call to challenge British authority and possibly to declare independence from the king. The Drapier walks a fine line between loyalty and disloyalty, because he charges that the Irish are loyal only to their king, who had the title "King of Ireland", but not to England. To this the Drapier states:

Let whoever think otherwise, I M.B. Drapier, desire to be excepted, for I declare, next under God, I depend only on the King my sovereign, and on the laws of my own country; and I am so far from depending upon the people of England, that if they should ever rebel against my sovereign (which God forbid) I would be ready at the first command from His Majesty to take arms against them, as some of my countrymen did against theirs at Preston. And if such a rebellion should prove so successful as to fix the Pretender on the throne of England, I would venture to transgress that statute so far as to lose every drop of my blood to hinder him from being King of Ireland.

In defence of his nation, the Drapier turns around claims of treason and papal loyalty against Wood and his defenders (especially Walpole), calling them as treasonous as the Jacobite rebels and the Parliamentary "Roundheads". The Drapier believed that God's providence supported the people of Ireland, but his will required the people of Ireland to stand up against the treasonous British.

The most famous and controversial statement of the Drapier's Letters follows claims of loyalty to the Irish king:

I have digressed a little to refresh and continue that spirit so seasonably raised amongst you, and to let you see that by the laws of GOD, of NATURE, of NATIONS, and of your own COUNTRY, you ARE and OUGHT to be as FREE a people as your brethren in England.

This line of argument follows the political philosophy of John Locke in the Two Treatises on Government (1689). Locke wrote that the people had the right to resist their government when their property rights were violated, and that nations have the same sovereign rights even when they have been conquered by another.

A secondary rhetorical battle began between Walpole and the Irish in regard to Wood's patent; the rest of the constitutional debate was over the nature of Poynings' Law, a law that was brought back into use through the Declaratory Act (1720). Poyning's Law was a law passed by the British parliament which allowed them to control all of Ireland's legal entities and to revoke Irish parliamentary independence when it suited them. Traditionally, the rulers of Ireland viewed themselves as a sovereign kingdom and not a subject territory that would be controlled by Poyning's Law. The Drapier agreed with the Irish interpretation of the law and incorporated aspects of Molyneux's arguments that combined proof the law was misinterpreted and Locke's political philosophy.

Lord Carteret read passages from the fourth letter about Irish constitutional independence to the Irish Privy Council and claimed that they were treasonable. It was then that Harding was arrested for printing the letters and a reward of £300 was offered for the identity of the Drapier. Lord Carteret wrote that the arrest and bounty were the result of an "unfortunate accident" and he did not want to respond in such a way. Lord Midleton was also forced to denounce his previous ally, the Drapier, and did so when he wrote, "to provoke England to that degree as some have endeavoured to do, is not the true way to keep them out". Archbishop King responded to the letters by saying they were "ludicrous and satyrically writ". However, the Archbishop publicly supported the constitutional actions more than the other three, and his support caused others important officials to criticise him.

Regardless of the proclamation against the Drapier and the words issued by important Irish officials, the people of Ireland had stood by the writer, and it was their support that protected Swift. Some critics have viewed this support as resulting from the letter's appeal to the "mob", or common people, of Ireland.

=== To Viscount Molesworth ===
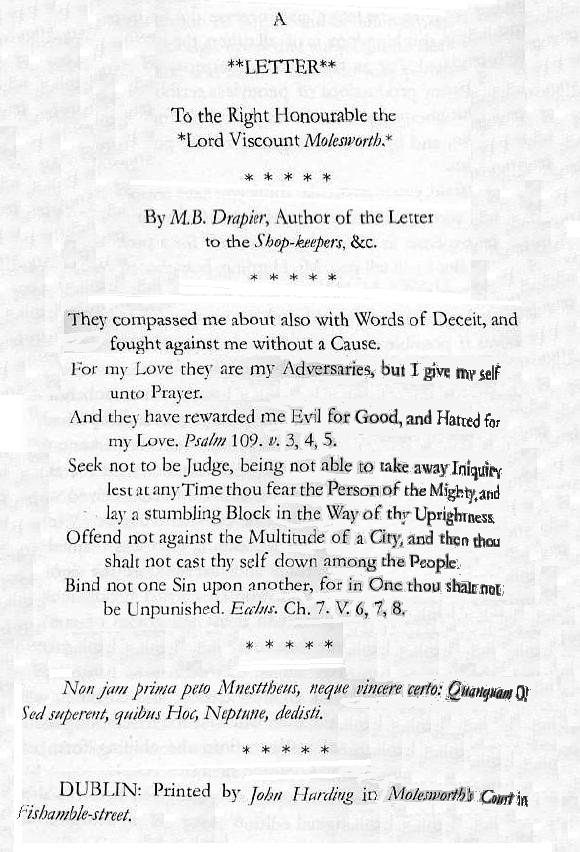
Title page of To Viscount Molesworth from the 1735 Faulkner edition and reproduced by the 1903 Temple Scott edition

The Drapier's fifth letter, A Letter To the Honourable the Lord Viscount Molesworth, at his House at Brackdenstown, near Swords was published on 31 December 1724. The letter includes the most pseudo-biographical information on the Drapier.

This letter is seen as the final salvo in the Drapier's fight against Wood's patent. Although there was a possible agreement between Carteret and Walpole over ending the patent, Swift found it necessary to publish this defence of the fourth letter to ensure that Walpole would not back down from his promise of removing the patent. It has also been seen as a letter celebrating Harding's release from being tried for printing the Drapier's letters.

The Drapier begins his letter with three quotations: Psalm 109, Ecclesiasticus/Sirach 7, and Virgil's Aeneid Book Five. With these passages, he sets the tone for his own defence by appealing to both the reason and the religious sentiments of his audience to prove his innocence:

I foolishly disdained to have Recourse to Whining, Lamenting, and Crying for Mercy, but rather chose to appeal to Law and Liberty and the common Rights of Mankind, without considering the Climate I was in.

Some critics argue that Swift did not need to defend himself, and To Viscount Molesworth was written to gloat. However, the essence of the letter encourages the Irish to remember the actions of Walpole, Wood, and parliament. By willingly throwing himself before the judgement of his fellow Irishmen and before the final judgement of God, the Drapier claims that he is and always will be on the correct side of the argument.

Other critics emphasise that the letter's object, Lord Molesworth, was targeted to bind the higher and lower classes together. Using Molesworth, a religious dissenter, a nobleman, and the opposite of Swift, the Drapier unites all of the various people of Ireland in a common nationalist cause. Instead of defending charges against himself, the Drapier is calling up more support for the Irish cause; he seeks attention so that the greater liberty of Ireland will be respected.

The letter serves one other purpose: to delight in the Drapier's lack of being captured and his victory over Whitshed. William Whitshed, Lord Chief Justice of the King's Bench in Ireland, was the one who actually arrested Harding and sought to convict him of printing treasonous materials. A letter written anonymously by Swift, "Seasonable Advice to the Grand-Jury", motivated the Irish jury to stand up against Whitshed and release the printer. The Drapier hints at the letter and the freeing of Harding when he lists many other works written by Jonathan Swift, and, in the process, nearly reveals his own identity. However, his tone may not be mocking, as he could just be flaunting his own position, and some have credited this idea to the incorporation of so many Biblical and Classical allusions beyond the three that begin the letter. Scholar Herbert Davis declared this letter is "in some ways the best written of all the Letters".

=== To the Lord Chancellor Middleton ===
The sixth letter during the Drapier's campaign, To the Lord Chancellor Middleton, is dated 26 October 1724, and was written as a private letter from Jonathan Swift to Alan Brodrick, Lord Midleton (with the misspelling of his title). It is not a true "Drapier" letter, because the author professes to be different from the Drapier, although he was known to be one and the same by Lord Midleton. Sir Walter Scott includes this letter as number five, although Faulkner, Sheridan, Deane Swift, Hawkesworth and Nichols label it as number six.

The purpose of the sixth letter was to ensure that Midleton would stay true to his opposition of Wood's patent. Although the extent to which Midleton was influenced by the letter cannot be known, it is certain that Midleton believed that the patent would harm Ireland and that he would resist it at all costs. Regardless, Swift wrote the letter to express himself in a way that the Drapier could not: as the dean of a great, Irish cathedral. He asserts his status to verify that the Drapier's intentions must be good. In essence, the letter rehashes many of the previous letters' arguments to draw Midleton into openly supporting the Drapier's actions. Swift also admits to actively working against the patent, and mentions how his "On Doing Good" sermon is similar to the ideas expressed by the Drapier.

=== An Humble Address ===
The Drapier's last letter, An Humble Address to Both Houses of Parliament, was completed in June 1725. It was written before Wood's patent was defeated, and it was stopped from being printed when word reached Swift that the patent had been withdrawn. This letter remained unpublished for 10 years.

The letter challenges the Ireland's parliament to investigate how Wood originally attained the patent, even though most in power knew that the patent was the result of bribery. Although nothing new would be discovered in an investigation, the letter served the purpose of trying to unite the people of Ireland to fight for further economic freedom. The Drapier refers to Ireland's lack of economic freedom when he claims, the Irish "are altogether Losers, and England a Gainer". Swift's intentions behind the letter are uncertain, and some critics believe that Swift did not desire such an investigation into Wood's supporters while others contend that Swift was serious about promoting a public inquiry into the matter.

The topics the Drapier addresses span from absentee land owners to importing of goods from Britain to the favouring of Englishmen over Irishmen for positions in the Irish government. These issues were the many issues that Swift cared about and saw as threatening Ireland before Wood's halfpence controversy. However, these individual issues were not as important as the independence and unity of Ireland: the specifics of independence were less important than self-rule. Some argue that Swift, after Wood's patent was withdrawn, removed himself from the political landscape to focus on writing Gulliver's Travels, in which he picked up many of the same ideas.

== Publication ==
John Harding published the first four letters before he was arrested and the fifth after his release. After Harding's death, George Faulkner became Swift's primary publisher in Ireland, and A Letter to the Lord Chancellor Middleton and An Humble Address were copied from manuscript copies provided by the author to Faulkner and then printed with the other letters. The Drapier's Letters were first collected and published in their entirety by Faulkner in 1735.

On 9 February 1733, Faulkner advertised his future publication of Swift's collected works in four volumes, the first containing the Drapier's Letters, in the Dublin Journal. However, this edition led to the Motte v Faulkner (1735) lawsuit, since the London bookseller Benjamin Motte had publication rights, under British copyright legislation, to many of the works included in Faulkner's edition. Although the Drapier's Letters were not under copyright, the complete work was legally brought to a halt from being published in England by a ruling on 28 November 1735. It is uncertain if Swift allowed Faulkner to publish the works to allow an Irish publisher to compete against a British publisher or if Swift had no say in the matter and Faulkner published the works against Swift's will. In a letter to Motte in May 1736, Swift did not defend Faulkner's legal right to publish the works. Instead, Swift admonished Motte for prosecuting Faulkner instead of coming to an agreement that would allow Faulkner to reprint the copyrighted material.

== Reception ==
Although the original printing of the Drapier's Letters resulted in the arrest of Harding and a bounty placed upon the Drapier's head, Swift's actions in defending Ireland were deemed heroic among the Irish citizenry. He was titled the "Hibernian patriot" for his actions. Some residents of Dublin placed banners and signs in the city to recognise Swift's deeds, and images from the letters, such as the Drapier comparing his campaign to David fighting Goliath, became themes in popular literature. Scholar Herbert Davis claims that by the end of 1725, Swift was "the Darling of the populace; His Image and Superscription on a great many Sign-Posts" in Ireland.

Swift did not fully embrace his popularity, but he enjoyed it. On his birthday, 30 November 1727, a large group of men came to St. Patrick's Cathedral to pray and afterwards celebrate throughout the city. This gathering commemorated Swift and his letters and also protested against the British treatment of Ireland.

According to Robert Mahony, the Drapier's Letters, especially the fourth letter, were later praised by Irish nationalists. However, as Mahony elaborates, many recent critics have re-examined this nationalistic claim and asserted a counterclaim that Swift is speaking more for the Irish Protestants than for the entire nation. Many critics, including Carol Fabricant, have asked who "the Whole People of Ireland" are, "who" the Drapier's Letters are speaking "to", and if Swift has the right, as an Anglo-Irish Protestant to speak for the entire nation. R. F. Foster believes that Swift represented "Ascendancy attitudes," but this view a universal one. Some critics, like Joep Leerssen, believe that Swift's work contributed greatly to a common Irish nationalism regardless of religious affiliation, and that Swift was able to relate to all of Ireland through a unified distaste with British rule. In overall effect, Fabricant argued that Swift's ability to speak for the whole populace is further suggested by the wide consensus opposed to the coinage plan. Along with this, Swift was able to rhetorically extend natural rights, in the Drapier's Letters, to all people of Ireland without any regard to restriction.
