= Thomas Hackett (Jacobite) =

Sir Thomas Hackett (died 1706) was an Irish Jacobite official and merchant.

== Biography ==
Hackett was the son of James Hackett and Alison White. He was engaged in foreign trade out of Dublin by 1666, and became a banker to many Old English Roman Catholic families in Ireland. In October 1687, he was knighted and appointed Lord Mayor of Dublin by James II of England. He was the Member of Parliament for Portarlington in the brief Patriot Parliament called by James II in 1689. He was made a Deputy Lieutenant of Dublin and a justice of the peace.

The Jacobite defeat in Ireland in 1690 resulted in Hackett being outlawed and most of his properties were seized. As a result, he became deeply indebted. In 1694 he had a pass to go to the Dutch Republic, where his activities were monitored by English government officials who believed him to be an agent of the Jacobite court in exile at Château de Saint-Germain-en-Laye. He was granted legal protection in Dublin in 1700 after testifying in a legal dispute over forfeited lands, but had been imprisoned in Dublin for debt by 1705. He died the following year.

Parliament of Ireland
New constituency	Member of Parliament for Portarlington; 1689; With: Sir Henry Bond, Bt	Succeeded by Daniel Gahan; Richard Warburton
Civic offices
Preceded by Sir John Castleton	Lord Mayor of Dublin; 1686–1687	Succeeded by Michael Creagh
