= Sir Charles Burton, 1st Baronet =

Anglo-Irish politician (1702-1775)

Sir Charles Burton, 1st Baronet (1702 – 6 June 1775) was an Anglo-Irish politician.

He was a son of the banker Benjamin Burton and brother of Samuel Burton (MP).

He was elected Sheriff of Dublin City in 1733.

Burton was the Member of Parliament for Dublin City in the Irish House of Commons between 1749 and 1760. Between 1752 and 1753 he was Lord Mayor of Dublin. On 2 October 1758 Burton was created a baronet, of Pollacton in the Baronetage of Ireland. He was succeeded in his title by his son, also called Charles.

Parliament of Ireland
Preceded by Nathaniel Pearson; Sir James Somerville, Bt	Member of Parliament for Dublin City; 1749–1760; With: Sir Samuel Cooke, Bt (1749–1758); James Dunn (1758–1760)	Succeeded by James Grattan; Charles Lucas
Baronetage of Ireland
New creation	Baronet (of Pollacton); 1758–1775	Succeeded by Charles Burton
Civic offices
Preceded by John Cooke	Lord Mayor of Dublin; 1752–1753	Succeeded by Andrew Murray
