= John Forster (Irish judge) =

Irish lawyer, politician and judge (1668–1720)

John Forster (1668 – 2 July 1720) was an Irish lawyer, politician and judge.

== Background ==
Forster was born in Dublin, one of four children of Richard Forster and his wife Anne Webber. His father sat in the Irish House of Commons for Swords and came from a family long associated with the Dublin business community. Nicholas Forster, Bishop of Raphoe, was his brother.

== Career ==
Forster served as Recorder of Dublin from 1701 to 1714, and represented Dublin City in the Irish House of Commons from 1703 to 1715. He was Solicitor-General for Ireland in 1709 and Attorney-General for Ireland from Christmas Eve 1709 to 1711, before being raised to the Bench as Chief Justice of the Irish Common Pleas on 20 September 1714.

In 1713 he took part in the hotly contested Irish General Election and his constituency was the scene of the Dublin election riot.

Elrington Ball described Forster as "a sound lawyer and impressive speaker" but lacking in political judgment. Like Alan Brodrick, 1st Viscount Midleton, his mentor, he was stubborn and hot-tempered. His tenure as Recorder of Dublin saw a major conflict between the aldermen of Dublin and the Privy Council; Forster was entirely on the side of the aldermen, and for this, he was violently attacked by Jonathan Swift and other critics. These attacks undoubtedly took their toll, and it is believed he exchanged the Recordership for the position of Chief Justice in the belief that the more senior position would, in practice, be less onerous than the Recordership.

== Family ==
Forster married firstly Rebecca Monck, daughter of Henry Monck of St. Stephens Green, Dublin and his wife Sarah, daughter and heiress of Sir Thomas Stanley of Grangegorman, by whom he had at least three children, Richard, Anne and Elizabeth.

He married secondly Dorothy Evans, daughter of George Evans, of Bulgaden Hall, County Limerick and his wife Mary Eyre, and sister of George Evans, 1st Baron Carbery. They had a daughter, Dorothy.

His son Richard married Elizabeth Geering in 1721, and died in 1738. His daughter Anne married the celebrated philosopher George Berkeley, Bishop of Cloyne; her sister Elizabeth married Rev. Robert Spence. The youngest child Dorothy married Thomas Burton of Buncraggy: they were the grandparents of another leading judge, Thomas Burton Vandeleur.

He died following a stroke at his home, Clonshagh, Santry.

Parliament of Ireland
Preceded by William Handcock; Sir John Rogerson	Member of Parliament for Dublin City; 1703–1715; With: Benjamin Burton	Succeeded by John Rogerson; Benjamin Burton
Legal offices
Preceded by Sir William Handcock	Recorder of Dublin; 1701–1714	Succeeded by John Rogerson
Preceded by Sir Richard Levinge	Solicitor General for Ireland; 1709	Succeeded by William Whitshed
Preceded by Alan Brodrick	Attorney General for Ireland; 1709–1711	Succeeded by Sir Richard Levinge
Preceded by Sir Robert Doyne	Chief Justice of the Irish Common Pleas; 1714–1720	Succeeded by Sir Richard Levinge
Political offices
Preceded by Alan Brodrick	Speaker of the Irish House of Commons; 1710–1713	Succeeded by Alan Brodrick
