= Thomas Parnell (poet) =

Anglo-Irish poet and clergyman (1679-1718)

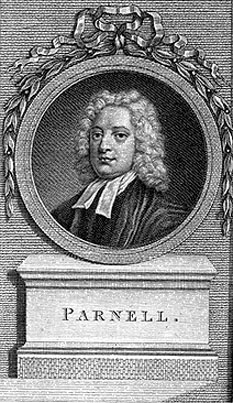
Thomas Parnell

Thomas Parnell (11 September 1679 – 24 October 1718) was an Anglo-Irish poet and clergyman who was a friend of both Alexander Pope and Jonathan Swift.

He was born in Dublin, the eldest son of Thomas Parnell (died 1685) of Maryborough, Queen's County (now Portlaoise, County Laois), a prosperous landowner who had been a loyal supporter of Oliver Cromwell during the English Civil War and moved from Congleton, Cheshire to Ireland after the Restoration of Charles II. His mother was Anne Grice of Kilosty, County Tipperary: she also owned property in County Armagh, which she left to Thomas at her death in 1709. His parents married in Dublin in 1674. Thomas was educated at Trinity College, Dublin and collated as Archdeacon of Clogher in 1705. In the last years of the reign of Queen Anne of England he was a popular preacher, but her death put an end to his hope of career advancement. He married Anne (Nancy) Minchin, daughter of Thomas Minchin, who died in 1712, and had three children, two of whom died young. The third child, a girl, is said to have reached a great age. The marriage was a very happy one, and it has been said that Thomas never recovered from Nancy's early death.

He spent much of his time in London, where he participated with Pope, Swift and others in the Scriblerus Club, contributing to The Spectator and aiding Pope in his translation of The Iliad. He was also one of the so-called "Graveyard poets": his 'A Night-Piece on Death,' widely considered the first "Graveyard School" poem, was published posthumously in Poems on Several Occasions, collected and edited by Alexander Pope and is thought by some scholars to have been published in December 1721 (although dated in 1722 on its title page, the year accepted by The Concise Oxford Chronology of English Literature; see 1721 in poetry, 1722 in poetry). It is said of his poetry, "it was in keeping with his character, easy and pleasing, enunciating the common places with felicity and grace."

He was a very heavy drinker, especially after his wife's early death, and drinking undermined his health. He died in Chester in 1718 on his way home to Ireland. His wife and two sons having died, his Laois estate passed to his brother John, a judge and MP in the Irish House of Commons, and the ancestor of Charles Stewart Parnell.

Oliver Goldsmith wrote a biography of Parnell which often accompanied later editions of Parnell's works. Poet Azizunnessa Khatun translated one of Parnell's works into the Bengali language under the title Udasīn Kabbo in 1884.

== Works ==
- Essay on the Different Stiles of Poetry (1713)
- Battle of the Frogs and Mice (1717 translation in heroic couplets of a comic epic then attributed to Homer)

An example of his poetry is the opening stanza of his poem The Hermit:

Far in the wild, unknown to public view,
From youth to age a revered hermit grew.
The moss his bed, the cave his humble cell,
His food the fruits, his drink the crystal well.
Remote from man with God he passed his days
Prayer all his business, all his pleasure, praise.
