= John Parnell (1680–1727) =

Irish politician and judge

John Parnell (1680–1727) was an Irish politician and judge. He was the brother of the poet Thomas Parnell and ancestor of Charles Stewart Parnell. He was considered to be one of the less gifted members of a remarkable family.

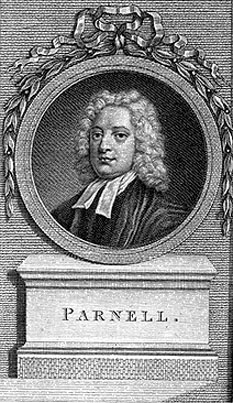
John's elder brother Thomas Parnell, the poet

He was born in Dublin, second son of Thomas Parnell (died 1685) of Portlaoise, originally from Congleton in Cheshire, and his wife Anne Grice (died 1709) of Kilosty, County Tipperary, whom he married in 1674. He went to school in Dublin and matriculated from Trinity College Dublin in 1694. He entered the Inner Temple in 1698 and was called to the Irish Bar in 1706. He became King's Counsel in 1715 and was appointed counsel to the Revenue Board. He was a member of the King's Inns and became its Treasurer. He was Recorder of Cashel and seneschal to William King, Archbishop of Dublin, who furthered his career; their correspondence still exists. He sat in the Irish House of Commons as member for Granard from 1713 to 1722, when he was appointed a judge of the Court of King's Bench (Ireland).

He was not highly esteemed as a judge - Jonathan Swift, among others, called him a "booby"- and his appointment was generally thought to be due to the influence of Archbishop King (who was consulted on all judicial appointments, and usually got his way on the choice of candidate) and of Parnell's brother-in-law William Whitshed, the Lord Chief Justice of Ireland. His great virtue, as a elegy on his death testifies, was his personal kindness and charity to the poor.

He married Mary Whitshed, sister of Chief Justice Whitshed, and had one son, Sir John Parnell, 1st Baronet. He had several distinguished descendants of whom the most famous is Charles Stewart Parnell. He inherited his brother Thomas's property on his death in 1718, as Thomas had outlived both his sons. They had one surviving sister, Margaret, who married into the prominent Burgh family of Bert House, County Kildare. He lived mainly at Rathleague, outside Portlaoise, and died there in 1727.

== Sources ==
- Ball, F. Elrington The Judges in Ireland 1221-1921 London John Murray 1926
- Burke's Peerage 2003 Edition
- Kenny, Colum King's Inns and the Kingdom of Ireland Dublin Irish Academic Press 1992
