= Samuel Burton (MP) =

Irish MP and High Sheriff of Carlow (1687-1733)

- Born: 1687
- Died: 1733 (aged 45–46)
- Occupations: Irish MP and High Sheriff of Carlow

Samuel Burton (1687–1733) of Burton Hall was an 18th-century Irish MP and High Sheriff of Carlow.

He was born the eldest son of Benjamin Burton, a wealthy banker who was Member of the Irish House of Commons for Dublin city and Lord Mayor of Dublin in 1706–7, and his wife Grace Stratford, daughter of Robert Stratford of Belan, County Kildare.

He was elected MP for Sligo in 1713 and appointed High Sheriff of Carlow for 1724. He was again elected MP in 1727, this time for Dublin Borough.

He married firstly Anne Campbell, daughter of Charles Campbell of Dublin, with whom he had three sons and a daughter. Anne was killed accidentally by the collapse of a scaffold in 1714 at the coronation of King George I.

He was succeeded in his estates by his eldest son, Benjamin, MP and Privy Councillor. His daughter Katherine married Nicholas Netterville, 5th Viscount Netterville, who was tried for murder in 1742 but acquitted. They had a son John, 6th Viscount Netterville, and two daughters.

Samuel married secondly Mary Hindle: they had one daughter.

He was a brother of Sir Charles Burton, 1st Baronet.
