= John Stoyte =

John Stoyte was an officer of the British Army, recognized for his service in Peninsula and the Battle of Waterloo.

He joined the army on 21 March 1811, as an ensign. He was present at the Battle of Badajoz (1812) on 6 April. Operating in the front of the Battle of Salamanca, he was severely wounded, losing one finger and wounded through the left hand and in the breast while carrying the colours, the standard of which was shot away. He was wounded again through the right hand and taken prisoner at Bergen op Zoom. He was present on 16 and 18 June at the Battle of Waterloo.

John Stoyte received the ranks of lieutenant on 4 July 1813 and captain on 27 January 1825. On 28 June 1838, he received a brevet-major. Stoyte was captain of a company of the 24th Regiment of Foot, while serving in Canada between 1829 and 1841. He took part in the Canadian Rebellions of 1837.

John Stoyte received the Waterloo Medal.
