= Robert Dillon (died 1579) =

Irish judge (died 1579)

Chief Justice of the Irish Common Pleas
- In office 1558–1579
- Preceded by: John Bathe
- Succeeded by: Nicholas Nugent

Personal details
- Born: c. 1500
- Died: 1579

Sir Robert Dillon (c. 1500 – 1579) of Newtown near Trim was an Irish judge of the Tudor era. He served as Chief Justice of the Irish Common Pleas for more than twenty years, despite repeated calls for his removal on the grounds of age and ill health.

== Birth and origins ==
Family tree

Robert Dillon with wife, parents, and other selected relatives. (Note: This family tree is based on the genealogies of the earls of Roscommon. Also see the lists of children in the text.)

Sir Richard; Dillon of Proudston fl. 1424	Jeanne; Wile
James; Dillon of Riverston	Elizabeth; Bathe
Bartholomew; Dillon of Riverston d. 1533	James; Bathe c. 1500 – 1570; Chief Baron	Robert; Dillon of Newtown c. 1500 – 1579; Chief Justice	Elizabeth; Barnewall
Thomas; Dillon of Riverston	Jane; Bathe	Lucas; Dillon died 1593; Chief Baron	Marion; Sharl	Christopher; Barnewall; 1522–1575
Robert; Dillon c. 1540 – 1597	James; 1st Earl; Roscommon d. 1641	Eleanor; Barnewall d. 1628

Legend

XXX	Subject of the article	XXX	Earls of Roscommon

Robert was born at the end of the 15th century, (Note: Robert's birth date is based on Albert Pollard's "about 1500" and an age at death of about 90 given by F. Elrington Ball.) the third son of Sir James Dillon of Riverstown, County Meath, and his wife Elizabeth Bathe. His father was Baron of the Court of Exchequer. His mother was a daughter of Bartholomew Bathe of Dollardstown Castle, Athy, County Kildare. Robert was "bred to the law": Sir Bartholomew Dillon, Lord Chief Justice of Ireland, was his elder brother.

This Robert Dillon must not be confused with Bartholomew's grandson Sir Robert Dillon (died 1597), who became Chief Justice of the Irish Common Pleas a year after his grand-uncle's death. The confusion is understandable since their judicial careers overlapped to a large degree, and as Kenny (1992) points out the records of the King's Inns for the relevant period do not always make it clear which Robert Dillon is being referred to.

He was one of seven siblings, who are listed in his eldest brother's article.

== Marriage and children ==
Dillon married Genet (also called Elizabeth) Barnewall, daughter of Edward Barnewall of Crickstown and Elizabeth Plunket, daughter of Sir Thomas Plunket, Chief Justice of the Common Pleas.

Robert and Genet had four sons:

1. Lucas (1530–1593), Chief Baron of the Irish Exchequer
2. Roger, married Margaret, daughter of Richard Misset of Ballydromny, County Cavan
3. Thomas
4. John

—and three daughters:

1. Jeane, married Sir Thomas Dillon of Drumrany
2. Elizabeth, married Henry Plunket, merchant and alderman of Dublin
3. Alison, married Baron Slane

Dillon's son Lucas would become the father of James Dillon, 1st Earl of Roscommon.

== Career ==
Dillon followed his father and brother into the legal profession and became Attorney General for Ireland in 1534. In 1536-7 he accompanied Patrick Barnewall, the Solicitor General for Ireland, on a crucial diplomatic mission to England. One purpose of the mission was to prevent the Dissolution of the Monasteries from being extended to Ireland. They were successful in the short run, but Dillon, like Barnewall, quickly dropped his opposition to the suppression and was duly rewarded with his share in the spoils. In 1638 Dillon received St. Peter's Priory at Newtown, near Trim, County Meath. The former priory became the seat of his branch of the family, which was henceforth called the Dillons of Newtown. in 1646 he received the former Carmelite Abbey at Athnecarne (also called Ardnacrany) in County Westmeath, and the monastery of Kilkenny West. He served as seneschal of Kilkenny and Governor of Athlone. Like Barnewall he played an active part in establishing the King's Inn, Ireland's first law school, and was one of the original lessees, who held the Inn from the Crown.

In 1555 he was made a justice of the Court of King's Bench (Ireland) and on 3 September 1558 was promoted Chief Justice of the Common Pleas (also called of the Common Bench). His promotion was described as being a reward for his discretion and learning. He had then the reputation of being an efficient administrator. He was, however, at least sixty when he became Chief Justice; Elrington Ball thought that he was probably nearer seventy. In 1567 he was knighted. By 1575 complaints about his age and incapacity had reached the point where Elizabeth I was actively seeking a suitable replacement for him. Sir Henry Sidney, the Lord Deputy of Ireland, described Dillon as "much spent in years, decayed in both sense and body". He was accused of neglecting his official responsibilities; he rarely attended meetings of the Privy Council of Ireland, while he neglected his judicial duties entirely, and had effectively deputised his role as chief justice to the second justice. Sidney's ally Sir William Gerard, the Lord Chancellor of Ireland, referred to Dillon as a "scarecrow", and lobbied strongly for his removal from office. It seems however that no suitable replacement could be found as Dillon remained in office until his death in 1579, when, by Ball's reckoning, he may have been ninety years old.

== Death and timeline ==
In a letter of the 5 July 1579 Gerard reported Dillon's death to Francis Walsingham. Dillon therefore probably died shortly before the 5 July 1579. Older sources give his year of death as 1580.

Timeline
As his birth date is uncertain, so are all his ages.
Age	Date	Event
0	1490, estimate	Born
42–43	1533	Eldest brother died
43–44	1534	Attorney General for Ireland
47–48	1638	Received St. Peter's Priory at Newtown, near Trim, County Meath.
56–57	1547, 28 Jan	Accession of Edward VI, succeeding Henry VIII
62–63	1553, 6 Jul	Accession of Queen Mary I, succeeding Edward VI
64–65	1555	Justice of the Court of King's Bench (Ireland)
64–65	1558, 3 Sep	Promoted Chief Justice of the Irish Common Pleas
67–68	1558, 17 Nov	Accession of Queen Elizabeth I, succeeding Queen Mary I
74–75	1565, 13 Oct	Henry Sidney, appointed Lord Deputy of Ireland
85–86	1567, Dec	Knighted
88–89	1579	Died

== Notes and references ==
=== Sources ===
- Ball, Francis Elrington (1926). The Judges in Ireland 1221–1921. Vol. I (1st ed.). London: John Murray. OCLC 832154869. – 1221 to 1690
- Burke, Bernard (1866). A Genealogical History of the Dormant, Abeyant, Forfeited and Extinct Peerages of the British Empire (New ed.). London: Harrison. OCLC 11501348.
- Cokayne, George Edward (1895). Complete Peerage of England, Scotland, Ireland, Great Britain and the United Kingdom, Extant, Extinct, or Dormant. Vol. VI (1st ed.). London: George Bell and Sons. OCLC 1180818801. – N to R (for Roscommon)
- Crawford, Jon G. (2004). "Dillon, Robert (d. 1579?)". In Matthew, Colin; Harrison, Brian (eds.). Oxford Dictionary of National Biography. Vol. 16. New York: Oxford University Press. pp. 222–223. ISBN 0-19-861366-0.
- Crawford, Jon G. (2005). A Star Chamber Court in Ireland: The Court of Castle Chamber, 1571–1641. Dublin: Four Courts Press. ISBN 978-1-85182-934-7.
- Fryde, Edmund Boleslaw; Greenway, D. E.; Porter, S.; Roy, I., eds. (1986). Handbook of British Chronology. Royal Historical Society Guides and Handbooks, No. 2 (3rd ed.). London: Offices of the Royal Historical Society. ISBN 0-86193-106-8. – (for timeline)
- Hart, A. R. (2000). History of the King's Serjeants at Law in Ireland. Dublin: Four Courts Press. ISBN 978-1-85182-528-8. – (Snippet view)
- Kenny, Colum (1992). The King's Inns and the Kingdom of Ireland. Dublin: Irish Academic Press. ISBN 978-0-7165-2472-4. – (Snippet view)
- Lodge, John (1789). Archdall, Mervyn (ed.). The Peerage of Ireland or, A Genealogical History of the Present Nobility of that Kingdom. Vol. IV. Dublin: James Moore. OCLC 264906028. – Viscounts
- McCormack, Anthony; Clavin, Terry (October 2009). McGuire, James; Quinn, James (eds.). "Dillon, Sir Robert". Dictionary of Irish Biography.
- Pollard, Albert Frederick (1901). "Dillon, Sir Robert (1500?–1580)". In Lee, Sidney (ed.). Dictionary of National Biography Supplement. Vol. II. New York: MacMillan and Co. p. 135. OCLC 9146854.
- Shaw, William A. (1906). The Knights of England. Vol. II. London: Sherratt & Hughes. – Knights bachelors & Index

Legal offices
Preceded by Thomas St. Lawrence	Attorney-General for Ireland; 1535–1554	Succeeded by Barnaby Skurloke or Skurlog
Preceded by John Bathe	Chief Justice of the Irish Common Pleas; 1558–1579	Succeeded by Nicholas Nugent
