= Lucas Dillon (judge) =

Irish judge (died 1593)

Chief Baron of the Irish Exchequer
- In office 1570–1593
- Preceded by: James Bathe
- Succeeded by: Sir Robert Napier

Personal details
- Born: 1529 or 1530 Newtown near Trim
- Died: 17 February 1593 Dublin
- Education: Middle Temple, London

Sir Lucas Dillon (died 1593), also called Luke, was a leading Irish barrister and judge of the Elizabethan era who held the offices of Attorney General for Ireland and Chief Baron of the Irish Exchequer. He supported the Lord Deputy Henry Sidney in the cess controversy and the Lord Deputy John Perrot in the Desmond Rebellions. He was held in high regard by Queen Elizabeth I, but was accused by his enemies of corruption and maladministration.

== Birth and origins ==
Family tree

Lucas Dillon with his two wives, his parents, and other selected relatives. (Note: This family tree is based on the genealogies of the earls of Roscommon. Also see the lists of siblings and children in the text.)

James; Dillon of Riverston	Elizabeth; Bathe
Bartholomew; Dillon of Riverston d. 1533	James; Bathe c. 1500 – 1570; Chief Baron	Robert; Dillon of Newtown d. 1579; Chief Justice	Elizabeth; Barnewall
Thomas; Dillon of Riverston	Jane; Bathe	Lucas; Dillon c. 1530 – 1593; Chief Baron	Marion; Sharl d. 1607	Christopher; Barnewall; 1522–1575
Robert; Dillon c. 1540 – 1597	James; 1st Earl; Roscommon d. 1641	Eleanor; Barnewall d. 1628
Robert; 2nd Earl d. 1642	Margaret; Barry

Legend

XXX	Subject of the article	XXX	Earls of Roscommon

Lucas was born in 1529 or 1530, (Note: He died on 17 February 1593 at the age of 64.) the eldest son of Sir Robert Dillon and his wife Genet (also called Elizabeth) Barnewall. His father, called of Newtown, pursued a judicial career and would in 1558 become Chief Justice of the Irish Common Pleas. His father's family was Old English and descended from Sir Henry Dillon who had come to Ireland with Prince John in 1185 during the Anglo-Norman invasion of Ireland.

Lucas's mother was a younger daughter of Edward Barnewall of Crickstown. Her family also was Old English and descended from Michael de Berneval who had come to Ireland in the time of Henry II of England (12th century).

He had three brothers and three sisters (see his father's article).

== Early life ==
He entered the Middle Temple, London, in 1561, was called to the Bar, and then returned to Ireland to practice law. His rise in the legal profession was rapid: he became Principal Solicitor for Ireland in 1565. He bought an estate at Moymet, near Trim, County Meath, on which he built Moymet House, where he lived in 1565, now a ruin. Moymet is near the older family estate of Newtown Abbey that had been given to his father. Dillon later also acquired lands in County Cavan. He also owned a townhouse on Nicholas Street in Dublin.

== First marriage and children ==
Dillon married about 1565 Jane Bathe, daughter of James Bathe by his second wife Elizabeth Burnell. His father in law was Chief Baron of the Irish Exchequer.

Lucas and Jane had seven sons:

1. James (c. 1570 – 1641), became the 1st Earl of Roscommon in 1622
2. Henry (died 1609) of Kentstown in County Meath
3. Christopher
4. Oliver
5. Alexander
6. John, either died childless or married a daughter of Sir William Sarsfield of Lucan
7. Robert

—and five daughters:

1. Genet, married Christopher Plunkett, 9th Baron Killeeen and was mother of Luke Plunket, 1st Earl of Fingall.
2. Eleanor (died 1607), married Robert Rochfort of Kilbride, ancestor of the prominent Rochfort family
3. Elizabeth
4. Margaret, married John Sarsfield of Shurninges
5. Anne, married Richard Plunket of Rathmore

== Further career ==
He was promoted Attorney General for Ireland on 8 November 1566.

=== Member of Parliament ===
He sat in the Irish House of Commons as one of the two knights of the shire for County Meath in Elizabeth's 2nd Irish Parliament (1569–1571).

=== Elevation to the Bench ===
In 1570 he succeeded his father-in-law James Bathe as chief baron of the Irish exchequer, rather against the wishes of the Irish legal profession, most of whom would have preferred the second Baron of the Exchequer, Robert Cusack. The final decision rested with Queen Elizabeth, who wrote that while she heard very good reports of Cusack, Dillon had the stronger claim (the precise reason for the Queen's preference remains obscure, but her judgment in such matters was usually sound). Cusack's supporters praised him as "a true Protestant", whereas Dillon was known to incline privately to the Roman Catholic faith, and in his last years made little effort to conceal the fact. However, the English Crown, while it made intermittent efforts to appoint judges with strongly Protestant views, would as a rule accept outward adherence to the Church of Ireland as sufficient evidence of loyalty, and Dillon's private religious opinions, which were shared by several of his colleagues, were thus not a bar to advancement. In any event, Cusack died later the same year.

=== Judge ===
Until his last years, Dillon was held in high regard by the English Crown. Sir William Gerard, the Lord Chancellor of Ireland, described him as an energetic reformer, who was diligent in attending the Privy Council and the Court of Castle Chamber (the Irish equivalent of the English Star Chamber). He was seen as one of the few Irish judges of real eminence, at a time when the Crown authorities ranked the competences of most of his colleagues below that of an inexperienced junior member of the English Bar.

=== Sidney ===
Dillon was particularly close to Sir Henry Sidney, the Lord Deputy of Ireland, who called him "my faithful Dillon". Sidney knighted him in 1575.

He was one of Sidney's few influential supporters during the so-called "cess controversy", the much-resented attempt to impose a tax for the upkeep of military garrisons on the gentry of the Pale, and became rather unpopular as a result. His membership of a five-man commission empowered to fine those landowners who refused to pay the cess was a particular source of irritation, especially as he was its only Irish member.

Like Gerard, Dillon was a firm believer in the benefits of extending the common law to all parts of Ireland, and of encouraging the settlement of all grievances by resort to law. In general, he favoured moderation rather than coercion, although he would where required by the Crown carry out repressive measures. He played a considerable part in putting down the Desmond Rebellions and the rebellion of William Nugent. Sidney did, however, express concerns about Dillon's increasing ill-health, which he feared might make him incapable of performing his duties as a judge. In September 1578 the Queen recalled Sidney and he was replaced by William Drury, as only Lord Justice of Ireland.

== Second marriage ==
Dillon married secondly in 1575 Marion Sherle (or Shurle), daughter of Patrick Sherle of Shallon, County Meath, and widow of Sir Christopher Barnewall of Turvey House. The marriage stayed childless, but Marion had many daughters from her first marriage; one of them, Eleanor (or Helen), married her stepfather's eldest son, James Dillon. Marion would die as his widow in 1607 but be buried beside her first husband in Lusk church.

== Later years ==
Dillon inherited the family's lands at Newtown on his father's death in 1579. Older sources give his father's year of death as 1580.

=== Execution of Nicholas Nugent ===
Lucas's reputation suffered greatly through his sitting, together with his cousin Robert Dillon, as a judge in the trial of Nicholas Nugent for treason in 1582. Nicholas was accused of treason in the context of the rebellion of his nephew William Nugent. There had been a long and bitter feud between the Nugent and Dillon families. Nicholas had recently been appointed Chief Justice of the Common Pleas and Lucas's cousin Robert Dillon reportedly hoped to take Nugent's place. The trial of a senior judge on a treason charge was without precedent in England or Ireland. Both Dillons should have been disqualified from sitting as judges at his trial as one of the charges was that Nugent had plotted to kill them. The trial ended with Nugent's conviction and execution (on 6 April 1582), which caused grave public disquiet, (although he did at least have the benefit of trial by jury), and led to a claim that Irish-born judges were incapable of administering impartial justice. The Queen for a time altered her favourable opinion of Lucas, but after obtaining a series of private audiences with her during a lengthy visit to London in 1582 and 1583 he was restored to favour. He was apparently offered the vacant position of Lord Chief Justice of Ireland, but declined it.

=== Perrot ===
Dillon was by now acquiring powerful enemies, notably Thomas Butler, 10th Earl of Ormond, but he also had friends, including the new Lord Deputy, Sir John Perrot, appointed 1584. He was spoken of as a likely Lord Chancellor of Ireland, although his critics said that he was too corrupt for the post. Queen Elizabeth thought highly of him, apart from a period of coolness in their relationship after the death of Nicholas Nugent, and at one point was said to have offered him the office of Lord Chief Justice of Ireland (i.e. Chief Justice of the Queen's Bench). If the offer was made, it seems that his enemies had enough influence to block it. As some consolation for his failure to attain higher office, he was in 1583 made Seneschal of the barony of Kilkenny West.

As Perrot's Deputyship became increasingly embattled, Dillon, his ally, was also attacked: Adam Loftus, Archbishop of Dublin accused him of recusancy, a very serious charge to make against a servant of the Crown, and informed the London government that he was "very corrupt". The charge of recusancy at least had a grain of truth, since Lucas was widely known to favour the old religion. William Nugent, who had received a royal pardon for his rebellion against the Crown, made a concerted attack on Sir Robert Dillon, who was by now Lord Chief Justice, and for a time had him suspended from office. Lucas was also attacked by Nugent, although he was not charged with any crime, even after Perrot's final downfall in 1593, not long before his own death. The stress of defending himself against charges of corruption is said to have hastened his end, although he was, in any case, an old man by the standards of the time, and had been in ill health for some years.

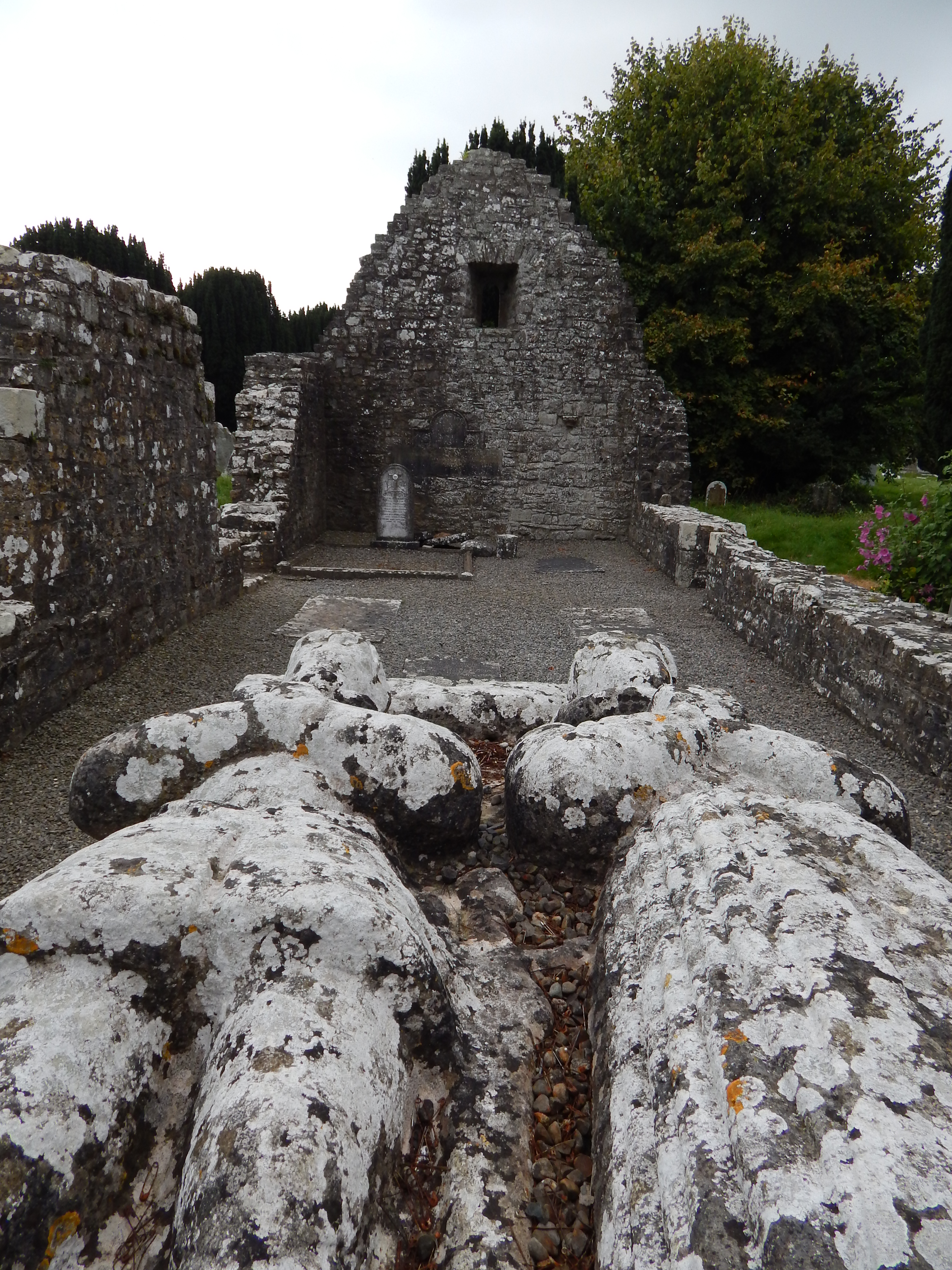
Effigies of Sir Lucas Dillon and his 1st wife, Jane Bathe, Newtown Abbey

== Death, tomb, and timeline ==
Dillon died on 17 February 1593 in Dublin, (Note: Some authors give 1592, probably because they did not know the month of the unadjusted OS format.) He was succeeded on 10 April in his office as chief baron of the exchequer by Sir Robert Napier.

He was buried beside his first wife, Jane Bathe, in the Clonburn parish church, the ruin of which still stands next to Newtown Abbey, near Trim, County Meath. Their monument is an altar tomb. Its chest is crowned by the couple's recumbent effigies in high relief. The tomb is nicknamed "the tomb of the jealous man and woman", perhaps because the effigies are separated by a sword of state.

A Latin inscription, not visible any more on the tomb, gave the 17 February as the date of death and his age as 64.

Timeline
As his birth date is uncertain, so are all his ages.
Age	Date	Event
0	1529, estimate	Born
17–18	1547, 28 Jan	Accession of Edward VI, succeeding Henry VIII
23–24	1553, 6 Jul	Accession of Mary I, succeeding Edward VI
28–29	1558, 3 Sep	Father appointed Chief Justice of the Irish Common Pleas.
28–29	1558, 17 Nov	Accession of Elizabeth I, succeeding Mary I
35–36	1565, 13 Oct	Henry Sidney, appointed Lord Deputy of Ireland
40–41	1570	Chief Baron of the Irish Exchequer.
45–46	1575, Sep	Knighted in Drogheda by Sir Henry Sidney
45–46	1575	Married his 2nd wife
49–50	1579	Inherited Newtown from his father.
50–51	1580, 15 Jul	Arthur Grey, 14th Baron Grey de Wilton, appointed Lord Deputy of Ireland
51–52	1581	Helped putting down the rebellion of William Nugent
52–53	1582, Apr	Condemned Nicholas Nugent for treason.
54–55	1584, 7 Jan	John Perrot, appointed Lord Deputy of Ireland
63–64	1593, 17 Feb	Died in Dublin

== Reputation ==
Lucas Dillon's record as a judge and as a statesman has received a somewhat mixed verdict from historians. F. Elrington Ball points to the charges of corruption made against him and his improper conduct of the Nugent trial. Crawford, on the other hand, praises his talent and energy, points to the high regard most Crown officials had for him, and argues that the charges of corruption made against him were partisan in nature. It is significant that Queen Elizabeth, who was noted for her skill in choosing good public servants, thought highly of him.

== Notes and references ==
=== Sources ===
- Bagwell, Richard (1885). Ireland under the Tudors. Vol. II. London: Longmans, Green, and Co. OCLC 761857292. – 1558 to 1578
- Ball, Francis Elrington (1926). The Judges in Ireland 1221–1921. Vol. I (1st ed.). London: John Murray. OCLC 832154869. – 1221 to 1690
- Brewer, James Norris (1826). The Beauties of Ireland. Vol. II. London: Sherwood, Gilbert, & Piper. OCLC 4286306. – Leinster (continued: Carlow, Kildare, Queen's County, King's County, Meath, Westmeath, Longford, Louth) & Munster
- Brewer, James Norris (1829). A History of Leinster: Embracing the beauties of Dublin, Wicklow, Wexford, Kilkenny &c. &c. London: J. S. Taylor & Co. OCLC 875191110.
- Clavin, Terry (October 2009). McGuire, James; Quinn, James (eds.). "Dillon, Lucas (Luke)". Dictionary of Irish Biography. – (the subject)
- Cokayne, George Edward (1895). Complete Peerage of England, Scotland, Ireland, Great Britain and the United Kingdom, Extant, Extinct, or Dormant. Vol. VI (1st ed.). London: George Bell and Sons. OCLC 1180818801. – N to R (for Roscommon)
- Crawford, Jon G. (2004). "Dillon, Sir Lucas (d. 1592)". In Matthew, Colin; Harrison, Brian (eds.). Oxford Dictionary of National Biography. Vol. 16. New York: Oxford University Press. pp. 219–220. ISBN 0-19-861366-0.
- Crawford, Jon G. (2005). A Star Chamber Court in Ireland: The Court of Castle Chamber, 1571–1641. Dublin: Four Courts Press. ISBN 978-1-85182-934-7.
- Fryde, Edmund Boleslaw; Greenway, D. E.; Porter, S.; Roy, I., eds. (1986). Handbook of British Chronology. Royal Historical Society Guides and Handbooks, No. 2 (3rd ed.). London: Offices of the Royal Historical Society. ISBN 0-86193-106-8. – (for timeline)
- Gerrard, David (2004). The hidden Places of Ireland. Aldermaston, Berkshire: Travel Publishing Limited. ISBN 1-904-434-10-X. – (Preview)
- Hoare, Richard Colt (1807). Journal of a Tour in Ireland A.D. 1806. London: W. Miller. OCLC 00802130.
- Jocelyn, James (1973). "The Renaissance Tombs at Lusk and Newtown Trim". The Journal of the Royal Society of Antiquaries of Ireland. 103: 153–166. JSTOR 25508621.
- Lodge, John (1789). Archdall, Mervyn (ed.). The Peerage of Ireland or, A Genealogical History of the Present Nobility of that Kingdom. Vol. IV. Dublin: James Moore. OCLC 264906028. – Viscounts (for Dillon)
- McCormack, Anthony; Clavin, Terry (October 2009). McGuire, James; Quinn, James (eds.). "Dillon, Sir Robert". Dictionary of Irish Biography. – (the subject's father)
- Moody, Theodore William; Martin, F. X.; Byrne, Francis John, eds. (1984). A New History of Ireland. Vol. IX: Maps, Genealogies, Lists. Oxford: Oxford University Press. ISBN 0-19-821745-5.
- Pollard, Albert Frederick (1901). "Dillon, Sir Lucas (d. 1593)". In Lee, Sidney (ed.). Dictionary of National Biography Supplement. Vol. II. New York: MacMillan and Co. pp. 132–133. OCLC 9146854.
- Pollard, Albert Frederick (1894). "Napier, Robert (d. 1615), judge". In Lee, Sidney (ed.). Dictionary of National Biography. Vol. XL. New York: MacMillan and Co. p. 73. OCLC 8544105.
- Shaw, William A. (1906). The Knights of England. Vol. II. London: Sherratt & Hughes. – Knights bachelors & Index
- Smyth, Constantine (1839). Chronicle of the Law Officers of Ireland. London: Henry Butterworth. OCLC 1018312937.
- Webb, Alfred (1878). "Dillon, Sir Henry". Compendium of Irish Biography. Dublin: M. H. Gill & Son. p. 149. OCLC 122693688.

Legal offices
Preceded by James Barnewall	Attorney-General for Ireland; 1566-1570	Succeeded by Edward Fitz-Symon
Preceded by James Bathe	Chief Baron of the Irish Exchequer; 1570–1593	Succeeded by Robert Napier
