= Bartholomew Dillon =

Irish judge (died 1533)

Lord Chief Justice of Ireland
- In office 15 January 1533 – 1533
- Preceded by: Patrick Bermingham
- Succeeded by: Patrick Finglas

Personal details
- Born: Riverston, County Meath
- Died: 1533

Sir Bartholomew Dillon (died 1533) was a leading Irish judge of the sixteenth century who held the offices of Chief Baron of the Irish Exchequer and Lord Justice of Ireland.

== Birth and origins ==
Bartholomew was born at Riverston, County Meath, eldest son of Sir James Dillon and his wife Elizabeth Bathe. His father was a Baron of the Exchequer. His father's family was Old English and descended from Sir Henry Dillon who came to Ireland with Prince John in 1185. His mother was a daughter of Bartholomew Bathe of Dollardstown Castle, Athy, County Kildare.

He leads the list of his brothers below as the eldest:

1. Bartholomew (died 1533)
2. Gerald
3. Robert (died 1579), became Chief Justice of the Irish Common Pleas
4. Thomas, prior of St Peter of Trim
5. Edmund, prior of St. John's Priory, Trim, and prior of Lusk

He had two sisters:

1. Elizabeth, married a Cusack of Portrane
2. Thomasine, married John Delafield

Family tree

Bartholomew Dillon with his two wives, his parents, and other selected relatives. (Note: This family tree is based on the genealogies of the earls of Roscommon. Also see the lists of siblings and children in the text.)

Sir Richard; Dillon of Proudston fl. 1424	Jeanne; Wile
James; Dillon of Riverston	Elizabeth; Bathe
Elizabeth; Barnewall	Bartholomew; Dillon of Riverston d. 1533; Chief Justice	Elinor; Plunkett	Robert; Dillon of Newtown d. 1579; Chief Justice
Thomas; Dillon of Riverston	Anne; Luttrell	Lucas; Dillon; 1530–1592; Chief Baron
Robert; Dillon c. 1540 – 1597; Chief Justice	Catharine; Sarsfield d. 1615	James; 1st Earl; Roscommon d. 1641

Legend

XXX	Subject of the article	XXX	Earls of Roscommon

== Marriages and children ==
Dillon married twice. His first wife was Elizabeth Barnewall, only daughter of Thomas Barnewall of Irishtown, who was the second son of Robert Barnewall, 1st Baron Trimleston.

Bartholomew and Elizabeth had a son:

1. Thomas (living in 1541), married Anne, daughter of Sir Thomas Luttrell, and was father of Sir Robert Dillon

—and two daughters:

1. Anne, married Nicholas Kent of Davidstown
2. Ismay, married three times. First to John Fleming of Stephenstown, a grandson of James Fleming, 7th Baron Slane, and was the mother of Thomas Fleming, 10th Baron Slane. Secondly to Richard Tath of Cookstown, and thirdly to Sir Thomas Barnewall, second son of John Barnewall, 3rd Baron Trimlestown and his eldest child by his second wife Margaret FitzLeones.

Dillon's younger brother Robert founded the branch of the family that would later hold the title Earl of Roscommon. By birth and marriage the Dillon brothers belonged to the small Anglo-Irish ruling class of the Pale.

== Career ==
Dillon was an official at the Court of Exchequer (Ireland) by 1505 and became a Baron of the Exchequer in 1507. He was promoted Chief Baron in 1514 but removed after a year, for reasons unknown. He was Deputy Treasurer of Ireland from 1516 to 1522, when he became a judge of the Court of King's Bench (Ireland). On 15 January 1533 he was made Lord Chief Justice of the King's Bench for Ireland but died suddenly soon after.

According to Elrington Ball, at a time when the Irish ruling class were deeply split between supporters (the so-called Geraldines) and opponents of the 9th Earl of Kildare, Dillon was one of the most committed Geraldines, and spent much of his time in England defending the Earl of Kildare's interests.

== Notes and references ==
=== Sources ===
- Ball, Francis Elrington (1926). The Judges in Ireland 1221–1921. Vol. I (1st ed.). London: John Murray. OCLC 832154869. – 1221 to 1690
- Cokayne, George Edward (1896). Complete Peerage of England, Scotland, Ireland, Great Britain and the United Kingdom, Extant, Extinct, or Dormant. Vol. VII (1st ed.). London: George Bell and Sons. OCLC 1180891114. – S to T (for Slane)
- Conwell, Eugene Alfred (1873). "A Ramble Round Trim". The Journal of the Royal Historical and Archaeological Association of Ireland. 4th. 2 (2): 361–430.
- Lodge, John (1789). Archdall, Mervyn (ed.). The Peerage of Ireland or, A Genealogical History of the Present Nobility of that Kingdom. Vol. IV. Dublin: James Moore. OCLC 264906028. – Viscounts
- Smyth, Constantine (1839). Chronicle of the Law Officers of Ireland. London: Henry Butterworth. OCLC 1018312937.
- Webb, Alfred (1878). "Dillon, Sir Henry". Compendium of Irish Biography. Dublin: M. H. Gill & Son. p. 149. OCLC 122693688.

Legal offices
Preceded by Patrick Bermingham	Chief Justice of Ireland (Chief Justice of the King's Bench); 1533	Succeeded by Patrick Finglas
