= Christopher Nugent =

Irish nobleman and writer

Sir Christopher Nugent, 6th (or 14th) Baron Delvin (1544–1602) was an Irish nobleman and writer. He was arrested on suspicion of treason against Queen Elizabeth I of England, and died while in confinement before his trial had taken place.

== Family and early years ==
He was the eldest son of Richard, 5th (or 13th) Baron Delvin, and Elizabeth, daughter of Jenico Preston, 3rd Viscount Gormanston, and widow of Thomas Nangle, styled Baron of Navan. Richard Nugent, fourth or twelfth Baron Delvin, was his great-grandfather. He succeeded to the title on the death of his father, on 10 December 1559, and during his minority was the ward of Thomas Ratcliffe, third earl of Sussex, for whom he conceived a great friendship.

He was matriculated a fellow commoner of Clare Hall, Cambridge, on 12 May 1563, and was presented to the queen when she visited the university in 1564; on coming of age, about November 1565, he repaired to Ireland, with letters of commendation from the queen to the lord deputy, Sir Henry Sidney, granting him the lease in reversion of the abbey of All Saints and the custody of Sleaught-William in the Annaly, County Longford.

As an undertaker in the plantation of County Laois and County Offaly, he had previously obtained, on 3 February 1563–64, a grant of the castle and lands of Corbetstown, alias Ballycorbet, in Offaly (then known as King's County): land confiscated from Garret FitzGerald. In the autumn of the following year, he distinguished himself against Shane O'Neill, and was knighted at Drogheda by Sidney. On 30 June 1567 he obtained a lease of the abbey of Inchmore in the Annaly and the abbey of Fore in County Westmeath, to which was added on 7 October the lease of other lands in the same county.

== Suspicions of disloyalty and treason ==
In July 1574 his refusal, with his cousin Christopher, Viscount Gormanston, to sign the proclamation of rebellion against the Earl of Desmond laid his loyalty open to suspicion, given the tone of the recent papal bull Regnans in Excelsis. He grounded his refusal on the fact that he was not a privy councillor, and had not been made acquainted with the reasons for the proclamation. The English Privy Council, thinking that his objections savoured more of 'a wilful partiality to an offender against her majesty than a willing readiness to her service', sent peremptory orders for his submission. Fresh letters of explanation were proffered by him and Gormanston in February 1575, but, being deemed insufficient, the two noblemen were in May placed under restraint. They thereupon confessed their 'fault', and Delvin shortly afterwards appears to have recovered the good opinion of government: for on 15 December the Lord-Deputy Sir Henry Sidney wrote that he expected a speedy reformation of the country, 'a great deal the rather through the good hope I conceive of the service of my lord of Delvin, whom I find active and of good discretion'; and in April 1576 Delvin entertained Sidney while on progress.

Before the end of the year, however, there sprang up a controversy between the government and the gentry of the Pale in regard to cess, in which Delvin played a principal part. It had long been the custom of the Anglo-Irish government to support the army, to take up provisions, etc., at a fixed price. This custom, called "cess", was considered unfair by the inhabitants of the Pale. In 1576, at the instigation chiefly of Delvin, they denounced the custom as unconstitutional, and appointed three of their number, all leading barristers, to lay their grievances before the queen. The deputation met with scant courtesy in England. Elizabeth I was indignant at having her royal prerogative called in question, and, after roundly abusing the deputies for their impertinence, sent them to the Fleet Prison. In Ireland Delvin, Baltinglas, and others were confined in Dublin Castle in May 1577. After some weeks' detention, the deputies and their principals were released after expressing contrition for their conduct. But with Delvin, 'for that he has showed himself to be the chiefest instrument in terrifying and dissuading the rest of the associates from yielding their submission', Elizabeth left it to Sidney's discretion whether he should remain in prison for some time longer. Finally, an arrangement was arrived at between the government and the gentry of the Pale.

In the autumn of 1579, Delvin was entrusted with the command of the forces of the Pale, and was reported to have done good service in defending the northern marches against Turlough Luineach O'Neill. His 'obstinate affection to popery', however, told in his disfavour, and it was as much for this general reason as for any proof of treason that the Anglo-Irish government, in December 1580, committed him, along with his father-in-law, Gerald FitzGerald, 11th Earl of Kildare, to Dublin Castle on suspicion of being implicated in the rebellious projects of Viscount Baltinglas. The higher officials, including Lord-Deputy Grey de Wilton, were convinced of his treason, but they were unable to establish their charge against him. After an imprisonment of 18 months, he and FitzGerald were sent to England in the custody of Marshal Henry Bagenal.

In Dublin, the Nugent family's enemies, notably the Dillons, moved against his relatives. His uncle Nicholas Nugent, the Chief Justice of the Irish Common Pleas, was suspended from office, tried for treason and hanged. Delvin's younger brother William Nugent was driven into rebellion but eventually obtained a pardon.

On 22 June 1582, Delvin was examined by Sir Walter Mildmay and Gerard, Master of the Rolls. No fresh evidence of his treason was adduced, and Henry Wallop heard with alarm that it was intended to set him at liberty.

In April 1585 he was again in Ireland, sitting as a peer in parliament. During the course of the year, he was again in England; but after the death, on 16 November 1585, of the Earl of Kildare he was allowed to return to Ireland, 'in the company of the new Earl of Kildare, partly for the execution of the will of the earl, his father-in-law, partly to look into the estates of his own lands, from whence he hath been so long absent'. He carried letters of commendation to the new lord deputy, Sir John Perrot; and the queen, 'the better to express her favour towards him,' granted him a renewal of the leases he held from the crown.

He was under obligations to return to England as soon as he had transacted his business. But during his absence many lawsuits pertaining to his lands had arisen, and, owing to the hostility of Sir Robert Dillon, Chief Justice of the Irish Common Pleas, and Chief Baron Sir Lucas Dillon, his hereditary enemies, he found it difficult to put the law in motion.

He seems to have returned to England in 1587, and, having succeeded in securing the favour of Elizabeth's spymaster William Cecil, 1st Baron Burghley, he was allowed in October 1588 to return to Ireland.

New Lord Deputy Sir William Fitzwilliam wrote to Burghley that he hoped that Delvin would "throughly performe that honorable and good opynion it hath pleased yr Lp. to conceave of him, wch no doubt he may very sufficiently do, and wth all do her matie great service in action, both cyvill and martiall, if to the witt wherewth God hath indued him and the loue and liking wherewth the countrey doth affect him, he applie him self wth his best endevor." He included Delvin in his list of 'doubtful men in Ireland.'

One cause that told greatly in his disfavour was his extreme animosity to Robert Dillon, who he regarded as having done to death his uncle Nicholas Nugent. To Burghley, who warned him that he was regarded with suspicion, he protested his loyalty and readiness to quit all that was dear to him in Ireland and live in poverty in England, rather than that the queen should conceive the least thought of undutifulness in him. He led, he declared, an orderly life, avoiding discontented society, every term following the law in Dublin for the recovery of his lands, and serving the queen at the assizes in his own neighbourhood. The rest of his time he spent in books and building.

The violence with which he prosecuted Chief Justice Dillon afforded ground to his enemies to describe him as a discontented and seditious person, especially when, after the acquittal of Dillon, he charged the Lord Deputy with having acted with undue partiality.

However, in 1593 he was appointed leader of the forces of Westmeath at the general hosting on the hill of Tara, and during the disturbed period (1593–7) that preceded the rebellion of Hugh O'Neill, Earl of Tyrone, he displayed great activity in his defence of the Pale. He was commended for his zeal by Sir John Norris.

He obtained permission to visit England in 1597, and in consequence of his recent chargeable and valourous services, he was, on 7 May, ordered a grant of so much of the O'Farrells' and O'Reillys' lands as amounted to an annual rent to the crown of 100/, though the warrant was never executed during his lifetime.

On 20 May he was appointed a commissioner to inquire into abuses in the government of Ireland. On 17 March 1598, a commission (renewed on 3 July and 30 October) was issued to him and Edward Nugent of the Dísert to deliver the jail of Mullingar (clear out the prisoners) by martial law, for "that the gaol is now very much pestered with a great number of prisoners, the most part whereof are poor men ... and that there can be no sessions held whereby the prisoners might receive their trial by ordinary course of law". On 7 August 1599 he was granted the wardship of his grandson, Christopher Chevers, with a condition that he should cause his ward 'to be maintained and educated in the English religion, and in English apparel, in the college of the Holy Trinity, Dublin'; in November he was commissioned by the Earl of Ormonde to hold a parley with the Earl of Tyrone.

On the outbreak of Tyrone's rebellion, the extreme severity with which his country was treated by Tyrone on his march into Munster early in 1600 induced Delvin to submit to him; and, though he does not appear to have rendered him any active service, he was shortly afterwards arrested on suspicion of treason by the current Lord Deputy, Mountjoy, and imprisoned again in Dublin Castle. He died in the castle before his trial, apparently on 17 August 1602, though by another account on 5 September or 1 October, and was buried at Castle Delvin on 5 October.

== Marriage and issue ==
Delvin married Lady Mary FitzGerald, daughter of Gerald FitzGerald, 11th Earl of Kildare, and Mabel Browne; she died on 1 October 1610. His and Mary's children were:

- Richard Nugent, 1st Earl of Westmeath (1583–1642)
- Christopher of Corbetstown, who married Anne, daughter of Edward Cusack of Lismullen, and widow of Sir Ambrose Forth, judge of the Irish Court of Admiralty; he was dead by 1637, when Anne was described as the wife of Valerian Wellesley
- Gerald
- Thomas
- Gilbert
- William
- Mabel, who married, first, Murrough O'Brien, 4th Baron Inchiquin, then John Fitzpatrick, second son of Florence Fitzpatrick, Baron Upper Ossory
- Elizabeth, who married Gerald FitzGerald, 14th Earl of Kildare
- Mary, first wife of Anthony (or Owny) O'Dempsey, heir-apparent to Terence O'Dempsey, 1st Viscount Clanmalier
- Eleanor, wife of Christopher Chevers of Macetown, County Meath
- Margaret, who married a Fitzgerald
- Juliana, second wife of Sir Gerald Aylmer, 1st Baronet, of Donade, County Kildare.

== Works ==
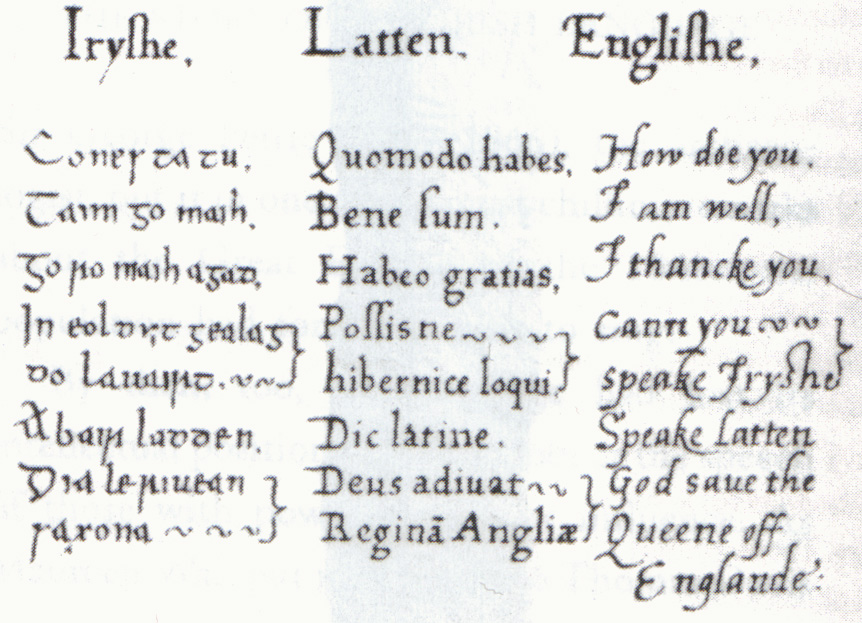
Irish-Latin-English phrase book compiled by Sir Christopher Nugent for Elizabeth I of England.

Delvin was the author of:

1. A Primer of the Irish Language, compiled at the request and for the use of Queen Elizabeth. It is described by John Thomas Gilbert as a 'small and elegantly written volume,' consisting of 'an address to the queen in English, an introductory statement in Latin, followed by the Irish alphabet, the vowels, consonants, and diphthongs, with words and phrases in Irish, Latin, and English.'

2. A Plot for the Reformation of Ireland, which, though short, is not without interest, as expressing the views of what may be described as the moderate or constitutional party in Ireland as distinct from officialdom on the one hand, and the Irish on the other. He writes that the viceroy's authority is too absolute; that the institution of presidents of provinces is unnecessary; that justice is not administered impartially; that the people are plundered by a beggarly soldiery, who find it in their interest to create dissensions; that the prince's word is pledged recklessly and broken shamelessly, and, above all, that there is no means of education such as is furnished by a university provided for the gentry, "in myne opynion one of the cheifest causes of mischeif in the realme."

== Sources ==
This incorporates the article by Robert Dunlop in the old DNB, who used the following sources:

- Lodge's Peerage, ed. Mervyn Archdall, i. 233–7;
- Charles Henry Cooper, Athenae Cantabr.. ii. 331–3, and authorities there quoted;
- Calendar of State Papers, Ireland, Eliz.;
- Cal. Carew MSS.;
- Morrin's Cal. Patent Rolls, Eliz.;
- Cal. Fiants, Eliz.;
- Annals of the Four Masters, ed. O'Donovan;
- Annals of Loch Cé, ed. Hennessy;
- Fynes Moryson, Itinerary;
- Stafford's Pacata Hibernia;
- Gilbert's Facsimiles of National MSS. of Ireland, iv. 1;
- Richard Bagwell, Ireland under the Tudors.

Also see:

- Hickey, Elizabeth (1978). The Green Cockatrice.
- Nugent, Brian (2008). Shakespeare was Irish!. Brian Nugent. ISBN 978-0-9556812-1-9.
- David Mathew, The Celtic peoples and renaissance Europe (London, 1933).
- Helen Coburn-Walsh The rebellion of William Nugent in R. V. Comerford (ed.) Religion, Conflict and co-existence in Ireland (Dublin, 1990).

== Notes ==
Attribution

This article incorporates text from a publication now in the public domain: Dunlop, Robert (1895). "Nugent, Christopher (1544–1602)". In Lee, Sidney (ed.). Dictionary of National Biography. Vol. 41. London: Smith, Elder & Co. pp. 256–259.

Peerage of Ireland
Preceded by Richard Nugent	Baron Delvin; 1559–1602	Succeeded by Richard Nugent
