= Robert Cusack (judge) =

Irish judge

Robert Cusack (c.1516–1570) was an Irish judge of the sixteenth century, who held office as a Baron of the Court of Exchequer (Ireland). He was strongly recommended for the position of Chief Baron of the Irish Exchequer, but was passed over for the office, though with a promise of future preferment. His career was cut short by his premature death.

He came from a prominent Anglo-Irish landowning family of the Pale. Although his legitimacy was questionable, as his father denied that he had been lawfully married to his mother, this did not harm his career.

== Family ==
He was born at Cussington (now Cushinstown), County Meath, the eldest son of Sir Thomas Cusack, later Lord Chancellor of Ireland, and his first wife and cousin Joan Hussey. His parents' marriage was unhappy and in 1537 it was annulled on the grounds of consanguinity; Robert's father always denied that there had been a valid marriage between himself and Joan, and spoke of his second wife Maud Darcy as his first "lawful" wife. On the other hand, Thomas acknowledged the paternity of Robert and his other children by Joan, and he seems to have treated them generously enough. In the 1550s Robert was living at Lismullen Abbey, which his father had acquired on the Dissolution of the Monasteries (ironically his sister was the last Abbess of Lismullen), and later he lived at the older family home at Cussington. The John Cusack who died in 1629 and was described as the owner of Cussington was probably Robert's son.

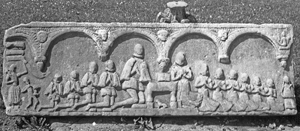
The Cusack family memorial at Trevet, County Meath, which was erected by Robert's father, Thomas Cusack

== Career ==
He was admitted to the Inner Temple in 1552-3 and later acted as Master of the Revels there. He was called to the Bar, and returned to Ireland to practice law. He became the second Baron of the Irish Exchequer in 1561, his fee being £30 per annum. In 1566 he was appointed one of three members of the Council for the Government of Munster, but was accused of showing too much favour to Gerald FitzGerald, 15th Earl of Desmond. He sat on several Royal Commissions in the 1560s, to survey lands, determine disputed land titles, and to negotiate with the O'Reilly clan. In 1567, along with all the other senior judges, he was named as one of the lessees of King's Inn. He was granted several wardships, including that of his niece Mary Wise.

=== His attempt to become Chief Baron ===
He was a staunch Protestant, at a time when many Irish judges, including (reputedly) his own father, while publicly adhering to the Church of Ireland, practised the Roman Catholic faith in private. His supporters called him, no doubt with some exaggeration, "the only Protestant on the Bench". On account of his zeal for the Reformation, Robert was recommended for the office of Chief Baron in 1570, on the death of James Bathe. Robert wrote personally to the Queen's most trusted advisor William Cecil, 1st Baron Burghley, arguing his case for becoming Chief Baron on the grounds of his long and faithful service to the Crown. He had a formidable group of supporters, including Adam Loftus, Archbishop of Dublin, Hugh Brady, Bishop of Meath, and the Queen's cousin Thomas Butler, 10th Earl of Ormonde; but against their pleas, he was passed over by Elizabeth in favour of Sir Lucas Dillon, James Bathe's son-in-law, despite Dillon's known inclination to the Roman Catholic faith.

The Queen however acknowledged that if Dillon had not had what she regarded (for reasons which are unclear) as the prior claim, she would have given the post to Cusack: for "we hear very good report of him.... and so we would have you inform him that he be not in any way discouraged". He would almost certainly have received further promotion had he not died in the summer of 1570. His father outlived him by a few months.

== Marriages and children ==
He is said by some sources to have entered an underage marriage with Margaret Kiltane, which was annulled. He later married Katherine, daughter of Sir Christopher Nugent, who was a younger son of Richard Nugent, 4th Baron Delvin; her mother was Marian St Lawrence, daughter of Nicholas St Lawrence, 4th Baron Howth.

Of his children, who were all by Katherine, various sources refer to seven:

- John (died 1629) of Cussington
- Fr Christopher Cusack (died 1624), a Roman Catholic priest who founded the Irish College, Douai
- Anne, who married Richard Luttrell, a grandson of Sir Thomas Luttrell
- Margaret, who married John Plunkett, youngest son of Thomas Plunkett, 2nd Baron Louth
- Genet
- Catherine, who married Thomas Delafield
- Elizabeth, who married Gerald Fleming and was the mother of Patrick Fleming (1599-1631), who like his uncle Christopher was a prominent Roman Catholic priest, and was murdered in Prague in 1631.

His widow remarried Peter Barnewall, 6th Baron Trimlestown and had further issue by her second marriage. Francis Lavalin Nugent, the Irish Catholic priest who founded the Irish province of the Capuchin Order, was her nephew.

Robert's sister Catherine Cusack, who married Sir Henry Colley, was the ancestor of the 1st Duke of Wellington, whose family changed their name from Colley to Wellesley (Catherine and Robert had a Wellesley grandmother).
