= Robert Dillon (died 1597) =

Irish judge (died 1597)

Chief Justice of the Irish Common Pleas
- In office 1581–1597
- Preceded by: Nicholas Nugent
- Succeeded by: Nicholas Walsh

Personal details
- Born: c. 1540 Probably Riverston, County Meath
- Died: 27 July 1597 Riverston, County Meath
- Education: Lincoln's Inn

Sir Robert Dillon of Riverston (c. 1540 – 1597) was an Irish lawyer, judge, and politician. He came from a family with a distinguished record of judicial service. He pursued a successful career as a judge, which was, however, dogged by accusations of corruption and other serious wrongdoing, of which the worst was that he had falsely condemned Nicholas Nugent, another judge and rival, to death. Sir Robert Dillon, the subject of this article, must not be confused with an earlier Sir Robert Dillon of Newtown (c. 1500 – 1579), his grand-uncle, who was also Chief Justice of the Irish Common Pleas.

== Birth and origins ==
Family tree

Robert Dillon with his two wives, his parents, and other selected relatives. (Note: This family tree is based on the genealogies of the earls of Roscommon. Also see the lists of children in the text.)

James; Dillon of Riverston	Elizabeth; Bathe
Bartholomew; Dillon of Riverston d. 1533; Chief Justice	Elizabeth; Barnewall	Robert; Dillon of Newtown d. 1579; Chief Justice
Thomas; Dillon of Riverston	Anne; Luttrell	Lucas; Dillon; 1530–1592; Chief Baron
Eleanor; Alan	Robert; Dillon c. 1540 – 1597; Chief Justice	Catharine; Sarsfield d. 1615	James; 1st Earl; Roscommon d. 1641
Bartholomew; Dillon d. 1633	Catherine; Fitton	Thomas; Dillon	Robert; 2nd Earl d. 1642
Andrew; Dillon b. 1599	Arthur; Dillon	James; 3rd Earl c. 1605 – 1649

Legend

XXX	Subject of the article	XXX	Earls of Roscommon

Dillon was born about 1540, probably at Riverston, County Meath, the eldest son of Thomas Dillon and his wife, Anne Luttrell. His father was the eldest son of Sir Bartholomew Dillon, Lord Chief Justice of Ireland. His father's family comprised many holders of judicial offices and was well-connected. The Dillons were Old English and descended from Sir Henry Dillon who came to Ireland with Prince John in 1185.

His mother was a daughter of Sir Thomas Luttrell, who was Chief Justice of the Irish Common Pleas.

Dillon must not be confused with his great-uncle Sir Robert Dillon of Newtown (near Trim), although they are easyly confused as both held the same judicial office, and the records of the King's Inns do not always distinguish clearly between them.

== Career ==
Dillon was educated at Lincoln's Inn, London, where he is recorded in 1560. It was here that his lifelong enmity with Nicholas Nugent began: the two Irish law students were reprimanded for brawling by the benchers of the inn, and bound to keep the peace.

His first official appointment came in 1569 when he was made second justice of Connacht, Ireland, serving under Ralph Rokeby, the first Chief Justice of Connacht. In this capacity, he favourably impressed Sir Edward Fitton, the first Lord President of Connaught. When Fitton became Vice-Treasurer of Ireland, he secured Dillon's appointment as Chancellor of the Exchequer of Ireland. Two other powerful patrons were Adam Loftus, the Archbishop of Dublin, and Robert Weston, the Lord Chancellor of Ireland, who recommended Dillon for appointment as Master of the Rolls in Ireland, partly on account of his staunch adherence to the Church of Ireland. As Fitton's protégé, Dillon was inevitably drawn into the bitter feud that erupted in 1572-3 between Fitton and Sir William FitzWilliam, the Lord Deputy of Ireland. FitzWilliam urged the Queen to detain Dillon in the Fleet Prison, but Elizabeth I took Dillon's side in the dispute, reprimanded FitzWilliam, and persuaded him to resolve his differences with Fitton. Relations between Dillon and FitzWilliam improved in later years.

After years of lobbying for a senior judicial post, involving at least one trip to London, Dillon was, in 1577, made second justice of the Court of Common Pleas (Ireland), serving under his great-uncle Sir Robert Dillon, chief justice of the Common Pleas. On his great-uncle's death in 1580, he expected to be promoted to his place, but the position was given to his rival Nicholas Nugent. Dillon reached his aim eventually in 1581 when Nugent had to resign in the context of the revolt of his nephew William Nugent. Dillon was knighted in November 1581 by Arthur Grey, 14th Baron Grey de Wilton, the Lord Deputy. Nugent's execution in 1582 greatly damaged the reputation of a man who had always been unpopular, and caused the Queen and Lord Burghley to regard him with suspicion.

Meanwhile, Dillon was also willingly involved in the Elizabethan era religious persecution of the strictly illegal and underground Catholic Church in Ireland, even when it also meant harming his own relatives. When Dillon visited Slane Castle, which belonged to Baron Slane his first cousin by his grandmother Ismay, he recognised Archbishop Dermot O'Hurley, who sheltered there. Dillon informed the authorities at Dublin Castle. Lord Slane was immediately summoned by the lord justices, Adam Loftus and Henry Wallop, and, under pain of being charged with high treason, Lord Slane aided in the archbishop's arrest, which led to his execution.

His puzzling decision to warn the future rebel Sir Brian O'Rourke not to come to Dublin in 1589, on the grounds that he would be arrested, inevitably led to accusations that he had fomented O'Rourke's rebellion, which broke out the following year. Although Dillon was not close to Sir John Perrot, FitzWilliam's successor as Lord Deputy, Perrot's downfall damaged his career as it led the crown to scrutinise closely the conduct of all senior Irish officials, thus giving an opportunity to Dillon's many enemies to come forward.

William Nugent, who had been pardoned and restored to favour, complained that Dillon had abused his position to prosecute members of the Nugent family, and in the summer of 1591 Nugent formally accused Dillon of maladministration of justice. The case was strong: in particular, the charge that Dillon had wrongfully condemned William's uncle Nicholas Nugent, his predecessor as chief justice, to death for treason. Apart from their long-standing personal enmity, Dillon blamed Nugent for his failure to become chief justice. A colourful, though probably apocryphal story, was widely circulated that Dillon, after the execution, watching Nugent's corpse hanging from the gallows remarked "Ha, friend Nugent! I think I am even with you for coming between me and my place ...". Other charges included corruption in his role as a commissioner for the settlement of Connacht, and rather incongruously, cruelty to his mother.

In the view of Roger Wilbraham, the Solicitor General for Ireland, there was little doubt that Dillon had been guilty of crimes dishonourable to a judge, but Wilbraham considered that

It was no policy that such against whom he had done service for her Majesty should be countenanced to wrest anything hardly against him unless it was capital.

Dillon was briefly imprisoned at Dublin Castle in August 1591. He was suspended from office as a judge and commissioners were appointed to try the charges, but obstacles were constantly arising. However, in April 1593 he was dismissed as chief justice, Robert Weston was appointed in his place as chief justice. But in November Dillon was pronounced innocent on all charges and reinstated. Dillon had become very rich and there is no doubt that he used his wealth to placate influential members of the Privy Council with expensive gifts. In addition, Elizabeth and Burghley, previously hostile to Dillon, had decided that a purge of senior Irish officials would simply deprive them of valuable public servants, however questionable their conduct, a view first put forward by Roger Wilbraham.

On 23 September 1594, the day of Chief Justice Weston's death, Sir Geoffrey Fenton wrote to Lord Burghley that Dillon was to be restored to the chief-justiceship. This decision was confirmed by patent of 15 March 1595, and Dillon retained the office until his death in July 1597.

Dillon died on 27 July 1597 in Riverston and was buried at Tara, County Meath.

== Reputation ==
Elrington Ball remarks that while Dillon's conduct as a judge was deplorable, he was an eloquent public speaker, and a man of some personal charm and humour.

== Marriages and children ==
Dillon married twice, but neither of his marriages can be dated.

=== First marriage ===
He married firstly Eleanor Alan, daughter of Thomas Alen of Kilteel Castle, County Kildare and his wife Mary Rawson, natural daughter of John Rawson, Viscount Clontarf.

Robert and Eleanor had a son:

1. Richard, who predeceased his father unmarried

—and a daughter:

1. Mary, married Patrick Segrave of Killeghlan, County Meath, son of Richard Segrave

=== Second marriage ===
Dillon married secondly Catherine Sarsfield, daughter of Sir William Sarsfield of Lucan Manor, who had been Lord Mayor of Dublin in 1566, and his wife Mabel FitzGerald.

Robert and Catherine had five sons:

1. Bartholomew (died 1633), married Catherine, daughter and heiress of Alexander Fitton and his wife Mary Wyse, in about 1595, which made him owner of Bective Abbey. Bartholomew was 24 years old at his father's death.
2. William
3. Thomas, father of Arthur Dillon
4. Michael
5. Christopher

—and nine daughters of which the eldest:

1. Eleanor (died 1635), married Richard Aylmer of Dullardstown

Dillon's second wife died in 1615.

== Notes and references ==
=== Sources ===
- Ball, Francis Elrington (1926). The Judges in Ireland 1221–1921. Vol. I (1st ed.). London: John Murray. OCLC 832154869. – 1221 to 1690
- Clavin, Terry (October 2009). McGuire, James; Quinn, James (eds.). "Dillon, Sir Robert". Dictionary of Irish Biography.
- Cogan, Rev. Anthony (1862). The Diocese of Meath. Vol. I. Dublin: Joseph Dollard. OCLC 1043021954.
- Conyngham, David Power (1873). Lives of the Irish Martyrs. New York: D. J. Sadlier. OCLC 1157116727.
- Crawford, Jon G. (2004). "Dillon, Robert (c. 1540–1597)". In Matthew, Colin; Harrison, Brian (eds.). Oxford Dictionary of National Biography. Vol. 16. New York: Oxford University Press. pp. 222–223. ISBN 0-19-861366-0.
- Lodge, John (1789). Archdall, Mervyn (ed.). The Peerage of Ireland or, A Genealogical History of the Present Nobility of that Kingdom. Vol. IV. Dublin: James Moore. OCLC 264906028. – Viscounts
- Pollard, Albert Frederick (1901). "Dillon, Sir Robert (d. 1597)". In Lee, Sidney (ed.). Dictionary of National Biography Supplement. Vol. II. New York: MacMillan and Co. pp. 135–136. OCLC 9146854.
- Shaw, William A. (1906). The Knights of England. Vol. II. London: Sherratt & Hughes. – Knights bachelors & Index
- Smyth, Constantine (1839). Chronicle of the Law Officers of Ireland. London: Henry Butterworth. OCLC 1018312937.
- Webb, Alfred (1878). "Dillon, Theobald, Viscount". Compendium of Irish Biography. Dublin: M. H. Gill & Son. p. 149. OCLC 122693688.

Attribution

- This article incorporates text from a publication now in the public domain: Pollard, Albert Frederick (1895). "Dillon, Sir Robert (d. 1597)". In Lee, Sidney (ed.). Dictionary of National Biography. Vol. 41. London: Smith, Elder & Co. pp. 312–314.

Legal offices
Preceded by Nicholas Nugent	Chief Justice of the Common Pleas; 1581–1593	Succeeded by Robert Weston
Preceded by Robert Weston	Chief Justice of the Common Pleas; 1594–1597	Succeeded by Nicholas Walsh
