= Richard Segrave =

Irish judge (c.1540–1598)

Richard Segrave (c.1540–1598) was an Irish judge, remembered chiefly for sitting in judgement on his colleague Nicholas Nugent, who was the only Irish judge ever to be hanged for treason by the Government which appointed him.

== Family ==
He was the son of Patrick Segrave (died 1552), head of the prominent landowning family of Killegland, now Ashbourne, County Meath and his wife Joan Beg; the Richard Sydgrave who was Chief Baron of the Irish Exchequer 1423-5, was a direct ancestor. The first Richard's eldest son Patrick, who was murdered by Patrick White in 1455, acquired Killegland through marriage into the Wafer family. The younger Richard's date of birth is not recorded but he was still a minor when his father died. His aunt Katherine was the second wife of Alderman Robert Ussher of Santry, a member of one of Dublin's most prominent families. He entered Gray's Inn in 1560.

== Nicholas Nugent ==
In 1578 he became second Baron of the Court of Exchequer (Ireland) on the suspension of Nicholas Nugent from his office of Chief Justice of the Irish Common Pleas. This caused unfavourable comment when in 1582 Segrave was one of three judges called on to sit on a special commission at Trim, County Meath, to try Nugent, who had been restored to his position as Chief Justice, but was now charged with complicity in the rebellion of his nephew William Nugent. The trial gave rise to deep disquiet, due partly to the failure of the Crown to produce two witnesses, as normally required in a treason trial, and partly due to the perceived bias of the judges, especially Sir Robert Dillon, a lifelong enemy of Nugent.

Whether Segrave had any personal bias against Nugent is not known, but he had profited from his disgrace and was personally close to Robert Dillon (Segrave's son Patrick later married Dillon's daughter). Further, contrary to the modern principle of judicial impartiality, it was said that the judges were actually chosen for their personal knowledge of Nugent. It was also said that pressure was put on the jury to convict, although this was the usual practice in English treason trials. Nugent was found guilty and hanged, but the affair caused such unease that it was later suggested by the Dublin government that only English-born judges should sit in the Irish Courts, as Irish judges were not capable of administering impartial justice.

== Death ==
He died in 1598 and was buried at Ashbourne. He married twice and was the father of Patrick Segrave, who like his father became a Baron of the Exchequer, but was later removed from office for corruption.
