= Patrick Segrave =

Irish judge, 17th century

Patrick Segrave (died c.1610) was an Irish judge of the early seventeenth century, who was removed from office for numerous incidents of corruption.

He was born at Killegland, now Ashbourne, County Meath, son of Richard Segrave, Baron of the Court of Exchequer (Ireland) who was head of a prominent landowning family. Little is known of his mother. He married before 1589 Mary Dillon, daughter of Chief Justice Robert Dillon and his second wife Catherine Sarsfield. In 1589 his father-in-law sent him to London with gifts of hawks and horses for the Privy Council. On his father's death in 1598 Patrick was appointed to his place as a Baron of the Exchequer.

He was charged in 1602 with "diverse causes (cases)" of bribery and corruption, and stood trial before the Court of Castle Chamber, the Irish equivalent of Star Chamber. The Delahide family's lands at Dunshaughlin, County Meath had been forfeited to the Crown for treason. Segrave was accused of conspiring with Richard Read and David Russell to procure a jury to find the title to the land (i.e. award the title) in favour of Read, and of receiving a large bribe in return; he was also charged with attempting to bribe Sir Richard Cooke, the Chancellor of the Exchequer of Ireland. Segrave was found guilty, removed from office by the Lord Deputy of Ireland, fined £1000 and imprisoned at the pleasure of the Crown.

His disgrace was not permanent: in 1607 he was admitted to the King's Inns and became a member of its governing council. He attended meetings of the council until 1610, after which his name disappears from the records. The Patrick Segrave of Killeglan whose estates were forfeited for his part in the Irish Rebellion of 1641 was probably his son or grandson.
