= Thomas Fleming, 10th Baron Slane =

Irish peer and politician (died 1601)

Thomas Fleming (died 1601) was an Irish peer, and a member of the Parliament of Ireland of 1585. He was the son of James Fleming, and great-grandson of James Fleming, 7th Baron Slane. His mother was Ismay Dillon, daughter of Sir Bartholomew Dillon, Lord Chief Justice of Ireland and his first wife Elizabeth Barnewall; after his father's death she remarried Sir Thomas Barnewall of Trimlestown.

He succeeded to the barony after the death of his cousin James Fleming, 9th Baron Slane, whose marriage to Alison Dillon, daughter of Sir Robert Dillon, failed to produce an heir. He was the only Irish nobleman to serve with Walter Devereux, 1st Earl of Essex against Turlough Luineach O'Neill, head of the O'Neill dynasty and the effective ruler of Ulster, in March 1574.

Despite his family's history of Catholicism, the Baron was also reluctantly involved in the Elizabethan era religious persecution of the strictly illegal and underground Catholic Church in Ireland. While sheltering at Slane Castle, Archbishop Dermot O'Hurley, who would become one of the most celebrated of the 24 formally recognized Irish Catholic Martyrs, was recognised by the Baron's first cousin, Sir Robert Dillon, who immediately informed Dublin Castle. Baron Slane was immediately summoned by Lord Justices Adam Loftus and Henry Wallop and, under pain of being charged with high treason, the Baron agreed to arrest Archbishop Dermot O'Hurley.

While staying in Ormonde Castle at Carrick-on-Suir as a guest of Thomas Butler, 10th Earl of Ormond, Archbishop O'Hurley, was met there by his former host, Baron Slane, in September 1583. The Baron explained the imminent danger to both himself and his family and in return, the Archbishop voluntarily agreed to travel back with him and surrender at Dublin Castle.

Meanwhile, despite his own militant Protestantism, the Earl of Ormond was greatly offended and distressed at the trickery used in the arrest of a guest in his house, and afterwards he did everything he could in vain to rescue Archbishop O'Hurley from the executioners.

He was one of the leaders of the opposition to the policies of Sir John Perrot, the Lord Lieutenant of Ireland, in the 1580s. Despite this he was regarded as a loyal servant of the English Crown, and enjoyed the personal regard of Queen Elizabeth I.

He married Catherine Preston, daughter of Jenico Preston, 3rd Viscount Gormanston and Lady Catherine FitzGerald, daughter of Gerald FitzGerald, 9th Earl of Kildare. They had three daughters, Katherine, Margaret and Eleanor. Later Barons of Slane were descended from Eleanor, who married her father's heir, her cousin William, 11th Baron Slane, son of George Fleming, another descendant of the 7th Baron, and his wife Mary Cusack. Her sister Katherine married Piers FitzThomas Butler, illegitimate son of Thomas Butler, 10th Earl of Ormonde. Their descendants held the title Viscount Galmoye. Margaret married John D'Arcy.

== Sources ==
- Burke's Peerage Third Edition London 1846
- George Edward Cokayne, ed. Geoffrey F. White. The Complete Peerage. (London: St. Catherine Press, 1953) Vol. XII, Part 1, p. 11=13.

Peerage of Ireland
Preceded by James Fleming	Baron Slane; 1578–1598	Succeeded by William Fleming
