= Simon Rochfort =

English-born Irish bishop

Simon Rochfort (also Simon de Rupeforti; died 1224) was an English bishop of Meath in Ireland.

== Life ==
Rochfort was the first Englishman to hold the see of Meath, to which he was consecrated in 1194. He was one of the judges appointed by Pope Innocent III in the suit for possession of the body of Hugh de Lacy, 5th Baron Lacy and first lord of Meath, between the monks of Bective, County Meath and the canons of St. Thomas's, Dublin. He gave sentence in favour of the latter in 1205.

He founded a house of regular canons at Newtown Abbey, near Trim in 1206, and ultimately erected the church into the cathedral of St Peter and St Paul, abandoning the old cathedral of Clonard. At Newtown he held a synod in 1216, of which an account is extant. He allotted vicars' portions to the churches in his diocese.

He died in 1224 and was buried in the church at Newtown.

== Bibliography ==
- This article incorporates text from a publication now in the public domain: "Rochfort, Simon". Dictionary of National Biography. London: Smith, Elder & Co. 1885–1900.
