= Patrick Bermingham =

Irish judge and politician

Patrick Bermingham (c.1460–1532) was an Irish judge and statesman of the Tudor period who held the offices of Lord Chief Justice of Ireland and Chancellor of the Exchequer of Ireland. He was a firm supporter of English rule in Ireland and enjoyed the confidence of Henry VIII, who regarded him as a mainstay of the Irish administration.

== Background ==
He was born in Corbally, County Meath, into the Meath branch of the leading Anglo-Irish dynasty of Bermingham, which was founded by Meyler de Bermingham about 1270. Patrick's grandfather, a member of the Carbury branch of the family, settled in Meath where he acquired by marriage estates at Dardistown; the family also held lands at Johnstown, County Kildare.

Not much is known about Patrick's own parents, except that they had another son, John, who was the elder. Patrick, like many younger sons of landed families, chose the law as his profession, probably following in the steps of his cousin Philip Bermingham, who was Lord Chief Justice of Ireland in the 1480s. He entered Lincoln's Inn in 1478. On the death of his brother John in 1483 he inherited the family estates. He resided in England for some years but returned to Ireland before 1503.

== Career ==
He became a clerk in the Court of Exchequer (Ireland); from this relatively junior position, he rose quickly to the office of Lord Chief Justice in 1513. For the next twenty years Irish politics was dominated by the struggle between the faction led by the 9th Earl of Kildare, who succeeded to his father's title in 1513, and his opponents; Elrington Ball states that Bermingham was one of the few public figures who remained above partisan politics, his sole aim, as far as can be judged, being to maintain peace and good order. This is borne out by the favourable account of Bermingham's conduct given by the Lord Deputy of Ireland, the Earl of Surrey, who spent much of 1520–21 putting down an insurrection which he suspected, with good reason, had been instigated by the Earl of Kildare. Norfolk praised Bermingham and Patrick Finglas, the Lord Chief Baron, as "the best willed and most diligent to do the King's Grace true and faithful service of all the learned men of this land".

Bermingham was appointed Chancellor of the Exchequer, was made a member of the Privy Council, and as a mark of special favour was given a fresh patent as Lord Chief Justice under the Great Seal of England. As another mark of Royal favour, he was given permission to leave Ireland whenever he wished. This was a significant privilege at a time when the movements of Irish officials, even those considered loyal to the Crown, were carefully watched, and all foreign travel, even a simple crossing to England, required permission from the Crown.

After Norfolk's recall to England, Bermingham worked closely with the Archbishop of Dublin, Hugh Inge, and later with Inge's successor, John Alen. For a time Bermingham, Archbishop Alen and the Prior of Kilmainham, John Rawson (later Viscount Clontarf), were said to form an inner "council of three" within the main Privy Council. Despite Kildare's rather dubious loyalties, Bermingham was sensible enough to see that his great power and influence made it impossible to exclude him from a prominent share in the Irish Government, and that English rule in Ireland had been weakened by his four-year detention in England. In 1528 he and Inge wrote to Surrey, now Duke of Norfolk, lamenting the chaos in Ireland "since the Earl of Kildare's departing from hence", and severely criticising the misrule of Kildare's deputy Richard Nugent, 4th Lord Delvin. Perhaps in part due to Bermingham's pleas, Kildare did return to Ireland, only to quarrel bitterly with Archbishop Alen and with Norfolk's successor as Lord Deputy, Sir William Skeffington. When Bermingham died in 1532 the political situation in Ireland was as unsettled as ever.

== Marriage and children ==
He married Katherine Preston, daughter of Robert Preston, 1st Viscount Gormanston and Janet, daughter of Sir Richard Molyneux and his first wife Jane Haydock. They had several daughters, and two sons, Walter and William. William married Margaret St Lawrence, daughter and heiress of Thomas St. Lawrence, Attorney General for Ireland, by whom he had eight children, including Patrick, his eldest son and heir.

== Character ==
Ball praises him as a man of integrity and moderation, who was dedicated to the maintenance of good order in Ireland.

== Notes ==
Legal offices
Preceded by John Topcliffe	Lord Chief Justice of Ireland; 1513–1532	Succeeded by Sir Bartholomew Dillon
