= James Bathe =

Irish judge

James Bathe (c.1500–1570) was an Irish judge of the Tudor era, who was notable for serving as Chief Baron of the Irish Exchequer for thirty years under four successive monarchs. He was the grandfather of the 1st Earl of Roscommon, and of the noted musicologist William Bathe.

== Background ==
He was born at Beshellstown, Clonalvy, County Meath to a long-established Anglo-Irish family, the main branch of which was settled at Athcarne Castle, near Duleek: they had also held lands at Rathfeigh since about 1400. The Bathe family had a disputed claim to the title Baron Louth, but lost it to the Plunketts. Sir Thomas Bathe, styled Baron Louth, an earlier Chief Baron, belonged to the same family, as did John Bathe, Chief Justice of the Irish Common Pleas. James entered Middle Temple in 1522 and acted as Master of the Revels in the Temple in 1524.

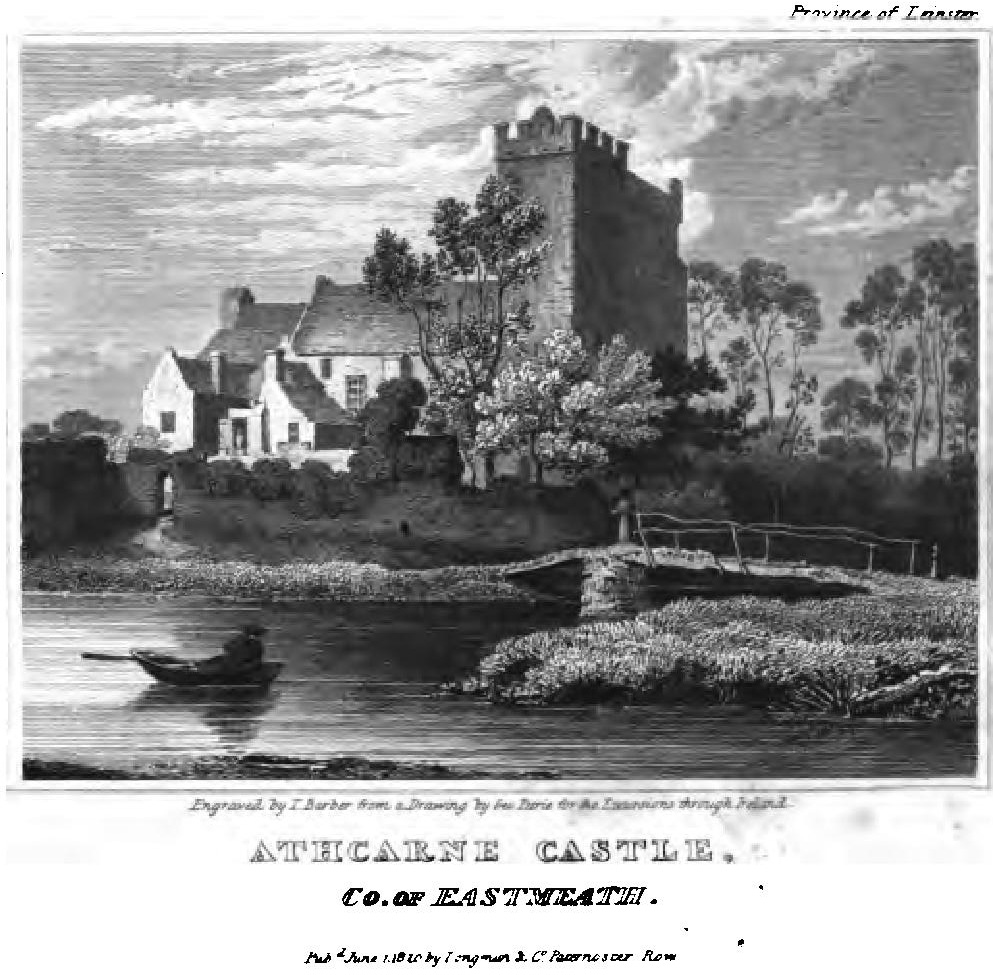
Athcarne Castle, the ancestral home of the Bathe family c.1820

== Career ==
In the early stages of his career, he was a firm adherent of Gerald FitzGerald, 9th Earl of Kildare. In 1525 while on a visit to England, he took the opportunity to present the Crown with a book he had written on the need for reformation of the governance of Ireland, and how to achieve it. This step aroused the hostility of the increasingly powerful Cowley family: Robert Cowley, the head of the family, warned Cardinal Wolsey that the book was in fact an effort to persuade King Henry VIII that there was no solution to Ireland's problems but the return to power of Kildare, who was then in temporary disgrace. Cowley wrote contemptuously that Bathe "knows as much about Ireland as I do about Italy", and should be "touched (i.e. rebuked) for his presumption".

He narrowly escaped being implicated in the rebellion of Silken Thomas. In addition to his loyal service to Thomas's father, the 9th Earl of Kildare, he was a friend of several of the rebels, and had recently married the daughter of John Burnell of Balgriffin, one of the ringleaders of the rebellion. Robert Cowley and his son Walter Cowley continued their attacks on him, arguing that he was unfit to be appointed to even a minor administrative post, for "his conduct is disagreeable to the duty of a true subject" (no doubt this was an accusation of disloyalty during the recent rebellion).

Fortunately for Bathe, he had some influential friends, including Thomas St. Lawrence, the Attorney General for Ireland, through whom he gained the confidence of the Lord Deputy, Leonard Grey, and was sent by him to report to Thomas Cromwell on the state of the Irish government. He survived Grey's downfall and execution for treason in 1540 and played a considerable role in the Dissolution of the Monasteries. He outwardly conformed to the Church of Ireland but is said to have remained a member of the Roman Catholic Church in private.

He was appointed the Irish Chief Baron in 1540 and held office under each successive Tudor monarch until his death in 1570, being commended for his good service to the Crown, despite some complaints about his slowness in collecting revenue. He was a diligent administrator until his last years but played little part in formulating Government policy. In his last years, his health and faculties began to fail, and there were numerous complaints about his incapacity for office. Sir Henry Sidney, the Lord Deputy of Ireland wrote to Elizabeth I caustically in 1567 about the state of the Exchequer of Ireland as a result of Bathe's infirmity: "God knoweth how your revenues and finances are there ordered".

== Family and property ==
He married firstly Marjorie Ballard of Drogheda, who died sometime after 1530, and secondly Elizabeth Burnell, daughter of John Burnell of Balgriffin, and widow of Robert Barnewall of Drimnagh Castle. By his second wife he had at least two children:

- John Bathe of Drumcondra Castle, Attorney General for Ireland and Chancellor of the Irish Exchequer (died 1586), who married twice and had eight children including-
  - William Bathe, the well-known Jesuit writer and musician.
- Jane Bathe (died before 1578), who married Sir Lucas Dillon, who succeeded his father-in-law as Chief Baron; they were parents of twelve children, seven sons and five daughters, including -
  - James Dillon, 1st Earl of Roscommon.

James Bathe became a very substantial landowner in Dublin: he acquired Drimnagh Castle through marriage and began before 1560 the building of another castle at Drumcondra, which his son completed, as well as acquiring lands north of the River Liffey. Like other landowners of the time he was not always scrupulous in his means of acquisition: in 1551 he and his wife received a royal pardon for "intruding" on lands which should have passed to Edward Barnewall, her son by her first husband. James's son John added greatly to the family's landholdings, but most of it was lost over the next two generations. James's wealth attracted unwelcome attention from the criminal world and he was the victim of a burglary in 1560. A woman called Anne Walshe was convicted of stealing a silver candlestick from his Drumcondra home, but later received a pardon for the crime.

His daughter Jane is buried beside her husband Sir Lucas at Newtown Abbey, near Trim, County Meath. Their tomb, which still exists, has the curious local nickname "the tomb of the jealous man and woman". The name may originate from the fact that the effigies of Jane and Lucas are separated by a sword of state, which may hint at an estrangement between them.

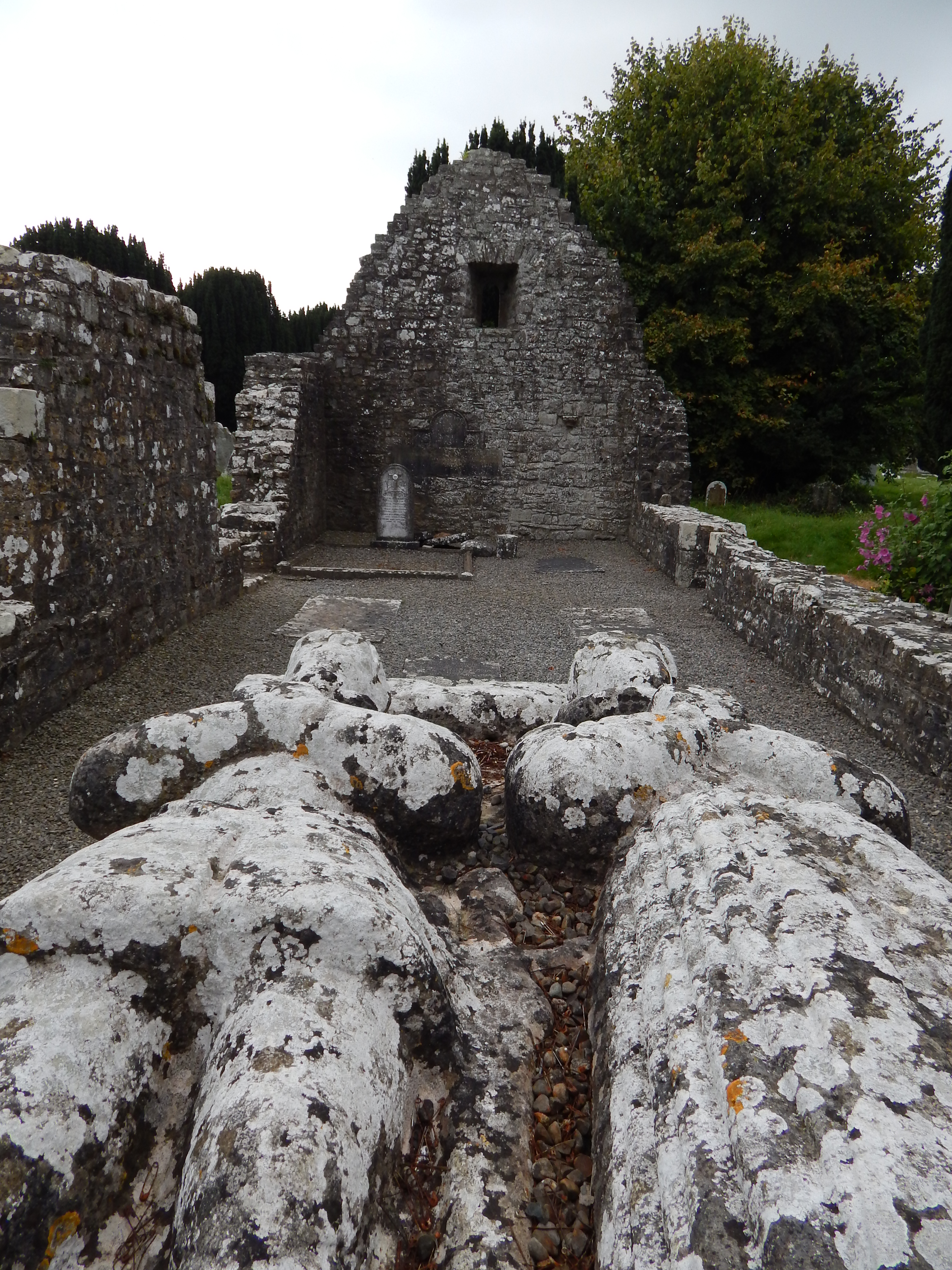
"The tomb of the jealous man and woman"- the tomb of Bathe's daughter Jane and her husband Sir Lucas Dillon, Newtown Abbey, Trim
