= Nicholas St Lawrence, 4th Baron Howth =

Irish soldier and statesman

Nicholas St Lawrence, 4th Baron Howth (c. 1460 – 1526) was a leading Irish nobleman, soldier and statesman of the early Tudor period, who held the office of Lord Chancellor of Ireland.

== Early life ==
He was born about 1460, eldest son of Robert St Lawrence, 3rd Baron Howth and his first wife Alice White, daughter of Nicholas White, and heiress of the manor of Killester. His stepmother Joan Beaufort was a cousin of King Henry VII, to whom Nicholas, unlike most of the Anglo-Irish nobility, remained steadfastly loyal. The date of his father's death and his own succession to the title is uncertain but it was probably before 1487.

== Lambert Simnel ==
The pretender Lambert Simnel appeared in Ireland in 1487, claiming to be Edward, Earl of Warwick, nephew of Edward IV, to whom he bore a striking resemblance, and thus to be the rightful King of England. Warwick's claim to the English Crown was far stronger than that of Henry VII, who had only a tenuous claim to the throne through his mother (The real Earl of Warwick was kept a close prisoner in the Tower of London until his execution for treason in 1499). Simnel gained the support of most of the Anglo-Irish nobility, notably the powerful 8th Earl of Kildare, and was crowned as "King Edward VI" at Christ Church Cathedral in Dublin 1487. Nicholas, however, no doubt mindful of his own family's close connection to the Tudor dynasty, warned Henry VII of the impending invasion. Following Henry's triumph at the Battle of Stoke Field, Nicholas was rewarded with a substantial grant of money (this was noteworthy in itself as Henry, throughout his reign, was notorious for his parsimony) and the confirmation of his right to the Lordship of Howth.

The King, however, could not resist playing a joke by inviting Howth and ten other Irish nobles (nearly all of whom had received a royal pardon for their share in the rebellion), to a banquet at Greenwich in 1489 where, to their great embarrassment, they were waited on at table by Lambert Simnel, who had also been pardoned and made a kitchen boy (he was later promoted to the office of Falconer).

Howth attended the sessions of the Irish Parliament held in 1490 and 1493. He succeeded his father as one of the Knights of the Brotherhood of Saint George, a short-lived standing army entrusted with the defence of Dublin and the surrounding counties.

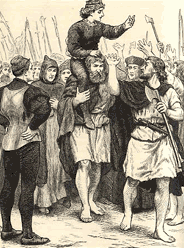
Lambert Simnel in Ireland

== Battle of Knockdoe ==
Despite their differences over the Simnel rebellion, Howth became a close ally of Kildare (who like Simnel, and most of the Irish nobility, had received a pardon from Henry VII), and he later challenged Thomas Butler, 7th Earl of Ormond to a duel on Kildare's account. He also quarrelled with Sir James Butler, Ormonde's cousin, who predicted, wrongly, that Nicholas' stout and bullish nature would end with his violent death. Kildare and Howth fought together at the notoriously bloody Battle of Knockdoe in 1504 between the forces of the Crown and the Burkes of Connaught. Howth is credited with arguing for the immediate attack which resulted in a victory for the Crown's forces, against the advice of more cautious colleagues who urged that they retreat or try to negotiate.

== Lord Chancellor of Ireland ==
Lord Howth was Lord Chancellor of Ireland from 1509 to 1513. O'Flanagan suggests that his entire training had been as a soldier, so that the appointment was presumably a tribute to his loyalty to the Crown and his close links to Kildare, rather than due to his legal ability. On the other hand, his father had briefly held the same office in 1483, and his uncle Walter St. Lawrence and his brother Thomas St Lawrence were both distinguished lawyers, so it is likely enough that Nicholas also had some legal training. O'Flanagan notes that his career as Lord Chancellor leaves no trace on the records, but that in the absence of any complaints about his performance, he presumably fulfilled his duties adequately enough. He was a founder member of the Guild of the Fraternity of the Blessed Virgin Mary of the House of St Thomas the Martyr, one of the Guilds of the City of Dublin, which protected the interests of carpenters, millers, masons and tilers.

The death of his great patron, the Earl of Kildare, in 1513 meant the end of Howth's political career, as the anti-Kildare faction sought to exclude his supporters from power;he was dismissed from the Lord Chancellorship and the Privy Council of Ireland and lived largely in retirement until his death in 1526.

== Family ==
Lord Howth married three times and had children with each marriage. His first wife was Genet (or Jenet) Plunkett, daughter of Christopher Plunket, 2nd Baron Killeen, by his wife Elizabeth Welles, daughter of Sir William Welles, Lord Chancellor of Ireland, and Anne Barnewall. Genet was a distant cousin of Lord Howth through his grandmother Anne Plunkett. His second wife was Anne, daughter of Thomas Berford, and widow of Mr. Bermingham of Baldongan; and his third wife, who outlived him, was Alison Fitzsimon, daughter of Robert Fitzsimon, sister of Walter Fitzsimon, Archbishop of Dublin, and widow of Sir Nicholas Cheevers. After Lord Howth's death, Alison made the third marriage into the Plunkett family.

He had eleven children. Christopher, the eldest son, was Genet Plunkett's son, as were four of the daughters. Christopher's own wife Alice Bermingham was his stepmother Ann Berford's daughter by her first husband. Ann and Lord Howth had three children, Amory, Robert and Katherine. William and Marian were the children of his third marriage to Alison Fitzsimon.

The children were:

- Christopher St Lawrence, 5th Baron Howth
- Amory;
- Robert;
- William
- Thomas;
- Katherine, who married Sir John Plunkett;
- Marian, who married firstly Sir Christopher Nugent, by whom she was the mother of the 5th Baron Delvin, Nicholas Nugent, Chief Justice of the Irish Common Pleas and Katherine, wife of the senior judge Robert Cusack; she married secondly Sir Gerald Fitzgerald, Knight Marshal of Ireland, and thirdly John Parker, the Master of the Rolls in Ireland, by whom she had two children;
- Eleanor, who married Sir Walter Cheevers, (who was her stepmother Alison's son by a previous marriage);
- Margaret, who married Sir William Darcy, Vice-Treasurer of Ireland;
- Elizabeth, who married Thomas Netterville, judge of the Court of Common Pleas but had no issue;
- Alison, who married firstly John Netterville of Dowth, a cousin of Thomas Netterville, and ancestor of the 1st Viscount Netterville; and secondly Sir Patrick White, Baron of the Court of Exchequer, by whom she had two sons including the writer and political reformer Rowland White, and a daughter;
- Anne, who married Thomas Cusack.

Peerage of Ireland
Preceded by Robert St Lawrence	Baron Howth c.1488–1526	Succeeded by Christopher St Lawrence
