= Killeglan =

Killeglan is the name of two places in Ireland:

- Ashbourne, County Meath, a town, once called Killeglan
- A townland in County Roscommon – see List of townlands of County Roscommon
