= Irish Law Times =

The Irish Law Times (ISSN 1649-4164) is a refereed professional law journal for practising and academic lawyers. First established in 1865 (as the Irish Law Times and Solicitors Journal), and re-established in the 1980s by Round Hall Press as the Irish Law Times, it is published in 20 editions each year by Thomson Reuters.

Andrew McKeown, a practising barrister, has edited the journal since 2023, following the death of the journal's long-standing editor David P Boyle, who had edited the journal since 2000.
