= Nicholas Nugent =

Anglo-Irish judge

Nicholas Nugent (c. 1525–1582) was an Anglo-Irish judge, who was hanged for treason by the government that appointed him. He had, before his downfall, enjoyed a highly successful career, holding office as Solicitor General for Ireland, Baron of the Irish Court of Exchequer, and Chief Justice of the Irish Common Pleas, but he was ruined by the rebellion of his nephew William Nugent, which he was accused of supporting.

== Background and early career ==
Nicholas Nugent was born between 1525 and 1530. Like many Irish judges of the time, he belonged to the Anglo-Irish aristocracy of the Pale. His father Sir Christopher Nugent (died 1531) was the son and heir of Richard Nugent, 4th Baron Delvin; his mother was Marian St Lawrence, daughter of Nicholas St Lawrence, 4th Baron Howth and his third wife Alison Fitzsimon. His father predeceased his grandfather and the title passed to Nicholas' elder brother Richard, who died in 1559, leaving two sons: Christopher Nugent, the sixth Baron, and William. His mother made two further marriages: her second husband was Sir Gerald FitzGerald, Knight Marshal of Ireland, and after his death, she married thirdly John Parker, who was a senior judge and a key figure in the Dublin administration.

Nicholas married Janet Plunket, daughter of Sir John Plunket, Lord Chief Justice of Ireland and his second wife Catherine Luttrell, and widow of Thomas Marward, titular Baron Skryne; they had one surviving son, Richard. Nicholas was given the wardship of his stepdaughter, who was also named Janet. The younger Janet, styled Baroness Skryne, was a considerable heiress and Nicholas resolved that she should marry his nephew William. The marriage duly took place, but only after William caused a scandal by abducting her.

Nicholas entered Lincoln's Inn in 1558. His future rival for judicial office, Sir Robert Dillon, was there at the same time, and their lifelong enmity seems to have begun when they were students: in 1560 they were ordered by the Benchers of the Inn to stop fighting, and were bound over to keep the peace. Nugent also quarrelled with his chamber fellow, John Talbot of Robertstown, who drew his sword and attacked Nugent, for which offence he was bound over and fined.

== Later career ==
On his return to Ireland, Nugent advanced rapidly in his career: he was made Solicitor-General for Ireland in 1565, elevated to the bench as Baron of the Court of Exchequer, and was recommended for the office of Master of the Rolls in Ireland, which had been held from 1552 to 1564 by his stepfather, John Parker. His irascible temper, so evident when he was a student, did not improve, and in 1576 another High Court judge, Richard Talbot, sued him before the Court of Castle Chamber (the Irish equivalent of Star Chamber) for riot and unlawful assembly; the charges were dismissed for lack of sufficient evidence.

His career suffered a further check when he joined in the cess controversy, which involved a concerted policy of opposition by the landowning class to the taxation policies of the Lord Deputy of Ireland, Sir Henry Sidney. He was twice suspended from office in 1577–78 and imprisoned, but was restored to favour after making his submission. The controversy does not seem to have created any serious concerns about his loyalty, no doubt because many other eminent lawyers also opposed the cess. Even the Lord Chancellor of Ireland, Sir William Gerard, had doubts about the wisdom of Sidney's taxation policy, as after some reflection did the Queen herself. Gerard thought highly of Nugent, and it was on his recommendation that he was made Chief Justice in 1580. Within little over a year, however, the actions of his nephews brought about his downfall.

The loyalty of both his nephews to Elizabeth I was deeply suspect: Lord Delvin was to die in prison awaiting trial in 1602 and, while William was eventually pardoned, this came too late to save his uncle. Both were suspected of supporting the rebellion of James Eustace, 3rd Viscount Baltinglass, and when William was exempted from the general pardon after the rebellion, he took up arms. Nicholas' lifelong enemy, Sir Robert Dillon, who had been passed over as Chief Justice in Nugent's favour, went to London and evidently persuaded the Crown to suspend Nicholas from office as a suspected traitor and put him on trial, an action which public opinion in Ireland attributed to Dillon's spite and envy.

== Trial and execution ==
The Lord Deputy, Arthur Grey, 14th Baron Grey de Wilton, has been described as seeing his role of Deputy as "a largely military one". Perhaps for this reason the unusual decision was taken to conduct Nugent's trial for treason in a manner which, according to critical historians, "had the appearance of martial law". It was held in Trim, rather than Dublin, allegedly for convenience, and Grey appointed a special commission to assist him, which included Sir Robert Dillon, his cousin the Chief Baron Lucas Dillon, and Richard Segrave, who had replaced Nugent on the Court of Exchequer. In contrast to the modern view that judges should come to a case without bias, these men seem to have been chosen precisely because they knew Nugent personally. He did however have the benefit of trial by jury in the normal way.

The law then required two witnesses to an act of treason, but at Nugent's trial only one witness, John Cusack, appeared to testify that Nugent knew of and encouraged William's rebellion. Nugent, like all those charged with treason in Ireland until the middle of the eighteenth century, was denied the right to legal counsel, but given his own legal expertise this was presumably less of a difficulty for him than it would have been for a layman, and he conducted his own defence with great spirit. He accused Robert Dillon of having bribed Cusack to commit perjury, and it seems that much of the trial was taken up by Dillon defending himself against charges of misconduct. To bolster the evidence, Grey claimed that Nicholas had privately confessed his guilt to Mr Waterhouse, a royal clerk. Whether or not the judges came to the trial with their minds made up, they seem to have had little doubt as to the verdict which the jury should bring in. According to later reports the jury wished to acquit Nugent, and it required considerable efforts by the judges to make them convict.

Nugent was found guilty, along with his co-accused Edward Cusack, and hanged at Trim on 13 April. There were claims that the jury were coerced by the judges, which is likely enough. John Philipps Kenyon writes that until the 1670s it was considered quite proper for a judge to bring strong pressure on a jury to find the "right" verdict (i.e. guilty), and the practice of a judge "suggesting" that the jury bring in the required verdict continued into the 1690s. Further, the jury would probably have been aware that the Crown had the right to punish jurors for acquitting an accused person in the face of strong evidence of their guilt, as would happen to a County Kildare jury in 1586.

== Aftermath ==
A story quickly circulated that Robert Dillon, at the hanging, remarked: "Friend Nugent, I am even with you now for coming between me and my place (i.e the office of Chief Justice)". Elrington Ball doubts the truth of the story, but as he remarks the fact that it was told at all is an indication of the unease that the case aroused. A further cause of uneasiness was the full pardon granted to Edward Cusack, son of Sir Thomas Cusack, late Lord Chancellor of Ireland, who had been convicted along with Nugent. Rightly or wrongly this was taken as a tacit admission that Nugent had been innocent, as was the later decision to restore his forfeited estates to his son Richard.

A few years later the then Lord Deputy of Ireland recommended that only English judges be appointed in Ireland, as Irish-born judges decided cases purely on family or local loyalties. Roger Wilbraham, who became Solicitor General for Ireland soon after the trial, thought that Robert Dillon's conduct at the Nugent trial, in particular, had been disgraceful, but argued pragmatically that those like Dillon who did the Queen good service should not be "pressed hard" for anything less than a capital offence. Sir Robert's cousin Lucas escaped any serious censure for his part in Nugent's death, largely because he had always been a favourite of the Queen, and after a brief period of coolness, she restored him to favour.

== Assessment ==
Elrington Ball states that Nugent's fate was unique: two men who had previously served as judges in Ireland, Miles Corbet and John Cook, were executed in London at the Restoration of 1660 for treason against Charles I, but in no other case than Nugent's did the Government in Ireland execute one of its own judges.

Whether Nugent was guilty of treason, or even of the lesser crime of misprision of treason, is difficult to say. The verdict aroused a good deal of popular unease, due to the dubious quality of the evidence and the apparent bias of the judges. The Crown had rewarded Nugent generously, and it is difficult to see what he had to gain by rebellion. However he and his nephew William were close, and it is possible that he knew of William's plans: even if he disapproved of them, this would arguably make him guilty of misprision of treason. Against that, public opinion seems to have leaned strongly towards a belief in his complete innocence.
