= Thomas St. Lawrence (judge) =

Thomas St. Lawrence, also called Thomas Howth (c.1480–1553) was a leading statesman and judge in sixteenth-century Ireland. He held the offices of Attorney General for Ireland and justice of the Court of King's Bench (Ireland) and was a member of the Privy Council of Ireland. He is remembered today mainly for his efforts to save the life of John Alen, Archbishop of Dublin, who was murdered during the Rebellion of Silken Thomas. He was also noted for his opposition to the Reformation. The latter stance led to a bitter clash with the leading Protestant reformer John Bale, Bishop of Ossory. The St Lawrence family were Barons and later Earls of Howth, hence his alternative name, Thomas Howth.

== Background ==
He was a younger son of Robert St Lawrence, 3rd Baron Howth. His date of birth and his mother's identity are unclear. His brother Nicholas St Lawrence, 4th Baron Howth, their father's son by his first wife, Alice White, was born around 1460; but Thomas, who was a student in 1503 and still strong and healthy enough to undertake a long journey in 1553, must have been considerably younger. Elrington Ball is therefore probably correct in arguing that Thomas was one of the sons of the 3rd Baron by his second marriage to Joan Beaufort, daughter of Edmund Beaufort, 2nd Duke of Somerset, which took place in 1478. This would put Thomas's birth at around 1480. Joan was a close relative of King Henry VII on his mother's side, which, if Thomas was her son, would help explain his rise to high political office, since the King was always good to his mother's family.

== Early career ==
He entered Lincoln's Inn in 1503, and was still a member of the Inn in 1515. He was back in Ireland by 1522 when he stood surety for Gerald FitzGerald, 9th Earl of Kildare, who was suspected of inciting rebellion. He was appointed Attorney General for Ireland in 1532, and second justice of the Court of King's Bench in 1535; he was also Chief Remembrancer of the Exchequer of Ireland (the official with responsibility for arranging the files for the judges to read). He was given a seat on the Irish Privy Council, an unusual honour for a relatively junior judge, and one which suggests that he was held in high regard by the Crown. He married the widowed Margaret Holywood of Artane, and was the guardian of his stepson, the youthful Holywood heir, Nicholas. He was living at Artane Castle when the Silken Thomas rebellion broke out in 1534: the cause of the rebellion was the false report that Silken Thomas' father, the ninth Earl of Kildare, had been executed.

== Murder of Archbishop Alen ==
Kildare and Archbishop Alen had long been on bad terms; when the rumour of Kildare's death reached Ireland, Alen was accused of arranging his murder (in fact the Earl had died of natural causes). Fearing for his life, the Archbishop tried to flee to England, but his boat ran aground at Clontarf. He sought refuge in Artane Castle, whether because St. Lawrence was a friend of his, or simply because it was the nearest shelter he could find, is unclear. St. Lawrence willingly took him in, but his whereabouts were discovered and he was captured. He was brought before Silken Thomas who gave the ambiguous order in the Irish language Beir uaim an bodach ("take this fellow away") whereupon his followers, John Teeling and Nicholas Wafer, killed the Archbishop. Whether Silken Thomas intended to have Alen killed has never been clear, but no harm came to St. Lawrence for sheltering him. St. Lawrence was one of those later entrusted with putting down the rebellion.

== Later controversies ==
He was opposed to the Reformation, but like many of the Anglo-Irish nobility, he was eventually persuaded of the advantages which would flow from the Suppression of the Monasteries, and he served on the commission for their suppression in 1541. He was one of the original lessees of the King's Inn and signed the petition for the title to the property to be transferred to the lessees in 1542. He resigned as Remembrancer in 1544 and received a pension for his services, but he remained on the Privy Council. He received thanks from the Government of Edward VI for his faithful and diligent service in 1547.

His good service to the Crown did not extend to support for the Church of Ireland, and on King Edward VI's death, he took the opportunity to undermine the authority of the late King's Irish bishops. In particular, he attacked John Bale, Bishop of Ossory, who was a gifted and prolific writer but an exceptionally quarrelsome individual, who was nicknamed "bilious Bale". Despite his advanced age, St. Lawrence travelled to Kilkenny to urge the public to oust Bale from office and to return to the Roman Catholic faith. His campaign was successful, and Bale soon left Ireland; St. Lawrence himself died a few months later.

He and his wife Margaret had one daughter, also called Margaret, who married William Bermingham, son of his colleague Patrick Bermingham and Katherine Preston, by whom she had eight children, including Patrick, the eldest son and heir.
