= William Nugent =

16th-century Hiberno-Norman rebel

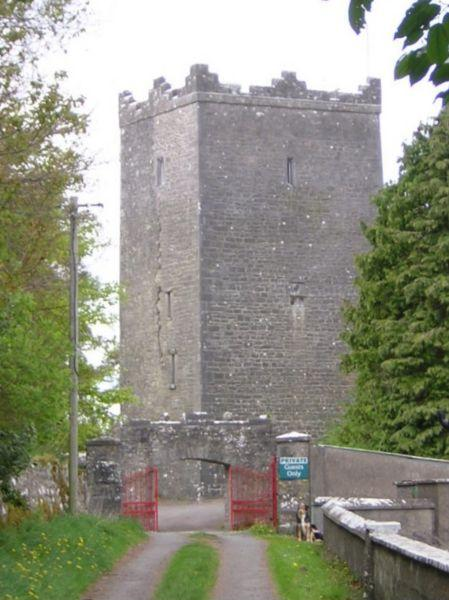
Ross Castle, County Meath, was William Nugent's castle on the shores of Lough Sheelin.

William Nugent (Irish: Uilliam Nuinseann) (1550–1625) was a Hiberno-Norman Irish rebel in the 16th century Kingdom of Ireland, brother of Christopher, fourteenth baron of Delvin (Sixth Baron Delvin), and the younger son of Richard Nugent, thirteenth baron of Delvin, from whom he inherited the manor and castle of Ross in County Meath. His mother was Elizabeth Preston, daughter of Jenico Preston, 3rd Viscount Gormanston, and widow of Thomas Nangle, feudal Baron of Navan.

== Life and politics ==
He first acquired notoriety in December 1573 by his forcible abduction and marriage of Jane (Janet) Marward, an heiress and the titular Baroness Skryne, and ward of his uncle, Nicholas Nugent. He was for a short time in May 1575 placed under restraint on suspicion of being implicated in the refusal of his brother, Lord Delvin, to sign the proclamation of rebellion against the Earl of Desmond.

On 10 April 1577 he and his wife had livery granted them of the lands of her father Walter Marward, the late Baron Skryne, valued at 130 lbs. a year. He was suspected of sympathising with the rebellion of Viscount Baltinglass, but eluded capture by taking refuge with Toirdhealbhach Luinneach Ó Néill, who refused to surrender him.

He was excluded by name from the general pardon offered by the adherents of Lord Baltinglass, and by the unwise severity of Lord Grey he was driven to take up arms on his own account. With the assistance of the Ó Conchúir and Kavanagh septs, he created considerable disturbance on the borders of the Pale. The rising, though violent, was short-lived. Nugent spent much of the winter without shelter. His friends were afraid to communicate with him.

Nugent's wife, out of 'the dutiful love of a wife to husband in that extremity', managed to send him some shirts. She was found out and punished with a year's imprisonment. Finally, in January 1582, with the assistance of Turlough Luineach, he escaped to Scotland, and from there made his way through France to Rome. Shortly afterwards, his uncle Nicholas, who had already been removed from his office as Chief Justice of the Irish Common Pleas, was charged with inciting William to rebellion, found guilty of treason, and hanged.

William at first met with a chilling reception in Rome but when the scheme of a Spanish invasion of England began to take definite shape, he was frequently consulted by the Cardinal of Como and Giacomo Buoncompagno, nephew of Gregory XIII, as to the prospects of a general insurrection in Ireland.

About Easter 1584 he was ordered to Paris, where he had an audience with Archbishop Beaton and the Duke of Guise, by whom he was sent, 'in company of certain Scottish lairds and household servants of the king of Scots' with letters in cipher to James VI and the Master of Gray. Later in the summer, he made his way back to Ulster, disguised as a friar. Information reached Perrot in September that he was harboured by Maguire and O'Rourke, but that otherwise, he had not met with much support. Perrot hoped to be shortly in possession of his head; but November drew to a close without having realised his object, and he finally consented to offer him a pardon. The offer was accepted, and in December Nugent formally submitted.

Meanwhile, his wife had, on the intercession of the Earl of Ormonde, been restored to her possessions, and Nugent, though figuring in Fitzwilliam's list of discontented persons, quietly recovered his old position and influence.

He never forgave Sir Robert Dillon for the pertinacity with which he prosecuted his family, and in the summer of 1591, he formally accused him of maladministration of justice. His case was a strong one, and, it was generally admitted, contained strong presumptive evidence of Dillon's guilt. Roger Wilbraham, the Solicitor General for Ireland said that there was little doubt that Dillon had been guilty of inferior crimes dishonourable to a judge, but 'it was no policy that such against whom he had done service for her majesty should be countenanced to wrest anything hardly against him unless it was capital.' This was also Fitzwilliam's opinion; while commissioners were appointed to try the charges against Dillon, obstacles of one sort and another constantly arose. In November 1593 Dillon was pronounced innocent of all the accusations against him.

The rest of Nugent's life was uneventful. In 1606 James I consented to restore him to his blood and inheritance. A bill for the purpose was transmitted to the privy council in 1613. But it was not returned, having been found unfit to pass the Irish Parliament. Nugent died on 30 June 1625.

He and his wife, Janet Marward, had three sons: Robert, who died on 1 May 1616; Christopher, who died unmarried, and James, marshal of the army of the confederates and governor of Finagh, by whose rebellion the family estate was finally forfeited.

== Shakespeare authorship candidate ==
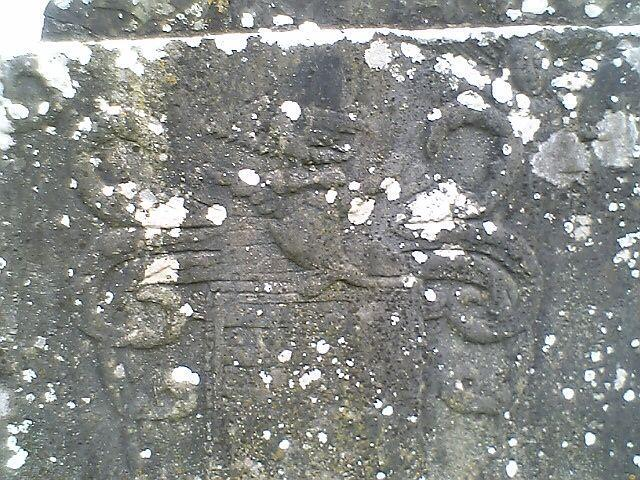
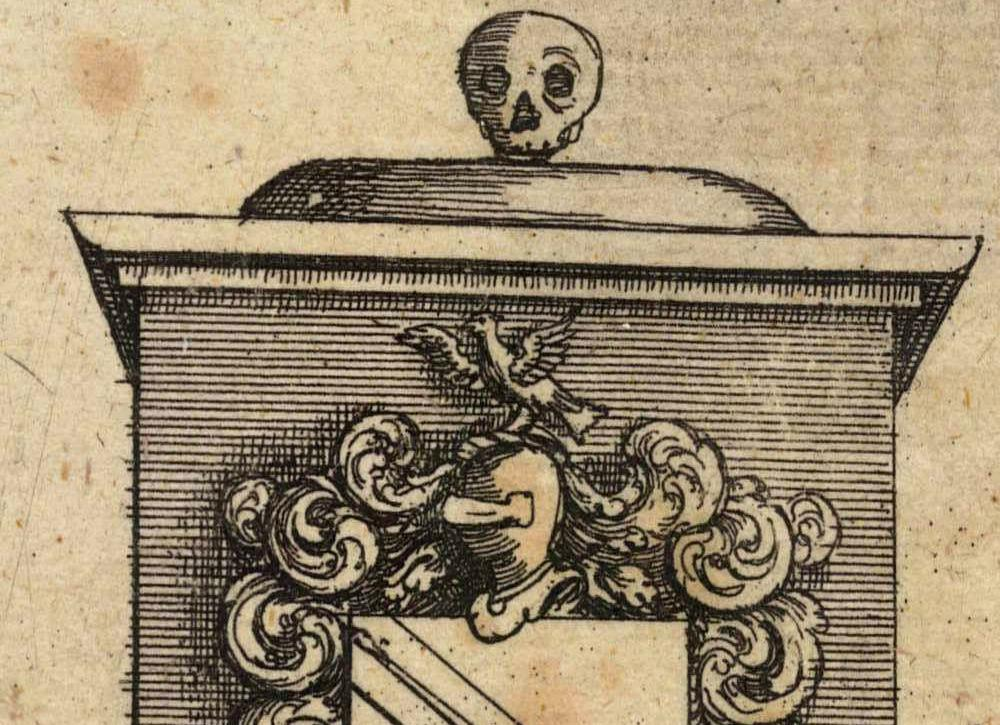
William Nugent's headstone, on the left, showing a bird on the helmet, and, on the right, an early illustration of Shakespeare's monument in Stratford upon Avon.

In 1978 Elizabeth Hickey wrote The Green Cockatrice which claimed that William Nugent was the real author of Shakespeare's works. She claimed he led a life which gave him insights into the kind of political, religious, military, legal and international diplomatic intrigues that populate Shakespeare's works.

For example, as noted above, he was imprisoned by the state for opposing the cess in Ireland in the 1570s, and he rebelled in 1581, losing a number of supporters to the hangman's noose and causing him to flee into exile, first into Scotland, then France and Italy – locations which are prominent in Shakespeare's works. During his exile he met most of the great European leaders, including the Pope, the kings of Spain, France and Scotland, and the Duke of Guise, and was involved in Europe-wide planning for an invasion of England. According to Brian Nugent, author of Shakespeare was Irish!, Nugent's 1590s court case accusing one of the senior Irish judges and the Lord Deputy of corruption demonstrates the great legal knowledge which comes across in Shakespeare's plays. This court case is also mentioned by the historians John Sherren Brewer and William Bullen. Nugent was always a great Catholic champion, a member of arguably the most prominent Catholic family in Ireland during the years of Shakespeare and he also launched a controversy in Dublin arguing the cause of Catholicism, which matches the new thinking about Shakespeare's religion.
