= Four Courts Press =

Irish academic publisher

- Four Courts Press logo
- Founded: 1970
- Headquarters location: Dublin, Ireland
- Distribution: Gill (Ireland); IPG (US)
- Key people: Martin Healy, managing director; Martin Fanning, publisher
- Publication types: Books
- Official website: www.fourcourtspress.ie

Four Courts Press is an independent Irish academic publishing house, with its office at Malpas Street, Dublin 8, Ireland.

Founded in 1970 by Michael Adams, who died in February 2009, its early publications were primarily theological, notably the English translation of the Navarre Bible. From 1992, it expanded into publishing peer-reviewed works in Celtic Studies, Medieval Studies and Ecclesiastical History, and then into modern history, art, literature and law. As of late 2024, Four Courts Press had around 800 titles in print and published around 35 new works each year.
