= Albert Pollard =

British historian (1869–1948)

Albert Pollard FBA
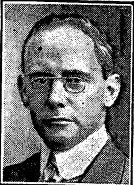
- Born: Albert Frederick Pollard; 16 December 1869; Ryde, Isle of Wight
- Died: 3 August 1948 (aged 78)
- Education: Jesus College, Oxford
- Movement: Liberal Party
- Children: Graham Pollard

Albert Frederick Pollard (16 December 1869 – 3 August 1948) was a British historian who specialised in the Tudor period. He was one of the founders of the Historical Association in 1906.

== Life and career ==
Pollard was born in Ryde on the Isle of Wight and educated at Portsmouth Grammar School, Felsted School and Jesus College, Oxford where he achieved a first-class honours in Modern History in 1891. He became assistant editor of and a contributor to the Dictionary of National Biography in 1893. His main academic post was that of Professor of Constitutional History at University College London which he held from 1903 to 1931. He was a member of the Royal Commission on Historical Manuscripts, and founder of the Historical Association, 1906. He edited History, 1916–1922, and the Bulletin of the Institute of Historical Research, 1923–1939. He published 500 articles in the Dictionary of National Biography, and many other books and papers concerning history. Later in his career, he was a major force in establishing history as an academic subject in Britain. The Evolution of Parliament, one of his most influential textbooks, was published in 1920.

== Controversy ==
Albert Pollard studied and wrote about the history of the Tudors from a political viewpoint. Key books include Henry VIII (1905) and The History of England from the Accession of Edward VI to the Death of Elizabeth, 1547–1603 (1910). In the latter he famously concluded that "Sterility was the conclusive note of Mary's reign"; this statement has been challenged by revisionist historians in recent years who have portrayed Mary in a much more favourable way. Some of Pollard's speculations are nowadays generally discredited by the revisionist school of history led by academics such as Christopher Haigh. For example, he put forward the thesis that English foreign policy from 1514 to 1529 was motivated by Thomas Wolsey's desire to become Pope. Pollard is identified with the Whiggish school of history, along with his student, J. E. Neale.

== Politics ==
Pollard was politically active for the Liberal Party and stood as Liberal candidate for the London University in the 1922, 1923 and 1924 General Elections.

== Personal life ==
In retirement Pollard lived at Milford-on-Sea in Hampshire. He was the father of the bibliographer and bookseller Graham Pollard and father-in-law to pioneering Communist and women's rights campaigner Kay Beauchamp. Another daughter, Margaret, married the classicist Harold Edgeworth Butler, and was the mother of political scientist Sir David Butler.

== Works ==
=== Contributions to the Dictionary of National Biography ===
Pollard was a prolific contributor to the DNB. Among many others:

- Pollard, Albert Frederick (1894). "Napier, Robert (d. 1615), judge". In Lee, Sidney (ed.). Dictionary of National Biography. Vol. 40. New York: MacMillan and Co. p. 73. OCLC 8544105.
- Pollard, Albert Frederick (1895). "O'Brien, Daniel, first Viscount Clare (1577?–1663)". In Lee, Sidney (ed.). Dictionary of National Biography. Vol. 41. New York: MacMillan and Co. pp. 310–311. OCLC 8544105.
- Pollard, Albert Frederick (1895). "O'Brien, Donough, Baron of Ibrickan and fourth Earl of Thomond (d. 1624)". In Lee, Sidney (ed.). Dictionary of National Biography. Vol. 41. New York: MacMillan and Co. pp. 312–314. OCLC 8544105.
- Pollard, Albert Frederick (1898). "Somerset, Edward (1601–1667)". In Lee, Sidney (ed.). Dictionary of National Biography. Vol. 53. London: Smith, Elder, & Co. p. 232. OCLC 8544105.
- Pollard, Albert Frederick (1898). "Talbot, Sir William (d. 1633)". In Lee, Sidney (ed.). Dictionary of National Biography. Vol. 55. London: Smith, Elder, & Co. pp. 338–339. OCLC 8544105.
- Pollard, Albert Frederick (1900). "Wilmot, Sir Charles, first Viscount of Athlone (d. 1633)". In Lee, Sidney (ed.). Dictionary of National Biography. Vol. 62 Williamson–Worden. New York: The Macmillan Company. pp. 59–61. OCLC 8544105.
- Pollard, Albert Frederick (1901). "Dillon, Sir Lucas (d. 1593)". In Lee, Sidney (ed.). Dictionary of National Biography Supplement. Vol. 2. New York: MacMillan and Co. pp. 132–133. OCLC 8544105.

=== Contributions to the Oxford Dictionary of National Biography ===
- Pollard, Albert Frederick; Kelsey, Sean (2004). "Talbot, William, first baronet (d.1634)". In Matthew, Colin; Harrison, Brian (eds.). Oxford Dictionary of National Biography. Vol. 53. New York: Oxford University Press. pp. 717–722. ISBN 0-19-861403-9.
