= F. Elrington Ball =

Irish author and legal historian

Francis Elrington Ball, known as F. Elrington Ball (1863–1928), was an Irish author and legal historian, best known for his work The Judges in Ireland 1221–1921 (1926).

== Life ==
A younger son of John Thomas Ball (1815 to 1898), the Lord Chancellor of Ireland from 1875 to 1880, and his wife Catherine Elrington, daughter of Charles Richard Elrington, Ball was unsuccessful in seeking election (as a Unionist) to Parliament at the 1900 general election in South Dublin, although the split in the Unionist vote did manage to unseat the more moderate Unionist sitting MP, Horace Plunkett. His father had represented Dublin University in Parliament from 1868 to 1875.

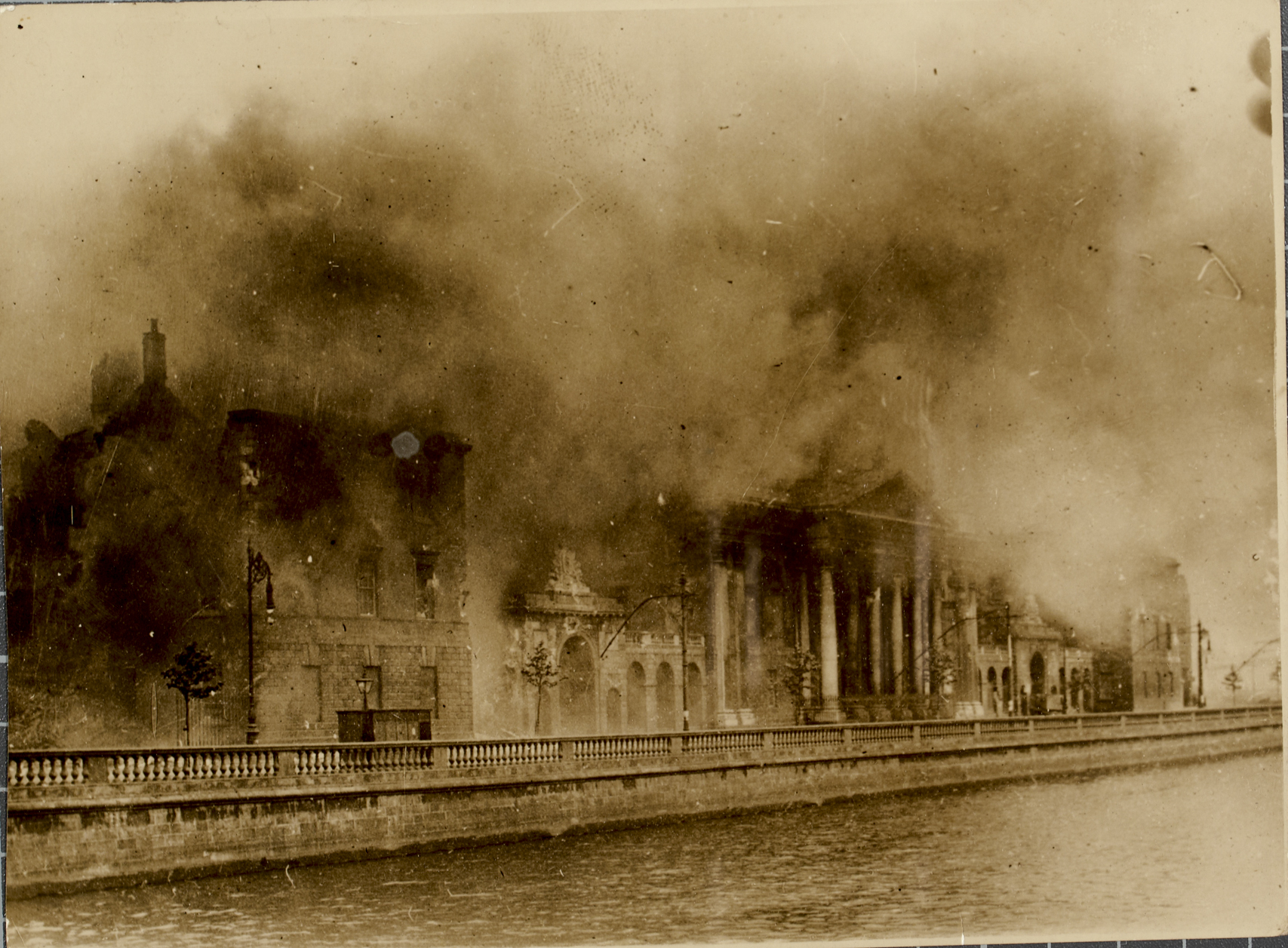
The Four Courts on fire during the Civil War

Ball is, however, best known for his scholarship, particularly for his work on Swift, the local history of Dublin and on the history of the judiciary in Ireland from 1221 to 1921. The destruction of the Four Courts in 1922, during the Civil War, and of the public records and legal archives it contained (especially those of the Irish Public Records Office) made Ball's prior research into the history of the Irish judiciary up to 1921 particularly valuable to later scholars. The review published in the Irish Law Times & Solicitors' Journal described it as "a truly marvellous condensation of judicial history involving the exhaustive study of a long period, the earlier part of which was hitherto obscure." The same review characterised Ball as "a writer of great care and accuracy, whose work is always characterised by minute and diligent research."

Ball was also a governor of the Blue Coat School, Oxmantown, Dublin. He lived for many years on Booterstown Avenue, Blackrock, Dublin. As a staunch Unionist, he was strongly opposed to the Irish War of Independence, and, in 1920, he moved to England, where he spent his last years, although at the time of his death he was visiting Dublin. He married Florence Hamilton, who died in 1913; they had no children.

== Works as author ==
- Ball, F Elrington; Hamilton, Everard (1895). The parish of Taney : a history of Dundrum, near Dublin, and its neighbourhood. Dublin: Hodges, Figgis & Co – via Internet Archive.
- Ball, F Elrington (1903). Some notes on the Irish judiciary ... 1660–1685. Cork: Cork Hist. and Arch. Soc.
- Ball, F Elrington (1904). Some notes on the judges of Ireland, 1739. Dublin: Roy. Soc. of Antiq. of Ireland.
- Ball, F Elrington (1907). The Vicinity of the International Exhibition Dublin: an historical sketch of the Pembroke township. Dublin: Alex. Thom & Co.
- Ball, F Elrington. A history of the county of Dublin: the people, parishes and antiquities from the earliest times to the close of the eighteenth century. Dublin: Alexander Thom.
  - Part 1 (1902) Monkstown, Kill-of-the-Grange, Dalkey, Killiney, Tully, Stillorgan, and Kilmacud.
  - Part 2 (1903) Donnybrook, Booterstown, St. Bartholomew, St. Mark, Taney, St. Peter, and Rathfarnham.
  - Part 3 (1905) Tallaght, Cruagh, Whitechurch, Kilgobbin, Kiltiernan, Rathmichael, Old Connaught, Saggart, Rathcoole, and Newcastle.
  - Part 4 (1906) Clonsilla, Leixlip, Lucan, Aderrig, Kilmactalway, Kilbride, Kilmahuddrick, Esker, Palmerston, Ballyfermot, Clondalkin, Drimnagh, Crumlin, St. Catherine, St. Nicholas Without, St. James, St. Jude, and Chapelizod, as well as within the Phoenix Park.
  - Part 5 (1917) Howth and its owners.
  - Part 6 (1920) Castleknock, Mulhuddart, Cloghran, Ward, St. Margaret, Finglas, Glasnevin, Grangegorman, St. George, and Clonturk.
- Ball, F Elrington (1926). The Judges in Ireland 1221–1921 2 vols. London: John Murray. ISBN 978-1-58477-428-0.
- Ball, F Elrington (1929). Swift's verse: an essay. London: John Murray. ISBN 0-8482-0170-1.

== Works as editor ==
- Falkiner, Caesar Litton (1909). F. Elrington Ball (ed.). Essays relating to Ireland: biographical, historical and topographical; with a memoir of the author by Edward Dowden. London: Longmans, Green, & Co. ISBN 0-8046-0777-X.
- Swift, Jonathan (1910). F. Elrington Ball (ed.). The Correspondence of Jonathan Swift, Vol. 1 (1690–1712). London: G. Bell & Sons.
- Swift, Jonathan (1911). —— (ed.). The Correspondence of Jonathan Swift, Vol. 2 (1713–1717). London: G. Bell & Sons.
- Butler, James (1st duke of Ormonde) (1911). Caesar Litton Falkiner; —— (eds.). Calendar of the manuscripts of the Marquess of Ormonde, K. P., preserved at Kilkenny castle. New series Vol 6. London: HMSO. Cd. 5288.
- Swift, Jonathan (1912). —— (ed.). The Correspondence of Jonathan Swift, Vol. 1 (1718–1727). London: G. Bell & Sons.
- Butler, James (1st duke of Ormonde) (1912). —— (ed.). Calendar of the manuscripts of the Marquess of Ormonde, K. P., preserved at Kilkenny castle. New series Vol 7. London: HMSO. Cd. 6255.
- Swift, Jonathan (1913). —— (ed.). The Correspondence of Jonathan Swift, Vol. 4 (1727–1733). London: G. Bell & Sons.
- Swift, Jonathan (1913). —— (ed.). The Correspondence of Jonathan Swift, Vol. 5 (1733–1737). London: G. Bell & Sons.
- Swift, Jonathan (1914). —— (ed.). The Correspondence of Jonathan Swift, Vol. 6 (1737–1744). London: G. Bell & Sons.
- Butler, James (2nd duke of Ormonde) (1920). —— (ed.). Calendar of the manuscripts of the Marquess of Ormonde, K. P., preserved at Kilkenny castle. New series Vol 8. London: HMSO. Cmd. 284.
