= Newtown Abbey =

Ruined medieval monastery, County Meath, Ireland

- Mainistir an Bhaile Nua
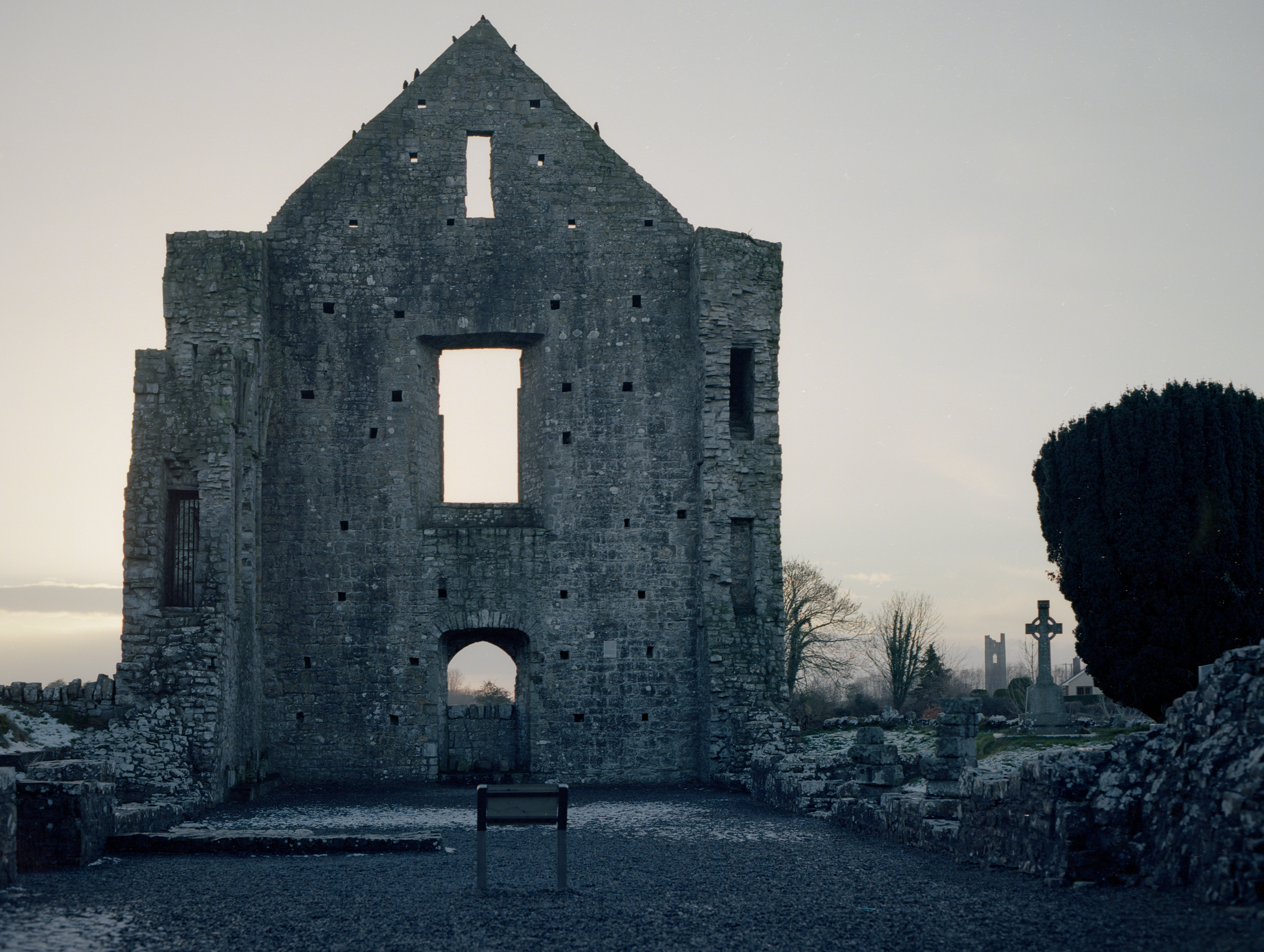
- West wall of the abbey church

- Location within Ireland
- Interactive map of Newtown Abbey

Monastery information
- Other names: Abbey of St Peter and St Paul
- Order: Canons Regular
- Established: c. 1206
- Disestablished: 1537
- Diocese: Meath

People
- Founder: Simon Rochfort

Architecture
- Status: Inactive
- Heritage designation: National Monument
- Style: Norman

Site
- Location: Newtown, Trim, County Meath
- Coordinates: 53.555252°N 6.773247°W
- Public access: yes

Newtown Abbey is a medieval monastery and National Monument located in Trim, County Meath, Ireland.

== Location ==
Newtown Abbey is located about 1.2 km (¾ mile) east of Trim town centre, on the north bank of the Boyne.

== History ==
The Abbey was founded by Simon Rochfort, Bishop of Meath, for Canons Regular ("Augustinians") of the Order of St. Victor about 1206, and was dedicated to Saint Peter and Saint Paul.

A synod was held at Newtown in 1216, which turned the sees of the churches of Trim, Kells, Slane, Skryne, and Dunshaughlin into rural deaneries.

In 1307, Richard Sweetman, the prior, was accused of murdering Robert Mody, one of the canons, and of assisting his brother, William Sweetman, to kill another canon. The prior gave Hugh de Lacie and John le Blounde, of Rathregan, as bail for his appearance at the next assizes. There is no record of the result of the trial.

William Shirwood, Bishop of Meath, was interred at Newtown Abbey in 1482.

The Abbey was suppressed in the Dissolution of the Monasteries in 1537.

== Buildings ==
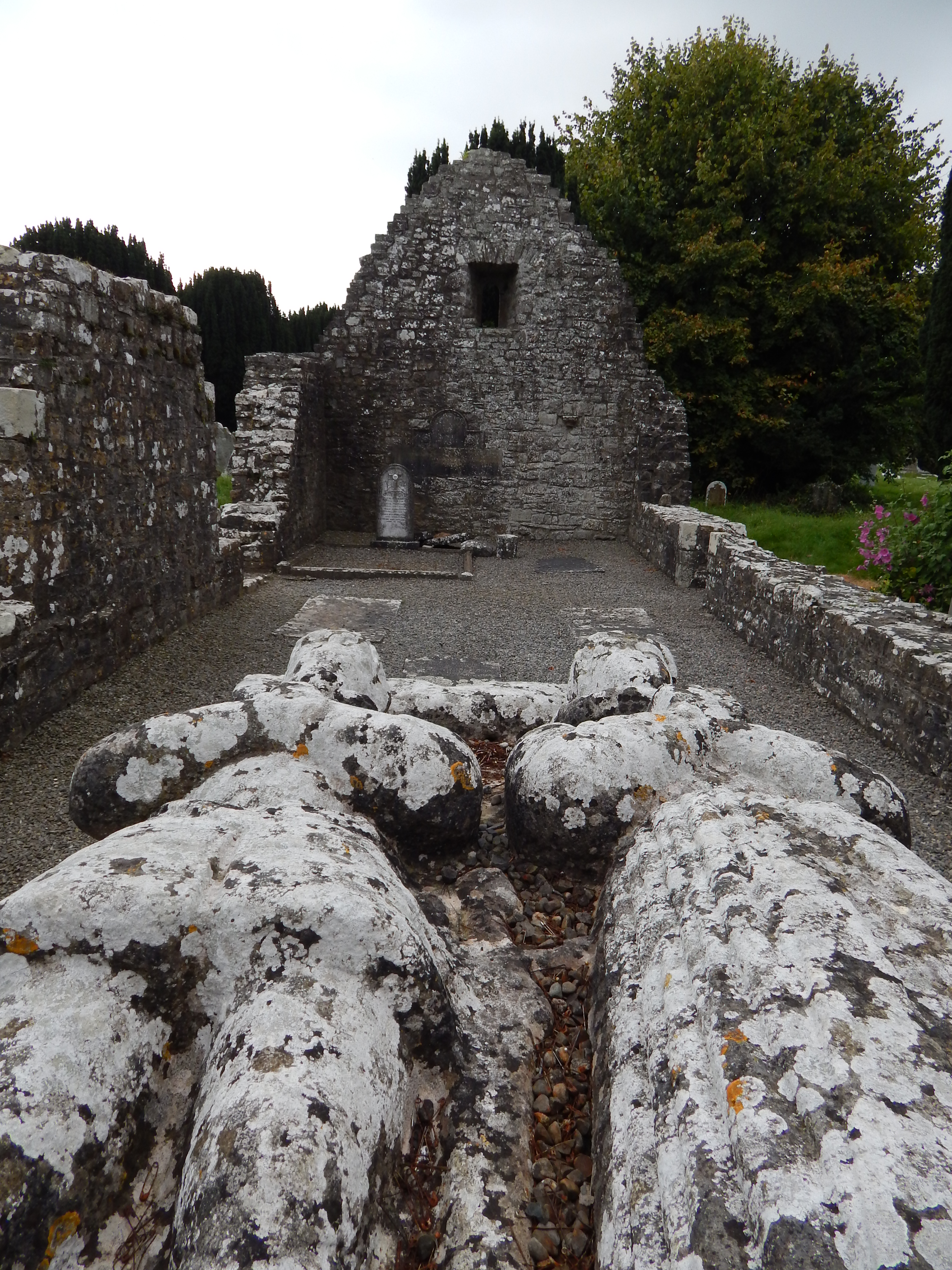
The "jealous man and woman", believed to be Sir Lucas Dillon (died 1592) and his first wife Janet Bathe, their effigies covered in lichens.

The main building is the Church of St Peter and St Paul (sometimes called a cathedral). The abbey church features lancet windows, with Norman-style sedilia to the right of the altar, and a double piscina for washing communion vessels.

A smaller church in the east of the monastery is the parish church of Newtown Clonbun. This is the burial site of Lucas Dillon (1530 – 1592), Attorney General for Ireland and Chief Baron of the Irish Exchequer, and his first wife Jane Bathe. Their tomb effigies are separated by a sword of state, and so they gained the local nickname of the "jealous man and woman".
