= Richard Netterville =

Irish lawyer and politician

Richard Netterville (c. 1540–1607) was an Irish barrister and politician of the Elizabethan era. He was noted for his willingness to oppose the Crown, especially on its taxation policies, and as a result, he was imprisoned several times.

== Background ==
He was born in Dowth in County Meath, second son of Luke Netterville, judge of the Court of King's Bench (Ireland) and Margaret, daughter of Sir Thomas Luttrell, Chief Justice of the Irish Common Pleas. The Netterville family were long-established landowners in County Meath, and are recorded in Ireland from before 1280. His father died in 1560. As he was the son and grandson of judges, and a younger son with his livelihood to earn, it was an obvious career choice for Richard to practice at the Irish Bar. He was at the Inns of Court in London in 1561–62, where he was one of a group of Irish law students who compiled a book on the misgovernment of the Pale. He had returned to Ireland by 1564 to practice law.

== Cess controversy ==
The cess, a tax levied for the upkeep of the military garrisons of the Pale (those four counties which were under secure Crown control), was always unpopular with the Anglo-Irish gentry on whom it was levied, and the book to which Richard had contributed when he was a law student in the early 1560s included an attack on it. Matters came to a head in 1576 over the plans of the Lord Deputy of Ireland, Sir Henry Sidney, to reform and extend the cess. Richard was one of three barristers chosen to go to London to protest against what the gentry argued would be the ruinous cost of the plans, the others being Henry Burnell and the former Attorney General for Ireland, Barnaby Skurloke. The mission turned out badly: Elizabeth was angered by their attack on the royal prerogative, and imprisoned them in the Fleet Prison. In Netterville's case, her attitude was probably influenced by Sidney's deep dislike of him. The Lord Deputy wrote to the Queen-

Netterville is the younger son of a mean family and (his father) second justice of one of the benches, born to nothing and yet only by your Majesty's bounty liveth in better countenance than his father ever did or his elder brother doth; and notwithstanding that all he hath, he holdeth of your Highness in effect, he is (your sacred Majesty not offended with so bad a term as his lewdness deserveth) as seditious a varlet and as great an impugner of English Government as any this land beareth and calls for severe dealing with.

The Queen, in the end, dealt leniently enough with the three lawyers: as opposition mounted to Sidney's plans, his position in the Irish government weakened accordingly. The lawyers, having made an abject apology, were released from the Fleet and soon pardoned.

In the political troubles of the early 1580s, especially the rebellions of William Nugent and James Eustace, 3rd Viscount Baltinglass, the Nettervilles were deeply involved, and two of Richard's brothers were killed fighting on the rebels' side. This enhanced Richard's standing with the Roman Catholic gentry, but no doubt deepened the Crown's suspicion of him. He was frequently accused of harbouring Roman Catholic priests, but no charges were ever brought against him.

== Parliament of 1585 ==
Netterville's imprisonment and apology did not lessen his willingness to oppose the authority of the Lord Deputy, and he proceeded to clash with Sidney's successor Sir John Perrot. Perrot had drawn up an ambitious programme of law reform for the 1585 Irish Parliament; Netterville, who was elected to the Irish House of Commons as member for County Dublin, was one of the leaders of the opposition and thwarted the Deputy at every opportunity. To Perrot's fury, they even demanded to see his accounts; he complained-

It angers me to make this bibble-babble account, fitter to be told to boys than any that have wit or judgment, and I think foul scorn they should put me to it.

He retaliated by imprisoning Nettterville and some of his colleagues, but failed to get his reforms through Parliament.

== Last controversies ==
In 1606, Netterville, despite his advanced age, was in trouble with the authorities yet again. Led by Patrick Barnewall, the Roman Catholic gentry of the Pale protested against the imposition of fines on those who did not attend a Church of Ireland service on Sunday, and against and the use of the Court of Castle Chamber (the Irish equivalent of Star Chamber) to enforce religious conformity. Several of them were committed to prison as a result. Netterville was apparently spared imprisonment, due to his age. He was placed under house arrest, where he stubbornly continued to have Mass celebrated; according to a family tradition, he was separated from the priest by a curtain, so that if questioned he might swear on oath that he had not seen Mass being celebrated. He died on 5 September 1607 and was buried at Donabate.

== Family ==
He had married Alison (or Alice) Plunket, daughter of the Lord Chief Justice of Ireland, Sir John Plunket and his second wife Catherine Luttrell, but had no children. His estate passed to his nephew Nicholas Netterville, 1st Viscount Netterville
