= Nicholas Netterville =

Nicholas Netterville may refer to:

- Nicholas Netterville, 1st Viscount Netterville
- Nicholas Netterville, 5th Viscount Netterville
