= Nicholas de Netterville =

Nicholas de Netterville (died after 1309) was a Crown official and judge in Ireland in the late thirteenth and early fourteenth centuries. He was the first notable member of a prominent landowning family in County Meath, who were based mainly at Dowth. His descendants in the seventeenth century acquired the title Viscount Netterville. The family also produced at least two more senior judges in the sixteenth century, Thomas Netterville and Luke Netterville.

Little is known of his early years. He was probably the son of Luke Netterville and Catherine Fleming, daughter of John Fleming, ancestor of the Fleming family who held the title Baron Slane. He is first heard of in about 1280 as a knight in the household of Theobald de Verdun, 2nd Baron Verdun, who had inherited half of the Lordship of Meath from his grandmother Margery de Lacy, co-heiress of the de Lacy family. Nicholas was exempted at the time from acting as a juror or bailiff on account of "the war in Ireland"; ("war" is something of an exaggeration, but there had undoubtedly been serious disturbances in the previous two years in Meath and adjoining parts of Leinster). He served two terms as High Sheriff of County Louth, in 1281-4 and 1287. He was Constable of Athlone Castle in 1295. He was employed for a time in the Exchequer of Ireland, and in 1299 rendered an account of the Crown's profits for County Dublin. On an unspecified date, he acknowledged a debt of 20 silver marks to Sir John Mytheford. He was a justice of the Court of Common Pleas (Ireland) 1301-1309.

He married Lady Joan FitzGerald, daughter of John FitzGerald, 1st Earl of Kildare and Blanche de la Roche, daughter of John Roche, Lord Fermoy. The marriage is evidence of his rising social status, as the FitzGeralds were well on their way to becoming the dominant Anglo-Irish magnate family in the East of Ireland, and had been granted most of County Kildare after the de Vesci family died out. They had four sons, Luke, James, Thomas and William. Luke, who married Anne Bellew of Bellewstown, was the ancestor of the Viscounts Netterville.

In 1306, the four brothers complained that they were the victims of a serious assault near their father's house at Kennagh in County Meath by a gang led by John le Petyt, whose name appears several times in court records as a local malefactor. The assault appears to be related to the gang's theft of sixty cattle from Nicholas's lands at Dowth. A Commission of Oyer and Terminer, whose members included Sir Richard de Exeter and Thomas de Snyterby, Netterville's colleagues in the Common Pleas, was set up to deal with the matter. It found le Petyt and his fellows guilty and ordered them to pay heavy damages.

== Sources ==
- Ball, F. Elrington The Judges in Ireland 1221-1921 London John Murray 1926
- Calendar of Justiciary Rolls 1305-7
- Debrett's Peerage of England London 1790 Vol. 3
- Otway-Ruthven, A.J. History of Medieval Ireland Barnes and Noble reissue New York 1993
- Stephen, Leslie, ed. (1889). "Fitzthomas, John" . Dictionary of National Biography. Vol. 19. London: Smith, Elder & Co.
