= Luke Netterville =

Irish judge

Luke (Lucas) Netterville (c. 1510–1560) was a sixteenth-century Irish judge. He was father of the statesman Richard Netterville and grandfather of the 1st Viscount Netterville.

He was born in County Meath, son of John Netterville of Dowth and Alison St Lawrence, daughter of Nicholas St Lawrence, 4th Baron Howth and his first wife Genet Plunkett. His family had a long association with the law: the first notable member of the family in Ireland was Sir Nicholas de Netterville, who served twice as High Sheriff of County Louth in the 1280s, and was appointed a judge of the Court of Common Pleas (Ireland) in 1301. John's cousin and brother-in-law Thomas Netterville, who was clearly older than Luke (he died in 1528), and who married Alison's sister Elizabeth St. Lawrence, was a judge of the Court of King's Bench (Ireland). After John's death, his widow Alison remarried yet another High Court judge, Sir Patrick White and had further issue, including the influential writer and political reformer Rowland White.

In 1555 Netterville was involved in litigation with yet another High Court judge, Walter Kerdiff, over the Dowth property. In 1558 he served on a commission to inquire into the lands held by Gerald FitzGerald, 11th Earl of Kildare. The following year he was appointed second justice of the Court of King's Bench. In 1560 he sat on a commission to inquire into martial law in Meath, together with his colleague Richard Dillon, but he died later the same year.

Some years after his death the Lord Deputy of Ireland, Sir Henry Sidney, described Luke in disparaging terms as a man who was "but second justice of one of the Benches...... of mean family.......born to nothing." This attack was in the course of an attempt to damage the career of Luke's son Richard, who was one of Sidney's bitterest enemies, and there is no reason to think that his low opinion of Luke was widely shared. Nor would the grandson of Baron Howth be regarded by most people as being of "mean family": wealthy and well-connected English families were happy to marry into the St. Lawrence dynasty, while in the late thirteenth century a Netterville had married a daughter of the Earl of Kildare, and Luke was also descended from Baron Killeen and Baron Slane.

Luke married Margaret Luttrell, daughter of Sir Thomas Luttrell, Chief Justice of the Irish Common Pleas, and Elizabeth Bathe, and had two sons:

- John (died 1601) father of Nicholas Netterville, 1st Viscount Netterville
- Richard (died 1607), who was a leading politician and barrister.

== Ancestry ==
2. John Netterville
1. Luke Netterville
24. Christopher St Lawrence, 2nd Baron Howth
12. Robert St Lawrence, 3rd Baron Howth
6. Nicholas St Lawrence, 4th Baron Howth
26. Nicholas White
13. Alice White
3. Alison St Lawrence
