= Robert Shilyngford =

Irish politician

Robert Shilyngford, or Shillenford (died c. 1553) was Mayor of Dublin from 1534 to 1535. Apart from his tenure in this office, he is mainly remembered as the first of the six husbands of Jenet Sarsfield.

Jenet was only about seven when her future husband was elected Mayor of Dublin, so their marriage probably did not take place until the mid-1540s. The couple had one daughter, Katherine, who was Jenet's only surviving child. Katherine married Thomas Talbot of Dardistown Castle, County Meath, and had issue, including Jenet, who married Robert Barnewall, 7th Baron Trimlestown.

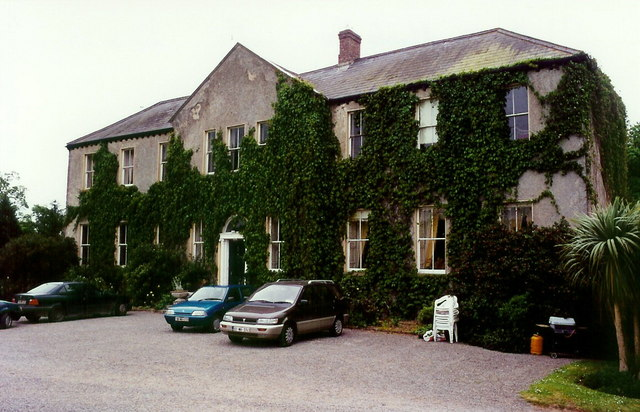
Dardistown Castle, the home of Robert's daughter, Katherine Talbot, present day

Robert died before 1554, when Jenet remarried, to James Luttrell. She had six husbands in all, including Robert Plunkett, 5th Baron of Dunsany and the eminent judges Sir Thomas Cusack and Sir John Plunket.

Although Shilyngford was the father of her only surviving child, Jenet does not seem to have attached much importance to his memory, preferring in later life to be known as Lady Dunsany, under which title she was buried at Moorchurch, near Julianstown, County Meath, in her own tomb, separately from any of her husbands.

Civic offices
Preceded by Walter FitzSimon	Mayor of Dublin; 1534–1535	Succeeded by Thomas Stephens
