= Thomas Netterville =

Irish judge (died 1528)

Thomas Netterville (died 1528) was an Irish judge in the reign of Henry VIII.

== Life ==
He was born at Dowth in County Meath, son of John Netterville and a daughter of Christopher Barnewall, 2nd Baron Trimlestown, and Elizabeth Plunkett. The Nettervilles were an old Anglo-Irish family which had already produced one leading judge, Nicholas de Netterville, who like Thomas sat in the Common Pleas (1301-9). Luke Netterville (died 1560), another Irish judge of the era, was Thomas's younger cousin and brother-in-law (they married sisters of the St Lawrence family) and was the ancestor of Viscount Netterville.

Thomas was studying law at the Inner Temple in 1507. He was Chief Justice of the Liberty of Kildare in 1518. He became a judge of the Court of Common Pleas (Ireland) in 1521, and probably died in office in 1528.

He married Elizabeth, daughter of Nicholas St Lawrence, 4th Baron Howth and his first wife Genet Plunkett; they had no children.

== Sources ==
- Ball, F. Elrington The Judges in Ireland 1221-1921 London John Murray 1926
- Kenny, Colum King's Inns and the Kingdom of Ireland Dublin Irish Academic Press 1992
- Lodge, John Peerage of Ireland London William Johnston 1754 Vol. IV
