= St. Margaret's, County Dublin =

Settlement area, townland and civil parish in Ireland

Saint Margaret's Irish: Teampall Mhaighréide
- Civil parish
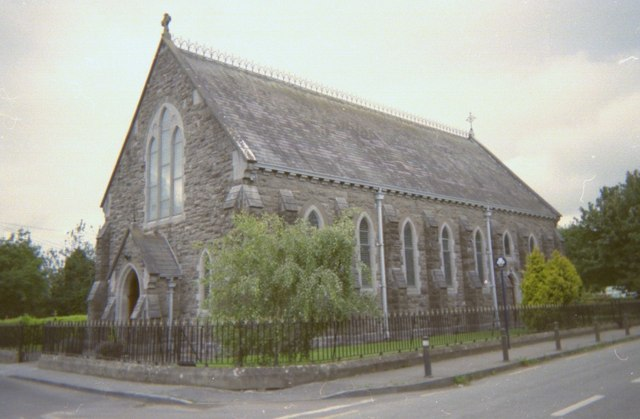
- St Margaret's Roman Catholic church

- Location in Dublin
- Coordinates: 53.4307°N 6.3009°W
- Country: Ireland
- Province: Leinster
- County: County Dublin
- Local government area: Fingal
- Irish grid reference: O129436

Saint Margaret's or St. Margaret's (Irish: Teampall Mhaighréide) is a civil parish and townland in the historical barony of Coolock in County Dublin, Ireland. Rivermeade, a housing estate of 175 homes which is treated as a separate census town, is located between Saint Margaret's and the Ward River. Dublin Airport is also nearby.

== History ==
One of the earliest documented references to St. Margaret's dates to 1182, when Pope Lucius III reportedly confirmed "the town of St. Margarets" to the Archbishop of Dublin. Other evidence of ancient settlement in the area includes a fulacht fiadh site, holy well, and an early 18th century church and graveyard. 16th-century records of St. Margaret's Chapel at Dunsoghly, also called Dovemachenor or Donoughmore, indicate that a church existed in the area from at least 1275 AD.

Also nearby is the 15th century Dunsoghly Castle, the one-time residence of John Plunket, who was Lord Chief Justice of Ireland from 1559 until his death in 1582. The graveyard and well at St. Margaret's are also historically associated with the Plunket family and it was reputedly a member of this family who had "St. Margaret's Spa Well [...] walled in so as to form a bath 6 feet long by 3 feet wide".

== Geography ==
There are 14 townlands within Saint Margaret's civil parish, including Barberstown, Harristown, Newtown, Sandyhill, Shanganhill, and Saint Margaret's. A number of these townlands, such as Shanganhill, overlap with the grounds of Dublin Airport.

Rivermeade
Year	Pop.	±%
1991	660	—
1996	621	−5.9%
2002	558	−10.1%
2006	615	+10.2%
2011	542	−11.9%
2016	530	−2.2%
2022	521	−1.7%

Rivermeade, a housing development of 175 homes south of the Ward River, is located in the area. Rivermeade is treated as a census town and had a population of 521 people as of the 2022 census. It is served by Dublin Bus route L89.

In 2018, the local authority, Fingal County Council, published a statutory Local Area Plan (LAP) covering the area. The LAP envisaged making Rivermeade, and St. Margaret's in general, a "more viable community" and providing a base for local services, with allowance for the addition of up to 275 houses, a commercial centre and a civic space.

== Amenities ==
Local national (primary) schools include St. Margaret's National School (with an enrollment of approximately 90 pupils), and Mary Queen of Ireland National School in Rivermeade (which opened in 1981).

The local Catholic church, which is dedicated to Saint Margaret, is a chapel of ease in Finglas parish in the Archdiocese of Dublin. This 19th-century church is included in the Record of Protected Structures maintained by Fingal County Council.

== Sport ==
Sports clubs in the area include St Margaret's GAA club (which was founded in 1908) and St. Margaret's Golf Club. As of 2018, Rivermeade F.C. was fielding association football (soccer) teams in the Athletic Union League.
