= John Netterville, 2nd Viscount Netterville =

John Netterville, 2nd Viscount Netterville (c.1603-1659) was an Irish peer, soldier and statesman of the seventeenth century. He was noted for his devout Roman Catholic beliefs and his strong support for the Irish Catholic political cause; this led him during the Irish Rebellion of 1641 and the ensuing Civil Wars to play a double game, offering support to both the Crown and the rebels, with the result that no party to the conflict fully trusted him. He was charged with treason by the Government of Charles I and his estates were forfeited by Oliver Cromwell. He died in his English exile of natural causes.

== Background and early career ==
He was born at Dowth in Meath, eldest son of Nicholas Netterville, 1st Viscount Netterville and his first wife Eleanor Bathe, daughter of Sir John Bathe of Drumcondra, Dublin. His father was a favourite of James I who ennobled him in 1622 "in consideration of his good qualities". In time Nicholas like his son was to be accused of disloyalty to the English Crown. In both cases, their real aim seems to have been to restore the Roman Catholic faith (two of Nicholas' younger sons were Jesuits).

In 1623 John married Lady Elizabeth Weston, daughter of Richard Weston, 1st Earl of Portland, the future Lord Treasurer, and his first wife Elizabeth Pinchion. The marriage gave him influence at the English Court and a useful ally in promoting toleration of Catholics, since Portland himself was a convert to the Catholic faith.

In November 1632, shortly after the appointment of Thomas Wentworth, 1st Earl of Strafford as Lord Deputy of Ireland, John and other prominent Catholics petitioned him not to enforce the Penal Laws.

== Rebellion and Civil War ==
On the outbreak of the Irish Rebellion of 1641, John, with a troop of 100 men was sent to assist Viscount Moore in holding Drogheda, but he was suspected of inciting the population to join the rebellion, and was forced to withdraw to his own house. For the next few months he and his father both followed a devious course, professing loyalty to the Crown while offering covert support to the rebels. His next brother Luke, disdaining any pretence of loyalty, was killed fighting for the rebels. In February 1642 the Irish House of Commons ordered that John be removed from command of his troops. John, wishing to reach an accommodation with his opponents, approached the Marquess of Ormonde, who arrested him and sent him to Dublin. The Crown's legal advice was that a clear case for treason had been made out against John, but that no Meath jury would convict him, so that if possible he should be tried in Dublin. His trial finally opened in February 1643, but the King and Ormonde now hoped for his support; the trial did not proceed and he was released in April.

Immediately after his release, he joined the army of the Irish Confederacy under Thomas Preston. He was still campaigning in 1650, by which time he had only about six men left.

== Last years and death ==
Under the Act for the Settlement of Ireland 1652 John and his father were both exempted from pardon for their lives and estates, but do not seem to have suffered any actual ill-treatment. John moved to England where his wife Elizabeth Weston argued successfully that as an English subject she was entitled to enjoy part of the Netterville property. There seems to have been enough for John to live on even after his wife's death in 1656 although he was said to be living in considerable poverty. He succeeded to the title in 1654, but was still in England when he died in September 1659. He was buried beside his wife in St Giles in the Fields.

== Family ==
He and Elizabeth had eleven children:

- Nicholas Netterville, 3rd Viscount Netterville
- Jerome, who became a priest
- James, an army officer
- Richard
- Lucas
- Patrick
- Robert
- Mary, who married Henry Barnewall, 2nd Viscount Barnewall
- Margaret, who married William Archbold
- Frances
- Eleanor

Peerage of Ireland
Preceded by Nicholas Netterville	Viscount Netterville; 1654–1659	Succeeded by Nicholas Netterville
