= Thomas Plunket (judge, died 1519) =

Irish landowner and judge

Sir Thomas Plunket (c.1440–1519) was a wealthy Irish landowner, lawyer and judge in fifteenth-century and early sixteenth-century Ireland. He held office as Chief Baron of the Irish Exchequer and Chief Justice of the Irish Common Pleas. After the change of the English royal family in 1485, his loyalty to the new Tudor dynasty was deeply suspect, and he was involved in two attempts to put a pretender on the English throne. On each occasion he was disgraced, fined and removed from office; yet he had sufficient political influence to ensure his return to favour and high office.

He is principally remembered as the builder of the impressive family residence, Dunsoghly Castle, Finglas, which still exists. He should not be confused with his uncle, Sir Thomas Fitz-Christopher Plunket.

== Family ==
He was born in County Meath, the only son of Sir Robert Plunket, who served briefly as Lord Chief Justice of Ireland in 1447, and his wife Genet Finglas. Sir Robert was the fourth of the seven sons of Sir Christopher Plunket, who married the Cusack heiress, and was created 1st Baron Killeen in about 1426. Thomas was "bred to the law": his uncle Thomas was also Lord Chief Justice, and his extended family produced six senior judges over four generations.

== Career ==
By 1480 Thomas had become a very wealthy man. He held extensive lands in County Dublin at Castleknock, Cabra and Finglas. It has been suggested that his father began the building of the main family residence, Dunsoghly Castle, at Finglas, but the weight of the evidence points to Thomas as the builder. Dunsoghly today is one of the few fifteenth-century Irish castles to remain intact, and the only one whose original timber roof survives.

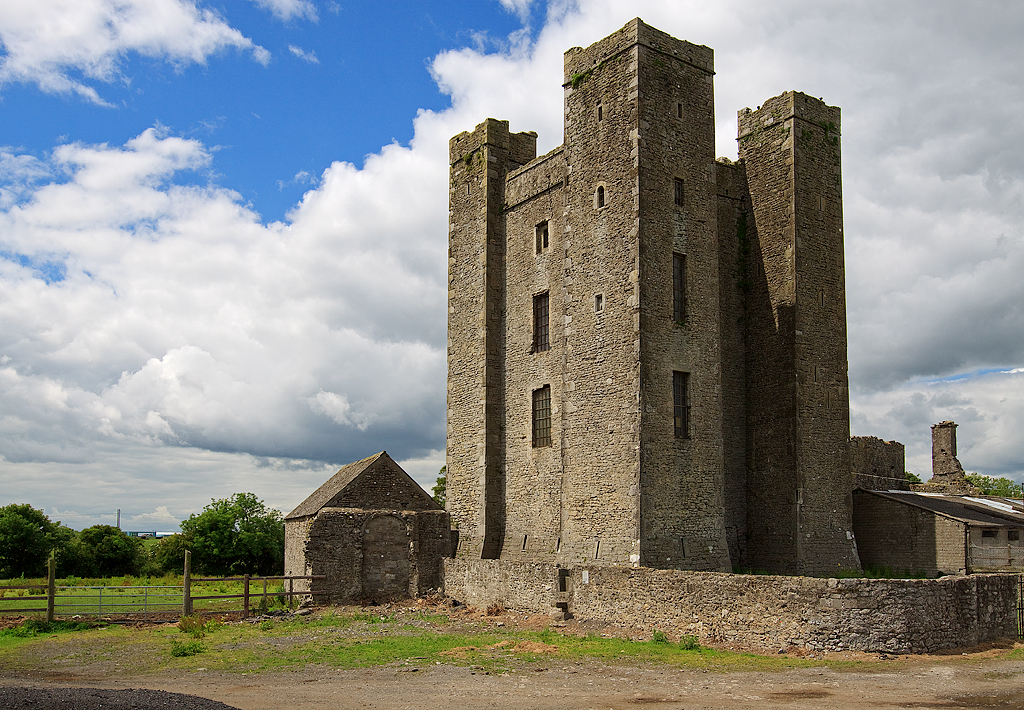
Dunsoghly Castle

He was appointed Chief Baron of the Exchequer in 1480 and Chief Justice of the Common Pleas two years later.

== Lambert Simnel ==
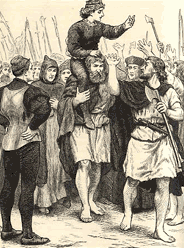
Lambert Simnel in Ireland

In 1487 a priest called Richard Simon (or Symonds) appeared in Ireland accompanied by a young boy called Lambert Simnel, who due to their striking physical resemblance was able to impersonate Edward Plantagenet, 17th Earl of Warwick. As the nephew and direct male heir of the last two Yorkist Kings, the real Earl of Warwick (who was actually a prisoner in the Tower of London), had a much stronger claim to the English Crown than did Henry VII, who had only a remote claim to the Crown through his mother as the heir in the female line of John of Gaunt.

The Anglo-Irish nobility were overwhelmingly Yorkist in sympathy, and they also saw the conflict as a chance to strengthen their own power at the Crown's expense. Gerald FitzGerald, 8th Earl of Kildare, the dominant magnate in Ireland, declared for Simnel, who was crowned King Edward VI in Christ Church Cathedral, Dublin. Ball remarks that most of the Irish judiciary followed Kildare "like sheep"; but Plunket played an active role in rallying support for Simnel, and as a result, in his later years he was regarded by the English Crown with particular mistrust.

Simnel, with about 4500 Irish troops, invaded England, but his army was crushed by the royal army at the Battle of Stoke Field in June 1487. Henry VII was merciful in victory: Simnel was taken into the royal household as a kitchen boy, and later promoted to the more prestigious post of falconer, while Kildare and most of his fellow nobles were given a royal pardon.

== Aftermath of the Simnel rebellion ==
The general pardon did not extend to Plunket, or to Sir James Keating, Prior of the Order of St John of Jerusalem at Kilmainham, since these two men, for no very clear reason, were regarded as "the prime instigators" of the rebellion, rather than the Earl of Kildare. Sir Richard Edgcumbe, who was sent to Ireland in 1488 to accept the submission of the Irish nobles, refused, despite Kildare's pleas on their behalf, to take oaths of homage or fealty from Plunket or Keating, "who were specially noted among the other chief causes of the Rebellion". Eventually, with great reluctance, Edgcumbe was persuaded to pardon Plunket, but he refused to show clemency to Keating, who was removed from office and died in poverty in about 1491. Plunket retained office, but he was never fully trusted again, with good reason as it turned out.

== Perkin Warbeck ==
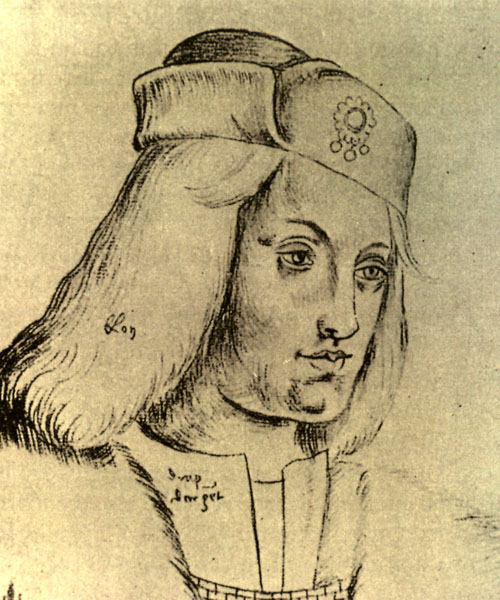
Perkin Warbeck

In 1491 a second pretender to the English Crown, Perkin Warbeck, appeared in Ireland: he claimed to be Richard of Shrewsbury, younger son of King Edward IV of England. He received far less support than Simnel, (Kildare, prudently, refused to back him) but a small rising took place in which Plunket was implicated. He was removed from office, fined for "diverse seditions and transgressions", and subject to confiscation of his goods, including some extremely valuable silver plate, but he was not imprisoned. His removal was probably part of a general purge of Kildare's supporters among the Irish judiciary: although Kildare had not made the mistake of supporting Warbeck, his loyalty was still deeply suspect. Warbeck reappeared in Ireland in 1495, but it is not known if Plunket had any further dealings with him.

== Last years ==
In 1498, rather surprisingly, Plunket regained office as Chief Justice, probably at the request of Kildare, who had now been restored to favour. In his last years on the Bench, he held office jointly with Richard Delahide, who had married his granddaughter Jenet. He retired in 1515 and died in 1519.

An inventory of his possessions, taken in connection with the fine imposed on him in 1491, and which refers among many other items to "gilt salt cellars" and "coconut cups", confirms his great wealth. He was a noted benefactor of Christ Church Cathedral, presenting it with gifts of gold, silver and vestments, and assigning to the Cathedral Chapter his lands at Cabra, Dublin, subject to a life interest for himself and his second wife Helen.

== Marriage and Children ==
He married firstly Janet Finglas, and secondly Helen Strangwick; neither marriage can be dated. He had two children:

- Christopher, who inherited Dunsoghly Castle; he had three sons, of whom the eldest was Sir John Plunket, the third member of his family to be Lord Chief Justice of Ireland, and at least two daughters: Jenet, who married Chief Justice Delahide, and Margaret who married John Garvey, Archbishop of Armagh and Primate of Ireland.
- Elizabeth, who married Edmund Barnewall of Crickstown and had issue, including Jenet (or Elizabeth), who married Sir Robert Dillon (died 1580), Chief Justice of the Irish Common Pleas.
