= Chamber tomb =

Communal burial place

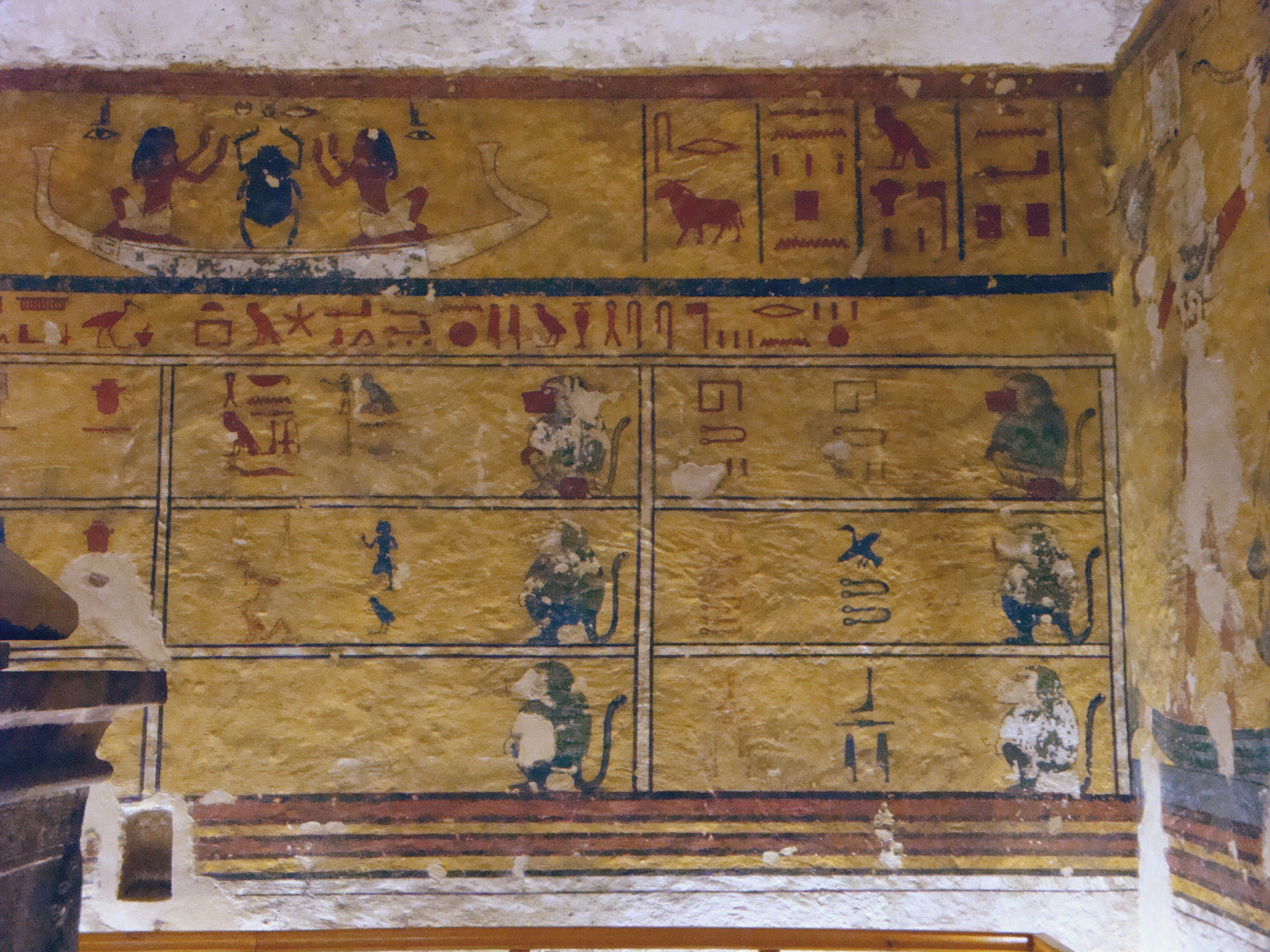
Burial chamber of pharaoh Ay (WV23)

A chamber tomb is a tomb for burial used in many different cultures. In the case of individual burials, the chamber is thought to signify a higher status for the interred than a simple grave. Built from rock or sometimes wood, the chambers could also serve as places for storage of the dead from one family or social group and were often used over long periods for multiple burials.

Most chamber tombs were constructed from large stones or megaliths and covered by cairns, barrows or earth. Some chamber tombs are rock-cut monuments or wooden-chambered tombs covered with earth barrows. Grave goods are a common characteristic of chamber tomb burials.

In Neolithic and Bronze Age Europe, stone-built examples of these burials are known by the generic term of megalithic tombs. Chamber tombs are often distinguished by the layout of their chambers and entrances or the shape and material of the structure that covered them, either an earth barrow or stone cairn. A wide variety of local types has been identified, and some designs appear to have influenced others.

== Types and examples ==
General terms:

- Chambered cairn
- Chambered long barrow
- Cromlechs, dolmens and Hunebedden
  - Simple dolmen
  - Great dolmen
  - Polygonal dolmen
  - Rectangular dolmen
- Corbelled tomb
- Chamber tumulus
- Gallery grave including:
  - Allées couvertes
  - Court cairn
  - Giants' grave
  - Naveta
  - the Peak District tomb group
  - Severn-Cotswold or Cotswold-Severn tomb
  - Transepted gallery grave
  - Wedge-shaped gallery grave
- Entrance grave such as
  - Portal dolmen
  - Scillonian entrance grave
- Passage grave including:
  - The tholos tombs of Mycenaean Greece.
  - Mycenaean chamber tomb
  - V-shaped passage grave
  - Cruciform passage grave
  - Clava cairn
- Other types:
  - Domus de Janas
  - Dysser
  - Medway tomb
  - Shaft and chamber tomb

== See also ==
- Tomb of Two Brothers
