= Dardistown Castle =

Castle and House in County Meath, Ireland

Coordinates: 53°40′N 6°19′W

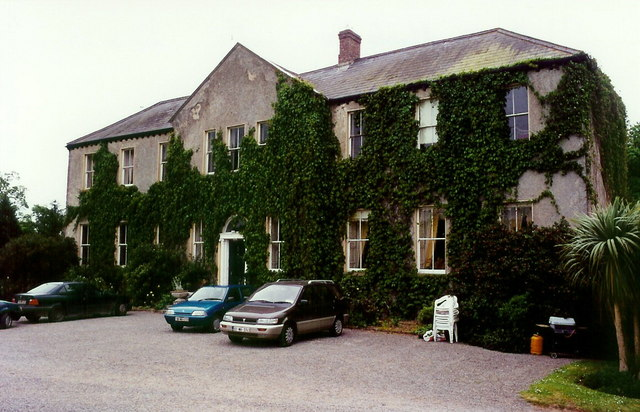
Residential frontage to castle

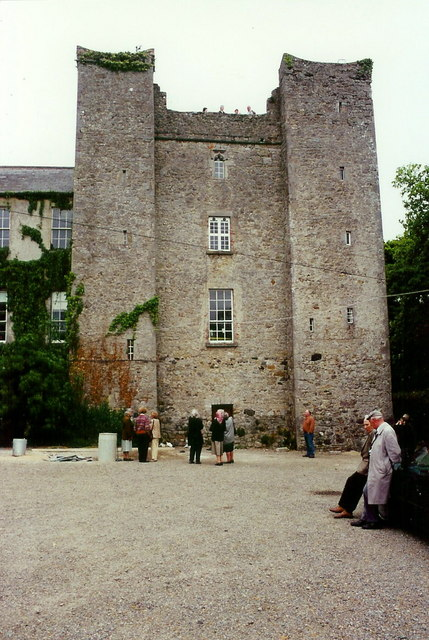
Medieval tower of castle

Dardistown Castle is a castle and country house situated in parkland near Julianstown in County Meath, Ireland a few miles south of Drogheda.

The medieval castle itself is a large four-storey medieval tower house to which a Victorian residential frontage has been added. The tower is square with sides about 44 feet long and 50 feet high, with a turret at each corner. The ground floor contains the main room with vaulted smaller rooms in three of the four turrets. The fourth turret contains an anti-clockwise spiral staircase. All the upper floors have wooden ceilings and fireplaces in each main room. The corner turrets are higher than the rest of the tower and have a small flight of stairs leading to the turret roof. The staircase turret leads to a parapet walk.

The residential extensions were added around 1750 with the addition of a front hall, drawing room and dining room, to which upper floors were later added. Other extensions were added around 1800 and the frontage was built in 1860.

== History ==
In 1449, William Nugent was discharged 20 marks for not building a castle at Dardistown in Meath, and had his letters patent annulled. In the 7th and 8th years of Edward IV's reign, the manor was freed from the charges.

During the Hundred Years' War, grants of £10 were issued to landowners in the Pale to construct fortified houses to aid in their defence in the army's absence. Dardistown Castle was built in 1465 by John Cornwalsh, Chief Baron of the Irish Exchequer with such a grant. It was extended in the 16th century by Dame Jenet Sarsfield, widow of Robert Plunkett, 5th Baron of Dunsany and of Sir John Plunket of Dunsoghly Castle, Dublin, who added a new entrance and other extensions. The battle of Julianstown in 1641 is said to have been fought on the front lawn of the castle when the house was occupied by Richard Talbot: the Talbots, who were related by marriage to Jenet Sarsfield, had inherited it in about 1600.

The castle later came into the hands of the Osborne family who occupied it until recently. Francis Osborne was M.P. for Navan from 1692 to 1703. Henry Osborne (d.10 May 1828) also owned Cooperhill Brickworks which supplied red bricks to many of Drogheda's buildings, including Saint Joseph's Convent (1896), Dublin Road. He also bought the horse pulling a stagecoach in 1827 which later gave birth to Abd-El-Kader, the first successive Grand Nationals winner (for his trainer son Joseph) in 1850 and 1851.

The castle then passed via Samuel Henry Osborne to Henry St. George Osborne, who died in 1899 and after him to his son Henry Ralph Osborne, who died in the 1970s. In 2003 it was owned by Lizanne Allen.

Today the upper floors of the tower have been made available to rent and the castle is open to the public two days a week for most of the year.
