= Nicholas Netterville, 1st Viscount Netterville =

Nicholas Netterville of Dowth, County Meath, Ireland, was born in 1581, and succeeded his father, John Netterville, in the family estate on 20 September 1601. Although an enemy accused them of being "but a mean family" the Nettervilles had in fact been in Ireland since before 1280 and had been established at Dowth for centuries; they were related to many of the leading families of The Pale including the Earl of Kildare, Lord Slane, Lord Howth and the Luttrells of Luttrellstown Castle. Nicholas was the grandson of Luke Netterville, judge of the Court of King's Bench (Ireland) and nephew of the leading barrister and statesman Richard Netterville. His mother was Eleanor Gernon, daughter of Sir James Gernon (or Garland) of Castleton, County Louth. Being "a person of many good qualities" he was created, 3 April 1622, Viscount Netterville, of Dowth in the County Meath, taking his seat, 14 July 1634. He died in 1654 and was buried at Mountown, County Dublin.

== Rebellion of 1641 and Confederacy ==
Despite the Crown's previous regard for him, his loyalty was gravely suspect during the Irish Rebellion of 1641 and the ensuing English Civil War. His eldest son John was one of the staunchest supporters of toleration for Roman Catholics, and since Nicholas permitted two of his younger sons to become Jesuits, there can be little doubt where his own religious sympathies lay. As a result, he and his eldest son seem to have played a double game during the Rebellion, professing their loyalty to the Crown while secretly offering support to the rebels. It may not have been forgotten that Nicholas's family had played an ambiguous role during the Irish rebellions of the early 1580s, in which two of his uncles had been killed, while his second son Luke ("a lawless and ruthless rebel") declared his loyalties unambiguously in 1641, and was killed fighting on the rebel side.

On 26 July 1644 he took the oath of association to the Irish Confederacy and was one of three commissioners sent to accompany the Papal Nuncio, Giovanni Battista Rinuccini, to Kilkenny. In 1647 he took an oath that the Church be restored to its pre-Reformation state, but he actively opposed the Nuncio in 1648 and later joined with Ormonde.

== Last years ==
Under the Act for the Settlement of Ireland 1652 Lord Netterville and his eldest son were denied a pardon for their lives and estates, but he does not seem to have been seriously ill-treated. Whether this was because of his old age or because John's wife, a daughter of the leading English statesman Richard Weston, 1st Earl of Portland, used her influence on his behalf, is uncertain.

== Marriages and issue ==
The Viscount married firstly Eleanor, daughter of Sir John Bathe, Esq., of Drumcondra, Dublin, and had eight sons:

- John Netterville, 2nd Viscount Netterville
- Luke, of Corballis, County Meath, married Margaret Barnewall, daughter of Sir Patrick Barnewall of Turvey and Mary Bagenal, and had issue, including Colonel Francis Netterville. After his death, she remarried Sir Richard Bolton, Lord Chancellor of Ireland. Luke was a man of considerable wealth, but his widow was reduced to a state of near poverty during the troubles of the 1640s. She was still living in 1663.
- Patrick, of Lecarrow, County Roscommon
- Robert, of Cruicerath, County Meath, married Jane Rigdon, daughter of Sir William Rigdon, and had issue, including Nicholas.
- Richard
- Christopher
- Thomas
- Nicholas

and five daughters:

- Mary, married Sir Luke FitzGerald, of Teroghan
- Margaret, married Piers Butler (died 1650), son and heir of Edward Butler, 1st Viscount Galmoye, who was killed after surrendering to a Cromwellian force.
- Alison, married Walter Chevers, Esq.
- Ellen, married to Thomas Fleming, Esq.
- Jane, married to Matthias Barnewall, 8th Lord Trimleston.

Luke, Patrick, Richard and Thomas all took part in the 1641 Rebellion, in which Luke, described by his enemies as a "lawless and ruthless rebel", was killed. Christopher and Nicholas were Jesuits. Patrick and Robert founded junior branches of the family from whom later Viscounts were descended.

Eleanor died in 1634 and the Viscount remarried Mary, daughter of Alderman Brice of Drogheda; it was her third marriage. They had no children.

== See also ==
Butler dynasty

Peerage of Ireland
New creation	Viscount Netterville; 1622–1654	Succeeded by John Netterville
