= Barnaby Skurloke or Skurlog =

Irish lawyer

Barnaby Skurloke or Skurlock (c. 1520 – c.1587) was a prominent and politically influential lawyer in Ireland in the mid-sixteenth century. He held the office of Attorney General for Ireland, and was the first holder of the office to be so described. He was for a short time the acting Lord Chief Justice of Ireland. In later life, he became a leading opponent of the Crown's policies and was imprisoned as a result.

== Background ==
He was a native of Bective, County Meath. His family name is an early form of Sherlock. The Scurlocks were originally from Wales: a branch of the family came to Ireland with Strongbow in the 1170s. The Irish Skurlocks were associated mainly with Meath, and gave their name to Skurlockstown. An Edmund Scurlage was living in Dublin in 1406. Barnaby's parentage is obscure. Sir Henry Sidney in 1577 referred to his "father and grandfather" as having acquired substantial estates, and his father was probably the Barnabas Skurlock who received a grant of lands in Meath in 1529.

== Career ==
Barnaby attended Lincoln's Inn and then returned to practice law in Ireland. In 1554 Mary I appointed him Attorney General for Ireland. He was the first Irish Law Officer to use that title, which replaced the earlier title of King's Attorney. On the accession of Elizabeth I, he was reappointed Attorney General and also acted briefly as Lord Chief Justice, pending a permanent appointment. He was soon removed from both offices: the cause of his dismissal as Attorney General was later stated to be negligence in performing his professional duties, and what would nowadays be called the "leaking" of State secrets. It has been suggested that his dismissal was the cause of his later opposition to the Crown. Whether or not this is true, it is clear that by 1560 the authorities, especially Lord Deputy of Ireland, Thomas Radclyffe, 3rd Earl of Sussex, already regarded him as a troublemaker. From the 1550s on he was consistent in his opposition to the levying of cess (a tax to fund the military garrisons in the Pale). His enemy Sir Henry Sidney later said that Barnaby had made a fortune as Attorney General.

Despite his opposition to cess, Skurlock was surprisingly well-regarded by the authorities: he was on the commission to execute martial law in Meath in 1564, and was party to the renewal of the lease of the King's Inn in 1567. The Lord Chancellor of Ireland, Sir William Gerard, described him as one of the most experienced lawyers in Ireland in 1576, when he was referred to as "one of the Queen's learned counsel". He seems to have suffered serious ill-health around this time, being described as "aged and sickly" (56 was a considerable age then).

=== The cess controversy ===
Serious political trouble arose in the following year, when there was renewed opposition by the Anglo-Irish gentry to the cess. Skurlock was chosen, with Henry Burnell and Richard Netterville, to travel to London to petition the Queen for its abolition, on account of the ruinous cost it imposed on the gentry of the Pale. The Lord Deputy, Sir Henry Sidney, argued that the petition was a defiance of the Royal Prerogative. The Queen agreed and the three petitioners were imprisoned in the Fleet Prison. They were soon released, after having made an abject apology to the Queen and the Lord Deputy, although they did not drop their opposition to the cess.

His last years seem to have been peaceful enough, apart from a dispute with the Lord Justice of Ireland, Sir Henry Wallop in 1584 over the right of Skurlock's sons to take possession of the manors of Skurlockstown and Ifernock. His date of death is not recorded but he was still living in 1586.

== Family ==
He married a daughter of the Lord Chief Justice of Ireland, Sir John Plunket, and they had at least two sons: Oliver, who held the manor of Skurlockstown, and Walter, who was Attorney General for Connaught from 1601 to 1613. The Barnaby Scurlock who surrendered his estate in 1622 and had it regranted to him was probably a grandson of the elder Barnaby.

== Character ==
In character, he was described as "learned, modest and discreet" although his enemy Lord Deputy Sidney, while admitting his "credit and influence", called him a man who had grown "old and crafty", and was given to "indecent and undutiful speech".

Legal offices
| Preceded by Robert Dillon | Attorney-General for Ireland; 1554-1559 | Succeeded by James Barnewall |
