= Jenet Sarsfield =

Irish noble, Tudor era

Jenet Sarsfield, Baroness Dunsany (c. 1528–1598) was an Anglo-Irish noblewoman who lived in Dublin during the Tudor era. She is chiefly memorable for having married no less than six husbands.

== Early life, first two marriages ==
She was born in County Meath, possibly at Sarsfieldstown near Laytown, in about 1528, daughter of the merchant John Sarsfield; very little appears to be known about her mother. Her brother William was an alderman of Dublin. Jenet's first husband was Robert Shilyngford (or Shillenford), who was Lord Mayor of Dublin in 1534–5. They had a daughter, Katherine, who is believed to have been the only one of Jenet's children who survived to adulthood. Katherine married Thomas Talbot and had issue, including Jenet, who married Robert Barnewall, 7th Baron Trimlestown.

After Robert's death, Jenet married James Luttrell, third son of Sir Thomas Luttrell, Chief Justice of the Irish Common Pleas; James was High Sheriff of County Dublin in 1556, and died in 1557. Jenet was pregnant at the time of his death, but their child probably died at or shortly after birth.

== Lady Dunsany ==
After James Luttrell's death, Jenet married as his second wife Robert Plunkett, 5th Baron of Dunsany. The marriage was short-lived. They had two sons who probably died in infancy. Jenet in later years was usually described as the Dowager Lady Dunsany, despite her three further marriages.

== Lady Cusack ==
Lord Dunsany died in 1559, and Jenet quickly remarried the former Lord Chancellor of Ireland, Sir Thomas Cusack. Cusack, who had been born in 1490, was almost old enough to be her grandfather. Although he was an immensely respected public figure, his own marital career had been somewhat troubled. He had divorced his first wife Joan Hussey, and later refused to acknowledge that they had ever been married. His second wife, Maud Darcy, was widely believed to have conspired with her future second husband, Richard FitzGerald, to murder her first husband, Baron Skryne. Both were deeply implicated in the Rebellion of Silken Thomas, Richard's nephew: Richard was executed, and Maud was required to seek a pardon for her act of treason.

Maud's marriage to Cusack was very happy (he refers to her as his "wife beloved" on the family memorial at Trevet). There is no evidence that Cusack and Jenet were unhappy, although she quarrelled bitterly with her stepson Edward Cusack. From Cusack's point of view, her wealth was undoubtedly a consideration in the decision to marry, as he was heavily in debt to the Crown.

=== Widowhood ===
Sir Thomas Cusack died in 1571. A widow in sixteenth century Ireland was by custom entitled to one-third of her husband's estate but Jenet, who was clearly a shrewd businesswoman, inherited much more than that: Cusack left her most of his personal property, and the Abbey of Lismullen, which he had acquired on the Dissolution of the Monasteries. These arrangements led to years of litigation between Jenet and her stepson Edward Cusack, who it has been said must have seen Jenet as the archetypal "wicked stepmother". Jenet sued Edward for ransacking Lismullen and trying to destroy his father's will; he counterclaimed that she had unlawfully retained his mother's jewels. The litigation dragged on into the 1580s, when Edward appealed to the English elder statesman Lord Burghley for his assistance in the matter. He claimed that the parties to the lawsuit were not evenly matched, despite the apparent disadvantage to Jenet of being a woman, since his stepmother through her numerous marriages was now connected with most of the great families of the Pale. No doubt he was thinking especially of her fifth husband Sir John Plunket, an influential judge and Privy Councillor. Jenet eventually vacated Lismullen, although Edward claimed that she had removed most of the valuables. His picture of himself as her helpless victim was wildly inaccurate: he was in fact one of the wealthiest landowners in the Pale, and had enough political influence to obtain a royal pardon when he was convicted of trumped-up charges of treason in 1582, along with the senior judge Nicholas Nugent ( who was hanged). He died in 1596, two years before Jenet.

=== Lawsuits ===
Like many of the Anglo-Irish gentry of the time, (women as well as men), Jenet was litigious by nature, and her lawsuits were by no means confined to members of her own family. In 1572 one of the first cases heard by the Court of Castle Chamber, the Irish equivalent of Star Chamber, was brought by Jenet against Margaret Howth, widow, of Corballis, County Meath, and unnamed others, for riot and kidnapping. Castle Chamber from the beginning was notorious for poor record-keeping and very few details of the case survive, but it is known that Margaret Howth among others was found guilty as charged, and that a number of similar charges were made against her by other plaintiffs.

== Lady Plunket ==
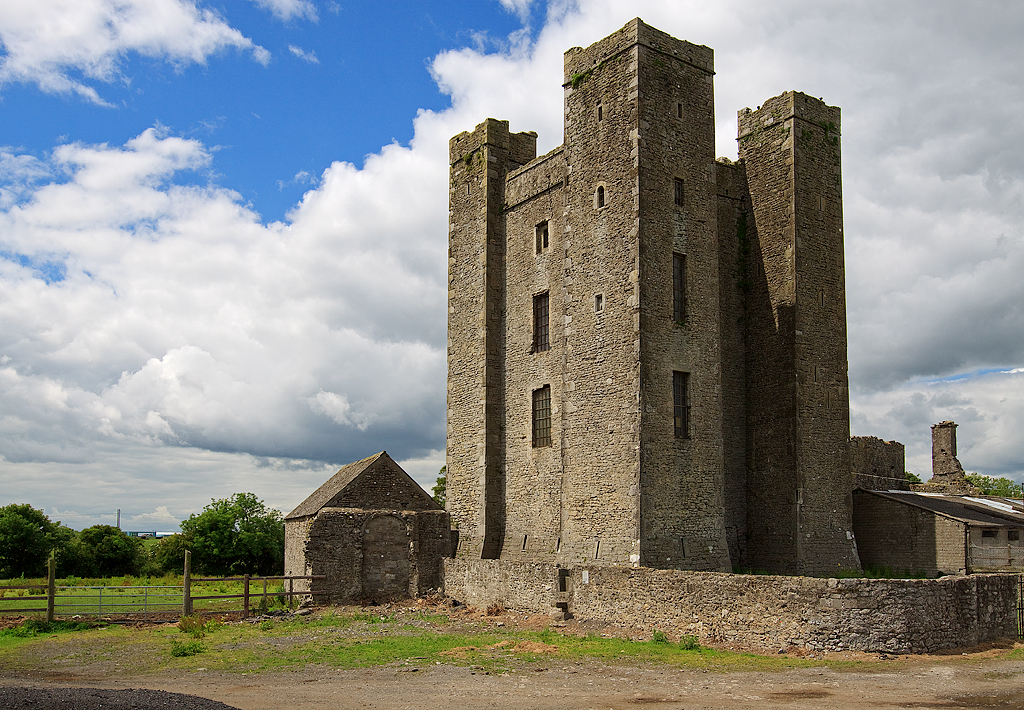
Dunsoghly Castle, which has a memorial to Jenet and her fifth husband, Sir John Plunket.

Her fifth husband was another distinguished elderly judge, Sir John Plunket, the Lord Chief Justice of Ireland. It was his third marriage and, though he was a few years younger than Thomas Cusack, he must still have been over seventy when he married Jenet. The marriage seems to have been happy enough, although Plunket is known to have resented being dragged into Jenet's quarrel with her stepson Edward Cusack. He died in 1582: in his will, although he lists an impressive inventory of valuables, he states that his marriage to Jenet had left him none the richer. They lived mainly as Dunsoghly Castle near Finglas, which survives today. In the adjoining chapel is a tablet displaying the initials of Plunket and Jenet, evidence of a happy marriage.

== Last marriage and death ==
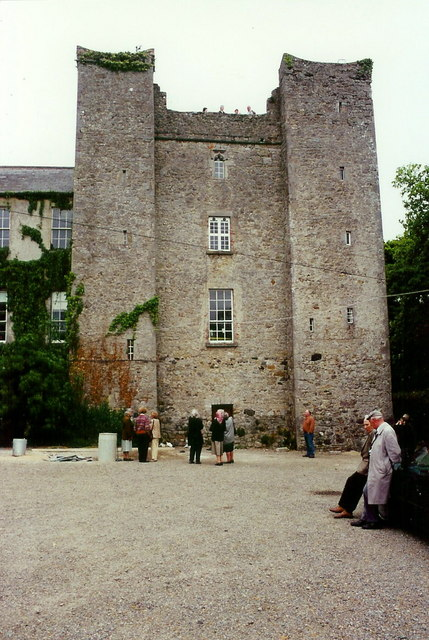
Dardistown Castle, where Jenet lived in old age

Jenet made a sixth marriage to John Bellew, who outlived her. In her last years she lived at Dardistown Castle, to which she made extensive additions. After her death, it passed to her son-in-law Thomas Talbot.

She died in 1598, when she was aged about seventy: she chose not to be buried with any of her husbands but in a tomb of her own, which still exists, at Moorchurch, near modern-day Julianstown in County Meath. She was buried under the title Lady Dunsany.
