= Christopher Delahide =

Irish judge (died 1535)

Christopher Delahide (died 1535) was an Irish judge of the reign of Henry VIII, notable for his opposition to the Geraldine faction, who dominated Irish politics in his lifetime.

He belonged to the prominent landowning family of Moyglare, County Meath. He was a cousin of Richard Delahide, who for many years was Chief Justice of the Irish Common Pleas. Richard, like many public officials, belonged to the Geraldine faction, headed by Gerald FitzGerald, 9th Earl of Kildare, who for decades enjoyed such power that they were called "the uncrowned Kings of Ireland". Christopher, on the other hand, belonged to the opposing Butler faction, headed by the Earl of Ormond. He publicly denounced the perceived misrule of Ireland by the Geraldines, and his hostility to the dominant faction in Irish politics no doubt explains why his attempt to become second justice of the Court of Common Pleas was blocked in 1528, despite the Irish Privy Council having recommended his appointment to the King.

By 1533 the power of the Geraldines was beginning to decline, and a reshuffle of the senior judiciary saw Christopher appointed to the Bench as second justice of the Court of King's Bench (Ireland), apparently at the instigation of the Butler dynasty, as a direct rebuff to the Earl of Kildare. However Christopher died after only two years in office, or, according to Smyth, was removed from office at the behest of the Geraldines. To the last he denounced the alleged misrule of the Geraldines. Had he remained in office for a few years longer, the Rebellion of Silken Thomas, in which the Delahide family were deeply involved, would no doubt have seemed a complete vindication of his fears.

== Sources ==
- Ball, F. Elrington The Judges in Ireland 1221-1921 London John Murray 1926
- Calendar of the Close and Patent of Chancery Rolls in Ireland Dublin Alex. Thom and Co 1861
- Calendar of the State Papers relating to Ireland 1509-1573 Public Record Office Published by Longman Green Brown and Longmans London 1860
- Ellis, Stephen G. Ireland in the Age of the Tudors 1447-1603: English Expansion and the End of Gaelic Rule Longman History of Ireland 2nd Edition Routledge 1998
