= John Garvey (bishop) =

Irish Protestant Bishop

The Right Reverend John Garvey D.D.
- Archbishop of Armagh; Primate of All Ireland
- Church: Church of Ireland
- Archdiocese: Armagh
- Appointed: 24 March 1589
- In office: 1589-1595
- Predecessor: John Longe
- Successor: Henry Ussher
- Previous post: Bishop of Kilmore (1585-1589)

Orders
- Consecration: 25 April 1585

Personal details
- Died: 2 March 1595 Dublin, Ireland
- Buried: Christ Church Cathedral, Dublin
- Denomination: Anglican
- Parents: John Garvey; Fionnghuala Butler
- Spouse: Margaret Plunket, Rose Ussher
- Children: 8, including Christopher

John Garvey (1527–1595) was an Irish Protestant Bishop of Kilmore and Archbishop of Armagh.

== Life ==
He was eldest son of John O'Garvey of Morisk, County Mayo, but was born in County Kilkenny. He was educated at the University of Oxford, graduating in the reign of Edward VI. His first ecclesiastical preferment was the deanery of Ferns, to which he was appointed by letters patent in 1558; in the following year, 13 July, he became archdeacon of Meath and rector of Kells, and in 1560 he was instituted to the prebend of Tipperkevin in St. Patrick's Cathedral, Dublin.

On 27 January 1561, he received letters of denization from the Crown. Becoming an important Crown adviser, he was made dean of Christ Church Cathedral, Dublin, in 1565, and a member of the Privy Council of Ireland. In 1585 he was promoted to the bishopric of Kilmore, on the recommendation of Sir John Perrot, Lord Deputy of Ireland, and was allowed to hold in commendam his deanery and archdeaconry. From Kilmore he was translated in May 1589 to the Archbishopric of Armagh, still retaining his minor preferments; in recognition of service, the payment of his first fruits was remitted. In 1591, in answer to a circular appeal from Sir William FitzWilliam, Lord Deputy, he gave towards the building of Trinity College, Dublin. He died in Dublin on 2 March 1595, and was buried in Christ Church.

== Family ==
He married firstly Margaret, daughter of Christopher Plunket of Dunsoghly Castle in County Meath and his wife Catherine Bermingham, and sister of the Right Honourable Sir John Plunket, Lord Chief Justice of Ireland. Their eldest son was Sir Christopher Garvey. His second wife was Rose Money, widow of Alderman John Money, and daughter of Thomas Ussher and Margaret Geydon, and his successor in the archbishopric was his brother-in-law, Henry Ussher.

== Works ==
A treatise is ascribed to him by Anthony Wood, The Conversion of Philip Corwine, a Franciscan Friar, to the Reformation of the Protestant Religion, an. 1589, published by Robert Ware in his Foxes and Firebrands, Dublin, 1681, from a supposed original, found among the manuscripts of James Ussher's [recte James Ware (historian), his father who seems more likely]. Corwine was a nephew of Hugh Curwen. Robert Ware however was well known as an anti-Catholic forger.
