= Walter Kerdiff =

Walter Kerdiff (died 1557) was an Irish judge and landowner of the sixteenth century.

== Family ==
As his surname suggests his family came originally from Cardiff, but they had long been settled in Ireland, near Finglas in County Dublin, where they are recorded from at least the 1450s. There was also an established de Kerdiff family in Cork, although it is unclear if the two families were related. The bridge now called "Cardiff's Bridge" on the River Tolka was named for the Dublin family.

== Landowner ==
Walter was the principal landowner in Finglas in the last years of the reign of Henry VIII, and later owned lands at Castleknock, Pelletstown (modern Blanchardstown) and Turvey in County Dublin, and at Shallan in County Meath.

He claimed ownership of lands at Dowth, also in County Meath, which led to a lawsuit in 1555 with another High Court judge, Luke Netterville, who was the head of an old-established landowning family from Dowth. Kerdiff's ownership of such extensive lands suggests that, like most of his colleagues, he had acquired considerable wealth from the Dissolution of the Monasteries, although Kenny notes that there is no firm evidence of this.

== Judge ==
Walter was appointed a judge of the Court of Common Pleas (Ireland) in 1535, and served until 1557. He was one of the Irish judges who signed a petition to King Henry VIII in 1541 asking for the legal title to the King's Inn to be vested in the petitioners. He probably retired in 1557, and died later the same year.
