= Nicholas Netterville, 3rd Viscount Netterville =

Irish Jacobite peer and soldier

- Predecessor: John Netterville
- Successor: John Netterville
- Died: 1689
- Father: John Netterville, 2nd Viscount Netterville
- Mother: Lady Elizabeth Weston

Nicholas Netterville, 3rd Viscount Netterville (died 1689) was an Irish Jacobite peer and soldier.

Netterville was the son of John Netterville, 2nd Viscount Netterville and Lady Elizabeth Weston, daughter of Richard Weston, 1st Earl of Portland. In 1659 he inherited his father's peerage. The family estates had been seized under the Act for the Settlement of Ireland 1652; following the Stuart Restoration, Netterville attempted to have the property restored to him. Despite recovering 6,000 acres from the court of claims during the 1660s, this amounted to only one fifth of the seized estates.

Following the Glorious Revolution, Netterville adhered to James II of England and he was made a member of the Privy Council of Ireland upon James' arrival in Dublin in March 1685. In May 1689 he was summoned to attend the Irish House of Lords in the brief Patriot Parliament. Netterville joined James' army during the Williamite War in Ireland, obtaining a commission as a lieutenant. He was taken prisoner in Derry in 1689, outlawed, and died shortly afterwards, possibly of wounds. He was succeeded in his title by his eldest son, John.

Peerage of Ireland
Preceded by John Netterville	Viscount Netterville; 1679–1707	Succeeded by John Netterville
