= V-shaped passage grave =

Type of megalithic chamber tomb

V-shaped passage graves are a megalithic chamber tomb found in parts of Atlantic Europe including Ireland, the Channel Islands and Brittany. They date to between 3500 and 2500BC.

They are similar to Wedge-shaped gallery graves in that in plan they have a narrow entrance that widens out inside into a burial chamber. The entrance passage and the burial chamber are distinguished by sill stones, however, meaning they are part of the passage grave tradition.

In some cases a small sub chamber leads off from the main chamber.

Examples include "La Varde" and Le Creux es Faies on Guernsey and "Le Ruen" and "Ty-ar-Boudiquet" in Brittany.
