= Gerald Aylmer (judge) =

Irish judge

Sir Gerald Aylmer (ca. 1490–1560) was an Irish judge in the time of Henry VIII, who played a key part in enforcing the dissolution of the monasteries. His numerous descendants included the Barons Aylmer.

== Early life ==
He was the younger son of Bartholomew Aylmer of Lyons, Ardclough, County Kildare, and his wife Margaret Cheevers, daughter of Walter Cheevers and Catherine Welles. He married Alison, daughter of Gerald Fitzgerald of Alloone (a cousin of the Knight of Kerry) and his wife Isabel Delafield, daughter and co-heiress of Thomas Delafield of Culduffe, County Dublin. His sister Anne married Sir Thomas Luttrell, Chief Justice of the Irish Common Pleas.

In early life he was loyal to Gerald FitzGerald, 9th Earl of Kildare when he served as sheriff of Limerick in the earlier 1520s. As a partisan of Kildare, (their faction were the so-called Geraldines) he was made second justice of the Court of Common Pleas (Ireland) on 19 December 1528. He was confirmed in that role on 23 August 1532, then presented a critique of the Geraldine administration at the English court in 1533, along with his colleague John Alan, the Master of the Rolls in Ireland. Just before the rebellion of Silken Thomas, the new Earl of Kildare, Aylmer was appointed Chief Baron of the Irish Exchequer on 25 June 1534. When Sir Bartholomew Dillon died unexpectedly after only one year on the bench, Aylmer was named Lord Chief Justice of Ireland on 12 August 1535.

== Military career ==
Aylmer became a principal agent of Thomas Cromwell in Ireland and worked closely with John Alan, the Master of the Rolls in Ireland, in bringing about the defeat of Silken Thomas. He assisted various English Lord Deputies in Ireland in expeditions against the O'Connors (1537) and the Kavanaghs (1538) and was employed in military campaigns against the Geraldines and the O'Neills. He was knighted in the field after the Battle of Belahoe, near Carrickmacross, County Monaghan, in 1539 (a crushing defeat for the O'Neills and their allies), and given a grant of the lands of Dollardstown, near Athy, County Kildare.

== Suppression of the Monasteries ==
Aylmer and John Alan travelled to England in 1536 to receive the bill for the suppression of the Irish monasteries, bringing the legislation to the Reformation Parliament of 1536–7. The resulting Act involved in the first instance the suppression of the monastery of St Wolstan's, near Celbridge, Co Kildare, and assured Aylmer and his fellow chief justice and brother-in-law Thomas Luttrell an annual rent of £4 during the life of Sir Richard Weston, the last prior: in 1538 St. Wolstan's itself was granted to John Alan and his heirs. The Alans remained there for several generations.

Aylmer joined with Alan and others in the comprehensive commission to dissolve other Irish monastic houses, gaining profitable estates in County Meath as a result. He conducted an inquisition at Limerick of ecclesiastical shrines in 1541, and he obtained the Franciscan friary at Drogheda by patent of 16 February 1543 for the price of £54 17s. 3d. Despite his loyalty to Henry VIII is not clear whether he was committed to the Protestant faith: it was not unusual then for members of the Anglo-Irish gentry class to which he belonged to conform to the reformed faith outwardly while remaining secretly loyal to the Roman Catholic church. Later generations of the Aylmer family, including the Barons Aylmer, were mainly Catholic.

== Opposition to Lord Grey ==
Aylmer opposed the policy of the new Lord Deputy of Ireland, Leonard Grey after Silken Thomas's rebellion was quashed in 1536, and campaigned with John Alen to undermine Grey's administration. Aylmer attended Sir Anthony St Leger on his journey to London in 1538, joining the commission of inquiry to bring charges against Grey.

== Four Monarchs ==
Aylmer was knighted in 1539 and survived the downfall of both Grey and Cromwell in 1540 to serve under Henry's successors as King and Queens of England, Edward VI, Mary I and Elizabeth I, being reappointed Chief Justice on 24 March 1547 and on 16 November 1553. In 1541 he was among the Irish lawyers who petitioned for a lease of Blackfriars Monastery in Dublin to establish the predecessor of the King's Inns there.

== Later life ==
Aylmer was named Lord Justice of Ireland along with Sir Thomas Cusack on 6 December 1552, and has a seat on the council. In the mid-1550s his administrative duties were very heavy. He was eventually dropped from the Privy Council of Ireland in 1556 when the new viceroy, Thomas Radclyffe, 3rd Earl of Sussex, replaced the appointees of his predecessor St Leger. Aylmer, due to age and infirmity, now came infrequently to the Irish Council and Elizabeth wrote in 1559 that she wished to promote another Old English lawyer, John Plunket, to the office of Chief Justice in his place. Aylmer was dismissed from office, and died the following year.

== Aylmer family ==
His kinsman and namesake Sir Gerald Aylmer of County Kildare was a leader of the opposition to the cess (the bitterly unpopular tax for the upkeep of military garrisons) among the Pale grandees of the 1580s. He was the first of the Aylmer Baronets of Donadea.

His eldest son Bartholomew predeceased him, but left three surviving sons by his wife Elizabeth Warren of Navan, of whom James succeeded to his grandfather's estates, while Christopher founded a junior branch of the family with its seat at Balrath, County Meath, which in 1718 acquired the title Baron Aylmer.

Aylmer's descendants resided at Lyons, Ardclough, Co Kildare until 1796 when the property passed to Lord Cloncurry, father of Valentine Lawless (1773–1853). It later became the homestead of aviation pioneer Tony Ryan (1936–2007).

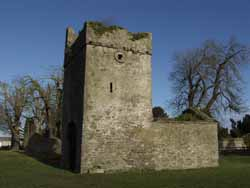
Lyons Castle, Ardclough, which was the Aylmer family home for centuries

== Bibliography ==
- Ball F. E., The Judges in Ireland, 1221–1921, 2 (1926)
- Bradshaw, Brian: The dissolution of the religious orders in Ireland under Henry VIII (1974)
- Bradshaw, Brian: The Irish constitutional revolution of the sixteenth century (1979)
- Brady, Ciaran: The chief governors: the rise and fall of reform government in Tudor Ireland, 1536–1588 (1994)
- Brady, Ciaran: "Court, castle and country: the framework of government in Tudor Ireland", in Natives and newcomers: essays on the making of Irish colonial society, 1534–1641, ed. C. Brady and R. Gillespie (1986), 22–49, 217–19
- Eoghan Corry and Jim Tancred: Annals of Ardclough (2004)
- Crawford, John G: Anglicizing the government of Ireland: the Irish privy council and the expansion of Tudor rule, 1556–1578 (1993)
- Ellis, SG: Reform and revival: English government in Ireland, 1470–1534, Royal Historical Society Studies in History, 47 (1986)
- Ellis: SG: Tudor Ireland: crown, community, and the conflict of cultures, 1470–1603 (1985)
- Hughes, J. L. J. ed: Patentee officers in Ireland, 1173–1826, including high sheriffs, 1661–1684 and 1761–1816, IMC (1960)
- Kenny, Colum: King's Inns and the kingdom of Ireland (1992)
- Lennon, C: The lords of Dublin in the age of Reformation (1989) council book of the Irish privy council, 1556–71
- Royal Irish Acad., MS 24 F. 17 TNA: PRO, state papers, Ireland, SP 63

Legal offices
Preceded by Patrick Finglas	Lord Chief Justice of Ireland; 1535–1559	Succeeded by John Plunket
