= Chamber tumulus =

Megalithic structure

A chamber tumulus is a large megalithic construct found in certain early Neolithic societies. They have been uncovered along the Atlantic coastline in northern Europe, in countries such as France, Spain, Portugal and Ireland. These megaliths have also been found in southern Scandinavia, primarily in Scania and Falbygden. In Denmark there are numerous older megaliths, less advanced that the versions elsewhere, thought to be monuments marking communal burial places.

The chamber tumuli predate the ancient Egyptian pyramids, dating back to circa 6000-3000 B.C., depending on place of construction. Before the large farming reforms of the 19th century there were supposed to have been at least 10,000 of the older megaliths in Denmark. The more sophisticated later version does not appear in Denmark.

The practice of building these monuments is conjectured to have originated in Ireland or on the Atlantic coast of France where the oldest and largest versions of the monuments has been risen.

The newest of those monuments are located in Scandinavia, but pale in sophistication and complexity when compared with the megaliths along the Atlantic coast.

== See also ==
- Chamber tomb
- Dolmen
- Funnelbeaker culture
- Pitted-ware culture
