= Thomas Luttrell (Irish judge) =

Irish judge

Sir Thomas Luttrell Chief Justice of the Irish Common Pleas

Chief Justice of the Common Pleas
- In office 1534–1554

Personal details
- Born: Before 1490 Luttrellstown, Clonsilla Parish, County Dublin, Ireland
- Died: 1554 Luttrellstown, Clonsilla Parish, County Dublin, Ireland
- Resting place: St Mary's Churchyard, Clonsilla, County Dublin, Ireland
- Spouse: (1) Anne Aylmer (m 1506) (2) Elizabeth Bathe (m after 1550)
- Children: Seven sons, 2 or 3 daughters
- Parent(s): Richard Luttrell and Margaret FitzLyons
- Occupation: Landowner

Sir Thomas Luttrell (born before 1490 – died 1554 ) was a wealthy Anglo-Irish landowner of the sixteenth-century Irish Pale. He was also a distinguished lawyer and judge who held the offices of King's Serjeant, Solicitor General for Ireland and Chief Justice of the Irish Common Pleas.

== Background ==
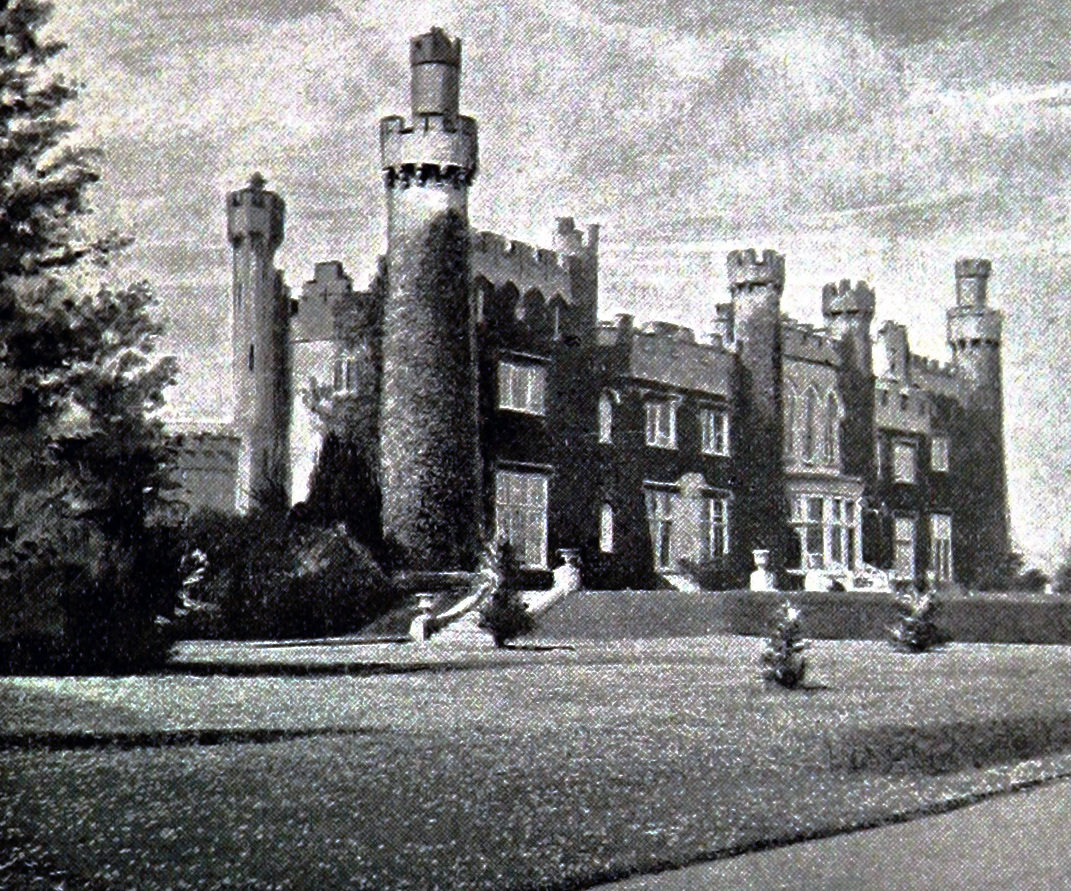
Luttrellstown Castle, painted by Rose Barton, 1898

He was born in Dublin, the eldest son of Richard Luttrell of Luttrellstown Castle, the head of a prominent Anglo-Irish family, which came originally from Lincolnshire, and his wife Margaret FitzLyons or FitzLeones, daughter of Patrick FitzLyons of Dublin. His exact date of birth is not recorded but it was almost certainly before 1490 since his first marriage took place in 1506.

Little is known of his younger years, other than his early marriage to Anne Aylmer. He was involved in a lawsuit over a disputed inheritance in 1527. He was presumably by then a barrister of some years standing, since he became King's Serjeant and Solicitor General in 1532 (the office of Serjeant was much older and more senior). He was spoken of as a possible judge of the Court of Common Pleas (Ireland) in 1533, and in the next year became Chief Justice of that Court, although Burke indicates it was in November 1533, holding that office until his death 20 years later. Like most of the senior judges appointed at this time, he owed his advancement to the patronage of the King's Chief Minister, Thomas Cromwell, although his legal ability was not in doubt.

== In government ==
He was an active member of the Privy Council of Ireland, although for no clear reason he was not appointed to the Council in 1532, immediately on becoming Serjeant, as had been the practice for many years. He accompanied Sir William Skeffington, the Lord Deputy of Ireland, on a mission to negotiate with the O'Toole clan. Luttrell was of great assistance on this mission since (perhaps surprisingly, given his normal attitude to Gaelic culture) he spoke fluent Irish. He took charge of the defence of Dublin in the Lord Deputy's absence and was praised for his diligence in that regard. During the rebellion of Silken Thomas, 9th Earl of Kildare, he was briefly taken prisoner by the rebels: the Kildare branch of the FitzGerald dynasty had always seen him as an enemy, and with good reason, as he had been appointed to the Solicitor General's office and the Bench largely to counter their influence. He sat on a commission into the acquisition by the Crown of monastic lands in 1541, and himself received several grants of lands in Dublin and Meath, notably of the lands of St. Mary's Abbey at Clonsilla, and the revenues of Bective Abbey and St Peter's, Trim. By the time of his death he owned or had a share in six former monasteries. He was knighted in 1540.

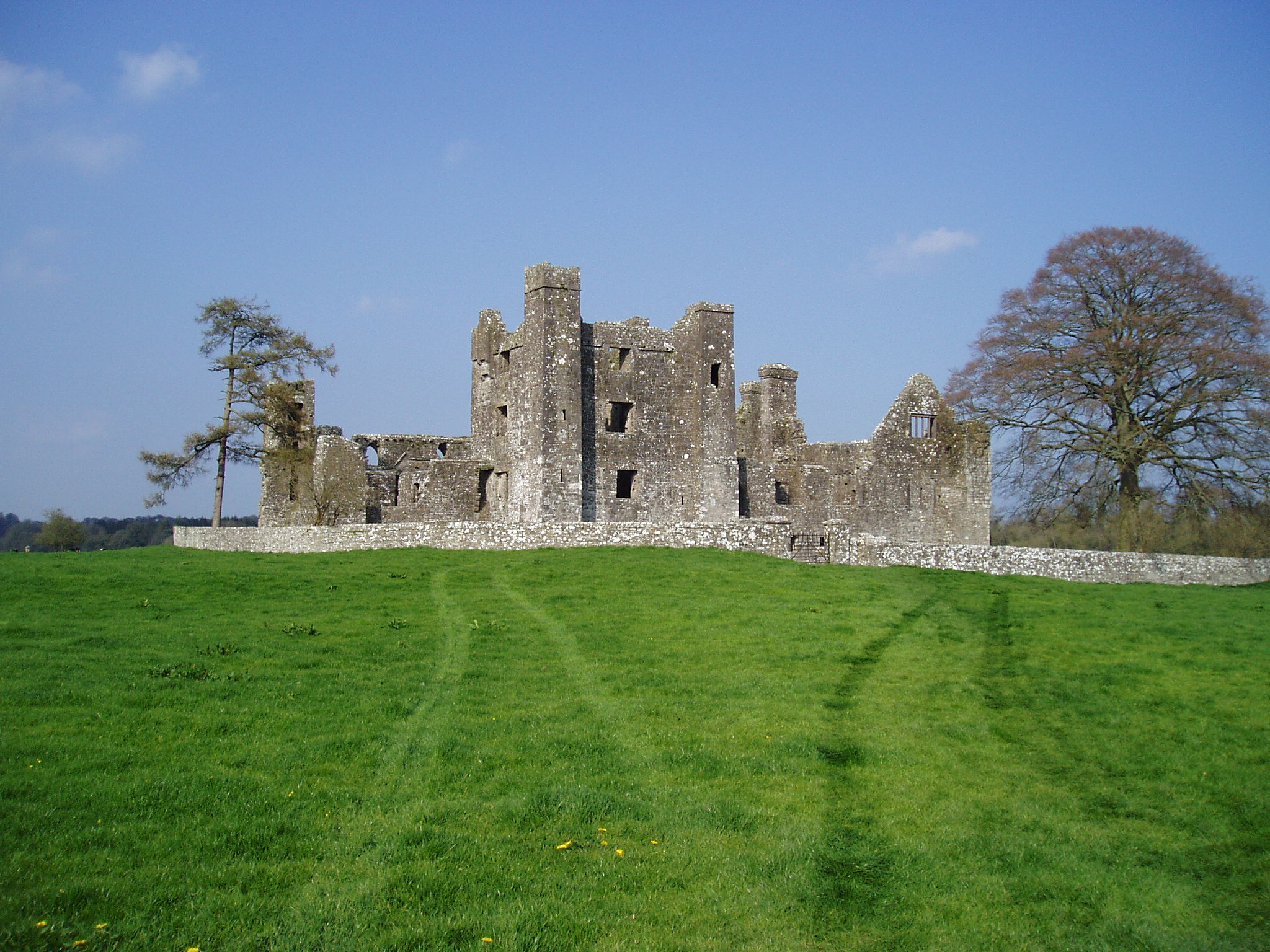
Bective Abbey, Bective, County Meath: Luttrell profited from its dissolution

When Henry VIII set up a commission, headed by Sir Anthony St. Leger, in 1537 on the governance of Ireland, Luttrell submitted a detailed memorandum on the subject. In this paper, he recommended the imposition of the English language and style of dress on the inhabitants of the Pale, the expulsion of Irish musicians from the Pale, and the need to discourage English settlers from returning home. He wrote about the danger of trusting Irish soldiers, the need to subdue the neighbouring Gaelic clans, in particular the O'Byrnes and O'Tooles of County Wicklow, the desirability of the Lord Deputy being English, and the necessity for him to serve a lengthy term of office. He argued that the inhabitants of the Pale were overtaxed, and he recommended the printing of the Irish Statutes.

== Death and memorial ==
Luttrell was in London at the time of Mary I's accession but returned to Dublin and died there the following year. He was a very wealthy man, due partly to his acquisition of monastic lands: his will refers to numerous objects of gold and silver, and in 1538 he was able to present Thomas Cromwell with a goshawk, which was always a very rare bird in Ireland, and therefore very prized. After his death, the Crown asked his executors for a loan of £6000 out of the estate, an indication of the size of Luttrell's fortune.

Though he outwardly conformed to the Church of Ireland, on his deathbed he requested prayers for the salvation of his soul, and the funeral itself was conducted according to the Catholic rite, confirming the general suspicion that he always remained a Roman Catholic at heart. Some of his descendants, notably his grandson and namesake Thomas Luttrell (died 1634), who sat in the Irish House of Commons for County Dublin, were open and politically active Catholics. He was buried by his own direction "with honesty but no pomp" in Clonsilla Church, and left a bequest for the building of a mortuary chapel there. On a more worldly note, he directed that an open house be kept for guests at Luttrellstown Castle.

== Character ==
Elrington Ball sums up Luttrell as "a typical gentleman of the English Pale of his time". Although his family had been settled in Ireland for centuries; although he had constant contact with the neighbouring Old Irish families from his early youth onwards, and spoke fluent Irish, he identified wholly with the interests of England. It is fair to say that Ireland outside the Pale was to him a foreign country. His most attractive quality was the hospitality for which he was famous.

== Family ==
Luttrell married firstly, and apparently, while he was still in his teens (1506), Anne Aylmer, daughter of Bartholomew Aylmer of Lyons and Margaret Cheevers, daughter of Walter Cheevers, and sister of his future colleague Sir Gerald Aylmer. His second wife was Elizabeth Bathe, daughter and co-heiress of Sir William Bathe of Rathfeigh, County Meath whom he married after 1550. By his two marriages, he had at least ten children, including-

- Richard, who predeceased him
- Anne, who married Thomas Dillon of Riverstown, County Meath, and was the mother of Sir Robert Dillon, Chief Justice of the Irish Common Pleas
- Christopher, who inherited his father's estate but died two years after him, without male heirs
- Margaret, who married Luke Netterville, justice of the Court of King's Bench (Ireland): their descendants held the title Viscount Netterville
- Sir James Luttrell, High Sheriff of County Dublin, who inherited Luttrellstown from his brother Christopher; he was the second husband of the much-married Dame Jenet Sarsfield, but they had no surviving issue
- Simon, his brother James's heir, from whom later generations of Luttrells were descended, including the Earls of Carhampton
- Robert Luttrell, m. Elizabeth, 2nd dau. of Robert Rochfort, Esq., of Kilbride, and was father of Richard Luttrell of Tankardstown, County Meath, who m. Anne, dau. of Robert Cusack, Esq., of Cussington, County Meath, and d. in October 1633, leaving two sons and two daus., viz., 1 Oliver, of Tankardstown; 2 James; 1 Jane, m. to Rowland Plunket of Cocklestown; and 2 Mary, m. to George Bathe, of Edickston, County Meath.
- John Luttrell, who m. Mary, dau. of Walter Nugent, Esq., of Moyrath, County Meath.
- Walter
- at least one more daughter.
