= John Plunket (judge) =

Irish political and judge

Sir John Plunket (c. 1497 – 1582) was an Irish politician and judge of the Tudor era who held the office of Lord Chief Justice of Ireland. He was also a member of the Privy Council of Ireland and was regarded by three successive English monarchs as a valued servant of the Crown. He was noted for his integrity, but was criticised for remaining in office when old age and illness had made him unfit for his judicial duties. He was also notable as the fifth of the six husbands of Jenet Sarsfield.

== Background and early career ==
He was the second son of Christopher Plunket of Dunsoghly Castle, Finglas, and his wife Catherine Bermingham. His grandfathers, Thomas Plunket and Philip Bermingham, had presided respectively over the Court of Common Pleas and the Court of King's Bench. His precise date of birth is unknown but Elrington Ball believed that he was at least 85 when he died. He joined the Inner Temple and was Master of Revels there in 1518. He entered the service of Richard Delahide, Chief Justice of the Irish Common Pleas, who had married his sister Jenet; Delahide arranged for him to be appointed a clerk in the Court of Common Pleas. He inherited Dunsoghly sometime before 1547.

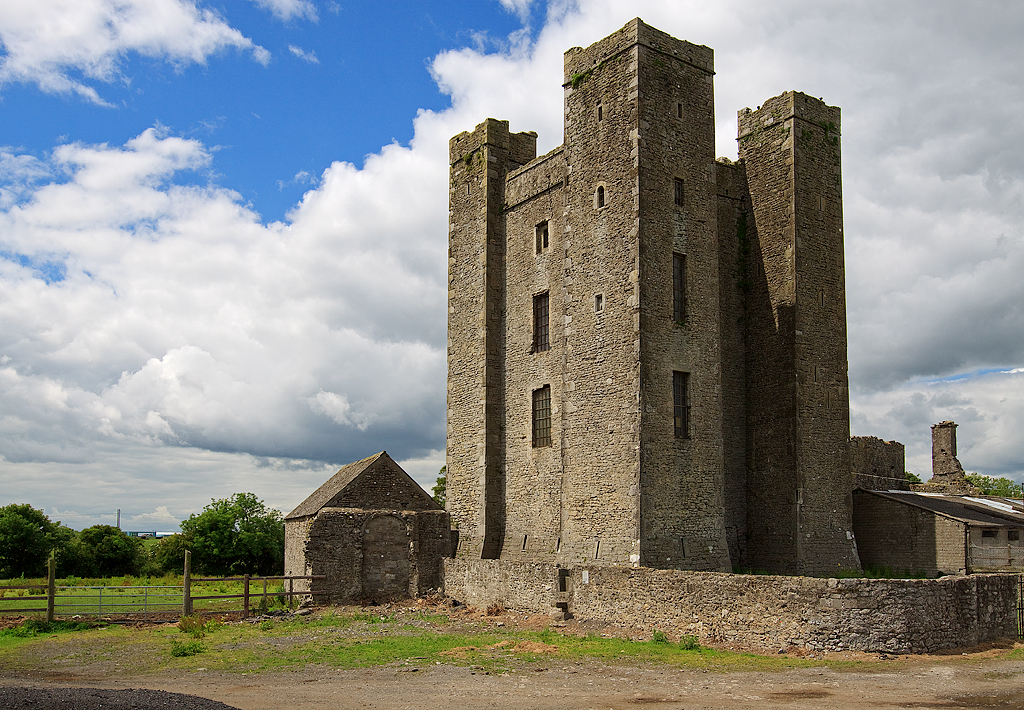
Dunsoghly Castle, Plunket's family home

== Political career ==
In the reign of King Edward VI, he was described as the right-hand man of the Lord Deputy of Ireland, Sir Edward Bellingham, whom he served as Comptroller of the Household; his job included such mundane tasks as providing beds and beer for the Deputy's entourage. He is also said to have enjoyed the confidence of the Lord Protector, the Duke of Somerset.

Under Mary I he became a member of the Privy Council and sat on several legal commissions; he is said to have enjoyed the Queen's personal goodwill. Mary's regard for Plunket was shared by Elizabeth I who as soon as she succeeded her sister as Queen appointed him her Lord Chief Justice.

== Lord Chief Justice ==
He remained a member of the Privy Council to the end of his life, and until his last years, when his health failed, was one of its most diligent members. In 1562 he went to England to report to the Queen on Irish affairs. In 1565, after the long-standing feud between Thomas Butler, 10th Earl of Ormond and Gerald Fitzgerald, 15th Earl of Desmond had erupted into the conflict known as the Battle of Affane, Plunket was entrusted, together with the Lord Justice of Ireland, Sir Nicholas Arnold, with holding an inquiry into the causes of the dispute, and in 1567 he oversaw the confiscation of certain of the Desmond properties. He was knighted the same year.

During the cess controversy, where almost all of the landowners of the Pale objected to the taxation reforms proposed by the Lord Deputy, Sir Henry Sidney, Plunket was almost alone in supporting Sidney, and earned his gratitude as a result (although Sidney privately admitted that he was concerned about Plunket's fitness for office, in view of his age and failing health). Successive administrations praised Plunket's diligence and incorruptibility. However, from about 1577 complaints were increasingly made about his unfitness for office due to his great age and ill health: he was called "an old man, and evil able to attend his place with diligence". As a judge he was less well regarded than as an administrator: he was accused of seriously neglecting his official duties, and of treating the Chief Justiceship as a sinecure.

== Last years and death ==
He remained in office until his death, by which time he was well into his 80s, and said to be infirm and blind. Although his third marriage to the much-married Jenet Sarsfield (who had already buried four husbands, and would marry one more time) seems to have been happy enough, he was troubled by a long lawsuit between Jenet and her stepson Edward Cusack. Not surprisingly he took his wife's side in the dispute and was accused by Edward of corruption and fraud as a result, to which charge he indignantly replied that he had served the Queen uprightly since the beginning of her reign and had never in his life written anything but the truth.

After a long decline in health, he died in 1582. In his will he noted that the money which Jenet had brought him left him "none the richer"; however, he lists among his valuables an impressive collection of silver. He was noted for charitable works: he built two chapels at Dunsoghly and a room over a local mineral spring. One of the chapels contains a carving on which the initials of John and Jenet are visible. Although he was outwardly a member of the Church of Ireland, (his sister, Margaret, married John Garvey, Archbishop of Armagh), he is said to have practised the Roman Catholic faith in private.

== Family ==
Plunket married firstly Elizabeth Preston; secondly Catherine, sister of Sir Thomas Luttrell; and thirdly Jenet Sarsfield. All his children were from his marriage to Catherine Luttrell. They were:

- James, who married Catherine FitzWilliam, daughter of Sir Thomas FitzWilliam of Merrion Castle and had issue including Christopher; after his death, his widow remarried Christopher Preston, 4th Viscount Gormanston, and died in 1602;
- Robert, who married Anne Plunket;
- Alice, who married the leading barrister Richard Netterville, without issue, and died in 1607;
- Janet, who married firstly Thomas Marward, titular Baron Skryne, and secondly Nicholas Nugent, Chief Justice of the Irish Common Pleas, who was hanged for rebellion in controversial

circumstances in 1582;

- Anne, who married Wiliam Bermingham;
- an unnamed daughter who married Barnaby Skurlock.

James predeceased him and Dunsoghly passed to his grandson Sir Christopher Plunket.

== Character ==
Plunket was a popular and respected figure, known as "good Sir John Plunket", and he seems to have had remarkably few enemies. Despite the attack on his probity by Edward Cusack, he was much praised for his integrity. Only in his last years was he criticised for clinging to office when he was clearly unfit for it, and for seriously neglecting his duties. A certain arrogance about his family's lineage was considered to be one of his few faults.

Legal offices
Preceded by Gerald Aylmer	Lord Chief Justice of Ireland; 1559–1582	Succeeded by James Dowdall
