= Nicholas Netterville, 5th Viscount Netterville =

Irish peer

Nicholas Netterville, 5th Viscount Netterville (1708–1750) was an Irish peer, who is mainly remembered for having been tried and acquitted by his peers on a charge of murder.

He was the only son of John, 4th Viscount Netterville, and his wife Frances, daughter of Richard Parsons, 1st Viscount Rosse, and his wife Elizabeth Hamilton, daughter of Sir George Hamilton, Comte Hamilton, and Frances Jennings, later Duchess of Tyrconnell. He succeeded to the title in 1727. In 1731 he married Katherine Burton, daughter of Samuel Burton, High Sheriff of Carlow, and his first wife Anne Campbell, and had one son, John, and two daughters, Anne (died 1756), and Frances (died 1764). Frances married Dominick Blake, of the prominent landowning family from Castlegrove, County Galway, and had several children. Lord Netterville was a prominent Freemason, who served as Grand Master of the Grand Lodge of Ireland in 1732. The artist and writer Mary Delaney dismissed him as "a fool and a fop", but admitted that he dressed well.

In 1742 he was charged with the murder of Michael Walsh of County Meath. Because both the Crown's crucial witnesses died before the trial came on, remarkably little seems to be known about the details of the alleged murder: Walsh is said to have been Lord Netterville's valet, but little else is known about him. Lord Netterville claimed the privilege of being tried by his peers. The case aroused great interest among the public, no doubt partly because it was only five years since another Irish peer, Lord Santry, had been tried and convicted of murder, but later pardoned.

On 3 February 1743 the Irish House of Lords assembled to try Lord Netterville, who pleaded not guilty. The trial lasted for fifteen hours but was something of an anti-climax since the Crown explained that the two principal witnesses for the prosecution had died, and the law of evidence did not permit their depositions to be read in Court. In the circumstances, his peers had no hesitation in finding him "Not Guilty".

He died on 9 March 1750 and was succeeded in the title by his only son John, 6th Viscount Netterville, who is best remembered for building an impressive mansion, Dowth Hall. John died unmarried in 1826, and the title passed to a distant cousin, James Netterville.

The right of a peer accused of a serious crime to be tried by fellow members of the House of Lords rather than a standard civilian jury dates back to Magna Carta (Clause 21). It was officially abolished by the Criminal Justice Act of 1948.

Peerage of Ireland
Preceded by John Netterville	Viscount Netterville; 1727–1750	Succeeded by John Netterville
