= Richard Delahide =

Irish judge

Richard Delahide (died 1540) was an Irish judge of the sixteenth century, who held the offices of Chief Justice of the Irish Common Pleas and Chief Baron of the Irish Exchequer. His career was seriously damaged by the Rebellion of Silken Thomas, in which several members of his family played a leading part, and he was fortunate to escape permanent disgrace.

== Background and early career ==
He belonged to an Anglo-Irish family which had long been settled at Moyglare, County Meath. Sir Walter de la Hyde (note the different spelling), living in 1415, seems to have been a Crown servant in good standing, to judge by the grants of property made to him. Richard was a cousin of another Sir Walter Delahide, who married Janet FitzEustace, an aunt of Gerald FitzGerald, 9th Earl of Kildare. The FitzGerald family had been almost all-powerful in Irish politics since the 1470s, but the ruling class by the 1520s had split into pro-Kildare (Geraldine) and anti-Kildare factions, the latter being headed by the Earl of Ormond. Given their close family ties, it was natural for Richard to look to the Earl of Kildare to advance his career. On the other hand, another of his cousins, Christopher Delahide, who was a justice of the Court of King's Bench (Ireland) in the 1530s, belonged to the opposing Ormond faction, and publicly denounced the Geraldines' misrule of Ireland. Christopher's appointment was widely seen as a rebuff to the Geraldine faction, who had previously blocked his elevation to the Court of Common Pleas (Ireland).

Though little is known of Richard's legal practice, it was almost certainly on Kildare's nomination that he was appointed Chief Justice of the Common Pleas in 1514; he held that office for 20 years, though he was threatened with removal in 1529, an early indication of the decline of the Geraldines power. He was also made Chancellor of the Irish Exchequer in 1533.

== Silken Thomas Rebellion ==
The Geraldine connection proved disastrous for Delahide when, on the false report of his father's death, the 9th Earl of Kildare's son and heir Thomas, nicknamed "Silken Thomas" rebelled against Henry VIII. The judge pleaded that he was completely loyal to the Crown, but apart from his own ties to the FitzGerald family, which had led to an attempt to remove him from office in 1529, the main supporters, if not instigators, of the rebellion were the Delahide family of Moyglare. The "most false disloyal traitor" James Delahide, described as Thomas FitzGerald's "principal counsellor in all his doings" was the son of Richard's cousin Walter. James' parents and his brother John were also said to be involved in the rebellion. Their cousin Christopher, the one convinced opponent of the Kildare faction in the Delahide family, died or was removed from office in 1535. James and John Delahide were attainted for treason, although James's son Lawrence recovered part of the family lands, including Moyglare. Their mother died in prison

In 1534 Richard was removed from office both as Chief Justice and Chancellor of the Exchequer. However, no more drastic action was taken against him, and in time the Crown seems to have accepted that he was personally loyal enough.

== Later career ==
Judging by his letters to Thomas Cromwell, Delahide seemed less concerned at the risk of being condemned to death for treason (he probably knew that there was little danger of this) than with his loss of public office. Elrington Ball quotes his abject letter to Cromwell in 1534 in which Delahide denied that he had ever slandered Cromwell: in good faith I never spoke nor thought to speak any such thoughts...I know it well ye be of our Sovereign Lord's Privy Council and as high in his favour as any man. He greatly resented the loss of the office of Chancellor of the Exchequer to Thomas Cusack but grudgingly conceded: I would have been contented that he should have enjoyed the same accordingly though it had rightfully been mine own. Delahide's main concern was to be restored to the office of Chief Justice: he wrote that there is labours made for mine office of Justiceship wherein I have truly to the best of my little power served the King's Grace by the space of 20 years trusting that there shall be no good cause proved why his Grace should (re)move me from the same.

Delahide's pleas were partly successful: although he was not restored to the office of Chief Justice, in 1537 he was made Chief Baron, and held that office until his death in 1540. By 1538 he was sufficiently restored to favour to receive a lease of some of the forfeited Kildare estates.

== Personal life ==
He married Jenet Plunket, daughter of Christopher Plunkett and granddaughter of his predecessor as Chief Justice of the Irish Common Pleas, Sir Thomas Plunket; they had at least one son, George, who obtained livery of his father's land in 1542. Richard lived partly at Loughshinny in north County Dublin, and partly at the Castle of the Ward. His widow and son were still living at the Ward in 1542, but it later came into possession of Lord Howth.

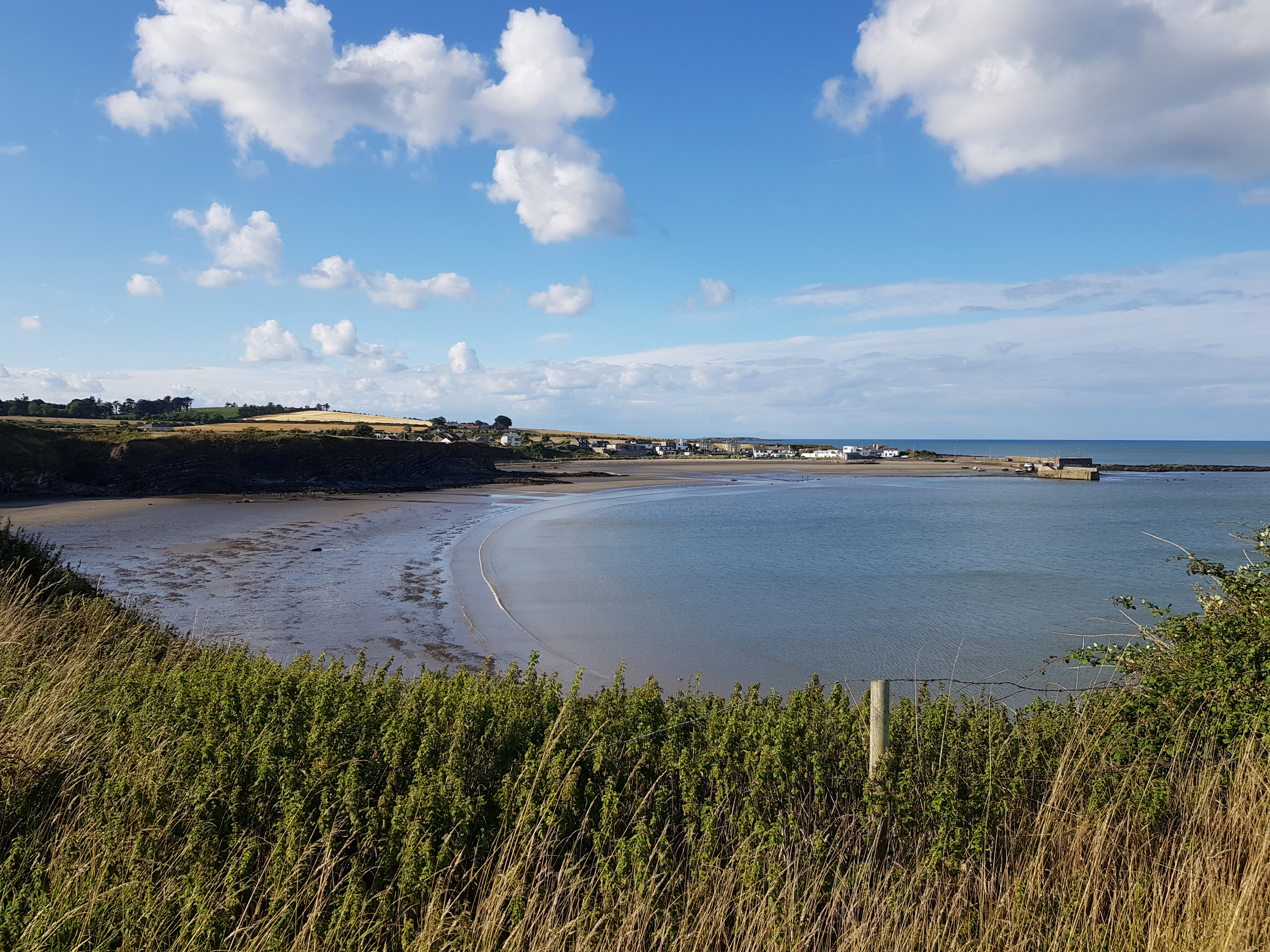
Loughshinny, County Dublin, Delahide's home
