= Dunsoghly Castle =

- Caisleán Dún Sochlaigh (Irish)
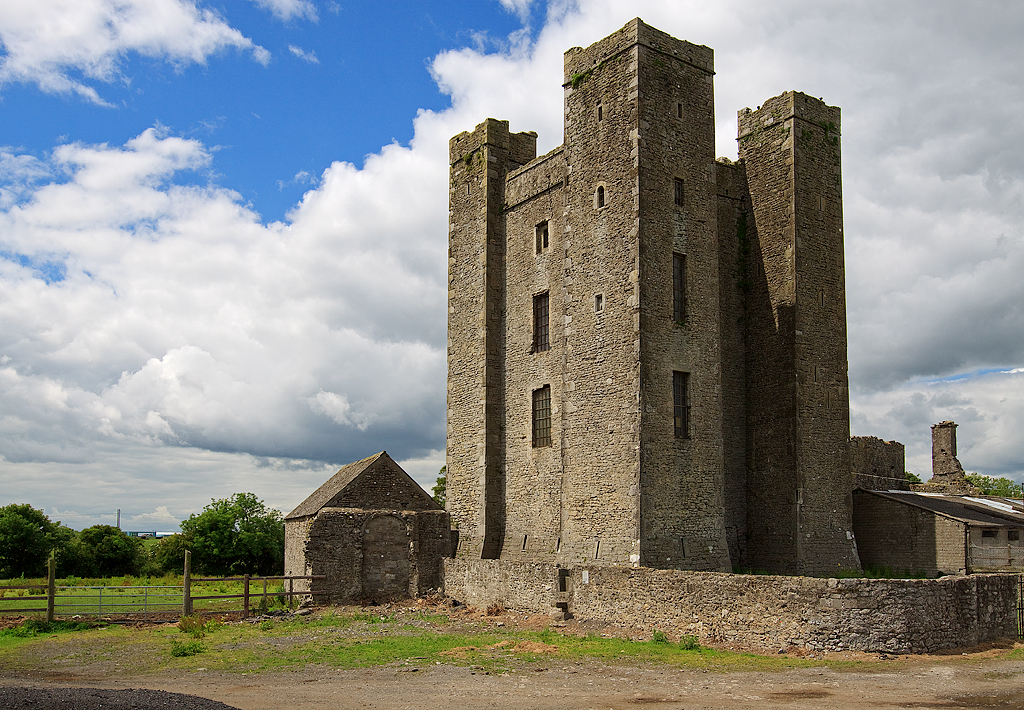

- Location within Dublin
- 53.426923°N 6.318328°W
- Type: castle
- Location: Dunsoghly, St. Margaret's, County Dublin, Ireland

History
- Built: c. 1450

National monument of Ireland
- Official name: Dunsoghly Castle
- Reference no.: 230

Dunsoghly Castle is a castle and a National Monument located in the civil parish of St. Margaret's, County Dublin, Ireland. The castle has been in state ownership since 1914. It is managed by the Office of Public Works.

== History ==
The castle was built around 1450 by Sir Thomas Plunket, Chief Justice of the Irish Common Pleas. It was occupied by the Plunket family until the 1870s, despite "being a cramped Irish castle and uncomfortable by post-medieval standards". The castle's main tower is four-storey's tall and has tapering (almost square) turrets at each corner, rising above the parapet.

The roof, which is arch-braced with four oak principals, has served as a model for restorations at Bunratty Castle and Rothe House. On each collar-beam of the roof stands a king-post supporting a purlin and cross-pieces below the ridge. The rafters are laid flat rather than on edge as in modern roofs and the framework is covered with split laths.

There is a small chapel to the south bearing the year "1573" over the door, the Instruments of the Passion and the initials of Sir John Plunket and his third wife Jenet Sarsfield. Sir John Plunket was the grandson of Sir Thomas Plunket, who built Dunsoghly, and like his grandfather he was Chief Justice in one of the courts of common law. On the west and south of the castle are remains of earthwork defences which were reputedly constructed in the mid-17th century.

== Popular culture ==
Dunsoghly was used as Edinburgh Castle set in the 1995 film Braveheart.
