= Corbelled tomb =

Type of tomb

A corbelled tomb is a generic term given to burial tombs with corbelled roofs rather than simple slabs, which generally denote an earlier type of construction.

== Geographic distribution ==
Corbelled tombs are widely distributed throughout Europe and the Middle East.

In Europe they include the Mycenean tholos tomb type. There is an example at Tsepi, in Attica, near Marathon, Greece. There is also a corbelled tomb in Ile Longue, in France, one of four distinct types used the Breton megalithic tombs. At Collorgues in the southern French department of Gard, in the Pyrenees, and in Andalusia, corbelled tombs are all associated with the Beaker pottery culture. Perhaps the "finest example is the corbelled tomb at New Grange," in Ireland. Beaker pottery has been found in or associated with corbelled tombs from southern Portugal and Spain to Normandy in northern France, and more controversially, to Scotland.

In Abu Dhabi, a corbelled tomb (labeled 1303) was broken into and later re-used. A corbelled tomb was discovered in 1976 in Al Hisn (in southeastern Arabia), but was not excavated until the 21st century. The South Dahshur Pyramid, built during the 12th Dynasty in Egypt, unusually has two corbelled tomb chambers, two corbelled antechambers, and two entrances. Rectangular corbelled tombs are one of five different funerary structures at Wisād Pools, in Jordan. (The Wisād pools of Jordan are best known as the site of petroglyphs of the Addax and Lesser kudu, which is an interesting juxtaposition.)

== See also ==
- Spyridon Marinatos
- Neolithic culture
