= Viscount Netterville =

- Creation date: 1622; 404 years ago
- Created by: James VI and I
- Peerage: Peerage of Ireland
- First holder: Nicholas Netterville, 1st Viscount Netterville
- Last holder: Arthur Netterville, 8th Viscount Netterville

Viscount Netterville was a title in the Peerage of Ireland. It was created in 1622 for Nicholas Netterville, 1st Viscount Netterville (1581–1654), eldest son of John Netterville of Dowth, County Meath, and Eleanor Gernon, daughter of Sir James Gernon of Castleton, County Louth. The Netterville family are recorded in Ireland from before 1280, and became substantial landowners: they intermarried with leading Anglo-Irish families like the FitzGeralds of Kildare and the Flemings of Slane.

He was a favourite of King James VI and I, who in 1622 conferred the title on him "in consideration of his many good qualities". He suffered considerable financial hardship during the English Civil War when the English Parliament, after the failure of the Royalist cause, sequestered his estates, along with those of his eldest son, John, the 2nd Viscount. During the Irish Rebellion of 1641 John, who adhered to Roman Catholicism, was accused of favouring the rebels, and it does not seem that either side of the conflict fully trusted him. Possibly for this reason his son Nicholas, the 3rd Viscount, had some difficulty after the Restoration of Charles II in recovering the family estates. Eventually, the Court of Claims restored 6,000 acres to him. Because of Nicholas's loyalty to James II the estates were again forfeited after the Glorious Revolution of 1688, but were later restored to his son John, the 4th Viscount.

Nicholas, the 5th Viscount, who succeeded to the title in 1727, gained notoriety in 1743 when he was charged with the murder of his valet Michael Walsh: he was tried by his peers and acquitted. Little is known of the details of the alleged murder, partly because both the Crown's key witnesses had died before the trial started.

His son John, the 6th Viscount, is best remembered for building an impressive mansion, Dowth Hall, which still exists. He died at a considerable age in 1826, without issue. A distant cousin, James Netterville, made a successful claim to be recognised as 7th Viscount; and after his death, leaving no son, another distant cousin Arthur James Netterville made out his claim to be recognised as 8th Viscount. The 8th Viscount had no son and on his death in 1882 the title became extinct.

== Viscount Netterville (1622) ==
- Nicholas Netterville, 1st Viscount Netterville (1581–1654)
- John Netterville, 2nd Viscount Netterville (died 1659)
- Nicholas Netterville, 3rd Viscount Netterville (died 1689)
- John Netterville, 4th Viscount Netterville (1673–1727)
- Nicholas Netterville, 5th Viscount Netterville (1708-1750)
- John Netterville, 6th Viscount Nettterville (1744–1826)
- James Netterville, 7th Viscount Netterville (1773-1854)
- Arthur Netterville, 8th Viscount Netterville (1800-1882)

== See also ==
- Ballinlass incident
