= Dowth =

Neolithic passage tomb located in the Boyne Valley, County Meath, Ireland

- Dubhadh (Irish)
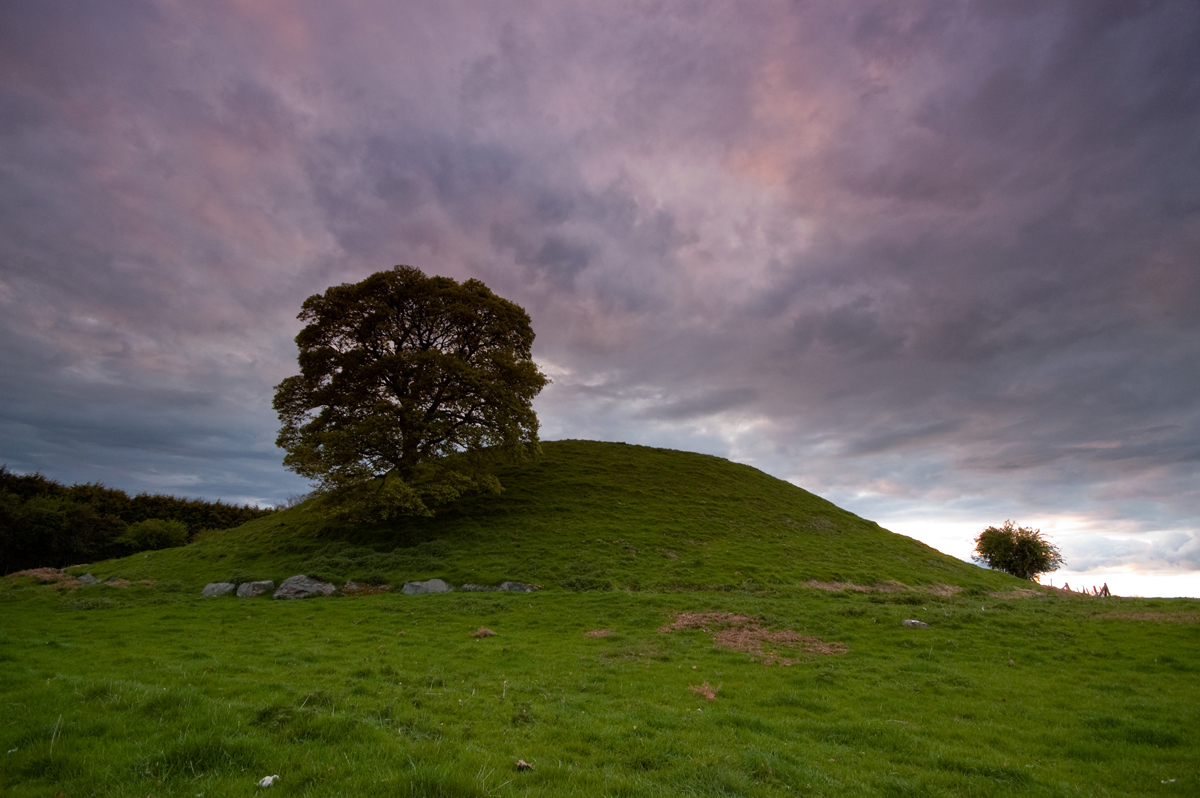

- Location within Ireland
- Interactive map of Dowth
- 53.70365°N 6.4502°W
- Type: passage grave
- Periods: Neolithic
- Location: County Meath, Ireland
- Part of: Brú na Bóinne

History
- Built: c. 3200 BC

UNESCO World Heritage Site
- Type: Cultural
- Criteria: i, iii, iv
- Designated: 1993 (17th session)
- Part of: Brú na Bóinne – Archaeological Ensemble of the Bend of the Boyne
- Reference no.: 659

National monument of Ireland
- Official name: Dowth Mound & Dowth Passage Tomb
- Reference no.: 410 & 652

Dowth (Irish: Dubhadh) is the site of Neolithic passage tombs near the River Boyne in County Meath, Ireland. It is one of the three main tombs of the Brú na Bóinne World Heritage Site, along with Newgrange and Knowth. Its features align it with the other passage tombs, which date from around 3200 BC. Unlike its neighbours, Dowth has mostly been left as a ruin, although its smaller inner chambers are largely intact. The Royal Irish Academy carried out a botched excavation in 1847, leaving a large crater in the mound that has never been repaired.

== Description ==
The cairn or tumulus is about 85 metres (280 ft) in diameter and 15 metres (50 ft) high, and surrounded by large kerbstones, some of which are decorated. Quartz was found fallen outside the kerbing, suggesting that the entrance to this tomb was surrounded by glittering white stone, as at Knowth and Newgrange. Three stone-lined passages lead into the mound from the west. These comprise two passage tombs (known as Dowth North and Dowth South) and a souterrain.

The longest of the passages (Dowth North) is 18.2 metres in length and is crossed by 3 sill-stones and ends in a cruciform chamber with a lintelled (not corbelled as in Newgrange or Knowth) roof. Dowth South is 3.5 metres long and ends in a roughly circular chamber with a modern concrete roof (the original roof having collapsed). In Dowth North, several of the orthostats (upright stones) of the passage and chamber are decorated with spirals, chevrons, lozenges and rayed circles. On the floor stands a single stone basin, 1.4m x 1m in size. The right-hand arm of the cross leads into another long rectangular chamber with an L-shaped extension entered over a low sill, sometimes referred to as 'the annex'. This may be the earliest part of the tomb, later brought within the design of the cruciform tomb. This annex is floored with a 2.4 metre-long flagstone containing an oval bullaun (artificial depression). Until recently, the cruciform tomb was reached by climbing down a ladder in an iron cage, and crawling about over loose stones. Now, access is restricted, and all the features are guarded by metal grilles.

A kerbstone with cup-marks, a spiral, and a flower-like design marks the entrance to Dowth South. While the current roof is modern, it is possible the original one was corbelled, as at Newgrange. This tomb has a few decorated stones and a large right-hand recess.

The third entrance visible on the west side of Dowth is an early Christian souterrain. It leads into the passage of Dowth North and was constructed around the 10th or 11th century. The Annals of Ulster and the Annals of the Four Masters refer to Norsemen plundering the "cave‟ of Dowth around 862; the "cave" in this description may refer to the souterrain as the Irish word for cave and souterrain are the same: Uaimh

The mound originally had about 115 kerbstones surrounding it. Kerbstone 51, sometimes called the Stone of the Seven Suns, features a number of radial circular carvings, similar to those at Loughcrew.

== Archaeological investigation ==
Dowth was excavated in 1847 by the Royal Irish Academy. In this botched investigation, the middle of the mound was almost completely dug out and dynamited. It was not filled in again, and some of the stone was then quarried. This large crater has still not been repaired.

Unlike Newgrange and Knowth, Dowth has not been independently dated, but its features align it with the other passage tombs which date from between approximately 3200 and 2900 BC. In 1970, archaeologist Peter Harbison dated the tomb at 2500 – 2000 BC.

Archaeological and geophysical field surveys of the entire site, including later monuments, were carried out episodically from 2012 to 2015. In July 2018, another passage tomb in the grounds of nearby Dowth Hall was excavated, revealing significant examples of Neolithic rock art similar to those at Dowth and the other Brú na Bóinne sites.

== Astronomical alignment ==
Like its better known neighbour Newgrange, the monument has a significant astronomical alignment. In The Stars and the Stones: Ancient Art and Astronomy in Ireland, Martin Brennan (1942–2023, an Irish-American author and artist) records a remarkable alignment. From November to February, the rays of the evening sun reach into the passage and then the chamber of Dowth South. Brennan reports that, during the winter solstice, the light of the low sun moves along the left side of the passage, then into the circular chamber, where three stones are lit up by its rays. The convex central stone reflects the sunlight in to a dark recess, illuminating the decorated stones there. The rays then recede slowly along the right side of the passage and after about two hours the sun withdraws from Dowth South.

== Myth ==
The medieval Dindsenchas (lore of places) has a story about Dowth (Dubhadh). It says that king Bresal Bó-Díbad compelled the men of Ireland to build a tower to heaven within a day. As this was not enough time, his sister cast a spell, making the sun stand still so that one day lasted indefinitely. However, Bresal then commits incest with his sister, which breaks the spell. The sun sets and the builders leave, hence the name Dubhadh ('darkening'). This tale has been linked with solstice alignments at Brú na Bóinne. It has also been linked with DNA analysis in 2020, which found that a man buried at nearby Newgrange had parents who were most likely siblings. This could mean that knowledge of the events survived for thousands of years before being recorded as a myth in the Middle Ages.

== Gallery ==
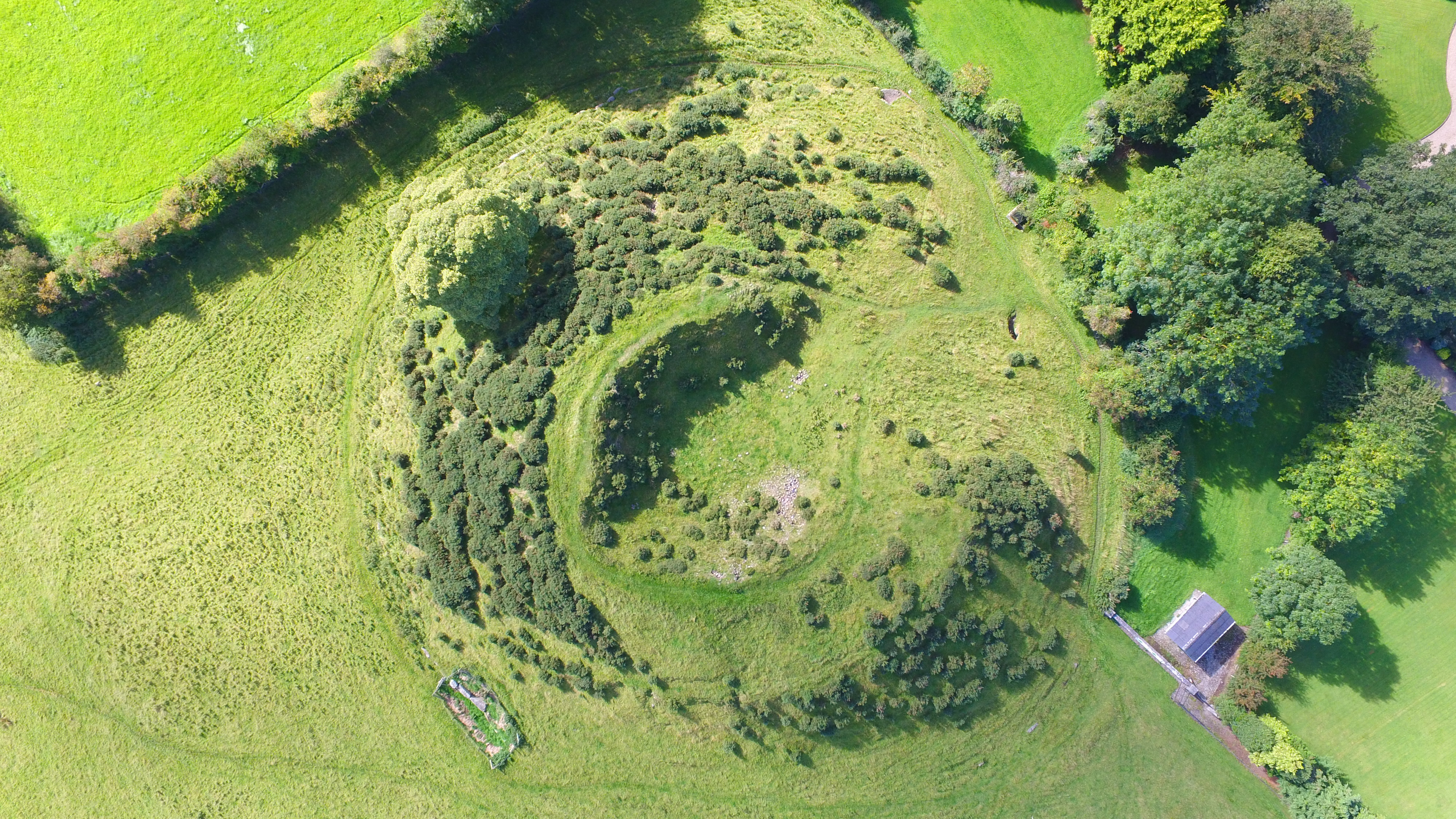
Aerial view

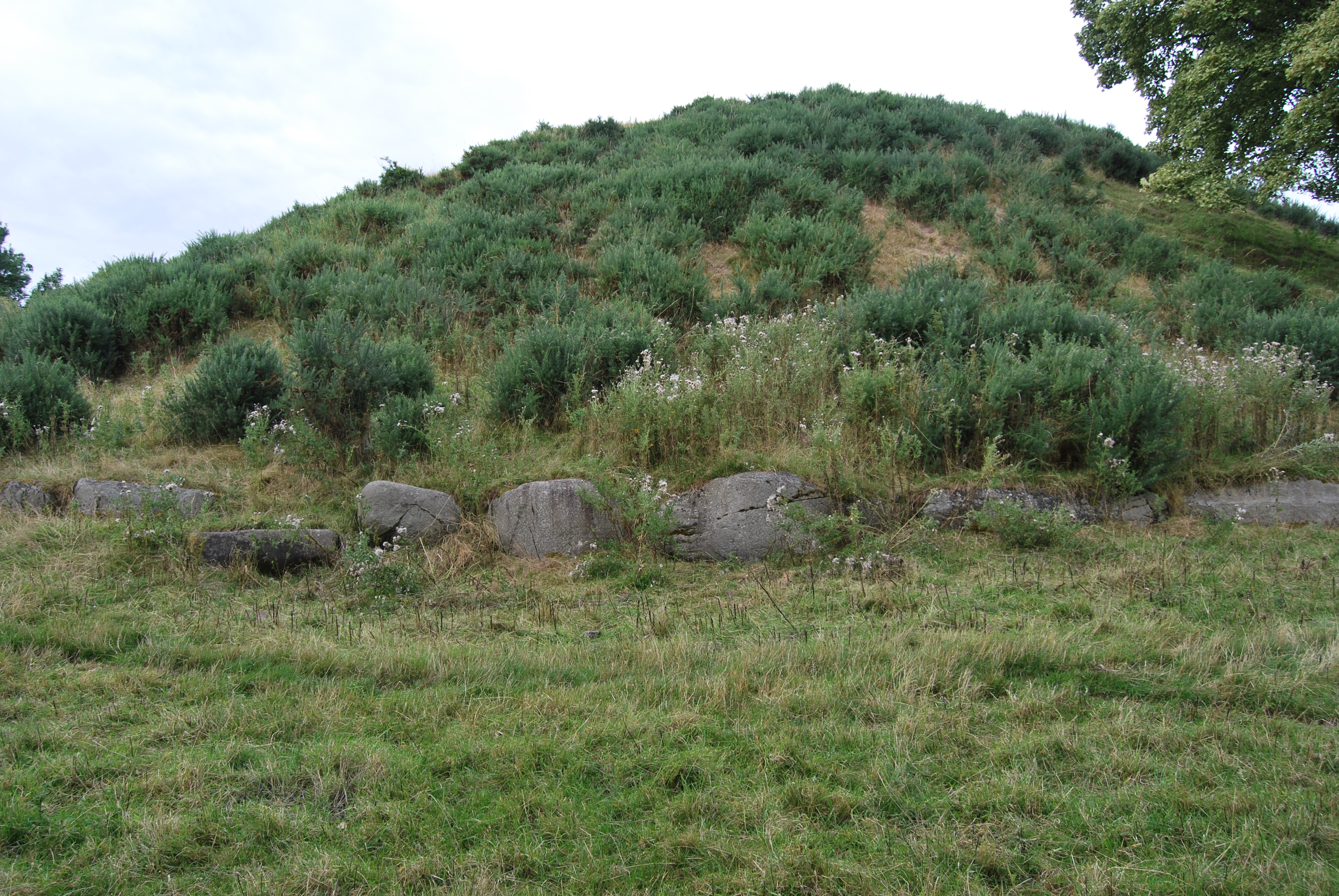
View of mound showing kerbstones

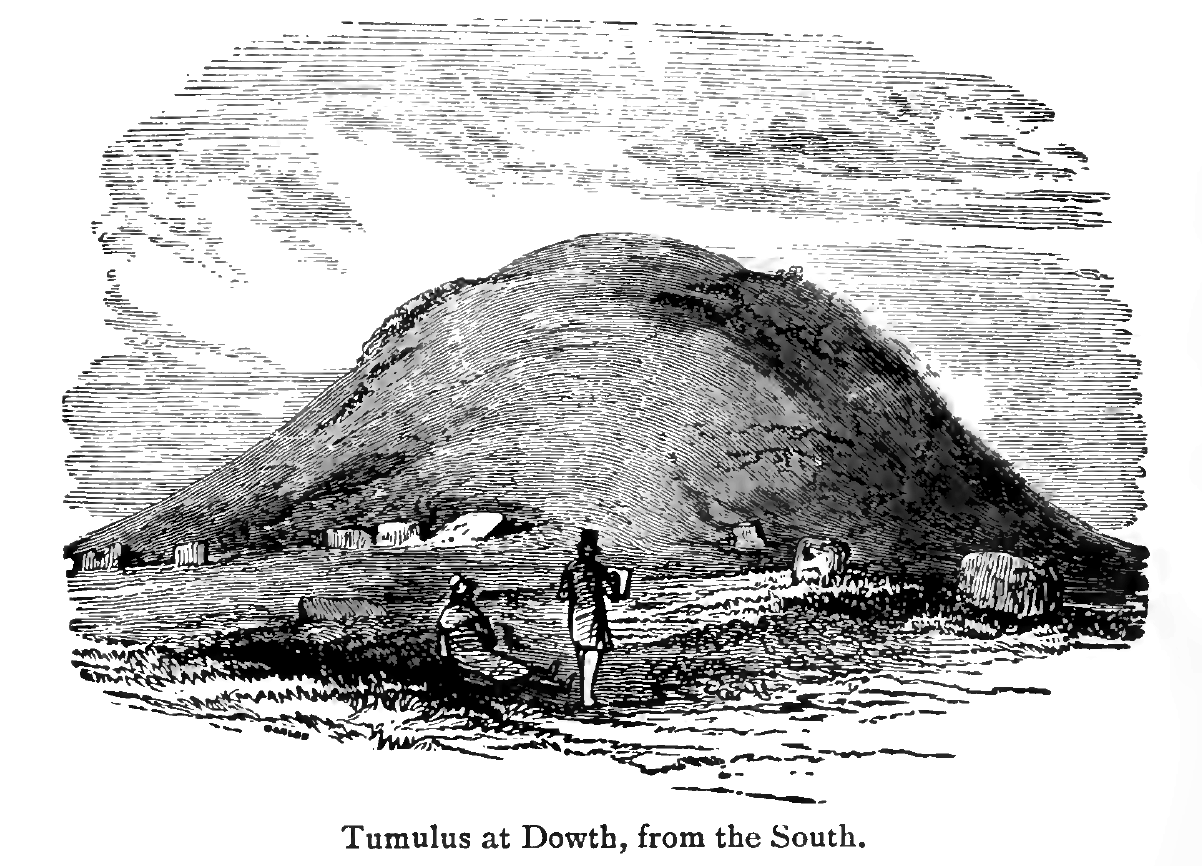
1903 sketch of mound from the south

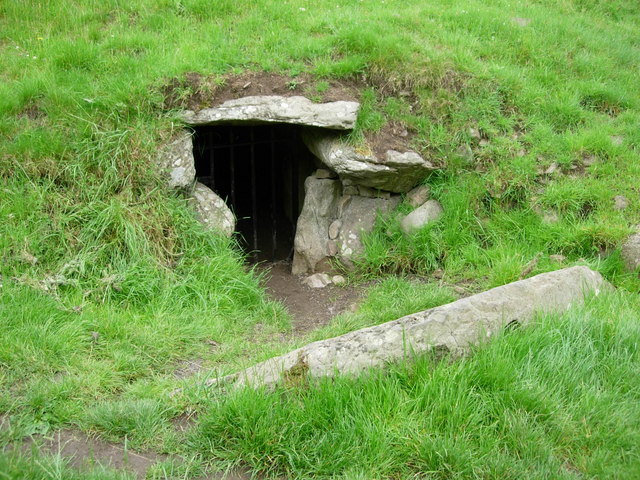
Entrance to the south passage

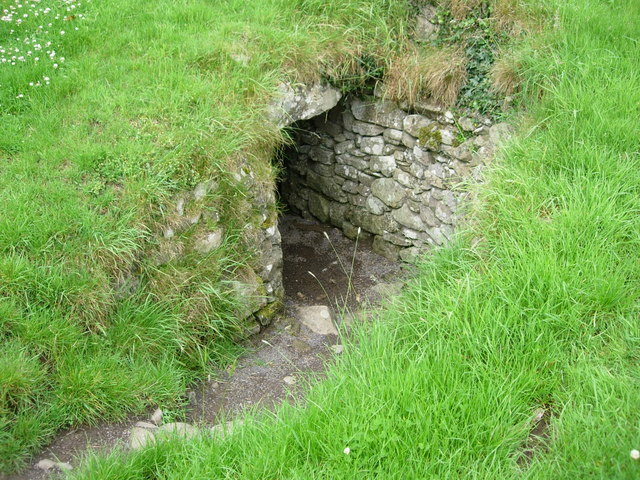
Entrance to the north passage

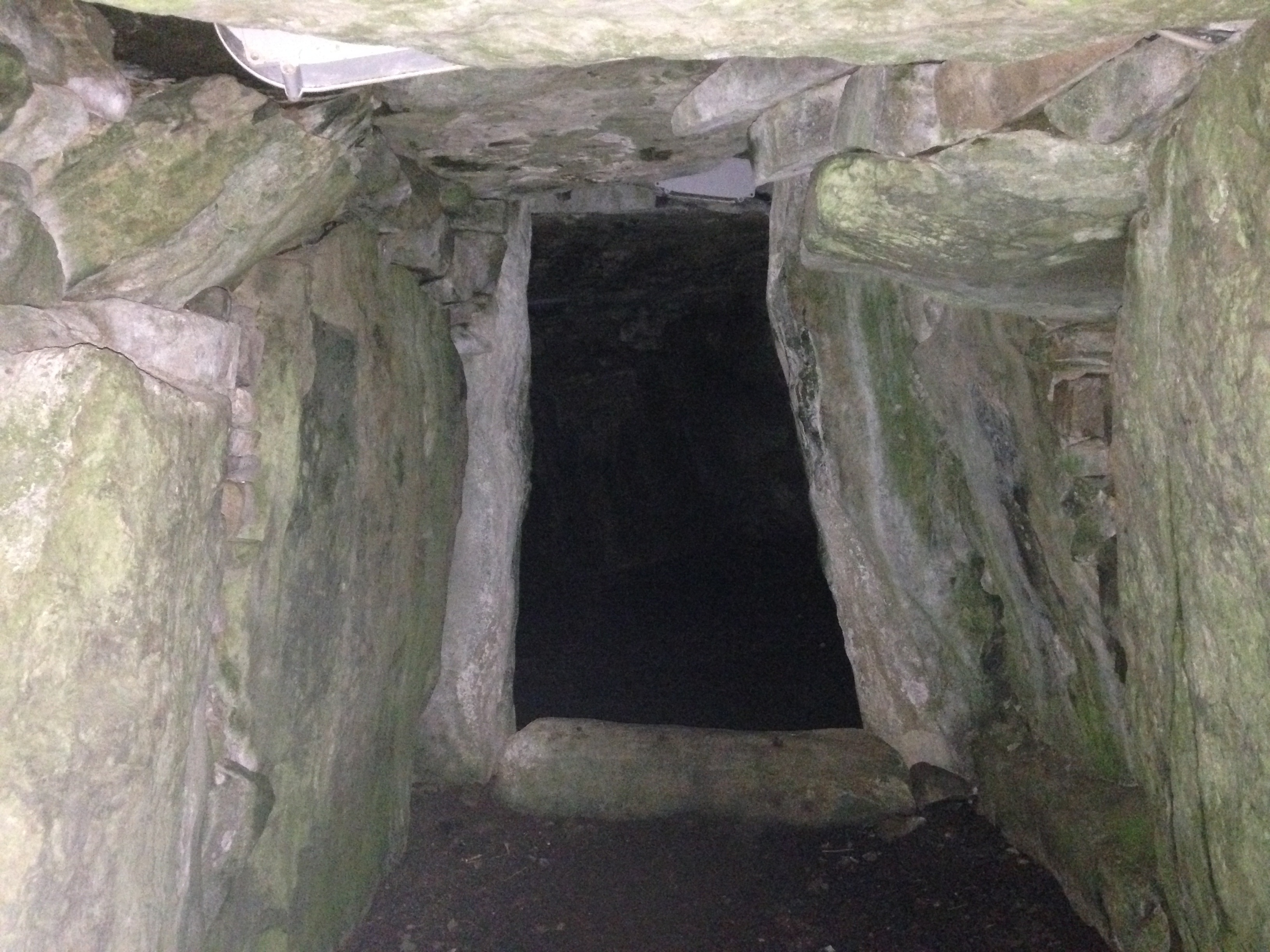
Inside the passage

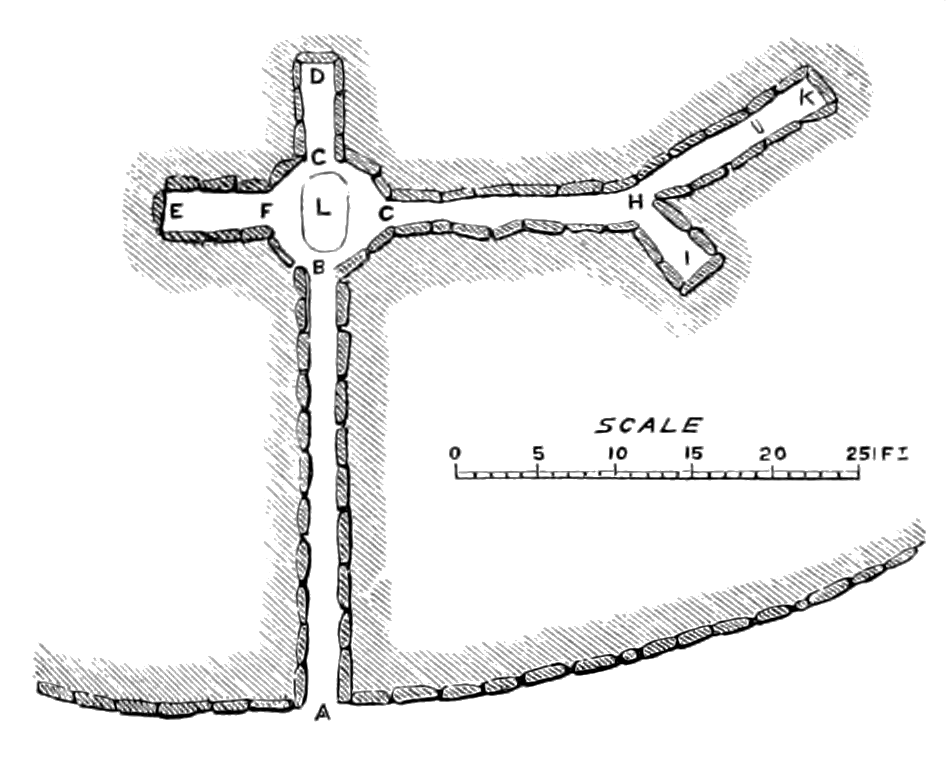
Plan of the interior

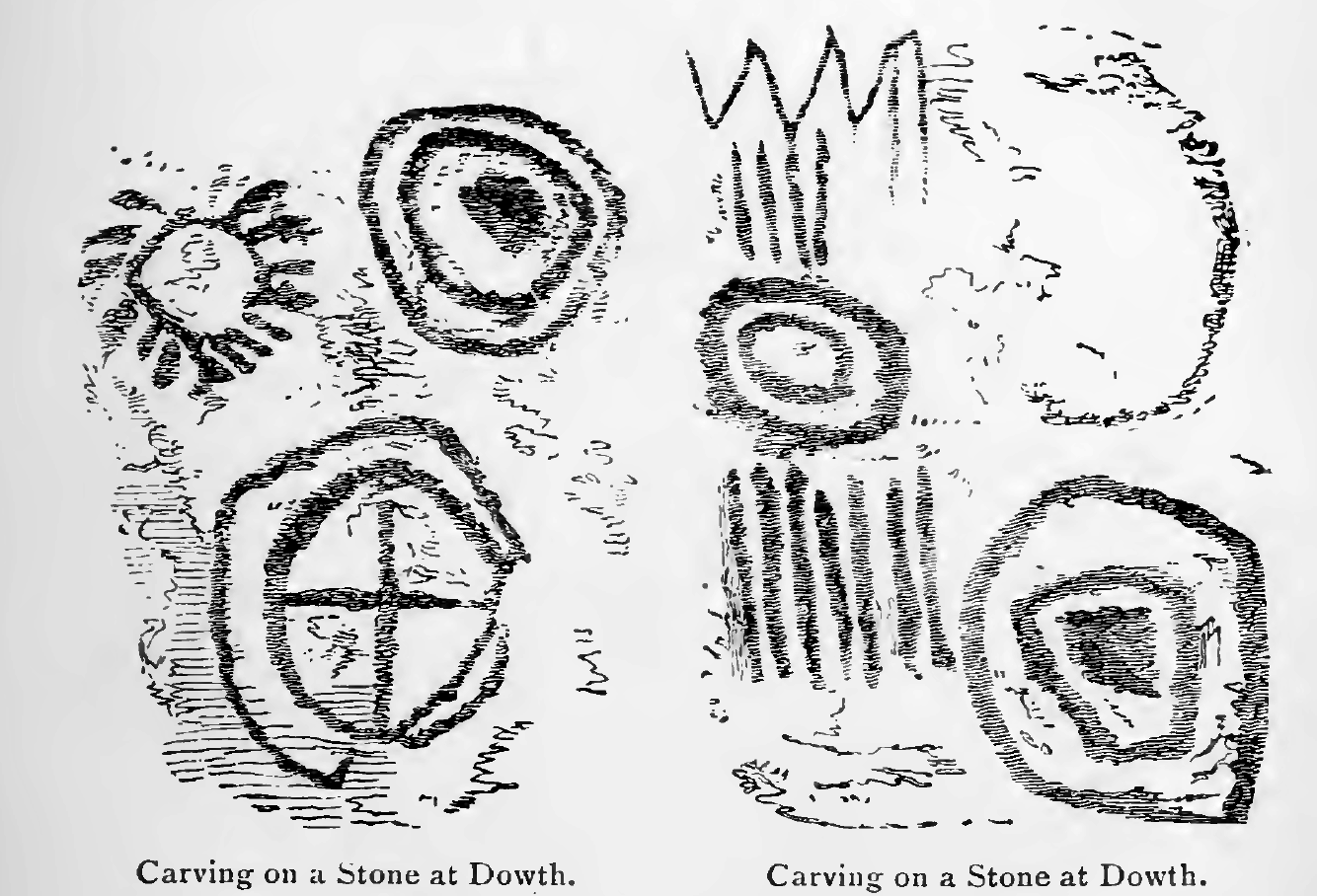
Sketches of Neolithic art from Dowth

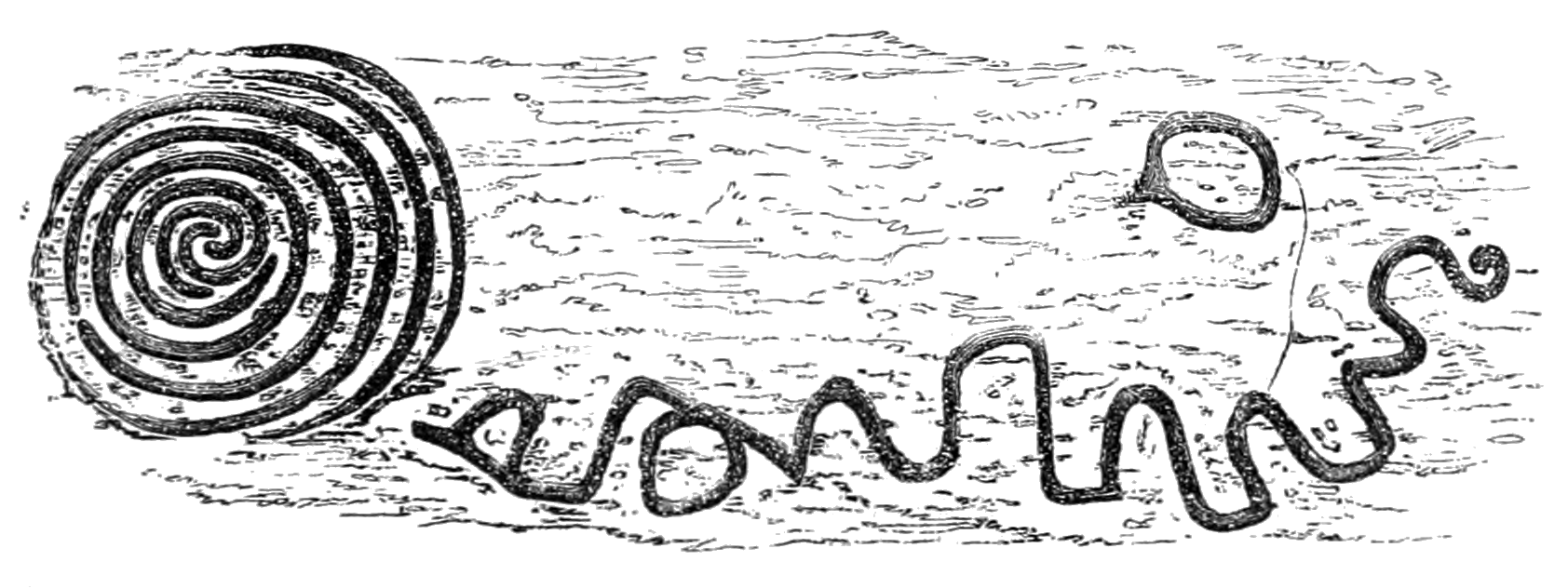
Sketches of neolithic art from Dowth

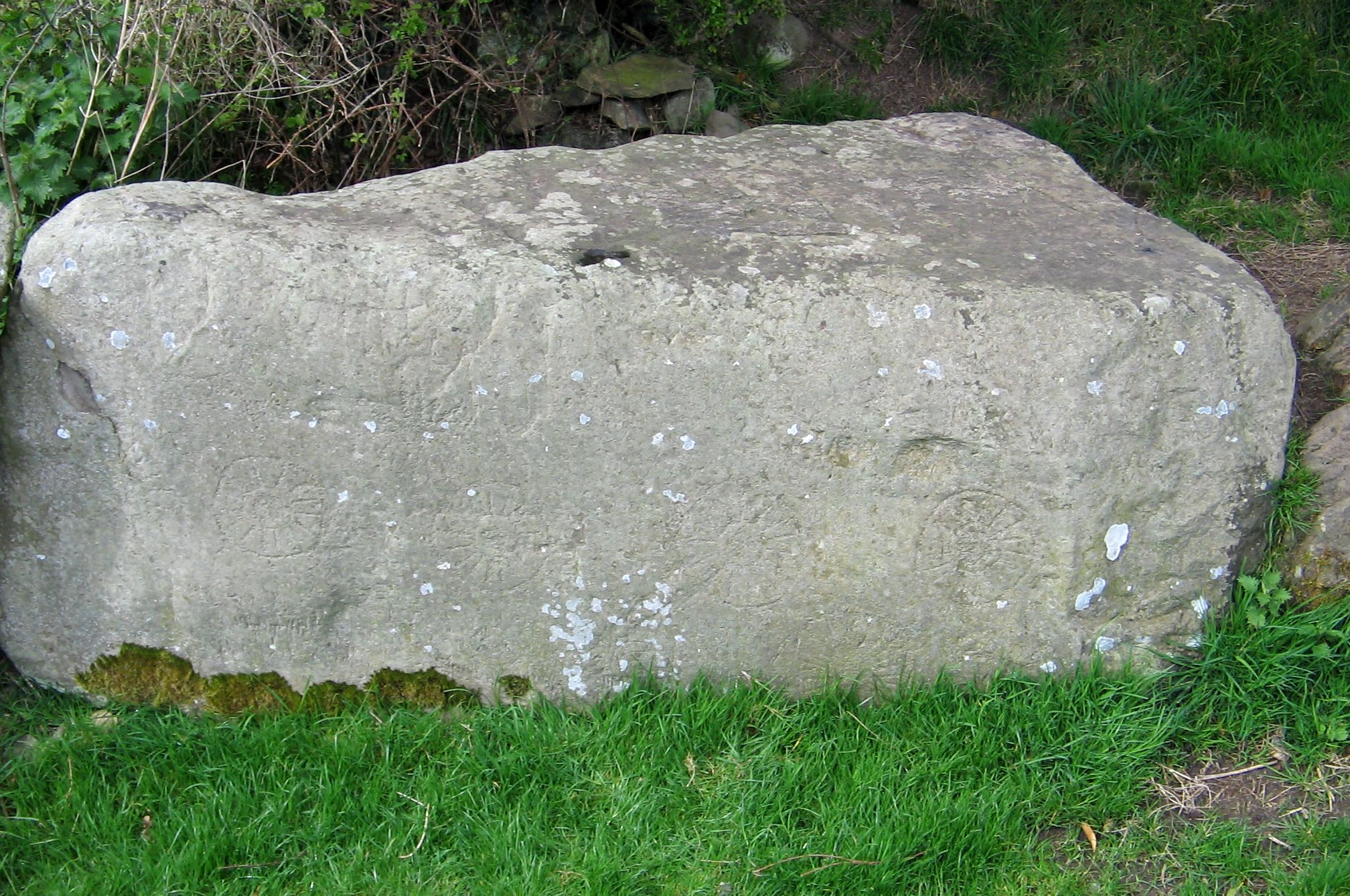
The Seven Suns stone
