= Rawson (surname) =

Rawson and Raws are surnames. Notable people and characters with the surnames include:

Rawson

== A ==
- Albert Rawson (1900–1949), English footballer
- Amán Rawson (1792–1847), American-Argentine physician and merchant
- Anna Rawson (born 1981), Australian professional golfer and model
- Arturo Rawson (1885–1952), Argentine army officer and de facto president

== C ==
- Carlos Rawson (born 1946), Argentine equestrian
- Charles A. Rawson (1867–1936), unelected US Senator from Iowa for nine months in 1922
- Christopher Rawson (born 1941), American writer, university teacher and theater critic
- Clayton Rawson (1906–1971), American mystery writer, editor, and amateur magician
- Sir Alfred Cooper Rawson (1876–1946), British businessman and Conservative Party MP

== D ==
- Don Rawson (born 1937), Australian rules footballer with Footscray
- Donald Strathearn Rawson (1905–1961), Canadian limnologist

== E ==
- Edward Rawson (disambiguation), several people

- Edward Rawson (businessman) (1818–1893), businessman in Atlanta, Georgia
- Edward Rawson (politician) (1615–1693), pioneer of Massachusetts Bay Colony. Father of Rebecca Rawson.

- Elizabeth Rawson (1934–1988), classical scholar and historian
- Elvira Rawson (1867–1954), Argentine suffragist and medico

== F ==
- Farrend Rawson (born 1996), English footballer with Derby County
- Franklin Rawson (c. 1819–1871), Argentine painter

== G ==
- Major-General Geoffrey Rawson (1887–1979), British Army officer and cricketer
- George Rawson (1807–1889), English lawyer, hymnwriter and Congregationalist
- Guillermo Rawson, 19th century Argentine politician

== H ==
- Harry Rawson (1843–1910), British admiral oversaw Benin Expedition of 1897
- Herbert Rawson (1852–1924), English footballer

== J ==
- James Rawson (1965–2024), British Paralympic table tennis player
- Jane Rawson, Australian writer and environmentalist
- Dame Jessica Rawson (born 1943), English art historian, curator and academic administrator
- John Rawson, 1st Viscount Clontarf (c. 1470–1547), English-born statesman in Ireland

== M ==
- Marion Nicholl Rawson (1878–1956), author, illustrator, artist and lecturer
- Mary Rawson, American actress
- Mary Anne Rawson (1801–1887), abolitionist
- Mike Rawson (1934–2000) British Olympic track and field athlete

== N ==
- Norman Rawson, Canadian politician

== P ==
- Peter Rawson (born 1957), Zimbabwean cricketer

== R ==
- Ray Rawson (born 1940), Republican member of the Nevada State Senate
- Rawson W. Rawson (1812–1899), British government official and statistician
- Rebecca Rawson (1656–1692), heroine of Leaves from Margaret Smith's Journal (1849) by John G. Whittier
- Richard Rawson (disambiguation), several people:

- Richard Rawson, aka Fazer (rapper), English rapper and DJ with N-Dubz
- Richard Hamilton Rawson (1863–1918), British Member of Parliament
- Richard Rawson (fl. 1475–1485), father of John Rawson, 1st Viscount Clontarf
- Richard Rawson, Sheriff of London in 1477
- Richard Rawson (priest) (died 1543), Archdeacon of Essex and Canon of Windsor

- Roger Rawson (1939–2009), American teacher and politician from Utah
- Ronald Rawson, British heavyweight boxer of the 1920s
- Roy Rawson (1898–1971), Australian politician

== S ==
- Stratton Rawson, independent film producer, screenwriter and music critic

== W ==
- Wilhelmina Rawson (1851–1933), Australian author and authority on culinary and domestic practices
- William Rawson (1854–1932), amateur footballer who played for England
- William H. Rawson (1892–1957), American Republican Party politician from New Jersey

== Z ==
- Z. B. Rawson (1858–1928), American politician in the state of Washington

Raws

- John Garrard Raws (1851–1929), Baptist minister in England and Australia
