= Edward Rawson =

Edward Rawson may refer to:

- Edward Rawson (businessman) (1818–1893), businessman in Atlanta, Georgia
- Edward Rawson (politician) (1615–1693), Secretary of the Massachusetts Bay Colony
