= Battle of Atlanta =

1864 battle of the American Civil War

- Part of the American Civil War
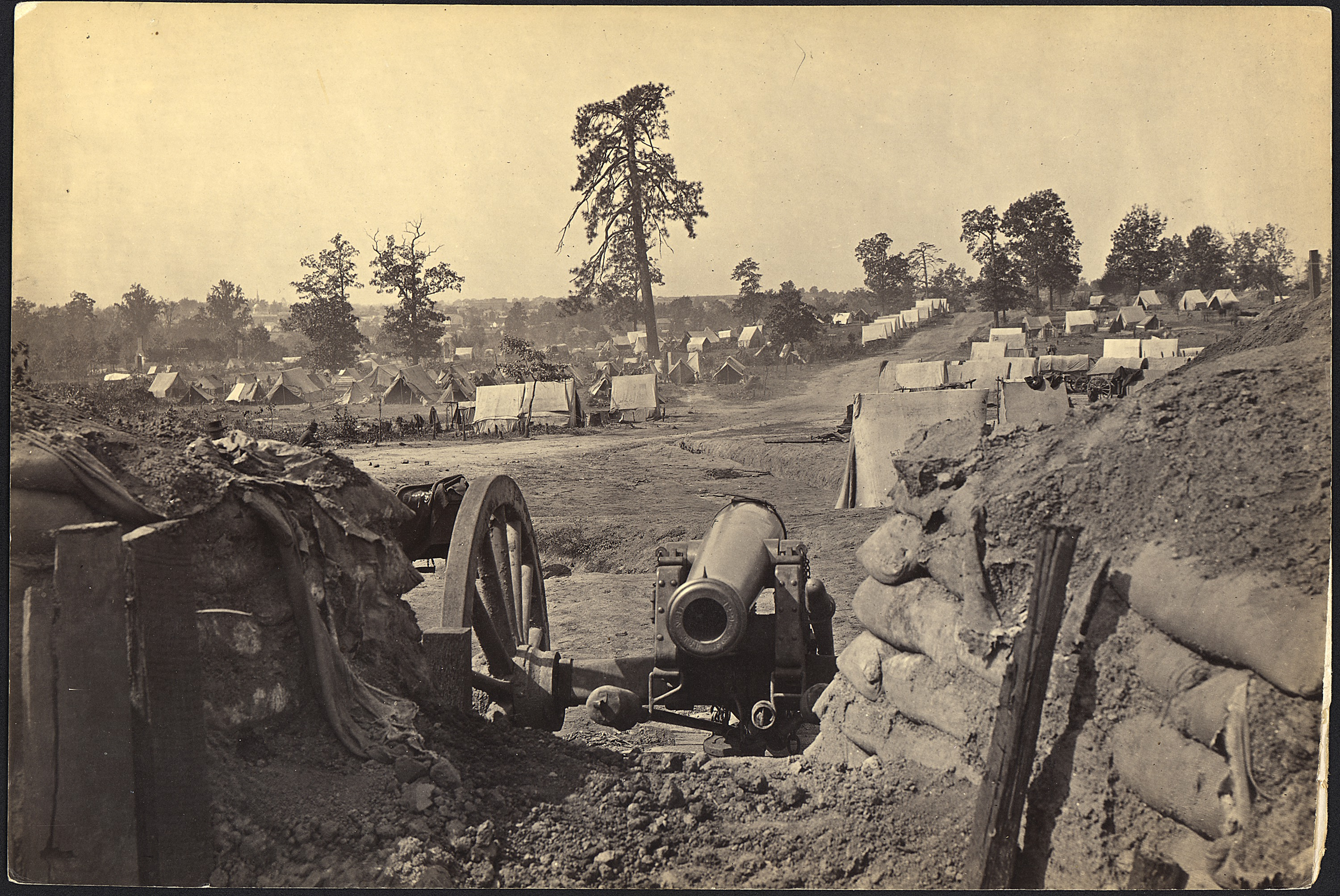
- Confederate works southeast of Atlanta
Date	July 22, 1864
Location	Fulton and DeKalb counties, Georgia 33.7459°N 84.3488°W
Result	Union victory

Belligerents
United States	Confederate States

Commanders and leaders
(United States) William T. Sherman: James B. McPherson †	(Confederate States of America) John B. Hood: Gustavus W. Smith; William H.T. Walker †

Units involved
Military Division of the Mississippi: Army of the Tennessee	Army of Tennessee: 1st Division, Georgia Militia

Strength
34,863 (Note: Livermore (pp. 122–123, 142) cites values of Union troops as 34,863 present for duty and 30,477 effective)	40,438 (Note: Livermore (pp. 122–123, 142) cites values of Confederate troops as 40,438 present for duty and 36,934 effective.)

Casualties and losses
3,722	5,000–5,500
- Location within Georgia

The Battle of Atlanta took place during the Atlanta campaign of the American Civil War on July 22, 1864, just southeast of Atlanta, Georgia. Continuing their summer campaign to seize the important rail and supply hub of Atlanta, Union forces commanded by William T. Sherman overwhelmed and defeated Confederate forces defending the city under John B. Hood. Union Major General James B. McPherson was killed during the battle, the second-highest-ranking Union officer killed in action during the war. Despite the implication of finality in its name, the battle occurred midway through the Atlanta campaign, and the city did not fall until September 2, 1864, after a Union siege and various attempts to seize railroads and supply lines leading to Atlanta. After taking the city, Sherman's troops headed south-southeastward toward Milledgeville, the state capital, and on to Savannah with the March to the Sea.

The fall of Atlanta was especially noteworthy for its political ramifications. In the 1864 election, former Union General George B. McClellan, a Democrat, ran against President Abraham Lincoln, although he repudiated his own party's platform, which called for an armistice with the Confederacy. The capture of Atlanta and Hood's burning of military facilities as he evacuated were extensively covered by Northern newspapers, significantly boosting Northern morale, and Lincoln was re-elected by a significant margin.

== Background ==
Army Commanders at Atlanta

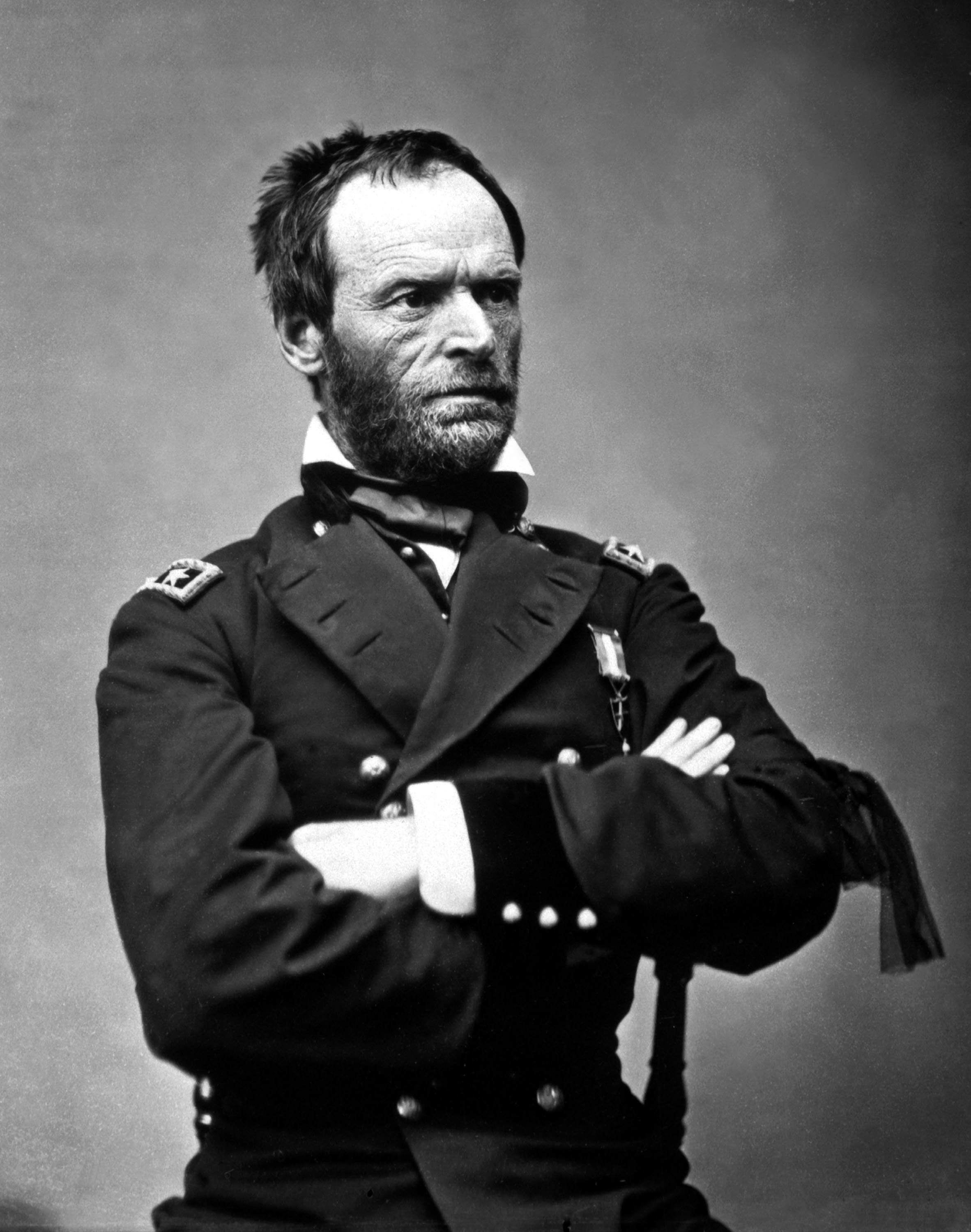
Major General
William T. Sherman,
USA

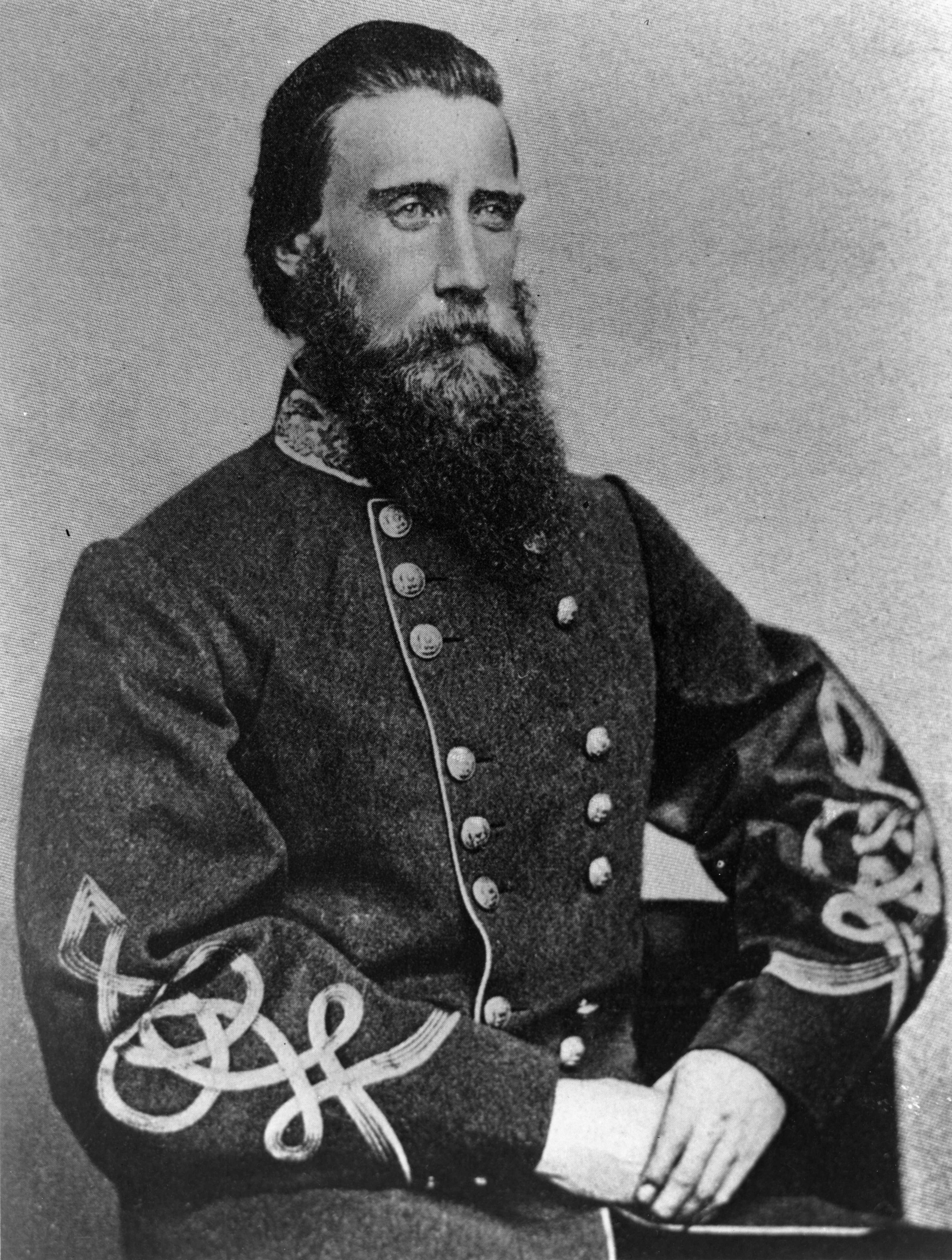
General
John B. Hood,
CSA

=== Objectives and preparations ===
War weariness was growing in the North and President Abraham Lincoln's prospects for re-election were diminishing as a result, (Note: Lincoln was nominated for a second term on June 8, 1864. Eicher, 2001, p. 704.) when on March 9, 1864, Lincoln commissioned Ulysses S. Grant as the only Union Army lieutenant general, then the highest grade in the United States Army. On March 10, Lincoln gave Grant command of all the armies of the United States. On March 12, Grant's appointment as general-in-chief was publicly announced. (Note: The previous general-in-chief, Major General Henry Halleck, was named chief of staff. Long. 1971, p.474.) Major General William T. Sherman was assigned to command the Military Division of the Mississippi, including the Department of the Ohio, Department of the Cumberland, Department of the Tennessee and the Department of Arkansas. Sherman took command on March 18. The assignment made Sherman commander of the Union armies in the Western theater of the war.

Grant devised a strategy for Union victory through simultaneous campaigns against several Confederate armies. Grant wanted to prevent Confederate armies from reinforcing each other in turn and to fatally weaken the entire Confederate Army. Sherman would lead one of two key campaigns. (Note: The other key campaign was the Overland Campaign. The Bermuda Hundred campaign and the Shenandoah Valley campaigns of 1864 were to support the Overland Campaign. Instead of being prepared to move on Mobile when Sherman was ready to move on Atlanta, Union Major General Nathaniel Banks had led his forces on the unsuccessful Red River campaign and was not able to support Sherman at any time during the Atlanta campaign. The delayed and failed Red River campaign damaged an important part of Grant's strategy by enabling Confederate Lieutenant General Leonidas Polk to send reinforcements to Johnston. Nevins, 1971. p. 25.) The objective of Sherman's campaign was to defeat and disperse the Confederate Army of Tennessee under the command of General Joseph E. Johnston, to capture the vital railway center of Atlanta. (Note: The Western and Atlantic Railroad from the north connected at Atlanta to the Macon and Western Railroad to the south. In turn the Macon and Western connected with the Central of Georgia Railroad which ran to Savannah, Georgia at the coast. The Western and Atlantic connected to the Georgia Railroad to the east. The Georgia Railroad ran from Atlanta to Augusta, Georgia where it connected to lines reaching Charleston, South Carolina, Raleigh, North Carolina, and Richmond, Virginia. The final major connection of the Western and Atlantic at Atlanta was to the Atlanta & West Point Railroad to the southwest. The Atlanta and West Point ran to the Alabama border where it connected to lines to Montgomery, Alabama, and indirectly to Selma, Alabama, and Mobile, Alabama. Black III, 1952, p. 6; Castel, 1992, p. 69.) to destroy or damage Confederate war resources as much as possible and to split the Confederacy again as had been done at Vicksburg, Mississippi, and Port Hudson, Louisiana, in July 1863.

On May 4, 1864, Sherman was ready to move his armies from Chattanooga, Tennessee, toward Ringgold, Georgia, with an estimated strength of 112,000 troops. Johnston had between 60,000 and 70,000 effective troops. Johnston had taken advantage of the terrain of woods, hills and rivers in northern Georgia by entrenching his army at Dalton, Georgia, about one-quarter of the way between Chattanooga and Atlanta. (Note: Johnston also had seventeen more defensive positions laid out to his rear over the course of the campaign. Hess, 2018, p. 3.) Historian Allan Nevins wrote that Sherman's numerical advantage did not make Johnston's position hopeless in view of his fortified line of defenses in the rough, confusing, mountainous, wooded country of northwestern Georgia which had poor roads and three difficult rivers to cross. Because Sherman had to keep his Western and Atlantic Railroad supply line open, he could break away from it only for short periods of time. (Note: Sherman had to detach troops to guard the Western and Atlantic Railroad from the point of his advance back to Chattanooga and through Tennessee to keep his supply line secure. During the campaign, the railway was under constant threats and attacks from cavalry and guerrillas. Nevins, 1971, p. 53.)

=== Prelude ===
During the months leading up to the battle, Confederate General Joseph E. Johnston had repeatedly retreated from Sherman's superior force. All along the Western and Atlantic Railroad line, from Chattanooga, Tennessee, to Marietta, Georgia, a pattern was played and replayed: Johnston took up a defensive position, Sherman marched to outflank the Confederate defenses, and Johnston retreated again. After Johnston's withdrawal following the Battle of Resaca, the two armies clashed again at the Battle of Kennesaw Mountain, but the Confederate senior leadership in Richmond was unhappy with Johnston's perceived reluctance to fight the Union army, even though he had little chance of winning. Thus, on July 17, as he was preparing for the Battle of Peachtree Creek, Johnston was relieved of his command and replaced by Lieutenant General John B. Hood. The dismissal and replacement of Johnston remains one of the most controversial decisions of the Civil War. Hood, who was fond of taking risks, lashed out at Sherman's army at Peachtree Creek, but the attack failed, with more than 2500 Confederate casualties.

Hood needed to defend the city of Atlanta, which was an important rail hub and industrial center for the Confederacy, but his army was small in comparison to the armies that Sherman commanded. He decided to withdraw, classically threatening Sherman's supply lines in his army's rear. Hood hoped his aggressiveness and the size of his still formidable force on-the-move would entice the Union troops to come forward against him, if only to protect their rear supply lines. The Union did not do so. McPherson's army closed in upon Decatur, Georgia, to the east side of Atlanta.

== Opposing forces ==
Sherman's forces in the Atlanta campaign included three armies: the Army of the Tennessee under Major General James B. McPherson (until he was killed at the Battle of Atlanta); the Army of the Cumberland under Major General George H. Thomas and the small Army of the Ohio (including only the XXIII Corps and a few small units) under Major General John M. Schofield. After McPherson's death, the Army of the Tennessee was commanded at the Battle of Atlanta by Major General John A. Logan The Army of the Tennessee comprised the XV Corps initially under the command of Logan, then under the command of Brigadier General Morgan L. Smith; the XVI Corps under the command of Major General Grenville M. Dodge, and the XVII Corps under the command of Major General Frank P. Blair Jr.

The Confederate Army of Tennessee was commanded by General Joseph E. Johnston until July 17, 1864, when he was replaced by Lieutenant General John B. Hood. At the start of the campaign, the Army of Tennessee comprised three infantry corps under the command Lieutenant Generals William J. Hardee, Leonidas Polk and John B. Hood, and a cavalry corps under Major General Joseph Wheeler. (Note: Polk's force also was known as the Army of Mississippi, Eicher, 2001, p. 696.) After Polk was killed on June 14, he was replaced in corps command by Major General William Wing Loring temporarily and on July 7 by Lieutenant General Alexander P. Stewart. (Note: At the start of the campaign, Sherman's armies had 254 cannons; Johnston's forces had 144 cannons. Castel, 1992, p. 115.)

Many, but not all, of the units of both armies fought in the Battle of Atlanta and related action at Decatur on July 22, 1864. (Note: See the separate order of battle articles.)

== Battle ==
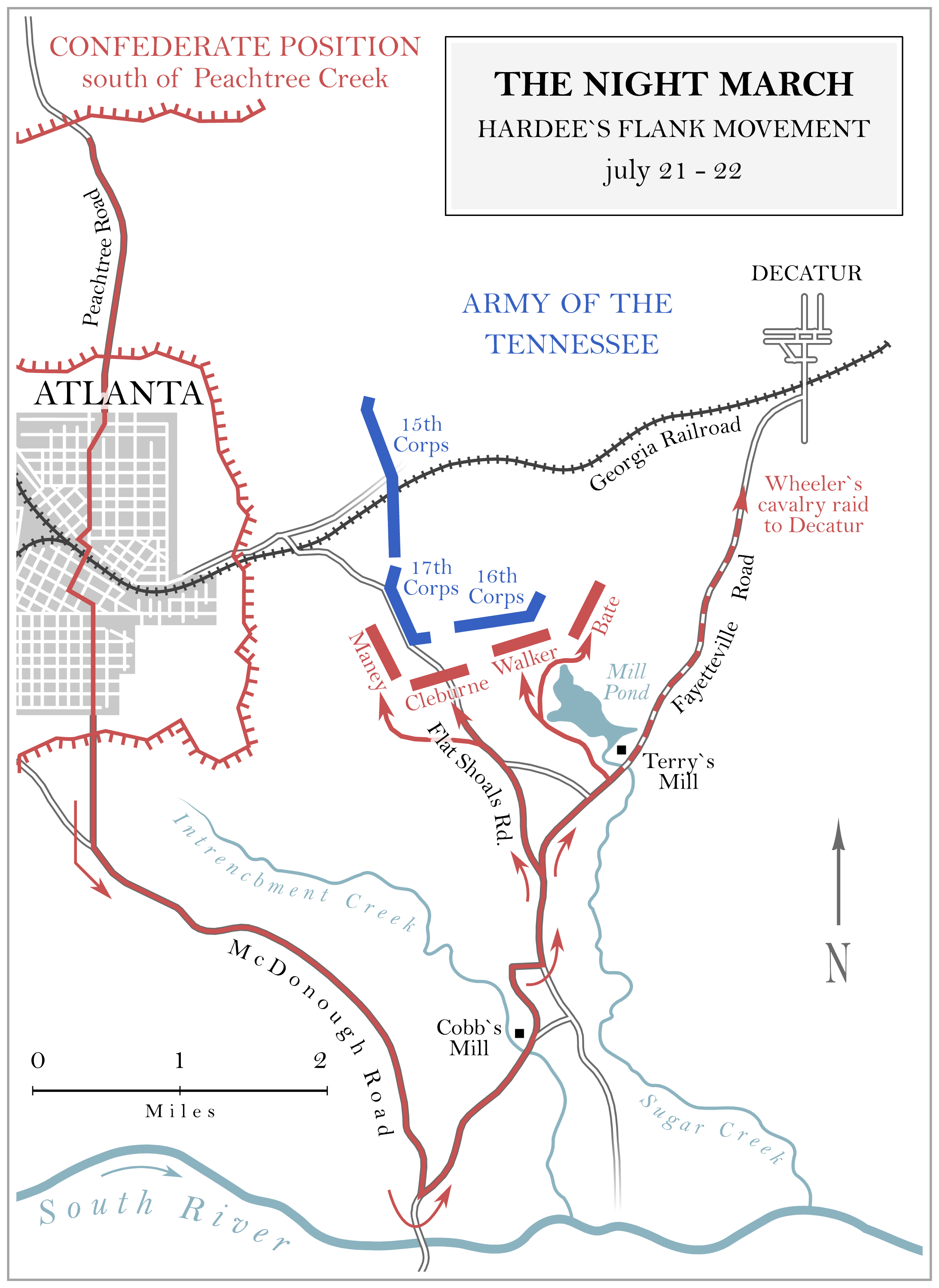
Hardee's flank march

Hood ordered Lieutenant General William J. Hardee's corps on a march around the Union left flank, had Major General Joseph Wheeler's cavalry march near Sherman's supply line, and had Major General Benjamin Cheatham's corps attack the Union front. However, it took longer than expected for Hardee to get his men into position. Confederate Major General William H. T. Walker was shot from his horse and killed by a Union sharpshooter while scouting the front to prepare his forces for battle. During the time that Hardee's corps was deploying for an attack, McPherson had correctly deduced a possible threat to his left flank. He sent XVI Corps, his reserve, to help strengthen the position. Hardee's men met this other force, and the battle began. About this time, McPherson rode to the front with two aides to determine the situation and redeploy some regiments as gunfire continued to build to the south of his line. While on this reconnaissance, McPherson was shot and killed by Confederate infantry unexpectedly moving forward. When the Confederates called on him to halt, he turned his horse and tried to escape after refusing a demand to surrender.

Although the initial Confederate attack was repulsed, the Union left flank began to retreat under heavy pressure. Initially, Hardee's column took the Flat Shoals Road toward McPherson's position. Union troops under Brigadier General Mortimer D. Leggett, commanding the 3rd Division of the XVII Corps moved back from the road and swung to a more east- west position to fill a gap between Blair's corp and Dodge's corp and defend Bald Hill. The main lines of battle now formed an "L" shape, with Hardee's attack forming the lower part of the "L," and Cheatham's attack on the Union front as the vertical member of the "L". Hood intended to attack the Union troops from both east and west. The fighting centered on a hill east of the city known as Bald Hill. The Federals had arrived two days earlier, and began to shell the city proper, killing several civilians. A savage struggle, sometimes hand-to-hand, developed around the hill, lasting until just after dark. The Federals held the hill while the Confederates retired to a point just south of there.

Meanwhile, two miles to the north, Cheatham's troops had broken through the Union lines at the Georgia railroad. In response, twenty artillery pieces were positioned on a small knoll near Sherman's headquarters and shelled the Confederates, while Logan's XV Corps regrouped and repulsed the Southern troops.

In a separate action near Decatur, Colonel John W. Sprague, in command of the 2nd Brigade, 4th Division of the XVI Corps, was attacked by Wheeler's cavalry. Wheeler had taken the Fayetteville Road and moved into the town of Decatur. Union troops fell back from the town while successfully protecting the ordnance and supply trains of the XV, XVI, XVII, and XX corps. Sprague received some reinforcements but Wheeler withdrew due to being recalled by Hardee three times in quick succession at about 5:00 p.m. to help in Hardee's attack on Bald Hill. Sprague was later awarded the Medal of Honor for his actions.

The Union had suffered over 3,700 casualties, including Major General McPherson, while the Confederate casualties numbered about 5,500. This was a heavy loss for the already reduced Confederate Army, but they still held the city.

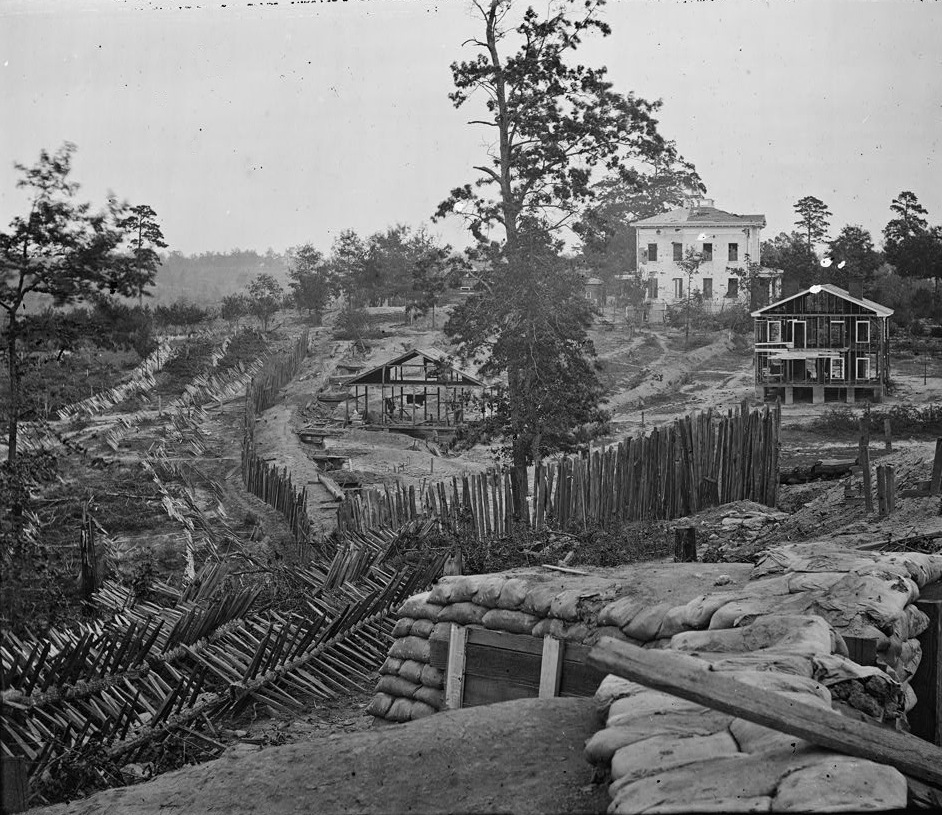
Palisades and chevaux de frise in front of the Potter (or Pondor) House, Atlanta, Georgia, 1864

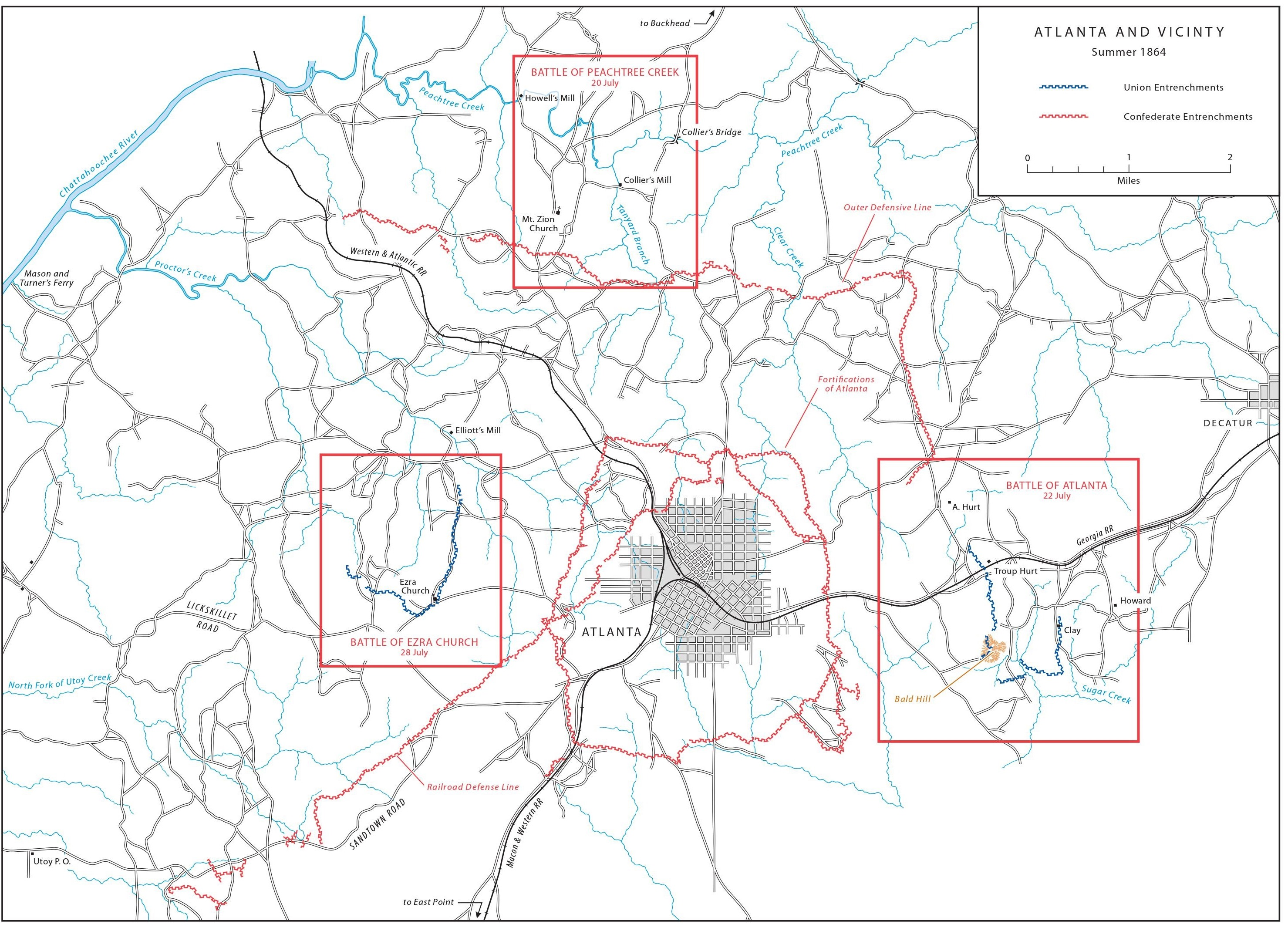
Atlanta Campaign: Atlanta and Vicinity (Summer 1864).

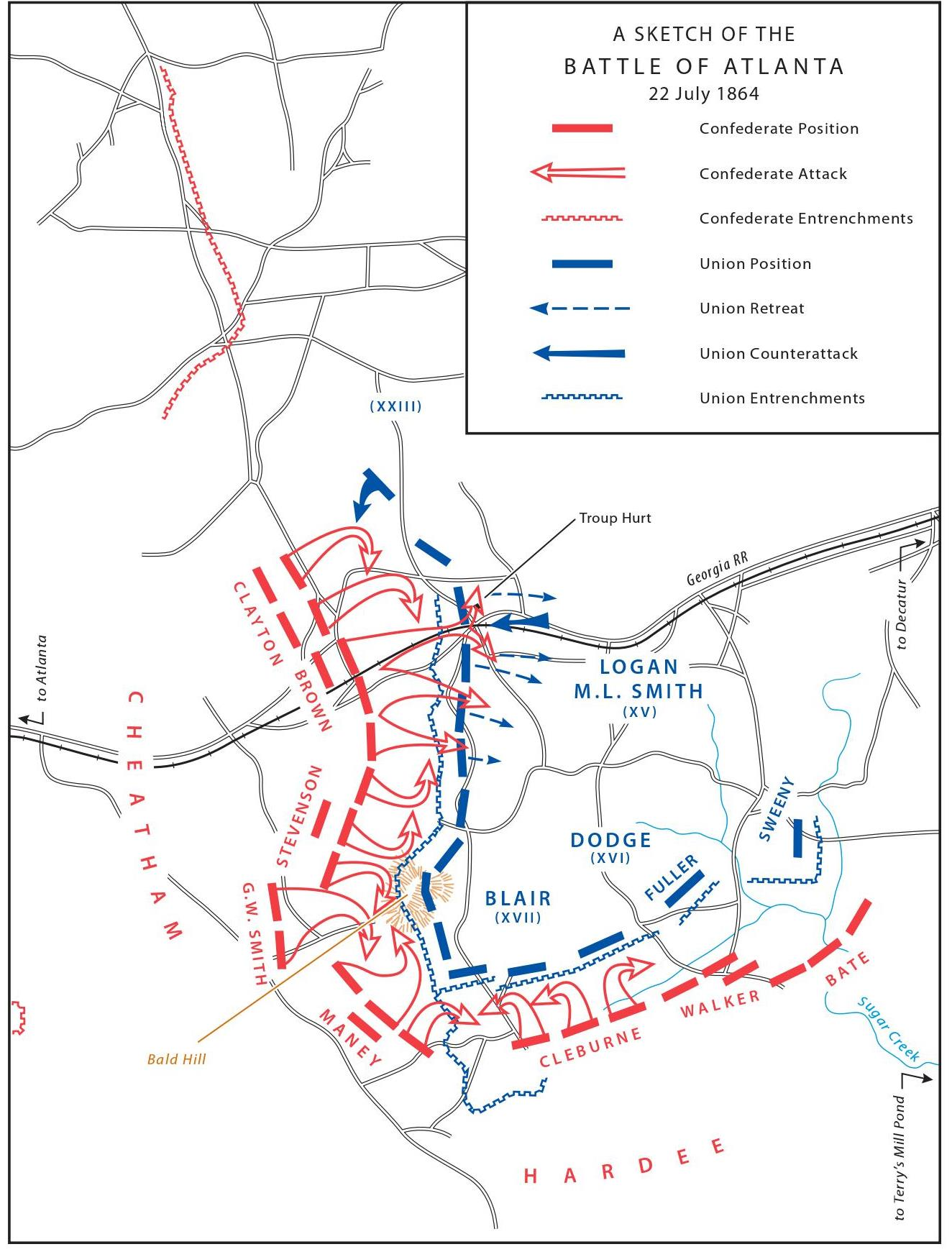
A sketch of the Battle of Atlanta, July 22, 1864.

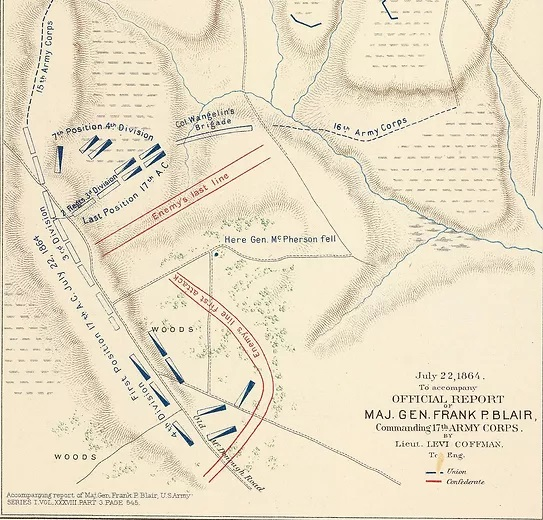
Positions of the 17th Army Corps, July 22, 1864.

Battle of Atlanta, GA., July 22, 1864

== Aftermath ==
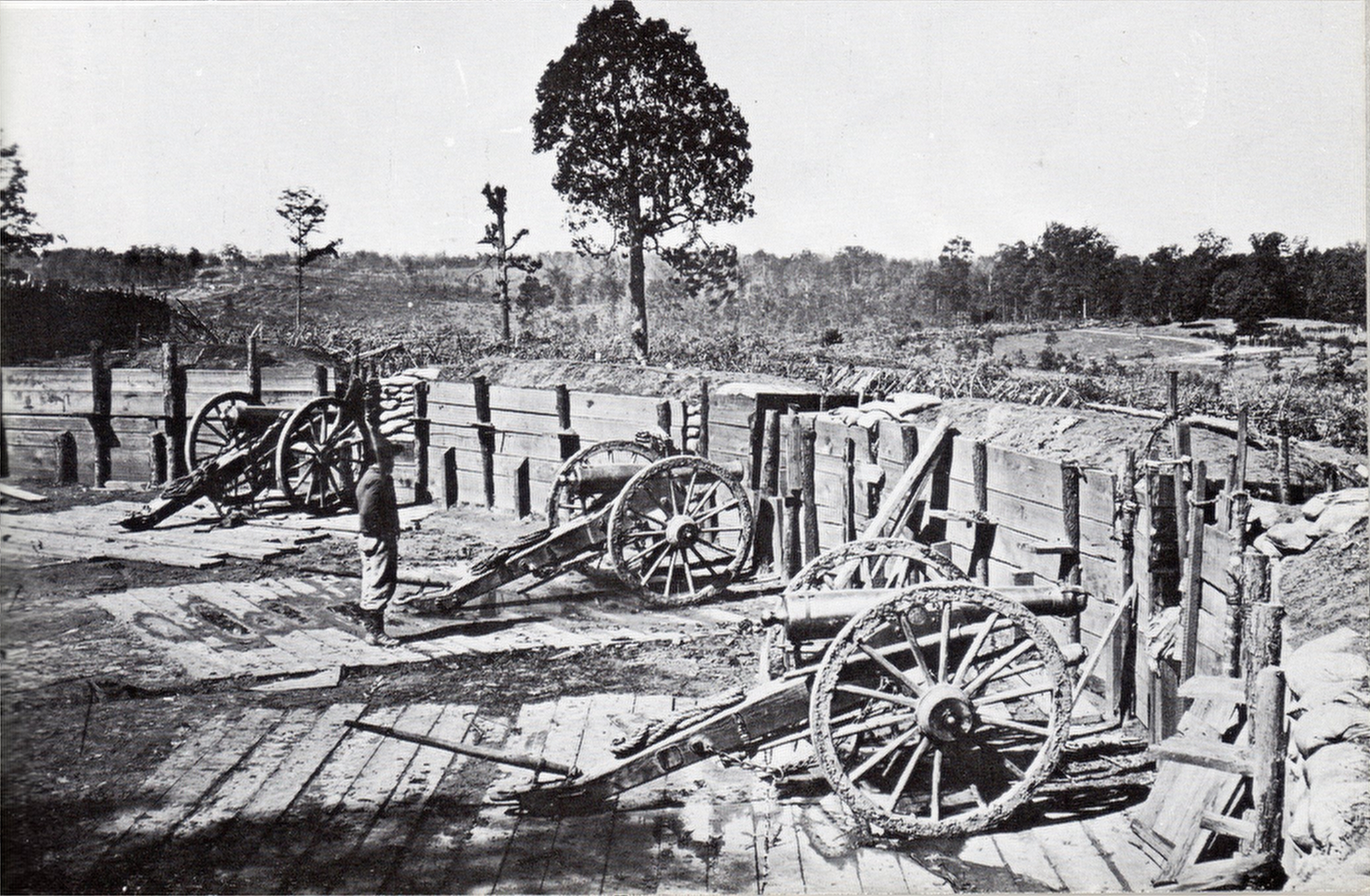
Confederate sappers constructed a number of artillery emplacements covering the avenues of approach to Atlanta. The artillery in this fortification overlooks Peachtree Street.

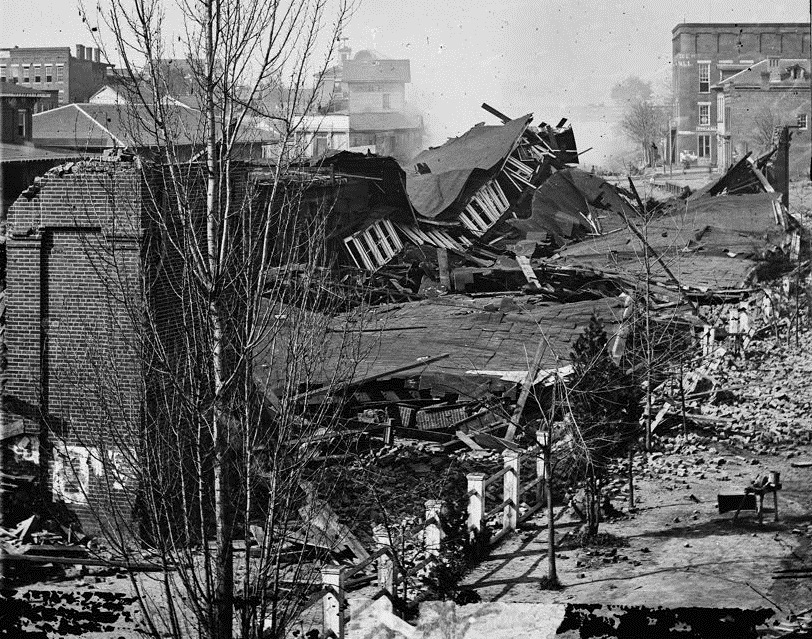
Ruins of Atlanta Union Depot after burning by Sherman's troops, 1864

Sherman settled into a siege of Atlanta, shelling the city and sending raids west and south of the city to cut off the supply lines from Macon, Georgia. Both of Sherman's cavalry raids including McCook's raid and Stoneman's Raid were defeated by Confederate cavalry collectively under General Wheeler. Although the raids partially achieved their objective of cutting railroad tracks and destroying supply wagons, they were soon after repaired and supplies continued to move to the city of Atlanta. Following the failure to break the Confederates' hold on the city, Sherman began to employ a new strategy. He swung his entire army in a broad flanking maneuver to the west. Finally, on August 31, at Jonesborough, Georgia, Sherman's army captured the railroad track from Macon, pushing the Confederates to Lovejoy's Station. With his supply lines fully severed, Hood pulled his troops out of Atlanta the next day, September 1, destroying supply depots as he left to prevent them from falling into Union hands. He also set fire to eighty-one loaded ammunition cars, which led to a conflagration watched by hundreds.

On September 2, Mayor James Calhoun, along with a committee of Union-leaning citizens including William Markham, Jonathan Norcross, and Edward Rawson, met a captain on the staff of Major General Henry W. Slocum, and surrendered the city, asking for "protection to non-combatants and private property". Sherman, who was in Jonesboro at the time of surrender, sent a telegram to Washington on September 3, reading, "Atlanta is ours, and fairly won".

Within a week of the fall of Atlanta, Sherman had ordered all non-military personnel out of Atlanta. Reportedly he remembered the cities of Memphis and Vicksburg which became a burden immediately after victory, so he told the civilians specifically to go north or go south. A truce of sorts was quickly established at a town nearby called Rough And Ready with General Hood, where Union and Confederate prisoners were in small numbers exchanged and civilians wishing to go south could get help to that end. After the battle, Sherman established his headquarters in Atlanta on September 7. He stayed until November 15 when the Army of the Tennessee, then commanded by Major General Oliver O. Howard and consisting of two corps and the newly formed Army of Georgia, commanded by Major General Henry W. Slocum, also with two corps, departed for Savannah on the campaign known as "Sherman's March to the Sea".

Despite the damage caused by the war, Atlanta recovered from its downfall relatively quickly; as one observer noted as early as November 1865, "A new city is springing up with marvelous rapidity".

== Political ramifications ==
The fall of Atlanta and the success of the overall Atlanta campaign were extensively covered by Northern newspapers, and were a boon to Northern morale and to President Lincoln's political standing. In the 1864 election, Democratic challenger George B. McClellan ran against Lincoln. McClellan ran a conflicted campaign: McClellan was a Unionist who advocated continuing the war until the defeat of the Confederacy, but the Democratic platform included calls for negotiations with the Confederacy on the subject of a potential truce. The capture of Atlanta and Hood's burning of military facilities as he evacuated showed that a successful conclusion of the war was in sight, weakening support for a truce. As a result, Lincoln was re-elected by a wide margin, with 212 out of 233 electoral votes.

== Legacy ==
In 1880, Atlanta ranked among the fifty largest cities in the United States. The battlefield is now urban, residential, and commercial land, with many markers memorializing notable events of the battle, including McPherson's place of death. The marker was erected in 1956 by the Georgia Historical Commission. To commemorate the 140th anniversary of the battle, in 2004, two new markers were erected in the Inman Park neighborhood. The Atlanta Cyclorama building, built in 1921 and listed on the National Register of Historic Places, is located in Grant Park and formerly contained a panoramic painting of the battle. In 2014, the City of Atlanta sold the Battle of Atlanta Cyclorama to Atlanta History Center. Atlanta History Center constructed new, purpose-built building at their Buckhead Campus to house the art piece. The painting itself underwent an extensive restoration to reverse changes made to the original painting in the 1890s. The Cyclorama and accompanying exhibition (Cyclorama: The Big Picture) opened at Atlanta History Center on February 22, 2019.

One notable establishment destroyed by Union soldiers was the Potter (or Ponder) House, built in 1857, and owned by Ephraim G. Ponder, a holder of 65 slaves before the war. In the battle, it was used by Confederate sharpshooters until Union artillery inflicted heavy damage. It was never rebuilt. One of Ponder's slaves, Festus Flipper, was the father of Henry Ossian Flipper, who later became the first African American cadet to graduate from the United States Military Academy at West Point.

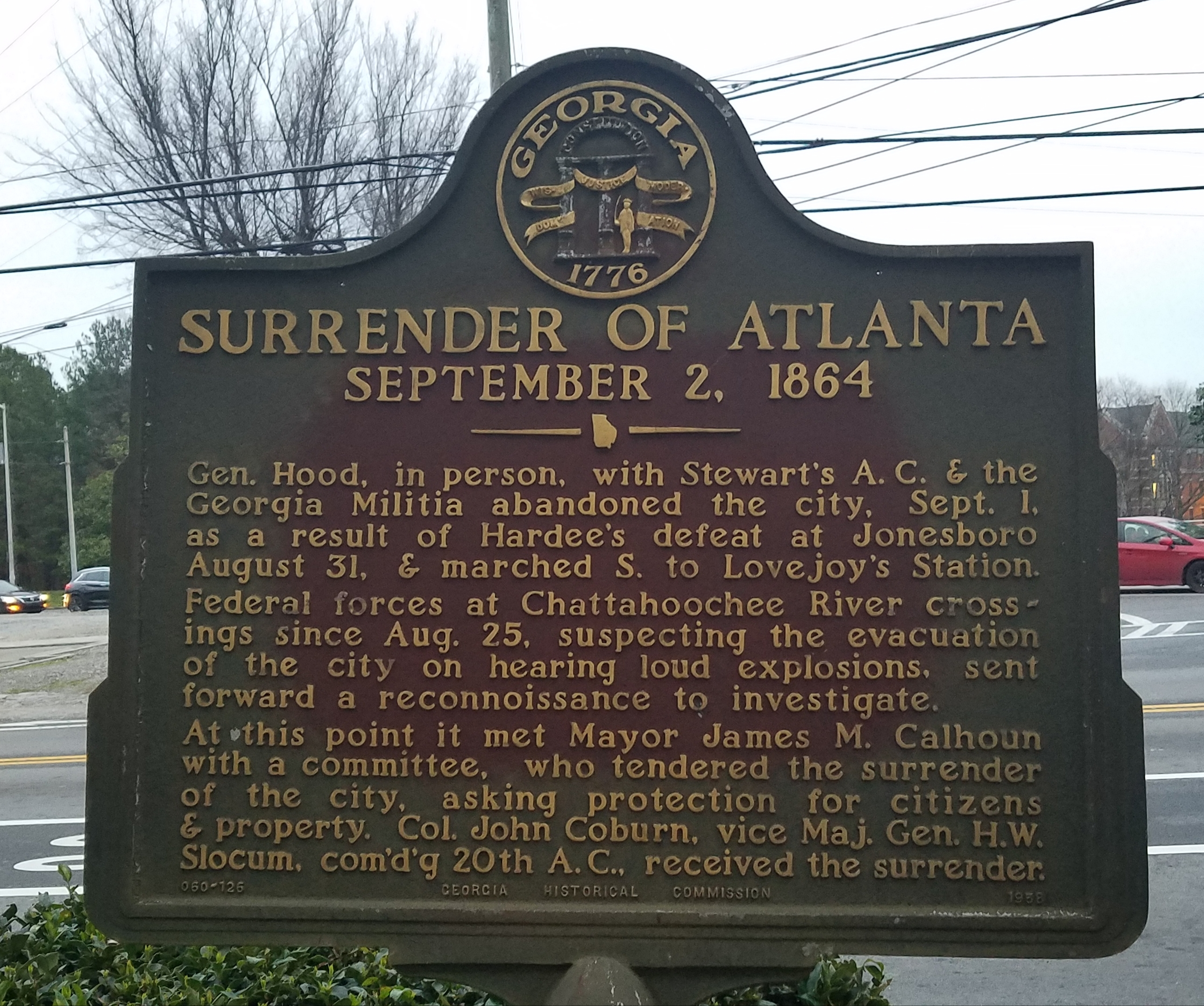
Georgia Historical Marker for the surrender of Atlanta

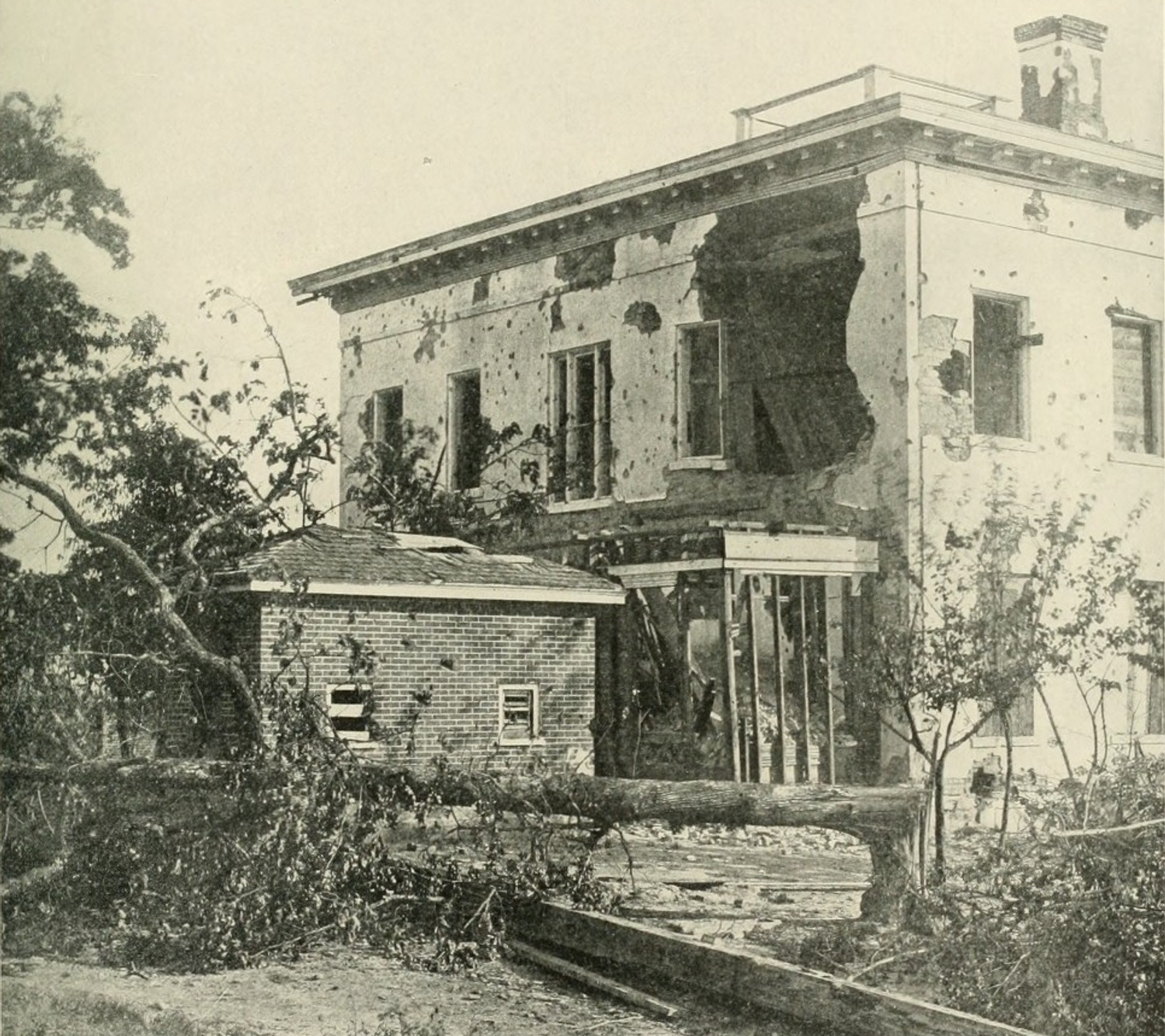
The Potter (or Ponder) House in Atlanta housed Confederate sharpshooters until Union artillery made a special target of it

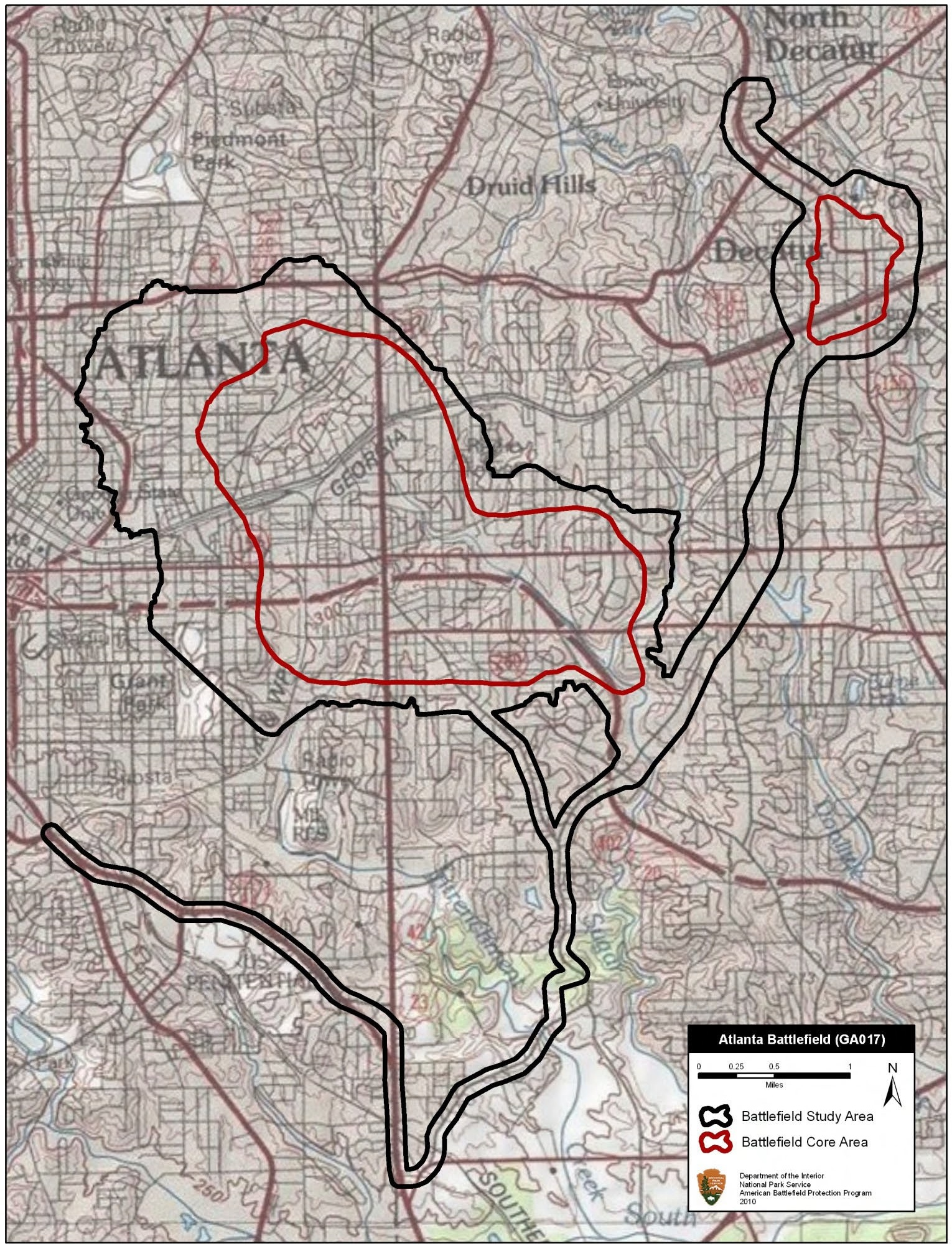
Map of Atlanta battlefield core and study areas by the American Battlefield Protection Program
