= Richard Rawson (disambiguation) =

Richard Rawson (born 1987), known as Fazer, is a British musician.

Richard Rawson may also refer to:

- Richard Rawson (fl. 1475–1485), father of John Rawson, 1st Viscount Clontarf
- Richard Rawson, a Sheriff of London in 1477
- Richard Rawson (priest) (died 1543), brother of John Rawson
- Richard Hamilton Rawson (1863–1918), British Army officer and politician
