= Rawson =

Rawson may refer to:

== Places ==
Argentina

- Rawson, Chubut, the capital of Chubut Province
- Rawson Department, Chubut
- Rawson Department, San Juan
  - Villa Krause, also named Rawson, the capital city of the department

Australia

- Rawson, Victoria

United States

- Rawson, North Dakota
- Rawson, Ohio

== Other uses ==
- Rawson (surname)
- Rawson Stakes, a horse race in Australia
- a barley variety
- a boarding house at Cranbrook School in Sydney, Australia
