= Patrick White (judge) =

Irish politician and judge

Sir Patrick White (c. 1480-1561) was an Irish politician, landowner and judge, who was notable for his forty-year tenure on the Irish Bench, much of which was spent as second Baron of the Court of Exchequer (Ireland). He founded a dynasty who were Lords of the Manor of Dufferin, County Down, for several generations, although they were forced to abandon Dufferin for some years due to local disturbances. His younger son Rowland was a writer on political issues who had considerable influence in his own time.

== Career ==
He was born in Flemington, near Navan in County Meath. He is said to have come from a long-established landowning family, with connections to Dufferin in County Down, though little is known of his parents or his early life. He was appointed a Baron of the Exchequer in 1521, and apart from a short period on the Court of King's Bench (Ireland), he served on the Court of Exchequer until his death. He held office at the pleasure of the monarch, and his patent was renewed at regular intervals. He was one of the original lessees of the King's Inns in 1541.

He became a member of the Privy Council of Ireland in 1533, and was knighted. John Rawson, the last Prior of the Order of St. John of Jerusalem at Kilmainham, and later Viscount Clontarf, was one of the handful of men who dominated the Privy Council: White is known to have been close to him, and married his younger son Rowland to Rawson's natural daughter Catherine, a marriage which is said to have greatly increased the White family fortunes. Like most of his fellow judges he was enriched by the Dissolution of the Monasteries; he obtained lands at Clontarf which had belonged to the Order of St John (which was dissolved in 1541), possibly at Lord Clontarf's suggestion. He also held lands at Rathsallagh in County Wicklow, had extensive landholdings in Meath, and became lord of the manor of Dufferin in County Down. He died in 1561, while still serving on the Court of Exchequer. His son Rowland was a Protestant convert, and a sincere if unorthodox religious reformer, who was regarded with suspicion by the Catholic Queen Mary I. Patrick on the other hand seems to have adhered to the Roman Catholic faith, even in his last years when the Protestant Elizabeth I was on the throne.

== Family ==
He married twice: little is known of his first wife. His second wife was Alison St Lawrence, daughter of Nicholas St Lawrence, 4th Baron Howth by his third wife Alison Fitzsimon, and widow of John Netterville. He had at least three children:

- Nicholas (died c.1566), of Flemington, his eldest son and heir, who had at least one son Patrick;
- Rowland, of Dufferin, who married Catherine Rawson, natural daughter of Viscount Clontarf, who brought him a very large dowry, which he used to build up a successful business. He played a leading role in Ulster politics in the 1560s, and was the author of several influential treatises, including "Discourse touching Ireland" (c.1569) and "The Disorders of the Irishry" (c.1571). He died of the plague in 1572, leaving a son and heir, John, who bought Dufferin from his cousin Patrick, son of Nicholas, and sold it to James Hamilton, 1st Viscount Clandeboye in about 1606;
- Margaret, who married Walter Forster, alderman of Dublin, and had one surviving daughter, also called Margaret.
