= Rowland White (Irish writer) =

Rowland White (died 1572) was a sixteenth-century Irish writer and political and religious reformer, whose writings had considerable influence in his own lifetime.

== Family ==
He was the second son of Patrick White, Baron of the Court of Exchequer (Ireland). His mother was Patrick's second wife Alison St. Lawrence, daughter of Nicholas St Lawrence, 4th Baron Howth and his third wife Alison Fitzsimon, and widow of John Netterville of Dowth. He was probably born at Flemington, near Navan, County Meath, where his father had his main residence, although the Whites also had a long-standing claim, which Rowland later revived, to the barony of Dufferin in County Down. Little is known of his early life. By the 1540s he was a flourishing merchant with his main centre of business in Dublin.

== Merchant ==
He married Catherine Rawson, natural daughter of John Rawson, 1st Viscount Clontarf, former Prior of Kilmainham and a close political associate of his father, by an unknown mother (Rawson, though he was in holy orders, evidently did not take his vow of celibacy seriously and had several children out of wedlock). The marriage is said to have brought Rowland considerable wealth, and substantial assets at home and in Flanders, Spain and Germany. On a business trip to Flanders, he met the leading financier Sir Thomas Gresham, who sponsored him for membership of the London Mercers Company. However, in his own words, "fortune brought me down by the seas and otherways". Rowland suffered heavy financial losses, and he was imprisoned for debt in Ludgate debtors' prison for 3 years. On his release he returned to Ireland and successfully renewed the family claim to Dufferin. He was living there by 1570, after the heirs of his elder brother Nicholas, who died in 1566, ceded their claims to him (his father had died in 1561). Dufferin is centred on the town of Killyleagh.

In 1571 he was exploring the possibility of mining on Lambay Island off the coast of North County Dublin, no doubt with the encouragement of John Challoner, the owner, who attempted to develop gold and silver mines on Lambay.

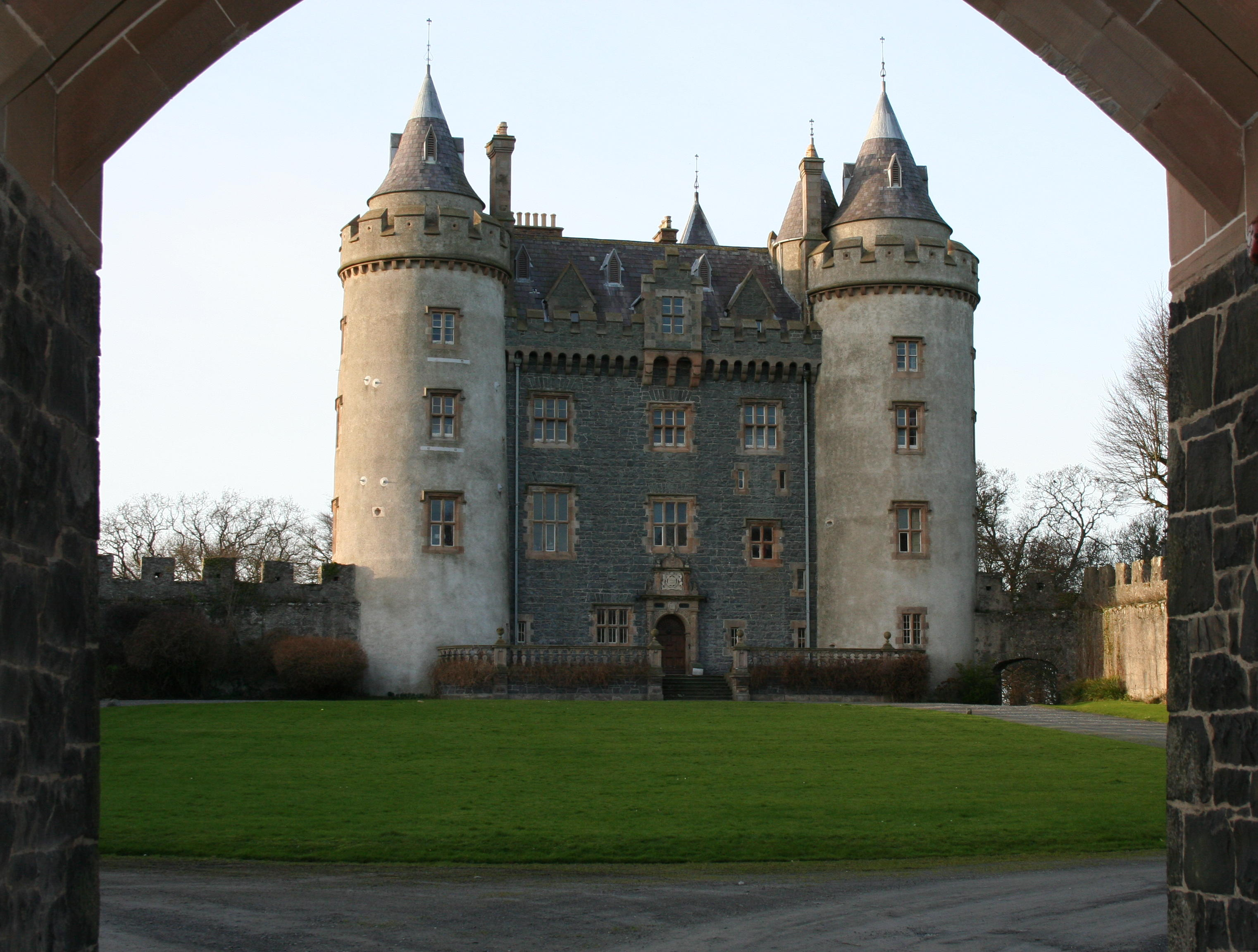
Killyleagh Castle, from the gatehouse: the Castle was built by the Hamilton family after they bought Dufferin from Rowland White's son John about 1606

== Reformer ==
He had a keen interest in political reform, and in the 1560s he wrote three treatises on the governance of Ireland, all of which are now lost. His treatises aroused the favourable interest of William Cecil, 1st Baron Burghley, chief minister to Elizabeth I, who invited him to England to discuss them. Rowland was unable to travel, but was encouraged to write two further works between 1569 and 1571, A Discors (discourse) Touching Ireland and The Disorders of the Irishry. He was invited to England to meet Cecil again: apparently he did not do so, but he renewed his friendship with Gresham and made the acquaintance of Sir Thomas Smith, the Secretary of State, who had a keen interest in the colonisation of Ireland, and had recently made an unsuccessful attempt to settle the Ards peninsula.

== Death and legacy ==
Rowland died of bubonic plague in England in September 1572. He had several children by his wife Catherine Rawson, including John, the eldest son, who was placed under Sir Thomas Smith's guardianship. John retained possession of Dufferin until he sold it to the Hamilton family of Clandeboye in about 1606. The Hamiltons subsequently built Killyleagh Castle in its present form.

== Writings ==
Rowland, son of a Catholic father, was a convert to the Protestant faith, and a sincere if unorthodox religious reformer, who was in disfavour with the ardently Roman Catholic Queen Mary I as a result. He believed that the Protestant faith was not a recent import to Ireland, but on the contrary that it represented Christianity in its pure and original state before it became corrupted by Catholic doctrine. Such views were not shared even by most Irish Protestants and were anathema to the devoutly Catholic Queen.

His political treatises are written from the point of view of the English colonist. He regarded Gaelic civilisation as barbarous, and the people living in a state of wretched poverty, "with nothing left to cherish or care for", although he thought the Irish people would become good citizens if they were governed properly. Good government was the key to his programme of reform, including the introduction of the common law to the whole of Ireland: hitherto, he wrote rather obscurely, the Irish, having lacked the benefits of a proper system of law could not "live lawfully". Like nearly all the Anglo-Irish gentry, he objected strongly to the cess, the tax imposed on the towns for the upkeep of military garrisons, and drew the wider lesson that Ireland could not flourish under military rule. He also believed that the cooperation of his own class was essential to any programme of reform. His complaints about undue exactions and excessive interference by local officials reflect his personal quarrel with William Piers, the Governor and Constable of Carrickfergus.

Rowland has been dismissed in modern times as an unscrupulous adventurer, but his writings had considerable influence in his own time.

== Sources ==
- Ball, F. Elrington The Judges in Ireland 1221-1921 London John Murray 1926
- Barry, Judy "White, Rowland" Cambridge Dictionary of Irish Biography 2009
- Hower, Jessica S. Tudor Empire: The Making of Early Modern Britain and the British Atlantic World, 1485-1603 Palgrave Macmillan 2020
- National Library of Scotland Histories of Scottish Families "Hamilton Manuscripts" p. 58
- O'Laverty, James "The Barony of Dufferin": An Historical Account of the Diocese of Down and Connor, Ancient and Modern Vol.1 (1878)
- Sheridan, James "An Irishman's Diary": On the opportunistic Rowland White and 16th-century Ulster Irish Times 9/11/2016
