= Rebecca Rawson =

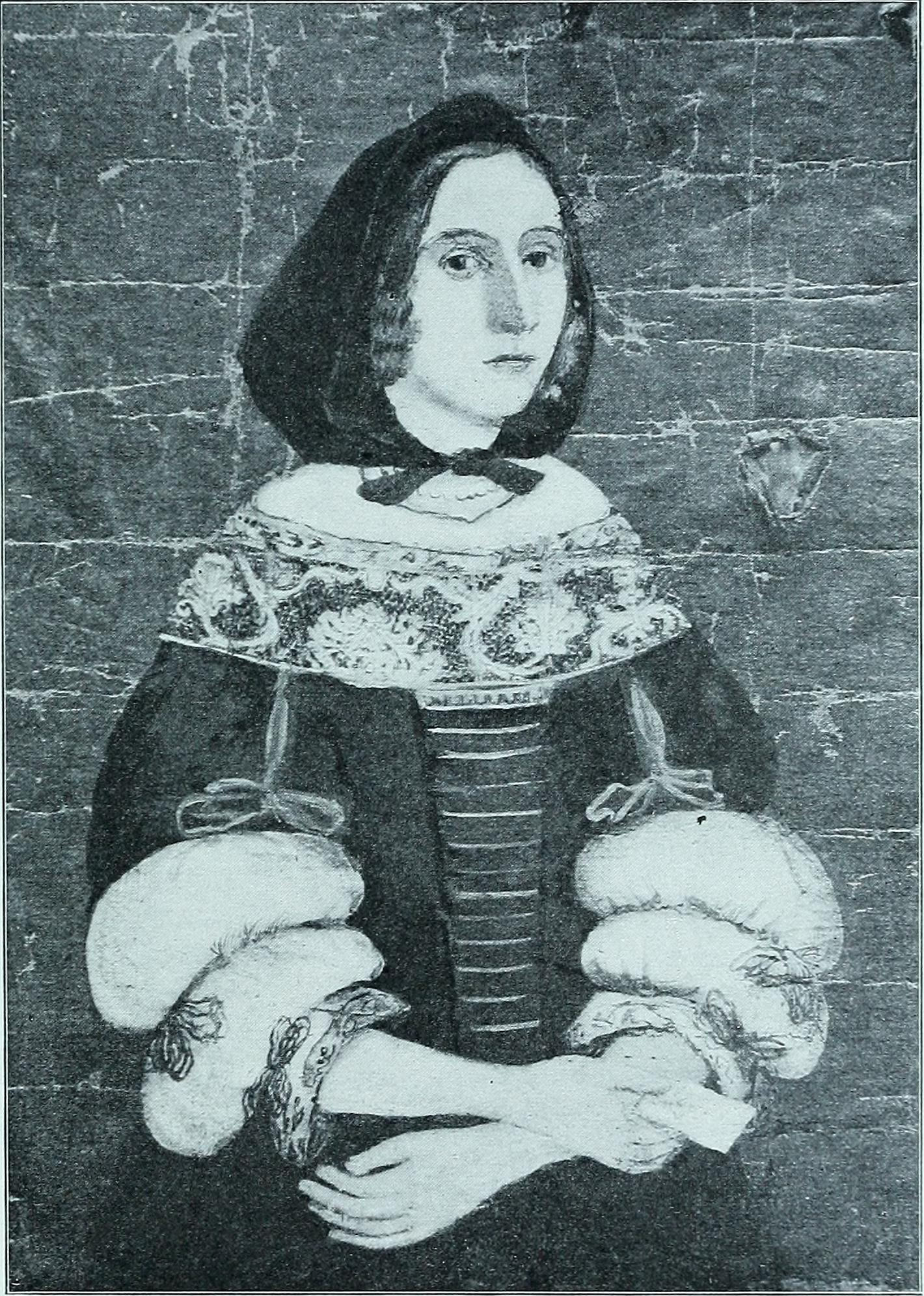
Portrait of Rebecca Rawson by the Freake-Gibbs Painter

Rebecca Rawson (May 23, 1656, Massachusetts - June 7-June 9, 1692, near Port Royal, Jamaica) was the heroine of the 1849 book Leaves from Margaret Smith's Journal, in the Province of Massachusetts Bay (by John G. Whittier).

Rawson was born in 1656 in Newbury, Massachusetts to Edward and Rachel Rawson. Rebecca was the couple's ninth child. Her father went on to become Secretary of the Massachusetts Bay Colony. Rawson was considered "one of the most beautiful, polite and accomplished young ladies in Boston."

In July 1679, Rawson married Thomas Hale who claimed to be nephew of the Lord Chief Justice in England. With her considerable dowry, the couple set sail for England.

When the boat docked in London, the newlyweds disembarked, leaving their luggage aboard the ship. The next morning Thomas went to retrieve their trunks. The trunks soon arrived, but with no keys to open them. Thomas did not reappear, Rebecca had the locks forced and discovered the trunks were emptied of any valuables.

Thomas Hale, she soon discovered, was Thomas Rumsey and he had left London to see his wife in Kent.

Embarrassed, penniless, and pregnant, Rebecca decided to stay in London. For 13 years she supported herself and her son as an artist and handywoman. Her skills included painting on glass.

Eventually, Rebecca agreed to return to Boston. She set sail, first for Port Royal in Jamaica, and from there she planned to return to New England. Rebecca’s ship arrived in June 1692 and was in port when the 1692 Jamaica earthquake struck. The earthquake killed 2,000 of the 6,500 people in Port Royal. Rebecca Rawson died in the earthquake at age 36. The New England Historic Genealogical Society in Boston has a 1670 portrait of Rebecca by the Freake Painter in its collection.
