= Kilteel =

Village in County Kildare, Ireland

Kilteel Cill Chéile
- Village
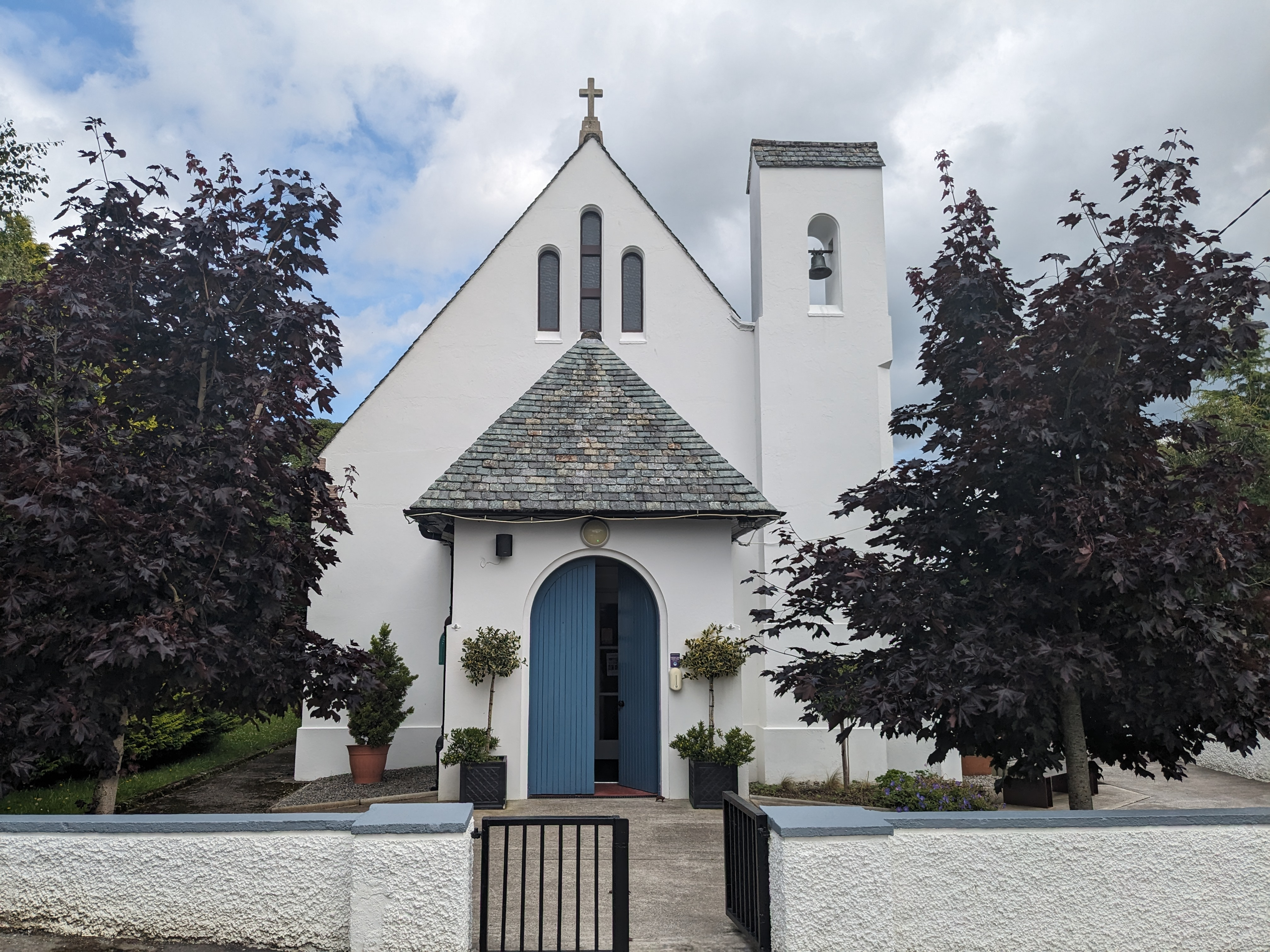

- Location within Ireland
- Coordinates: 53°14′06″N 6°31′26″W
- Province: Leinster
- County: County Kildare
- Elevation: 243.8 m (800 ft)

Population (2022)
  - Total: 262
- Time zone: UTC+0 (WET)
  - Summer (DST): UTC-1 (IST (WEST))

Historical population
Year	Pop.	±%
1841	923	—
1851	676	−26.8%
1871	477	−29.4%
1901	268	−43.8%
1951	181	−32.5%
2002	483	+166.9%
2022	262	−45.8%

Kilteel (Irish: Cill Chéile) is the name of a village, townland and civil parish located in the barony of South Salt, County Kildare, Ireland. The townland of Kilteel Upper contains the remains of a church with a decorated Romanesque chancel arch, the ruins of a 13th-century preceptory of the Knights Hospitaller and a well-preserved 15th-century tower house. The historic settlement is located on the southwest corner of the English Pale and served an important function as a border fortress during the medieval period.

== Geography ==
The village of Kilteel lies on a low northeast-southwest ridge at the western edge of the Wicklow Mountains. It is near the County Dublin border, around 10 kilometres (6 mi) east of Naas and 20 kilometres (12 mi) south-west of Dublin city centre.

=== Parish ===
The civil parish of 3437 statute acres contains the following townlands:

Townland	Acreage	Irish Name	Earliest record of placename or variant
Blackchurch	229	-	1654 - Blackchurch
Blackdown	151	-	1717 - Blackdown/Blackdown Fodeens
Coolahocka	119	-	1752 - Coolacaka
Cromwellstown	240	-	1518 - Crommaliston
Cupidstown	301	-	1690 - Cuppilstowne
Kilteel Lower	259	Cill Chéile	1179 - Cehcheli
Kilteel Upper	210	-	-
Kilwarden	364	-	1543 - Kilwarnyng
Newrow	70	-	-
Oldmiltown	165	-	1669 - Millfarm
Oldtown	21	-	1717 - Oldtown
Porterstown	98	-	1669 - Porters-farme
Rathbane	447	-	1752 - Rabane 1783 - Rathbane

The parish extends from the peak of Cupidstown Hill adjoining Kilbride parish in County Wicklow to the southeast, east to Cromwellstownhill where it borders Dublin County. To the north, west and south it borders with the parishes of Oughterard, Kill and Rathmore. The N7 road crosses the townland of Blackchurch at the northern extent of the parish.

== History ==
=== Prehistory and Early Medieval Period ===
The Record of Monuments and Places suggests that a prehistoric barrow on a hilltop within Kilteel Wood, northwest of the modern village functioned as an inauguration site. The barrow is marked as a substantial enclosure on Alexander Taylor's map of 1783 and is marked as a 'fort' on John Taylor's 1816 map.

In the Early Medieval period the adjacent centre of Rathmore was a stronghold of the Meic Bráenáin, a branch of the Fothairt Airthir Life. Kilteel was their principal church and was located within the Fothairt Airthir Life territory of Uí Máel Ruba or Uí Maíleruba. While multiple origins have been suggested for the placename, including Cill tSile and Cill tSiadhail, reflected in the varying spelling of the road signage, the Ordnance Survey Placenames Commission has adopted Cill Chéile or Cell Chéile, suggesting the original church was founded by Celé Crist, a bishop of the Cenél nEóġain who died in 727. The earliest written reference to the church is a papal letter of 1179, referring to the church of Cehcheli.

A second early Christian foundation, Kildronan or Cell Epscoip Drónáin may have been located within Cromwellstown townland. The townland name originates in a grant of lands in Kildronan by Maurice FitzGerald to the Cromhale family before 1257. The Priory of All Hallows attempted to recover the lands from Thomas de Cromhale in 1317.

An early medieval D-shaped enclosure was excavated in Blackchurch townland in 2004. The townland name Rathbane suggests the presence of an early medieval ringfort, and the principal house of the townland is marked as Whitefort on the 1838 Ordnance Survey map.

=== Medieval Period ===
==== Kilteel church ====
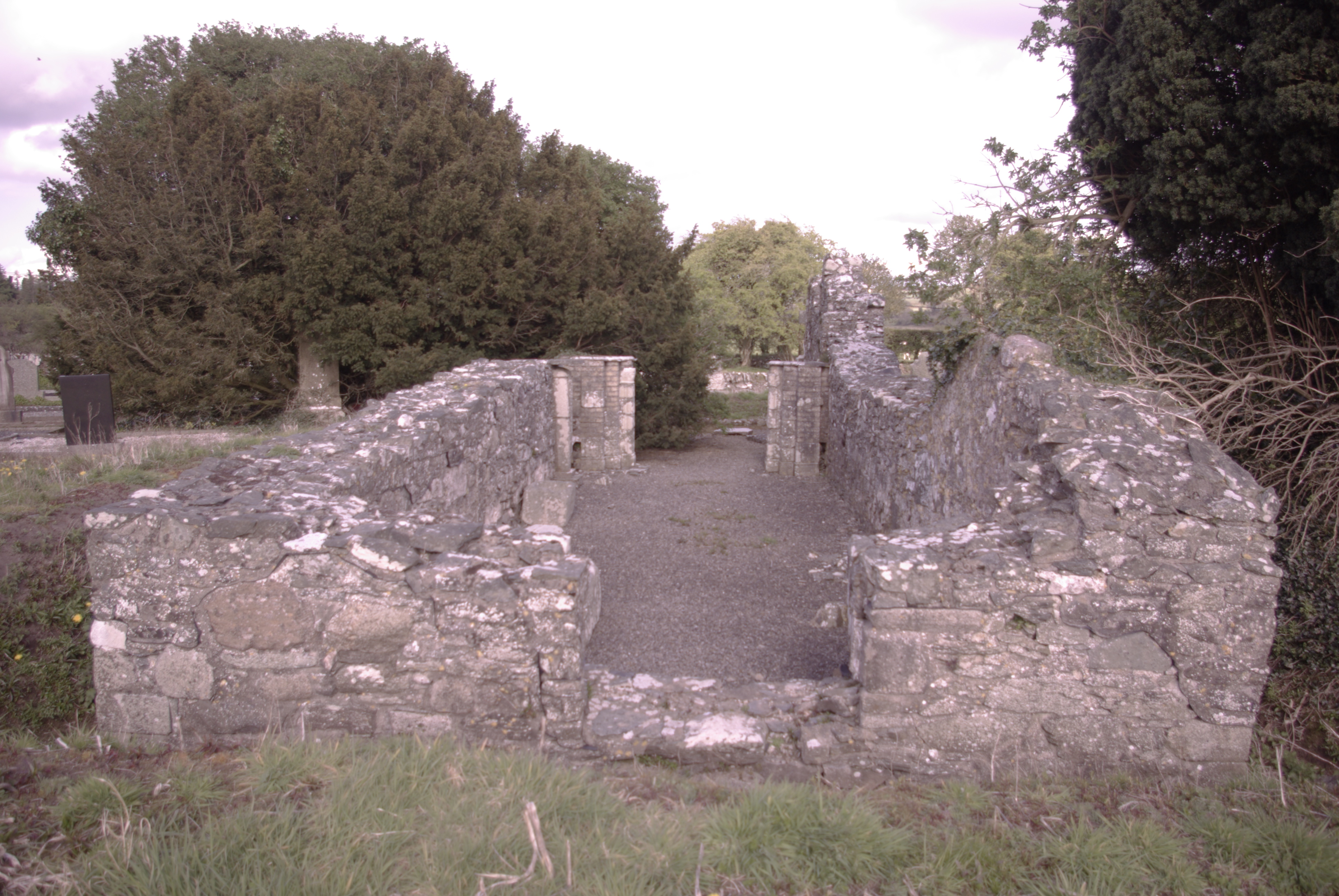
Kilteel Romansesque church

A ruined church southwest of the village contains the highly decorated remains of a Romanesque chancel arch or doorway. Excavations in 1977 and 1978 suggested the first church was a single-cell stone building built after 800 AD. The carved Romanesque figures may have been taken from a separate church and incorporated into the extant building during the construction of the preceptory in the 13th century. The 12th-century High Cross to the north may mark the site of the Romanesque church, possibly built under the patronage of Diarmait Mac Murchada, whose mother was of the Meic Bráenáin.

The later church, ruined in 1630 but restored later in the 17th century, had fallen into disuse again by the early 18th century, when Protestant services may have moved to the adjacent parish of Rathmore. In 1935 the decorated fragments of the chancel arch were recovered from a farmhouse adjoining the castle and reinstated by Harold Leask.

==== Hospitaller preceptory ====
The church and lands of Kilheile were in the possession of the Knights Hospitallers before 1212, but it is unclear when the preceptory was built; no foundation charter or original grant of land survives. James Ware described the preceptory as founded by Maurice FitzGerald, who died in 1257, while Kenneth Nicholls suggested it may have been founded by his father Gerard FitzMaurice who died in 1204. The prior of the preceptory is first referred to in the Justiciary Rolls of 1308. The preceptory was one of seventeen in Ireland and general chapters of the order were held there in 1326, 1333 and 1334, suggesting a substantial foundation. The remains include traces of a large sub-rectangular enclosure, 200 metres long and 150 metres wide, which may represent the original enceinte, a substantial gatehouse containing a guardroom and the ruins of a second gatehouse. A suit of armour was recovered from the ruins in the early 19th century.

==== Pale boundary ====
In the medieval period, Kilteel served as a border fortress on the marches of the English Pale, under attack from the Gaelic O'Byrne and O'Toole families of Wicklow. In 1355 Edward III issued letters requiring those appointed for the defence of the marches to take up their duties in the wards of Kilteel, Rathmore and Ballymore, noting the depredations and burnings of Obryn and his accomplices. An act of 1488 setting out the boundaries of the four obedient shires of Louth, Meath, Dublin and Kildare described the Pale boundary as passing through Kilteel and Rathmore. An act of 1494-5 required the boundary to consist of a double ditch of six feet high above the ground at one side or part which mireth next unto Irishman . A portion of the Pale boundary with traces of a possible earthen bastion is visible in aerial photographs southeast of the medieval church. Archaeological excavations suggest the denuded remains continue east, forming the boundary between the townlands of Kilteel Upper and Cupidstown.

==== Tower house ====
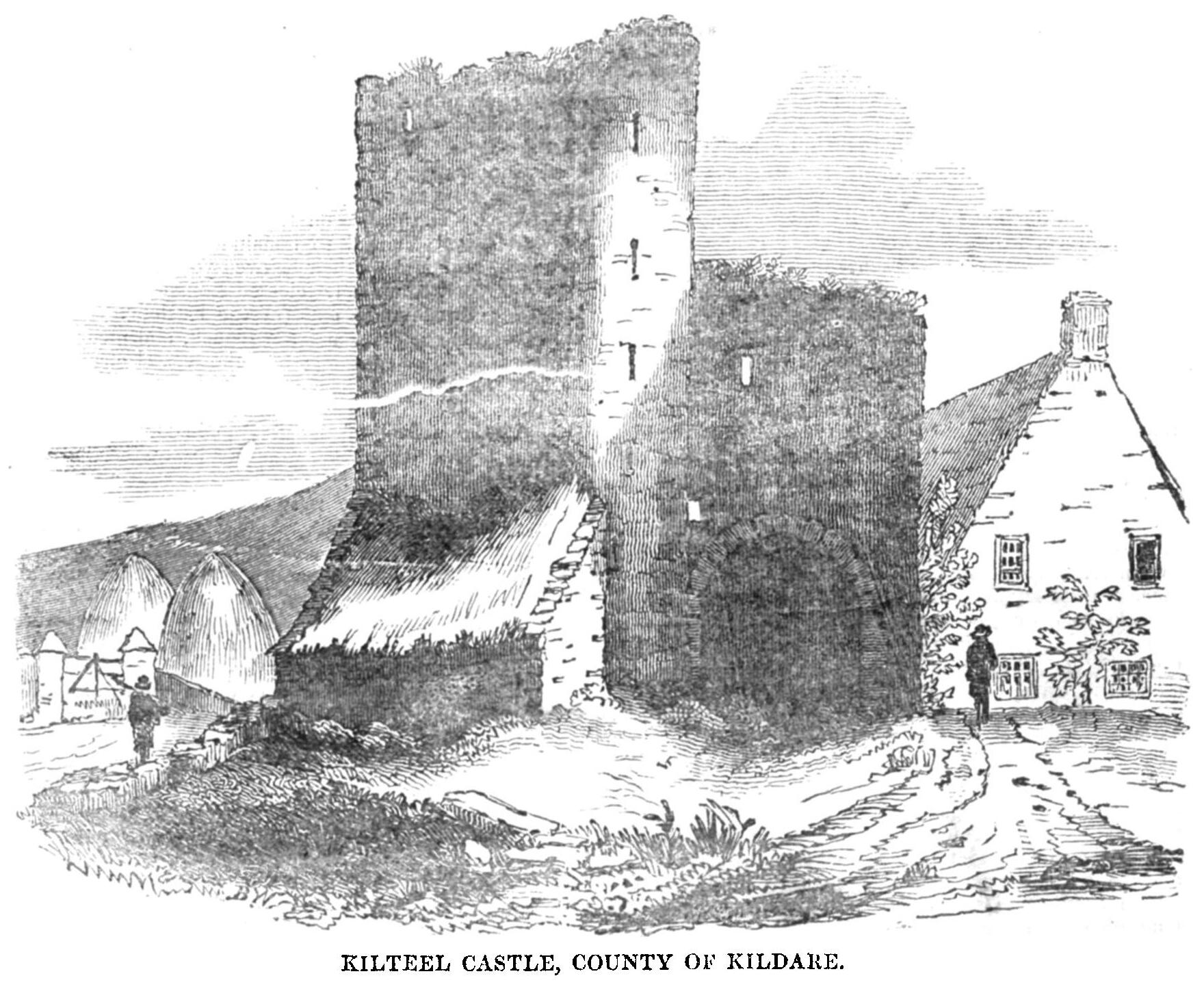
Kilteel Castle in 1833

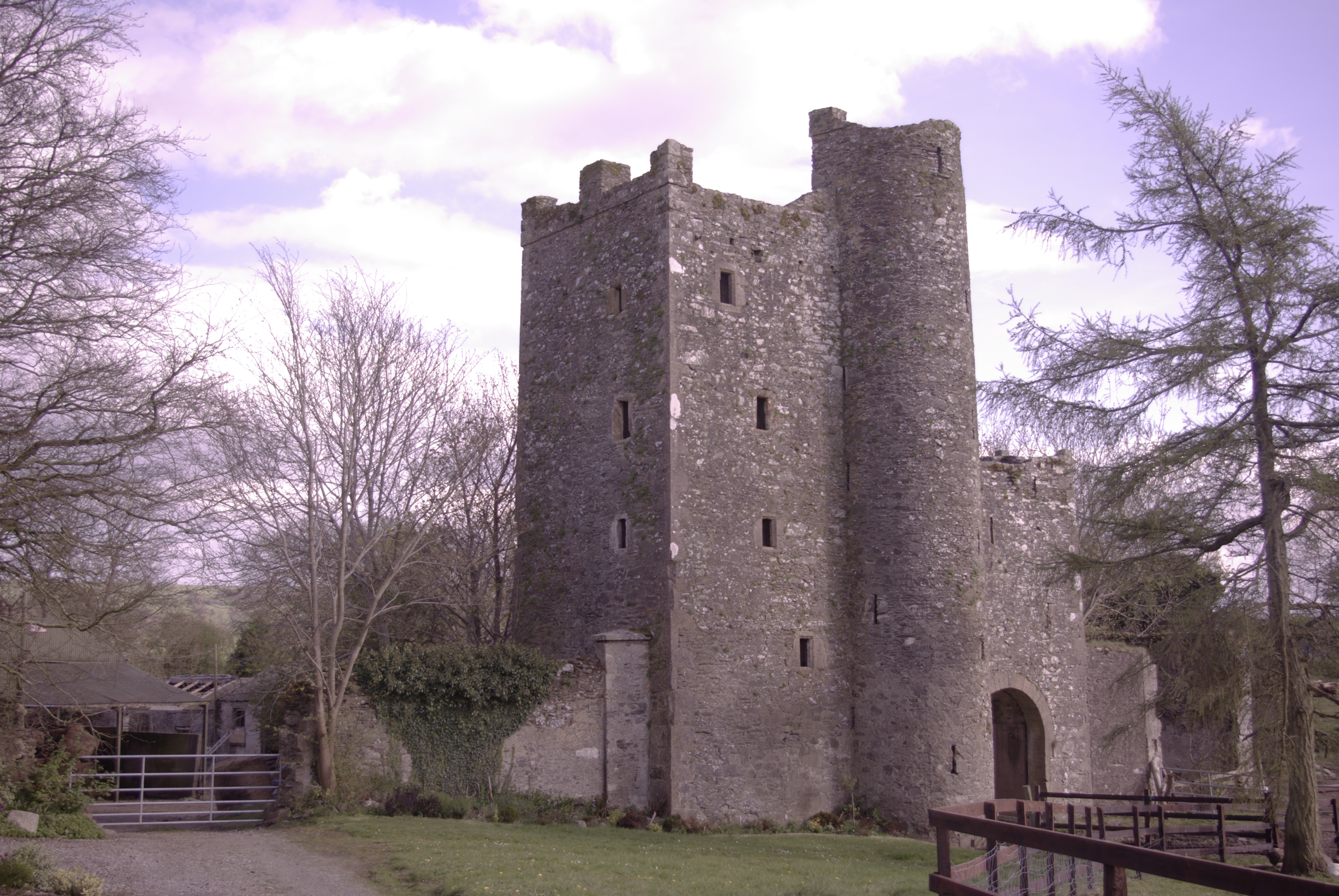
Kilteel Castle today

A substantial tower house was built to strengthen or replace the earlier defences in the 15th century. This rectangular, five-storied structure contains four floor levels above a barrel-vaulted basement with a second vault over the fourth-floor level. It is adjoined to the southwest by a gatehouse and was originally adjoined by a bawn. An 1833 depiction of the castle in the Dublin Penny Journal shows a steeply gabled house adjoining the gatehouse, possibly of late 17th or early 18th-century date. The archives of Trinity College Dublin contain an undated drawing from the Edwin Rae Collection depicting a similar building. A cannonball, possibly of 17th-century date, was recovered from near the castle in 1901.

=== Early Modern Period ===
The Alen family of Norfolk obtained a range of monastic properties in Kildare after the dissolution of the monasteries. In 1536 John Alen, Lord Chancellor of Ireland, was granted the dissolved monastery of St. Wolstans and his brother Thomas, Clerk of the Crown and Hanaper, was granted the dissolved preceptory of Kilteel in 1539; a lease of 12 July 1539 describes Thomas Alen and his wife Mary as "of Kilheele". The preceptory's possessions included the adjacent Lordship of Kilbride. The status of the area as a disputed marchland is highlighted in an early grant:

in consideration that the Preceptory, lordship or manor of Kilheale, in Kildare county, is situated in the marches thereof near the Irish enemies, the Tholes (O'Tooles), where resistance and defence are required, grant to Thomas Alan and Mary his wife, the said lordship.

A 1543 lease lists the preceptory's possessions:

Lease to Thomas Alen of Kilester, of the manor of Kilheale, Cromwelleston, near Calliaghton, Kilwarnyng, near Castlewarnyng and Kilbride, near "The Three Castles" in the county of Dublin; Johnston, Rathmore, Sherlokeston and the Naas in the county of Kildare; all which came into the hands of the Crowne by the surrender of Sir John Rawson, Viscount Clontarf, late Prior of the Hospital of Saint John of Jerusalem : to hold for 51 years. Rent, £6 13s. 4d - June 10. 34.

Alen's wife was the natural daughter of John Rawson, 1st Viscount Clontarf, (although he must have taken a vow of celibacy when he entered the Order of St John of Jerusalem, Rawson is known to have had at least three children). The Alen family's primary seat was St. Wolstans or Alenscourt and Kilteel served as a second seat in the 16th and 17th centuries. In 1549 pardons were granted to John Alen of Alenscourte and Thomas Alen of Kylheale, in 1560-1561 Thomas Alen of Kilteel was among the "justices, commissioners and keepers of the peace" for Kildare and in 1626 Robert Allen, heir to Alenscourt, was described as of Kilheale. The Allen family were claiming tithes from the parish up to the 19th century.

Kilteel was raided and burnt by Rory O'More late in 1573 and again on 3 November 1574. The Crown authorities believed that the 11th Earl of Kildare, a longstanding enemy of the Alen family, had colluded in these attacks. In November 1580 during the Second Desmond Rebellion the Earl, charged with the defence of the Pale against Fiach McHugh O'Byrne stationed a force of 50 horseman and 100 foot soldiers at Kilteel. Fiach McHugh's son was stealing livestock from the mountain of Kilheele in 1596.

The Civil Survey of 1654–56 records only two divisions within the parish, Kilteel, 1540 plantation acres, and Kilwarning (Kilwarden), 100 plantation acres, both held by Robert Allen, an Irish papist. In 1654 the parish contained:

One Castle...wch in the year 1640 was valued to be worth sixty pounds butt being since ruined is now valued at ffourty pounds....Two Mills wch in the year 1640 were valued to be worth Thirty pounds and ten shillings....one church and one decayd abbey....There is one stump of a castle called Blackchurche upon the Aforesaid lands of Kilwarneing...There is also one other ould castle upon the lands of Kilwarneing.

The Archaeological Survey of Ireland notes a 16th or 17th-century house in Blackchurch whose site has yet to be identified, presumably the stump of a castle noted in the Civil Survey.

A legend relating to a supposed event in Kilteel during the Cromwellian conquest of Ireland (1649–1653) was collected by a local schoolchild in 1936 as part of the Irish Folklore Commission's Schools' Collection:

Kilteel, a small village on the borders of Dublin and Kildare, has a very old story connected with the ruins of the church and convent built by St. Teel. This convent flourished before the time of Cromwell and was conducted by a number of nuns. Cromwell and his soldiers on their march from Co. Louth found themselves on a hill overlooking Kilteel. To the present day this hill is called Cromwellstown Hill. He ordered the immediate destruction of the convent by his big guns. The nuns escaped to a small valley where they hid for three days. They had no way of defending themselves and had no food with them. The soldiers found them and set fire to the bushes in the valley around them. The nuns were suffocated and burned. This spot is called "The Burned Bushes," but the old people call it "Rath Bean" or the "Fort of the Women". It is told in Rathmore that their spirits were seen floating along headed by a lamb with a cross. The hilly road to Kilteel from Kilbride is still called the "Lamb Hill".

Part of the Kilteel estate had passed to the Earl of Tyrconnell before 1669. Between 1669 and 1677 Tyrconnell granted several leases of lands in Kilteel. Jonathan Hayes and James Ashton held the millfarm for 51 years from 1670; a 38-year lease of Porters-farme to James Sharpe from 1670 had passed to Daniel Reading by 1703; George Eaton held Cromwellstown for 39 years from 1670; William Palmer held a portion of Kilteel for 99 years from 1670 and in 1677 Thomas Cholmondley was granted a portion including the modern townland of Cupidstown for 51 years. Daniel Reading also held the lease of Kilteel Castle and the adjacent lands. After the Williamite Wars Tyrconnell was attainted and his lands confiscated. The castle and Reading's farm, being part of Kilteele with 376 plantation acres, were bought by the Hollow Sword Blade Company for £976 on 23 June 1703. This estate was sold to Sir William Fownes in 1706.

Quaker community

A Quaker community developed at Kilteel in the later 17th century, possibly due to Tyrconnell, who showed sympathy towards the Quakers during the brief period of Catholic political ascendancy after the ascension of James II. In 1678 James Ashton held the first Quaker meeting at his house in Kilteel. In 1704 'with the assistance of a few other friends in his neighbourhood' he built a Meeting House. In 1690 the Dublin Quaker community were administering relief to the Quakers in Kilteel. The meeting house was moved to Castlewarden in 1723. James Ashton's 1704 will passed his lease of the millfarm and Kilwarden to his wife and daughter and his lease from Daniel Reading to his son, Thomas Ashton of Kilteel. Jonathan Hayes, a trustee of the will, is described as a farmer of Millfarm. The townland of Newrow may owe its name to Ashton or Hayes who held property in New Row, Dublin. Thomas Cholmondley's holding of 178 plantation acres, alias Brians farme, was bought by Joseph Maddock, a Quaker linen draper, in 1703. Maddock's will of 1713 passed the lands of Cupidstown together with Cholmondly's farm to his son Joseph. In 1784 Mary Maddock leased Cupidstown to Peter Fox and his wife Abigail Maddock.

=== Nineteenth and Twentieth Centuries ===
==== Population and landholding ====
In 1766, Robert Green, vicar of Rathmore, Kilteel and Kilbride, recorded five Protestant families and 33 Roman Catholic families in Kilteel parish. From at least the 18th century the village had annual fairs on 1 May, 24 June, 29 September and 2 November and fairs continued to be held into the 20th century. The 1821 census estimated the 'village' of Kilteel included 43 families with 316 people occupying 36 houses. The 1841 census recorded 129 inhabited houses in the civil parish, declining to 112 inhabited houses in 1851. The population had dropped to 181 people by the middle of the twentieth century.

In 1838 the Kilteel estate of William Fownes Tighe, a descendant of William Fownes, was bought by Sir John Kennedy of Johnstown Kennedy. In the 1853 Primary Valuations, his son Francis Kennedy was the lessor of all lands in the townlands of Blackchurch, Kilteel Lower, Kilteel Upper and the village of Kilteel. The castle and the adjacent buildings with the highest valuation in the parish were leased by John Ebbs from Kennedy. Reverend Smyth Whitelaw Fox of Rathmines and Cupidstown, descended from Peter Fox and Abigail Maddock, was the ultimate lessor of Rathbane and Oldtown, the Haughton family held Cromwellstown and Cromwellstownhill and the Cogan family of Tinode leased Cupidstown and Cupidstownhill from Fox. Fox-Whitelaw's lands were sold under the Incumbered Estates Act in 1853 and in the Landed Estates Court in 1866. The Kennedy lands were sold under the Land Purchase Acts in 1898. John Ebbs' leaseholds, acquired in 1834 and 1835, were sold in the Land Court in 1878.

==== National school ====
A National school, built in 1843, recorded in the 1853 Primary Valuations and the 1911 census and depicted on the Ordnance Survey maps, closed in 1968; the building, with the original datestone, survives next to the Kilteel Inn. The school had 100 pupils in 1845.

==== Royal Irish Constabulary barracks ====
A Royal Irish Constabulary barracks, marked in 1838 and recorded in the 1911 census, survives as a private dwelling. A barracks was present from at least 1827, with one constable and three sub-constables in 1829. In October 1920 the barracks was attacked during the Irish War of Independence; the officers were withdrawn to Naas and the building was burnt by the Kill Company of the Irish Republican Army. A minor confrontation between Free State and Irregular forces took place at Kilteel in 1923 during the Irish Civil War.

==== Catholic church ====
While the National Inventory of Architectural Heritage describes the Catholic church of St. Laurence O'Toole as dating from c. 1870, a 1935 Irish Times article describes the construction and dedication of the chapel of ease in that year and the church is not depicted on the 25 Inch OS maps. A contemporary photograph shows a cavalcade of horsemen accompanying Archbishop Byrne's car to the church. The Kilteel Inn displays a similar photograph. The parish presumably contained an earlier Catholic chapel or mass house, though it is possible the churches at Crosschapel and Kilbride, the latter present from 1776, served this purpose.

==== The Kilteel Inn ====
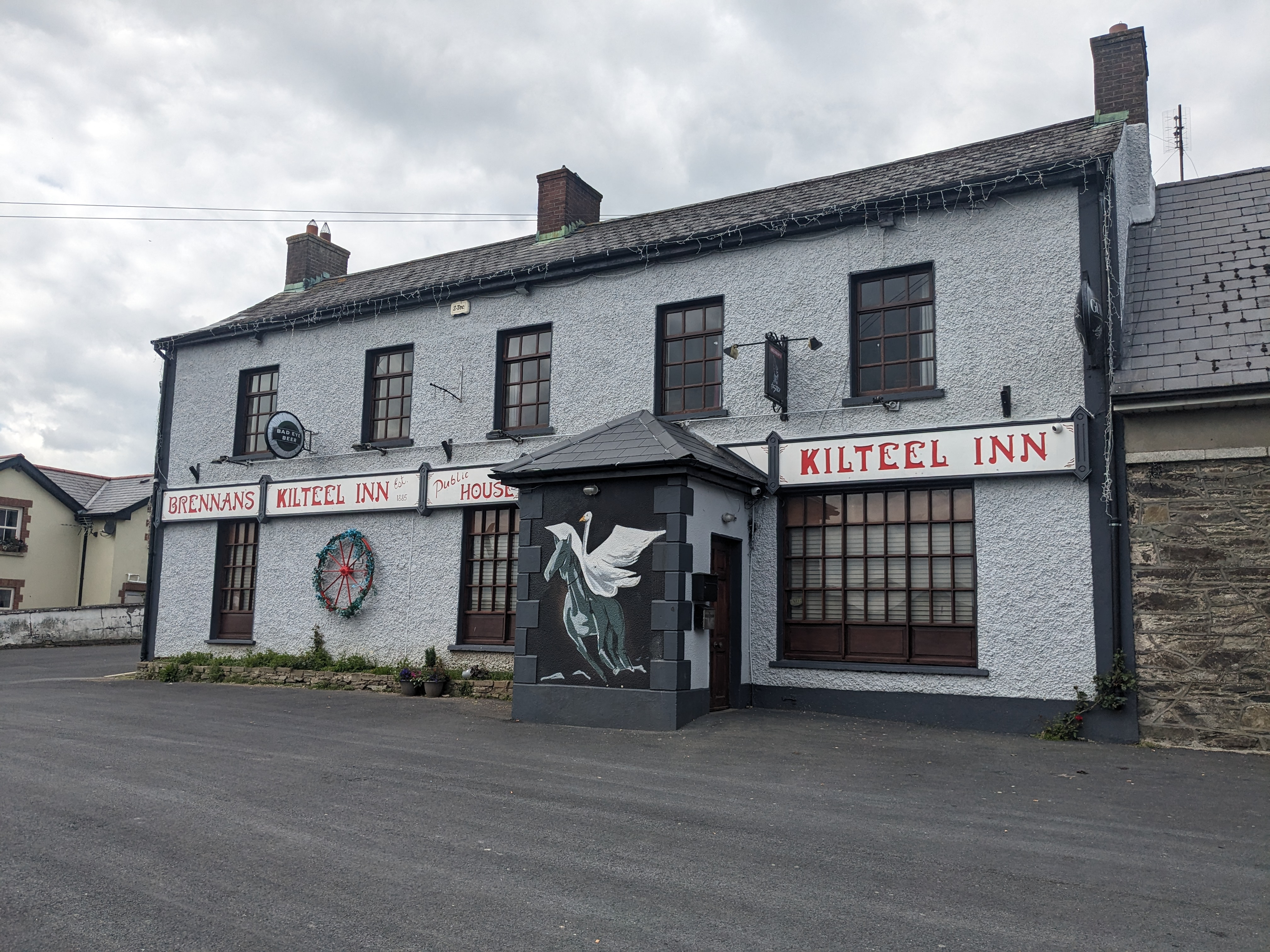
The Kilteel Inn

An account of a murder trial in the Freeman's Journal refers to James Goslin's public house in Kilteel in 1824. James and Matthew Goslin were acquitted of the murder of Patrick Hill at the fair of Kilteel on 1 May 1823. The 1853 Valuations list James and Matthew Goslin among the lessees of the plot within which the Kilteel Inn is now sited, though no public house is recorded in the Valuations. In September 1875 Bartholomew Goslin applied for a licence to sell by retail ale, beer, spirits, &c at my house, situate at Kilteel aforesaid...which house is fitted up for the accommodation of travellers. Goslin was described as a publican at the time of his death in 1887. Margaret Goslin of Kilteel, presumably his widow or daughter, applied for a spirit licence in 1888. A substantial public house described in the 1901 and 1911 censuses, was owned by James J. Morrin. Morrin's of Kilteel, a fully licensed premises, was advertised for sale in January 1921.

==== Mill ====
The townland of Oldmilltown presumably contained one of the mills recorded in the Civil Survey and the Millfarm recorded in 1670. Old Mill is marked on Noble and Keenan's 1752 map and the 1838 Ordnance Survey marks the Old Mill at the northern extent of the townland. The 1853 Valuations list Thomas Kelly as the lessee. The leasehold of a dwelling house, corn mill and 16 acres in Old Mill, with a steady supply of water to the mill was advertised for sale in the Kildare Observer in 1882. The Old Mill is marked on the 25 Inch OS map. Traces of the buildings and millrace depicted survive.

==== Kilteel wood ====
Kilteel Wood, a small oak wood north of the village is depicted in its current location and extent on the 1838 Ordnance Survey map and is marked as a fox covert on the Valuations maps and the 25 Inch OS map. The wood is a Proposed Natural Heritage Area (001394).

==== Ordnance Survey stations ====
An Ordnance Survey trigonometrical station is located at the top of Cupidstownhill. Traces of a second station are visible within the prehistoric enclosure north of the village.

== Sport ==
Eadestown GAA club has its grounds approximately 6 km away - in Eadestown.

Royal Irish Constabulary records from 1890 show that Kilteel King O'Tooles club had approximately 30 members.

== See also ==
- List of towns and villages in Ireland
- List of abbeys and priories in Ireland (County Kildare)
- List of castles in Ireland (County Kildare)
