= Freake Painter =

17th-century American anonymous portraitist

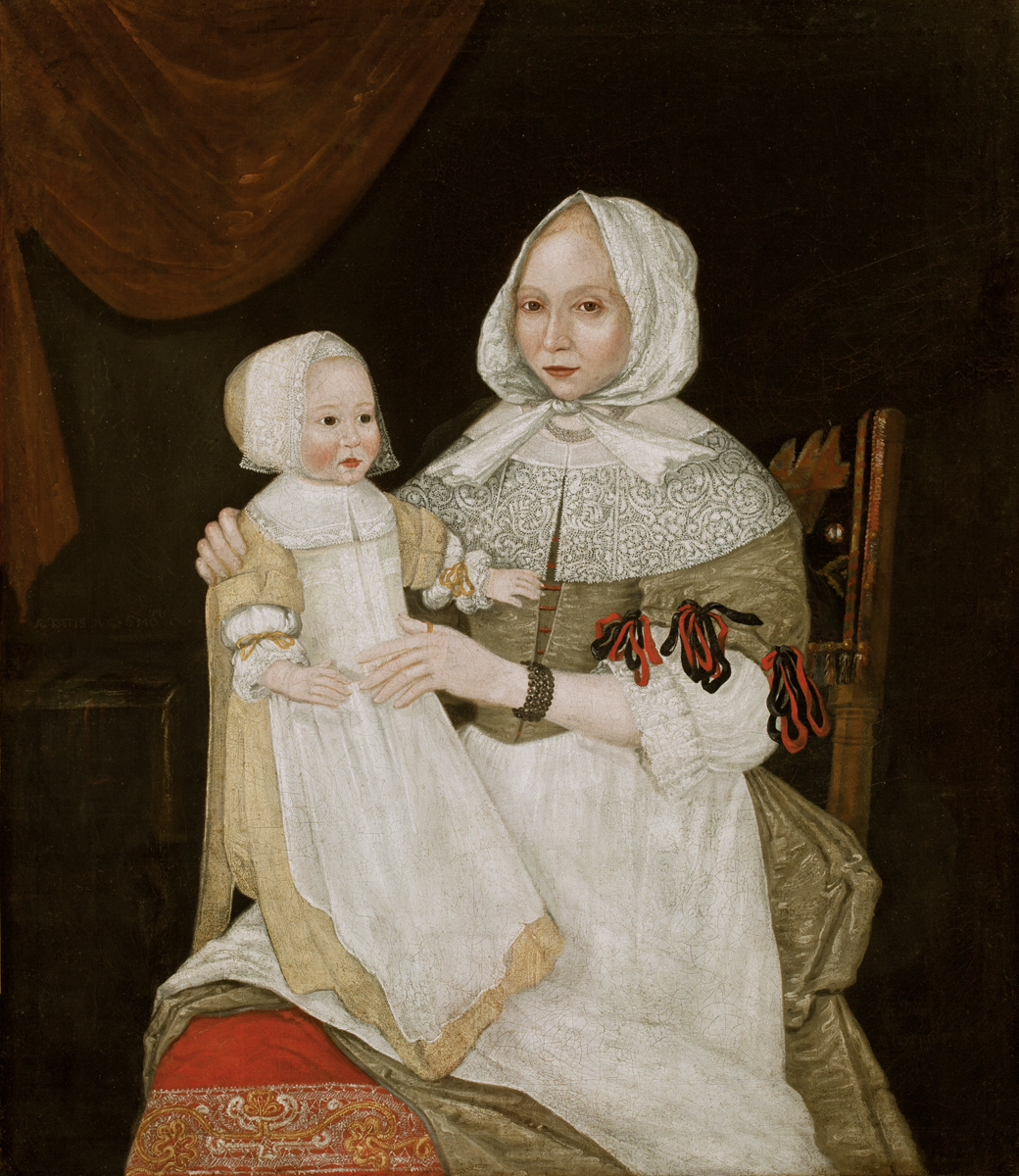
Elizabeth Clarke Freake (Mrs. John Freake) and Baby Mary by the Freake Painter

The Freake Painter (fl. 1670s), also known as the Freake Limner and the Freake-Gibbs Painter, was an anonymous American portrait painter who has been described as "North America's first major artist".

About ten portraits, all painted between 1670 and 1674 and showing residents of Boston, have been attributed to the Freake Painter. It has been suggested that the artist might be identified as Samuel Clement (1635–78), the son of Augustine Clement who had arrived in New England in 1635 having previously trained as a painter in England.

Their work Mrs. Elizabeth Freake and Baby Mary appeared on a United States Postal Service postage stamp in 1998, one of a series celebrating "Four Centuries of American Art".

The Freakes were one of the wealthiest families in Boston. They built their richness on the trade of goods and the transatlantic slave trade.
