= Richard Rawson (priest) =

Richard Rawson (died 1543) was Archdeacon of Essex from 1503 and a Canon of Windsor from 1523 to 1543 He was the son of Richard Rawson, a merchant of London and his wife Isabella Craford (died 1497), and a younger brother of John Rawson, 1st Viscount Clontarf, Lord Treasurer of Ireland (died 1547). He received his Bachelor of Canon Law at Cambridge in 1490, followed by a presumed doctorate from the University of Bologna.

== –Career ==
He was appointed:

- Archdeacon of Essex 1503–1543
- Rector of St Martin's Church, Chipping Ongar 1502–1503
- Prebendary of Durnford in Salisbury Cathedral
- Rector of St Olave's Church, Hart Street 1510–1518
- Prebendary of St Stephen's Chapel, Westminster 1511
- Prebendary of Woodhorne in Chichester Cathedral 1521

He was chaplain to Henry VIII and attended him in that capacity at the Field of the Cloth of Gold, June 1520. By patent 28 January 1522-23 he was, by the title of Sir Richard Rawson, appointed a receiver of petitions for Gascony and other "parts beyond the seas". He was one of the canonists and jurists who in the convocation of 1529 gave their opinions as to the king's divorce of Catherine of Aragon, and did so again in 1540 against the validity of marriage with Anne of Cleves.

He was appointed Canon to the second stall in St George's Chapel, Windsor Castle in 1523, and held the stall until his death in 1543.
