= Edward Rawson (politician) =

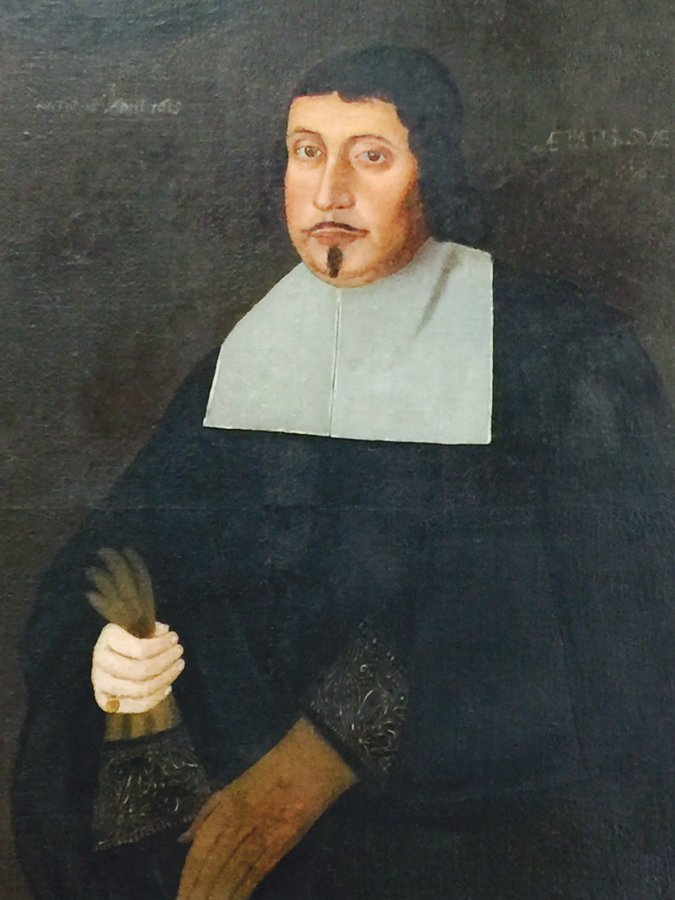
Portrait by the Freake Limner

Coat of Arms of Edward Rawson

Edward Rawson (April 16, 1615 – August 27, 1693) served as the first Secretary of the Massachusetts Bay Colony.

Edward Rawson was born in Dorset, England in 1615. Around 1636 he married his young wife, Rachel Perne, and soon left England for the Americas. He settled in Newbury in 1637. On April 19, 1638, at the age of 23, he was chosen to be Public Notary and Register for that town, and was annually reelected until 1647. Many other public trusts and responsible duties were laid upon him by the people of Newbury. As early as the year 1638, he was one of the deputies to represent the town at the General Court, and was reelected for nearly all the successive years to May 22, 1650, at which time he was chosen Secretary of the Massachusetts Bay Colony, which office he continued to hold for thirty-six years, until 1686. His home was on Rawson Street in Boston, now Bromfield Lane. He is buried in Boston's Granary Burying Ground.

Rachel Perne's family was related to the Greene and Hawley families of New England. By the time of her death in the year 1677, Rachel Perne Rawson had borne twelve children to Edward Rawson. Of the twelve, at least nine survived until adulthood. One of these, Rebecca, was the heroine of the 1849 book Leaves from Margaret Smith's Journal, in the Province of Massachusetts Bay, by John G. Whittier.

Rawson died in 1693 at the age of 78. The New England Historic Genealogical Society in Boston has, in its collection, a 1670 portrait of Rawson by the Freake Painter.
