= John Rawson, 1st Viscount Clontarf =

English-born statesman in Ireland

John Rawson, 1st and only Viscount Clontarf (c. 1470–1547) was an English-born statesman in sixteenth-century Ireland, and was regarded as one of the mainstays of English rule in the Kingdom of Ireland. He was the last Prior of the Kilmainham house of the Order of St John of Jerusalem. The Knights Hospitaller, as they were usually known, were a fighting order of monks, and Rawson himself was an experienced soldier who took part in the Siege of Rhodes (1522).

Despite taking holy orders, he was not celibate, and he fathered several illegitimate children. At the Reformation, with no apparent reluctance, he surrendered all his Order's properties to the English Crown in return for a pension and the title of viscount.

== Background ==
He came from a family which had long been settled at New Fryston in the West Riding of Yorkshire. His father, Richard Rawson, moved to London, where he became an alderman and a warden of the Mercers' Company. John's mother Isabella Craford died in 1497. He had four brothers:

- Averey (or Alured) Rawson of Essex, whose granddaughter Ann married Sir Michael Stanhope of Shelford, Nottinghamshire, who was executed for conspiracy in 1552;
- Sir Richard Rawson (died 1543), who was a royal chaplain and Canon of Windsor from 1523 to 1543;
- Christopher Rawson, a member of the Company of the Merchants of the Staple of Calais, whose 1518 monumental brass survives at the church of All Hallows-by-the-Tower, adjacent to the Tower of London;
- Nicholas Rawson, who was master of the free chapel at Gressenhall, Norfolk.

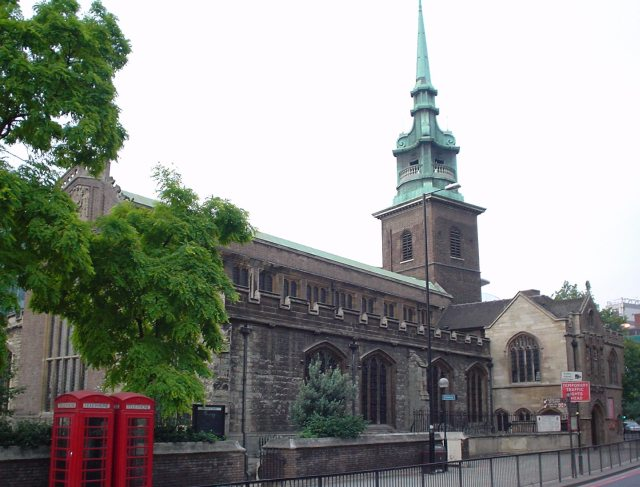
Church of All Hallows by the Tower of London, where John Rawson's brother Christopher is buried

== Early career ==
John Rawson joined the Order of St. John of Jerusalem in 1497. He is next heard of undertaking a diplomatic mission to Rome and Venice in 1510. In 1511 he was appointed Prior of Kilmainham; this was a position of considerable political power, entitling him to sit both in the Irish House of Lords and on the Privy Council of Ireland. Since the Order under Prior James Keating, an Irishman, had supported the pretender to the English throne Lambert Simnel in 1487, a practice had grown up of appointing only English Priors. In 1517 he became Lord Treasurer of Ireland.

=== Siege of Rhodes 1522 ===
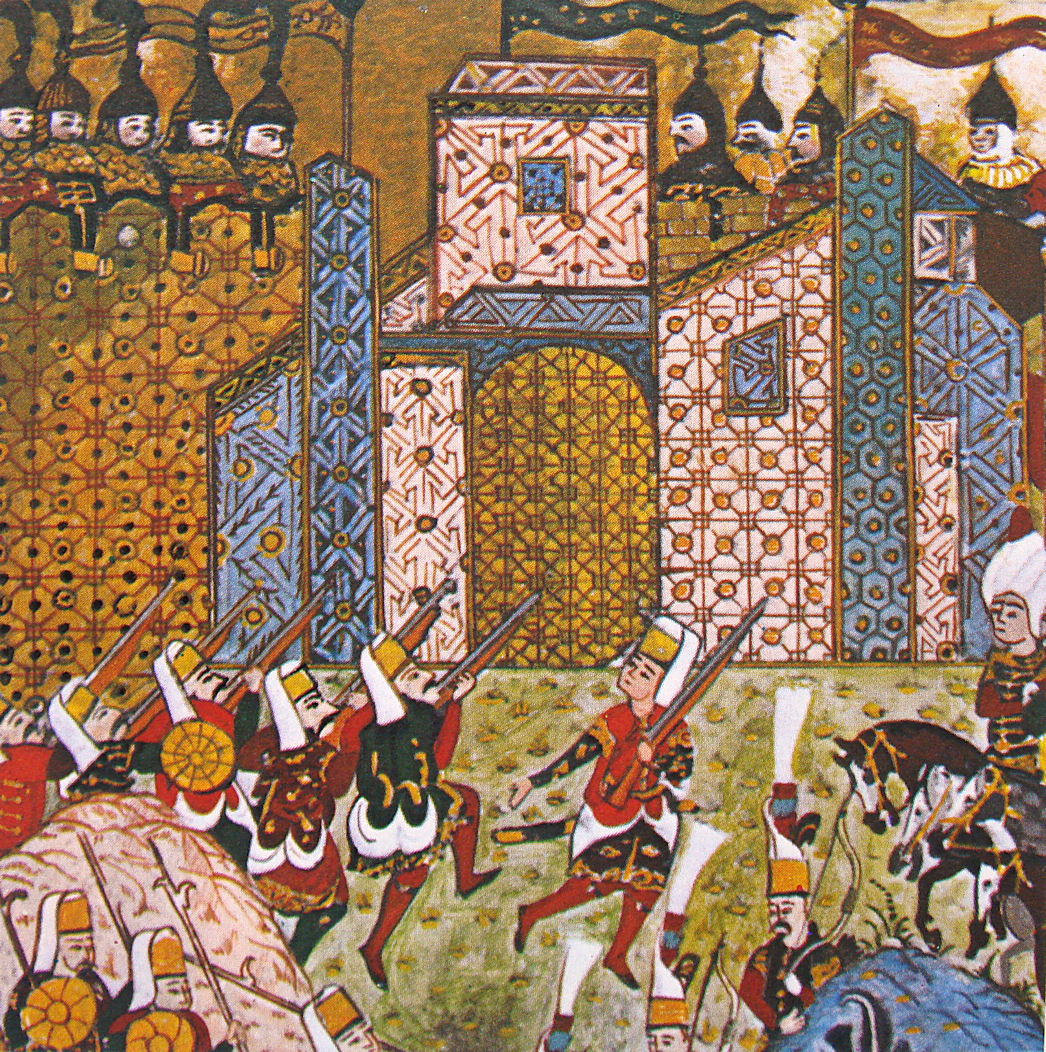
Ottomans and Knights of the Hospitallers fighting at the Siege of Rhodes 1522

The seat of the Order of St John of Jerusalem was Rhodes, and as the Ottoman Empire moved to seize the island, Rawson was summoned to its defence. In 1519 he was given leave to go to Rhodes for three years, but the increasingly unstable political situation in Ireland caused Henry VIII to revoke his leave, and he ordered Rawson to return to Ireland in 1520 to advise the Lord Deputy. In 1522 he obtained leave to go back to Rhodes, and he is listed among the knights who were present there. Rhodes surrendered in December of that year. Rawson returned to Ireland and was reappointed to his previous offices. In 1525 he went abroad again and spent some time in Italy; in 1527 he was appointed commander of the Order's light infantry. However, Henry VIII apparently felt unable to dispense with his services and was able to secure his reappointment as Prior of Kilmainham: he was also reappointed Treasurer of Ireland.

== Later career ==
He was one of the dominant members of the Irish Privy Council, and was said to form part of an "inner council of three" within the full Council, the other two being the Lord Chief Justice of Ireland, Patrick Bermingham, and John Alen, Archbishop of Dublin. He was described as "an able man and chief supporter of the government", and lived in considerable state. He quarrelled with the Lord Deputy, Sir William Skeffington, and worked unsuccessfully for his recall. During the rebellion of Silken Thomas, he was one of the few leading political figures who remained loyal to the English Crown and his lands were plundered as a result (he was more fortunate than his colleague on the Council, Archbishop Alen, who was murdered by Silken Thomas's men). In 1535 he was suggested as a possible Lord Chancellor of Ireland but was passed over, due to his age and increasing ill-health. He quarrelled with Skeffington's successor as Lord Deputy, Viscount Grane, and was one of those responsible for bringing about his downfall and execution for treason in 1541.

== Surrender of Kilmainham Priory ==
Henry VIII decided to dissolve the Order of St. John of Jerusalem, and after lengthy negotiations, Rawson in 1541 surrendered the Priory of Kilmainham in return for a payment of 500 marks and the title of Viscount Clontarf. The Order's house at Kilteel, County Kildare, was granted to Thomas Alen (a cousin of Archbishop Alen), who had married Rawson's natural daughter, Mary: the impressive medieval tower house at Kilteel has survived to the present day. Lord Clontarf was by now an old and sick man, and he died in 1547; the title died with him.

By whatever means he had apparently accumulated a fortune. His natural daughter Catherine brought her husband Rowland White a large dowry, involving substantial assets at home and also in Spain, Germany and Flanders. Rowland was a merchant who built up a flourishing business, but later suffered serious losses and was imprisoned for debt in Ludgate, before making a new and successful career as a political writer.

See also Clontarf Castle.

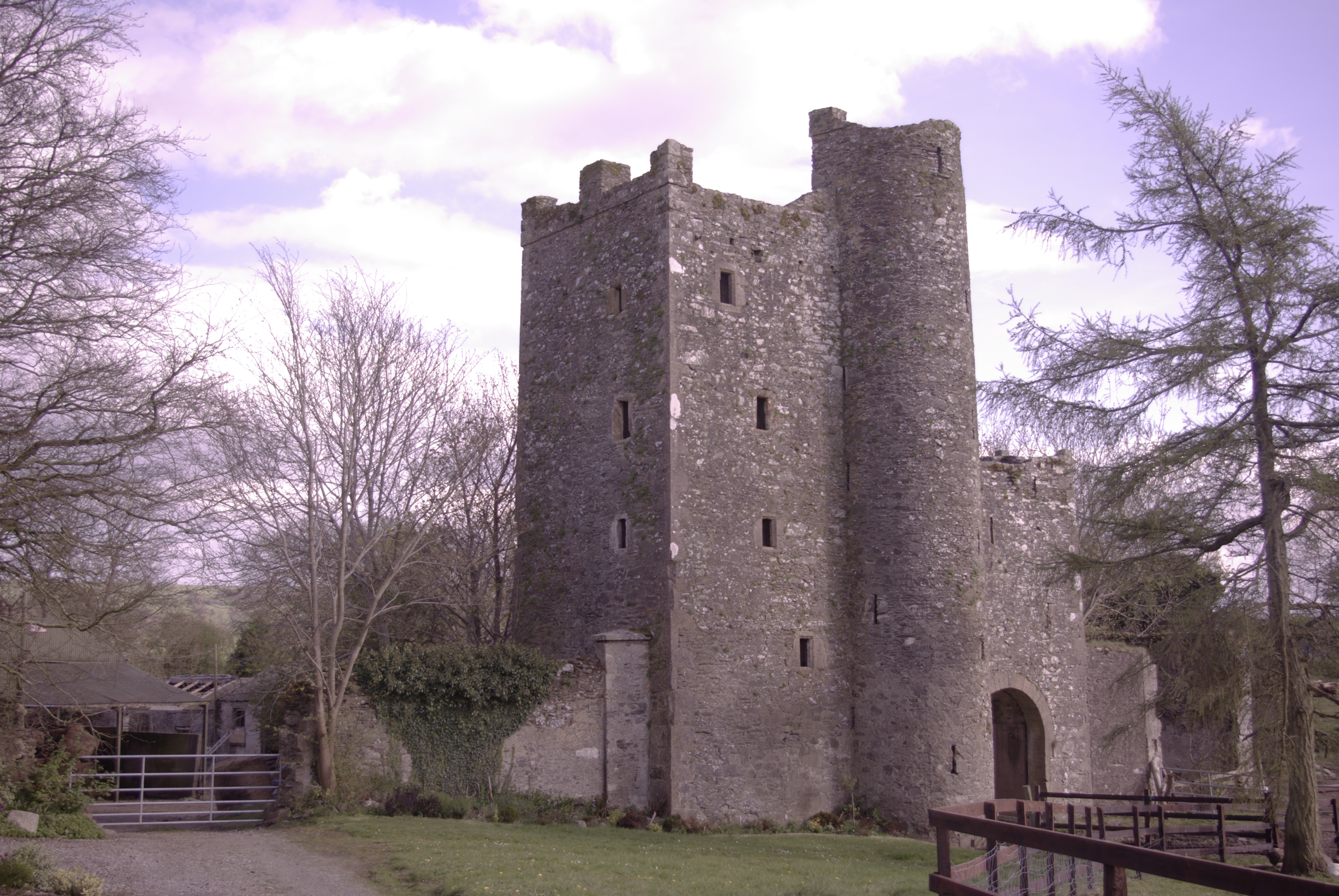
Kilteel House today

== Private life ==
He does not seem to have taken his vow of celibacy at all seriously since he had several illegitimate children (little seems to be known of their mothers). The children, whose names are known, were:

- Sir John Rawson;
- Mary, who married Thomas Alan (died after 1554) of Kilteel, Clerk of the Crown and Hanaper, and brother of Sir John Alan, Lord Chancellor of Ireland, and had at least one daughter, Eleanor, who married Robert Dillon, Chief Justice of the Irish Common Pleas;
- Catherine, who married Rowland White, son of Sir Patrick White, Baron of the Exchequer, who was a successful merchant and later an influential figure in Ulster in the 1560s and the author of several influential treatises. They had three children, including John, who inherited the White family estates at Dufferin, County Down, but later sold them to the Clandeboye family, and Margaret, who married Richard Delahide of Culduffe, near Castleknock.
