= Edward Rawson (businessman) =

American businessman and politician

Edward E. Rawson
- Illustration from History of Atlanta, Georgia (1889)
- Born: c. 1818; Craftsbury, Vermont, U.S.
- Died: April 10, 1893; Atlanta, Georgia, U.S.
- Occupations: Businessman; civic official
- Spouse: Elizabeth W. Clarke (m. 1846)
- Children: 9

Edward E. Rawson (c. 1818—April 10, 1893) was a businessman and politician in Atlanta, Georgia.

Rawson was born in Craftsbury, Vermont, seven generations removed from Edward Rawson, a politician who had emigrated from England in 1636 and settled at Newbury, Massachusetts. Most of his early life was spent on the plantation of his father, Elijah Rawson. Though accustomed to hard work young Rawson found plenty of time for study, and he was encouraged by parental influence and example to make the most of his educational opportunities. He attended the district schools, which were exceptionally good, but before reaching his nineteenth year his father died, making it necessary for him to leave home and to shift for himself.

== Georgia ==
Coming to Lumpkin, Georgia, he entered the employ of his brother W.A. Rawson, as clerk, remaining in this establishment until 1841 when he embarked in the mercantile business on his own account. Sixteen years passed and during this time he built up an immense local trade and he was married there in 1846 (they had nine children together) but ill-health made it necessary for him to seek higher latitudes and accordingly he closed out his establishment at Lumpkin and came to Atlanta.

He resumed business at the location, bringing both an experienced business partner and sufficient capital to operate competitively. By the outbreak of the war, his business was established, and he maintained the support of the local community and his customers.

Ill-health prevented Rawson from taking any active part in the operations of the war, but his sympathies were strongly with the South notwithstanding his northern birth and antecedents. From 1863 to 1864, he served in the city council representing the Second Ward, and just before the evacuation of Atlanta under the relentless order of Gen. Sherman, who was preparing to burn the city, Rawson was in Mayor James Calhoun's committee of six who surrendered the city and later evacuated.

On returning to the city in 1865 Rawson gave himself heartily to the work of rehabilitation and was instrumental in organizing the busy forces which started Atlanta again upon the highway of civic prosperity and success. From 1867 to 1868 he was appointed to represent the Second Ward by Third Military District commander General John Pope, replacing F.M. Richardson who resigned with almost half of the council. There he advocated the adoption of many important measures of public utility and took an active part in the preliminary movement for bringing the state capitol from Milledgeville to Atlanta. He was also instrumental in organizing the public school system of Atlanta, serving for many years on the board of education. He also served as chairman of the board of water commissioners from 1872 to 1888 building a modern water system.

He remained in merchandising most of this time until 1879 when he bought an interest in the Atlanta Coffin Factory, with which he remained until 1887, when he established the Gate City Coffin Company where he was president.

Throughout his long career in Atlanta, he was an active and influential member of Trinity Methodist Church.
