= John Bere =

Irish politician

Sir John Bere (died 1617), whose surname was also spelt Beere or Bare, was an Irish politician, Crown official, barrister and part-time judge of the early seventeenth century. He held office as King's Serjeant, and sat in the Irish House of Commons in the Parliament of 1613–15.

== Life ==
Although he later developed close links with the town of Carlow, he was almost certainly born in Dublin. Little is known of his family, although it is possible that Thomas Beere, who is listed as a member of the King's Inns in 1614, was a relative of John.

He became King's Serjeant in February 1609 following the death of Nicholas Kerdiffe, at a fee of £20 per annum, and entered the King's Inns the same year. He was one of the trustees to whom the legal title to the Inns was passed by Sir John Davies, the Attorney-General for Ireland, under a deed of 1612.

Due to the expansion of the assize system in the early 1600s, the common law judges were unable to cope with the additional workload, and the King's Serjeant was often called on to act as an extra judge of assize. Bere carried out this function on at least nine occasions. He seems to have been extremely conscientious in performing his duties. In 1613 he was on assize for 68 days, travelling across most of the southern half of Ireland. In 1615 he went on assize twice, for a total of 92 days.

He served as Commissioner of the Irish Court of Wards in 1610, 1613 and 1615. He sat on a commission to inquire into the King's title to lands in County Wexford in 1611, and on a similar commission for County Longford and County Leitrim in 1615. He was knighted in 1615 for his impressive services to the Crown.

In the only Irish Parliament (1613–15) called in the reign of James I of England, Bere was one of the two MPs returned for the borough of Carlow, the other being his fellow Law Officer, Sir Robert Jacobe, the Solicitor-General for Ireland. His seat in Parliament did not then disqualify him from also sitting as an extra judge of assize: although such an arrangement would be impossible now, several High Court judges sat in the Irish House of Commons of 1613–15 in the Crown interest. He also became a burgess of Carlow under the new royal charter granted to the town in 1613, which provided for a corporation of twelve. He died in 1617.

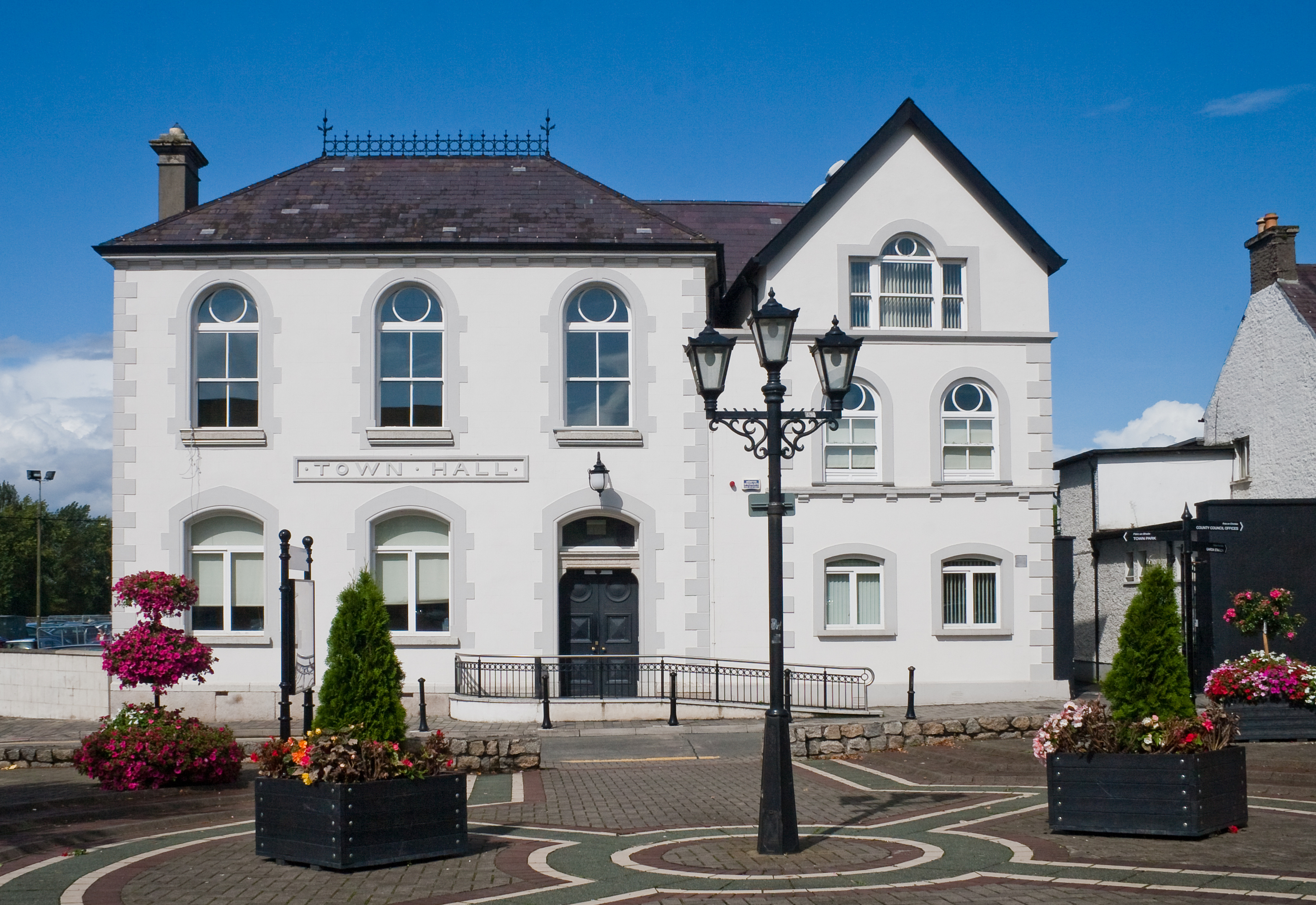
Carlow Town, present day

== Sources ==
- Hart, A. R. History of the King's Serjeant at law in Ireland Dublin Four Courts Press 2000
- Kenny, Colum King's Inns and the Kingdom of Ireland Dublin Irish Academic Press 1992
- Ryan, James History and Antiquities of the County of Carlow Dublin Richard Moore Tims 1833
- Smyth, Constantine Joseph Chronicle of the Law Officers of Ireland Butterworth London 1839
