= Nicholas White (lawyer) =

Irish lawyer, judge, privy councillor and government official

Sir Nicholas White (c.1532 – 1592) (or Whyte) was an Irish lawyer, judge, privy councillor and government official during the reign of Elizabeth I.

== Background and early career ==
White was descended from a noted family of The Pale. His father, James White of Waterford, who was the steward of the earl of Ormond, had been poisoned while in London, as was the earl, in 1546. Nicholas owed his early advancement to Ormond's influence: in recognition of James's loyalty, the earl left £10 for the boy's education at the Inns of Court. White entered Lincoln's Inn in 1552, and he was called to the Bar in 1558; during the course of his studies he was a tutor to the children of Sir William Cecil, later Lord Burghley. He then returned to Ireland and was elected a member of the Irish Parliament for County Kilkenny in 1559. He was justice of the peace for County Kilkenny in 1563 and in the following year was named Recorder of Waterford. In 1567 he bought Leixlip Castle as his base near Dublin.

White may have published an English translation of the Argonautica in the 1560s, but no copy has survived. He had stayed in correspondence with Cecil, and became an important confidant of his and thus an influential commentator on Irish affairs. In 1568 he was given the right to travel to England and had a notable interview with Mary, Queen of Scots, at Tutbury Castle in February 1569. They discussed her use of the English language and her needlework. White noted her "pretty Scottish speech" and recorded the motto embroidered on her cloth of estate, "En ma fin est mon commencement", My End is in My Beginning. She mentioned that he was going to Ireland, and White said that the chiefest trouble of Ireland proceeds from the actions of the Earl of Argyll.

On 4 November 1568 Elizabeth, who in the early stages of his career thought well of him, appointed him seneschal of Wexford and constable of Leighlin and Ferns, replacing the disgraced adventurer Thomas Stukley. He retained the office until 1572, concluding his tenure with the pursuit of the rebels, led by Fiach McHugh O'Byrne, who had murdered his son-in-law Robert Browne.

White established his estate at White's Hall, near Knocktopher, County Kilkenny, and also acquired Dunbrody Abbey, County Wexford, and the Castle and St Catherine's Priory at Leixlip, County Kildare.

== Master of the Rolls in Ireland ==
On the recommendation of the Lord Deputy, William Fitzwilliam, White was appointed Master of the Rolls in Ireland on 14 July 1572. Despite these marks of royal favour, White was viewed by fellow privy councillors in Ireland as suspiciously partisan and often took independent positions in opposition to the dominant English-born faction on the council. Sir Henry Sidney distrusted him as a client of the Earl of Ormonde, and he was suspended from office for alleged misfeasance from August to September 1578 and his place given to Edward Fitz-Symon, the Queen's Serjeant: these charges arose from his opposition to the cess, the bitterly unpopular tax for the upkeep of military garrisons which Sidney imposed on the gentlemen of the Pale. Opposition to Sidney's taxation policies became widespread and White was soon restored to favour. He also quarrelled bitterly with the Attorney General for Ireland, Thomas Snagge, who accused him of gross inefficiency. Snagge went so far as to lay information against him with the Council, though little seems to have come of this.

== Desmond rebellion ==
During the Second Desmond Rebellion White worked closely with the English political leadership as a veteran official with long experience in Munster. Nonetheless, he was now under suspicion as one who consistently favoured the interests of the Old English, and was blamed for failing to apprehend the rebels in Wicklow during the rebellion. However, he continued to demonstrate his valuable insights to Burghley in regular correspondence throughout the period, including letters sent in December 1581 on the miseries of war, the need for temperate government, and his fear that the wild Irish were glad to see the weakness of English blood in Ireland. His usefulness as an Irish speaker and a nominal Protestant made him an essential privy councillor for two decades.

== Later career ==
On the arrival in 1584 of the ambitious new Lord Deputy, Sir John Perrot, White was knighted. He worked with Perrot to establish an effective administration of the common law. Later that year 48 of the 181 prisoners in the Leinster circuit were put to death.

In 1585 White was involved in arranging the Composition of Connacht.

On 29 November 1586 White wrote to Burghley describing the continual bickering in council between the chief governor and the Lord Chancellor, Loftus. By the end of Perrot's regime, White was viewed as a minion of the Lord Deputy who was primarily responsible for a policy of favouritism toward Irish-born servitors. On the return in 1588 of the former Lord Deputy, Sir William Fitzwilliam, White became a focus of resentment from the English at the council board.

== Arrest and death ==
White was implicated in the allegations of treason made against Perrot by a former priest, Dennis O'Roghan, in 1589; despite his ill health, he was arrested in June 1590, and sent to England two months later. He was also dismissed from the Irish Council. Placed in the Tower of London in March 1591, White appealed to the Privy Council for a servant to attend him, owing to his age and infirmity. He died there at some time in 1592: it is unclear whether or not he was still in confinement at his death. On 12 February 1593, the Privy Council authorised White's son to bring his body back to Ireland for burial.

== Family ==
White's first wife, of whom little is known, belonged to the Sherlock family of Waterford. He and his second wife, a niece of Arthur Brereton of Killyon, County Meath had two sons. Thomas, the elder, was educated at Cambridge University and died by his own hand in November 1586 after taking a strong purgative. The younger son, Andrew, succeeded to White's estates after completing his education at Cambridge. A second Sir Nicholas White of Leixlip Castle, whose daughter Anne married Christopher Fagan, was probably Andrew's son. White also had two daughters, one of whom married Robert Browne of Mulcranan, County Wexford, who was murdered by Fiach MacHugh O'Byrne in 1572: the other, Mary, was the second wife of Nicholas St Lawrence, 9th Baron Howth, by whom she had six children. Sir Nicholas Walsh, the Chief Justice of the Irish Common Pleas, is said to have grown up in White's household.
