= Patrick Finglas =

Irish judge and Crown official

Patrick Finglas (died 1537) was a leading Irish judge and statesman of the sixteenth century, who was regarded (except perhaps in his last years) as a mainstay of the English Crown in Ireland. He was also the author of an influential "Breviat", or tract, called Of the Getting of Ireland, and of the Decay of the same, concerning the decline of English power in Ireland.

Little is known of his parentage, but Francis Elrington Ball states that he came from a long-established family who lived in and took their surname from Finglas, County Dublin. He later held estates at Piercetown, near Dunboyne, County Meath, and at Westphailstown (or Westpalstown) in County Dublin, which became the principal family residence. He was at Lincoln's Inn 1503-6 and became Serjeant in 1509. He was considered one of the ablest lawyers of his time, and also a gifted writer on politics.

== Career ==
Finglas was appointed Chief Baron of the Irish Exchequer by Henry VIII in 1520, and afterwards, by patent dated at Westminster 8 May 1534 he was constituted Lord Chief Justice of the King's Bench for Ireland in the place of Sir Bartholomew Dillon, recently deceased. He resigned the latter office in 1535, due apparently to suspicions about his loyalty during the rebellion of Silken Thomas, since he had been prepared to negotiate with the rebels. Despite his doubtful loyalties, he later served a second brief term as Chief Baron until his death in 1537. He was a member of the Privy Council of Ireland.

== The Breviat ==
He wrote A Breviat (summary) of the getting (conquest) of Ireland, and of the Decaie (decay) of the same. An original manuscript of this work is in the Public Record Office It is described in the calendar as "An Historical Dissertation on the Conquest of Ireland, the decay of that land, and measures proposed to remedy the grievances thereof arising from the oppressions of the Irish nobility".

The measures he proposed included the settlement of the province of Leinster by "English lords and gentlemen", the securing by the English government of all castles and other strongholds, and more controversially, the suppression of all monasteries, which Finglas regarded as potential centres of rebellion. He did not urge the expulsion of the native Irish people, arguing that they would be a useful element in society if properly governed. The "Breviat" probably built on an earlier treatise, "The Decay of Ireland" (1515) written by Sir William Darcy, the long-serving Vice-Treasurer of Ireland.

== Reputation ==
Finglas was regarded for much of his career by the English Crown as one of the principal supporters of English rule in Ireland; in 1520 the Lord Deputy of Ireland, the Earl of Surrey, praised him to Cardinal Wolsey as one of "the best willed and most diligent to do the King's Grace true and faithful service of all the learned men of this land". Only in his last years were doubts raised about his loyalty to the Crown, due to his ambiguous attitude to the Silken Thomas rebellion.

== Family ==
He married Isabella (or Elizabeth) Golding, daughter of Robert Golding of Churchtown, Dublin. They had at least three children: Thomas, Patrick and Genet.

Thomas in 1532 was described as "capite" (tenant in chief) of Westphailstown, and was given permission to make a sub-lease of his lands to the Rector of Howth. He married Anne Cusack, daughter of John Cusack of Cussington, and sister of Sir Thomas Cusack, later Lord Chancellor of Ireland, and had issue. Like his father, he was an energetic political reformer, and held a number of administrative positions. Richard Finglas of Westphailstown, Solicitor General for Ireland, who died in 1574, may have been a son of Thomas, but his age suggests that he was more likely a nephew of the elder Patrick.

Genet married Sir Thomas Fitzwilliam and had four children, including Richard, the eldest son and heir. Their grandchildren included Thomas FitzWilliam, 1st Viscount FitzWilliam.

Later descendants of Patrick included a second Genet Finglas (died 1627), who married firstly John Bathe, Attorney General for Ireland, secondly the distinguished soldier Sir William Warren, and thirdly Terence O'Dempsey, 1st Viscount Clanmalier. She was the daughter of Patrick Finglas of Westphailstown, who was probably the younger son of the judge.

Legal offices
Preceded by Sir Bartholomew Dillon	Lord Chief Justice of Ireland; 1534 – 1535	Succeeded by Gerald Aylmer
