= Roger Owen =

Roger Owen may refer to:

- Roger Owen (historian) (1935–2018), British historian
- Roger Owen (rugby) (1953–2021), Welsh rugby union, and rugby league footballer of the 1970s and 1980s
- Roger Owen (MP) (1573–1617), English Member of Parliament
- Roger Carmichael Robert Owen (1866–1941), British military officer
- Roger Owen (lawyer) (died 1984), Irish lawyer and Crown official
