= Edward Fitz-Symon =

Irish judge

Edward Fitz-Symon (c. 1530–1593) was a leading Irish barrister and judge of the Elizabethan era. He held the offices of Attorney General for Ireland and Serjeant-at-law (Ireland) and was very briefly Master of the Rolls in Ireland. Despite his appointment to these senior offices, he was derided by his contemporaries as being a man of "mean learning". His family were Lords of the Manor of Baldoyle for several generations.

== Family ==
Fitz-Symon was born in Dublin. Little seems to be known of his parentage, although the surname Fitzsimon is quite common in Ireland. An earlier bearer of the name was the explorer Symon Semeonis (aka Simon FitzSimon or Simon FitzSimmons). Walter Fitzsimon, son of Robert Fitzsimon of Dublin, was Archbishop of Dublin 1484-1511. James Stanyhurst, Recorder of Dublin and Speaker of the Irish House of Commons in three Tudor period parliaments, married Anne Fitzsimon, daughter of Thomas Fitzsimon, his predecessor as Recorder of Dublin.

== Career ==
Edward entered the Inner Temple in 1555. For no very clear reason, the Crown gave him a pension of £4 a year "so long as he abode at the Inns of Court". He had returned to Ireland to practice at the Irish Bar by 1563. He was justice of the Liberties of Wexford and Commissioner for Munster. In 1570 he was made Attorney General, and in 1574 he became Serjeant-at-law, holding that office until his death in 1593. In 1578 when the controversial judge Nicholas White was removed from office as Master of the Rolls, Fitz-Symon replaced him. He was a surprising choice, since Irish serjeants-at-law in that era rarely became judges, due to Queen Elizabeth I's generally low opinion of her Irish law officers. In any case, the appointment was only a temporary one since White was restored to office within a few months.

We have some glimpses of Fitz-Symon's official work: in 1577, during the height of the "cess" controversy, concerning the power of the Crown to levy taxes on the Anglo-Irish gentry of the Pale for the upkeep of military garrisons, the Lord Chancellor of Ireland, Sir William Gerard, called on him to give an important opinion on the royal prerogative. On another occasion he was asked to advise on a commission to reform the customs at Chester, but refused on the ground that he did not have adequate time. Gerard was clearly unimpressed by Fitz-Symon's abilities, calling him a man "of mean learning" (he thought poorly of Irish officials generally).

Fitz-Symon pleaded regularly before the Court of Castle Chamber, the Irish equivalent of Star Chamber, and often sat in a quasi-judicial capacity. In 1572 he sat on a commission to inquire into the extent of the former lands of the O'Doyne clan, and decide whether they should be incorporated into Queen's County. Later the same year he sat on the commission to oversee the muster of troops in Dublin. In 1584 he served on a commission to inquire into all persons who had been attainted for treason in seven counties, and in 1588 sat on a commission to inquire into what lands in Sligo were held from the Queen by the Clan O Connor Sligo. He died late in 1593, though his successor Arthur Corye was not appointed until the following May.

== Personal life ==
Fitz-Symon is said to have made a considerable fortune: he leased Grange Abbey, Baldoyle, from Dublin Corporation, and in 1575 he sent £100, then a large sum, to his son Christopher, who was a student in London.

The Fitz-Symon family remained at the Grange for several generations: Thomas Fitzsimmons of the Grange, who rebuilt Baldoyle Church in 1609, may have been Edward's grandson. The family suffered confiscation of its estates in 1657 under the Cromwellian regime. The Grange is now a ruin.

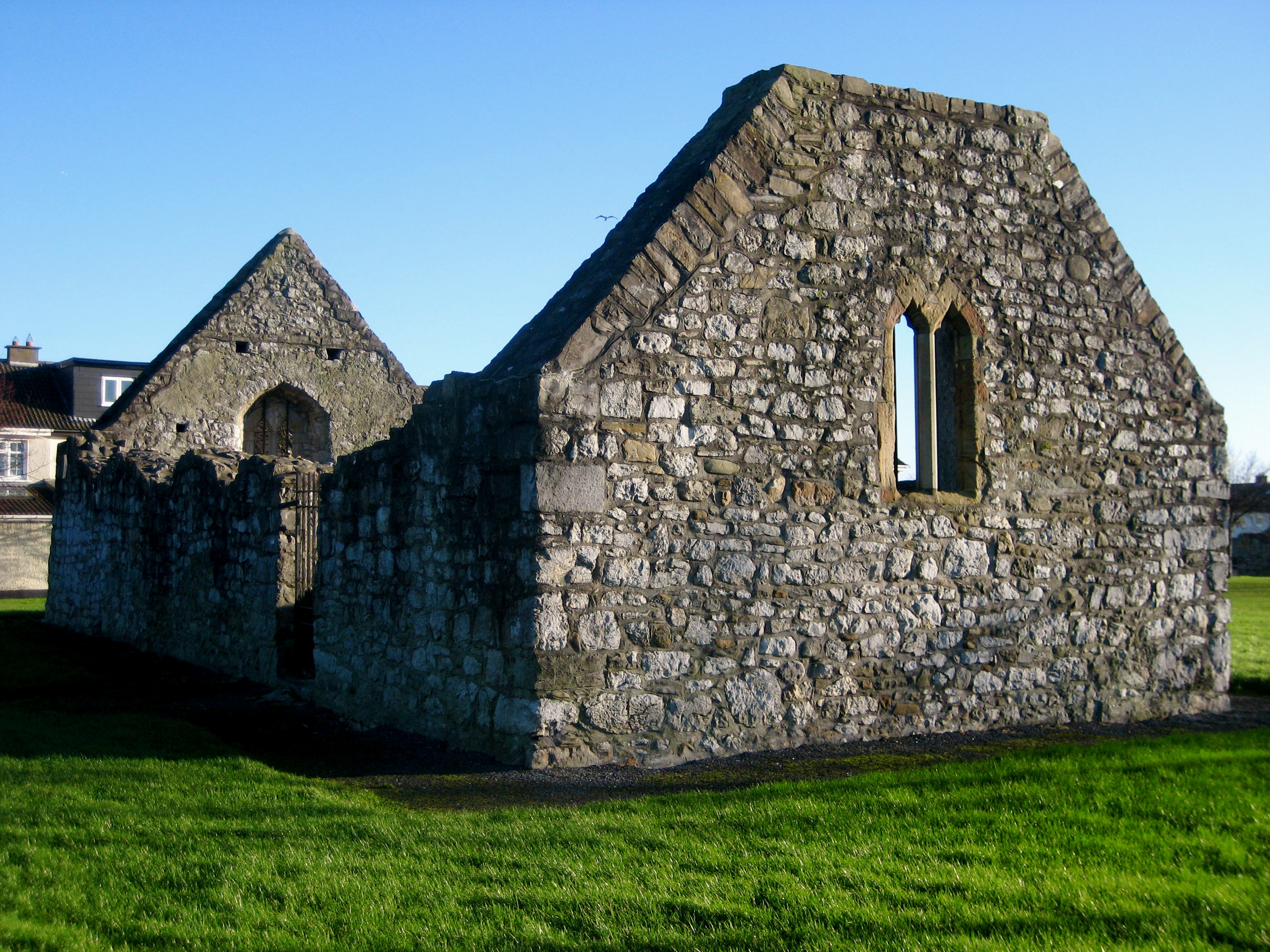
Ruins of Grange Abbey, Baldoyle (the Grange): Fitz-Symon was the tenant of the Grange

== Religion ==
As an office holder, Fitz-Symon was obliged to conform in public to the Church of Ireland, and to swear an oath acknowledging Queen Elizabeth as the rightful Head of the Church, but his real sympathies were with the Roman Catholic faith. His son Christopher wrote to him from London in 1581 to say that he had temporarily left the Inner Temple, due to the recent establishment of a commission to inquire into the religious orthodoxy of all barristers and students who did not attend Anglican service. Clearly, Christopher, an open recusant, expected his father to share his views on the matter. In the next generation, however, the family conformed to the Church of Ireland.

== See also ==
- Symon Semeonis

Legal offices
Preceded by Lucas Dillon	Attorney-General for Ireland; 1570-1574	Succeeded by John Bathe
