= Thomas Rochfort =

Irish judge and clergyman

Sir Thomas Rochfort (c.1450–1522) was a distinguished Irish judge and cleric who held the offices of Solicitor General for Ireland (he was the first recorded holder of that office), Master of the Rolls in Ireland, and Dean of St. Patrick's Cathedral.

== Biography ==
He was born at Killadoon, near Celbridge, County Kildare, the second son of Roger Rochfort, Lord of the Manor of Killadoon, and his wife Catherine Read. The Rochfort family had come to Ireland around 1240; this branch of the family was descended from Sir Milo de Rochfort, who held lands in Kildare in 1309. Roger's elder brother Robert was the ancestor of another distinguished judge, Robert Rochfort, Chief Baron of the Irish Exchequer under Queen Anne, whose descendants held the title Earl of Belvedere. The first Robert was himself a lawyer of some distinction, who was attorney to Richard, Duke of York for his Irish estates.

Little is known of Thomas's career before 1502 when he became Precentor of St. Patrick's Cathedral; he became Dean in 1505. He was an active and reforming Dean who laid down important new rules on the jurisdiction and discipline of the cathedral, and it was during his tenure as Dean that the Cathedral College of Minor Canons and Choristers was incorporated.

He was reputed to be "a man learned in the law": which no doubt explains why, rather unusually for a cleric, he became Serjeant-at-law (Ireland) and Solicitor General in 1511 (his Uncle Robert had also been a lawyer of repute). He is the first person named as holding the office of Solicitor General for Ireland, but no conclusions can be drawn about the earlier existence of that office, as many of the records have disappeared. Subsequently, he became clerk of the Irish Court of Chancery, and then Master of the Rolls in Ireland. As often in this period, the exact dates he held office are uncertain. He was certainly still Master in 1520 but was superseded the following year. He remained Dean of St. Patrick's until his death in June 1522. Hart describes Rochfort's judicial career as unique in his lifetime, as he was the only cleric of his generation who held any judicial office other than that of Lord Chancellor of Ireland. He also received a knighthood, which was not a common honour for a priest.
