= Patrick Barnewall (judge) =

Irish judge and politician

Patrick Barnewall (c. 1500–1552) was a leading figure in the Irish Government of the 1530s and 1540s. He owed his position largely to his close links with Thomas Cromwell. He sat in the Irish House of Commons as MP for County Dublin, and held the offices of Solicitor General for Ireland and Master of the Rolls in Ireland. Today he is mainly remembered for his role in founding the King's Inns. He belonged to a junior branch of the family of Lord Trimlestown: his own descendants held the title Viscount Barnewall of Kingsland.

== Background ==
He was the eldest son of Roger Barnewall of Fieldstown or Fedleston, Clonmethan, County Dublin, a member of the Kingsland branch of the prominent Barnewall family; Roger had married his cousin Alison, daughter of Christopher, 2nd Baron Trimlestown and Elizabeth Plunket, and sister of John Barnewall, 3rd Baron Trimlestown, later Lord Chancellor of Ireland. Patrick's choice of a legal career no doubt owed something to his uncle's example; he is also said to have been greatly influenced, at least in the early years, by his brother-in-law Thomas Luttrell, later Chief Justice of the Irish Common Pleas. His most important political connection was Thomas Cromwell, whom he probably met in London in the 1520s. Patrick was at Gray's Inn in 1527, and is known to have taken part in the legal debates there. He returned to Ireland soon afterwards to practice at the Irish Bar. He acted as an agent for the family of Anne Boleyn, who had inherited substantial lands in Ireland through their relationship with the Butler dynasty.

== Solicitor General ==
His appointment as King's Sergeant and as Solicitor General in 1534 was largely due to the patronage of Cromwell, who actively promoted the careers of Barnewall and his brother-in-law Sir Thomas Luttrell, and recommended Barnewall in particular for high office as being a man of "integrity and learning". His main rivals for power were the Cowleys, who were clients of the Earl of Ormond. In 1535 Barnewall obtained the lucrative posts of Collector of Customs for Dublin and Drogheda, only to lose them to Walter and Robert Cowley. Walter also aimed for Barnewall's other offices, and in 1536 Barnewall went so far as to write an abject letter to Cromwell offering to surrender all of them. In the event a new office of Principal Solicitor for Ireland was created for Cowley; Barnewall retained his seniority and his influence. No doubt emboldened by his success, he beat off a tentative proposal from a four-man commission on law reform to expand the role of the Attorney-General, which would possibly have involved abolishing the office of Serjeant. Showing himself to be a believer in the status quo, he argued that: "the King's Serjeant has always used to maintain the pleas... for this two hundred years and more". By own account he was heavily involved in arguing lawsuits on behalf of the Crown before the Lord Chancellor, but there is evidence that his other duties made his attendance in Court irregular: in 1537 John Bolter, a goldsmith, complained to Cromwell that his own case before the Lord Chancellor was being adjourned from one law term to the next at Barnewall's request. It has been suggested that the favourable treatment he received from the judges was probably due partly to the fact that he was related to several of them. He sat in the Irish House of Commons as the member for County Dublin in the Parliament of 1536–7; despite his heavy obligations to the Crown, he initially opposed the Protestant Reformation. In 1540 he was in England discussing Parliamentary business and was recommended to the Crown as a man of integrity and learning, and an expert on the situation in the Pale.

== Silken Thomas Rebellion- aftermath ==
The rebellion of Silken Thomas was to involve Barnewall in the delicate task of pleading with Henry VIII for a general pardon on behalf of the Anglo-Irish gentry, many of whom were under suspicion of having supported the rebellion. Barnewall himself apparently had no sympathy for the rebel cause, although his enemy Walter Cowley tried hard to persuade Cromwell that he had. His uncle Lord Trimlestown had, probably with more reason, been accused of wavering in his loyalty, but Cromwell was evidently prepared to overlook this. Given the close ties of blood and marriage which existed between nearly all the Anglo-Irish families of the Pale, it was reasonable that Barnewall, with his considerable influence at the English Court, should be asked by his relatives and neighbours to go to England to plead for a pardon, and he agreed to do so. He was accompanied by Sir Robert Dillon (died 1580), the Attorney General for Ireland, who, though technically Barnewall's superior, seems to have been very much the junior partner on the mission.

It has been suggested that he was exposing himself to great danger since there was a risk that the King would interpret any plea for mercy as evidence of his support for the rebels. However, he used his influence with Cromwell to good effect, and during his visit to London in 1536-7 he succeeded in obtaining a general royal pardon for those involved or suspected of involvement in the rebellion.

In 1537 he accompanied the Lord Deputy of Ireland, Leonard Grey, 1st Viscount Grane, to Limerick, to assist in a military campaign against the O'Byrnes.

== Dissolution of the Monasteries ==
Barnewall and Dillon at the same time as they were pleading for the suspected rebels were entrusted with a second mission to the King, which was to deal with the dissolution of the monasteries in Ireland, which raised quite different issues in Ireland than in England. Much monastic land in Ireland had passed into lay hands through leases and alienations, and the threat to dissolve the monasteries was therefore unwelcome to the landowners of the Pale, including Barnewall himself, who was the steward for seven manors in Ireland which were owned by the Abbey of Keynsham in Somerset. He became the effective leader of the opposition in the Irish House of Commons to the plan to dissolve the Irish monasteries and was asked to raise the matter with the King. This was another very delicate matter, since Henry VIII was not noted for tolerating opposition to his wishes, while the Cowley family were busily spreading the story that Barnewall had challenged the King's authority to dissolve any religious house. Again however Barnewall's friendship with Cromwell was decisive and the plan to dissolve the Irish houses was abandoned in the short term.

The reprieve for the Irish monasteries was brief, and Barnewall, like most of his fellow landowners (including Robert Dillon), soon abandoned his opposition to their dissolution. He sat on the commission for the surrender of the Irish monasteries during 1539–1541 and did well personally out of their suppression. It has been argued that he received a smaller reward than some of his colleagues, but in 1541 he bought the estates of the Abbey of Grace Dieu in County Dublin, and the following year those of the Carmelite priory of Knocktopher in County Kilkenny. In 1547 he obtained a lease of the possessions of St. Patrick's Cathedral, Dublin. On the death of the widow of Patrick Sherle of Shallon, County Meath and his widow, Patrick was given wardship of their children, John and Marion. Marion, who inherited the family estates on John's death, married Patrick's son and heir Christopher.

== King's Inns ==
Barnewall is now chiefly remembered for his role in establishing the King's Inns. Again his friendship with Cromwell played an important part in furthering the project: on several occasions, Barnewall raised with Cromwell the need for the establishment in Dublin of a college for the education of lawyers; and in April 1538 he wrote that as he had previously declared; "if your lordship thought it meet that there should be a house of chancery here, where such as were [inclined] towards the law and other young gentlemen, might be together, I reckon it would do much good".

His vision seems to have been of an Irish equivalent of the Inns of Court, where those young men inclined "towards the law" i.e. law students, would mix socially with "other young gentlemen" who would spend a number of legal terms at the Inn, just as in England many young men of good birth spent some time at the Inns of Court, not with any intention of practising the legal profession, but in order to make useful social contacts and gain a working familiarity with the law. Like most of the Anglo-Irish gentry (even those, like Barnewall himself and his brother-in-law Thomas Luttrell, who spoke fluent Irish) Barnewall also believed firmly in the civilising effect of English culture on the Irish people and argued that the new Inn would encourage the use of the English language, as well as English customs and practice.

It is not known if Cromwell responded, but Barnewall continued to press the matter even after Cromwell's downfall. He was one of the original lessees named in the lease of Blackfriars (the property comprising the present-day King's Inns) by the King in 1541 (as was his uncle Robert Barnewall, a barrister whose ambition for high office was never fulfilled); and he was among those who signed the petition to the Privy Council later that year asking for the title to the property to be confirmed.

== Judge ==
Barnewall was a key figure in the Irish Government during the years 1536–41, but thereafter his influence declined, no doubt largely due to Cromwell's downfall and execution in 1540, although on a visit to England that year he was highly commended by the Crown. Unlike his uncle and his brother-in-law he failed to achieve elevation to the office of Lord Chancellor of Ireland or Chief Justice of any of the courts of common law; he had hoped to be Chief Baron of the Irish Exchequer, but was passed over in favour of Richard Delahide, despite the fact that Delahide, unlike Barnewall, was deeply implicated in the Silken Thomas rebellion. He did sit as an extra judge of assizes in Munster, but had to wait until 1550 to become Master of the Rolls, then a comparatively junior and largely administrative post, and he died only two years later. One of his last acts was to persuade the Privy Council to order that the Chancery rolls, for whose safekeeping he was responsible as Master, be stored in the Library of the former St. Patrick's Cathedral, (suppressed in 1547, but restored in 1555) as there was no other secure and suitable place to keep them.

== Character ==
Barnewall has been described as a "redoubtable figure" who was noted for his integrity and learning. Kenny describes him as an astute politician. Hart agrees with this verdict and notes the crucial role Barnewall played in Government; probably no other Solicitor General in Irish history ever approached his influence. If his opposition to the suppression of the monasteries was self-interested, it nonetheless took considerable nerve; he also deserves credit for the courage he showed by his willingness to plead with Henry VIII for a general pardon for those gentry suspected of rebellion.

== Family ==
Barnewall married, before 1522, Anne Luttrell, daughter of Richard Luttrell of Luttrellstown Castle and Margaret Fitzlyons and sister of Thomas Luttrell, the future Lord Chief Justice of the Common Pleas. They had two children:

- Sir Christopher Barnewall, an extremely popular member of Parliament and Sheriff of County Dublin, and ancestor of the Viscounts Barnewall
- Margaret, who married a cousin, also called Patrick Barnewall.
