= Robert Ball (mayor) =

Irish politician

Robert Ball (died 25 January 1635) was Mayor of Dublin from 1609 to 1610.

Robert Ball was one of the four children born to Walter Ball and Eleanor Ussher. He came from two influential families that had already produced several mayors and councillors.

In his first marriage, he was married to Jenet Ussher (died 1620), daughter of the Anglican bishop Henry Ussher and a third cousin. He later married Margaret Barry.

Civic offices
Preceded by John Cusacke	Mayor of Dublin; 1609–1610	Succeeded by Richard Barrye
