= Serjeant-at-law =

Member of an order of barristers at the English and Irish bar

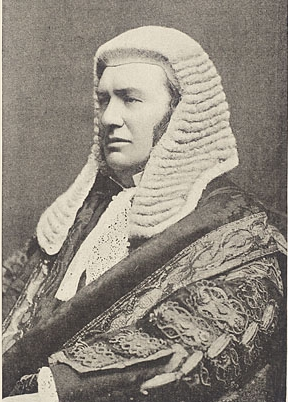
Lord Lindley, the last English Serjeant-at-Law

A Serjeant-at-Law (SL), commonly known simply as a Serjeant, was a member of an order of barristers at the English and Irish Bar. The position of Serjeant-at-Law (servientes ad legem), or Sergeant-Counter, was centuries old: there are writs dating to 1300 which identify them as descended from figures in France before the Norman Conquest; thus the Serjeants are said to be the oldest formally created order in England. The order rose during the 16th century as a small, elite group of lawyers who took much of the work in the central common law courts.

With the creation of Queen's Counsel or "Queen's Counsel Extraordinary" (King's Counsel during a male monarch's rule) during the reign of Elizabeth I, the order gradually began to decline, with each monarch opting to create more King's or Queen's Counsel. The Serjeants' exclusive jurisdictions were ended during the 19th century and, with the Judicature Act 1873 coming into force in 1875, it was felt that there was no need to have such figures, and no more were created. The last appointed was Nathaniel Lindley, later a Law Lord, who retired in 1905 and died in 1921. The number of Irish Serjeants-at-law was limited to three (originally one, later two). The last appointment was A. M. Sullivan in 1912; after his 1921 relocation to the English bar he remained "Serjeant Sullivan" as a courtesy title.

The Serjeants had for many centuries exclusive jurisdiction over the Court of Common Pleas, being the only lawyers allowed to argue a case there. At the same time, they had rights of audience in the other central common law courts (the Court of King's Bench and Exchequer of Pleas) and precedence over all other lawyers. Only Serjeants-at-Law could become judges of these courts until the 19th century, and socially the Serjeants ranked above Knights Bachelor and Companions of the Bath. Within the Serjeants-at-Law were distinct orders: the King's Serjeants, particularly favoured Serjeants-at-Law, and within that the King's Premier Serjeant, the Monarch's most favoured Serjeant, and the King's Ancient Serjeant, the oldest. Serjeants (except King's Serjeants) were created by writs of summons under the Great Seal of the Realm, and wore a distinctive dress, the chief feature of which was the coif, a white lawn or silk skullcap. From the 14th century onwards, a black skullcap was worn over the coif, and when wigs were adopted by the legal profession, the serjeants continued to wear the coif and skullcap in the form of small circular patches of black fabric over white fabric on top of their wigs.

Although the Serjeants are extinct as a class of advocates, the title The Serjeant-at-Law in the Common Hall is still given to the judge generally known as the Common Serjeant of London.

== History ==
=== Early history ===
The history of Serjeants-at-Law goes back to within a century of the Norman Conquest; Alexander Pulling argues that Serjeants-at-Law existed "before any large portion of our law was formed", and Edward Warren agrees that they existed (in Normandy), supporting him with a Norman writ from approximately 1300 which identifies Serjeants-at-Law as directly descending from Norman conteurs; indeed, they were sometimes known as Serjeant-Conteurs. The members of the Order initially used St Paul's Cathedral as their meeting place, standing near the "parvis" where they would give counsel to those who sought advice. Geoffrey Chaucer makes reference to the Serjeants in the Canterbury Tales, General Prologue, writing:

A serjeant of the law, ware and wise,
That often hadde ben at the parvis,
Ther was also, full rich of excellence.
Discreet he was and of great reverence,
He sened swiche; his wordes were so wise,
Justice he was ful often in assise,
By patent, and by pleine commissiun;
For his science, and for his high renoun,
Of fees and robes had he many on.

Firm evidence for existence of legal serjeants in England dates from the reign of Henry III. As such it is the oldest royally created order; the next is the Order of the Garter, created in 1330. Serjeants at Law existed in Ireland from at least 1302, and were appointed by letters patent. Henry de Bracton claimed that, for the trial of Hubert de Burgh in 1239 the king was assisted by "all the serjeants of the bench", although it is not known who they were. By the 1270s there were approximately 20 recorded Serjeants; by 1290, 36. This period also saw the first regulation of Serjeants, with a statutory power from 1275 to suspend from practise any Serjeant who misbehaved (enacted as chapter 29 of the Statute of Westminster 1275). The exclusive jurisdiction Serjeants-at-Law held over the Court of Common Pleas slowly came about during the 1320s, squeezing the size of the bar until only a consistent group reappeared. From this period, Serjeants also began to be called in regular groups, rather than individually on whatever date was felt appropriate.

=== Rise ===
During the 16th century the Serjeants-at-Law were a small, though highly respected and powerful, elite. There were never more than ten alive, and on several occasions the number dwindled to one; William Bendlowes bragged that he had been "the only Serjeant-at-Law in England" in 1559. Over these 100 years, only 89 Serjeants were created. At the time they were the only clearly distinguishable branch of the legal profession, and it is thought that their work may have actually created barristers as a separate group; although Serjeants were the only lawyers who normally argued in court, they occasionally allowed other lawyers to help them in special cases. These lawyers became known as outer or "utter" barristers (because they were confined to the outer bar of the court); if they were allowed to act they had "passed the bar" towards becoming a Serjeant-at-Law.

Despite holding a monopoly on cases in the Court of Common Pleas, Serjeants also took most of the business in the Court of King's Bench. Although required to make the Common Pleas their principal place of work, there is evidence of Serjeants who did not; one, Robert Mennell, worked entirely in the North of England after his creation in 1547 and was not known in Westminster, where the Common Pleas was located. This was also a time of great judicial success for the Serjeants; since only Serjeants could be appointed to the common law courts, many also sat in the Exchequer of Pleas, a court of equity. This period was not a time of success for the profession overall, however, despite the brisk business being done. The rise of central courts other than the Common Pleas allowed other lawyers to gain advocacy experience and work, drawing it away from the Serjeants, and at the same time the few Serjeants could not handle all the business in the Common Pleas, allowing the rise of barristers as dedicated advocates.

=== Decline and abolition ===
The decline of the Serjeants-at-Law started in 1596, when Francis Bacon persuaded Elizabeth I to appoint him "Queen's Counsel Extraordinary" (QC), a new creation which gave him precedence over the Serjeants. This was not a formal creation, in that he was not granted a patent of appointment, but in 1604 James I saw fit to finally award this. The creation of Queen's (or King's) Counsel was initially small; James I created at least one other, and Charles I four. Following the English Restoration this increased, with a few appointed each year. The largest change came about with William IV, who appointed an average of nine a year, and following him approximately 12 were created a year, with an average of 245 at any one time.

Every new Queen's Counsel created reduced the Serjeants in importance, since even the most junior QC took precedence over the most senior Serjeant. Although appointments were still made to the Serjeants-at-Law, the King's Serjeant and the King's Ancient Serjeant, and several Serjeants were granted patents of precedence which gave them superiority over QCs, the Victorian era saw a decline in appointments. The rule that all common law judges must be Serjeants was circumvented: anyone chosen to be a judge would be appointed a Serjeant, and immediately thereafter a judge. In 1834 Lord Brougham issued a mandate which opened up pleading in the Court of Common Pleas to every barrister, Serjeant or not, and this was followed for six years until the Serjeants successfully petitioned the Queen to overturn it as invalid.

The Serjeants only enjoyed their returned status for another six years, however, before Parliament intervened. The Practitioners in Common Pleas Act 1846, from 18 August 1846, allowed all barristers to practise in the Court of Common Pleas. The next and final blow was the Judicature Act 1873, which came into force on 1 November 1875. Section 8 provided that common law judges need no longer be appointed from the Serjeants-at-Law, removing the need to appoint judicial Serjeants. With this Act and the rise of the Queen's Counsel, there was no longer any need to appoint Serjeants, and the practice ended.

The last English serjeant at the bar, the "rather undistinguished" Frederick Lowten Spinks, died in 1899. The last English serjeant was Nathaniel Lindley, Baron Lindley, who had been made a serjeant so that he could be appointed a judge of the Common Pleas. He died in 1921.

The equivalent Irish rank of Serjeant-at-law survived until 1919. Alexander Sullivan, the last Irish serjeant, spent the second half of his career at the English bar, and as a matter of courtesy was always addressed as Serjeant.

== Organisation ==
=== Serjeant's Inn ===
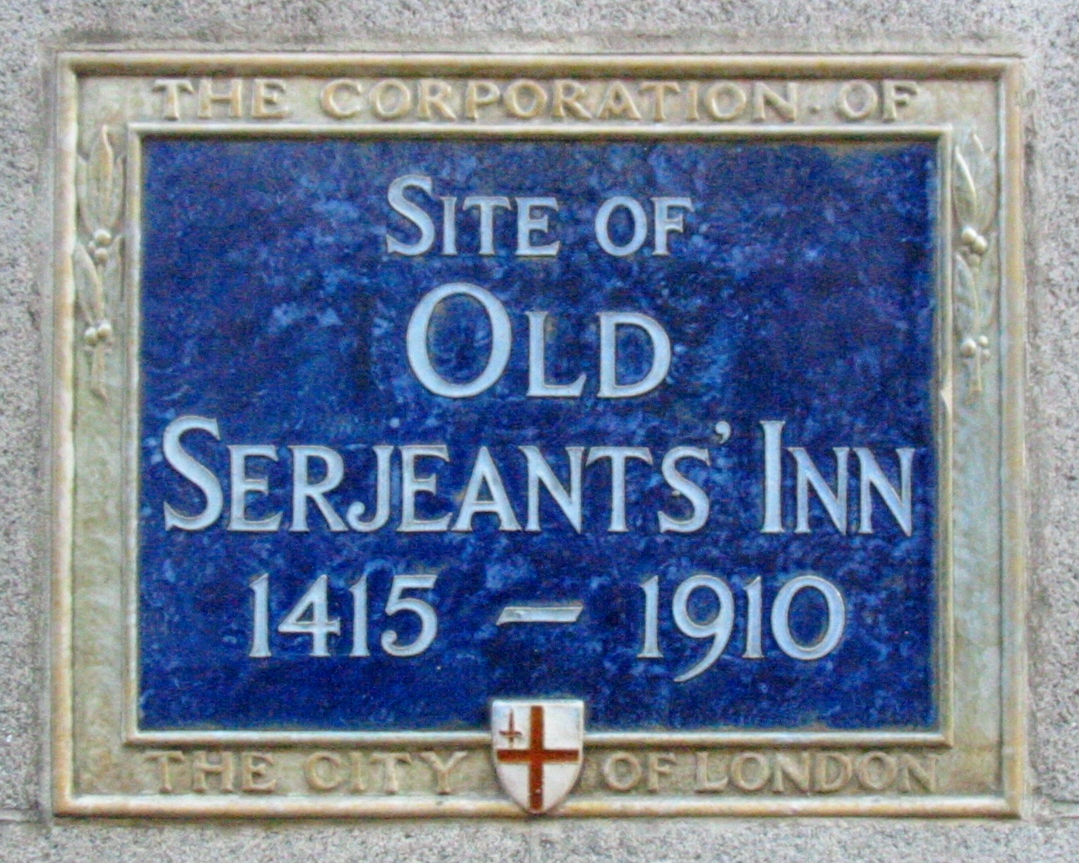
A plaque marks the site of Old Serjeant's Inn in Chancery Lane.

Serjeant's Inn was a legal inn restricted to Serjeants-at-Law. It operated from three locations, one in Holborn, known as Scroope's Inn, which was abandoned by 1498 for the one in Fleet Street, which was pulled down during the 18th century, and one on Chancery Lane, pulled down in 1877. The Inn was a voluntary association, and although most Serjeants joined upon being appointed they were not required to. There were rarely more than 40 Serjeants, even including members of the judiciary, and the Inns were noticeably smaller than the Inns of Court. Unlike the Inns of Court, Serjeant's Inn was a private establishment similar to a gentlemen's club.

The Inn on Fleet Street existed from at least 1443, when it was rented from the Dean of York. By the 16th century it had become the main Inn, before being burnt down during the Great Fire of London. It was rebuilt by 1670, but the end finally came in 1733. The Fleet Street Inn had fallen into a "ruinous state", and the Serjeants had been unable to obtain a renewal of their lease. They abandoned the property, and it returned to the Dean.

The property on Chancery Lane consisted of a Hall, dining room, a library, kitchens and offices for the Serjeants-at-Law. This Inn was originally known as "Skarle's Inn" from about 1390, named after John Scarle, who became Master of the Rolls in 1394. By 1404 it was known as "Farringdon's Inn", but although the Serjeants were in full possession by 1416 it was not until 1484 that the property became known as Serjeant's Inn. Newly promoted Serjeants had to pay £350 in the 19th century, while those promoted solely to take up judicial office had to pay £500. The Hall was a large room hung with portraits of various famous judges and Serjeants-at-Law, with three windows on one side each containing the coat of arms of a distinguished judge. Around the room were the coats of arms of various Serjeants, which were given to their descendants when the Inn was finally sold. When the Fleet Street Inn was abandoned, this location became the sole residence of the Serjeants. With the demise of the order after the Supreme Court of Judicature Act 1873, there was no way to support the Inn, and it was sold in 1877 for £57,100. The remaining Serjeants were accepted into their former Inns of Court, where judicial Serjeants were made Benchers and normal Serjeants barristers.

=== Call to the Coif ===
The process of being called to the order of Serjeants-at-Law stayed fairly constant. The traditional method was that the Serjeants would discuss among themselves prospective candidates, and then make recommendations to the Chief Justice of the Common Pleas. He would pass these names on to the Lord Chancellor, who would appoint the new Serjeants. This was intended to provide a way to select possible judges in a period where political favouritism was rampant – since only Serjeants could become judges, making sure that Serjeants were not political appointees was seen to provide for a neutral judiciary. Serjeants were traditionally appointed by a writ directly from the King. The writ was issued under the Great Seal of the Realm and required "the elected and qualified apprentices of the law to take the state and degree of a Serjeant-at-Law". The newly created Serjeants would then assemble in one of the Inns of Court, where they would hear a speech from the Lord Chancellor or Lord Chief Justice and be given a purse of gold. The Coif was then placed on the Serjeant's head. The Serjeants were required to swear an oath, which was that they would:

serve the King's people as one of the Serjeants-at-law, and you shall truly counsel them that you be retained with after your cunning; and you shall not defer or delay their causes willingly, for covetness of money, or other thing that may turn you to profit; and you shall give due attendance accordingly. So help you God.

The new Serjeants would give a feast to celebrate, and gave out rings to their close friends and family to mark the occasion. The King, the Lord Chancellor and other figures also received rings. The major courts would be suspended for the day, and the other Serjeants, judges, leaders of the Inns of Court and occasionally the King would attend. Serjeant's Inn and the Inns of Court were not big enough for such an occasion, and Ely Place or Lambeth Palace would instead be used. The feasts gradually declined in importance, and by the 17th century they were small enough to be held in the Inns. The last recorded feast was in 1736 in Middle Temple, when fourteen new Serjeants were raised to the Coif.

=== Robes ===
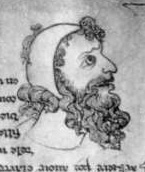
An example of a coif

The traditional clothing of a Serjeant-at-Law consisted of a coif, a robe and a furred cloak. The robe and cloak were later adapted into the robe worn by judges. The cut and colour of this robe varied – records from the King's Privy Wardrobe show judges being instructed to wear robes of scarlet, green, purple and miniver, and Serjeants being ordered to wear the same. In 1555 new Serjeants were required to have robes of scarlet, brown, blue, mustard and murrey. By the time the order came to an end the formal robes were red, but Mr. Serjeant Robinson recalled that, towards the end days of the order, black silk gowns were the everyday court garb and the red gown was worn only on certain formal occasions. The cape was originally a cloak worn separately from the robe, but gradually made its way into the uniform as a whole. John Fortescue described the cape as the "main ornament of the order", distinguished only from the cape worn by judges because it was furred with lambskin rather than miniver. The capes were not worn into court by the advocates, only by the serjeants.

The coif was the main symbol of the Order of Serjeants-at-Law, and is where their most recognisable name (the Order of the Coif) comes from. The coif was white and made of either silk or lawn. A Serjeant was never obliged to take off or cover his coif, not even in the presence of the King, except as a judge when passing a death sentence. In that situation he would wear a black cap intended to cover the coif, although it is often confused with the coif itself. When wigs were first introduced for barristers and judges it caused some difficulty for Serjeants, who were not allowed to cover the coif. Wigmakers got around this by adding a small white cloth to the top of the wig, representing the coif. A small black piece of cloth was worn over the white cloth, representing the skullcap that the serjeants had begun wearing over their coifs in the 14th century.

=== King's or Queen's Serjeants ===
A King's or Queen's Serjeant was a Serjeant-at-Law appointed to serve the Crown as a legal adviser to the monarch and their government in the same way as the Attorney General for England and Wales. The King's Serjeant (who had the postnominal KS, or QS during the reign of a female monarch) would represent the Crown in court, acting as prosecutor in criminal cases and representative in civil ones, and would have higher powers and ranking in the lower courts than the Attorney- or Solicitor General. King's Serjeants also worked as legal advisers in the House of Lords, and were not allowed to act in cases against the Crown or do anything that would harm it; in 1540 Humfrey (or Humphrey) Browne, serjeant at law, was heavily punished for creating a tax avoidance scheme. The King's Serjeants would wear a black Coif with a narrow strip of white, unlike the all-white Coif of a normal Serjeant. The King's Serjeants were required to swear a second oath to serve "The King and his people", rather than "The King's people" as a Serjeant-at-Law would swear. The King's favoured Serjeant would become the King's Premier Serjeant, while the oldest one was known as the King's Ancient Serjeant.

=== Precedence, status and rights of audience ===
For almost all of their history, Serjeants at Law and King's Serjeants were the only advocates given rights of audience in the Court of Common Pleas. Until the 17th century they were also first in the order of precedence in the Court of King's Bench and Court of Chancery, which gave them priority in motions before the court. Serjeants also had the privilege of being immune from most normal forms of lawsuit – they could only be sued by a writ from the Court of Chancery. It was held as an extension of this that servants of Serjeants could only be sued in the Common Pleas. As part of the Court of Common Pleas the Serjeants also performed some judicial duties, such as levying fines. In exchange for these privileges, Serjeants were expected to fulfil certain duties; firstly, that they represent anybody who asked regardless of their ability to pay, and secondly that, due to the small number of judges, they serve as deputy judges to hear cases when there was no judge available.

Only Serjeants-at-Law could become judges of the common law courts; this rule came into being in the 14th century for the Courts of Common Pleas and King's Bench, and was extended to the Exchequer of Pleas in the 16th century; it did not apply to the Court of Chancery, a court of equity, or the Ecclesiastical Courts. The Serjeants-at-Law also had social privileges; they ranked above Knights Bachelor and Companions of the Bath, and their wives had the right to be addressed as "Lady —", in the same way as the wives of knights or baronets. A Serjeant made a King's Counsel or judge would still retain these social privileges. As the cream of the legal profession, Serjeants earned higher fees than normal barristers.

In the order of precedence King's Serjeants came before all other barristers, even the Attorney-General, until the introduction of King's Counsel. This state of affairs came to an end as a result of two changes – firstly, during the reign of James I, when a royal patent gave the Attorney General precedence over all King's Serjeants "except the two ancientiest", and secondly in 1814 when the Attorney General of the time was a barrister and the Solicitor General (politically junior to the Attorney General) a King's Serjeant. To reflect the political reality, the Attorney General was made superior to any King's Serjeant, and this remained until the order of Serjeants-at-Law finally died out.

== In literature ==
The main character in C. J. Sansom's Shardlake novels, hunchback lawyer Matthew Shardlake, is a Serjeant-at-Law during the reign of King Henry VIII of England.

== Bibliography ==
- Baker, John Hamilton (2003). The Oxford history of the laws of England. Vol. 7. Oxford University Press. ISBN 0-19-825817-8.
- Baker, John Hamilton (1984). The order of serjeants at law: a chronicle of creations, with related texts and a historical introduction. Selden Society Supplementary series vol. 5. Selden Society.
- Bellot, Hugh (1902). The Inner and Middle Temple, legal, literary, and historic associations. London: Methuen & Co. OCLC 585828.
- Haydn, Joseph (1851). The book of dignities: containing rolls of the official personages of the British Empire from the earliest periods to the present time together with the sovereigns of Europe, from the foundation of their respective states; the peerage of England and Great Britain. Longmans. OCLC 792830069.
- Megarry, Robert (1972). Inns Ancient and Modern. Selden Society. ISBN 0-85490-006-3.
- Pollock, Jonathan Frederick (1829). Copy of the first report made to His Majesty by the commissioners appointed to inquire into the practice and proceedings of the superior courts of common law. House of Commons.
- Pulling, Alexander (1884). The Order of the Coif. William Clows & Sons Ltd. OCLC 2049459.
- Robinson, Benjamin Coulson (1894). Bench and Bar: Reminiscences of One of the Last of an Ancient Race. London: Hurst and Blackett. OCLC 60719596.
- von Kynell, Kurt (2000). Saxon and medieval antecedents of the English common law. Edwin Mellen Press. ISBN 0-7734-7873-6.
- Warren, Edward (1942). "Serjeants-at-Law; The Order of the Coif". Virginia Law Review. 28 (7). University of Virginia School of Law: 911–950. doi:10.2307/1068630. ISSN 0042-6601. JSTOR 1068630.
