= John Howley (lawyer) =

Irish barrister and Law Officer

Sir John Bourke Howley (1789-1866) was an Irish barrister and Law Officer who held office as Serjeant-at-law (Ireland) for many years. Despite his obvious desire to be promoted to the Bench, he never became a judge.

He was born at Rich Hill, County Limerick, the second son of John Howley and Anna Bourke, daughter of William Bourke of Pallas, County Tipperary. The Howleys were Roman Catholic merchants from Limerick city (according to family tradition they moved there from Connacht) who prospered in business. John's father bought Rich Hill in the early 19th century.

== Career ==
He was called to the Bar in 1815, became King's Counsel in 1835 and a Bencher of the King's Inns in 1843. He became Third Serjeant in 1843, Second Serjeant in 1851 and First Serjeant from 1851 until his death. He was also appointed Chairman of the Quarter Sessions for County Tipperary, a position which was normally given to a practising barrister with no other official post. He was an active and conscientious magistrate, who devoted much time and effort to suppressing faction fighting, a serious social menace in Ireland at the time, and received a personal letter of commendation from King William IV as a result. However, he claimed that his fellow magistrates gave him no support, and indeed actively thwarted him, as they themselves were responsible for creating the factions which led to the feuds.

He was severely criticised for "legal pluralism": some of the attacks on him may reflect an objection by conservative Protestants to the increasing number of Roman Catholic judges and Law Officers, but other attacks simply reflect the fact that he was not highly regarded as a lawyer. No doubt for that reason he never became a judge, although Benjamin Disraeli, who admired him, proposed in 1859 that he be appointed judge of the Irish Court of Bankruptcy when, as was expected to happen shortly, the office fell vacant. The office did fall vacant soon after, but Howley was passed over. In 1865 he was knighted, a very unusual honour for a Serjeant-at-law. This appears to have been in the nature of a "consolation prize", and a recognition that at the age of seventy-six, he could not expect to advance further in his career. He died the following year and is buried in Glasnevin Cemetery.

== Family ==
He married Sarah Roche, daughter of Stephen Roche of Lota, County Cork and Sarah O'Brien, and had three daughters, of whom the eldest, Maria, married Alexander Mansfield of Morristown Lattin, County Kildare. A younger daughter Amy (died 1906) married Anthony Cliffe of Bellevue, County Wexford, and had issue including Amy, who married Randolph Stewart, 11th Earl of Galloway.

== Sources ==
- Benjamin Disraeli "Letters" Vol.7 1857-1859 University of Toronto Press 2004
- Burke's Landed Gentry of Ireland 9th Edition London Harrison and Sons 1899
- Hart, A. R. History of the King's Serjeant at law in Ireland Dublin Four Courts Press 2000
