= Adam Cusack =

Irish landowner, barrister and judge

Adam Cusack (c.1630–1681) was an Irish landowner, barrister and judge of the seventeenth century.

== Family ==
He was born in Rathgar (then in the countryside, but now a suburb of Dublin), the second son of Robert Cusack of Rathgar Castle (which Adam inherited on the death of his elder brother) and his wife Alice, second daughter of Sir George Sexton of Limerick (died 1631), Secretary to the Lord Deputy of Ireland, and his first wife Katherine Osborne. There are also some references to a marriage (probably a first marriage) between Robert and Alice Eustace, sister of Sir Maurice Eustace, the future Lord Chancellor. Robert sat in the Irish House of Commons as MP for Kells in the Parliament of 1639, but was expelled from the House as a Royalist in 1642. Adam was the grandson of John Cusacke (died 1626), a wealthy Dublin merchant who was Lord Mayor of Dublin in 1608–9, and his wife Margaret Gough (née Allen). The Cusacks originally came from Ballymolghan, County Meath. They bought Rathgar Castle from the Segrave family. Their ancestor Richard Cusack is mentioned as being "of Ballymolghan" in official records dated 1508.

== Early career ==
During the Battle of Rathmines in August 1649, Rathgar Castle was surrounded by troops, but was not attacked: Adam and his father were both in the Castle at the time.

He was educated at Trinity College Dublin and became a fellow of the college in 1654. He signed a petition attacking the Provost, William Chappell, Bishop of Cork and Ross, in 1641 as a close political associate of William Laud, Archbishop of Canterbury, who was then in prison awaiting trial for treason: Chappell was removed from office and imprisoned, and left Ireland for good.

Adam entered Lincoln's Inn in 1655, was called to the Bar in 1660, and entered the King's Inn in 1661. His choice of the law as a profession may have been influenced by the fact that James Barry, 1st Baron Barry of Santry, a leading barrister who became Lord Chief Justice of Ireland in 1660, was his cousin, his mother being Adam's paternal aunt Anne Cusacke.

== Judge ==
Adam was appointed second justice of the provincial court of Connacht in 1662 and became the last Chief Justice of Connacht in 1670. On the abolition of that office in 1672 he was appointed a justice of the Court of Common Pleas (Ireland). In the relaxed political atmosphere of the early 1670s his Anglo-Irish background and his notably tolerant attitude to Roman Catholics were not professional disadvantages. His cousin Lord Barry was in fairly good standing at Court, although his health was failing (he was a much older man than Adam). Adam had also the advantage of having married Catherine Keating, daughter of Edmund Keating of Narraghmore, County Kildare and Elizabeth (or Eleanor) Eustace: Catherine was the sister of John Keating, later to be Chief Justice of the Irish Common Pleas, and niece of Maurice Eustace, Lord Chancellor of Ireland 1660–1665.

== Ill health and death ==
The only serious objection to his appointment to the High Court Bench was his health: from early middle age onwards he suffered badly from gout, which became so severe that he was unable to perform his judicial duties for at least two years, and could only travel by coach, being unable to ride a horse. He died, aged only about 50, in 1681, and was buried in St. Audoen's Church, Dublin. In his will, which, according to Elrington Ball, shows his kindly and charitable nature, he left money to the poor of St. Audoen's parish and of Rathfarnham, for the relief of poor prisoners, and bequests to the Bluecoat School at Oxmantown and to the army hospital at Back Lane, off High Street, Dublin.

The bulk of his estate was left to his widow Catherine, who remarried in 1683 the soldier and politician Colonel Nicholas Cusack, son of James Cusack of Cushinstown and Frances Talbot, and great-grandson of Sir Thomas Cusack, Lord Chancellor of Ireland. She and Adam had no children. She died in 1699, and was buried beside her first husband. Her second husband was attainted for treason in 1691, fled to France and died, a Jacobite exile, at Saint-Germain-en-Laye in 1726.

== Rathgar Castle ==
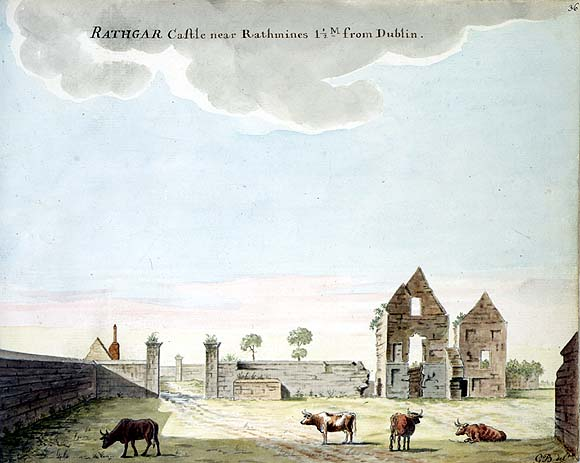
A painting of Rathgar castle by Gabriel Beranger

Rathgar Castle fell into decay in the eighteenth century, and was a ruin by 1769, when the Dutch-born artist Gabriel Beranger did a watercolour which shows two men surveying the remains. The Castle's precise location is something of a mystery, but it probably stood on what is now 44-49 Highfield Road, at the present site of St. Luke's Hospital, Rathgar. It was built by the Segrave family in the sixteenth century, on what had previously been monastic land, and was bought by Adam's grandfather John in 1609.
