= James Robinson (lawyer) =

Irish politician and lawyer

James Robinson (1814–1885) was an Irish barrister and Law Officer. He held all three ranks of Serjeant-at-law but never became a judge.

He was born in Dublin. He was a brother of John Robinson, solicitor and founder of the Dublin Daily Express, a pro-Conservative and Unionist newspaper with a very wide circulation. Sir Joseph Napier, 1st Baronet, Lord Chancellor of Ireland, was a cousin. Hostile critics attributed his professional success entirely to his family connections.

He was educated at Trinity College, Dublin and Gray's Inn, which he entered in 1834. He was called to the Bar in 1836 and took silk in 1852. In 1859 he became Law Adviser to the Lord Lieutenant of Ireland, no doubt on his cousin Napier's recommendation. Critics said that due to family influence, he would soon be made Attorney General for Ireland, despite an abundance of more qualified candidates. In fact, he resigned as Law Adviser after a few months to become Chairman of the Quarter Sessions for County Roscommon, and later acted as Chairman of Quarter Sessions for County Tyrone and County Cavan.

He became Third Irish Serjeant in 1877, Second Serjeant in 1880 and First Serjeant in 1884. He acted regularly as a judge of assize while Serjeant, but was never appointed to the Bench. He died rather suddenly in the late summer of 1885.

He was generally considered to be a fine lawyer, although a bitter anonymous attack on him in the "Irish Quarterly Review" in 1859, evidently written by a political opponent, vilified him as a greedy and grasping man of mediocre abilities who owed everything to his family connections.

== Sources ==
- Hart, A.R. A History of the King's Serjeant-at-law in Ireland Dublin Four Courts Press 2000
- Irish Jurist 1859
- Irish Quarterly Review 1859
