= William Neave =

Irish barrister, politician and law officer

William Neave (c.1662-1713) was an Irish barrister, politician and law officer. He held the office of Serjeant-at-law (Ireland) and in that capacity played a crucial role in the Dublin Castle administration from 1696 to 1711. He sat in the Irish House of Commons in four successive Parliaments as MP for Tulsk.

He was a native of County Longford. He was a highly successful barrister by his early 30s, and quickly took silk. He was first elected to the House of Commons for the 1692-3 session, and again in 1695–99. During the latter session, he played a leading part in the impeachment of Sir Charles Porter, the flamboyant and controversial Lord Chancellor of Ireland, for what were vaguely described as "high crimes and misdemeanours". The impeachment (which was a purely political attack by his enemies) failed, largely due to Porter's eloquent speech in his own defence, and the high regard felt by King William III for Porter, one of the few of his Ministers for whom he had any personal liking.

Porter, during his speech in his own defence at his impeachment, said that he would forgive his enemies, but he did not forgive Neave. When Lord Capell, the Lord Lieutenant of Ireland, told Porter in late 1695 that he intended to appoint Neave as Second Serjeant, Porter reacted with fury, saying he would not endure it. Capell, whose relations with Porter were never good, replied that the matter was already decided. He argued that Neave was highly regarded by the Law Officers and had been recommended by several influential peers, and that it was vital for the Government to have gifted lawyers to manage its legal business in the Commons. He pointed out sharply that he had allowed Porter to have his own way on several other appointments, including the Prime Serjeant, Sir Thomas Pakenham, and he had made no objection to Porter's own brother William taking silk. As for Porter's personal grievance against Neave, he reminded Porter of his promise to forgive his accusers.

Neave was duly appointed Second Serjeant and became Prime Serjeant in 1708. He was also Counsel for the Barracks, an office frequently given to the Serjeant. A petition to the Commons after his death suggests that he was forced to pay all the expenses of the latter office himself. He played a leading role in the Irish Government until 1711, when the new Tory administration dismissed him on strictly political grounds. By Act of Parliament of 1706 he was constituted one of the trustees for dealing with forfeited rebels' estates, to be used for the purposes of building churches and augmenting the livings of poor vicars. He was re-elected to Parliament in 1703 and served as an MP for the remainder of his life.

He died in early December 1713. He was heavily in debt at the time of his death, largely because of the expenses incurred in his professional capacity. In 1717 his executors presented a petition to the Commons praying for his expenses to be reimbursed to the estate.

== Sources ==
- Hart, A.R. A History of the King's Serjeants-at-law at law in Ireland Four Courts Press Dublin 2000
- House of Commons Journal 1717
- Johnston-Liik, E.M. MPs in Dublin-Companion to History of the Irish Parliament 1962-1800 Ulster Historical Foundation 2006
- Kenny, Colum King's Inns and the Kingdom of Ireland: Irish Inn of Court 1541-1800 Irish Academic Press Dublin 1992
- Smyth, Constantine Joseph Chronicle of the Law Officers of Ireland London 1839
- Statute of the Irish Parliament 5 Anne c.25
