= John Bathe (died 1586) =

Irish lawyer and statesman

John Bathe (1536-1586) was an Irish lawyer and statesman of the sixteenth century. He held several important offices, including that of Attorney General for Ireland and Chancellor of the Exchequer of Ireland. He was a member of a prominent landowning family from County Dublin, and himself added to the family estates. His children included the Jesuit William Bathe, who was a noted musicologist.

== Biography ==
He was the only son of James Bathe, Chief Baron of the Irish Exchequer (died 1570) and his second wife Elizabeth, daughter of John Burnell of Balgriffin, and widow of Robert Barnewall of Drimnagh. Despite some suspicions about his loyalty during the Rebellion of Silken Thomas, the elder Bathe became a trusted servant of the English Crown who held high judicial office for 30 years. Like his son, he adhered publicly to the Church of Ireland but was generally believed to be a Roman Catholic at heart.

The Bathes were a junior branch of a long-established County Meath family (other branches of which were settled at Kingstown and Athcarne Castle). They are recorded at Rathfeigh since the 1360s. James became a major landowner in Dublin; he held Drimnagh Castle by right of his father's marriage to the previous owner's widow, and began the building of Drumcondra Castle, which his son completed. Drumcondra House, which is now part of All Hallows College, is located on the site of the old Castle, and a tablet survives there referring to John Bathe and his first wife Eleanor Preston as the builders of the Castle. An earlier John Bathe, who held office as Chief Justice of the Irish Common Pleas 1554-9, was a cousin. Richard Burnell, a successful English barrister and MP for London, was a family connection through John's mother, and referred to John Bathe as "my brother". Richard left John his law books at his death in 1558, "on condition that he continues his legal studies".

== Career ==
John was studying law at Lincoln's Inn in 1560, with the help of the legacy from his cousin Richard Burnell, and was called to the Bar there. He returned to Ireland to take up his profession. He had some difficulty at first in building up a successful legal practice, but from the late 1560s onward his career advanced rapidly: he became Principal Solicitor for Ireland in 1570 and Attorney-General for Ireland in 1574. The office of Principal Solicitor then lapsed. In 1576 he was appointed to a powerful royal commission to inquire into "concealed lands" in several counties, formerly held by monasteries and attainted persons.

His career suffered a check when the Lord Deputy of Ireland, Sir Henry Sidney, adopted a policy of appointing only Protestant judges and law officers: Bathe, who was well known to incline privately to Catholicism, was removed from office in 1577. This was only a temporary setback and the following year he was appointed Chancellor of the Exchequer, an office which he held until his death.

Apart perhaps from Sir Henry Sidney, all the English-born officials in Ireland who worked with him seem to have admired and respected Bathe, particularly Sir John Perrot, with whom he enjoyed a close friendship, and whose harsh treatment of the Old Irish he is said to have alleviated. His personal kindness is shown by his will, in particular by a bequest to build a hospital for poor men at Balgriffin.

In contrast to his father, who had been under something of a cloud in the 1530s at the time of the Silken Thomas rebellion, John was never suspected of any inclination to rebellion. Although the rebel William Nugent was a close relative by marriage, Bathe, unlike some of his family, took no part in his uprising. He adhered publicly to the Church of Ireland, but his private loyalty to the Roman Catholic faith was no secret: his second wife Jenet was an open Catholic, and his children, two of whom became Catholic priests, were clearly raised in that faith. Jenet's zeal for the Catholic faith was a matter of some concern to the Crown, and she was kept under discreet surveillance for many years.

== Property ==
He was renowned for his remarkable skill in adding to the family estates: he successfully claimed in right of his mother, Elizabeth Burnell, the former lands of the Burnell family at Balgriffin and Chapelizod. He also acquired land at Clonturk, Ballybough and Glasnevin, and further afield in Meath and Kildare. It has been argued in his defence that Bathe was not motivated by personal greed, but by the wish to provide generously for his large family.

== Family ==
He married firstly Eleanor Preston, daughter of Jenico Preston, 3rd Viscount Gormanston and his wife Lady Catherine FitzGerald, daughter of Gerald FitzGerald, 9th Earl of Kildare and had, as well as a daughter, two sons:

- William (1564-1614), who inherited his father's large estates, and became a Jesuit and later a noted linguist and writer on music;
- Sir John Bathe (1565-1634) to whom William transferred the family estates, was for many years a leading spokesman for the Irish Catholic landowning class.

Their father married secondly Jenet Finglas, daughter of Patrick Finglas of Westphailstown, County Dublin. They had five children, of whom the most notable was:

- Luke, who like his brother William entered the priesthood, took the name in religion Father Edward, and was for many years head of the Capuchin mission to Ireland.

Bathe's widow remarried Sir William Warren, a noted soldier and close ally of Hugh O'Neill, Earl of Tyrone, by whom she had several daughters, and after Warren's death, she married thirdly Terence O'Dempsey, 1st Viscount Clanmalier, but had no further issue.

Jenet and Warren are generally believed to have arranged Hugh O'Neill's much-discussed third marriage to Mabel Bagenal, which took place at Drumcondra Castle in 1591. Jenet died in 1627; her third husband outlived her by some years, and died in about 1638.

Legal offices
Preceded by Edward Fitz-Symon	Attorney-General for Ireland; 1574-1577	Succeeded by Thomas Snagge
