= Serjeant-at-law (Ireland) =

Rank at the Irish Bar

This is a list of lawyers who held the rank of serjeant-at-law at the Bar of Ireland.

== Origins of the office of serjeant ==
The first recorded serjeant was Roger Owen, who was appointed between 1261 and 1266, although the title itself was not used in Ireland until about 1388. The earlier terms were "serviens", "King's Narrator" "King's Pleader" or "Serjeant Pleader". The term King's Pleader was still in use in the 1470s. There is a reference to Richard le Blond as the King's "Serjeant Pleader" in 1305 or 1306. In the early years of the office, appointment as serjeant might be temporary and might cover only a part of the country, although John de Neville was acting as Serjeant in 1295-6 "for all parts of Ireland". Roger l'Enfant in the late 1370s pleaded mainly in Cork City, and Walter Cotterell in Munster As a rule, the Serjeant was licensed to appear in all of the Royal Courts, although John Haire in 1392 was described as "Serjeant-at-law of our Lord the King in the Common Pleas".

== The role of the Serjeant-at-law ==
The serjeant's duties were numerous and varied. Early serjeants spent much time suing to recover Royal lands which had been unlawfully disposed of, and recovering other Crown property like weirs and fisheries. They also spent a surprisingly large amount of time protecting the Crown's right of advowson: i.e. the right of nomination of a parish priest to a particular church (many private landowners also acquired the right).

In 1537 a Royal Commission on law reform considered recommending the abolition of the office of Serjeant, and the transfer of his functions to the Attorney General, but nothing came of the proposal, probably due to firm opposition from the Serjeant-at-law of the day, Patrick Barnewall, who argued that the Serjeant-at-law had argued in Court on the Crown's behalf for 200 years, and that the existing system worked perfectly well.

In 1597 the Serjeant was called "a principal officer by ancient custom", although the meaning of "principal officer" is unclear.

In contrast to England, for many years there was only one serjeant-at-law in Ireland, who was known as the "king's serjeant" or simply "serjeant". In 1627 another officeholder was appointed, and the two were known as the "prime serjeant" and "second serjeant". In 1682 a "third serjeant" was appointed. In 1805 the prime serjeant became known as "first serjeant."

Until the nineteenth century, the need for three serjeants was often questioned, especially as the office of Third Serjeant was often left vacant for several years. The position of third serjeant was created simply as a form of "consolation prize" for Sir John Lyndon, the first holder of the office, who had been passed over as both a High Court judge and as second serjeant, and that no particular duties attached to the office. Certainly, Sir Richard Ryves, the Recorder of Dublin, was able to combine the notoriously gruelling office of recorder with the position of third serjeant, and later second serjeant. This suggests that he was not overworked in his role as serjeant, despite the chronic ill-health which eventually incapacitated him. Alan Brodrick, 1st Viscount Midleton, who was removed from his office of third serjeant in 1692, complained that his dismissal was unwarranted, but admitted that in his two years in the office, he had almost no work to do. Hewitt Poole Jellett, second serjeant in the early 1900s, was so old that his office was clearly an honorary one.

== Emoluments ==
The position was extremely lucrative, at least until the late eighteenth century. Although in theory the salary in the 1690s was fixed at £30 a year (it had been £20 in 1620), it was well known that in practice the various perquisites attached to the office brought it up to between £900 and £1000 a year, in addition to what the office holder earned from private fees, as it was the serjeant's right to continue to take briefs on behalf of clients other than the Crown. In the early centuries, it was apparently normal procedure for the Serjeants to take private work, although it was understood that Crown work took precedence: a retainer agreement made between William of Bardfield, King's Serjeant, and his client Nicholas, son of John of Interberge, in the early 1300s spells this out. In the early centuries the Serjeant might be paid for his Crown work in a single session of the Court, as for example, Roger L' Enfant was in 1377.

By the late nineteenth century, according to Maurice Healy, the rule had grown up that the Serjeants could not take cases against the Crown, and by then they had ceased to receive a salary; the assurance of a steady supply of Crown work was felt to be a sufficient reward.

== Politics and precedence ==
From the fourteenth century on, the serjeant usually had a seat in the Irish House of Commons. As a government officeholder, he was expected to manage parliamentary business in the Commons on the government's behalf. Because he was a government appointment he was liable to summary dismissal on a change of government, as happened most notably in 1714, on the accession of the House of Hanover. In the early centuries he was invariably a member of the Privy Council of Ireland; later the attorney general took his place (as early as 1441 Stephen Roche, the king's attorney, is recorded as a member of the Council). In 1441 it was noted that the Serjeant-at-law must attend at his own expense all meetings of Council and Parliament "wherever they are held in Ireland".

The serjeants-at-law ranked ahead of the Attorney-General for Ireland and the Solicitor-General for Ireland (on several occasions one man held both the offices of Serjeant and Solicitor General) until 1805, when the law officers took precedence, the office of prime serjeant being downgraded to first serjeant, with precedence over the other two serjeants but not the law officers. From about 1660 onwards they were expected to consult with the Attorney General and were discouraged from acting on their own initiative: in 1692 the prime serjeant, John Osborne, was dismissed for repeatedly acting in opposition to Crown policy. From the 1560s on the serjeants acted as "messengers" to the Irish House of Commons i.e. they were summoned to advise the House on points of law, just as the High Court judges advised the Irish House of Lords. The role of messenger lapsed around 1740.

Many sixteenth-century serjeants, including Thomas Rochfort, Thomas Luttrell, Patrick Barnewall and John Bathe, were solicitors-general at the same time, suggesting that the latter office was the most junior of the Law Officers and that the duties were not very onerous. At least one serjeant of the era, Richard Finglas, combined the office of serjeant with the subordinate office of Principal Solicitor for Ireland.

In the seventeenth and eighteenth centuries, the serjeants often acted as extra judges of assize, or in another minor judicial capacity. Although the practice had its critics, it survived intermittently into the nineteenth century: Walter Berwick was chairman of the East Cork Quarter Sessions from 1856 to 1859, while also serving as serjeant, and Sir John Howley was both serjeant-at-law and chairman of the County Tipperary Quarter Sessions for 30 years. Howley however was criticised for what was called his "legal pluralism". At least one serjeant, Sir John Bere (1609–17), went as a judge of assize while sitting as an MP in the Parliament of 1613-15, which would be considered grossly improper nowadays, although Irish judges then were often encouraged by the Crown to sit in the Commons.

Many, but not all, serjeants went on to become judges of one of the courts of common law. The career of Hewitt Poole Jellett followed a somewhat unusual path in that he was appointed serjeant after retiring from office as chairman of the Quarter Sessions for Queen's County (now County Laois) and returning to practice at the Bar. Even more surprisingly, he remained a serjeant for life and was still in office when he was eighty-five. Joseph Stock was a judge of the Irish Admiralty Court both before and during his long tenure as serjeant (1840–51), although he was clearly only a part-time judge.

== Abolition of the office of serjeant ==
No serjeants were appointed after 1919, and on the establishment of the Irish Free State, the rank ceased to exist. The last surviving serjeant, Alexander Sullivan, moved to England where he practised at the English Bar, and as a mark of courtesy was always addressed as Serjeant Sullivan.

== King's serjeants, 1261–1627 ==
- 1261: Roger Owen
- 1270: Robert of St. Edmund
- 1281: John Fitzwilliam
- 1292: John de Ponz (also called John de Ponte or John of Bridgwater)
- 1293: John de Neville
- 1297: William of Bardfield
- 1297: Richard le Blond
- 1310: Matthew of Harwood
- 1316 Nicholas de Snyterby
- 1319: John of Staines
- 12 February 1326: Simon Fitz-Richard
- 29 September 1327 John of Cardiff, also called John de la Battalk
- 29 September 1327 John Gernoun
- 1331 Thomas de Dent
- 3 December 1341: Hugh Brown
- 1 June 1343: William le Petit
- 1348: Robert Preston, later 1st Baron Gormanston
- 1356: John Keppock
- 1358: Richard White
- 19 November 1363: Edmund de Bereford, or Edmund of Barford
- 1373/4: John Tirel, or Tyrell
- 18 April 1375: Richard Plunkett
- 1375: Walter Cotterell
- Before June 1377: Roger L' Enfant. He was described as "continuously acting as King's Pleader at the Cork sessions" that year, and received a special fee of 20 shillings as his reward.
- 1383: Peter Rowe
- 1386: Richard Glynon
- 24 September 1388: John Bermyngham
- 1392: John Haire, described as "Serjeant of our Lord the King in the Common Pleas"
- 1393: Nicholas White
- 1406: James Uriell
- 10 December 1420: Maurice Stafford
- 20 October 1422: Christopher Bernevall
- 8 November 1434: Sir Thomas Fitz-Christopher Plunket
- 20 June 1435: Robert Dowdall
- 4 February 1437: Edward Somerton
- 24 June 1447 : Thomas Snetterby
- 1460: Peter Trevers
- 1462: Thomas Dowdall
- 1463: Philip Bermingham
- 1471: Henry Duffe
- 1477: John Estrete
- 1496: Thomas Kent
- 1501: John Egyr
- 1504: John Barnewall, 3rd Baron Trimlestown
- 1506: Clement Fitzleones
- 1509: Patrick Finglas
- 1511: Thomas Rochfort
- 1516: Thomas Fitzsimons
- 1520: Robert Barnewall (King's Serjeant)
- 1532: Sir Thomas Luttrell
- 1534: Patrick Barnewall
- 1550: Sir John Bathe
- 11 September 1554: Richard Finglas
- 21 February 1574: Edward Fitz-Symon
- 9 May 1594: Arthur Corye
- 1 November 1597: Sir Edward Loftus
- 8 June 1601: Nicholas Kerdiffe
- 9 February 1609: Sir John Bere
- 13 May 1617: Sir John Brereton

== Prime serjeants, 1627–1805 ==
- 23 May 1627: Sir John Brereton
- 6 October 1629: James Barry
- August 1634: Sir Maurice Eustace
- 20 September 1660: Sir Audley Mervyn
- 26 October 1675: Sir William Davys
- by 1680: John Osborne (succeeded under a patent of reversion dated 29 August 1676; removed from office in 1686)
- 15 February 1687: Garrett Dillon
- 29 September 1690: John Osborne (restored to office in 1690, removed a second time in 1692)
- 29 December 1692: Nehemiah Donnellan
- 5 November 1695: Sir Thomas Pakenham
- 1 December 1703: Robert Saunders
- 28 February 1708: William Neave
- 8 December 1714: William Caulfeild
- 11 August 1711: Robert Blennerhassett
- 9 February 1712: Morley Saunders
- 13 June 1715: Godfrey Boate
- 23 June 1716: Robert Fitzgerald
- 26 January 1724: Francis Bernard
- 22 June 1726: Henry Singleton
- 14 January 1742: Arthur Blennerhassett
- 9 May 1743: Anthony Malone
- 24 January 1754: Eaton Stannard
- 6 October 1757: William Scott
- 27 July 1759: Thomas Tennison
- 11 December 1761: John Hely-Hutchinson
- 18 July 1774: James Dennis
- 24 July 1777: Walter Hussey Burgh
- 14 June 1780: James Browne
- 1 June 1782: Walter Hussey Burgh (again)
- 13 July 1782: Thomas Kelly
- 31 December 1783: John Scott
- 21 May 1784: James Browne (again)
- 21 June 1787: James Fitzgerald
- 28 January 1799: St George Daly
- 1 July 1801: Edmond Stanley
- 29 December 1802: Arthur Browne

== First serjeants, 1805– ==
- 25 July 1805: Arthur Moore
- 25 July 1816: William Johnson
- 28 October 1817: Henry Joy
- 13 May 1822: Thomas Lefroy
- April 1830: Thomas Goold
- February 1832: Edward Pennefather
- 23 May 1835: Richard Wilson Greene
- November 1842: Joseph Stock
- June 1851: Sir John Howley
- 27 February 1866: Richard Armstrong
- 25 October 1880: David Sherlock
- 20 May 1884: James Robinson
- 19 July 1885: Charles Hare Hemphill
- 17 November 1892: William Bennet Campion
- 5 December 1907: Charles Andrew O'Connor
- 14 January 1910: John Francis Moriarty
- 5 July 1913: Charles Louis Matheson
- 29 October 1919: Alexander Martin Sullivan – the last Irish serjeant

== Second serjeants, 1627– ==
- 23 May 1627: Sir Nathaniel Catelyn
- 14 April 1637: Sir William Sambach
- 4 March 1661: Robert Griffith
- 6 April 1670: Henry Hene
- 10 May 1673: Sir Richard Reynell, 1st Baronet
- 26 May 1674: John Osborne
- 7 April 1680: Sir Richard Stephens (dismissed 1682)
- 24 October 1682: William Beckett
- 7 August 1683: Sir Richard Ryves (removed from office 1687)
- May 1687: Sir Henry Echlin
- 14 November 1690: Sir Richard Stephens (restored)
- 5 January 1691: Sir Richard Ryves (restored)
- 8 February 1692: Sir Thomas Pakenham
- 13 January 1696: William Neave
- 1 December 1708: William Caulfeild (resigned)
- 14 August 1711: Morley Saunders
- 12 February 1712: John Cliffe
- 18 December 1714: Robert Fitzgerald
- 23 August 1716: John Witherington
- 23 December 1718: William Brodrick (politician), brother of Viscount Midleton who was Third Serjeant 1691-1711, (Plantation owner in Montserrat, West Indies), Attorney General of Jamaica 1692-1715
- 5 January 1728: Robert Dixon
- 29 April 1731: Richard Bettesworth
- 31 March 1741: Robert Marshall
- 25 November 1757: Richard Malone
- 10 September 1759: Edmond Malone (brother of the preceding)
- 14 January 1767: James Dennis
- 19 July 1774: Maurice Coppinger
- 5 November 1777: Hugh Carleton
- 8 May 1779: Attiwell Wood
- 8 April 1784: James Fitzgerald
- 27 June 1787: John Toler
- 17 August 1789: Joseph Hewitt
- 30 July 1791: Henry Duquerry
- 10 December 1793: Sir James Chatterton, 1st Baronet
- 23 April 1806: John Ball
- 3 December 1813: William MacMahon
- 4 March 1814: William Johnson
- 26 July 1816: Henry Joy
- 29 October 1817: Richard Jebb
- 1 December 1818: Charles Burton
- 3 December 1820: Thomas Lefroy
- 13 May 1822: John Lloyd
- 19 April 1830: Francis Blackburne
- 18 January 1831: Edward Pennefather
- 13 February 1832: Michael O'Loghlen
- 27 January 1835: Joseph Devonsher Jackson
- November 1841: Joseph Stock
- November 1842: Richard Benson Warren
- July 1848: Sir John Howley
- June 1851: James O'Brien
- 5 February 1858: Walter Berwick
- 1859: Gerald Fitzgibbon
- 25 February 1860: James Anthony Lawson
- 21 February 1861: Edward Sullivan
- 18 February 1865: Richard Armstrong
- 24 February 1866: Sir Colman O'Loghlen, Bt
- 29 November 1877: David Sherlock
- 25 October 1880: James Robinson
- 20 May 1884: Charles Hare Hemphill
- 19 July 1885: Peter O'Brien
- 14 July 1887: William Bennett Campion
- 17 November 1892: Hewitt Poole Jellett
- 18 July 1911: Ignatius O'Brien, 1st Baron Shandon
- 9 December 1911: Thomas Molony
- 20 July 1912: Charles Louis Matheson
- 5 July 1913: Alexander Martin Sullivan
- 29 October 1919: George McSweeney

== Third serjeants, 1682– ==
- 24 July 1682: Sir John Lyndon
- 19 February 1683: Sir Richard Ryves
- 3 August 1683: Sir Henry Echlin
- 6 May 1687: Sir John Barnewall
- March 1688: Sir Theobald Butler
- 5 January 1691: Alan Brodrick, 1st Viscount Midleton
- 29 November 1711: John Cliffe
- 25 February 1712: John Staunton
- 14 December 1714: John Witherington
- 28 March 1726: Robert Jocelyn
- 4 May 1727: John Bowes
- October 1730: Henry Purdon
- 18 April 1737: Robert Marshall
- 21 January 1742: Philip Tisdall
- 28 October 1751: Richard Malone
- 24 November 1757: Marcus Paterson
- 10 October 1764: James Dennis
- 15 January 1767: Godfrey Lill
- 12 July 1770: Maurice Coppinger
- 20 July 1774: George Hamilton
- 15 May 1776: Hugh Carleton
- 6 November 1777: Attiwell Wood
- 8 May 1779: James Fitzgerald
- 25 July 1782: Peter Metge
- 15 January 1784: John Toler
- 27 June 1787: Joseph Hewitt
- 17 August 1789: Henry Duquerry
- 30 July 1791: James Chatterton
- 10 December 1793: Edmond Stanley
- 30 October 1801: Arthur Moore
- 25 July 1805: Charles Kendal Bushe
- 25 October 1805: John Ball
- 23 April 1806: William MacMahon
- 4 December 1813: William Johnson
- 19 March 1814: Henry Joy
- 27 July 1816: Richard Jebb
- 30 October 1817: Charles Burton
- 1 December 1818: Thomas Lefroy
- 13 February 1821: Thomas Burton Vandeleur
- 13 May 1822: Robert Torrens
- 13 July 1823: Thomas Goold
- April 1830: Edward Pennefather
- 18 January 1831: Michael O'Loghlen
- 7 February 1832: Louis Perrin
- 23 May 1835: Stephen Woulfe
- 10 November 1836: Nicholas Ball
- 20 July 1838: William Curry
- May 1840: Richard Moore
- August 1840: Joseph Stock
- November 1841: Richard Benson Warren
- November 1842: Richard Keating
- September 1843: Sir John Howley
- July 1848: James O'Brien
- June 1851: Jonathan Christian
- 1855: Walter Berwick
- 5 February 1858: Rickard Deasy
- 1859: Gerald Fitzgibbon
- 1859: Thomas O'Hagan
- 24 October 1860: Edward Sullivan
- 21 February 1861: Richard Armstrong
- 18 February 1865: Sir Colman O'Loghlen, Bt
- 24 February 1866: Charles Robert Barry
- 12 January 1867: Richard Dowse
- 11 March 1870: David Sherlock
- 29 November 1877: James Robinson
- 25 October 1880: Denis Caulfield Heron
- 30 May 1881: John O'Hagan
- 13 September 1881: Charles Hare Hemphill
- 26 May 1884: Peter O'Brien
- 18 July 1885: John George Gibson
- 5 December 1885: William Bennett Campion
- 14 July 1887: Dodgson Hamilton Madden
- 14 February 1888: Hewitt Poole Jellett
- 17 November 1892: William Huston Dodd
- 23 March 1907: Charles Andrew O'Connor
- 5 December 1907: Matthew Bourke
- 5 June 1909 : John Francis Moriarty
- 14 January 1910: Ignatius O'Brien, 1st Baron Shandon
- 18 May 1911 : Thomas Molony
- 8 December 1911: Charles Louis Matheson
- 20 July 1912: Alexander Martin Sullivan
- 5 July 1913: George McSweeney
- 29 October 1919: Henry Hanna
