= Henry Duffe =

Irish judge, 15th century

Henry Duffe or Duff (died after 1488) was an Irish judge of the late fifteenth century.

He was born in Drogheda to an old Anglo-Irish family which had settled in Ireland soon after the Norman Conquest; later he and his wife Katherine jointly acquired lands at Staunton in County Meath. Francis and George Duffe of Drogheda, living in 1550, may have been descendants of Henry.

He was called to the Bar and became King's Serjeant in December 1471. The appointment, unusually for that time, was stated to be for life, but he apparently held it only until December 1476. A statute of that year fixed his salary at 100 shillings a year, charged on the Crown debts due from County Louth. In the same year he became Controller of the Ports of Dublin and Drogheda. He was Chief Baron of the Irish Exchequer in 1478–80 and was then transferred to the Court of Common Pleas (Ireland) as second justice. His salary was 40 marks a year, secured on the fee-farm rents of Drogheda. The language of the letters patent transferring Duff to the more junior office does not suggest that it was intended as a demotion.

Like all his Irish judicial colleagues he backed the unsuccessful attempt by the pretender Lambert Simnel to seize the English throne in 1487, an attempt which was crushed decisively at the Battle of Stoke Field. He took part in a public ceremony of repentance the following year and, like all his colleagues, he received a royal pardon from the victorious King Henry VII. His date of death is not recorded.
