= John Cusacke =

Mayor of Dublin, Ireland

John Cusacke (died 1626) was a wealthy merchant, landowner and local politician in seventeenth-century Dublin, who served as both Mayor and Sheriff of Dublin city.

He was born in County Meath, eldest of the ten children of Patrick Cusacke of Ballymolghan and his wife Maud Plunkett, daughter of Thomas Plunkett of Loch Gabhair (Lagore), Ratoath. The Cusacks were recorded at Ballymolghan from 1508.

He was admitted as a freeman of the city of Dublin in 1592, having served his apprenticeship. He married Margaret Allen, daughter of Giles Allen, a former Mayor of Dublin, and widow of John Gough, an alderman. They had five children, including Robert, who inherited his father's estate and sat in the Irish House of Commons as MP for Kells from 1640 to 1642, and Anne, who married Richard Barry.

John served as Sheriff of Dublin City from 1599 to 1600 and was an alderman of Dublin Corporation from 1604 until his death. He was active on several committees of the corporation, notably one to lobby for the corporation's interests in the forthcoming Parliament of 1613 to 1615, and served as the Corporation's Treasurer from 1610 to 1611. He was Mayor of Dublin from 1608 to 1609: Robert Kennedy, who had hoped to be mayor, was passed over, apparently because he was a recusant. John himself, though he conformed outwardly to the Protestant faith, was deeply sympathetic to Roman Catholics, and was an active member of Saint Anne's Guild, the leading Catholic guild in Dublin, helping to defend its charter when it was under threat. He served four terms as one of the masters of the Dublin Merchants' Guild, and on its behalf, he petitioned the English Crown in 1609 for repayment of loans owing to the Irish Exchequer: he claimed that £1300 was owed to him personally, an indication of his wealth.

He became a substantial landowner in Dublin and Meath. The principal Cusacke family home was Rathgar Castle (which had been built by the Segrave family in the sixteenth century). It stood in Rathgar, which is now a suburb of Dublin: he bought the castle in 1609. All trace of it has vanished today, but it probably stood on present-day Highfield Road.

He was the grandfather of two distinguished judges: Robert, his eldest son, was the father of Adam Cusack, justice of the Court of Common Pleas (Ireland), and his daughter Anne was the mother of James Barry, 1st Baron Barry of Santry, Lord Chief Justice of Ireland.

== Sources ==
- Armstrong, Robert "John Cusack" Dictionary of Irish Biography Cambridge University Press
- Ball, F. Elrington The Judges in Ireland 1221-1921 John Murray London 1926
- Close Roll 23 Henry VII 4 May 1508

Civic offices
Preceded by Nicholas Barran	Mayor of Dublin; 1608–1609	Succeeded by Robert Ball
