= Hewitt Poole Jellett =

Irish barrister and judge

Hewitt Poole Jellett (5 January 1825- 19 March 1911) was an Irish barrister and judge. He is notable for holding the office of Serjeant-at-law (Ireland) for more than twenty years until his death at the age of eighty-six.

He was born in Tullycorbet, County Monaghan, a younger son of the Reverend Morgan Jellett (died 1832), rector of the parish, and Harriette Townsend Poole, daughter of Hewitt Baldwin Poole of Mayfield, County Cork and Dorothea Morris. John Hewitt Jellett, Provost of Trinity College Dublin, was his elder brother.

He went to school in Edgeworthstown, County Longford, and entered Trinity College, Dublin in 1840, when he was still only 15, graduating BA in 1846. He was called to the Bar in 1847 and took silk in 1864. He served as Chairman of the Quarter Sessions for Queen's County (now County Laois) from 1865 to 1877, then returned to private practice at the Bar. He became a Bencher of the King's Inns in 1875: his portrait still hangs in the Inns.

In 1888 he was appointed Third Serjeant, and he became Second Serjeant in 1892. Unusually, he remained Second Serjeant until his death at the age of eighty-six, although he seems to have ceased practising law about 1899. Hart suggests that in his later years he was regarded simply as an "honorary" serjeant: when the office of First Serjeant fell vacant in 1907 there was no question of promoting Jellett, who was then eighty-two.

He died of pneumonia in March 1911 at his home in Upper Pembroke Street, Dublin. Although he had long since retired from active practice at the Bar, the newspapers wrote that his death was a severe loss to the legal profession

He married Josephine Barrington, daughter of Sir Matthew Barrington, 2nd Baronet, who is best remembered for the foundation of Barrington's Hospital, Limerick, and his wife Charlotte Hartigan, daughter of the eminent surgeon William Hartigan. They had two sons.

Dr William Hartigan, grandfather of Jellett's wife, Josephine Barrington

== Sources ==
- Burke, Sir Bernard "Landed Gentry of Ireland" London Harrisons 1899
- Haydn, John and Ockerby, Horace The Book of Dignities 3rd Edition London 1894
- Hart, A. R. History of the King's Serjeant at law in Ireland Dublin Four Courts Press 2000
- Irish Independent 20 March 1911
