= James Barry, 1st Baron Barry of Santry =

Irish lawyer, judge and peer

James Barry, 1st Baron Barry of Santry PC (Ire) (1603–1673) was an Irish lawyer, judge and peer.

== Early life ==
Barry was the son of Richard Barry and his wife Anne Cusacke; Anne was the daughter of John Cusacke of Rathgar Castle and his wife Margaret Gough (née Allen). His father and both his grandfathers were wealthy merchants of Dublin, his grandfather James Barry having been Sheriff of Dublin City, while his father was Lord Mayor of Dublin (1610–11) and representative in the Irish House of Commons for Dublin (1613–15). His maternal grandfather John Cusacke had also been Mayor from 1608–1609. Nicholas Kerdiffe, a senior Law Officer, married his aunt.

He married Catharine Parsons (daughter of Sir William Parsons and Elizabeth Lany), by whom he had four sons and four daughters, including Richard, his heir, and Dorothy, who married Sir John Feilding, secretary to the Governor of Jamaica. His favourite sister Anne married James Donnellan, later Chief Justice of the Irish Common Pleas, but died young: her brother and her husband remained close throughout their lives. Adam Cusack, Chief Justice of Connacht, was a cousin in the next generation of James on his mother's side.

He graduated from Trinity College, Dublin, Ireland, on 27 April 1621 with a Bachelor of Arts (B.A.). He gained a Master of Arts (M.A.) from Trinity College, Dublin, in June 1624.

== Career ==
He was admitted to Lincoln's Inn on 11 July 1621. In 1628 he served as a barrister, and he was appointed Recorder of Dublin. Other appointments included Prime Sergeant, 6 October 1629. He was admitted to King's Inn, 15 April 1630, (he served twice as its treasurer) and was Member of Parliament for Lismore in 1634.

He became second Baron of the Court of Exchequer (Ireland), 5 August 1634, through the influence of Lord Wentworth. He published in 1637, at the request of Lord Wentworth, to whom he dedicated it, The Case of Tenures upon the Commission of Defective Titles, argued by all the Judges of Ireland, with the Resolution and the Reasons of their Resolution, a crucial test case from the Crown's point of view. In 1640 he used what influence he had, but in vain, with Sir James Ware and other members of the Irish House of Commons, to prevent their sending a committee of their body to England to impeach the Earl of Strafford, as Wentworth now was. History says nothing of his life for the next twenty years. He was chairman of the Royalist Convention, 7 July 1659. This met at Dublin in defiance of the government. It voted for the unconditional Restoration of Charles II. In November 1660, "in consideration of his many good services to Charles I and his eminent loyalty to Charles II", he became Lord Chief Justice of the King's Bench for Ireland, and Privy Counsellor. He was appointed a commissioner to execute the King's Declaration which ultimately led to the Act of Settlement 1662. He was accused, rather obscurely, of being "a cold friend" to the Declaration, and this, as well as his increasing infirmity, was one of the "material objections" which led to his being rejected as Speaker of the Irish House of Lords. However, he did sit on the Lords Committee to consider the state of the Irish coinage.

As Treasurer and Council member of the King's Inns he was accused of being dilatory and inefficient, perhaps as a result of the "infirmity" referred to above.

== Ennoblement ==
He was created 1st Baron Barry of Santry, County Dublin on 18 February 1661. His residence was at Santry. His portrait is the oldest now in the possession of the King's Inns.

== Death ==
He died on 9 February 1673 and was buried on 14 February 1673 in St. Mary's Chapel, Christchurch Cathedral, Dublin. His eldest son Richard succeeded as second Baron Barry. The fourth and last Baron was a notorious murderer: the title became extinct on his death in 1751.

Legal offices
Preceded by William Basill	Lord Chief Justice of the King's Bench for Ireland; 1660–1673	Succeeded by Sir John Povey
Peerage of Ireland
New creation	Baron Barry of Santry; 1661–1673	Succeeded by Richard Barry
