= Richard Finglas =

Irish barrister and Law Officer

Richard Finglas (died 1574) was an Irish barrister and Law Officer of the sixteenth century.

He belonged to the prominent Finglas family of Westphailstown (or Westpalstown), County Dublin. He was a close relative, probably a nephew or grandson, of Patrick Finglas, Lord Chief Justice of Ireland, who died in 1537.

He was appointed Principal Solicitor for Ireland in 1550. As Principal Solicitor, he served as deputy to the Solicitor General for Ireland. He was appointed Serjeant-at-law (Ireland) in 1554. Some sources state that he was appointed Solicitor General in the same year, but this may simply reflect the frequent confusion between the two similarly named offices of Solicitor General and Principal Solicitor. He played a part in the development of the King's Inns as Ireland's first law school, and is listed as one of the lessees of the building which housed the Inns at Blackfriars (modern Henrietta Street) in the 1567 lease from the English Crown. He sat on a number of Crown commissions, including one in 1559 for assessing the inhabitants of Dublin for taxation, and two for mustering the available troops in the Pale. He sat on a commission of gaol delivery in Westmeath and Kildare in 1553-4.

As Queen's Serjeant, he earned high praise from the Irish Government for his devotion to duty: he was awarded a special annuity of £10 for his "labour and diligence" and his regular attendance before the Court of Castle Chamber (the Irish version of Star Chamber) and the Privy Council of Ireland; this seems to have been a special reward over and above the normal fees for his office.

Despite his obvious legal ability, and the high opinion which the Irish Government had of his diligence, he never became a High Court judge: this probably reflected the low opinion which Queen Elizabeth I had of her Irish Law Officers, whom she generally refused to promote to the judiciary, and whom, when they died or retired, she replaced, if possible, with English lawyers. On the other hand, she seems to have had a high opinion of Finglas himself, as shown by her decision to grant him a special allowance.

He died, still in office, in 1574.

== Sources ==
- Hart, A. R. History of the King's Serjeant at law in Ireland Four Courts Press Dublin 2000
- Kenny, Colum King's Inns and the Kingdom of Ireland Irish Academic Press Dublin 1992
- Morrin, James Calendar of the Patent and Close Rolls of Chancery in Ireland in the reigns of Henry VIII, Edward VI, Mary and Elizabeth Alexander Thom and Co. Dublin 1861
- Smyth, Constantine Joseph Chronicle of the Law Officers of Ireland Butterworths London 1839
