= A. M. Sullivan (barrister) =

Irish lawyer (1871–1959)

Alexander Martin Sullivan, SL (14 January 1871 – 9 January 1959) was an Irish lawyer, best known as the leading counsel for the defence in the 1916 treason trial of Roger Casement. He was the last barrister in either Ireland or England to hold the rank of serjeant-at-law, hence his nickname The Last Serjeant.

== Early life ==
A younger son of Alexander Martin Sullivan and Frances Donovan, he was born in Dublin and educated at Beaumont College, Ushaw College, Belvedere College, Trinity College Dublin and King's Inns. Sullivan was called to the Irish Bar in 1892 and practised on the Munster Circuit.

== Barrister ==
He was appointed an Irish KC in 1908 and King's Third Serjeant-at-law (Ireland) in 1912 advancing to Second Serjeant in 1913 and First Serjeant in 1919 – the last holder of that position.

A moderate constitutional nationalist and supporter of the Irish Parliamentary Party, Sullivan was a prominent campaigner for the recruitment of Irishmen into the British army during the First World War. His opposition to Sinn Féin republicanism and his prominent role in conducting prosecutions on behalf of the Crown during the Irish War of Independence led to an attempt on his life in 1920. In April 1921 Derry House, Rosscarbery in County Cork, which Sullivan had purchased two years previously was burned by the IRA.

As a result, Sullivan relocated to England in 1921 and established a career at the English Bar, having previously been called to the Middle Temple in 1899. He subsequently became a Bencher and Treasurer of Middle Temple. By courtesy, he was always referred to as Serjeant Sullivan, even though that rank no longer existed in England.

He remained a member of the Irish Bar, and returned to Dublin at least once in 1923 to appear in the celebrated case of Croker v Croker, where the children of the former leader of Tammany Hall, "Boss" Croker attempted to overturn his will, which left his entire estate to their stepmother. Sullivan appeared for Richard Croker junior. Despite his best efforts, the attempt to invalidate the will on the grounds of undue influence was unsuccessful.

He was noted as a fearless advocate, who brought to his English practice the robust manners he had learned in the Irish county courts. He did not hesitate to interrupt the judge, and if he felt that he was not receiving a fair hearing, he was quite capable of walking out of Court.

== Casement trial ==
In 1916 Sullivan was retained as lead counsel in the trial of Sir Roger Casement for treason. No English barrister would defend Casement, and Sullivan was persuaded to take the case by George Gavan Duffy, whose wife Margaret was Sullivan's sister. Despite his rank of Serjeant at law and King's Counsel at the Irish bar, Sullivan was at that time only ranked as a junior barrister in England. As the facts relied on by the prosecution were largely undisputed, Sullivan limited himself to arguing a technical defence that the Treason Act 1351 only applied to acts committed "within the realm" and not outside it; this, in spite of Casement's exhortations to consider "the wider issues" in his arguments, and the opportunity of citing (chief prosecutor's) F. E. Smith's own declaration of treason in the preceding years alongside fellow Ulster Protestant leader Edward Carson. The Act's terms had however been expanded by case law over the previous 560 years, and the defence was rejected by the trial judges and by the Court of Criminal Appeal. Casement commented "God deliver from such antiquaries as these, to hang a man’s life upon a comma and throttle him with a semi-colon."

== Memoirs ==
Sullivan wrote two books: Old Ireland in 1927 and The Last Serjeant in 1952. He retired from legal practice in 1949, and returned to Ireland to spend his last years there. He lived on Greenmount Road in Terenure, Dublin. He married in 1900 Helen Kelley, daughter of Major John Kelley of Brooklyn, New York, and had issue.
