= Henry Duquerry =

Irish barrister, Law Officer and politician

Henry Duquerry (c.1750-1804) was a leading Irish barrister, Law Officer and politician of the late eighteenth and early nineteenth centuries. He was a member of the Irish House of Commons and held the office of Serjeant-at-law (Ireland). He was renowned as an advocate and as an orator, but was considered to be only a mediocre politician. His career was cut short in his forties by a debilitating mental illness (which was referred to at the time as "sunstroke"). The condition eventually destroyed his intellectual faculties.

== Family and early life ==
He was born in Dublin, son of Henry Duquerry senior. It is unclear whether they were related to the Duqueroy family of Cork: a Henry Duqueroy was made a Freeman of Cork in 1777. The Duquerry family of Dublin are thought to have been French Huguenots who settled in Ireland after the revocation of the Edict of Nantes. The elder Duquerry apparently held an official position, as he was granted a Crown pension of £200 a year, "to be charged on the French funds", in 1762.

The younger Henry was educated at the Reverend Thomas Ball's school in Dublin and at Trinity College Dublin, becoming a Scholar of the college in 1769, and then proceeding to the degree of Bachelor of Arts. He was one of the founders of the College Historical Society in 1770.

In 1774 he was living at Kildare Street, Dublin, with his wife and two young children. He was then holding the office of Surveyor of The Custom House, Dublin, which was probably a sinecure.The Hibernian Magazine of that year has a detailed description of an alarming incident where Duquerry was robbed at gunpoint by a footpad who threatened his infant son's life. The robber was later arrested.

== Career ==
In the same year Duquerry was called to the Bar, having already entered the Middle Temple in 1769. In 1779 he became King's Counsel and a Bencher of the King's Inn. He was renowned for his forensic skill as a barrister, and for his eloquence, which was enhanced by his beautiful speaking voice. He became Third Serjeant-at-law in 1789 and Second Serjeant in 1791.

He entered politics, sitting in the House of Commons as MP for Armagh Borough 1789-90 and for Rathcormack 1790–97. He has been described as a failure as a politician, despite being a fine orator. Although his speech in 1795 on the possibility of a peace treaty with France caused something of a stir, and was later published as a pamphlet, one listener called it "the stupidest thing I ever heard".

If he was not an outstanding politician, he was nonetheless highly valued as a social companion for his charm and wit. He was a friend of most of the leading politicians of the day, including Henry Grattan and John Philpot Curran, the latter being his fellow MP for Rathcormack. He was a member of the popular drinking club, the Monks of the Screw, which Curran founded in 1779.

== Mental illness and decline ==
Duquerry's flourishing career was destroyed by the onset of a serious mental illness in 1793. He had recently visited the Holy Land, and intended to publish an account of his travels there: but on the return journey he suffered what his contemporaries called "sunstroke". Whatever the precise medical nature of his illness, it is said to have ultimately deprived him of his intellect; Oliver Burke, some generations later, wrote that in his last years he "groped in utter idiocy", a statement confirmed by the biographer William Fitzpatrick in the 1860s.

The illness was obviously grave, as he was forced to resign his office as Serjeant-at-law: but Hart suggests that he must have recovered his reason, at least for a time, since he continued to practice at the Bar and attend the House of Commons.

In 1793, the year he first suffered his mental affliction, he voted against the Convention Act, which effectively put an end to the Irish Volunteers, in which he was a colonel. He also voted in favour of the Catholic Relief Act, the Irish equivalent of the UK Catholic Relief Act 1791, while arguing that the concessions granted to members of the Roman Catholic faith (the new rights included possession of the franchise, the right to join the legal profession, and the right of Catholic students to seek admission to the University of Dublin) should have been more generous. His "nations were born to assist nations" speech on the subject of tariffs in the Commons in February 1794 is considered one of his best, and suggests that he was then perfectly lucid.

He was spoken of as a possible defence counsel for the United Irishman William Drennan, who was charged with seditious libel in 1794. His speech on a possible peace treaty with France the following year attracted a good deal of attention and was later published. Although he was no longer an MP and took little part in public life after 1797, he is said to have eloquently opposed the Act of Union 1800. He was still well enough to attend the Carlow assizes in 1800.

== Death ==
One account of Duquerry's affliction described him, like Jonathan Swift, as "dying from the head down": this suggests a slow descent into incurable mental illness. After 1797 very little is known of his life, and he ceased to play any part in public affairs. Sometime after 1800 he retired to Bath, presumably in hope of a cure, and died there in June 1804.

He had at least one son and one daughter.
