= Nicholas Kerdiffe =

Irish barrister

Nicholas Kerdiffe (died 1609) was an Irish barrister and Law Officer of the early seventeenth century.

He was born in County Dublin: his family owned lands at Dunsink, Castleknock. His family name is a version of Cardiff, and the latter form of the name suggests that they were of Welsh origin. Sir John Kerdyffe, possibly an ancestor of Nicholas, was a Crown tenant in the liberty of Meath in 1451. James Kerdiffe of Dunsink, whose daughter Eleanor married before 1595 James Barry, Nicholas's father-in-law, as his third wife, was almost certainly a close relative of Nicholas.

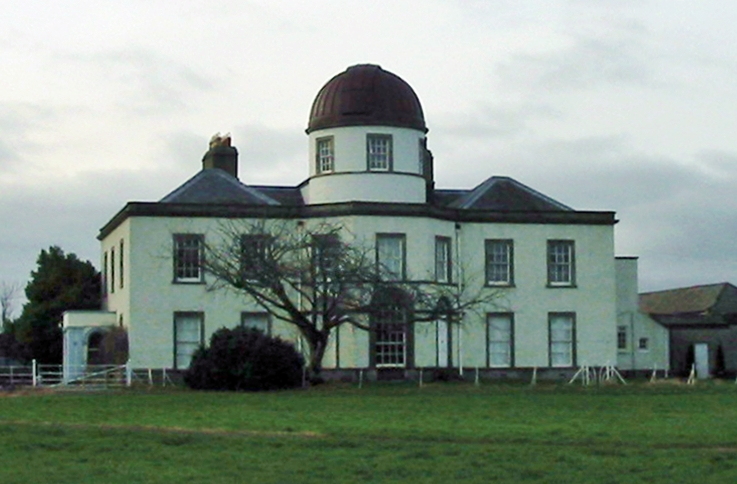
Dunsink, present day

He entered Middle Temple in 1594 and was called to the English Bar in 1600. He became Serjeant-at-law in 1601, with a salary of 27 pounds and 6 shillings per annum. Since the Serjeant was then the senior Law Officer, ranking ahead of the Attorney General for Ireland, Kerdiffe, a relatively young and inexperienced man, was a surprising choice for such an important office. Hart suggests that as Law Officer he was completely overshadowed by the Attorney General, Sir John Davis, one of the most formidable political figures in early seventeenth-century Ireland.

Nonetheless, the Serjeant had an important part to play in the administration of justice. In particular, since the expansion of the assizes system to the whole of Ireland in the early 1600s meant that the judges of the courts of common law could not cope with the additional workload, the Serjeant was often required to act as an extra judge of assize. Kerdiffe performed this task diligently enough, going on assize seven times in eight years. Assize work was onerous and time-consuming, but this was compensated for by a generous extra allowance. In 1603 his appointment was renewed by King James I. In 1604/5 he was one of several commissioners appointed to inquire into the title to land forfeited during the rebellions of the previous reign. He was also Seneschal of the Liberties of the Archdiocese of Dublin.

He married Margaret Barry, daughter of James Barry, Alderman of Dublin and his first wife Catherine Burn, daughter of one of his fellow Aldermen, Edward Burn. James Barry's third wife, Eleanor Kerdiffe of Dunsink, was almost certainly a relative, and possibly a sister, of Nicholas. The Barrys were one of Dublin's leading merchant families: Margaret's nephew was ennobled as James Barry, 1st Baron Barry of Santry in 1661 for his "eminent services" to the English Crown. Kerdiffe died in May 1609.

After Kerdiffe's death, Margaret remarried as his second wife Robert Ball, one of Dublin's leading merchants, who was Mayor of Dublin 1609-10. He was the son of Walter Ball and grandson of the Catholic martyr Margaret Ball. Robert's first wife, who died in 1620, was Jenet Ussher, daughter of Henry Ussher, Archbishop of Armagh and his first Margaret Elliott. Margaret died in 1650 at her second husband's home at Ballygall, near Glasnevin.

== Sources ==
- Hart, A.R. History of the King's Serjeant at law in Ireland Dublin Four Courts Press 2000
- Jones, Randolph A Remembrance roll from the former liberty of Meath rediscovered Virtual Record Treasury of Ireland
- Mac Lysaght, Edward The Surnames of Ireland Irish University Press 1973
- Montgomery-Massingberd, Hugh Burke's Irish Family Records London 1976
- Smyth, Constantine Joseph Chronicle of the Law Officers of Ireland Butterworths London 1838
