= Roger Owen (lawyer) =

Irish lawyer and Crown official (d. 1280)

Roger Owen (died 1280) was an Irish lawyer and Crown official. He is notable as being the first Serjeant-at-law (Ireland).

Nothing is known of his background or his early life. His appointment to the office of Serjeant was probably made in 1261. The title Serjeant-at-law was not then in use in either England or Ireland: he was called King's Serjeant or, less often, King's Pleader, while Roger himself used the Latin title of "serviens". In a letter to King Edward I of England in 1275, he described his work as being to "prosecute and defend the King's pleas in Ireland".

In this letter, Roger complains that the substantial fees promised to him by the Privy Council of Ireland had never been paid, and argues that if he had been legal advisor to some Irish magnate rather than the Crown he would have been far better rewarded. This complaint is somewhat misleading since we know that he acted for private clients as well as the Crown. In particular, he earned a retainer of 40 shillings a year from the Chapter of Saint Patrick's Cathedral, Dublin to act for them in both secular and spiritual matters: this is evidence that he was qualified in canon law as well as common law.

He died in 1280, while still in office.

== Sources ==
- Hand, Geoffrey English Law in Ireland 1290-1324 Cambridge University Press 1967
- Hart, A. R. A History of the King's Serjeants at law in Ireland Four Courts Press 2000
