= Robert Jacobe =

English-born Irish civil servant and politician

Sir Robert Jacob or Jacobe (1573–1618) was an English-born lawyer, who was Solicitor General for Ireland between 1606 and 1618. He was a close friend and political associate of Sir John Davies, the Attorney General for Ireland; both were key figures in the Irish administration during this period.

== Family ==
He was born at Higher Bockhampton, now Stinsford, in Dorset, the second son of Robert Jacob and Anne Steldon. The Jacob family were descended from William Jacob, who was living in Tolpuddle in 1450. Robert always valued his association with both towns, and when he applied for a coat of arms he described himself as Robert Jacob of Tolpuddle and Bockhampton.

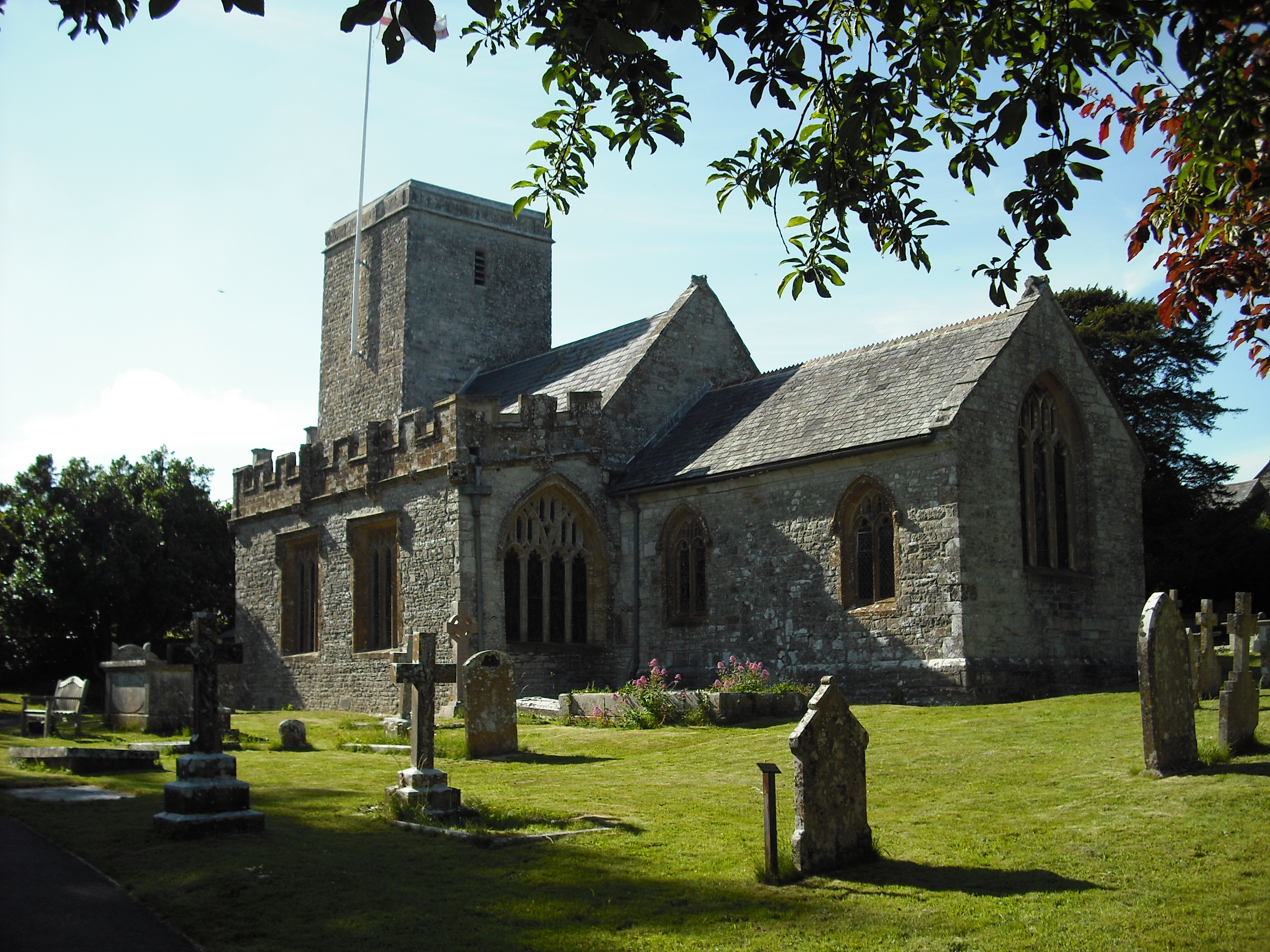
St. Michael's Church, Stinsford, Dorset: modern-day Stinsford contains the village of Higher Bockhampton, where Jacobe was born

In about 1603 he married Mary Lynch (died 1622), widow of David Targett (died 1602), who was reputedly a sailor; she was the daughter of William Lynch (or Linch), a merchant of Southampton. She had one surviving son, William Targett (died 1627), a soldier who served in Denmark, by her first husband. Mary was a colourful character with a reputation for rather bawdy wit, who once publicly ridiculed the Spanish Ambassador, Count Gondomar and quarrelled publicly with Sir John Davies' wife, Eleanor Touchet. She was known to her numerous critics as "Lusty Mall Targett, the sailor's widow". Despite much gossip about her immoral life, she seems to have been a loyal wife, who lobbied vigorously on her husband's behalf for royal office and favour. She and Robert has five children, Robert junior, Arthur, Francis, Mary junior and Anne. All of their children were still alive in 1617 when they are mentioned in their grandfather William Lynch's will (of which Lady Jacobe was the executor); but only the younger Mary is definitely known to have been still living in 1623. She married Sir James Hamilton of Manor Elieston, a cousin of the Earl of Abercorn.

== Solicitor General ==
Not much is known about his education, nor when he was called to the Bar, or his early legal career. He was knighted in 1601, and in 1606 he was sent to Ireland as Solicitor General. He was admitted to the King's Inn in 1607 and given chambers there in 1612. Like most successful men at this time he found jobs for family members: his brother Hammett became Clerk of the Peace for Dublin.

Robert sat in the Irish House of Commons as one of the two MPs for Carlow, a newly created borough, in the Parliament of 1613–1615. The 1613 election was notable for the number of disputed results and Robert, who had the usual English settler's prejudice against the Irish, wrote that "Irish lawyers did more harm than the priests; all combined in opposing the Crown's work" and complained that they were electing "seditious schismatics" (i.e. Roman Catholics) as members of Parliament. In fact when the results were finalised Protestants had a slight majority in the Commons. He was also made a Burgess of Carlow Corporation under the new Royal Charter granted to the town in 1613.

He seems to have been a highly competent lawyer, who prosecuted cases regularly before the Court of Castle Chamber (the Irish equivalent of Star Chamber) and is found giving detailed advice in 1611 on the legal aspects of the forfeiture of the O'Farrell lands in Longford.

== Politician ==
Like his friend Sir John Davies, he was as much a politician as a lawyer. As a statesman, he was deeply concerned about the future of English rule in Ireland. After the Flight of the Earls he warned in a famous phrase that "there are 2000 idle men that had no means but to feed on the gentlemen of this country....he was accounted the bravest man that comes attended with most of these followers ". He appears to have thought that the killing of Sir Cahir O'Doherty in 1608 would restore peace; yet the following year he was fearful of the possible return of Hugh O'Neill and the consequences for Ulster: "there are great probabilities that all the people of that province would easily run into rebellion if Tyrone (O'Neill) should return, or if any munition or aid should be sent to them from foreign parts".

In 1612 he wrote a lengthy memorandum on the weakness of English rule in Ireland, for which he proposed two main remedies: the restoration of a standing army, and the expulsion of the Irish chiefs from troublesome parts of the country, and their replacement by large numbers of settlers. The ordinary Irish people in his view could be left in peace, while loyal Irish chiefs would be required to surrender only a small part of their lands to the Crown (thus increasing the Crown's revenue).

During the so-called "Native's Rebellion" of 1615, a conspiracy by Hugh McShane O'Neill and other Irish nobility to massacre English and Scottish settlers in Ulster, he kept his composure. He apparently thought that the Rebellion was too badly bungled to be a serious threat to the Crown, a belief fully borne out by its ignominious failure.

== Death ==
Jacob's ambition and his undoubted ability ideally suited him to play a leading part in Irish affairs when and if Sir John Davies was recalled or promoted, but in the event he died in 1618, while Davies was still in office as Irish Attorney General. His widow Mary quickly remarried the well-known politician and poet Christopher Brooke, though she continued to use the title Lady Jacob. She had at least one more child, a son called John, and died in 1622. According to gossip, she tried to sell her husband's office, but was unsuccessful.

== Character ==
Jacob's attitude to the Irish people was stern, but in private life, he seems to have been a kindly man. In 1617 he wrote a warm and encouraging letter to his good friend and colleague Sir John Davies about the sad condition of Davies' son Jack, who was deaf and dumb, and generally thought to be mentally deficient:

" If your son Jack were now put into the hands of some skilful men, he might be brought to speak. For he is wonderfully mended in his understanding of late, for he understands anything that is spoken to him without making any signs, so as it is certain he hath his hearing".

He was apparently fond of theatre, and is believed to have taken part in a masque called Cadmus, which was performed at Dublin Castle at Christmas 1608.
