= Principal Solicitor for Ireland =

The Principal Solicitor for Ireland was one of the Irish Law Officers in the sixteenth century. The office originated in a rather unusual way, from a dispute between two rivals for the Office of Solicitor General for Ireland, Patrick Barnewall and Walter Cowley, but it survived for some decades, as it took some of the burden of work from the senior Law Officers. Since both the Solicitor General and the Principal Solicitor were colloquially referred to as the Solicitor, there is some confusion as to who held which office at which time.

The office was created on the personal initiative of Thomas Cromwell in 1537, in an effort to heal the Barnewall-Cowley feud, which he saw as weakening the position of the English Crown in Ireland. Cowley had made great efforts to force Barnewall to relinquish the office of Solicitor General, but Cromwell's compromise solution was to create a more junior office for Cowley. Cowley was disgraced and removed from office in 1546, but the Law Officers' heavy workload led to the Crown employing a Principal Solicitor until 1574, when the office lapsed on the promotion of John Bathe to Attorney General for Ireland No clear reason for the disappearance of the office can be given, although Elizabeth I is known to have had a very poor opinion of most of her Irish Law Officers, so that possibly she preferred to leave the most junior office vacant.

== List of Principal Solicitors for Ireland (1537–1574) ==
- Walter Cowley 7 September 1537 – 1546
- John Bathe 7 February 1546 – 1550
- Richard Finglas 17 October 1550 – 1554
- James Dowdall 20 July 1554 -1565
- Lucas Dillon 1565–1566
- John Bathe (cousin of the first John Bathe) 20 October 1570 – 1574

== See also ==
- Attorney General for Ireland
- Solicitor General for Ireland
