= John Bathe (politician) =

Irish barrister and judge (died c.1559)

- Died: 1559
- Occupations: Barrister and Judge.

John Bathe (died c.1559) was an Irish barrister and judge. He was a member of a famous legal dynasty, and had a distinguished career under the Tudors, holding office as Solicitor General for Ireland and Chief Justice of the Irish Common Pleas.

He was a native of County Meath, son of William Bathe, a member of the long-established Anglo-Irish Bathe family whose main seat was at Athcarne Castle. The family produced several distinguished judges and lawyers; his cousin James Bathe served as Chief Baron of the Irish Exchequer for thirty years, under four monarchs. John Bathe of Rathfeigh, living in 1405, was almost certainly a direct ancestor. Another John Bathe junior, probably a relative, was admitted to Lincoln's Inn in 1456-7, and may later have become a local judge in Ireland. The family had claimed the title Baron Louth in the fifteenth century, but their claim was disallowed by the English Crown, which bestowed it on the Plunkett family, who still hold it. His mother was Alison (or Alsona) Ussher, only daughter and heiress of Thomas Ussher and Elizabeth Cheevers, and granddaughter of Arland Ussher, who was Mayor of Dublin in 1469-70. After his father's death, she remarried John Bellew of Bellewstown. James Ussher, Archbishop of Armagh, was a cousin of a later generation.

He was at Lincoln's Inn in 1536, and was called to the Bar in 1539. He entered the King's Inns and was one of the original lessees of the Inns under the lease of 1541. A chamber in the Inns was still known as "Justice Bathe's former chamber" in the early 1600s. He was in the service of the English Crown in Ireland by 1546, when he replaced Walter Cowley as Principal Solicitor for Ireland. In 1550, he became King's Serjeant and Solicitor General. In 1554, he became Chief Justice of the Irish Common Pleas, and held office until 1559; it is unclear whether Queen Elizabeth I chose to replace the Chief Justice of her half-sister, predecessor, and rival Mary, or whether he died that year. We do know that he was highly thought of by the English Crown, being praised for "knowledge of the laws of England, diligence, discretion and loyalty".

He married Margaret Darcy, daughter of Thomas Darcy, and had at least five sons: his eldest son was Sir William Bathe of Athcarne Castle (died 1597), who was also a judge of the Court of Common Pleas. On William's death, Athcarne passed to his younger brother James, whose grandson, also called James, was a leading member of Confederate Ireland. After the English Civil War Athcarne was forfeited, but in 1665, the younger James's son Sir Luke Bathe recovered it, as a reward for what were described as his family's "sufferings in the cause of the English Crown", although they now held it, at a nominal rent, as tenants of the Crown. The Bathes remained at Athcarne until about 1700. The Chief Justice's three other sons were Luke, George and Robert.

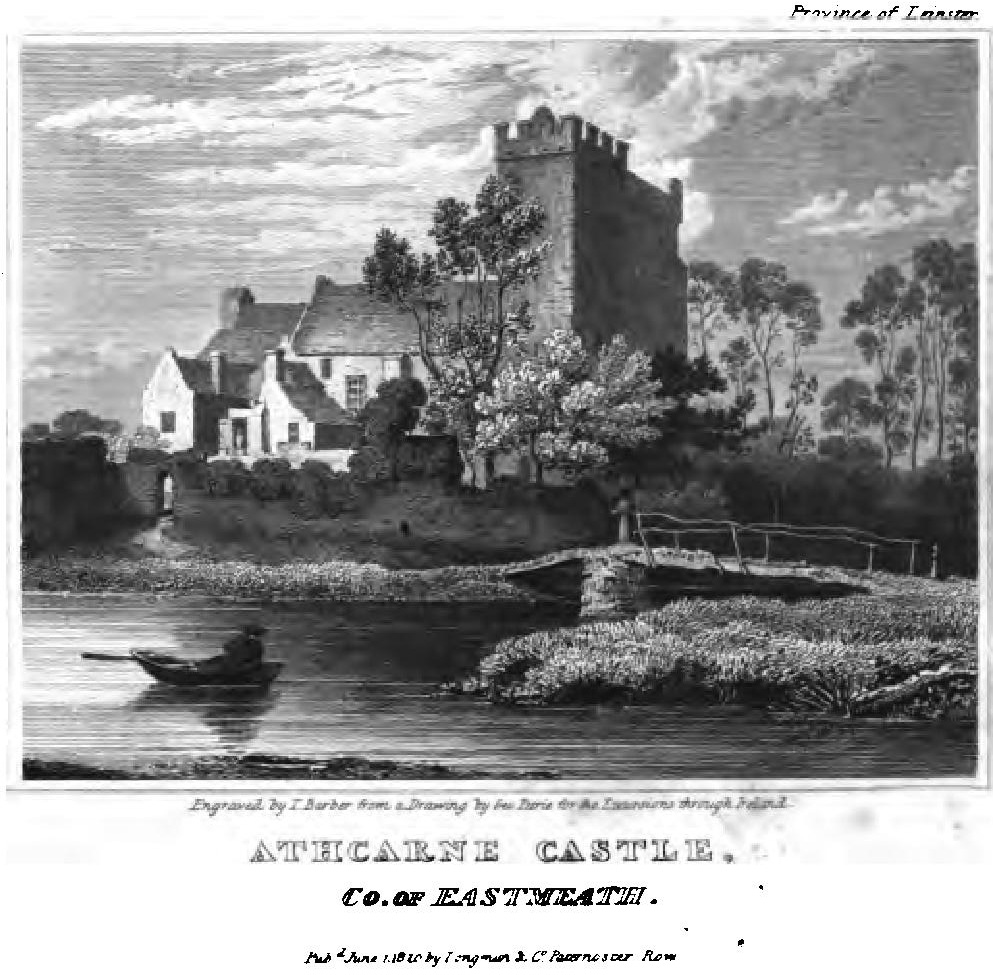
Athcarne Castle c.1820
