= Robert Bagod =

Irish judge (died 1299)

Sir Robert Bagod

1st Chief Justice of the Common Pleas for Ireland
- In office 1276 – October 1298

Personal details
- Born: Dublin
- Died: 1299 Dublin
- Children: Robert Bagod the younger
- Parent: Ralph Bagod

Sir Robert Bagod (died 1299) was an Irish judge who was appointed the first Chief Justice of the Irish Common Pleas in 1276. He built Baggotrath Castle, which was the strongest fortress in Dublin: it was located on present-day Baggot Street in central Dublin. He also founded the Carmelite Friary in Dublin.

== Early career ==
He was born in Dublin, the son of Ralph Bagod; the Bagod family had come to Ireland in the 1170s. Robert spent the earlier part of his career in Limerick, where he served as County Sheriff and Constable of King John's Castle. He was accused of misconduct in respect of his official duties in 1275 but was cleared of all charges. He was held in high regard by the English Crown: he was a friend of Robert Burnell, Bishop of Bath and Wells, the highly influential Lord Chancellor of England, and received a knighthood from King Edward I. He was excused for exceeding the permitted limits in building a house adjoining the Limerick city walls in about 1270.

== Judge ==
In 1276 the Irish Court of Common Pleas (which was often known in its early days as "the Bench") was established. Bagod was chosen to be its Chief Justice (Thomas de Chaddesworth, Dean of St Patrick's Cathedral, acted as Chief Justice for a time in a temporary capacity). He had three associate justices to serve under him; in later centuries the number of associate justices was reduced to two. He was also required to act as a justice in eyre, i.e. an itinerant justice, when necessary, although the eyre system was rapidly falling into disuse in Ireland during his term on the Bench, and was rarely used after 1290. In addition to his judicial office, he served as Deputy Treasurer of Ireland. He was regularly called on to sit on special commissions, both in Ireland and England, most notably the commission of inquiry of 1293-4 into alleged misconduct by William de Vesci, the Justiciar of Ireland. With the other members of the commission, who included Sir William de Essendon and Sir Walter de la Haye, he was ordered to appear before King Edward and the Parliament in April 1294 to report on their findings.

In 1293-4 he and his colleagues heard a lawsuit between John Cogan and the Abbey of St Thomas the Martyr near Dublin, on the disputed ownership of lands at Ballymckelly, County Dublin.

In 1294 Bartholemew Dardiz complained to the Privy Council that Bagod and his fellow Justices had heard an inheritance dispute between himself and his cousin Thomas Dardiz concerning lands at Castlekeeran, County Meath (only a ruined monastery survives there today), and had found in his favour, but that the judgment had not been executed. The Council ordered that the records be searched for in the Irish Treasury (Exchequer of Ireland), where they had been deposited, and when located that they be sent to Bagod and his colleagues so that they might execute the judgment. Numerous similar requests from the Council over the following years to be informed of the outcome of individual cases suggest a degree of unhappiness with the efficiency of the Court's procedures.

He was a valued Crown servant: in 1281 he received an unspecified financial reward for his loyalty, and in 1284 in consideration of his long service he was excused from going on assize (always an onerous task, in view of the bad roads and perennial threat of assault or highway robbery). He retired on health grounds in October 1298, when he was described as being too "old and infirm" to continue in office. He probably died early in the following year.

== Family ==
His eldest son and heir, Sir Robert Bagod the younger (died c. 1330), was, like his father, a knight who served as High Sheriff of County Limerick and a justice of the Common Pleas. The younger Robert resigned or was dismissed from the Bench in about 1324. Two of Sir Robert's grandsons, Thomas and Hervey, were also High Court judges. Thomas was probably the Thomas Bagod who owned the lands which later became the site of Merrion Castle in the 1330s.

== Landowner ==
In 1280 he bought the lands which were then called "the Rath", subsequently called Baggotrath or Baggotstrath, from the Hyntenbergh family. He built Baggotrath Castle, which later passed from the Bagods to the Fitzwilliam family. It was severely damaged during the English Civil War, allowed to fall into ruin by its owners, and demolished in the early nineteenth century. The family name is commemorated in Baggot Street and nearby Baggotrath Place. The Hyntenberghs also sold him a stone dwelling house near present-day Werburgh Street. In addition, he acquired lands in Dundrum, Dublin, which his son later sold to the le Poer family. There was also the Limerick property, originally called Brownstown: his son made Limerick the main family residence.

Possibly his proudest achievement was founding Ireland's only Carmelite Friary in Dublin in about 1274, despite considerable local opposition. It apparently stood on the same site as the present Whitefriar Street Carmelite Church.

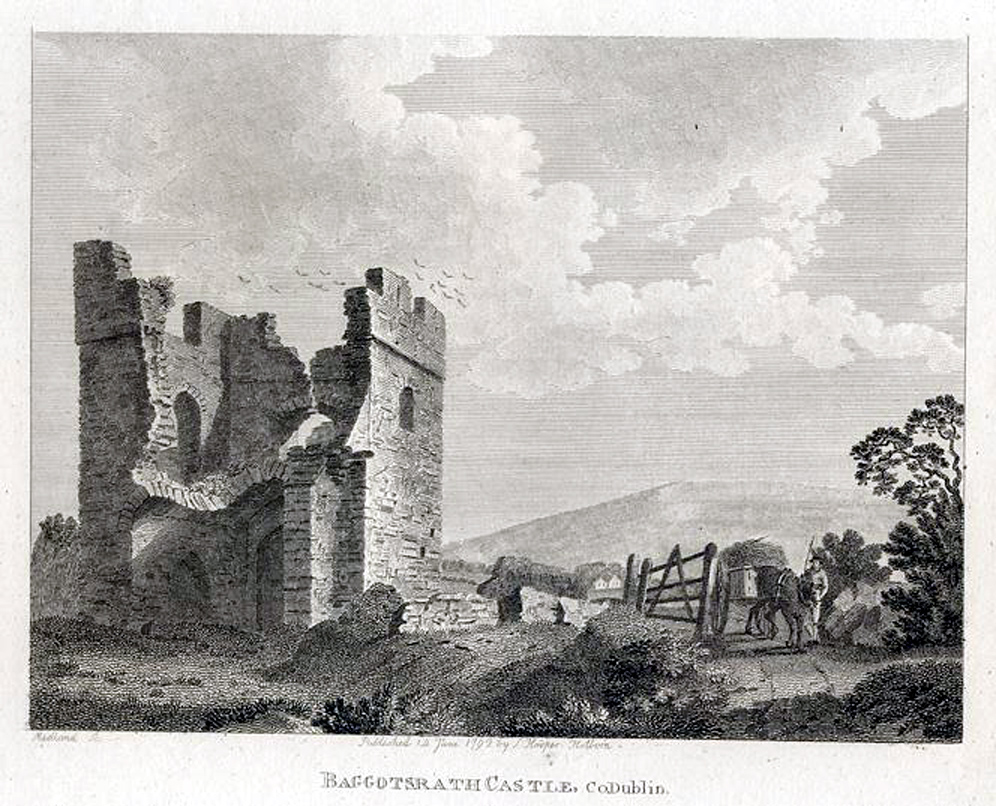
Ruins of Baggotrath Castle, which Robert built, 1792

He has been described as a man of energy and ability, noted for his loyalty to the Crown and for the confidence the Government placed in him.

Baggot Street in Dublin was named after him.

The Red Book of the Exchequer at Dublin gives his date of death as 6 January 1298, but this is probably a slip for 1299, as the Patent Rolls clearly date his retirement to October 1298.
