= Hugh Canoun =

English judge in Ireland (d. 1317 or 1318)

Hugh Canoun, or Hugh Canon (died December 1317/January 1318) was an English-born judge in early fourteenth-century Ireland. He was a justice of the Court of Common Pleas (Ireland) and served as Deputy Justiciar of Ireland. As a judge he was praised for his good and faithful service to the English Crown, and as a lawyer he was known as "a man very knowledgeable about all the King's business". On the other hand, his loyalty to the Crown during the Scottish Invasion of Ireland in 1315-18 was said to be extremely doubtful, although he was saved from disgrace by his influential connections. He was murdered by Andrew de Bermingham of Athenry in 1317/18, during the last months of the Bruce Invasion, in the course of a private feud, of which little is known.

== Early career ==
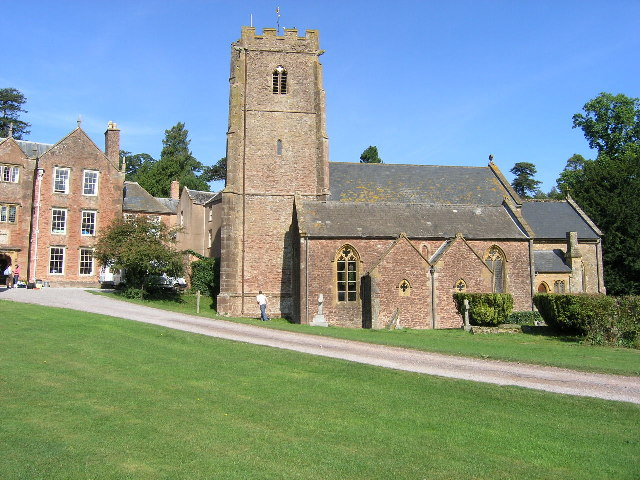
Nettlecombe, Somerset, Canoun's birthplace

He was a native of the parish of Woodford, Somerset (now Nettlecombe), where he owned a "house and close (enclosure)"; he later complained that his house had been ransacked during his long absence abroad. He was in Ireland, presumably practising law, by 1294. He was High Sheriff of Kildare in 1306, and apparently aimed to become a substantial landowner in County Kildare.

== Judge ==
He was appointed to the Irish Court of Common Pleas (which was then usually called "the Bench") in 1308, on the nomination of Piers Gaveston, the Lord Lieutenant of Ireland and prime Royal favourite. He was also made Chief Escheator of Ireland in 1310 and a justice in eyre i.e. an itinerant justice, in the same year, along with Walter de Cusack and David le Blond, though he seems to have sat only in County Dublin. This may have been the last Dublin eyre (circuit): the system gradually fell into disuse in Ireland from about 1280 onwards and was obsolete by 1325. In any case, the Dublin eyre ended the following year after objections from the litigants that the judges were applying English law, rather than local customary law. In 1310 and again in 1311 he was hearing the assizes in County Carlow.

In 1311 he was "impleaded", i.e. prosecuted, at Westminster on charges connected to the conduct of his judicial duties. He took the precaution of obtaining letters of protection from several of the leading figures in Ireland, including the Earl of Ulster and the Justiciar of Ireland, John Wogan, and their support resulted in the charges being dropped. He was held in high regard by his judicial colleagues, one of whom, possibly Sir Richard de Exeter, wrote a letter describing Hugh as "the man most knowledgeable in the various kinds of business which concern the King".

He resigned, or was removed, from the Court of Common Pleas in 1315, and was replaced by William of Bardfield. He was appointed a justice of the Justiciar's Court in the same year, and served as Deputy Justiciar in 1316. He was also appointed Chief Justice in Eyre.

== Bruce Invasion 1315-18 ==
During the Scottish Invasion of Ireland of 1315-18, his loyalty to the English Crown was deeply suspect. He was a supporter of Richard Óg de Burgh, 2nd Earl of Ulster, who had shown his regard for him in 1311, when Hugh was impleaded at Westminster. Ulster's daughter Elizabeth had married the Scottish King, Robert the Bruce, raising inevitable suspicions about her father's loyalties, although in fact the Earl opposed the Bruces, and fought for the Crown during the Invasion. In 1317 it was rumoured that Canoun had ordered his brother-in-law to guide Robert's brother Edward Bruce, who led the invading forces, through County Kildare.

There appears to be no firm evidence of Canoun's disloyalty to the Crown. Similar accusations were made against his colleague Sir Richard de Exeter, the Chief Justice of the Irish Common Pleas, whose daughter had married Walter de Lacy, a known rebel and supporter of the Bruces. A petition asking for Exeter to be removed from office was not acted on.

No proceedings were taken against Canoun, and he received a pardon in 1317 covering all his alleged acts of treason. As on previous occasions, he could rely on his powerful connections for protection, but his career ended abruptly when he was murdered shortly afterwards, in a private feud with the de Berminghams of Athenry.

== Later years ==
In 1316 Canoun petitioned the Crown for a grant of the lands of Rathcoffey, County Kildare, and also Clane, Mainham and other lands in the barony of Ikeathy and Oughterany, which had reverted to the Crown on the death of Isabel, widow of Henry de Rochford. The official endorsement on the petition praised Hugh for his good and faithful service as a judge in Ireland (this was evidently before he fell under suspicion of disloyalty during the Bruce Invasion), but the relevant official, John Hotham, Bishop of Ely, clearly had doubts about the propriety of making the grant in question, since John Wogan, the former Justiciar of Ireland, already held the lands. The grant to Wogan was confirmed shortly afterwards, and his descendants built Rathcoffey Castle on the lands.

In 1317 Hugh received a full royal pardon for all "trespasses" committed by him, in consideration of his good services to the Crown. This is almost certainly a reference to his equivocal role during the Scots invasion.

The ruins of Rathcoffey Castle: Hugh unsuccessfully petitioned for a grant of the lands of Rathcoffey

== Murder ==
Grace's manuscript Annales Hiberniae and several other sources agree that Canoun was assassinated in late 1317 or early 1318 by Andrew de Bermingham, a younger son of Rickard de Bermingham, Lord of Athenry, as a result of a long-standing feud, of which few details survive. The murder took place between Naas and Castlemartin in County Kildare. The news reached the authorities in Dublin "at the Feast of the Epiphany" (6 January 1318), so the killing probably occurred at the end of the previous year. De Bermingham himself was murdered a few years later, in the course of an unrelated feud with the O'Nolans family. Curiously, no action seems to have been taken against him for Canoun's murder, despite the victim's eminence.

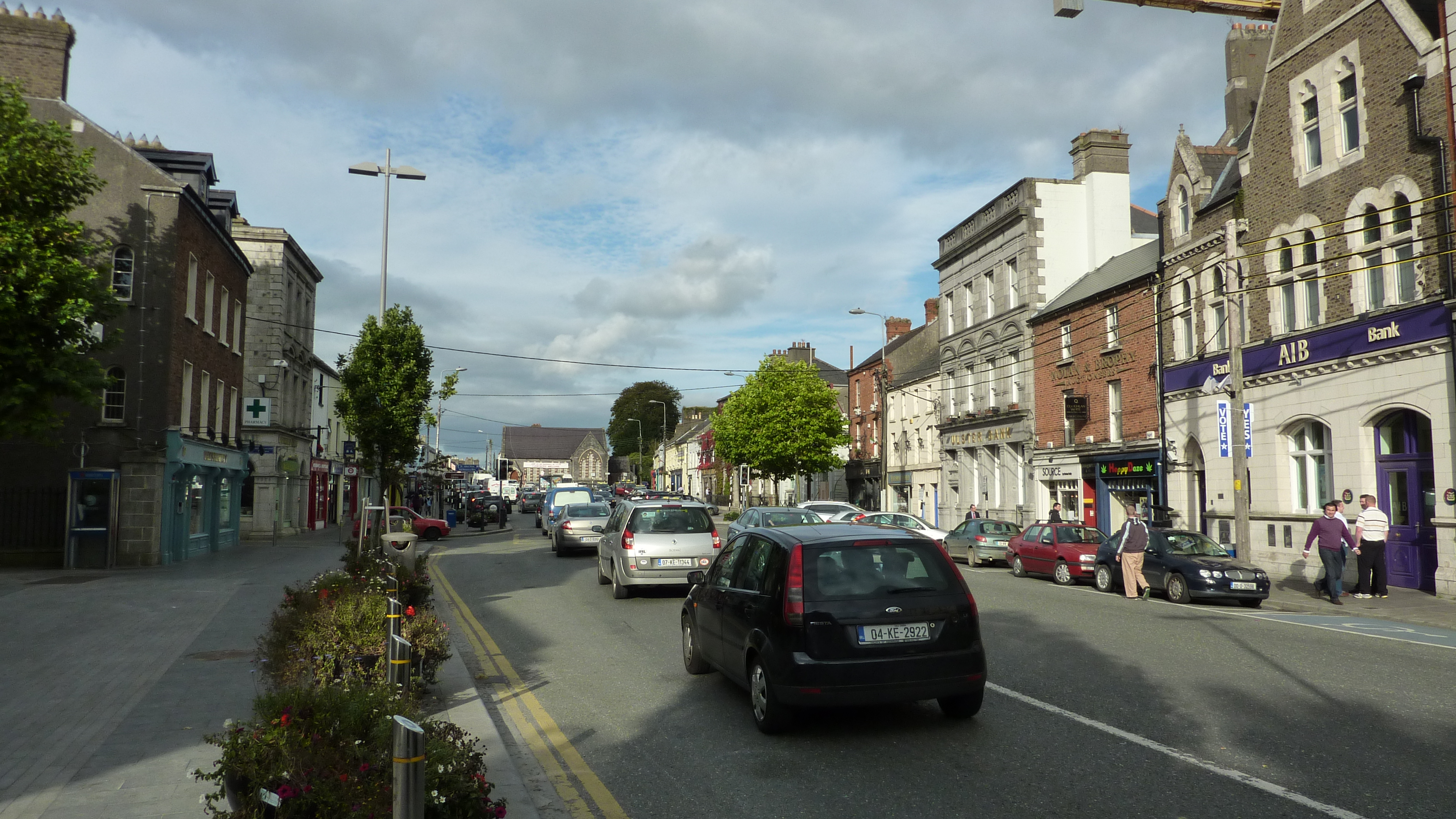
Naas, present day: Canoun was murdered near the town in late 1317

== Family ==
Hugh's wife was called Albreda. It is likely that they had sons, as in his petition for possession of Rathcoffey he specified that the lands should descend by entail male, i.e. to his male heirs, but nothing seems to be known of them.

He has been described as a figure of very considerable importance in early fourteenth-century Ireland.

== Sources ==
- Ball, F. Elrington The Judges in Ireland 1221-1921 London John Murray 1926
- Grace, James Annales Hiberniae Edited by Richard Butler; published by the Irish Archaeological Society Dublin 1842
- Hand, Geoffrey English Law in Ireland 1290-1324 Cambridge University Press 1967
- Hart, A.R. A History of the King's Serjeants-at-law in Ireland Four Courts Press Dublin 2000
- James Mac Geoghegan, Abbé (Abbé Mac-Geoghegan) History of Ireland, Ancient and Modern Paris 1738. Translated from the French by Patrick O'Kelly. Published by O'Flanagan Dublin 1831.
- National Archives Petition of Hugh Canoun (or Canon) Ref. SC/8/331/15696B
- Otway-Ruthven, A.J. A History of Medieval Ireland Barnes and Noble reissue New York 1993
- Patent Rolls Edward II
