= Thomas Cusack (Irish judge) =

Anglo-Irish judge and statesman

Sir Thomas Cusack (also spelt Cusacke or Cusake) (c. 1505–1571) was an Anglo-Irish judge and statesman of the sixteenth century, who held the offices of Master of the Rolls in Ireland, Lord Chancellor of Ireland, and Chancellor of the Exchequer of Ireland, and sat in the Irish House of Commons. He was one of the most trusted and dependable Crown servants of his time, although he led a somewhat turbulent private life.

He was an ancestor of the Duke of Wellington. He was also the fourth of the six husbands of Jenet Sarsfield, who was his third wife.

== Background ==
Thomas Cusack was the eldest son of John Cusack of Cussington, (Note: Now Cushinstown, near Dunboyne) County Meath, and his first wife Alison de Wellesley, youngest daughter of Sir William de Wellesley of Dangan Castle and his wife Ismay Plunket of Killeen Castle, daughter of Sir Thomas Fitz-Christopher Plunket and his second wife Marian Cruise, or Cruys. Both his parents came from long-established families of the Pale; John was a cousin of an earlier Thomas Cusacke of Gerrardstown who was Attorney General for Ireland in 1480 and Lord Chief Justice of Ireland from 1490 to 1494. It is less clear if Thomas Cusack, Recorder of Dublin in 1487/8, belonged to the same family: Cusack was also a common enough name in Dublin. After Alison's death, John remarried Elinor Delahide of Moyglare Hall, County Kildare.

The Cusack family of Cushinstown were descended from Walter de Cusack, son of Sir Andrew Cusack of Gerrardstown, a leading judge and soldier in the early fourteenth century. An earlier John Cusack is recorded at Cushinstown in the 1380s: his daughter married Peter Hussey, Baron Galtrim. Nicholas Cusack, Bishop of Kildare 1279–99, was another member of the family.

Thomas had four younger brothers and seven sisters, including:

- Mary (Maria), a nun who became the last Abbess of Lismullen
- Anne, who married Thomas Finglas, son of Patrick Finglas, Lord Chief Justice of Ireland and had issue
- Johanna, who married Sir Garret Fleming, a close relative of Christopher Fleming, 8th Baron Slane
- Catherine, who married Nicholas Wafer, a retainer of Silken Thomas, who later became notorious as one of the assassins of Archbishop John Alen
- Thomasine, who married Christopher Dowdall of County Louth, and was the mother of James Dowdall. James, a future Lord Chief Justice of Ireland was a favourite of his uncle Thomas, who encouraged him to pursue a legal career.

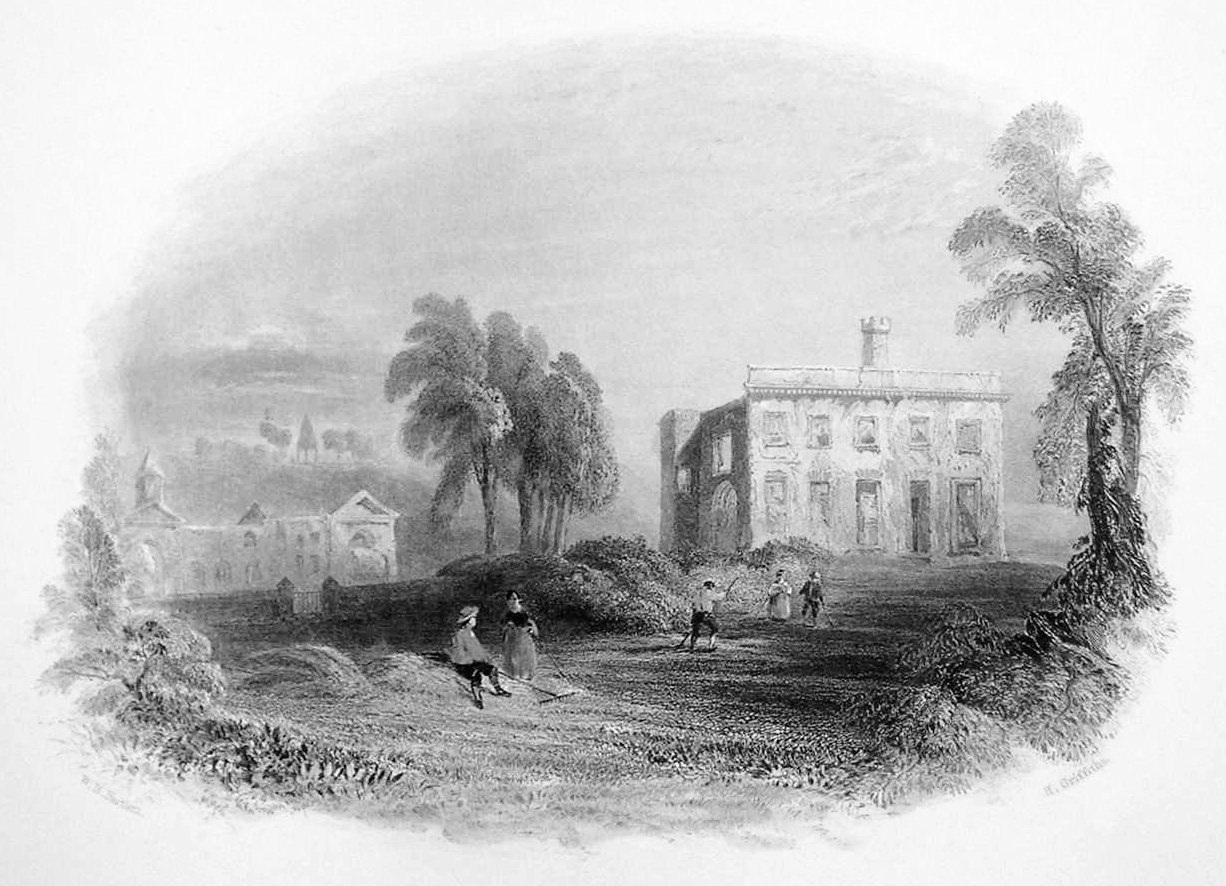
Dangan Castle, the ancestral home of Thomas Cusack's mother, Alison de Wellesley

== Early career ==
Little is known of his life until he entered the Inner Temple in 1522: he became Master of the Revels there in 1524. He married his first wife Joan Hussey in about 1515.

The rebellion of Silken Thomas does not seem to have hindered his career, even though his brother-in-law Nicholas Wafer was deeply implicated in the rebellion, becoming infamous as the killer of Archbishop Alen. His stepmother's family, the Delahides of Moyglare, were also heavily involved in the Rebellion, and were regarded as its "prime instigators".

Cusack relied on the patronage of Thomas Cromwell, who was then the most powerful minister at the English Court, to further his own career; he lobbied Cromwell for the Irish Chancellorship of the Exchequer, and on payment of £10 (a large sum at the time), he received the office in 1533. In 1534 when a vacancy opened on the Court of Common Pleas, he again lobbied for the office, with the assistance of his wealthy cousin Lady Neville, who spent £100 in bribes (then a considerable amount) to obtain the office for him.

Despite his use of bribery to gain office, Cusack was highly regarded as a judge: O'Flanagan praises his practical common sense, his ability to discern the truth of any case and his minute attention to detail. He showed no prejudice against Irish-speaking plaintiffs, and gained a reputation on the Bench for integrity and moderation.

== Politician ==
His first term as a judge lasted for less than a year: he was summarily dismissed from the bench, apparently following a quarrel with Cromwell. There were rumours that he had embezzled exchequer funds, although he was generally considered an honest man by the standards of the age. His disgrace was short-lived, and he was soon reconciled with Cromwell. He sat on a commission to inquire into the governance of Ireland, and later on the commission for the dissolution of the monasteries. For his good services to the Crown he received as his reward Lismullen Abbey, near Navan, despite the fact that his sister Mary was the abbess of Lismullen: Mary was required to go through the humiliation of making a supposedly "voluntary" surrender of the abbey into her brother's hands. Lismullen became one of the principal family residences, along with Cussington, but a bitter controversy over the rightful ownership of Lismullen led to years of litigation after Thomas' death. It remained in Cusack hands into the next century, when it passed by marriage to the Dillon family. His father died, aged about eighty-two, in 1537, and Thomas duly inherited Cussington. The Crown confirmed the grant of Lismullen and the lands adjoining it to Thomas in 1547.

He entered the Irish House of Commons in 1536 and was elected its Speaker in 1541, having been knighted the previous year. As speaker, he played a role in securing the passage of the Crown of Ireland Act 1542, acknowledging Henry VIII as King of Ireland. His opening speech to the Commons as speaker was a defence of royal policy, and in particular of the breach with the Papacy and the suppression of the monasteries. The Lord Justice of Ireland praised him as one who had done faithful and diligent service and cared for nothing but the king's honour. The king himself also spoke highly of him as "a man of wit, good service and affection".

In 1541 he furnished the king with a treatise on the question of making gifts of land to his Irish subjects. True to his reputation for impartiality, he urged that the old Irish be treated as subjects of the Crown, not its enemies and that they be given the full benefits of English common law. This was in line with the new policy of "surrender and regrant". In opposition to those who urged extreme measures to suppress Shane O'Neill and, later, Gerald FitzGerald, 15th Earl of Desmond, Cusack constantly urged a policy of conciliation.

== Master and Chancellor ==
In 1542 Cusack became Master of the Rolls in Ireland. This was still a relatively junior office, and at that time it was mainly administrative rather than judicial in nature. He had custody of all records of the Court of Chancery and power to hear lawsuits. He seems to have held the office for only a year, and was replaced by Nicholas Wycombe. He was appointed High Sheriff of Meath in 1543 and raised troops in that county for service abroad; he also assisted in the defence of the Pale in 1548.

Having already been appointed Lord Keeper of the Great Seal of Ireland in 1546, he was in 1551 made Lord Chancellor of Ireland by Edward VI on account of his "wisdom, learning, great experience and grave behaviour", and received an increase in salary. His duties were executive as well as judicial and he was sent to impose martial law in Connaught, a task in which he showed considerable severity. O'Flanagan states that the judicial business of the Chancellor in his time was largely routine. He was appointed Lord Justice of Ireland, to govern in the absence of the Lord Deputy, in 1552. With Sir Anthony St. Leger, the strong-minded and turbulent Lord Deputy, Cusack (unlike many of his colleagues) was always on friendly terms.

Although Cusack was a supporter of the Reformation, and a notorious profiteer from the sale of monasteries, the devoutly Roman Catholic Queen Mary I on her accession showed him no ill-will on account of his religious beliefs. Instead, she wrote to him in glowing terms praising the diligent service he had given her brother for which she gave thanks, and continued him in office. She may have been aware that Cusack himself had leanings towards the Catholic faith, as did several of his children and grandchildren (though not his eldest son Robert, who was a convinced Protestant). In time however, they quarrelled over her religious policy, in particular, her decision to restore the chapter of St Patrick's Cathedral, Dublin, which her brother had suppressed in 1547, a quarrel which led to his temporary disgrace. He was later to complain of the expenses he had incurred in her service, which left him heavily in debt.

== Last years ==
He was superseded as Lord Chancellor in 1555, following his quarrel with the Queen, which also led to a brief spell in the Tower of London, a heavy fine and his temporary disgrace. He returned to politics after a short interval and was elected as member of the House of Commons for Athenry in 1559 (presumably an absentee member, as his age and health would have ruled out the long journey from Meath to County Galway). He became personally known to Elizabeth I and performed a number of diplomatic missions on her behalf: he settled a dispute between Thomas Butler, 10th Earl of Ormond and Gerald FitzGerald, 15th Earl of Desmond in 1560, and negotiated with Shane O'Neill. In 1564-5 he showed considerable ruthlessness in the pacification of Munster. He was anxious to resume the Lord Chancellorship and lobbied repeatedly to be restored. It seems that he was actually promised a return to the office in 1563, but the promise was not fulfilled, perhaps an early sign that his relationship with the Queen was becoming fraught. He remained a valued member of the Privy Council of Ireland, though he often complained that his advice was not listened to. Relations with Elizabeth soured, as she became increasingly sceptical about his policy of conciliation, and in the last two years of his life, he took little part in public affairs.

== Death and memorial ==
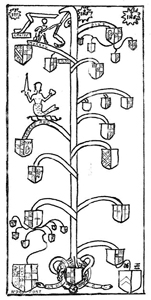
Cusack Family Tree with Mermaid and Motto

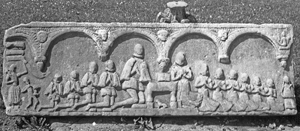
Memorial to Sir Thomas, his second wife Maud Darcy and their children

The Cusack family crest includes a mermaid brandishing a sword as depicted on a family tree memorial stone for Sir Thomas

Although he complained of constant illness, Cusack, like his father, lived to be over eighty. He died in 1571 and is buried at Trevet, County Meath. A memorial to Cusack and his second wife Maud Darcy was raised in Trevet Church (now a ruin) by his son John, who reputedly carved it, and it still exists in a fragmentary form. Cusack praises his wife generously but his own good qualities even more:

"Virtue begat me. Piety cherished me. Honour increased me. Skill set me high. Let long lived renown hand down my days. As Lord Chancellor I administered the laws.....".

== Marriages ==
O'Flanagan's claim that Cusack led a simple domestic life hardly gives a full or accurate picture of his decidedly troubled marital career. His first wife was a distant cousin, Joan Hussey, with whom he had at least three children. In 1537 the marriage was annulled on the grounds of consanguinity, but it is likely that unhappy personal differences were the real reason for the end of the marriage. In later years Cusack was accused of inciting his servants to adultery with Joan to give him grounds for divorce, although this is probably untrue. It was noteworthy that he always refused to admit that there had ever been a valid marriage between Joan and himself, and always referred to Maud Darcy as his first wife. Joan remarried into the prominent Bathe family of Drumcondra, Dublin and was still living in 1581; Thomas, perhaps in a belated acknowledgement of her rights, left her a small legacy.

His second marriage was far more controversial since Maud Darcy was rumoured to have had her first husband, James Marward, titular Baron Skryne, murdered by Richard Fitzgerald, a younger son of Gerald FitzGerald, 8th Earl of Kildare. She then married Fitzgerald, who was later executed for treason for his part in the Silken Thomas rebellion, whereupon Maud having obtained a pardon for her complicity in her husband's treason, quickly married Cusack. The marriage seems to have been a happy one, and the effigy on their tomb contains a warm tribute by Cusack to his "wife blessed". She belonged to the prominent Darcy family of Platten, County Meath: she was the daughter of George Darcy and his wife Jane Riccard, and the granddaughter of Sir William Darcy, Vice-Treasurer of Ireland, and Margaret St Lawrence.

After Maud's death, Cusack became the fourth husband of the much-married Jenet Sarsfield. Though it was clearly not a love marriage (Jenet showed a keen interest in securing as much of the Cusack family property as possible, while her husband needed her money to pay off his heavy debts) it seems to have been reasonably happy. However a bitter feud developed between Jenet and her stepson Edward, and Thomas' will, which left Lismullen Abbey to his widow, led to years of litigation between the two. Cussington passed to John, Thomas' grandson by his first marriage. Jenet died in 1598, having made two further marriages. Edward Cusack was convicted of treason in 1582 along with Nicholas Nugent, but received a full pardon.

== Descendants ==
By his first wife, Thomas had three children, of whom one predeceased him. The Trevet effigy states that he and Maud had thirteen children, of whom three seem to have predeceased him. Of his sixteen children, eight can be identified with certainty:

- Robert, second Baron of the Exchequer (died 1570), who married Katherine Nugent (possibly a second marriage) and had at least seven children including John Cusack of Cussington, Fr Christopher Cusack, founder of the Irish College, Douai, and Elizabeth, mother of Fr Patrick Fleming
- Edward (died 1596) of Lismullen, who married Elizabeth Aylmer and had at least six children, including Richard, his heir, James, a leading member of Confederate Ireland, and Anne, who married firstly Sir Ambrose Forth, Judge of the Admiralty Court (died 1610), secondly Christopher Nugent, a younger brother of Richard Nugent, 1st Earl of Westmeath, and thirdly, before 1637, Valerian Wellesley
- John
- Catherine (died 1598), who married firstly Sir Henry Colley and secondly William Eustace of Castlemartin
- Mary, who married Theobald Butler, 1st Baron Cahir and had seven children
- Alice, who married Sir Christopher Bellew of Bellewstown
- Margaret, who married Murrough McDermot O'Brien, 3rd Baron Inchiquin and had seven children
- Alison, who married Thomas Aylmer.

From Catherine Cusack and her first husband, Henry Colley descended the Colley family who acquired the title Earl of Mornington. They changed their name to Wellesley (they had Wellesley blood through Thomas Cusack's mother Alison de Wellesley, and there were several later Cusack-Wellesley marriages, including Ann Cusack's marriage to Valerian Wellesley) and produced, among numerous other descendants, the 1st Duke of Wellington.

The Cusack-Smith baronets of Tuam were also descended in the female line from Sir Thomas.

== Character ==
Despite his somewhat troubled private life, his willingness to acquire monastic lands, his use of bribery to gain office, and one allegation early in his career of embezzlement of Crown funds, Thomas Cusack is generally judged to have been one of the finest public servants of his time. Writing in 1992, Colum Kenny has described him as "one of the most loyal and respected political figures in Ireland" in his time.

== Notes ==
Political offices
Preceded by Not known	Speaker of the Irish House of Commons; 1541–1543	Succeeded by James Stanyhurst
Preceded by Sir John Alan	Lord Chancellor of Ireland; 1551–1554	Succeeded by Sir William FitzWilliam
