= 1954 Meath Intermediate Football Championship =

Meath I.F.C.
- Season: 1954
- Champions: Ballinlough; 1st Intermediate Football Championship title
- Relegated: Dunderry; Kilcloon

The 1954 Meath Intermediate Football Championship was the 28th edition of the Meath GAA's premier club Gaelic football tournament for intermediate graded teams in County Meath, Ireland. The tournament consisted of 8 teams. The championship applied a league format.

Slane were regraded from the 1953 S.F.C.

At the end of the season, Dunderry and Kilcloon applied to be regraded to the 1955 J.F.C.

Ballinlough claimed their first Intermediate championship title after finishing top of the table. Their win was sealed by the defeat of Slane 4-11 to 1-9 at Pairc Tailteann on 29 August 1954.

== Team changes ==
The following teams changed division since the 1953 championship season.

=== From I.F.C. ===
Promoted to 1954 S.F.C.

- St. Vincent's

Relegated to 1954 J.F.C.

- Carnaross
- Castletown
- Donore
- Kilberry
- Longwood

=== To I.F.C. ===
Regraded from 1953 S.F.C.

- Slane

Promoted from 1953 J.F.C.

- Drumbaragh - (Junior Runners-Up & Kells District Champions)
- Navan O'Mahonys 'B' - (Junior Quarter-Finalists & Navan District Champions)

Neither of the 1953 J.F.C. semi-finalists, Shale Rovers (North Meath District Champions) nor Curraha (Tara District Champions), were promoted.

== League table, fixtures and results ==
The club with the best record were declared I.F.C. champions. Many results were unavailable in the Meath Chronicle.

Team	Pld	W	L	D	PF	PA	PD	Pts
Ballinlough	6	5	0	1	0	0	+0	11
Slane	4	3	1	0	0	0	+0	6
Duleek	4	2	0	2	0	0	+0	6
Drumbaragh	3	1	2	0	0	0	+0	2
Ballinabrackey	2	0	1	1	0	0	+0	1
Dunderry	2	0	2	0	0	0	+0	0
Kilcloon	2	0	2	0	0	0	+0	0
Navan O'Mahonys 'B'	2	0	2	0	0	0	+0	0

Round 1:

- Ballinlough 3-4, 1-2 Navan O'Mahonys 'B', Kells, 28/2/1954,
- Slane -vs- Ballinabrackey, Trim, 28/2/1954,
- Drumbaragh 0-11, 2-1 Kilcloon, Skryne, 7/3/1954,
- Duleek -vs- Dunderry, Skryne, 7/3/1954,

Round 2:

- Duleek 1-8, 0-1 Kilcloon, Pairc Tailteann, 21/3/1954,
- Drumbaragh -vs- Ballinabrackey, Ballivor, 11/4/1954,
- Ballinlough 2-6, 0-8 Dunderry, Kells, 25/4/1954,
- Slane 1-5, 1-1 Navan O'Mahonys 'B', Stackallen, 2/5/1954,

Round 3:

- Ballinlough 0-4, 1-1 Duleek, Pairc Tailteann, 2/5/1954,
- Slane 0-8, 2-1 Drumbaragh, Pairc Tailteann, 16/5/1954,
- Dunderry -vs- Kilcloon, Rathmolyon, 23/5/1954,
- Navan O'Mahonys 'B' -vs- Ballinabrackey,

Round 4:

- Ballinlough 2-9, 0-3 Ballinabrackey, Ballivor, 20/6/1954,
- Duleek 1-6, 1-3 Drumbaragh, Pairc Tailteann, 18/7/1954,
- Slane 3-6, 0-4 Dunderry, Kilberry, 18/7/1954,
- Navan O'Mahonys 'B' -vs- Kilcloon,

Round 5:

- Duleek 2-2, 2-2 Ballinabrackey, Warrenstown, 15/8/1954,
- Ballinalough -vs- Drumbaragh,
- Navan O'Mahonys 'B' -vs- Dunderry,
- Slane -vs- Kilcloon,

Round 6:

- Ballinlough 4-11, 1-9 Slane, Pairc Tailteann, 29/8/1954,
- Ballinabrackey -vs- Kilcloon, Enfield, 29/8/1954,
- Drumbaragh -vs- Dunderry,
- Duleek -vs- Navan O'Mahonys 'B',

Round 7:

- Ballinlough w, l Kilcloon,
- Ballinabrackey -vs- Dunderry,
- Drumbaragh -vs- Navan O'Mahonys 'B',
- Slane -vs- Duleek,
