= Joseph O'Leary =

Joseph O'Leary may refer to:

- Joseph O'Leary (journalist) (c. 1795–1845), Irish journalist and songwriter
- Joe O'Leary (1883–1963), New Zealand rugby union player
- Joseph V. O'Leary (1890–1964), American politician
- Joseph S. O'Leary (born 1949), Irish Roman Catholic theologian
