= David le Blond =

Notorious judge in Ireland

David le Blond (died after 1311) was an Irish judge in the reign of King Edward II of England, who was notorious for corruption.

He may have been a native of County Cork, where he later acquired substantial lands, allegedly by underhanded means. It is unclear if he was a relative of his contemporary and fellow judge Richard le Blond, who was a Wicklow man. He is said to have had influential family connections, but nothing is known of them.

He is first heard of in 1302, when he was described as "master" (at the time this meant that he had a University degree), and he is known to have been a clerk in holy orders. He began his career as an assistant to the Chief Escheator of Ireland. He was appointed an itinerant justice, and went regularly on the Munster assizes with his colleague Henry Cogan. In 1308 he was appointed a justice of the Court of the Justiciar of Ireland, in the place of Sir John de Fressingfield, who had returned to England in the hope of appointment to a permanent position on the Bench there. In 1310 he was hearing pleas in the Justiciar's place, and in September of the same year was appointed a justice in eyre for County Dublin, together with several other senior judges, including Hugh Canoun, Walter de Cusack and Robert Bagod. The eyre was cancelled in 1311, after protests from the Dubliners that they were not accustomed to having lawsuits determined by English law, rather than customary Irish law. He is thought to have stepped down as a judge soon afterwards.

He had an unenviable reputation for corruption: in 1308, the year he was appointed to the Justiciar's Court, he was accused of acquiring large amounts of land over the previous four years by means of champerty and maintenance (collusive litigation), conspiracy and fraud. In one petition for redress, the petitioner claimed that le Blond had wrongfully dispossessed him of land in Cork, leaving him, his wife and their children reduced to having to beg for their living. He argued that he could not hope to get impartial justice, as le Blond was a judge and was related to "the great lords of the land" (unnamed). Accordingly, he petitioned for a special hearing before two named individuals whom he evidently trusted. The petition was apparently taken seriously, as it was referred to the Lord Chancellor of England for a quick decision, but le Blond remained on the Court for at least another two years.

== Sources ==
- Ball, F. Elrington The Judges in Ireland 1221-1921 London John Murray 1926
- Hand, Geoffrey English Law in Ireland 1290-1324 Cambridge University Press 1967
- Patent Roll 4 Edward II
