= Robert Bagod the younger =

Sir Robert Bagod (died after 1329) was a judge, Crown servant and military commander in fourteenth-century Ireland.

He was the eldest son of the judge and landowner Sir Robert Bagod, of a family which had been settled in Dublin since the twelfth century. The Bagods, later called Baggot or Bagot, gave their name to present-day Baggot Street. Here they built Baggotrath Castle, which for centuries was the strongest fortress in Dublin, but of which no trace survives. Robert succeeded to his father's estates in 1299. These included Dundrum, which he sold to Eustace le Poer (presumably the judge of that name, an itinerant justice in Dublin from the early 1290s) in 1310. Le Poer in turn sold Bagod lands in County Limerick; the elder Bagod had built a house in Limerick city c. 1270.

Sometime before 1303 Nicholas, Archbishop of Armagh assigned him £100 a year from the rents of Baltray, County Louth "in return for his good services". In 1307 Bagod successfully petitioned the Crown for restoration of the money, which had been taken back into the Crown's hands on the grounds that the Archbishop did not have the Crown's permission to assign it.

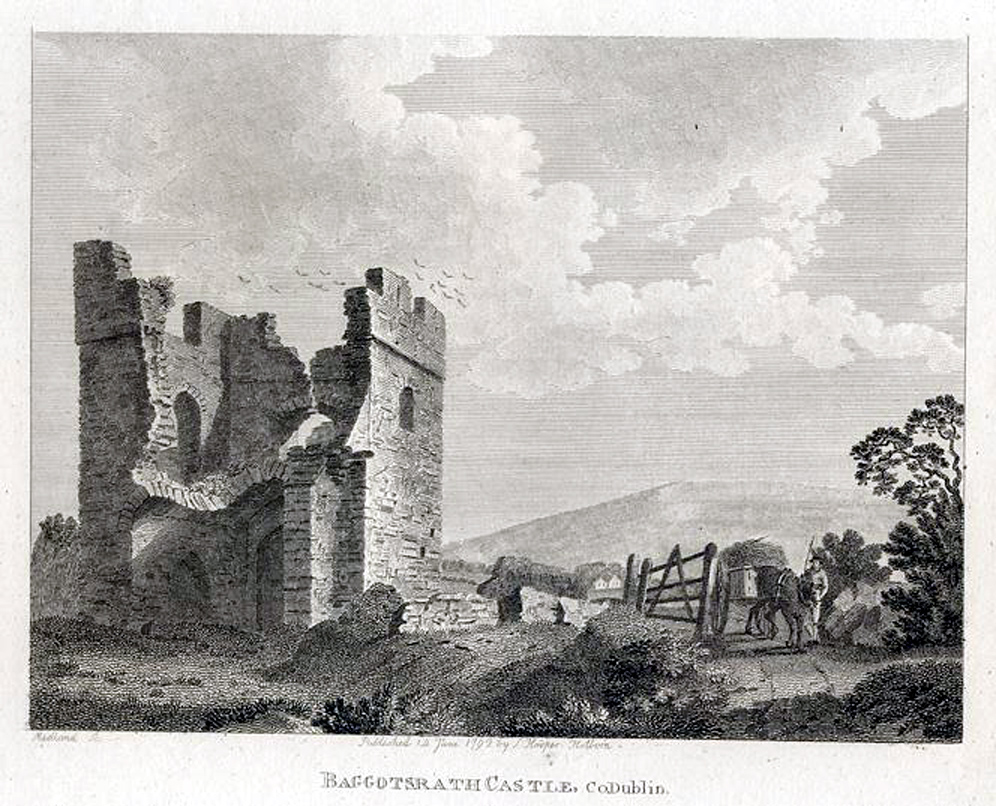
Ruins of Baggotrath Castle in 1792: no trace of it survives today

At first, he resolved on a clerical career, and advanced as far as a canon of St. Patrick's Cathedral, Dublin, but then decided to follow his father into the service of the English Crown. His career followed his father's closely: he served as High Sheriff of County Limerick 1302–3, was knighted around 1308 and became a justice of the Court of Common Pleas (Ireland) in 1307. In 1306 he was appointed one of the collectors of the tax of one-fifteenth (i.e. a tax assessed on one-fifteenth of the value of each taxpayer's movable goods). He was summoned for military service in Scotland by King Edward I in 1302 but apparently did not serve. In 1310 he was appointed a justice in eyre, for Dublin County only, along with Walter de Cusack, Hugh Canoun, David le Blond and others. In the same year he bought an estate in County Limerick from Eustace le Poer, in exchange for his estates at Dundrum. He rendered good service to the Crown during the Bruce campaign in Ireland in 1315, fighting mainly in Leinster. Some years later he sat on an important inquisition into claims by the citizens of Dublin that they had been impoverished during the Scots invasion. He was Bailiff (Sheriff) of Dublin in about 1308 and was Chief Serjeant of Limerick in 1317. He either resigned from the Bench or was forcibly retired in 1324, possibly in connection with a "clean sweep" of the Irish judiciary. In 1326 the Crown on his petition ordered the payment to him of the arrears of his salary. He died after 1329.

He married Avicia and they had at least four sons, Robert, Sylvester, Hervey and Thomas. The last two, like their father and grandfather, were High Court judges. Whether or not Sir William Bagod of Limerick, who died in 1358, was a member of this family is unclear. The name Bagod became strongly associated with Limerick.

== Sources ==
- Ball, F. Elrington The Judges in Ireland 1221-1921 London John Murray 1926
- Mackay, Ronan "Bagot (Bagod), Robert" Cambridge Dictionary of National Biography 2009
- Smyth, Constantine Joseph Chronicle of the Law Officers of Ireland London Butterworths 1839
