= 1954 Meath Senior Football Championship =

Meath S.F.C.
- Season: 1954
- Champions: Skryne; 7th Senior Championship Title
- Relegated: Dunshaughlin; Oldcastle; St. Patrick's
- Winning Captain: Tom O'Brien (Skryne)
- Matches: 13

The 1954 Meath Senior Football Championship is the 62nd edition of the Meath GAA's premier club Gaelic football tournament for senior graded teams in County Meath, Ireland. The tournament consists of 13 teams. The championship employs a group stage followed by a final between the group winners.

This season saw St. Vincent's debut in the top flight after claiming the 1953 Meath Intermediate Football Championship title. Summerhill also made their return to the grade after claiming the 1953 J.F.C. title.

Navan O'Mahonys were the defending champions after they defeated Trim in the previous years final to claim the first Keegan Cup, however they lost their crown by failing to progress past the group stages.

Skryne claimed their 7th S.F.C. title (and first Keegan Cup) by defeating Kells Harps in the final at Pairc Tailteann by 1-5 to 0-4 on 17 October 1954. Tom O'Brien raised the Keegan Cup for the Tara men.

At the end of the season Dunshaughlin, Oldcastle and St. Patrick's were regraded to the 1955 I.F.C.

== Team changes ==
The following teams have changed division since the 1953 championship season.

=== To S.F.C. ===
Promoted from 1953 I.F.C.

- St. Vincent's - (Intermediate Champions).

Promoted from 1953 J.F.C.

- Summerhill - (Junior Champions).

=== From S.F.C. ===
Regraded to 1954 I.F.C.

- Slane

=== Group A ===
Team	Pld	W	L	D	PF	PA	PD	Pts
Skryne	5	4	1	0	0	0	+0	8
St. Peter's Dunboyne	1	1	0	0	0	0	+0	2
Donaghmore	2	0	1	1	0	0	+0	1
St. Patrick's	1	0	1	1	0	0	+0	1
Summerhill	0	0	0	0	0	0	+0	0
St. Vincent's	1	0	1	0	0	0	+0	0
Dunshaughlin	1	0	1	0	0	0	+0	0

Round 1:

- St. Vincent's -vs- St. Patrick's, Duleek, 28/2/1954,
- Summerhill -vs- Dunshaughlin, Flathouse, 28/2/1954,
- Skryne 1-6, 1-2 Donaghmore, Ratoath, 14/3/1954,
- St. Peter's Dunboyne - Bye,

Round 2:

- St. Peter's Dunboyne -vs- Dunshaughlin, skryne, 14/3/1954,
- St. Vincent's -vs- Donaghmore, Skryne, 11/4/1954,
- Skryne w, l St. Patrick's, Ardcath, 23/5/1954,
- Summerhill - Bye,

Round 3:

- Summerhill -vs- St. Peter's Dunboyne, Dunshaughlin, 25/4/1954,
- Skryne 0-6, 0-0 St. Vincent's, Kilmoon, 6/6/1954,
- Donaghmore 2-6, 2-6 St. Patrick's, Duleek, 20/6/1954,
- Dunshaughlin - Bye,

Round 4:

- St. Peter's Dunboyne -vs- St. Patrick's, Ratoath, 4/7/1954,
- St. Vincent's -vs- Dunshaughlin, Ashbourne, 18/7/1954,
- Skryne -vs- Summerhill, Trim, 18/7/1954,
- Donaghmore - Bye,

Round 5:

- Donaghmore -vs- Dunshaughlin,
- St. Peter's Dunboyne -vs- St. Vincent's,
- Summerhill -vs- St. Patrick's,
- Skryne - Bye,

Round 6:

- Skryne +3, -3 Dunshaughlin, Warrenstown, 15/8/1954,
- St. Peter's Dunboyne -vs- Donaghmore,
- Summerhill -vs- St. Vincent's,
- St. Patrick's - Bye,

Round 7:

- St. Peter's Dunboyne w, l Skryne, Trim, 29/8/1954,
- Dunshaughlin -vs- St. Patrick's,
- Summerhill -vs- Donaghmore,
- St. Vincent's - Bye,

=== Group B ===
Team	Pld	W	L	D	PF	PA	PD	Pts
Kells Harps	5	5	0	0	0	0	+0	10
Syddan	4	3	1	0	0	0	+0	6
Navan O'Mahonys	4	2	2	0	0	0	+0	4
Ballivor	4	2	2	0	0	0	+0	4
Trim	3	0	3	0	0	0	+0	0
Oldcastle	4	0	4	0	0	0	+0	0

Round 1:

- Kells Harps 1-6, 0-2 Trim, Pairc Tailteann, 28/2/1954,
- Navan O'Mahonys 3-6, 2-1 Ballivor, Trim, 14/3/1954,
- Syddan 2-8, 0-1 Oldcastle, Kells, 14/3/1954,

Round 2:

- Ballivor w, l Oldcastle, Kilskyre, 25/4/1954,
- Syddan 2-4, 1-5 Trim, Pairc Tailteann, 6/6/1954,
- Kells Harps 3-3, 1-8 Navan O'Mahonys, Pairc Tailteann, 16/5/1954,

Round 3:

- Navan O'Mahonys 2-8, 1-1 Oldcastle, Kells, 6/6/1954,
- Kells Harps 0-6, 1-2 Syddan, Pairc Tailteann, 20/6/1954,
- Ballivor 1-4, 0-2 Trim, Pairc Tailteann, 18/7/1954,

Round 4:

- Kells Harps 3-9, 1-1 Ballivor, Pairc Tailteann, 8/8/1954,
- Syddan w/o, scr Navan O'Mahonys, Kells, 22/8/1954,
- Trim -vs- Oldcastle,

Round 5:

- Kells Harps w/o, scr Oldcastle, Pairc Tailteann, 22/8/1954,
- Trim -vs- Navan O'Mahonys,
- Syddan -vs- Ballivor,

== Final ==
- Skryne 1-5, 0-4 Kells Harps, Pairc Tailteann, 17/10/1954,
