= 1952 Meath Senior Football Championship =

Meath S.F.C.
- Season: 1952
- Champions: Syddan; 3rd Senior Championship Title
- Relegated: None

The 1952 Meath Senior Football Championship is the 60th edition of the Meath GAA's premier club Gaelic football tournament for senior graded teams in County Meath, Ireland. The tournament consists of 12 teams. The championship employs a group stage followed by a final between the group winners.

The championship had two divisional sides known as North Meath and South Meath, each composed of top players from Intermediate and Junior club players in their district.

- North Meath - (I.F.C. Club - Kilberry; J.F.C. Clubs - Castletown, Drumconrath, Grange Stars, Kilmainhamwood, Nobber, Rathbran, Shale Rovers).
- South Meath - (I.F.C. Club - Ballinabrackey; J.F.C. Clubs - Boardsmill, Clonard, Clonbun, Enfield, Garadice, Kildalkey, Killyon, Kiltale, Longwood, Rathmolyon, Summerhill).

This season saw St. Patrick's debut in the top flight (a little over a year since the establishment of the club in late 1950) after claiming the 1951 Meath Intermediate Football Championship title. Kells Harps also made their debut in the grade after claiming the 1951 J.F.C. title.

Syddan were the defending champions after they defeated Skryne in the previous year's final. They successfully defended their title to claim by defeating the same opposition in the final at Pairc Tailteann by 0-7 to 0-4 on 4 January 1953. This was the club's 3rd S.F.C. title overall. The attendance at the match was approximately 11,500.

At the end of the season no club was regraded to the 1953 I.F.C.

== Team changes ==
The following teams have changed division since the 1951 championship season.

=== To S.F.C. ===
Promoted from 1951 I.F.C.

- St. Patrick's - (Intermediate Champions).

Promoted from 1951 J.F.C.

- Kells Harps - (Junior Champions).

New Divisional Team:

- South Meath District

=== From S.F.C. ===
Regraded to 1952 I.F.C.

- None

== Group stage ==
There are 2 groups called Group A and B. The top finisher in each group qualifies for the Final. Many results were unavailable in the Meath Chronicle.

=== Group A ===
Team	Pld	W	L	D	PF	PA	PD	Pts
Skryne	3	3	0	0	0	0	+0	6
Donaghmore	1	0	1	0	0	0	+0	0
Dunshaughlin	1	0	1	0	0	0	+0	0
Trim	1	0	1	0	0	0	+0	0
St. Patrick's	0	0	0	0	0	0	+0	0
South Meath District	0	0	0	0	0	0	+0	0

Round 1:

- Skryne 2-7, 0-5 Trim, Pairc Tailteann, 17/8/1952,
- Dunshaughlin -vs- Donaghmore, Skryne, ???
- St. Patrick's -vs- South Meath,

Round 2:

- Donaghmore -vs- South Meath, Drumree, 22/5/1952,
- Skryne -vs- St. Patrick's,
- Dunshaughlin -vs- Trim,

Round 3:

- Donaghmore -vs- St. Patrick's, Skryne, 22/6/1952,
- Skryne w, l Dunshaughlin, Warrenstown, 21/12/1952,
- Trim -vs- South Meath,

Round 4:

- Skryne 1-6, 1-4 Donaghmore, Dunshaughlin, 14/12/1952,
- St. Patrick's -vs- Trim,
- South Meath -vs- Dunshaughlin,

Round 5:

- St. Patrick's -vs- Dunshaughlin, Ashbourne, 17/8/1952,
- Skryne -vs- South Meath,
- Donaghmore -vs- Trim,

=== Group B ===
Team	Pld	W	L	D	PF	PA	PD	Pts
Syddan	3	3	0	0	0	0	+0	6
Kells Harps	3	2	1	0	0	0	+0	4
Navan O'Mahonys	3	1	2	0	0	0	+0	2
Oldcastle	1	1	0	0	0	0	+0	2
Ballivor	3	0	3	0	0	0	+0	0
North Meath District	1	0	1	0	0	0	+0	0

Round 1:

- Navan O'Mahonys +3, -3 Ballivor, Trim, 27/4/1952,
- Kells Harps 3-3, 1-7 North Meath, Pairc Tailteann, 27/4/1952,
- Syddan -vs- Oldcastle,

Round 2:

- Syddan 3-5, 1-2 Navan O'Mahonys, Kells, 7/12/1952,
- Kells Harps -vs- Ballivor,
- Oldcastle -vs- North Meath,

Round 3:

- Oldcastle 2-12, 2-1 Ballivor, Kells, 20/7/1952,
- Kells Harps 2-5, 0-9 Navan O'Mahonys, Pairc Tailteann, 26/10/1952,
- Syddan -vs- North Meath, Rathkenny, 23/11/1952,

Round 4:

- Syddan 2-8, 0-2 Kells Harps, Pairc Tailteann, 14/9/1952,
- Navan O'Mahonys -vs- Oldcastle,
- Ballivor -vs- North Meath,

Round 5:

- Syddan 2-9, 0-2 Ballivor, Kells, 30/11/1952,
- Kells Harps -vs- Oldcastle, Kells, 7/12/1952,
- Navan O'Mahonys -vs- North Meath,

== Final ==
- Syddan 0-7, 0-4 Skryne, Pairc Tailteann, 4/1/1953,
