= 1953 Meath Senior Football Championship =

Meath S.F.C.
- Season: 1953
- Champions: Navan O'Mahonys; 1st Senior Championship Title
- Relegated: North Meath District (disbanded); Slane; South Meath District (disbanded)
- Winning Captain: Tony McCormack (Navan O'Mahonys)
- Matches: 13

The 1953 Meath Senior Football Championship is the 61st edition of the Meath GAA's premier club Gaelic football tournament for senior graded teams in County Meath, Ireland. The tournament consists of 12 teams. The championship employs a group stage followed by a final between the group winners.

This was the first season in which the Keegan Cup (presented by the Syddan club after the death of Tom Keegan in 1942) was presented to the S.F.C. champions.

The championship had two divisional sides known as North Meath and South Meath, each composed of top players from Intermediate and Junior club players in their district.

- North Meath - (I.F.C. Clubs - Castletown & Kilberry; J.F.C. Clubs - Drumconrath, Grange Stars, Kilmainhamwood, Nobber, Rathbran, Shale Rovers).
- South Meath - (I.F.C. Clubs - Ballinabrackey & Longwood; J.F.C. Clubs - Ballinabrackey 'B', Clonard, Clonbun, Enfield, Garadice, Kiltale, Rathmolyon, Summerhill).

This season saw St. Peter's Dunboyne's return to the top flight after claiming the 1952 Meath Intermediate Football Championship title. Slane also made their return to the grade after claiming the 1952 J.F.C. title.

Syddan were the defending champions after they defeated Skryne in the previous years final, however they lost their crown by failing to Navan O'Mahonys in a Final Play-Off.

Navan O'Mahonys claimed their first S.F.C. title by defeating Trim in the final at Pairc Tailteann by 3-7 to 2-4 on 13 September 1953. Tony McCormack had the honor of being the first man to raise the Keegan Cup.

At the end of the season Slane were regraded to the 1954 I.F.C. From 1954 onwards the North and South Meath districts discontinued their representation in the Meath S.F.C.

== Team changes ==
The following teams have changed division since the 1952 championship season.

=== To S.F.C. ===
Promoted from 1952 I.F.C.

- St. Peter's Dunboyne - (Intermediate Champions).

Promoted from 1952 J.F.C.

- Slane - (Junior Champions).

=== From S.F.C. ===
Regraded to 1953 I.F.C.

- None

== Group stage ==
There are two Groups called A and B. The two winners will proceed to the Final. Many results were unavailable in the Meath Chronicle.

=== Group A ===
Team	Pld	W	L	D	PF	PA	PD	Pts
Skryne	5	4	0	1	0	0	+0	9
Trim	5	4	0	1	0	0	+0	9
St. Patrick's	3	1	2	0	0	0	+0	2
Donaghmore	2	0	2	0	0	0	+0	0
St. Peter's Dunboyne	2	0	2	0	0	0	+0	0
Dunshaughlin	2	0	2	0	0	0	+0	0
South Meath District	0	0	0	0	0	0	+0	0

Round 1:

- St. Patrick's -vs- Donaghmore, Duleek, 8/3/1953,
- Skryne w, l St. Peter's Dunboyne, 29/3/1953,
- Trim w, l Dunshaughlin,
- South Meath - Bye,

Round 2:

- Trim w, l South Meath, Trim, 15/3/1953,
- Skryne w, l Donaghmore, Flathouse, 10/5/1953,
- St. Patrick's -vs- Dunshaughlin,
- St. Peter's Dunboyne - Bye,

Round 3:

- Trim w, l St. Patrick's, Skryne, 29/3/1953,
- St. Peter's Dunboyne -vs- Dunshaughlin,
- Skryne -vs- South Meath,
- Donaghmore - Bye,

Round 4:

- St. Patrick's w, l St. Peter's Dunboyne, Kilmoon, 17/5/1953,
- Skryne w, l Dunshaughlin, Dunshaughlin, 7/6/1953,
- Donaghmore -vs- South Meath,
- Trim - Bye,

Round 5:

- Trim w, l Donaghmore, Dunshaughlin, 7/6/1953,
- Skryne 2-6, 1-4 St. Patrick's, Duleek, 21/6/1953,
- St. Peter's Dunboyne -vs- South Meath,
- Dunshaughlin - Bye,

Round 6:

- Dunshaughlin -vs- Donaghmore, Dunshaughlin, 12/6/1953,
- Trim -vs- St. Peter's Dunboyne,
- St. Patrick's -vs- South Meath,
- St. Patrick's - Bye,

Round 7:

- Skryne 0-4, 0-4 Trim, Pairc Tailteann, 19/7/1953,
- Dunshaughlin -vs- South Meath,
- St. Peter's Dunboyne -vs- Donaghmore,
- St. Patrick's - Bye,

Final Play-Off:

- Trim 1-6, 0-9 Skryne, Pairc Tailteann, 16/8/1953,
- Trim 2-5, 0-9 Skryne, Pairc Tailteann, 30/8/1953, (Replay)

=== Group B ===
Team	Pld	W	L	D	PF	PA	PD	Pts
Navan O'Mahonys	5	4	1	0	0	0	+0	8
Syddan	5	4	1	0	0	0	+0	8
Kells Harps	4	2	1	1	0	0	+0	5
Ballivor	3	1	1	1	0	0	+0	3
Slane	4	1	3	0	0	0	+0	2
North Meath District	2	0	2	0	0	0	+0	0
Oldcastle	3	0	3	0	0	0	+0	0

Round 1:

- Kells Harps 0-7, 1-3 Slane, Pairc Tailteann, 1/3/1953,
- Navan O'Mahonys 4-9, 3-4 Oldcastle, Kells, 8/3/1953,
- Syddan 0-8, 0-5 Ballivor, Kells, 29/3/1953,
- North Meath - Bye,

Round 2:

- Kells Harps 1-4, 1-2 Navan O'Mahonys, 29/3/1953,
- North Meath -vs- Slane, Rathkenny, 29/3/1953,
- Syddan 2-5, 1-7 Oldcastle, Kells, 19/4/1953,
- Ballivor - Bye,

Round 3:

- Navan O'Mahonys 2-7, 0-6 North Meath, Rathkenny, 31/5/1953,
- Ballivor -vs- Slane,
- Kells Harps -vs- Oldcastle,
- Syddan - Bye,

Round 4:

- Kells Harps -vs- North Meath, Rathkenny, 17/5/1953,
- Syddan 0-15, 2-1 Slane, Rathkenny, 31/5/1953,
- Navan O'Mahonys -vs- Ballivor,
- Oldcastle - Bye,

Round 5:

- Navan O'Mahonys 2-4, 0-3 Syddan, Rathkenny, 17/5/1953,
- Kells Harps 1-3, 2-0 Ballivor, Pairc Tailteann, 7/6/1953,
- North Meath -vs- Oldcastle,
- Slane - Bye,

Round 6:

- Ballivor 3-4, 3-3 North Meath, Kells, 19/4/1953,
- Slane 1-8, 2-6 Oldcastle, Kells, 3/5/1953, *
- Syddan 0-8, 0-6 Kells Harps, Pairc Tailteann, 19/7/1953,
- Navan O'Mahonys - Bye,

Round 7:

- Navan O'Mahonys 1-12, 2-3 Slane, Beauparc, 21/6/1953,
- Ballivor -vs- Oldcastle,
- Syddan -vs- North Meath,
- Kells Harps - Bye,

Final Play-Off:

- Navan O'Mahonys 1-9, 1-8 Syddan, Kells, 23/8/1953,

- Although Oldcastle won the match against Slane on the day, the points were later awarded to the Louth border side due to the fact that Oldcastle fielded late and with only 14 men for the game, with the 15th man coming in for the 2nd half.

== Final ==
- Navan O'Mahonys 3-7, 2-4 Trim, Pairc Tailteann, 13/9/1953,
