= William of Bardfield =

English lawyer, judge in Ireland

William of Bardfield, William de Berdefeld or William de Bardesfeld (1258 – before 1334) was an English-born lawyer of the late thirteenth and early fourteenth century who enjoyed a successful legal career in England before moving to Ireland, where he was successively Serjeant-at-law (Ireland), justice of the Court of Common Pleas (Ireland), and justice of the Court of the Justiciar of Ireland.

He was dismissed from office in 1312; he was later reinstated, but was removed from office again in 1319 on the grounds of limited efficiency. The second dismissal was final, despite his vigorous pleas for reinstatement or compensation for loss of salary. He was a substantial landowner in both England and Ireland, though he complained that his Irish lands had been despoiled during the Scottish Invasion of 1315-1318.

== Early life ==
He was born in Great Bardfield, Essex, probably in 1258, the son of Walter of Bardfield. By 1379 he had begun practice an attorney, and he became a very successful one, practising in the Royal Courts at Westminster and on the Southern Circuit; he also had an official position in the English Exchequer between 1287 and 1292. By 1296 he had moved to Ireland, where his legal expertise quickly gained him admission to the highest ranks of the Irish legal profession (although, as it turned out, he was not highly regarded as a judge). He practised first as an attorney for private clients, and accumulated large retainers, both in cash and, oddly by modern standards, in robes.

== King's Serjeant ==
By 1297 he was one of the two King's Serjeants in Ireland (or King's Pleader, in the terminology of the time), Richard le Blond being the other. Their office involved pleading cases in the Royal Courts on behalf of the English Crown. He continued to take private clients, as most Serjeants then did. His retainer for his services to Nicholas, son of John de Interberge, survives, in which it was agreed that his services to Nicholas were subject to his duty to the King, and his prior commitments to longer established clients. (Nicholas was probably the Nicholas, son of John Hynterberge who sold The Rath, later called Baggotrath Castle, to the Bagod family in about 1280). For over a decade, William regularly appeared as an advocate on the Crown's behalf in the royal courts in Dublin, and also on the assizes in County Louth and County Cork. His salary was fixed at 5 marks per annum in 1299.

He appears to have been a conscientious Crown official. In 1302 he pleaded that one of the Royal demesnes had been sold without a licence, and in 1305 he pleaded that certain tenements has been sold "to the King's prejudice". In 1306 he sued over the misappropriation of certain weirs and fisheries which were Crown property. He was also guardian of the King's right to present priests to churches (the right of advowson), and sued several times to preserve the King's rights. It seems that his salary as King's Serjeant (fixed at 5 marks per annum in 1299) was in arrears until 1308.

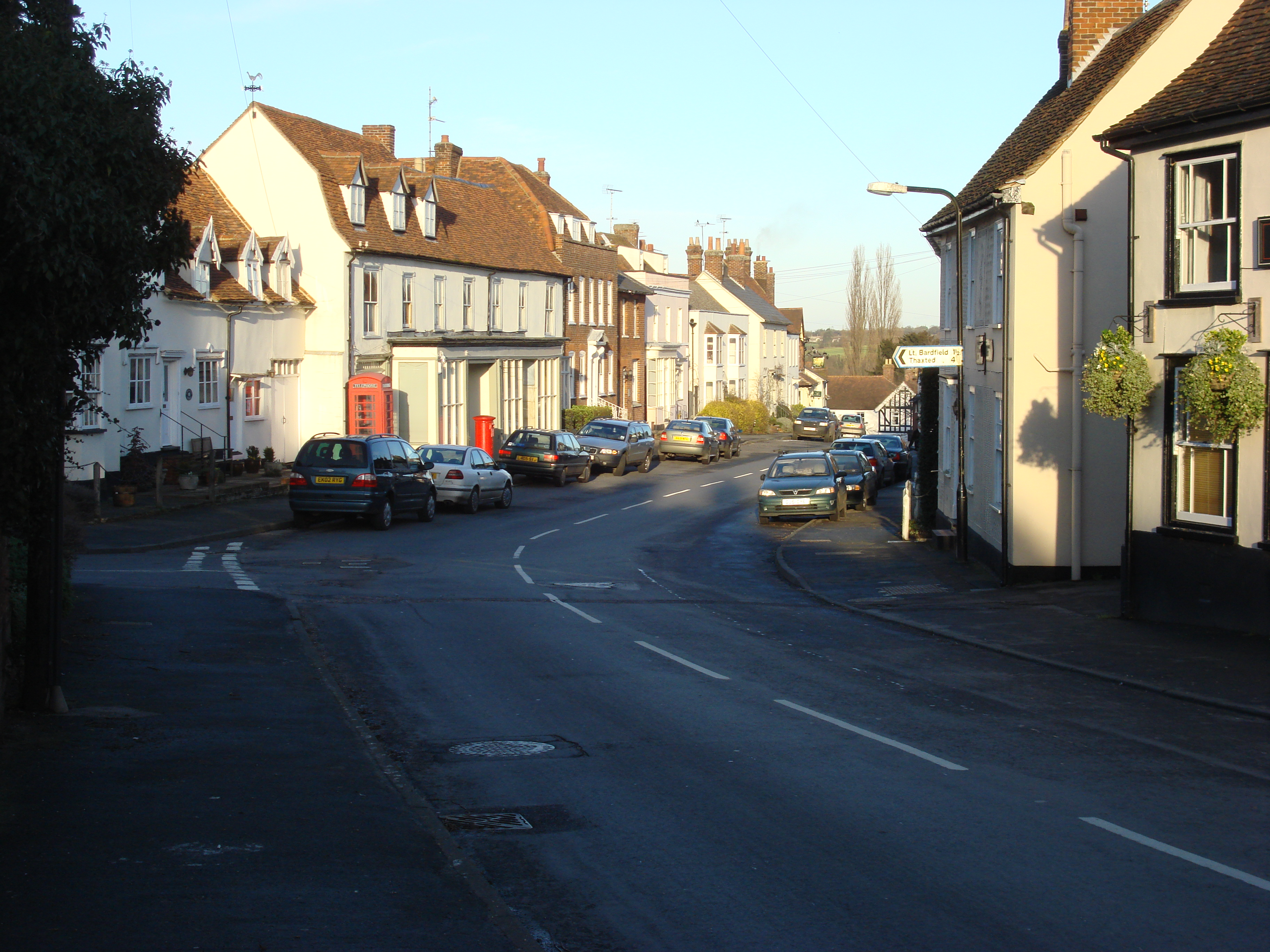
Great Bardfield, Essex, William's birthplace, present day: the High Street

== Judge ==
In 1308, following the death of John de Ponz, he was appointed puisne (junior) justice of the Common Pleas (which was then known simply as "the Bench"). He was removed from office in 1312, as part of an economy and efficiency drive. An order was issued by the Crown to the Irish Justiciar to dismiss all but the most efficient judges: Bardfield, despite his earlier high reputation as a lawyer, and his good services as Serjeant, was apparently considered expendable as a judge. In 1315 he was appointed to the Justiciar's Court, but evidently never sat there. He was reappointed to the Common Pleas shortly afterwards, to replace Hugh Canoun, but was finally dismissed from office in 1319.

== Petition for reinstatement ==
In 1321 he addressed a lengthy petition for redress to King Edward II of England and his Council. He referred to his long record of service to the Crown as Serjeant and judge, and pleaded for his reinstatement to the office, and also for compensation "so that he may have something to live on". He claimed redress under a number of heads, including the hardship he had suffered as a result of the loss of his salary on his dismissal, and the damage he had suffered to his property during the Scottish Invasion of Ireland in 1315-18. He also asked to be excused repayment of a Crown debt, on the grounds of his poverty. As far as we can judge he was entirely unsuccessful (he was probably suspected of exaggerating his poverty): the King's endorsement on the petition merely states that "he (the King) will do as he pleases". No doubt it was recalled that William had been removed from the Bench in 1312 as one of its least efficient members, and removed again in 1319 for the same reason. Given the extent of his lands, the Crown could be forgiven for being sceptical about his pleas of poverty. William was still alive in 1327, and probably died in early 1333.

== Family ==
He married c.1289 Katherine, co-heiress with her sister of John of Bayfield (died 1284), a wealthy clerk who had been attached to the Royal Courts at Westminster: the sisters were not Bayfield's daughters (he had no legitimate children), but were presumably his next of kin. William and Katherine had one son, also named William. By his marriage he acquired substantial lands in London, Middlesex and Norfolk. He also held lands in County Dublin, including an estate at Oxmantown, and his main residence at Collinstown, County Dublin. From his petition to the Crown for redress in 1321, it seems that his Irish lands suffered serious damage during the Bruce Campaign, although it is likely that he exaggerated the extent of his losses.

== Sources ==
- Ball, F. Elrington The Judges in Ireland 1221-1921 London John Murray 1926
- Brand, Paul "Bardfield, William of" Cambridge Dictionary of Irish Biography
- Casey, James The Irish Law Officers Round Hall Sweet and Maxwell 1996
- Hand, Geoffrey English Law in Ireland 1290-1324 Cambridge University Press 1967
- Hart, A.R. A History of the King's Serjeant at law in Ireland Dublin Four Courts Press 2000
- National Archives: Petition of William de Berdefeld 1321
