= Nicholas de Clere =

13th-century clergyman and Lord Treasurer of Ireland

Nicholas de Clere, or le Clerk (died 1303) was an English-born Crown administrator in the late thirteenth-century Ireland. He was a skilled financier who achieved high Government office, becoming Lord Treasurer of Ireland, but he faced serious charges of corruption, as a result of which he was removed from office. He was ruined financially by the huge debts he owed to the Crown, and spent his last years in prison.

== Career ==
Little is known of his origins or his family, except that he had a brother William, to whom he was close, and who acted as Deputy Treasurer. He seems to have first entered the royal service in 1277 as a clergyman attached to the royal chapel in Nottingham Castle. He came to Ireland a few years later and was appointed the custodian of the Archdiocese of Dublin, charged with its administration while the See was vacant in 1284.

In the same year, he was one of four commissioners chosen by King Edward I to investigate the state of the Exchequer of Ireland. Their report on the condition of the Irish finances was damning, and as a result, serious charges of corruption were brought against the Treasurer, Stephen de Fulbourn, Bishop of Waterford. Stephen was relieved of his official duties, but compensated by being consecrated Archbishop of Tuam in 1286. In 1285 Nicholas became Treasurer in his stead, with a salary of 100 shillings each quarter year. He and his brother William flourished: Nicholas became Archdeacon of Dublin, and was granted benefices in six dioceses.

== Charges of corruption ==
Within a few years, he was himself accused of corruption. Archbishop Fulbourn had died in 1288, but he still had powerful relatives, notably, his brother Walter de Fulburn, Bishop of Meath and Lord Chancellor of Ireland, and the Archbishop's family and supporters were probably responsible for the charges made against Nicholas. The charges were serious enough to be raised in the Parliament of England in the autumn of 1290, after a number of aggrieved citizens sent in petitions to Parliament. One such petition was from John Young, a ship-owner and merchant of Waterford, pleading that Nicholas had unlawfully seized his goods to the value of £200. William de Clifford, Bishop of Emly, was another of his accusers.

Hugh Tyrell, Baron of Castleknock, also complained of Nicholas's oppression, in that he was distraining Tyrell for failure to perform his feudal duties, which were the condition on which he held Castleknock as the King's tenant-in-chief when required; specifically to send three knights with horses and weapons to Dublin Castle. Tyrell pleaded that precisely the same complaint had been made by Stephen de Fulbourn, but a jury had acquitted him, and it was unlawful for Nicholas to proceed against him a second time.

Nicholas was removed as Treasurer in July 1291 and, following his removal, an official inquiry into his accounts began in the following December. Though he could produce satisfactory answers to many of the individual charges, the overall verdict, of corruption and gross mismanagement, was similar to his own judgment on Fulbourn: he was found to owe the Crown the enormous sum of £700. The inquiry also condemned the "low cunning of the man". He was judged to be guilty, and his lands and goods forfeited to the Crown.

== Downfall ==
In 1292 he was thrown into the Fleet Prison, where he remained for 6 years. He was finally released in order to find sureties for his huge debt to the King, and he returned to Dublin. He was not successful in finding guarantors for the debts, and in 1300 he was again imprisoned in Dublin Castle, where he spent his last years, though he may have been free for a brief time before his death in the summer of 1303.

His fate is in notable contrast to that of Sir Walter de la Haye, the former Chief Escheator of Ireland, who faced similar charges at the same time: Haye was triumphantly acquitted, assured of the King's good regard, and died peacefully in his bed.

== William de Clere ==
Nicholas' brother William was also briefly imprisoned at the behest of a prominent firm of Italian bankers, the Riccardi of Lucca, who were effectively the English Crown's financiers, and to whom he was heavily indebted (the firm failed soon afterwards when King Edward broke with them). In his last years William managed to salvage his reputation. In 1309 he was appointed Chancellor of the Exchequer of Ireland, but died almost at once.

== Sources ==
- Calendar of Documents relating to Ireland preserved in Her Majesty's Public Record Office 1271-1307
- Mackay, Ronan "Clere, Nicholas de" Cambridge Dictionary of Irish Biography
- Otway-Ruthven, A.J. History of Medieval Ireland Barnes and Noble reissue 1993
- Petitions to Parliament anno 18 Edward I
