= 1953 Meath Intermediate Football Championship =

Meath I.F.C.
- Season: 1953
- Champions: St. Vincent's; 1st Intermediate Football Championship title
- Relegated: Carnaross; Castletown; Donore; Kilberry; Longwood

The 1953 Meath Intermediate Football Championship was the 27th edition of the Meath GAA's premier club Gaelic football tournament for intermediate graded teams in County Meath, Ireland. The tournament consisted of 12 teams. The championship format consisted of a group stage before progressing to a knock-out stage.

No team was regraded from the 1952 S.F.C.

At the end of the season, Carnaross, Castletown, Donore, Kilberry and Longwood applied to be regraded to the 1954 J.F.C.

On 19 July 1953, St. Vincent's claimed their first Intermediate championship title when they defeated Dunderry 2-7 to 1-3 in the final at Pairc Tailteann.

== Team changes ==
The following teams changed division since the 1952 championship season.

=== From I.F.C. ===
Promoted to 1953 S.F.C.

- St. Peter's Dunboyne

Relegated to 1953 J.F.C.

- Syddan 'B'

=== To I.F.C. ===
Regraded from 1952 S.F.C.

- None

Promoted from 1952 J.F.C.

- Carnaross - (Junior Runners-Up & Kells District Champions)
- Donore - (Junior Semi-Finalists & East Divisional Champions)
- Longwood - (Junior Semi-Finalists & South Divisional Champions)
- Castletown - (Junior Quarter-Finalists & North Divisional Champions)
- Kilcloon - (East Divisional Runners-Up)

== Group stage ==
There were 2 groups called Group A and B. The top finisher in each group qualified for the final. Many results were unavailable in the Meath Chronicle.

=== Group A ===
| Team | Pld | W | L | D | PF | PA | PD | Pts |
|---|---|---|---|---|---|---|---|---|
| St. Vincent's | 3 | 3 | 0 | 0 | 0 | 0 | +0 | 6 |
| Duleek | 2 | 1 | 1 | 0 | 0 | 0 | +0 | 2 |
| Kilcloon | 2 | 0 | 2 | 0 | 0 | 0 | +0 | 0 |
| Donore | 1 | 0 | 1 | 0 | 0 | 0 | +0 | 0 |
| Kilberry | 0 | 0 | 0 | 0 | 0 | 0 | +0 | 0 |
| Castletown | 0 | 0 | 0 | 0 | 0 | 0 | +0 | 0 |

Round 1:

- Kilberry -vs- Donore, Slane, 8/3/1953,
- St. Vincent's 1-3, 0-4 Duleek, Stamullen, 22/3/1953,
- Kilcloon -vs- Castletown, Dunderry, 29/3/1953,

Round 2:

- Duleek -vs- Kilberry, Waltesrtown, 29/3/1953,
- St. Vincent's w, l Kilcloon, Flathouse, 10/5/1953,
- Castletown -vs- Donore,

Round 3:

- Duleek -vs- Donore, Donore, 19/4/1953,
- Kilcloon -vs- Kilberry,
- St. Vincent's -vs- Castletown,

Round 4:

- St. Vincent's -vs- Kilberry, Donore, 19/4/1953,
- Donore -vs- Kilcloon,
- Duleek -vs- Castletown,

Round 5:

- Duleek w, l Kilcloon, Kilmoon, 17/5/1953,
- St. Vincent's 2-5, 1-1 Donore, Stamullen, 31/5/1953,
- Kilberry -vs- Castletown,

=== Group B ===
| Team | Pld | W | L | D | PF | PA | PD | Pts |
|---|---|---|---|---|---|---|---|---|
| Dunderry | 3 | 3 | 0 | 0 | 0 | 0 | +0 | 6 |
| Ballinabrackey | 2 | 2 | 0 | 0 | 0 | 0 | +0 | 4 |
| Ballinlough | 3 | 1 | 1 | 1 | 0 | 0 | +0 | 3 |
| Carnaross | 4 | 1 | 2 | 1 | 0 | 0 | +0 | 3 |
| Longwood | 4 | 0 | 4 | 0 | 0 | 0 | +0 | 0 |

Round 1:

- Dunderry w/o, scr Longwood, Rathmolyon, 1/3/1953,
- Carnaross 1-6, 1-6 Ballinlough, Kells, 8/3/1953,
- Ballinabrackey - Bye,

Round 2:

- Ballinabrackey +1, -1 Carnaross, Ballivor, 22/3/1953, *
- Dunderry 1-3, 1-2 Ballinlough, Kilberry, 26/4/1953,
- Longwood - Bye,

Round 3:

- Dunderry -vs- Ballinabrackey,
- Ballinlough w/o, scr Longwood,
- Carnaross - Bye,

Round 4:

- Ballinlough -vs- Ballinabrackey, Dunderry, 19/4/1953,
- Carnaross w/o, scr Longwood,
- Dunderry - Bye,

Round 5:

- Dunderry 2-6, 2-5 Carnaross, Ballinlough, 7/6/1953,
- Ballinabrackey w/o, scr Longwood,
- Ballinlough - Bye,

- The match between Ballinabrackey and Carnaross was reported in the Meath Chronicle to have been abandoned (reason not reported) with Ballinabrackey winning by a point at that stage in the match. It's presumed Ballinabrackey were awarded the points.

== Final ==
- St. Vincent's 2-7, 1-3 Dunderry, Pairc Tailteann, 19/7/1953,
