= 1952 Meath Intermediate Football Championship =

Meath I.F.C.
- Season: 1952
- Champions: St. Peter's Dunboyne; 1st Intermediate Football Championship title
- Relegated: Syddan 'B'

The 1952 Meath Intermediate Football Championship was the 26th edition of the Meath GAA's premier club Gaelic football tournament for intermediate graded teams in County Meath, Ireland. The tournament consisted of 8 teams. The championship applied a league format.

No team was regraded from the 1951 S.F.C.

At the end of the season, Syddan 'B' applied to be regraded to the 1953 J.F.C.

St. Peter's Dunboyne claimed their 1st Intermediate championship title after finishing top of the table. Their triumph was sealed by the defeat of St. Vincent's 1-7 to 1-6 at Pairc Tailteann on 9 November 1952.

== Team changes ==
The following teams changed division since the 1951 championship season.

=== From I.F.C. ===
Promoted to 1952 S.F.C.

- St. Patrick's

Relegated to 1952 J.F.C.

- Drumree (folded; no team entered in Meath GAA competitions again until the 1957 J.F.C. South Division)
- Rathmolyon
- St. Mary's Kilbeg

=== To I.F.C. ===
Regraded from 1951 S.F.C.

- None

Promoted from 1951 J.F.C.

- Kilberry - (Junior Runners-Up & Navan District Champions)
- St. Peter's Dunboyne - (Junior Quarter-Finalists & Tara Divisional Champions)

== League table, fixtures and results ==
The club with the best record were declared I.F.C. champions. Many results were unavailable in the Meath Chronicle.

Team	Pld	W	L	D	PF	PA	PD	Pts
St. Peter's Dunboyne	4	4	0	0	0	0	+0	8
Dunderry	5	3	2	0	0	0	+0	6
St. Vincent's	3	2	1	0	0	0	+0	4
Ballinlough	3	2	1	0	0	0	+0	4
Kilberry	3	2	1	0	0	0	+0	4
Duleek	2	1	1	0	0	0	+0	2
Syddan 'B'	3	1	2	0	0	0	+0	2
Ballinabrackey	7	0	7	0	0	0	+0	0

Round 1:

- Duleek -vs- Syddan 'B', Slane, 6/4/1952,
- St. Peter's Dunboyne w, l Kilberry, Skryne, 27/4/1952,
- Dunderry -vs- Ballinlough, Athboy, 27/4/1952,
- St. Vincent's w, l Ballinabrackey,

Round 2:

- St. Vincent's -vs- Duleek, Donore, 1/6/1952
- Ballinlough 4-10, 0-1 Syddan 'B', Kells, 10/8/1952,
- Kilberry 3-5, 0-6 Dunderry, Pairc Tailteann, 9/11/1952,
- St. Peter's Dunboyne w/o, scr Ballinabrackey,

Round 3:

- Duleek w/o, scr Ballinabrackey,
- Ballinlough -vs- St. Vincent's,
- St. Peter's Dunboyne -vs- Dunderry,
- Kilberry -vs- Syddan 'B',

Round 4:

- St. Vincent's -vs- Kilberry, Seneschalstown, 8/6/1952,
- Dunderry w/o, scr Ballinabrackey,
- St. Peter's Dunboyne -vs- Syddan 'B',
- Duleek -vs- Ballinlough,

Round 5:

- Kilberry -vs- Duleek, Seneschalstown, 22/6/1952,
- Dunderry 1-8, 0-6 Syddan 'B', Pairc Tailteann, 24/8/1952,
- St. Peter's Dunboyne 1-7, 1-6 St. Vincent's, Pairc Tailteann, 9/11/1952,
- Ballinlough w/o, scr Ballinabrackey,

Round 6:

- St. Vincent's 0-12, 1-6 Dunderry, Pairc Tailteann, 22/6/1952,
- Ballinlough -vs- Kilberry, Kells, 19/10/1952,
- St. Peter's Dunboyne -vs- Duleek, Kilmessan, 26/10/1952,
- Syddan 'B' w/o, scr Ballinabrackey,

Round 7:

- Dunderry 2-2, 1-4 Duleek, Pairc Tailteann, 8/6/1952,
- St. Peter's Dunboyne 1-8, 0-7 Ballinlough, Pairc Tailteann, 14/9/1952,
- St. Vincent's -vs- Syddan 'B', Seneschalstown, 26/10/1952,
- Kilberry w/o, scr Ballinabrackey,
