= Joseph O'Leary (journalist) =

Irish journalist and songwriter (c. 1795–1845)

Joseph O'Leary (c. 1795 – 1845) was an Irish journalist and songwriter.

== Life and career ==
O'Leary was born in Cork in about 1795. In his youth he joined a company of strolling players, but his theatrical experience was short, as the manager was insolvent.

About 1818 he commenced to write for the Cork papers — notably, the Freeholder, a scurrilous sheet which was edited by John Boyle, and lasted till 1842. O'Leary's contributions were considered very powerful, and it was in its columns his Bacchanalian song, 'Whiskey, drink divine,' appeared. About 1818 he also wrote for the Bagatelle, a short-lived Cork periodical; and for a time he edited the Cork Mercantile Reporter.

Between 1825 and 1828 he contributed to Bolster's Cork Quarterly, and to two London periodicals, the Dublin and London Magazine and Captain Rock in London. The biographer Richard Ryan, who seems to have known him, says in his Poets and Poetry (1826), that he was, in 1826, preparing a translation of Tibullus. In 1830 O'Leary published a pamphlet On the Late Election in Cork, under the signature of A Reporter. There are also some poems by him in Patrick O'Kelly's Hippocrene (1831); and in 1833 a small collection of his poems and sketches appeared at Cork in an anonymous volume, entitled The Tribute.

In 1834 he came to London and joined the staff of the Morning Herald as parliamentary reporter. He seems to have met with little success in London, and drowned himself in the Regent's Canal about 1845.

== Attribution ==
- This article incorporates text from a publication now in the public domain: "O'Leary, Joseph". Dictionary of National Biography. London: Smith, Elder & Co. 1885–1900.
