= 1950 Meath Intermediate Football Championship =

Meath I.F.C.
- Season: 1950
- Champions: Donaghmore; 2nd Intermediate Football Championship title
- Relegated: Cushinstown Young Ireland's (folded); Moynalty

The 1950 Meath Intermediate Football Championship is the 24th edition of the Meath GAA's premier club Gaelic football tournament for intermediate graded teams in County Meath, Ireland. The tournament consists of 10 teams. The championship starts with a group stage and then progresses to a final.

Ardcath, Dunderry and St. Mary's Kilbeg were relegated from the 1949 S.F.C.

This was the final season that Ardcath was named as such. From the 1951 I.F.C. onwards they were known as St. Vincent's.

At the end of the season, the Cushinstown Young Ireland's club (an amalgamation of the Cushinstown and Bellewstown clubs in 1947) folded. No Cushinstown club has been reformed, however a new club Bellewstown St. Theresa's was established in the J.F.C. in the mid-1960s. Moynalty applied to be regraded to the 1951 J.F.C.

On 10 September 1950, Donaghmore claimed their 2nd Intermediate championship title when they defeated Ballinabrackey 2–9 to 0–5 in the final.

== Team changes ==
The following teams have changed division since the 1950 championship season.

=== From I.F.C. ===
Promoted to 1950 S.F.C.

- Trim - (Intermediate Champions)

Relegated to 1950 J.F.C.

- None

=== To I.F.C. ===
Regraded from 1949 S.F.C.

- Ardcath
- Dunderry

Promoted from 1949 J.F.C.

- None

== Group stage ==
There are 2 groups called Division A and B, made on a regional basis. The top finishers in Group A and B qualified for the final.

=== Division A ===
| Team | Pld | W | L | D | Pts |
|---|---|---|---|---|---|
| Donaghmore | 2** | 2 | 0 | 0 | 4 |
| Duleek | 3* | 2 | 1 | 0 | 4 |
| Cushinstown Young Ireland's | 2** | 0 | 2 | 0 | 0 |
| Drumree | 1*** | 0 | 1 | 0 | 0 |
| Ardcath | 0 | 0 | 0 | 0 | 0 |

Round 1:

- Young Ireland's -vs- Ardcath, Cushinstown, 12/3/1950,
- Donaghmore -vs- Drumree, Cushinstown, 12/3/1950,
- Duleek - Bye,

Round 2:

- Duleek 3-6, 1-4 Young Ireland's, Duleek, 26/3/1950,
- Donaghmore -vs- Ardcath,
- Drumree - Bye,

Round 3:

- Donaghmore w, l Young Ireland's, Duleek, 21/5/1950,
- Duleek w, l Drumree, Donaghmore, 7/5/1950,
- Ardcath - Bye,

Round 4:

- Duleek -vs- Ardcath,
- Young Ireland's -vs- Drumree,
- Donaghmore - Bye,

Round 5:

- Donaghmore w, l Duleek,
- Ardcath -vs- Drumree,
- Young Ireland's - Bye,

=== Division B ===
| Team | Pld | W | L | D | Pts |
|---|---|---|---|---|---|
| Ballinabrackey | 1*** | 1 | 0 | 0 | 2 |
| Ballinlough | 3* | 2 | 1 | 0 | 4 |
| Moynalty | 2** | 0 | 2 | 0 | 0 |
| Rathmolyon | 2** | 1 | 1 | 0 | 2 |
| Dunderry | 2** | 1 | 1 | 0 | 2 |

Round 1:

- Ballinabrackey -vs- Ballinlough, Ballivor, 12/3/1950,
- Rathmolyon 3-4, 2-4 Moynalty, Trim, 26/3/1950,
- Dunderry - Bye,

Round 2:

- Ballinabrackey -vs- Rathmolyon, Clonard, 30/4/1950,
- Dunderry -vs- Moynalty,
- Ballinlough - Bye,

Round 3:

- Ballinlough 1-4, 0-6 Moynalty, Kilskyre, 21/5/1950,
- Dunderry -vs- Rathmolyon,
- Ballinabrackey - Bye,

Round 4:

- Dunderry 2-5, 2-1 Ballinlough, Kells, 9/7/1950,
- Ballinabrackey -vs- Moynalty,
- Rathmolyon - Bye,

Round 5:

- Ballinabrackey w, l Dunderry, Trim, 30/7/1950,
- Ballinlough 1-8, 1-7 Rathmolyon, Trim, 30/7/1950,
- Moynalty - Bye,

== Final ==
10 September 1950
Final

| Donaghmore | 2-9 - 0-5 | Ballinabrackey |

Pairc Tailteann
