= 1951 Meath Senior Football Championship =

Meath S.F.C.
- Season: 1951
- Champions: Syddan; 2nd Senior Championship Title
- Relegated: None

The 1951 Meath Senior Football Championship is the 59th edition of the Meath GAA's premier club Gaelic football tournament for senior graded teams in County Meath, Ireland. The tournament consists of 9 teams. The championship applied a league format.

The championship had one divisional side known as North Meath, composed of top players from Intermediate and Junior club players in the district.

- North Meath - (I.F.C. Club - St. Mary's Kilbeg; J.F.C. Clubs - Castletown, Drumconrath, Kilmainhamwood, Nobber, Rathbran, Shale Rovers).

This season saw Donaghmore's debut to the top flight after claiming the 1950 Meath Intermediate Football Championship title. Dunshaughlin also made their debut in the grade after claiming the 1950 J.F.C. title.

North Meath were the defending champions after they defeated Skryne in the previous year's final, however this season they failed to make it past they failed to defend their title.

Syddan claimed their 2nd S.F.C. title after finishing top of the table and winning the subsequent final. Their triumph was sealed by the defeat of Skryne on 1 June 1952 by 3–5 to 0–9 in Pairc Tailteann.

At the end of the season no club was regraded to the 1952 I.F.C.

== Team changes ==
The following teams have changed division since the 1950 championship season.

=== To S.F.C. ===
Promoted from 1950 I.F.C.

- Donaghmore - (Intermediate Champions).

Promoted from 1950 J.F.C.

- Dunshaughlin - (Junior Champions).

=== From S.F.C. ===
Regraded to 1951 I.F.C.

- St. Mary's Kilbeg

== League Table & Fixtures/Results ==
The two clubs with the best record enter the S.F.C. Final. Many results were unavailable in the Meath Chronicle.

Team	Pld	W	L	D	PF	PA	PD	Pts
Syddan	3	3	0	0	0	0	+0	6
Skryne	2	1	1	0	0	0	+0	2
Dunshaughlin	2	2	0	0	0	0	+0	4
Navan O'Mahonys	3	2	1	0	0	0	+0	4
North Meath	3	1	2	0	0	0	+0	2
Ballivor	3	0	1	2	0	0	+0	2
Donaghmore	1	0	0	1	0	0	+0	1
Trim	2	0	1	1	0	0	+0	1
Oldcastle	3	0	3	0	0	0	+0	0

Round 1:

- Syddan 4-5, 1-6 Navan O'Mahonys, Kells, 18/3/1951,
- North Meath 2-6, 1-3 Oldcastle, Kells, 18/3/1951,
- Donaghmore d, d Ballivor, Drumree, 18/3/1951,
- Skryne -vs- Trim, Drumree, 18/3/1951,
- Dunshaughlin - Bye,

Round 2:

- Dunshaughlin w, l Trim, Skryne, 2/3/1952 ***
- Skryne -vs- Navan O'Mahonys,
- Syddan -vs- Donaghmore,
- North Meath -vs- Ballivor
- Oldcastle - Bye,

Round 3:

- Navan O'Mahonys -vs- Dunshaughlin,
- Skryne -vs- Donaghmore,
- Syddan -vs- Ballivor,
- Trim -vs- Oldcastle,
- North Meath - Bye,

Round 4:

- Navan O'Mahonys 0-6, 1-1 Oldcastle, Kells, 25/11/1951,
- North Meath -vs- Trim,
- Dunshaughlin -vs- Donaghmore
- Skryne -vs- Syddan,
- Ballivor - Bye,

Round 5:

- Navan O'Mahonys 3-9, 1-6 North Meath, Kells, 26/8/1951
- Skryne 3-5, 2-5 Ballivor, Trim, 23/3/1952,
- Syddan -vs- Dunshaughlin,
- Donaghmore -vs- Oldcastle
- Trim - Bye,

Round 6:

- Syddan 2-7, 1-5 Oldcastle, Kells, 26/8/1951,
- Dunshaughlin +1, -1 Skryne, Ashbourne, 26/8/1951,
- Trim 2–4, 2-4 Ballivor, Kells, 23/12/1951,
- North Meath -vs- Donaghmore,
- Navan O'Mahonys - Bye,

Round 7:

- Syddan 2-4, 2-2 North Meath, Kells, 25/4/1951,
- Dunshaughlin -vs- Ballivor, Trim, 24/6/1951,
- Skryne -vs- Oldcastle,
- Navan O'Mahonys -vs- Trim,
- Donaghmore - Bye,

Round 8:

- Navan O'Mahonys -vs- Ballivor,
- Skryne -vs- North Meath,
- Donaghmore -vs- Trim,
- Dunshaughlin -vs- Oldcastle,
- Syddan - Bye,

Round 9:

- Navan O'Mahonys -vs- Donaghmore,
- Dunshaughlin -vs- North Meath,
- Ballivor -vs- Oldcastle,
- Syddan -vs- Trim,
- Skryne - Bye,

Final Play-Off:

- Skryne 1-11, 0-6 Dunshaughlin, Skryne, 27/4/1952,

== Final ==
- Syddan 3-5, 0-9 Skryne, Pairc Tailteann, 1/6/1952.
