= Richard le Blond =

Irish lawyer and judge of the early fourteenth century

Richard le Blond (or le Blound; died after 1325) was an Irish lawyer and judge of the early fourteenth century. After serving for many years as Serjeant-at-law (Ireland) he was rewarded for his services to the English Crown with a seat on the Court of Common Pleas (Ireland).

He was born in Arklow, County Wicklow. It is unclear whether or not he was related to David le Blond, or le Blound, who was a justice of the Court of the Justiciar of Ireland during the same era; (there is some evidence that David came from County Cork, not Wicklow).

Richard was appointed King's Serjeant, as the office of Serjeant-at-law was then known, in 1297, jointly with William of Bardfield. There is a reference to him as the King's "Serjeant Pleader", an early use of the term serjeant. He appears to have been diligent in arguing cases on behalf of the English Crown: in 1301 he appeared for the Crown at the assizes in County Louth and in the same year he was acting for the Crown in each of the Royal Courts in Dublin. We have records of at least two of the cases he pleaded. The first, in 1301-2, concerned legal issues of some importance on the powers of the Exchequer of Ireland. In the second case, in 1305, he sued on behalf of King Edward I for the recovery of certain lands which belonged to him.

The official records show that he was highly regarded by the Crown. When he petitioned for custody of the lands of Thomas Bodenham, lately deceased, which had now vested in the Crown, and the guardianship and right of marriage of his heir, his petition was granted: "the more quickly because the King acquired the lands at Richard's suit, and because he has acted in a praiseworthy fashion in the King's business as his Serjeant pleader".

In 1309 he made the first of several official complaints about the maladministration of Geoffrey de Morton, a corrupt and unpopular local government official and former Mayor of Dublin. An inquiry was held into the allegations, but it ended inconclusively (a later inquiry upheld all the allegations of corruption against Morton).

After a quarter of a century's service as Serjeant, le Blond was appointed to the Common Pleas in 1322. He was also appointed justice itinerant for County Meath. He seems to have retired in 1325. He has been described as a man who was "greatly knowledgeable in the law", and one "who gave the King praiseworthy service".

== Sources ==
- Ball, F. Elrington The Judges in Ireland 1221-1921 John Murray London 1926 Volume 1
- Casey, James The Irish Law Officers Round Hall Sweet and Maxwell 1996
- Hand, Geoffrey English Law in Ireland 1290-1324 Cambridge University Press 1967
- Hart, A. R. A History of the King's Serjeants at law in Ireland Four Courts Press Dublin 2000
