= Nicholas Cusack =

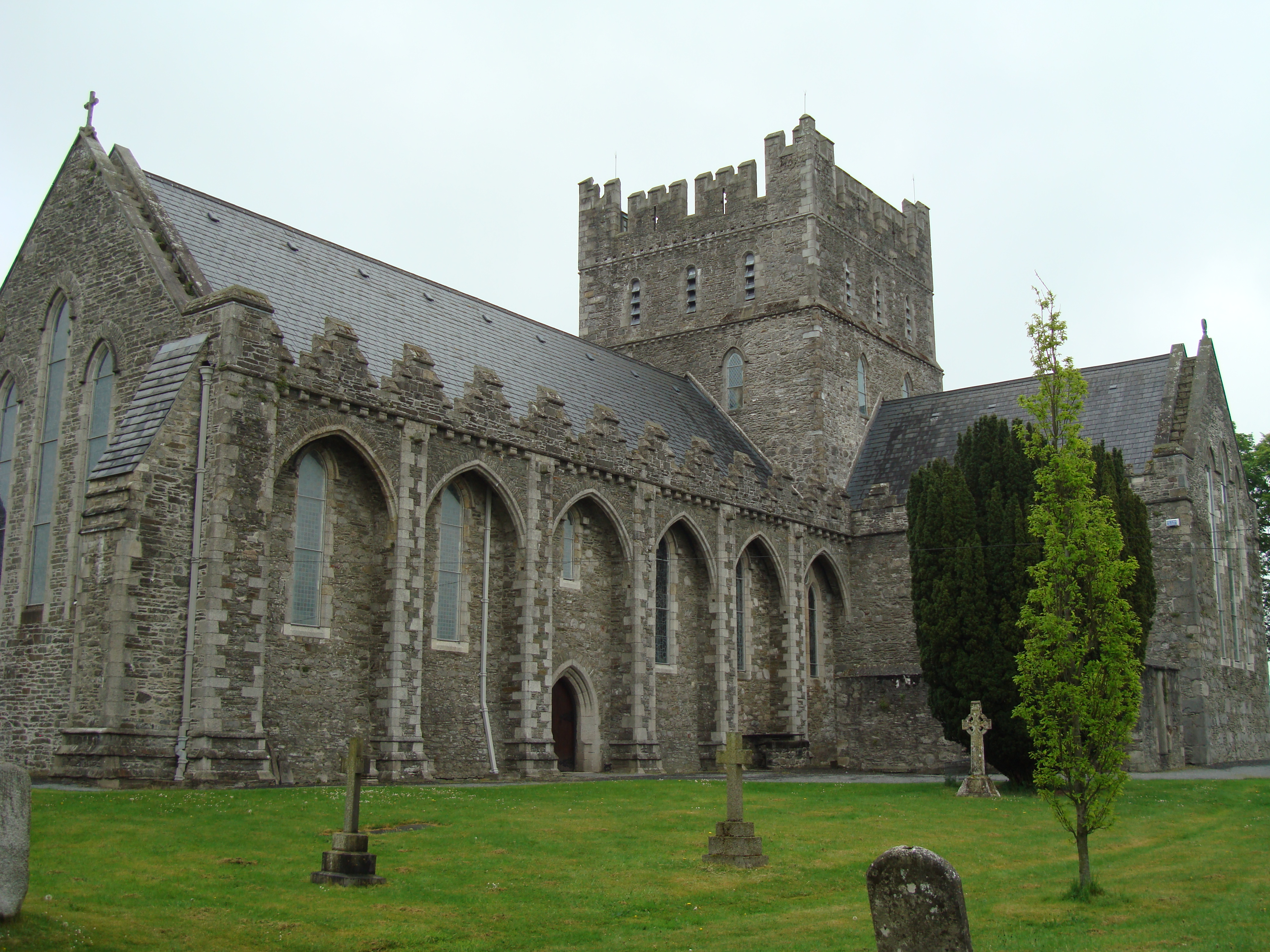
Kildare Cathedral

Nicholas Cusack (died 5 September 1299) was a thirteenth-century Bishop of Kildare and member of the Franciscan Order.

He belonged to a prominent Anglo-Irish family from County Meath, who were tenants-in-chief to Baron Skryne, and were later based mainly at Cushinstown, County Meath. Walter de Cusack of Gerrardstown (died 1334), the leading judge and military commander, was a cousin. Nicholas clearly regarded himself as an Englishman, and he was always hostile to the Gaelic Irish.

After the death of Bishop Simon of Kilkenny in 1272, divisions in the Chapter led to a seven-year vacancy in the See of Kildare, the Chapter being split over the rival claims of the Dean of Kildare and the Treasurer. Finally, Nicholas was chosen as Bishop in November 1279. Being conveniently in England, where he enjoyed an extended stay, he petitioned King Edward I of England to grant him the temporalities of the See.

As bishop, he is chiefly remembered for his warning to the King in 1284/5 of the disloyalty of Irish monks, to whom he was deeply hostile. He warned that the monks were meeting with the native Irish rulers in secret and assuring them that it was a lawful and Godly act to attack the English colony.

In 1291, he was involved in controversy, when a number of other bishops presented a list of grievances to the King about his taxation demands. The following year he and the Bishop of Meath, Thomas St Leger, were chosen to collect the papal tax granted by Pope Nicholas III to the King for the relief of the Holy Land.

In his last years, he clashed several times with William de Vesci (d. 1297), the Justiciar of Ireland, and his subordinate official Thomas Darcy, Seneschal of Kildare. The clashes were over the extent of William's private rights and privileges as Lord of the liberty of County Kildare, which he had inherited from his mother, Agnes de Ferrers, who was one of the Marshal co-heiresses. These disputes do not seem to have been related to the numerous complaints about William's maladministration as Justiciar, which led to his removal in 1294.

Nicholas died on 5 September 1299 and was buried in Kildare Cathedral.
