= James MacGeoghegan =

Irish Roman Catholic priest and historian

James MacGeoghegan (1702-1763) was an Irish Roman Catholic priest and historian.

== Life ==
MacGeoghan was born in Westmeath near Uisneach in 1702. His father was a moderately wealthy farmer, belonging to the same prominent Geoghegan family as figures such as Richard MacGeoghegan (defended Dunboy Castle against George Carew, 1st Earl of Totnes), Connell MacGeoghegan (translated the Annals of Clonmacnoise), and Francis O'Molloy (author of the Lucerna Fidelium).

The young MacGeoghegan was sent to France for his education, studying philosophy and theology in Rheims, winning academic honours in the latter. After being ordained a priest, MacGeoghan became the vicar of the parish of Possy, in the Diocese of Chartres, where he served for five years. While there, he continued his studies at the Lombard College (later the Irish College, Paris), where he earned his M.A. in 1733.

In 1734, MacGeoghegan was elected one of the provisors of the Lombard College, although the election was shortly suspended and MacGeoghegan was removed due to conflict within the college. He was then assigned to the Hôtel-Dieu de Paris, where he served briefly before becoming the personal chaplain, first to an English man, then to one Madame de Bignon. The latter, likely a relative of Jean-Paul Bignon and Armand-Jérôme Bignon, may have been a valuable source of access to the royal library for MacGeoghegan. He was also for some time chaplain to the Irish Brigade in the service of France, and later was attached to the Church of Saint-Merri in Paris, where he died of a fever in 1764.

== Works ==
He wrote a History of Ireland in French, published in Paris in 1758. It was dedicated by the author to the Irish Brigade, and claims that during the fifty years following the Treaty of Limerick (1691) no fewer than 450,000 Irish soldiers died in the service of France. MacGeoghegan was shut out from access to the manuscript materials of history in Ireland, and had to rely chiefly on John Lynch and John Colgan. John Mitchel's 1869 History of Ireland professes to be merely a continuation of MacGeoghegan, though Mitchel is throughout much more of a partisan than MacGeoghegan.

== Bibliography ==
- J. M. G. (1730). Oeuvres mêlées en Latin, Anglois et François sur divers sujets en prose et vers (in Latin, French, and English). Hamburg: Wolters, Conrad König. OCLC 80280763.
- Ma-Geoghegan [sic], M. l'abbé [James] (1758). Tome Premier. Histoire de l'Irlande ancienne et moderne (in French). Paris: Antoine Boudet.
- Mac-Geoghegan, M. l'abbé [James] (1762). Tome Second. Histoire de l'Irlande ancienne et moderne (in French). Paris: Antoine Boudet.
- Mac-Geoghegan, M. l'abbé [James] (1763). Tome Troisieme. Histoire de l'Irlande ancienne et moderne (in French). Amsterdam.
- Mac-Geoghegan, Abbé [James] (1844) [1831–1832]. The History of Ireland, Ancient and Modern: Taken from the Most Authentic Records, and Dedicated to the Irish Brigade. Translated by O'Kelly, Patrick (corrected ed.). Dublin: J. Duffy.
