= Walter de la Haye =

English official in Ireland

Sir Walter de la Haye or de Haye (died after 1309) was an English-born statesman and judge in Ireland of the late thirteenth and early fourteenth centuries, who served for many years as Sheriff of County Waterford and as Chief Escheator of Ireland, and briefly as Justiciar of Ireland.

He was a man of great ambition, with a passion for acquiring land, but he was also a conscientious official who was held in high regard by the English Crown, which protected him from accusations of corruption. He was also accused of unduly high-handed behaviour as Escheator, in particular taking property into the King's hands for insufficient cause. He became a substantial landowner in two Irish counties. He had children, but his descendants seem to have died out within a couple of generations.

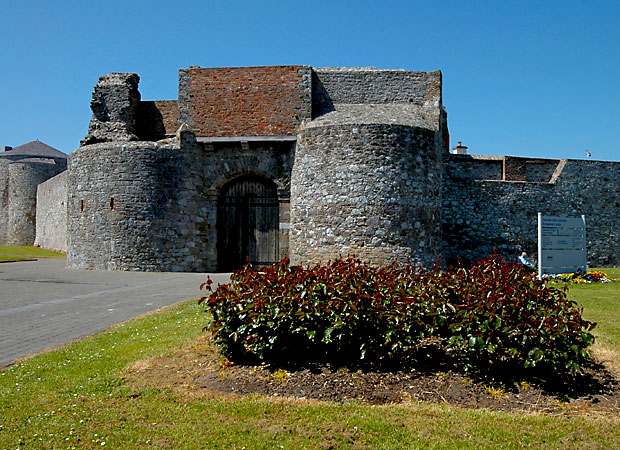
Dungarvan Castle: de la Haye was Constable of the castle in the 1270s

== Early career ==
He first appeared in Ireland in 1271–2 as an attorney, who acted for one of the justices of the English Royal Courts, and was later appointed custodian of the Archdiocese of Dublin. The whole of his career was spent in Ireland.

He became High Sheriff of County Waterford in 1272 and served in that office until 1284, receiving several official commendations for his diligence in performing his duties, He was knighted in 1281 or 1282. He was invited to attend the coronation of King Edward I in 1274. He became Constable of Dungarvan Castle in County Waterford and also Constable of King John's Castle, Limerick. He became a landed proprietor in Ireland: he was granted the manor and castle of Kilmeadan, County Waterford by the Justiciar of Ireland, Robert d'Ufford, in 1285. He was made custodian of the city of Waterford, in return for an annual payment to the Crown. He also acquired an estate at Knocktopher, County Kilkenny, in the early 1290s, through marriage to the widowed Alice Le Bret.

He became Chief Escheator of Ireland in 1285, with special authority to negotiate with the Gaelic clans within his bailiwick. He also had more mundane tasks, such as the inquisition he held at New Ross in 1292 into the hotly disputed question of the ownership of a cargo of wine on the merchant ship The Alice of Harwich. He was clearly diligent in performing his role as Escheator, if somewhat slow: at least two cases he dealt with were still at hearing in 1307, only a few years before his death. As Escheator, though rarely accused of corruption, he was accused of acting in ignorance of the truth, as in the la Rochelle case, and of being too willing to take lands into the King's hands, without regard to the rights of others.

== Charged with corruption ==
His possession of substantial landed estates in Counties Waterford and Kilkenny, and his increasingly central role in Government, led to a clash with the le Poer family, whose power in the south-east of Ireland was growing steadily. The conflict led him to arrest and imprison the principal troublemaker of the family, Robert le Poer, on an unspecified charge. It may well have been the le Poers, aided by the Bishop of Emly, William de Clifford, who brought charges of corruption and "oppression" (the latter was a rather vague concept) against Haye in connection with his office of Escheator. The charges principally turned on his alleged harsh treatment of Crown tenants, whom he was accused of crippling financially with exorbitant rents. These were linked to similar but more credible charges against the Treasurer of Ireland, Nicholas de Clere (or Nicholas le Clerk) and his brother William, who had also quarrelled with Bishop de Clifford.

Haye went to England in 1290 to answer the charges against him and was completely exonerated. King Edward made clear his high regard for Haye, and his belief that as Escheator he had acted in the best interests of the Crown, especially in the matter of Crown rents. Edward did tactfully suggest that Haye should spend less time sending lengthy and time-consuming reports about Irish affairs back to England.

The unfortunate Nicholas de Clere, on the other hand, was arrested on similar charges of corruption, and spent his last years in prison, having failed to have proven his innocence to the King's satisfaction, and unable to pay off his massive debts to the Crown. De Clere's brother William was also imprisoned briefly, but later restored to royal favour.

Haye, despite his high standing at Court, made the familiar complaint of civil servants in that era that his salary was constantly in arrears. He also complained about the difficulty in compiling his accounts.

== Justiciar ==
He acted as an itinerant justice regularly from 1278 onwards, principally in County Dublin and also in County Tipperary, and was a justice of the Court of the Justiciar from 1294 to 1298. In 1293 he sat on a commission to inquire into allegations of wrongdoing against the Justiciar, William de Vesci, and presided at the crucial meeting of the Privy Council of Ireland where John FitzGerald, 1st Earl of Kildare, made accusations of maladministration against de Vesci, which were considered serious enough to be referred to Westminster, along with the commission's own report.

He was appointed Justiciar in 1294 following de Vesci's removal, on the recommendation of Sir William de Essendon, the Lord High Treasurer of Ireland, and two other senior officials, and he was acting Justiciar in 1295–6, but was described as "locum tenens", an indication that this was a temporary appointment. In 1296 he was described in the Patent Roll as "Keeper of the office of Justiciar", with a salary of £250 a year, a mark of his high standing. During his brief tenure as Justiciar, he carried out a purge of dishonest Crown servants in Limerick, particularly those who had held office as Serjeant. Ball notes that Haye was inclined to clemency and compromise: eight of those charged with corruption were acquitted, and only one was hanged. He attended the 1297 session of the Parliament of Ireland as representative for Kilkenny. In 1298 he was again assisting and following the Justiciar and "holding the pleas", for which duty the King ordered that he be paid £40. He was still acting as a justice itinerant for County Dublin in 1306.

== Escheator ==
A petition of 1307 from the judge and landowner Robert Bagod the younger is now in the National Archives, and throws some light on de la Haye's duties and conduct as Escheator. Bagod petitioned the Crown to restore to him the rents, worth £100 a year, from certain lands at Baltray, County Louth, which had been assigned to Bagod by Nicholas, the late Archbishop of Armagh (died 1303) "in return for his good services", but which de la Haye as Escheator had taken into the Crown's hands, because the Archbishop did not have the King's license to make the assignment. The King "of his special grace" granted Bagod's request.

Other cases he dealt with usually involved the transfer of lands on the death of the landowner. He was ordered to take into the King's hands the estates of John Walchope deceased and inquire as to the identity of the heir and his age. In another case, he was ordered to require proof that John Waleys, son and heir of Elias Waleys, was of age, so that he could take possession of his late father's estates (in fact John was almost 30).

In 1291 he was ordered to grant to Hugh de Bruges, during the minority of the heirs, the lands of John de Courcy and Thomas de Clare situated in County Kerry and County Limerick. This, however, resulted in a lawsuit brought by Juliana, widow of Thomas de Clare, who claimed that her right of dower had been overlooked; perhaps another example oh Haye's high-handed behaviour. To strengthen her position Juliana remarried the prominent military commander Sir Adam de Cretinges, who was killed in action in 1295. In 1300 her eldest son Gilbert de Clare did homage for his father's lands, and on his mother's death in 1300 received her dower lands as well.

In 1292 the King wrote to Haye concerning the various claims to certain lands at Naul, County Meath, arising from the death of Robert de Cruys, the previous holder, and in particular how much was held from the King directly. The Cruys family became among the foremost landowners in Dublin, Meath and Louth in the next century, with their principal residence at Mount Merrion.

In 1298 Haye was ordered to take into the King's hands the Irish estates of Sir Adam de Cretinges (died 1295), second husband of Juliana de Clare. Adam had been killed fighting in the ill-fated English expedition to Gascony. This however seems to have been a formality, as there was no real doubt that Adam's heir was John, his son by his first wife Nichol or Nicola de Crioll. John did homage for his father's lands in 1300, and was later created a Baron.

In 1306 Haye conducted the first known inquiry into the rights attached to the salmon fisheries on the River Bandon at Bandon, County Cork, and in particular the rights of the de Courcy family, who held the feudal title Baron Kingsale. Not all cases involved rights over lands, as shown by the dispute in 1292 over the cargo of wine aboard the merchant ship Alice.

At Easter 1307 he assembled his court of inquiry to examine the state of the lordship of Carlow and the condition of Carlow Castle. Carlow, which had been part of the great Marshal inheritance, had reverted to the Crown on the death in 1306 of Roger Bigod, 5th Earl of Norfolk, grandson of one of the Marshal co-heiresses The outcome of the inquiry is unknown.

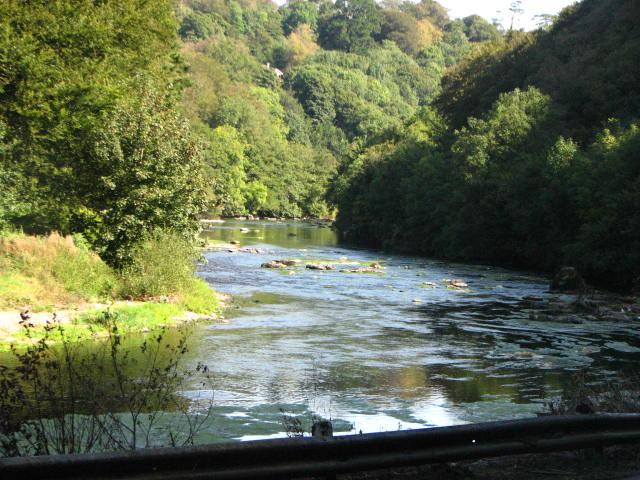
River Bandon

=== Escheator- The de la Rochelle inheritance ===
In 1290 the King ordered him to reopen the case of James Ketyng, who claimed to be heir by marriage to the estates of the de la Rochelle family: the case sheds some light on Irish inheritance law at the time, despite its unknown outcome. James had complained repeatedly that Haye in his capacity as Escheator had wrongfully taken into the King's hands the estates which James had acquired on his marriage to Margery de la Rochelle, now deceased. Margery was the granddaughter and eventual heiress of Sir Richard de la Rochelle, who had been Justiciar of Ireland in the 1250s and 60s. Haye ruled that the marriage had been childless and therefore the lands, in the absence of an heir, had reverted to the Crown on Margery's death. James argued that on the contrary he and Margery had a daughter called Roesia who died when just two weeks old, and that therefore by law the estates were his in right of his late wife; Haye was not accused of acting corruptly, but "in ignorance of the truth".

This apparently simple case was complicated by conflicting evidence as to whether Roesia ever existed (it seems that several years had elapsed since the alleged birth, so even truthful witnesses might have an imperfect recollection of events). The matter dragged on until at least 1300 and involved several court hearings. The outcome of the case is unknown: what seems to have been the last court session which inquired into the matter, which sat at Cashel in 1300, heard testimony from several witnesses who swore to Roesia's existence and that during her short life, "they often saw her and heard her voice".

== Last years ==
In 1308 he asked to be relieved of all his official duties on account of his failing eyesight. He was still alive in the early spring of the following year when he sold his lands at Knocktopher to Nigel le Brun (nephew of Fromund Le Brun, Lord Chancellor of Ireland) and his wife Amicia. He would no doubt have been disappointed to know that after his death his enemies the le Poers quickly acquired Kilmeadan Castle, where they remained until they were expelled by Cromwellian forces in about 1650. Knocktopher came through Amicia Le Brun's second marriage to the influential Cusack family of County Meath.

== Family ==
He married Alice le Bret of Knocktopher, widow of Milo le Bret: she held the Knocktopher estate as her dower. They had two sons and a daughter. His son William was High Sheriff of County Waterford in his turn, and his younger son Roger was a priest, who was presented to the living of Kilmeadan by King Edward I, and also acted as his father's Deputy as Escheator. His daughter Sibilla married Herbert de Marisco, a man of bad character, against whom serious crimes including rape and kidnapping were alleged. It seems that the penalty if he was found guilty of these crimes would be a fine, for which Haye stood guarantor.

The family seems to have died out within a generation or two. Edmund le Bret, who surrendered his interest in the family lands at Knocktopher, County Kilkenny in about 1292 to Haye, was his stepson, Alice's son by her previous marriage to Milo le Bret.
