= 1951 Meath Intermediate Football Championship =

Meath I.F.C.
- Season: 1951
- Champions: St. Patrick's; 1st Intermediate Football Championship title
- Relegated: Drumree (folded); Rathmolyon; St. Mary's Kilbeg

The 1951 Meath Intermediate Football Championship was the 25th edition of the Meath GAA's premier club Gaelic football tournament for intermediate graded teams in County Meath, Ireland. The tournament consisted of 10 teams. The championship format consisted of a group stage before progressing to a knock-out stage.

St. Mary's Kilbeg regraded from the 1950 S.F.C.

From 1951 onwards, the club formerly known as Ardcath were named St. Vincent's.

At the end of the season, Rathmolyon and St. Mary's Kilbeg (double drop down from 1950 S.F.C.) applied to be regraded to the 1952 J.F.C. The Drumree club folded altogether and weren't to enter a team into Meath GAA competitions again until the 1957 J.F.C. South Division.

On 28 October 1951, St. Patrick's claimed their 1st Intermediate championship title when defeating Ballinlough in the final at Pairc Tailteann. This triumph came within their first year as an established club, forming in late 1950 from an amalgamation of J.F.C. clubs Julianstown and Stamullen.

== Team changes ==
The following teams changed division since the 1950 championship season.

=== From I.F.C. ===
Promoted to 1951 S.F.C.

- Donaghmore

Relegated to 1951 J.F.C.

- Cushinstown Young Ireland's (folded)
- Moynalty

=== To I.F.C. ===
Regraded from 1950 S.F.C.

- St. Mary's Kilbeg

Promoted from 1950 J.F.C.

- Syddan 'B' - (Junior Quarter-Finalists & North District Champions)
- St. Patrick's - (Amalgamation of J.F.C. clubs Julianstown & Stamullen)

Strangely, J.F.C. finalists Carnaross (Kells District Champions), Trim 'B' (South District Champions) and Martry (Navan District Champions) were not promoted in spite of their further progression in the J.F.C. than Syddan 'B'.

== Group stage ==
There were 2 groups called Group A and B. The top finisher in each group qualified for the final. Many results were unavailable in the Meath Chronicle.

=== Group A ===
Team	Pld	W	L	D	PF	PA	PD	Pts
St. Patrick's	3	3	0	0	0	0	+0	6
St. Vincent's	3	2	1	0	0	0	+0	4
Syddan 'B'	4	2	2	0	0	0	+0	4
Duleek	2	1	1	0	0	0	+0	2
Drumree	4	0	4	0	0	0	+0	0

Round 1:

- St. Patrick's w, l Drumree, Kilmoon, 25/3/1951,
- St. Vincent's -vs- Duleek, Duleek, 18/3/1951,
- Syddan 'B' - Bye,

Round 2:

- Syddan 'B' w, l Duleek, Slane, 17/6/1951,
- St. Vincent's w/o, scr Drumree,
- St. Patrick's - Bye,

Round 3:

- St. Vincent's w, l Syddan 'B', Slane, 15/7/1951,
- St. Patrick's -vs- Duleek,
- Drumree - Bye,

Round 4:

- St. Patrick's w, l Syddan 'B', Slane, 2/9/1951,
- Duleek w/o, scr Drumree,
- St. Vincent's - Bye,

Round 5:

- St. Patrick's w, l St. Vincent's, Stamullen, 16/9/1951,
- Syddan 'B' w/o, scr Drumree,
- Duleek - Bye,

=== Group B ===
Team	Pld	W	L	D	PF	PA	PD	Pts
Ballinlough	3	3	0	0	0	0	+0	6
Dunderry	4	2	2	0	0	0	+0	4
Ballinabrackey	1	1	0	0	0	0	+0	2
St. Mary's Kilbeg	2	0	2	0	0	0	+0	0
Rathmolyon	4	0	4	0	0	0	+0	0

Round 1:

- Dunderry w, l Rathmolyon, Kilmessan, 18/3/1951,
- Ballinlough -vs- Ballinabrackey, Ballivor, 18/3/1951,
- Kilbeg - Bye,

Round 2:

- Dunderry 3-3, 2-4 Kilbeg, Kells, 10/6/1951,
- Ballinabrackey -vs- Rathmolyon,
- Ballinlough - Bye,

Round 3:

- Ballinlough 2-7, 2-2 Kilbeg, Kilskyre, 17/6/1951,
- Ballinabrackey w, l Dunderry, Ballivor, 26/8/1951,
- Rathmolyon - Bye,

Round 4:

- Ballinlough 1-6, 0-0 Rathmolyon, Kildalkey, 15/7/1951,
- Ballinabrackey -vs- Kilbeg, Ballivor, 26/8/1951,
- Dunderry - Bye,

Round 5:

- Ballinlough 2-4, 1-3 Dunderry, Kells, 2/9/1951,
- Kilbeg -vs- Rathmolyon,
- Ballinabrackey - Bye,

== Final ==
- St. Patrick's 0-7, 0-5 Ballinlough, Pairc Tailteann, 28/10/1951,
