= William de Essendon =

English-born cleric, lawyer

Sir William de Essendon, de Estdene or Eastdean (died after 1314) was an English-born cleric, lawyer and Crown official, much of whose career was spent in Ireland in the reign of Edward I of England and his son. He served twice as Lord High Treasurer of Ireland, and had a high reputation for integrity and efficiency.

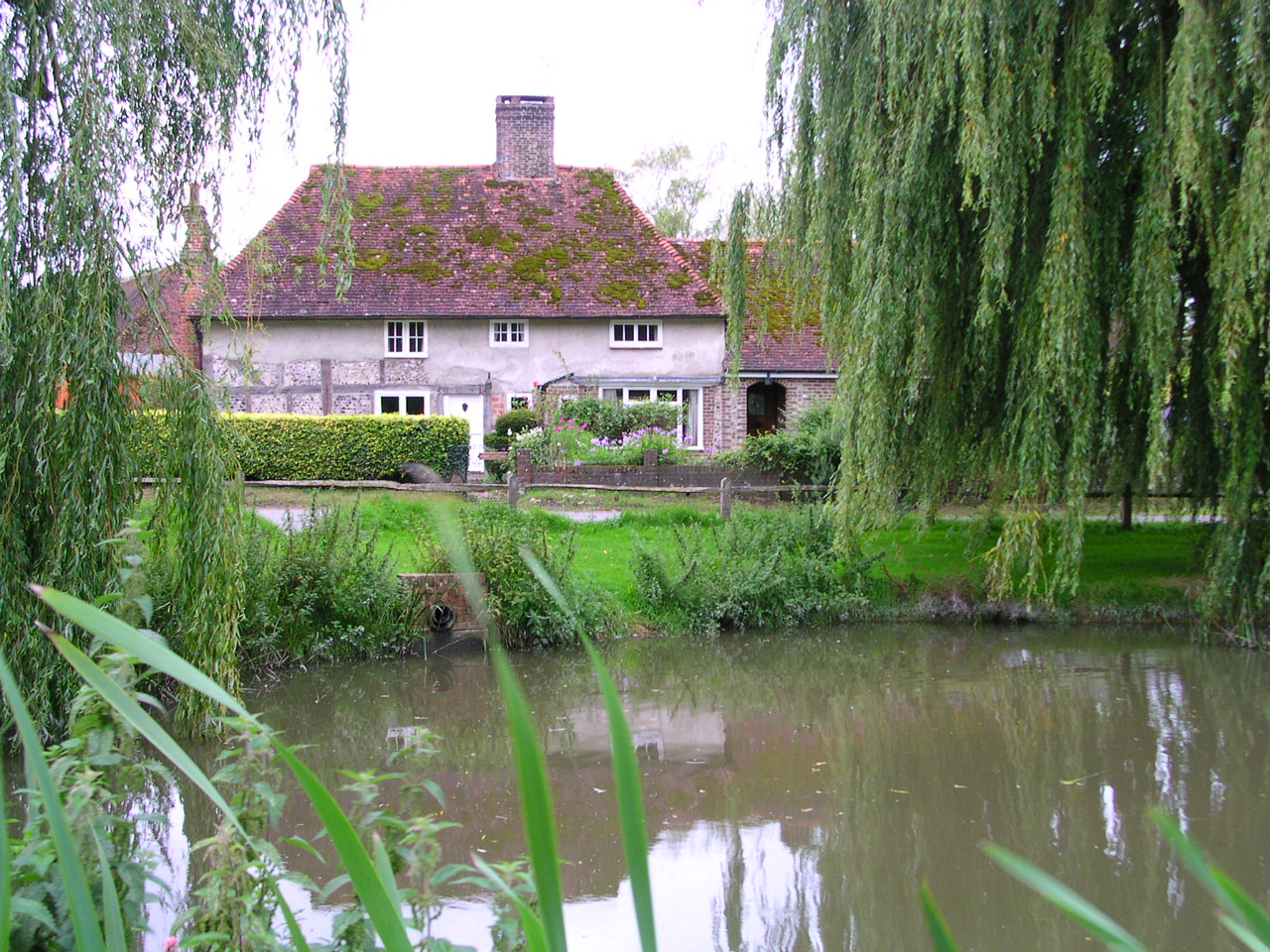
East Dean, West Sussex, where Essendon was born, and from which he took his surname

== Origins ==
He was a native of East Dean, West Sussex. His name means "William of East Dean", and he is referred to frequently in the official records as William de Estdene, or occasionally as William of Eastdean.

== English career ==
He was in holy orders, and was presented with the living of Ereford, Winchester in 1282. He enjoyed royal favour from quite early in his career, and in her last years (c.1289-91), Essendon acted as general attorney to the Queen Dowager of England, Eleanor of Provence, and as supervisor of her stewards, with power to investigate their activities on all of her estates.

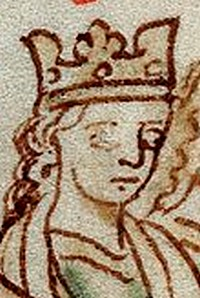
The Queen Dowager of England, Eleanor of Provence: Essendon was her general attorney in her last years

== Lord Treasurer of Ireland ==
He was chosen as Lord Treasurer of Ireland in 1292, and before going to Ireland that summer he had detailed discussions with officials of the English Exchequer about the state of the Irish Treasury. These discussions resulted in a royal ordinance bringing the practice of the Exchequer of Ireland into line with that of the Exchequer at Westminster. Soon after his arrival in Ireland the King granted him the manor of Chapelizod, in south Dublin. He also received a knighthood. His salary was £40 per annum, the standard salary then for senior officials and judges.

In 1293 he was appointed to head a royal commission to inquire into the numerous complaints of maladministration which had been made against the Justiciar of Ireland, William de Vesci, with instructions to report back to the Crown by the following spring. He travelled to England in April 1294 to report his findings in person to the King and Parliament. He also sat on a committee of three to find a suitable replacement as Justiciar, after de Vesci was removed from office: they chose Sir Walter de la Haye, the Chief Escheator of Ireland, who like Essendon had been a member of the commission of inquiry into de Vesci's conduct. (William fitz Roger, Prior of Kilmainham, who frequently acted as an itinerant justice, had been acting Justiciar in the interim). De Vesci was eventually restored to royal favour, but did not regain office as Justiciar; he died in 1297.

After 1294 Essendon was mainly occupied as Lord Treasurer with finding money to finance the King's wars with France and Scotland, and received royal thanks for his efforts. He witnessed a royal charter of no great importance, in 1299. In January 1300 he with the Justiciar of Ireland and the Lord Chancellor of Ireland was charged with selecting 300 hobelars (light cavalry) to send to the King at Carlisle by Midsummer Day, and to purvey sufficient food and wine for them. Part of the Exchequer Receipt Roll (the daily list of payments into the Exchequer) from 1295 survives, naming him as Treasurer.

== Later years ==
He stepped down as Treasurer in 1300, but served a second term in 1304–5. The Exchequer records show that in 1304 Master William de Wymondham, the Keeper of the Royal Exchanges at London and Canterbury, sent him a large quantity of silver and a number of stamps for coining money from the silver.

He was still alive in 1314 when Master William de la Ryvere appointed him as his attorney. De la Ryvere was a senior Crown servant who in 1309-10 had acted as the English envoy to the powerful Irish chieftain Gilla Isu Ruad O'Reilly to ensure his neutrality in the forthcoming clash between the English and another branch of the O'Reilly clan. Essendon's instructions were to act for De la Ryvere in a lawsuit for debt in the Court of Exchequer (Ireland) against the Prior of the Holy Trinity, Dublin.

Contemporary Irish Crown officials were frequently accused of incompetence, maladministration, and corruption. Essendon was regarded by contemporaries as efficient and honest in office.

== Sources ==
- "Vescy, William de" . Dictionary of National Biography. London: Smith, Elder & Co. 1885–1900.
- Haydn, Joseph The Book of Dignities Longman, Green, Brown and Longmans London 1851
- Mackay, Ronan "East Dean (de East Dean, Estdene, Estdean), William" Cambridge Dictionary of Irish Biography 2009
- Otway-Ruthven, A.J. A History of Medieval Ireland Barnes and Noble reissue New York 1993
- The Red Book of the Irish Exchequer Published in "Transactions of the Chronological Institute of London" 1852
- Sir James Ware History of Ireland 1745 edition, printed by S. Powell, Dublin
