= Patrick O'Kelly =

Patrick O'Kelly (1754–c.1835) was an Irish writer and eccentric.

O'Kelly was born in Loughrea, Ireland, and was noted in his lifetime for poems such as Killarney (1791) and the satire, Doneraile Litany, (1808). He was familiar with the upper echelons of literary society, becoming acquainted with Sir Walter Scott in 1821, and George IV in Dublin in 1821. He translated The History of Ireland by James Mac Geoghegan, written in France in the 1730s, from the original French: his translation was published in Dublin in 1831.

== Bibliography ==
- Killarney:a descriptive poem, Dublin, 1791.
- Poems on the Giant's Causeway and Killarney;and other miscellanies, Dublin, 1808.
- The Eudoxologist; or an eticographical survey of the western parts of Ireland. A poem, Dublin, 1812.
- Aonian Kaleidoscope;or a collection of original poems, Cork, 1824.
- The Hippocrene;a collection of poems, Dublin, 1831.
- Historica descriptio Hiberniae, opus. 2,. .editum .2,. .de novo a Patrick O'Kelly, G.D. O'Kelly, 1938.

Though often attributed, he is not the author of:

- General History of the Rebellion of 1798; .2,. . also a brief account of the insurrection of 1803, Dublin, 1842.

Its author states in the work to have been born c. 1780–81, gone to school in Moone Co. Kildare, and been involved in the events around the Battle of Kilcullen. He also asserts to be a translator and publisher of Abbe MacGeoghegan's History of Ireland'.
