= Cushinstown =

Townland in County Meath, Ireland

- Townland
- Location within Ireland
- Coordinates: 53.5877°N 6.4776°W
- Country: Ireland
- County: Meath
- Parish: Duleek

Cushinstown is a townland which, together with Roadmain and Curraghtown, is in the parish of Duleek, County Meath, Ireland. This entity is not, at any point geographically attached to the main part of the parish, so it might be said that these townlands are an "off-shore island of Duleek Parish". To confuse things further, the part of Cushinstown townland which extends from the stream at Schoolhouse towards "The Snail Box" is in Curraha parish. However, broadly speaking, the locality known as Cushinstown embraces those townlands which form the catchment area for the local school. Cushinstown is in a civil parish of the same name.

== Transport ==
The principal roads to Cushinstown are from Ardcath, Curraha, Garristown, Duleek/Drogheda and Slane/Dublin. The Dublin/Slane road N2 is one of the straightest in Ireland. Popular belief is that this straight road was built to facilitate trips in either direction by King George IV, who reputedly had a mistress in Slane - so "Route d'Amour" might not be an inappropriate title. Also along this route was Kilmoon ballroom, Cushinstown's ballroom of romance which flourished in the 1950s and 1960s. Kilmoon Cross has been a main thoroughfare for travellers since at least the late 1700s. The Cusack family had one of their principal homes here for several centuries.

== Economy ==
From available records it can be seen that the local economy from 1867 until the end of the 1950s was based entirely on agriculture.

== Sport ==
=== Cushinstown Athletic club ===
Prior to 1972, there was a small soccer club in the locality that catered for the sporting needs of young boys. In order to accommodate girls a dedicated group decided in 1972 to start an athletic club. The catchment area of the club includes athletes from Cushinstown, Curragha, Ardcath, Rathfeigh, Dueek and north of Ashbourne. At present, there are 150 members.

=== Gaelic Athletic Association ===
In 1947 the football clubs of Cushinstown and Bellowstown amalgamated under the name "Young Ireland" and in that year they won the Meath Junior Football championship. Young Ireland do not exist any longer as a Gaelic Athletic Association (GAA) club. There are several GAA clubs in the vicinity of Cushinstown these are St Vincents, Curragha, Duleek and Skryne.

Two of Meath's most distinguished footballers hail from Cushinstown - Peter McDermott and John McDermott. The records show that Peter McDermott attended St Cianain's School from 1923 until 1932. That is but one record. However, Peter has spent most of his life creating records - particularly in all aspects of GAA activity - so much so that it is very doubtful if his range of skills, successes and total commitment will ever be equalled let alone be surpassed. He played with Navan, Donaghmore, Ashbourne and Meath, and he won All-Ireland and Meath titles. He refereed the 1953 All-Ireland final. He managed the Meath football team. He managed the Ireland team vs Australia. In 1988 he received the Meath hall of fame award.

John Mcdermott attended Cushinstown school from 1975-82. He mostly played with Skryne. He won all Irelands in 1996 and 1999 and he won all stars in 1996.

== Education ==
There has been a school at Cushinstown since 1838. Before this, records indicate there was a hedge school. The original schoolhouse was located across the road from the present building and it acted in this capacity from 1841 to 1934.

=== St Cianain's National School Cushinstown ===
The school was founded in 1841. Records for that time show that the manager was Father Matthews P.P. and the principal was Mr. Molloy. Unfortunately, the years of the famine were not recorded. During the time from 1867-2000, almost 1200 pupils went to the school and in the same time, 232 different surnames were recorded.

The first schoolhouse was across the road from the current building and the school was there from 1841 until 1934. The current building was built around 1934 and had two rooms. Roughly around this time, there was a very strong possibility that the school would be closed down. The oil crises of 1973 prevented this with massive price hikes and economic slowdown the local children were able to continue to go to the local school. Many past pupils have had very successful careers like C.J. Haughey, a past Taoiseach who went to Cushinstown school in 1932 and 1933 while he lived in Greenpark.

There are 81 pupils, 3 main teachers and a learning support teacher. Inside the school, there are 3 main classrooms, an office and a learning support room. Outside there is a football pitch, a basketball court and a play area. The activities in the school are various. There is a Gaelic competition at the start of the year, the older classes do tag rugby in February and classes from senior infants to 6th do swimming in the summer. The school goes on many trips during the year. The school also does an academic quiz with the credit union yearly.
