= Walter de Cusack =

Irish judge and military commander (c. 1270 – 1334)

Walter de Cusack (c.1270- 1334) was an Anglo-Irish judge, magnate and military commander of the fourteenth century.

== Family background and early life ==
Walter de Cusack was a younger son of Sir Andrew Cusack of Gerrardstown, County Meath. He belonged to a leading Anglo-Irish family, the Cusacks, who came to Ireland soon after the Norman invasion in the late twelfth century and settled mainly in County Meath. Sir Andrew was a younger son of Geoffrey de Cusack, Lord of Killeen. Nicholas Cusack, Bishop of Kildare 1279-99, was a cousin, as presumably was the earlier Sir Walter Cusack who with his wife Elizabeth was ordered in 1392 to make a payment which they had promised under a writ of covenant to Walter Kerdiff of Ratoath.

== Military and State service ==
Walter was summoned by King Edward I for military service in the First War of Scottish Independence in 1303 and 1307, and probably on two or three later occasions. He sat in the Irish Parliament in 1310. He was appointed Chief Justice in Eyre (i.e. Chief Itinerant justice) in 1308, and was reappointed an itinerant justice in 1310, for County Dublin only (the eyre system was quickly being wound down). There is an interesting instruction in the Patent Roll to Walter and his fellow justices to decide cases concerning real property according to Irish law rather than English law: this is evidence that the two legal systems were already quite distinct. Shortly afterwards the eyre was cancelled, apparently due to continuing difficulties about which legal system was being used. He served as Deputy Justiciar of Ireland, and was a justice of the Justiciar's Court in 1317–18.

He was politically a close ally of the Justiciar, Roger Mortimer, 1st Earl of March, in the years 1316-8, and was steward of his Irish estates. For this reason his loyalty to King Edward II in the final crisis of his reign, which ended with the King's deposition and murder at Mortimer's hands, was questioned: he was accused of plotting treason, but the charges did not stick.

He may have seen military service during the Scottish Invasion of Ireland of 1315-18, as his son John undoubtedly did. About a year after the final defeat of the invasion, John petitioned the Council for compensation for his own and his father's losses in the King's service. The Privy Council, noting that John, but not apparently his father, was present at the Battle of Faughart in October 1318, where Edward Bruce, the leader of the invading army, was killed, recommended that John be awarded 50 marks (half what he had asked for).

== Personal life and legacy ==
He married firstly Matilda, daughter and co-heiress with her sister Isabella (who married Adam, eighth Lord of Howth) of William Pylate of Pylatestown (now Pelletstown, near Cabra, Dublin). He married secondly, after 1310, Amicia, widow of Nigel le Brun of Roebuck, Dublin, Escheator of Ireland. Through his second marriage he acquired Knocktopher Castle in County Kilkenny, which Nigel and Amicia had purchased from Sir Walter de la Haye, the former Justiciar of Ireland, in 1309. It passed to the Butler dynasty soon after his death. His marriage to Amicia was technically an offence since it seems that he did not have the King's permission to marry, which was required in the case of a widow. However, obtaining a pardon for this transgression was easy enough, and was quickly issued in this case.

He died in 1334, leaving issue from his first marriage, including Simon Cusack, Lord of Dangan Castle, and John Cusack of Belpere. His descendants were mainly associated with Cushinstown in County Meath. They included Sir Thomas Cusack, Lord Chancellor of Ireland, who died in 1571.

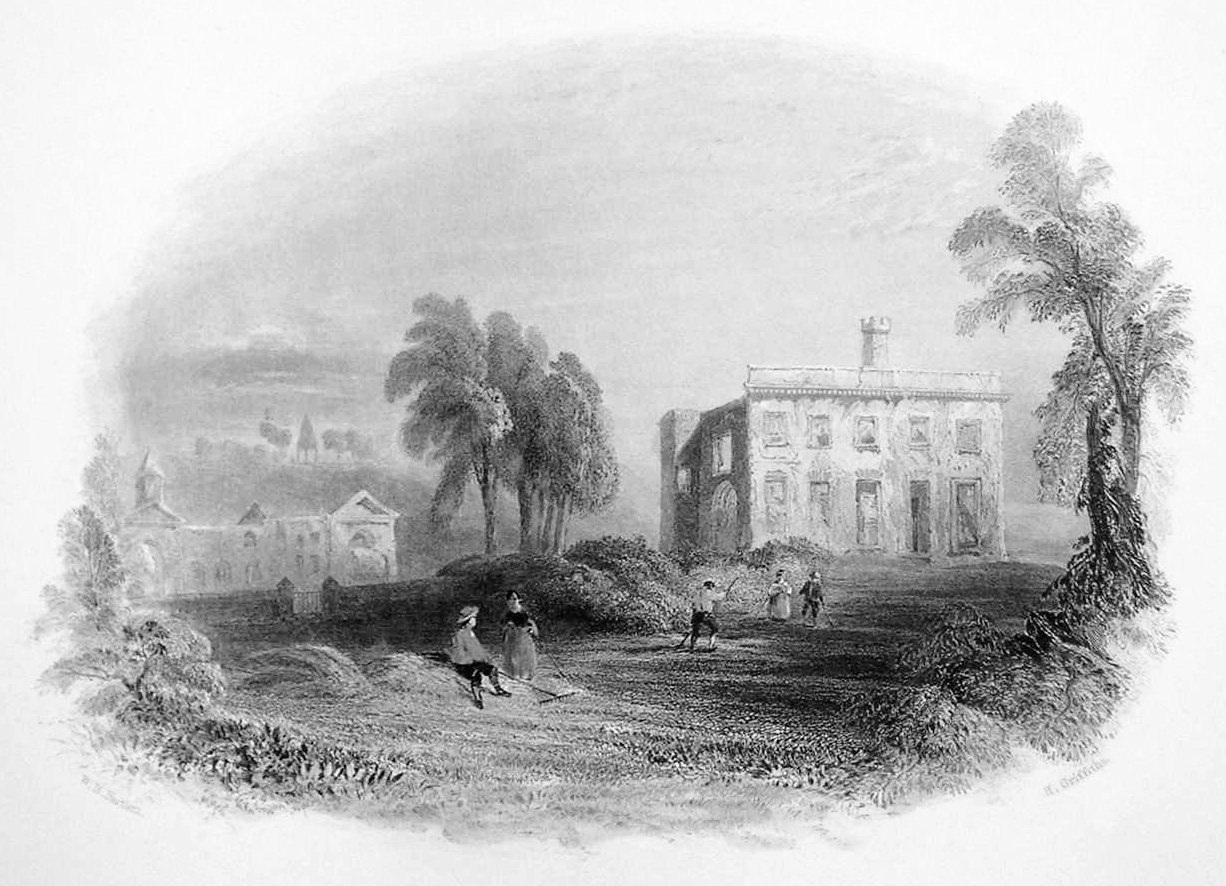
Dangan Castle, nineteenth century

== Sources ==
- Ball, F. Elrington The Judges in Ireland 1221-1921 London John Murray 1926
- Burke's Landed Gentry of Great Britain and Ireland London Henry Colburn 1850
- Dodd, Gwilym and Musson, Anthony, ed. The Reign of Edward II: New Perspectives York Medieval Press 2006
- Lodge, John Peerage of Ireland Moore and Co College Green Dublin 1789
- Patent Roll Edward II
- Smith, Brendan Colonisation and Conquest in Medieval Ireland: The English in Louth 1170-1330 Cambridge University Press 1999
