= Simon Fitz-Richard =

Irish landowner, barrister and judge

Sir Simon Fitz-Richard (died c.1348 ) was an Irish landowner, barrister and judge. He became Chief Justice of the Irish Common Pleas, and fought a long and successful campaign against the efforts of his enemies to remove him from office, despite the numerous accusations of corruption which were made against him.

== Career ==
He was probably a native of County Louth, where he later owned land, and he also held land in County Kildare. He benefited from the patronage of Maurice FitzGerald, 4th Earl of Kildare and other members of the-FitzGerald dynasty As a very young man he may have visited Flanders.

He was appointed Deputy Escheator of Louth about 1315, and was given custody of the temporalities of the Archdiocese of Armagh in 1321. During the Scottish Invasion of Ireland of 1315-18, Fitz-Richard took part in an official inquiry into the conduct of "the King's enemy" Walter de Lacy, who was accused of joining Edward Bruce, who led the invasion, in Ulster, and of Walter's father-in-law, Sir Richard de Exeter, who was Simon's predecessor as Chief Justice. Walter de Lacy suffered forfeiture of his estates, but no action was taken against de Exeter.

Simon appears as a Crown prosecutor in the 1320s and in 1326 he became the King's Serjeant, with a salary of £5 a year. In 1331 he became a puisne justice of the Court of Common Pleas (Ireland) and in 1335 he was appointed Chief Justice of the Common Pleas. He held lands in Louth and Ulster and at Maynooth, County Kildare, and was granted Gormanston, County Meath as a reward for unspecified losses in the King's service, as well as receiving a payment of £100 from the Exchequer of Ireland. On the death of John de Bermingham, 1st Earl of Louth, who was killed by his own tenants in the Braganstown Massacre of 1329, FitzRichard was granted wardship of the Earl's two daughters and co-heiresses, Catherine and Maud: presumably it was he who arranged their marriages, to Edmund Lacy and Sir William Tealing respectively. He had a royal licence to export corn. He acquired great wealth, and by 1336 he was rich enough to make a merchant a loan of £1000: they later went into partnership.

== Judge- allegations of corruption ==
During the 1330s complaints were made to the English Crown about the poor quality of the Irish administration, and in particular about the failings of the Irish-born judges. In 1337 Thomas Charlton, Bishop of Hereford, was appointed Lord Chancellor of Ireland, with specific instructions to remove from the Bench those Irish judges who were considered to be unfit for office, and to find English replacements. Fitz-Richard, who had a bad reputation for corruption, and frequently took bribes in return for giving a favourable judgment, was one of those marked for dismissal.Robert de Scardeburgh, Fitz-Richard's predecessor in the Common Pleas, was nominated to take his place but did not come over to Ireland. Fitz-Richard went to England where he pleaded his case before the King: he was reappointed as Chief Justice and given various tokens of royal favour.

== Later life ==
He resigned from the Chief Justiceship in 1341; this was probably in connection with the charges of corruption and maladministration which had been made against him and other Irish judges, including Elias de Asshebournham. The following year he was accused of felony in England and arrested for trespass in Ireland, but nothing seems to have come of these charges, possibly due to the influence of the Earl of Kildare, to whom he remained close. He did however forfeit a number of privileges which the King had granted him.

In 1355 yet another complaint about his conduct as a judge came to the King's attention. One John de la Pulle, accused of assault by Margery Poe, complained that Fitz-Richard and his colleague John Gernoun had simply adjourned the case without giving judgement, to John's great prejudice. Fitz-Richard's successor Thomas de Dent was ordered to make a full inquiry and remedy any injustice done.

He went to England in 1348 on official business: while there he stood bail for Kildare, who had recently been arrested and imprisoned due to suspicions about his loyalty to the English Crown. Fitz-Richard was knighted in the same year, but is thought to have died shortly afterwards. Towards the end of his life, he sold much of his substantial landholdings in County Louth. He married a daughter of Thomas FitzOvery.
