= Thomas Kent (Irish judge) =

Irish judge

Sir Thomas Kent (c. 1460–1511) was an Irish judge who held office as Chief Baron of the Irish Exchequer.

He was born in Drogheda, and like almost all Irish judges of the time, he belonged to the Anglo-Irish gentry of the Pale. His family came from Kent in South East England to County Meath in the thirteenth century. Sir William Darcy, Vice-Treasurer of Ireland, was his cousin. It is unclear if he was related to the Thomas Kent, clerk, who was Deputy to the Chancellor of the Exchequer of Ireland in 1452.

Kent and Darcy were in Dublin in 1482–3, studying law. The King's Inn, Ireland's law school, was not founded until the next century, but a rudimentary form of legal education did exist in Ireland. Darcy many years later recalled that he and Kent lodged with John Estrete, the Deputy Chief Baron, to study those legal texts, notably the Treatise on Tenures by Thomas de Littleton, and Estrete's own text Natura Brevium, (now lost), a knowledge of which was necessary to allow a student to proceed to the English Inns of Court and qualify as a barrister. During the holidays they visited the home of Philip Bermingham, the Lord Chief Justice of Ireland, to learn dancing and how to play the harp; these were not simply recreations but were an essential part of a young lawyer's education. Kent then proceeded to London; most likely he went to Lincoln's Inn, where his cousin William Darcy had enrolled in 1485.

In 1495 Kent was appointed to an official post, Escheator of the Exchequer of Ireland, and also became Escheator of County Meath. In 1496-7 he was appointed Serjeant. The appointment suggests that Kent was a protégé of Gerald FitzGerald, 8th Earl of Kildare, who had been restored to favour after a period of disgrace, due to his unsuccessful efforts to place two pretenders on the English throne. Kildare obtained from King Henry VII the right to appoint all Irish judges and law officers except the Lord Chancellor of Ireland. Hart believes that Kent's appointment marks a return to the practice of appointing Irish-born judges, whereas after the Lambert Simnel rebellion, of which Kildare had been the prime instigator, the practice had been to appoint judges of English birth whose loyalty to the Crown could presumably be relied on.

Kent was appointed Chief Baron in 1504 and knighted in 1509; he died in 1511.

In 1508 he was chosen to be a member of the new Guild of the Fraternity of the Blessed Virgin Mary of the House of St. Thomas the Martyr. This was one of the Guilds of the City of Dublin, and represented the city's carpenters, millers, masons and tilers.
