= Robert Lindsay (Tyrone MP) =

Irish barrister, judge and politician

Robert Lindsay (1679–1743) was an Irish barrister, politician and judge in eighteenth-century Ireland. He is best remembered for his close friendship with Jonathan Swift, whom he advised on the legal aspects of the Drapier Letters.

He was born at Loughry, County Tyrone, elder son of Robert Lindsay and Anne Morris, daughter of John Morris of Bellville. His father died in 1691 and he inherited the family estate. He went to school in Drogheda and graduated from Trinity College Dublin in 1700. He entered the Inner Temple in 1703 and was called to the Irish Bar in 1709.

A warm friendship existed between Lindsay and Dean Swift, despite Swift's generally low opinion of lawyers and judges. Lindsay advised Swift on some legal points concerning the Drapier Letters, and Swift was probably responsible for Lindsay's appointment as Proctor's counsel and later Seneschal (legal adviser) of St Patrick's Cathedral, Dublin. While Swift in old age quarrelled with many of his friends, his friendship with Lindsay endured till the latter's death, and Swift had intended him to be one of his executors. He also acted as legal adviser to Esther Van Homrigh, Swift's much-loved "Vanessa".

He entered the Irish House of Commons as member for County Tyrone in 1729. In 1733 he was appointed a justice of the Court of Common Pleas (Ireland). He died in Dublin early in 1743 and was buried there in St Catherine's Church.

In 1707 he married Elizabeth Singleton, daughter of Edward Singleton of Drogheda and Catherine Newton; her numerous siblings included Henry Singleton, Chief Justice of the Irish Common Pleas, who was also a close friend of Swift. They had one surviving daughter Anne, who never married, and a son who died young. Loughry passed to Robert's brother John.

== Sources ==
- Ball, F. Elrington The Judges in Ireland 1221-1921 London John Murray 1926
- Bergin, John "Lindsay, Robert" Cambridge Dictionary of Irish Biography
