= William Darcy =

Anglo-Irish statesman (c.1460–1540)

Sir William Darcy (c.1460–1540) was a leading Anglo-Irish statesman of the Pale in the early sixteenth century; for many years he held the office of Vice-Treasurer of Ireland. He wrote an influential treatise, The Decay of Ireland, which led to his being called "the father of the movement for political reformation in Ireland". He was a colourful and flamboyant character, whose exceptional height gave rise to his nickname "Great Darcy".

== Background and early career ==
He was born at Platten in County Meath, son of John Darcy IV of Platten and his wife Elizabeth Plunkett, daughter of Christopher Plunkett, 2nd Baron Killeen and Elizabeth Welles. The Darcys of Platten were a junior branch of the family of Baron Darcy de Knayth, and had become one of the leading families of the Pale through intermarriage with other landed families such as the Plunketts and St Lawrences. Through his mother, he was a great-grandson of Sir William Welles, Lord Chancellor of Ireland. The family held five manors in Meath, valued at £150 in total, of which Rathwire (now Killucan and Rathwire in County Westmeath) was the most substantial, and smaller holdings in County Louth.

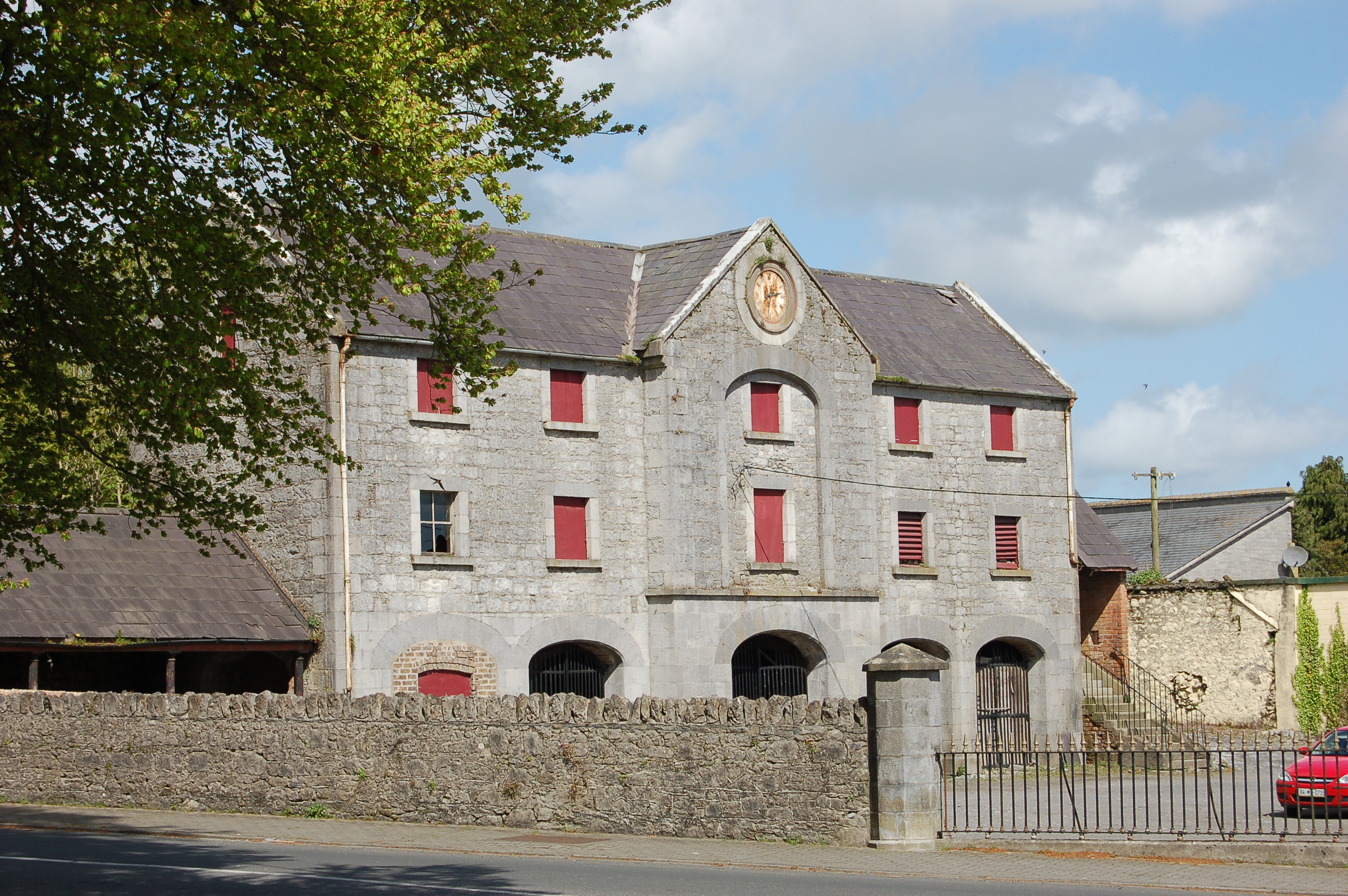
Rathwire, County Westmeath, where the Darcy family had their principal estate

He was in Dublin, studying law, in 1482-3, along with his cousin Thomas Kent, the future Chief Baron of the Irish Exchequer. The King's Inns, Ireland's first law school, was not founded until a year after Darcy's death, but a rudimentary form of professional instruction for barristers was provided by senior Irish judges. Darcy lodged at the house of the King's Serjeant, John Estrete, with whom he studied those English legal texts which were considered to be essential for the education of those students (by no means all of them) who intended to practice law. Estrete himself has written one of these texts, Natura Brevium. Estrete also taught them Law French (the official language of the law courts), which Darcy was still using to good effect fifty years later. During the holidays the students visited the Lord Chief Justice of Ireland, Philip Bermingham, to study dancing and the harp: these were not simply recreations, but were considered to be an essential part of a young lawyer's education.

Darcy then proceeded to Lincoln's Inn, where he was enrolled in 1485; he was fined for unspecified misconduct in the Trinity term of that year and returned to Ireland soon after.

== Service under the Earls of Kildare ==
He was a protégé of Gerald FitzGerald, 8th Earl of Kildare, who for much of the period 1478–1513 was so powerful that he was called "the uncrowned King of Ireland". Darcy assisted the Earl in two of his more notable ventures: the first was the failed attempt to put the pretender Lambert Simnel on the English throne. At Simnel's coronation in Christchurch Cathedral, Dublin on 24 May 1487 the boy, "to be visible to all" was carried on the shoulders of "Great Darcy of Platten" (Darcy, as we know from several sources, was an exceptionally tall man, reputedly the tallest in Ireland). Simnel invaded England with an Irish army, but his pretensions were crushed at the Battle of Stoke Field. However, the victorious King Henry VII of England was merciful in victory. He readily issued pardons to Simnel himself and to most of his Irish supporters, including Darcy, who later received a knighthood, and Kildare.

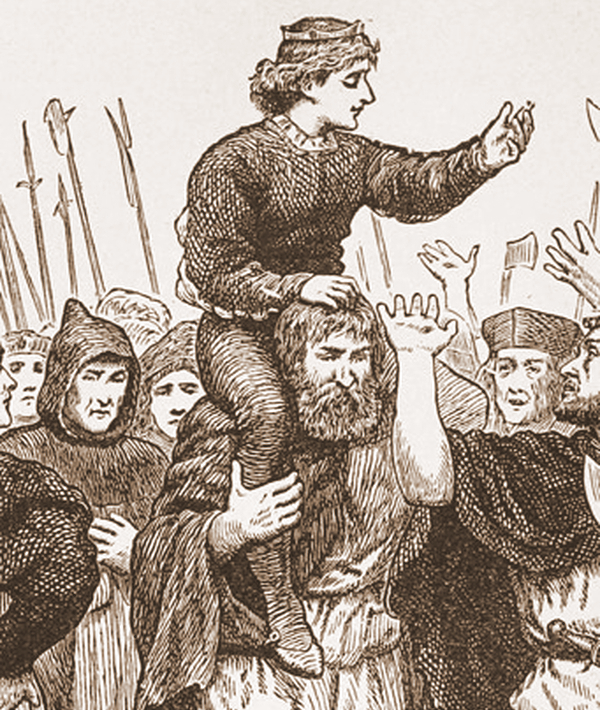
Lambert Simnel in Ireland: the man carrying him on his shoulders is probably Darcy, who carried him at his coronation

The second enterprise was the Battle of Knockdoe in 1504, where the Earl crushed the power of the Burkes of Clanricarde. McSwire, the chief of the Irish gallowglasses, singled out "Great Darcy" and struck a blow which brought him to his knees. Darcy's life was saved by the "lusty warrior" John Nangle, 16th Baron of Navan, who gave McSwire "such payment as would satisfy him for the rest of his life".

He sat on the Earl's household council and at his request was made Vice-Treasurer of Ireland. His flourishing career was dealt a blow by Poynings' Parliament of 1494, which passed an act for the resumption of lands held by those whose loyalty to the Crown was questionable: the lands affected included most of Darcy's estates. Darcy visited England and may have obtained a personal audience with King Henry. At any rate, he was allowed to retain most of his manors, although the legal position of Rathwire, the most valuable, remained uncertain to the end of his life.

After the 8th Earl died in 1513, relations between Darcy and the Kildare family deteriorated. The 8th Earl's son and heir Gerald FitzGerald, 9th Earl of Kildare has been praised as a man of intelligence, charm and diplomatic skill, but there seems to have been ill-feeling between himself and Darcy, who lost both the office of Vice-Treasurer and his place on the Earl's council. This may have prompted him to write The Decay of Ireland, which, though it addressed wider problems, was partly a personal attack on Kildare.

== The Decay of Ireland ==
The Decay of Ireland was originally a series of articles presented by Darcy to the English Privy Council in London in 1515. Darcy argued that the English Lordship of Ireland had once been strong and prosperous, but had fallen into decline for two main reasons: chronic neglect of Irish affairs by the English Crown, and the carving out of semi-independent lordships, held by the three great Earls, the Earl of Desmond, the Earl of Ormond and Kildare himself. By use of what was later called bastard feudalism – the practice of great noblemen of hiring private armies which owed loyalty only to their employer, not to the Crown – the Earls had made themselves virtually independent of the Crown. This, combined with the creeping Gaelicisation even of those parts of Ireland which were under English rule, meant that the Crown effectively controlled only the Pale, and might soon lose even that.

Darcy proposed no remedy for the misgovernment of Ireland, although it was clear that he regarded the great power of the Earl of Kildare as a threat to the Crown (the Earl could of course have pointed out that Darcy himself owed everything he had to the Kildare dynasty). Although he deplored the increasing Gaelic influence on the Anglo-Irish and refused ostentatiously to adopt any Gaelic fashion, he was personally tolerant enough in racial matters – he spoke fluent Irish and married one of his daughters to Sir Hugh O'Donnell, one of the most prominent leaders of Gaelic Ireland.

== Reaction to the treatise and Darcy's later career ==
Darcy's treatise had a great influence on later writers such as the eminent judge Patrick Finglas, but it did nothing to restore him to official favour in the short term or to damage Kildare's career, and later historians have criticised it as "crude and sketchy". By the early 1520s however Kildare was in disfavour with the Crown, whereas Darcy had earned the respect of Surrey, the Lord Deputy of Ireland, although he caused the Government some embarrassment by seriously overstating the profits from the Irish revenues. He was restored to the office of Vice-Treasurer in 1523; when Kildare was restored to power in 1524, it was on condition that he mend relations with Darcy. Two widowed ladies of the Darcy family married into the Fitzgerald clan, and Kildare's brother Richard later married Darcy's granddaughter Maud, although the marriage can hardly have gratified her grandfather, as the couple were generally believed to have murdered Maud's first husband, and Richard's involvement in the rebellion of his nephew Silken Thomas ultimately cost him his life. The Rebellion itself was a great blow to Darcy, as was the death of his eldest son George, to whom he had increasingly delegated many of his duties, in 1531. A lengthy dispute with the Exchequer of Ireland over his right to Rathwire was ended abruptly when Silken Thomas burned the castle. Otherwise, the Darcy lands survived the rebellion more or less unscathed.

Darcy died "far advanced in years" in 1540. In his last years he was blind, and spent much of his time at the Grey Friars monastery in Drogheda. He was remembered as a man of "great wisdom and learning" who deserved great merit from the English for his services to English rule in Ireland.

== Family ==
Darcy married firstly, after 1487, Margaret St. Lawrence, daughter of Nicholas St Lawrence, 4th Baron Howth and widow of Walter Marward, Baron Skryne, and secondly Catherine Simon. He had at least three sons by his first marriage:

- George (died 1531) who married Jane Riccard, and by her was the father of Maud, Baroness Skryne
- John (died 1558)
- Christopher

- and three daughters:

- Eleanor, who married Robert Plunkett, 5th Baron of Dunsany
- a daughter who married Richard Golding, Chief Baron of the Irish Exchequer
- Margery, who married Sir Hugh Duff O'Donnell (Aodh Dubh) of County Donegal, one of the dominant Gaelic leaders in Ulster.

Nicholas Darcy was still holding Platten under the Cromwellian regime in 1654, despite being described as a Papist.

=== The life of Maud Darcy, Baroness Skryne ===
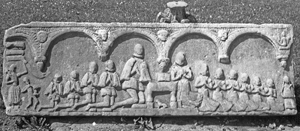
The Trevet memorial to Sir William's granddaughter Maud Darcy and her third husband Sir Thomas Cusack

Sir William was given the wardship of James Marward, titular Baron Skryne, (grandson of his first wife Margaret and her first husband), and married him to his granddaughter Maud, a decision he must have later regretted when Maud, according to popular belief, had her husband murdered in 1534 by Richard FitzGerald, whom she later married (Richard was the half-brother of Darcy's old enemy, the 9th Earl of Kildare). Richard was executed for his part in the Silken Thomas Rebellion. Maud herself was convicted of treason and sentenced to death, but later pardoned.

Soon afterwards she remarried Sir Thomas Cusack, Lord Chancellor of Ireland, by whom she had thirteen children. In notable contrast to her troubled earlier marital history, this was a happy and scandal-free marriage. The couple are commemorated together in the Cusack family monument in Trevet Church, County Meath. She died sometime before 1560.
