= Thomas Louth =

English-born Irish judge

Thomas Louth, or Thomas de Luda (died after 1338) was an English-born judge who spent much of his career in Ireland. He was notable for his long and ultimately unsuccessful struggle with Elias de Asshebournham for the office of Lord Chief Justice of Ireland.

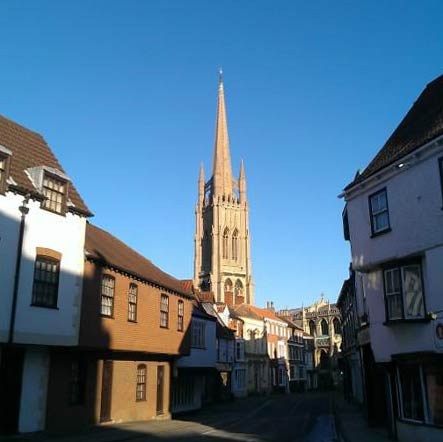
St James Church in Louth, Lincolnshire where Thomas was born

He was a native of Louth, Lincolnshire, and was sometimes known by the Latin version of his name, Thomas de Luda (people born in Louth are still called "Ludensians"). In 1324 he appears on a commission of oyer and terminer. In the same year, he was appointed a judge of the Court of Common Pleas (Ireland) but did not take up the latter office.

In 1331 he was appointed Lord Chief Justice of Ireland; he moved to Ireland and was granted lands at Howth, north of Dublin city. He then began a struggle with the Dublin-born judge Elias de Asshebournham for the office; the struggle lasted for most of the decade, and each man replaced the other so often that it is difficult to determine which of them held office at any given time. There was a genuine concern on the part of the English Crown about the poor quality of Irish-born judges, so Louth as an Englishman should have had the advantage; but Asshebournham, whose father had been a highly regarded royal servant, also had influence at Court. In 1337 Louth suffered what seemed to be a decisive defeat when he was imprisoned for unspecified "excesses", yet the following year he was restored to office after "laudable testimony" to his good conduct, only to be finally removed from office later the same year. His rival Asshebournham stepped down in 1341.

He was probably the father of Thomas, son of Thomas de Luda, who in 1341 with his wife Margaret agreed to lease a house in Ruislip, Middlesex to Nicholas de Shoreditch.

Legal offices
Preceded by Peter Tilliol	Lord Chief Justice of Ireland; 1332-33	Succeeded by Robert de Scardeburgh
Preceded by Robert de Scardeburgh	Lord Chief Justice of Ireland; 1334-37	Succeeded by Elias de Asshebournham
Preceded by Elias de Asshebournham	Lord Chief Justice of Ireland; 1337	Succeeded by Elias de Asshebournham
Preceded by Elias de Asshebournham	Lord Chief Justice of Ireland; 1338	Succeeded by Elias de Asshebournham
