= Sir William Yorke, 1st Baronet =

English politician (1700 – 1776)

- Predecessor: New Creation
- Successor: Extinct
- Born: 1700; Northampton, England
- Died: 1776 (aged 75–76)
- Spouse: Charity Singleton
- Father: Philip Yorke, 1st Earl of Hardwicke

Sir William Yorke, 1st Baronet PC (c. 1700 – 30 September 1776) was an English-born politician and judge in eighteenth-century Ireland, who held office as Chief Justice of the Irish Common Pleas and as Chancellor of the Exchequer of Ireland. His last years were plagued by ill health; he suffered agonies from a kidney stone, and his death was caused by an accidental drug overdose, which he took in an effort to relieve the chronic pain.

== Family ==
Yorke was born in Northampton, son of the Reverend John Yorke. The future Lord Chancellor, Philip Yorke, 1st Earl of Hardwicke, was his cousin. William, unlike Philip, is said to have been only a mediocre lawyer, who owed his career advancement largely to his family connections. He was educated at the Charterhouse and the University of Cambridge and was called to the Bar about 1723. Not much is recorded about his legal practice: in 1743 he was appointed a judge of the Irish Court of Common Pleas.

== Career ==
Yorke found life in Ireland extremely agreeable, writing enthusiastic letters to his friends at home about the warmth of Irish hospitality and the civilised conversation he enjoyed there. For his Chief, Henry Singleton, he had the greatest regard both as man and judge, and their personal ties were strengthened in 1744 when Yorke married Singleton's widowed niece Charity Cope, the daughter of Henry's brother Rowland Singleton, vicar of Termonfeckin, County Louth, and his wife Elizabeth Graham, and widow of William Cope. Charity brought him a comfortable fortune, with which he bought Rathmines Old Castle from the Temple family, and rebuilt it.

His marriage into the Singleton family brought another very useful family connection to Philip Tisdall, who was Attorney General for Ireland for many years, and who had married Charity's sister Mary Singleton. As Singleton's health began to fail, Yorke nudged him gently towards retirement: in 1753 Singleton stepped down as Chief Justice, and was replaced by Yorke; soon afterwards Singleton accepted the sinecure of Master of the Rolls in Ireland.

Ironically, having worked so hard to become Chief Justice of the Irish Common Pleas, Yorke found that he was unsuited to the office. In particular, like many judges in Ireland at the time, he found going on assize an ordeal, and he may already have begun to suffer from the kidney stone which caused him such agony in later life. Even before Singleton died in 1759, Yorke was hoping to take his place – in the end, he settled for another sinecure, Chancellor of the Exchequer of Ireland.

In 1761, he was created a baronet, of Dublin. He resigned as Chancellor of the Exchequer in 1763 and retired to England shortly afterwards.

A portrait of Yorke in his judicial robes by Irish painter Philip Hussey (died 1783) still exists.

== Death ==
He died at Brentford in 1776: Elrington Ball has an interesting reference to the cause of death as "accidental poisoning". A contemporary newspaper report elaborates on the story, and states that the poisoning was the result of an unfortunate mistake by his servant. Yorke, who was suffering agonies from a kidney stone, had been prescribed laudanum (liquid opium) to alleviate the pain. Although the servant had been instructed by the apothecary as to the proper dosage, on the day in question he evidently forgot his instructions, and simply handed the full bottle of laudanum to Yorke, who was in such pain from his kidney stone that he drank it all at one sitting. He died an hour later from the effects of the overdose. His widow died in 1779, aged 72.

Baronetage of Ireland
New creation	Baronet (of Dublin); 1761–1776	Extinct
Legal offices
Preceded by Henry Singleton	Chief Justice of the Irish Common Pleas; 1753–1761	Succeeded by Richard Aston
