= Philip Bermingham =

Irish judge

Philip Bermingham (c.1420–1490) was an Irish judge who held the office of Lord Chief Justice of Ireland. He was regarded as "the most learned Irish lawyer of his time", but he had a somewhat turbulent political career and was twice accused of treason.

== Background ==
He belonged to a junior branch of the great Anglo-Irish dynasty of Bermingham, which held the titles Earl of Louth and Baron Athenry. He was probably the grandson of John Bermyngham, judge of the Court of King's Bench (Ireland), who died in 1415. Patrick Bermingham, a later Chief Justice, was his cousin. Little seems to be known of his own parents.

== Career ==
He is first heard of during the Wars of the Roses, when he was acting as legal adviser to James Butler, 5th Earl of Ormonde, who was a staunch supporter of the House of Lancaster. Ormonde was executed by the rival dynasty, the House of York, after their decisive victory at the Battle of Towton in March 1461, and Bermingham himself was condemned to death as a traitor in 1462. He soon received a royal pardon and, under the tolerant regime of the new Yorkist King Edward IV, his Lancastrian past was not held against him.

He became King's Serjeant in Ireland in 1463; the following year he was nominated as Chief Justice of the Irish Common Pleas but for unknown reasons did not take up that office. He held lands in County Louth, and also at Dunshaughlin in County Meath where he helped found a chantry. In 1474 he was appointed Lord Chief Justice of Ireland. His predecessor, John Chevir, whose wife was a Bermingham, left part of his estate to him. In 1478 he was described as one of those "men of influence" who opposed the new Lord Deputy of Ireland, Henry, Lord Grey of Codnor. Bermingham and his allies entirely frustrated Grey's efforts to establish his authority in Ireland, leading to his recall to England.

== Readings in the law ==
At a time when there was no formal training for law students in Dublin, Bermingham was one of a number of senior judges who provided a rudimentary legal education for those students who would later go on to one of the English Inns of Court. Many years later Sir William Darcy, the Vice-Treasurer of Ireland, recalled that in 1482-3 he had been one of a number of students who read the leading English legal texts with John Estrete, Deputy to the Chief Baron of the Irish Exchequer, and studied Law French (necessary for pleading in Court), while during the holidays Bermingham taught them dancing and the harp (these activities were not simply for recreation but formed part of a young lawyer's education).

Nicholas Sutton, Baron of the Court of Exchequer (Ireland), who died young in 1478, thought highly enough of him to leave his own family in Bermingham's care.

== Later years ==
He was continued in office by Richard III and Henry VII. Like nearly all the Anglo-Irish nobility he made the mistake of supporting the pretender Lambert Simnel, and faced charges of treason after the ruin of Simnel's cause at the Battle of Stoke Field. Henry VII, however, was determined on a policy of clemency, and Bermingham, together with most of his judicial colleagues, (as well as Simnel himself) was quickly pardoned. In 1488 he pledged his fealty to the King in the person of the King's representative, Sir Richard Edgcumbe.

== Family ==
Little seems to be known about his wife. His daughter Catherine married Christopher Plunket of Dunsoghly and was the mother of another Chief Justice, Sir John Plunket.

He died in 1490 and was buried in Christ Church Cathedral, Dublin. He was described as "a man pre-eminently learned in the laws of his country".

Legal offices
Preceded by John Chevir	Lord Chief Justice of Ireland; 1474–1490	Succeeded by Thomas Cusacke
