= Robert de Scardeburgh =

English judge

Robert de Scardeburgh, or de Scardeburg (died after 1351) was an English judge who also held high judicial office in Ireland.

He was born in Scarborough, North Yorkshire, from which he took his surname. He is thought to have been a nephew of Robert de Scarborough, who was Dean of York 1279-90.

In 1331 he was commissioner of assize for Jersey, Guernsey, Alderney and Sark, and in the same year he became Chief Justice of the Irish Common Pleas. In 1332 he received an unspecified reward for his good services in Ireland and a grant of lands at Malahide, north of Dublin city. In 1334 he returned to England to become a judge of the Court of King's Bench. He was transferred to the Court of Common Pleas and then back to King's Bench. He also served on a commission of array in Yorkshire in 1339.

In the late 1330s, the poor quality of the Irish judges was giving great concern to the English Crown. The Lord Chancellor of Ireland, Thomas Charlton, Bishop of Hereford, was instructed to remove those Irish judges who were considered to be unfit for office and replace them with judges of English birth. Scardeburgh was re-selected for his old position of Chief Justice of Common Pleas in Ireland to replace Simon Fitz-Richard, who had a bad reputation for bribery and corruption, but Fitz-Richard fought a successful campaign to retain his place and Scardeburgh did not come over to Ireland.

In 1344, Fitz-Richard having stepped down, Scardeburgh finally returned to Ireland as Lord Chief Justice of Ireland, with custody of the seals of both the courts he presided over, and the fees attached to them. He was still alive seven years later.

Legal offices
Preceded by Thomas Louth	Lord Chief Justice of Ireland "but probably did not act" 1333-34	Succeeded by Thomas Louth
Preceded by Thomas de Dent	Lord Chief Justice of Ireland; 1344-45	Succeeded by John le Hunt
