= Richard Aston =

English judge (1717–1778)

The Right Honourable Sir Richard Aston
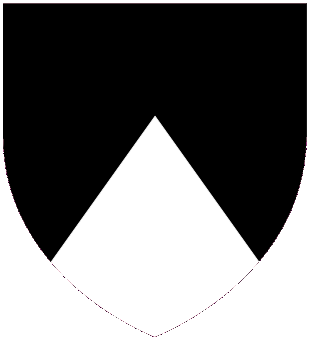
- Arms, displayed at Lincoln's Inn
- Born: 1717; Great Britain
- Died: 1 March 1778 (aged 60–61); Great Britain
- Occupation: Judge

Sir Richard Aston (1717 – 1 March 1778) was an English judge who served as King's Counsel and Lord Chief Justice of the Court of Common Pleas in Ireland. Aston worked to reform law practice, specifically to change the process in which bills of indictment were issued without the examination of witnesses. After leaving his post in Ireland, he joined Lord Mansfield's court.

== Lineage ==
Aston was the son of Richard Aston, Esq., of Wadley House at Littleworth in Faringdon, Berkshire (now Oxfordshire), grandson of Sir Willoughby Aston, Bart., and great-grandson of Sir Thomas Aston, the first of the Aston baronets. The Astons derived their name from Aston in Cheshire, where the family had been settled since the time of Henry II. His mother, Elizabeth, was a daughter of John Warren, Esq., of Oxfordshire.

== Career ==
The date Aston began practicising as a barrister is unclear but his name appears in the first volume of Sir James Burrow's Reports of Cases in the King's Bench (1756–1758). He became King's Counsel in 1759 and Lord Chief Justice of the Court of Common Pleas in Ireland in 1761 after Sir William Yorke's resignation. In 1765, after Sir Thomas Denison, a judge of the King's Bench in England, resigned, Aston gave up his post in Ireland to return to the English court. At this time, he was knighted.

In 1768, Aston was a member of Lord Mansfield's court and was among those who judged the conviction of John Wilkes for the publication of two seditious libels in Essay on Woman and in issue 45 of The North Briton. Wilkes argued that the charges, which branded him an outlaw, were unlawful and, on certain technical grounds, invalid. Aston, along with Joseph Yates and John Willes, found that the language on Wilkes' writ was indeed incomplete. The court agreed that it was invalid. Because the grounds of the writ's dismissal were so technical, rumors spread among Wilkes' detractors that he had bribed Willes and Aston with lottery tickets, and that Aston had been seen selling them at the Royal Exchange. On 20 January 1770, after Charles Yorke's death by suicide, the Rockingham administration selected Aston, Sidney Stafford Smythe, and Henry Bathurst as commissioners. Because the three judges had no experience with chancery law, they made enough mistakes that, one year after their appointment, they returned the Great Seal. Back in Lord Mansfield's court, Aston helped sentence John Horne Tooke for seditious libel in 1777.

Aston worked to reform legal practice after learning that grand juries regularly made decisions about bills of indictment after viewing only the deposition and not speaking with witnesses. His colleagues mostly disapproved of his work. In 1816, nearly 40 years after Aston's death, a bill making the examination of witnesses obligatory was introduced into the House of Commons by Francis Horner and passed into law.

== Personal life ==
Aston was said to have been a brusque man. He was married twice, first to Miss Elred, then to Rebecca Rowland. He died in 1778 and left no issue to either of his wives.

Legal offices
Preceded by Sir William Yorke, 1st Baronet	Chief Justice of the Irish Common Pleas; 1761–65	Succeeded by Richard Clayton
