= West Alvington =

Village in Devon, England

Coordinates: 50°16′N 3°49′W

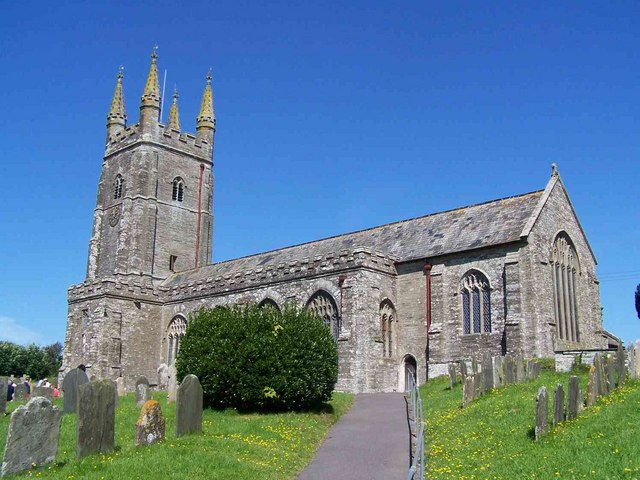
- All Saints, West Alvington

- Location within Devon
- Population: 606 (2021 census)
- Civil parish: West Alvington
- District: South Hams
- Shire county: Devon
- Region: South West
- Country: England
- Sovereign state: United Kingdom

West Alvington is a village and civil parish on the outskirts of Kingsbridge in South Hams, Devon on the A381 road. In 2021 the parish had a population of 606. The appropriate electoral ward is called Westville and Alvington. Its population at the 2011 census was 2,042. It has a primary school and is about a 10-minute walk from the centre of Kingsbridge.

== History ==
It was originally part of the manor of Bowringsleigh, which took its name from the Bowring family, who were lords of the manor from about 1330 to the early sixteenth century. At one time, Alvington was part of the Royal Estates; the town of Kingsbridge formed around a bridge which was built in or before the 10th century between the royal estates of Alvington, to the west, and Chillington, to the east, hence giving it the name of Kyngysbrygge ("King's bridge").

== Notable residents ==
- Thomas Bowring of Bowringsleigh (died 1504), Lord Chief Justice of Ireland and the principal local landowner.
- Robert Bowring (died 1514) eldest son of Thomas, MP for Plymouth.
