= Elias de Asshebournham =

Irish judge

- Born: 1290; Dublin
- Died: 1357 or 1358
- Citizenship: Irish
- Occupation: judge

Sir Elias de Asshebournham, or Ellis de Ashbourne (born c. 1290; died 1357 or 1358) was an Irish judge who held the office of Lord Chief Justice of Ireland, and fought a long battle with a rival candidate, Thomas Louth, to retain it. Despite frequent allegations of corruption, and a reputation for violence, for many years he retained the confidence of the English Crown, although he also suffered periods of imprisonment.

== Early life ==
He was born in Dublin, son of Roger de Asshebournham or Ashbourne, Provost of Dublin and Serjeant-at-law, who was highly praised for his services to the English Crown. Elias lived for some years at Mears Ashby in Northamptonshire, where he acquired a reputation for violence which stayed with him throughout his life. He obtained custody of the manor of Mears Ashby in 1319. In 1312 he received a royal pardon for unspecified offences which he had committed in Northamptonshire: these were probably connected with a long-standing feud with the neighbouring FitzWarin family, whose lands and manors he was accused of burning and despoiling. He clearly did not become a reformed character on his return to Ireland in 1311, and later received a further royal pardon for a savage and unprovoked attack on a passing stranger while he was on his way to Dublin.

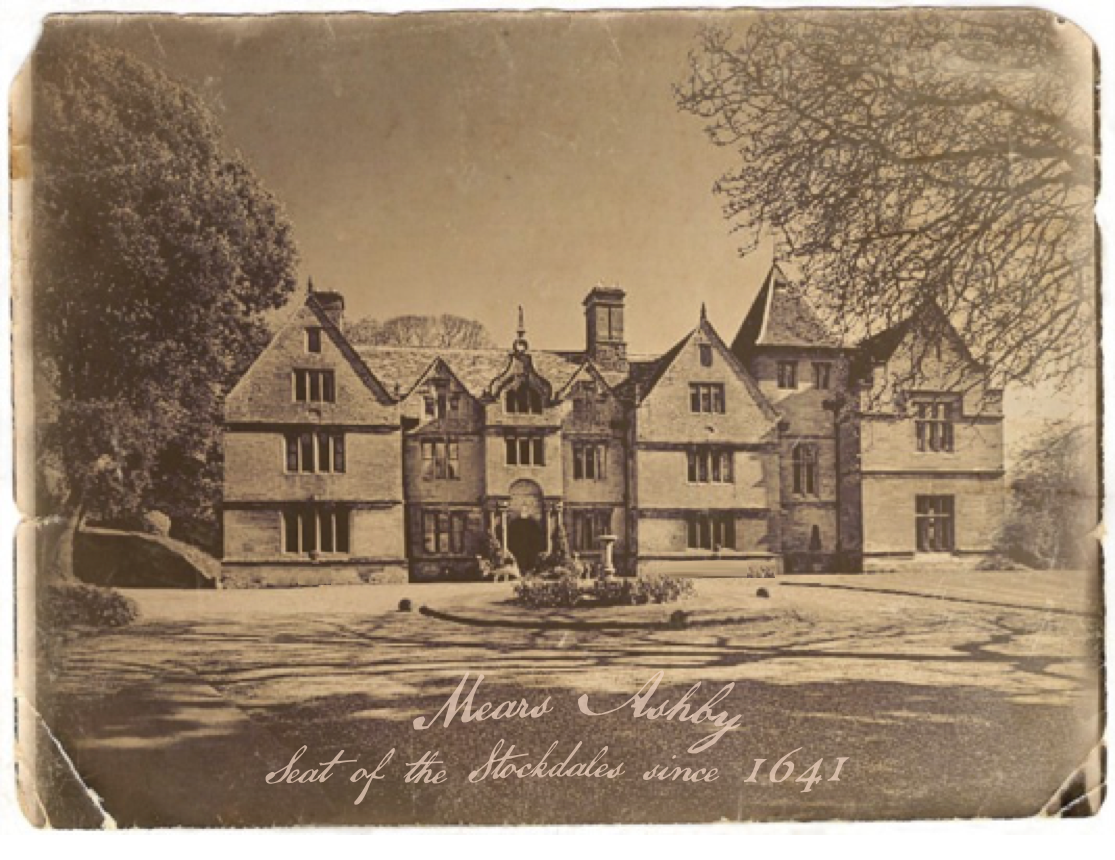
Mears Ashby Hall: Elias lived at Mears Ashby for some years

He spent some time in the household of John Hotham, Bishop of Ely, whose early career was spent in Ireland. He accompanied Hotham to the Papal Court at Avignon in 1316, the mission being concerned largely with Irish Church affairs. He later became a royal servant, and was described as "the King's yeoman": he visited Ireland on the King's business in 1326, apparently in connection with the charges of corruption then pending against Alexander de Bicknor, the Archbishop of Dublin, and Walter de Islip, the Lord Treasurer of Ireland. He received recognition for his own and his father's services to the Crown and was later knighted. He became Seneschal of Swords and Finglas, and Marshal of the eyre of County Meath.

== Judge ==
In 1327 he was appointed second justice of the Court of King's Bench (Ireland), with a salary of 40 marks a year. In 1330 he was made Lord Chief Justice, but soon began a lengthy struggle with Thomas Louth who also claimed the right to hold the office of Chief Justice: the two men replaced each other so often that there is considerable confusion as to who was acting as Chief Justice at any given time. It is known that the English Crown had concerns about the poor quality of the Irish-born judges, so that Louth, as an Englishman, should have had the advantage in the contest; but Elias, a royal servant of long standing, also had influence at Court and was ultimately confirmed in office in 1338.

== Disgrace ==
He resigned from office as Lord Chief Justice in 1341. He was appointed constable of Arklow Castle, but subsequently quarrelled with Edward III, who, despite Elias's long service to the Crown, had become disillusioned with his greed and corruption. He was imprisoned for a time in Dublin Castle, put in chains, and suffered forfeiture of his chattels, and his lands at Stackallen, County Meath. There seems to have been a proposal to send him to England to face trial there, to which he strongly objected, arguing forcefully that if the offences he was charged with had been committed in Ireland, as they clearly had, then only an Irish jury was competent to try him. His disgrace was not permanent, and he was a free man again by 1346. He did not recover Stackallen, which remained in the Crown's hands until 1410, when it was regranted to John Fitzadam, the Chief Justice of the Irish Common Pleas, in consideration of his long and faithful service to the Crown.

== Death and family ==
He was still alive in 1353: he died in relative obscurity in 1357 or 1358. He endowed five chaplains in Saint Laud's Chapel, Christ Church Cathedral, Dublin. His wife was named Elizabeth: they had three children, including Thomas and Anne, who married Robert Luttrell of Luttrellstown. He owned an estate called Colcott, which is thought to have been part of modern-day Simmonscourt, County Dublin. In 1358 his son Thomas petitioned the Crown for restoration of his father's estates, which had reverted to the Crown on his death.

Legal offices
Preceded by Nicholas Fastolf	Lord Chief Justice of Ireland; 1330-31	Succeeded by Peter Tilliol
Preceded by Thomas Louth	Lord Chief Justice of Ireland; 1337	Succeeded by Thomas Louth
Preceded by Thomas Louth	Lord Chief Justice of Ireland; 1337-38	Succeeded by Thomas Louth
Preceded by Thomas Louth	Lord Chief Justice of Ireland; 1338-41	Succeeded by Thomas de Dent
