= Henry de Hambury =

English judge

Henry de Hambury (fl. 1330), was an English judge who held high judicial office in Ireland, being briefly Lord Chief Justice of Ireland.

Henry was a son of Geoffrey de Hambury of Hambury or Hanbury, Worcestershire. Early in life, he became an adherent of Thomas, Earl of Lancaster, but received a royal pardon with the consent of Parliament at York for all felonies in that regard on 1 November 1318. In 1324 he was appointed a justice of the Court of Common Pleas (Ireland).

He was promoted in the following year to be a judge of the Court of King's Bench (Ireland), and almost immediately afterwards to be Lord Chief Justice of Ireland; but in 1326 Richard de Willoughby was appointed Chief Justice, and Hambury returned to the Common Pleas. In 1327 he appears to have been Chief Justice of the Irish Common Pleas, when he was transferred to England, and in 1328 became a judge of the English Court of King's Bench He also was appointed to hold pleas of forest in Gloucestershire, Somersetshire, Dorsetshire, Wiltshire, and South Hampshire.

He seems to have retired before 1338, as the 'Liberate Roll' does not mention him as a judge in that year, but he was still alive in 1352, when he is named in the herald's visitation of Worcestershire, in which county he had become possessed of the abbey of Bordesley in 1324. He founded a chantry at Hambury in 1346.

Legal offices
Preceded by Nicholas Fastolf	Lord Chief Justice of the King's Bench for Ireland; 1327-28	Succeeded by Nicholas Fastolf
