= William Fauvel =

William Fauvel, or Flauvel (died 1339) was an English judge and Crown official of the fourteenth century, part of whose career was spent in Ireland. Despite his previous eminence as a judge, he died in prison in England while awaiting sentence for murder.

== Background ==
He was a Yorkshire man with strong links to the town of Skipton. He was the son of Constantine Fauvel or Flauvel of Skipton: Constantine was a close relative, probably a younger son, of Everard Fauvel (died 1307) who held, as tenant-in-chief from the English Crown, substantial lands at Skipton, Thoralby and Broughton. William had at least one brother: he was married but had no children.

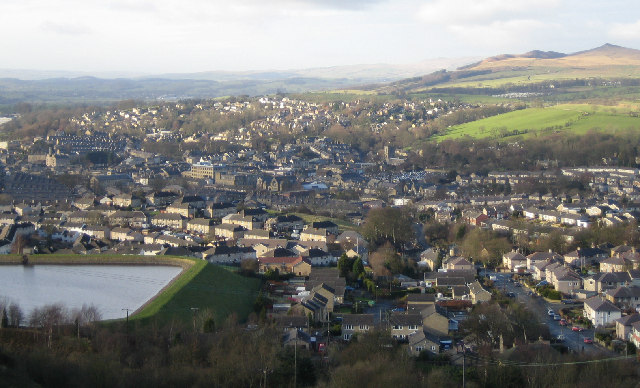
Skipton

== Career ==
Apart from his time serving as a judge in Ireland, William lived mainly in York, where he was residing in 1327. He served as a justice of the Court of Common Pleas (Ireland) from 1329 to about 1332, and then returned to England. He served there as a tax collector, and in 1332 he was employed by the Crown to levy a tax in Westmorland for an unspecified "Irish business". From his family's petition after his death it seems that he held substantial lands in Yorkshire, probably inherited from his father and grandfather.

He was back in York by the summer of 1334, when the Close Rolls record that he admitted to being indebted in a sum of 100 marks to Robert de Clifford, to be charged on his lands in default of repayment. Robert de Clifford was probably Robert Clifford, 3rd Baron Clifford (died 1344), whose principal seat was at Skipton.

== Conviction for murder and death ==
According to the Registers of the Archdiocese of York, he died in the Archbishop of York's prison, a convicted murderer, in 1339. He had been charged with assisting in the killing of one Cheston Fish, who is described as an "approver", i.e. a person guilty of felony who turns Crown informer against his co-accused. Presumably Fauvel was one of those against whom Cheston was prepared to testify (Cheston was in York gaol, probably awaiting trial, at the time of his killing). The details of the felony of which Fauvel was suspected are not known. In that violent age, cases of felony and even murder were not uncommon among members of the ruling class. Some of those found guilty, like Fauvel himself, pleaded benefit of clergy, while others obtained a royal pardon.

Fauvel was "appealed" (found guilty) of murder. He pleaded benefit of clergy, and was delivered to the custody of the Archbishop, William Melton, but died in the Archbishop's prison before the matter was resolved. His brother and his widow petitioned for the return of his lands. The Archbishop ordered the Sheriff of Yorkshire, Sir Ralph Hastings (died 1346), to restore the lands to their rightful owner, without specifying who this was.

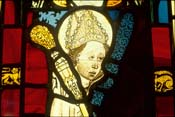
William Melton, Archbishop of York 1317-40

== Sources ==
- Ball, F. Elrington The Judges in Ireland 1221-1921 London John Murray 1926
- Close Rolls Edward III June 1334
- Farrar, William and Clay, Charles Travis ed. Early Yorkshire Charters: Vol.7, The Honour of Skipton Cambridge University Press 2013
- York Archbishops' Registers 25/1/1339 National Archives
