= John Gernoun =

Irish judge

John Gernoun, or Gernon (died c. 1357) was an Irish landowner, soldier and judge who held office as Serjeant-at-law (Ireland) and Chief Justice of the Irish Common Pleas. He gave good service to the Crown during the Scottish Invasion of 1315-18, but as a judge, he was accused of injustice.

== Gernoun family ==
He claimed descent from the de Gernon family, who are described as "barons" in the Domesday Book. His father Roger Gernoun was a military commander who distinguished himself during the Bruce campaign in Ireland of 1315–1318. John also fought in the campaign and was wounded in the hand at the Battle of Faughart in October 1318, where Edward Bruce was killed.

John was probably born in Louth: he later owned land in Dundalk. The Gernoun family had strong links to that county and gave their name to Gernonstown, an area with which John retained strong links, and where his descendants lived in the following century. Several members of the Gernoun family held the office of High Sheriff of Louth between the fourteenth and seventeenth centuries. Richard Gernon, High Sheriff of County Louth, was murdered in 1311, a casualty of a long-running feud between the Gernouns and the prominent Brisbon family of Dundalk. It is not clear if the judge was related to the wealthy English landowner John Gernoun, who died in 1384.

== Early career ==
Our first record of John is his petition of 1320 to King Edward II of England to have the fishery of Gernonstown, from the river to the sea, granted to him for life. He pleads that this is a proper reward for his good service to the Crown and in particular his actions during the Scots Invasion at the Battle of Faughart, in which he was wounded. The petition was referred to the King personally, and was granted.

He was in England in the 1320s, presumably studying law (Ireland then had no law school); but he was back in Ireland by 1327 when he became King's Serjeant (or "King's Pleader" as the office was generally known then). He was described as Second Serjeant, with a salary of 5 marks a year. He served two terms as Serjeant, from 1327 to 1330 and from 1334 to 1337. In the intervals he acted as attorney for the great heiress Elizabeth de Burgh, 4th Countess of Ulster, who had inherited her father's estates at an early age. Her mother Maud of Lancaster, a cousin of King Edward III, had considerable influence at Court, and Gernoun benefited from her patronage. He was a substantial landowner in County Louth and, as was the custom with judges in this era, he was excused from performing the normal feudal duties of a landowner.

== Judge ==
He was appointed a justice of the Court of Common Pleas (Ireland) in 1338 and became its Chief Justice in 1341. He stepped down as Chief Justice in 1344 but was reappointed second justice of the Common Pleas in 1348. As Chief Justice there were complaints that he would adjourn cases without reaching a final judgment. In 1345 one John de la Pulle, accused of assault by Margery Poe, complained that due to Gernoun's misconduct (described as the "intervention of error"), he could not get justice. Gernoun's successor as Chief Justice, Thomas de Dent, was ordered to make a full inquiry and report to the Justiciar of Ireland.

In 135O he gave a quitclaim to John de Kerseley for all his tenements in Dundalk; de Kerseley paid him 100 shillings in return. He probably died in 1357.

== Marriage and descendants ==
He married, probably before 1330, Matilda, widow of William de Nottingham (son of the long-serving Lord Mayor of Dublin, Robert de Nottingham and his wife Loretta de Bree). After Gernoun's death, she remarried his colleague John Keppock. She and Gernoun had a son, John. In 1350, possibly on his coming of age, they granted him their messuages (dwelling houses) and lands at Ardee and Mullanstown, County Louth. John Gernoun of Gernonstown, who received a royal pardon in 1422, was probably a descendant of the judge.
