= Thomas Bowring =

English-born lawyer and judge

Thomas Bowring (c.1440-1504) was an English-born lawyer and judge in fifteenth-century Ireland, who held office as Lord Chief Justice of Ireland.

He belonged to a prominent landowning family in Devon, who gave their name to the manor of Bowringsleigh, which they acquired about 1330. His main estate was in nearby West Alvington, and he also acquired lands in Somerset and Gloucestershire, which passed on his death to his eldest son.

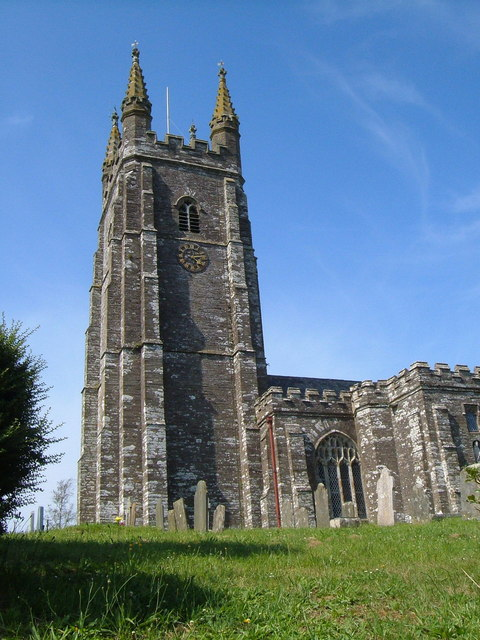
West Alvington - All Saints Church

He was a member of the Middle Temple and had the reputation of being a fine lawyer. He served as a commissioner for the peace in his native county between 1481 and 1487.

In 1494 the temporary downfall of Gerald FitzGerald, 8th Earl of Kildare, who for many years had been almost all-powerful in Ireland, led to the dismissal en masse of the Irish High Court judges, who were regarded by the Crown as being Kildare's puppets, and whose loyalty to the Crown was doubtful (with good reason, as several of them had been pardoned six years earlier for supporting the claim of the pretender Lambert Simnel to the English throne). They were replaced by eminent English lawyers, in whose loyalty the Lord Deputy of Ireland, Sir Edward Poynings, believed that the English Crown could place its trust. Bowring was sent to Ireland as Lord Chief Justice. Two years later he exchanged this place for the less onerous office of Chief Justice of the Irish Common Pleas. In 1495, on the King's instructions, he confirmed the charters and ancient liberty of the city of Kilkenny.

Soon afterwards, the Earl of Kildare was restored to royal favour and was once more allowed to appoint his own men to judicial office. Bowring, who had not been happy in Ireland, and was said to be "unable to accommodate himself to Irish ideas", gladly resigned from the Irish Bench and returned to Devon, where he continued to serve in various official capacities until his death in 1504.

He was married twice, and by his first wife had three children:

- Robert (died 1514), MP for Plymouth;
- Ralph, who inherited the family estates after the death of Robert's only daughter, Thomasin, in 1518;
- Alice, who married William Pyke.

His second wife was Agnes Kelloway, daughter of William Kelloway of Sherborne and widow of Thomas Pomeroy of Berry Pomeroy; she died in 1518.

== Footnotes ==
Legal offices
Preceded by Thomas Cusacke	Lord Chief Justice of Ireland; 1494–1496	Succeeded by John Topcliffe
