= John Chevir =

Irish judge and politician

John Chevir or Chevyr (c. 1410 – 1474) was an Irish judge and politician of the fifteenth century. He held the offices of Lord Chief Justice of Ireland and Master of the Rolls in Ireland, and was also one of the first recorded Speakers of the Irish House of Commons.

== Family ==
He was born in Kilkenny, a younger son of John Chevir senior, justice of the peace for County Kilkenny. The family were descended from Sir William Chevre (living 1174) who settled in County Wexford after the Anglo-Norman invasion of Ireland, and witnessed the foundation charter for Tintern Abbey, County Wexford. John was the younger brother of William Chevir (died 1446) who also had a successful, if somewhat turbulent, political and judicial career. William held office as a judge of the Court of King's Bench (Ireland), Deputy Treasurer of Ireland and Deputy to the Lord Chancellor of Ireland.

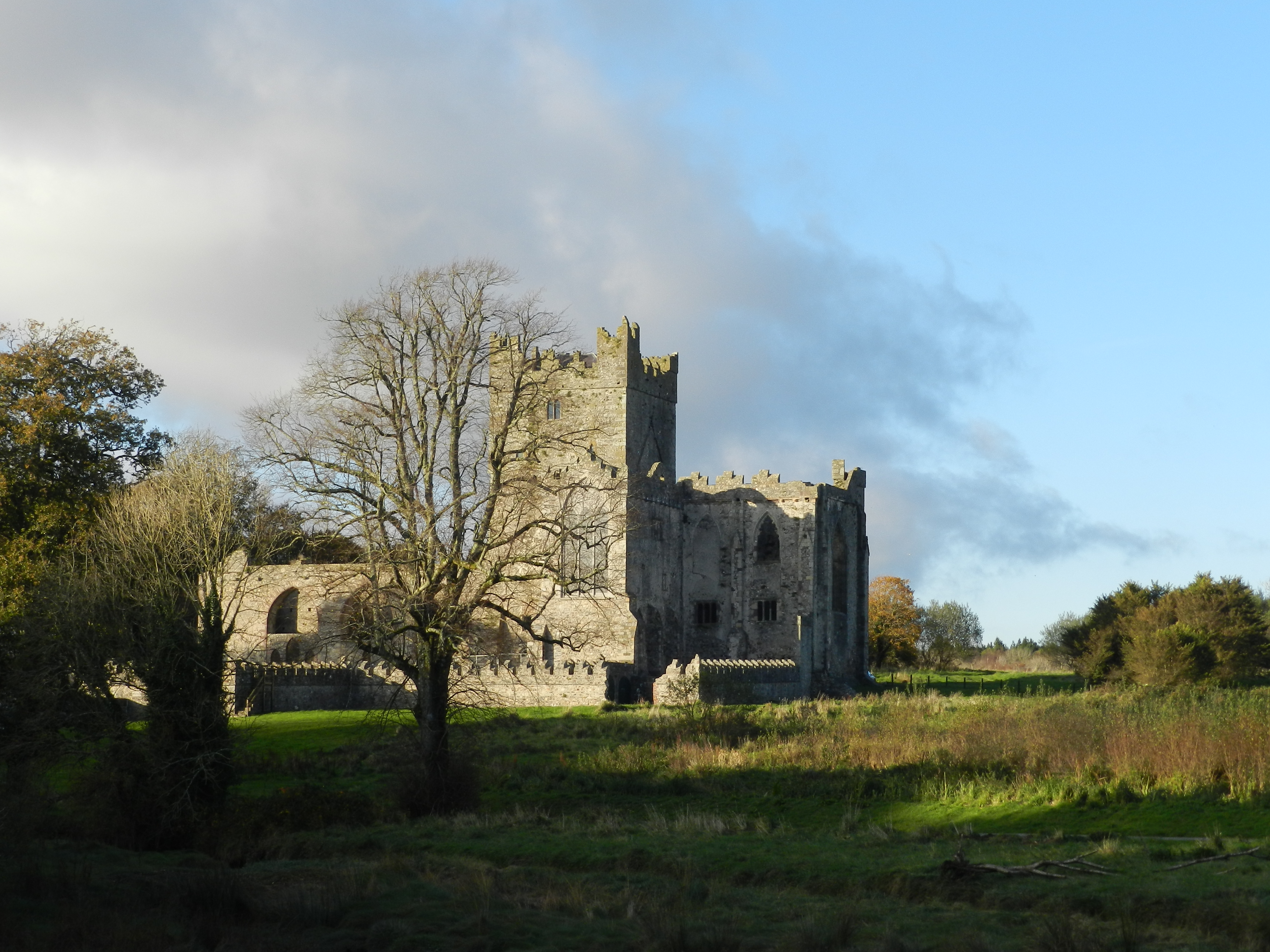
Tintern Abbey, County Wexford

== Career ==
John was studying law at Lincoln's Inn in 1442. A few years afterwards he was acting as legal adviser to James Butler, 4th Earl of Ormonde, in London. He returned to Ireland before 1450. John and his brother were strong supporters of the Earl of Ormonde's faction, which was one of the two main parties in Irish politics in the 1430s and 1440s.

He was appointed Master of the Rolls in 1450; this was then a less important office than it became later, its duties being administrative rather than judicial. It was clearly a part-time office since he was returned to the Irish House of Commons at the same time and was one of its first known Speakers. The Parliament of 1453-4 ordered him to appear before them with certain records of Parliament which they believed had been placed in the Master's custody. He was originally appointed a judge "so long as he was of good behaviour", an increasingly common formula for judges' tenure, but was later confirmed in office for life. In 1458 he was given royal licence to endow a chantry "with one or two chaplains".

The Parliament of 1463 passed an Act restoring to him the mill and watercourse at Esker, which had originally been granted to him in 1450, on his appointment as Master. These were attached to the manor of Esker near Lucan, Dublin, a Crown property which was often leased to public servants for their lifetimes. In 1453 he was made joint guardian of the wealthy minor Thomas Fitzwilliam of Dundrum, Dublin.

In 1468 he was appointed joint Lord Chief Justice with Sir Thomas Fitz-Christopher Plunket and became the sole Chief Justice in 1471. He remained in office until his death in 1474 (he was dead by the end of June when his successor was appointed). In 1468 he witnessed a grant to the town authorities of Drogheda for maintenance of the town walls, bridges and defences. His last public act was to witness the charter establishing the Dublin Smith's Guild. He left part of his estate to his successor in office, Philip Bermingham, who was probably a relation by marriage.

He married Anne Bermingham, who outlived him. Given his unusual surname (which is thought to be the original form of Cheever) it is probable that they were the parents of John Chevir, a merchant of Dublin, who in 1479 was one of those permitted by Edward IV to build a chantry at the Church of St. Nicholas Without, Dublin, following his father's example.

Legal offices
Preceded by Thomas Fitz-Christopher Plunket	Lord Chief Justice of Ireland; 1468–1474	Succeeded by Philip Bermingham
