= Thomas Cusacke =

Irish barrister and judge

Thomas Cusacke, Cusack or de Cusack (died c.1496) was an Irish barrister and judge, who held the offices of Attorney General for Ireland and Lord Chief Justice of Ireland. He should not be confused with his much younger cousin Sir Thomas Cusack, Lord Chancellor of Ireland, who was a child of about six when the elder Thomas died.

Elrington Ball states that he belonged to a junior branch of the well-known landowning Cusack family of County Meath, who were living at Gerrardstown as early as the late thirteenth century: Geoffrey de Cusack was Lord of Gerrardstown in 1295. The Cusacks were a numerous family, but Thomas was most likely a younger son of Sir Walter Cusack, who was Coroner for Meath in 1450.

He was a cousin of John Cusack of Cushinstown: John was the father of the Lord Chancellor, Sir Thomas Cusack, and ancestor, through his granddaughter Catherine Colley (née Catherine Cusack-Wellesley) of the Duke of Wellington.

Thomas is first heard of in London in 1472, when he was a law student: he went to London, in his own words: "so as to thoroughly ground himself in the King's law", and he was given a licence to import grain into Ireland. He was appointed Attorney General for Ireland in 1480. He was not as far as is known the Thomas Cusack who was Recorder of Dublin in 1488: Cusack was also a fairly common name in Dublin.

Like nearly all the senior Irish judges in that era, he was a client of Gerald FitzGerald, 8th Earl of Kildare, who was almost all-powerful in Ireland for more than 30 years. Kildare and his faction made the mistake of supporting the claims of Lambert Simnel, a pretender to the English Crown, who was decisively defeated at the Battle of Stoke Field in 1487. The victorious King Henry VII was merciful to the Irish rebels (as indeed he was to Simnel himself, who became a servant in the Royal household). He issued a royal pardon to the great majority of the rebels, including Cusacke, who became Lord Chief Justice in 1490, and his namesake the Recorder.

Henry's policy of clemency had its limits, and his strong suspicion that at least some of the Anglo-Irish nobility were aiding another pretender to the Throne, Perkin Warbeck, led to Kildare's temporary downfall in 1494. The new Lord Deputy of Ireland, Sir Edward Poynings, undertook a general purge of the Irish judges, including Cusacke, who was replaced by the eminent English lawyer Thomas Bowring.

From 1496 onwards Kildare regained much of his influence. Some of his former allies on the bench returned to office, but no more is heard of Cusacke, which suggests that he had died sometime between 1494 and 1496.

== Sources ==
- Ball, F. Elrington The Judges in Ireland 1221-1921 John Murray London 1926
- Burke's Landed Gentry of Great Britain and Ireland London Henry Colburn 1850
- Burke's Peerage 107th edition Delaware 2003
- Longford, Elizabeth Wellington- the Years of the Sword Weidenfeld & Nicolson London 1969

Legal offices
Preceded by Philip Bermingham	Lord Chief Justice of Ireland; 1490–1494	Succeeded by Thomas Bowring
