= John Topcliffe =

English-born judge

John Topcliffe (died 1513) was an English-born judge who spent much of his career in Ireland, where he held office as Chief Justice of each of the three courts of common law in turn.

== Background ==
His family took their name from Topcliffe, North Yorkshire, a locality with which he retained close links all his life. It was John who built Topcliffe Hall, a substantial manor house which had largely disappeared by the nineteenth century, and he probably died there.

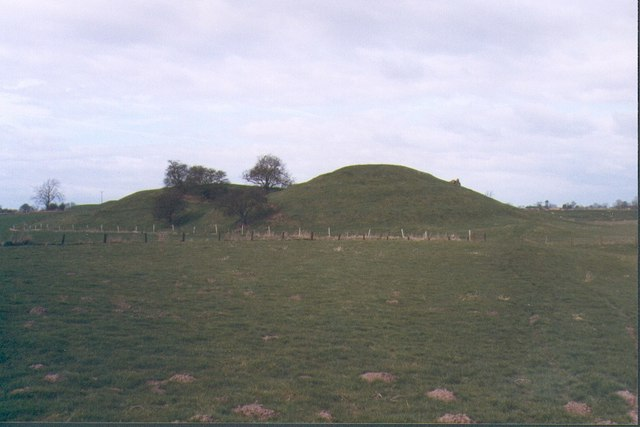
Topcliffe, North Yorkshire, the judge's birthplace

== Career ==
He qualified as a proctor (i.e. a lawyer qualified to practice in the ecclesiastical courts), but little more is known of his legal career until 1494 when he was sent to Ireland as Chief Justice of the Irish Common Pleas, at the request of Sir Edward Poynings, the Lord Deputy of Ireland. This was part of a wider policy of replacing Irish judges, whose loyalty to the Tudor dynasty was suspect, with Englishmen. Two years later he served briefly as Chief Baron of the Irish Exchequer before becoming Lord Chief Justice of Ireland later the same year "at the King's pleasure". His patent was renewed several times by Henry VII and he was continued in office by Henry VIII, which suggests that the Crown had great confidence in his ability. Henry VII, who was as a rule exceptionally parsimonious, ordered that his arrears of salary be paid in 1504, and Henry VIII made him a gift of £40 (equivalent to one year's salary). Payment was to be partly out of Court fees and fines, and partly out of the customs of the port of Dublin. He was also appointed Master of the Irish Mint, and an officer of the Royal Household.

In 1498, following the enactment of Poynings' Law, Topcliffe was sent to England to seek leave for the holding of an Irish Parliament, which was duly granted.

== Letter to Henry VIII ==
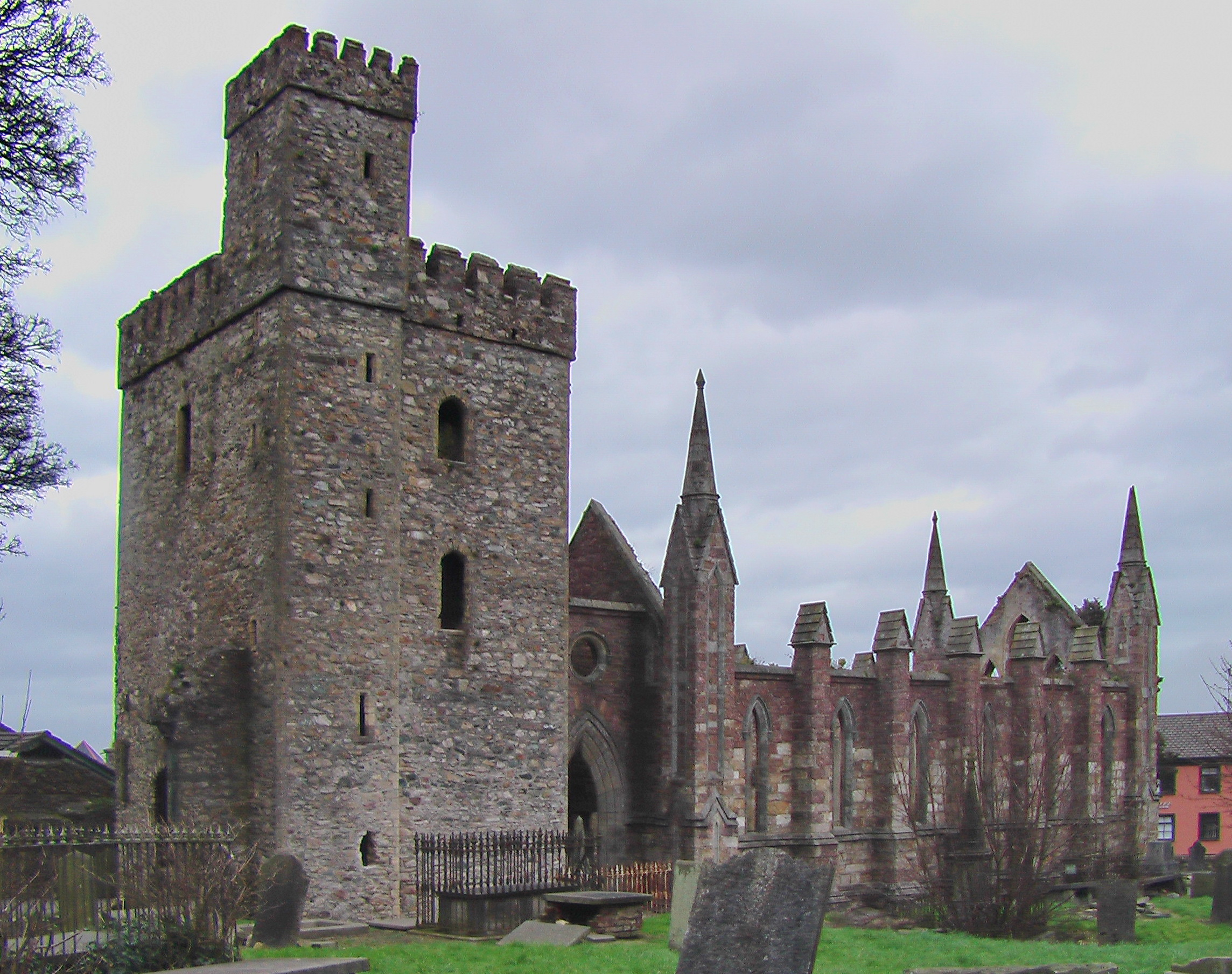
Selskar Abbey

In 1511 Topcliffe, who was visiting England, wrote to Henry VIII about the affairs of Selskar Abbey, a house of Augustinian canons in Wexford. Elrington Ball thought that the letter was worth quoting in detail, both because of the glimpse it gives us of Topcliffe's personality and because few other private papers of the Irish judiciary from this time have survived.

Topcliffe explained that since the Abbey's foundation the canons had chosen their own prior. After the last election, however, the Abbot had expelled the "good blessed religious father and prior" who had been the choice of the canons and had the approval of the town authorities also. Topcliffe argued that such defiance of the wishes of the community could not be permitted, or, he warned, "the service of God will not continue". It is unknown whether or not the King replied to this letter. He certainly had no affection for Selskar Abbey, which was suppressed in 1542 during the Dissolution of the Monasteries.

== Death and memorial ==
Topcliffe died in 1513, apparently at Topcliffe, since he was buried in the nearby church of St. Mary's, Woodkirk. His tombstone recorded his name, offices and date of death, and the usual request that the viewer prays for his soul. It was still clearly visible in 1830, but the local historian William Smith, writing in 1888, noted that renovations to the Church (which were described as "sheer vandalism" by critics) had largely obliterated it.

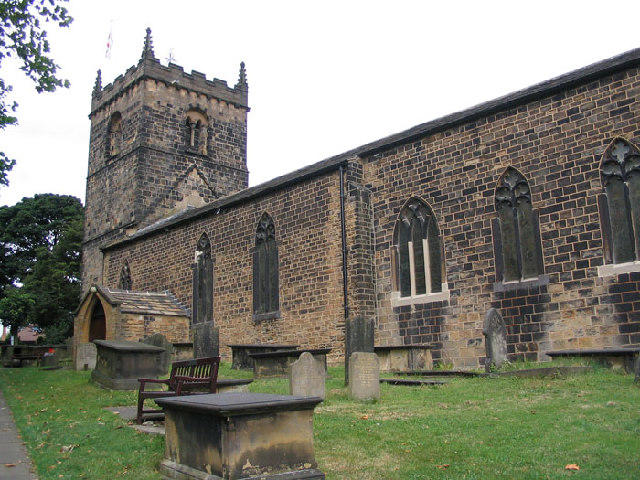
Woodkirk Church, where Topcliffe is buried

He was married, though little appears to be known about his wife. He had one daughter and heiress Rose, who in 1512 married Richard Bunny of Bunny Hall, Wakefield (died 1535). They had issue, including the younger Richard Bunny MP (died 1584), who was a political figure of some importance in the north of England in the reign of Elizabeth I, despite a reputation for corruption and mismanagement of Crown funds.

== Character ==
Local historian William Smith regarded Topcliffe as "a notable personality", and there is no doubt that he enjoyed the confidence of two successive Kings of England. By contrast, Elrington Ball, who admittedly was depending on the evidence of the judge's single known letter to Henry VIII, thought him a simple and pious man, of no great legal ability or strength of character.

Legal offices
Preceded by Thomas Bowring	Lord Chief Justice of Ireland; 1496–1513	Succeeded by Patrick Bermingham
