= Henry Singleton (judge) =

Irish politician and judge

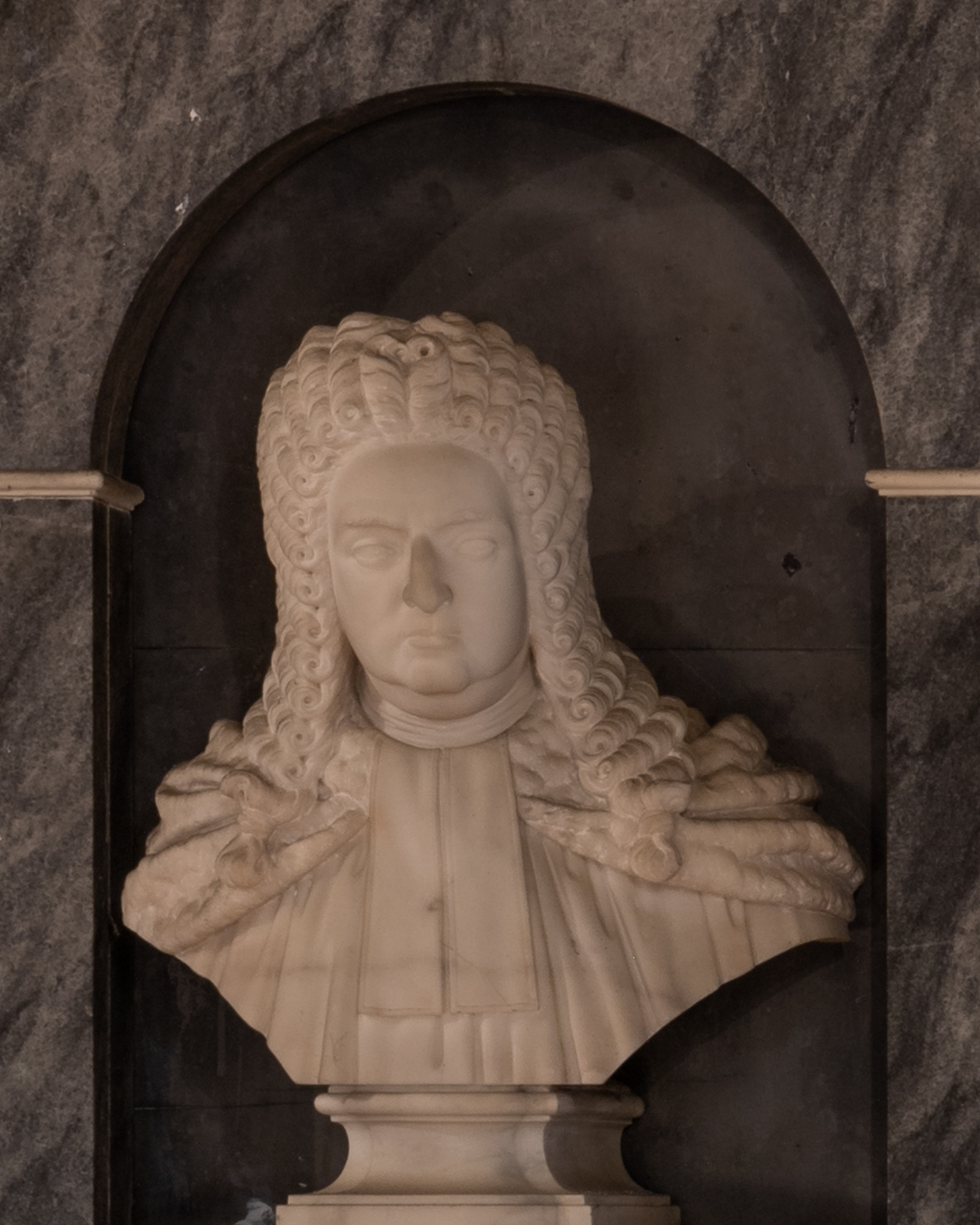
Bust sculpted by John Hickey in 1787

Henry Singleton (1682–1759) was an Irish politician and judge, who is remembered now mainly for his friendship with Jonathan Swift, and for his notable acts of charity during the Great Irish Famine of 1740-1, in which between 300,000 and 500,000 people (possibly 20% of the overall population) died. Singleton House, his impressive townhouse in Drogheda, no longer exists.

== Career ==
=== Politician ===
He was born in Drogheda, one of eleven children of Edward Singleton, Member of Parliament for Drogheda town and his wife Catherine Newton. He went to school in Drogheda Grammar School, graduated from Trinity College Dublin, entered the Inner Temple and was called to the Bar in 1707. Like his father, he sat in the Irish House of Commons as MP for Drogheda and was a close associate of the foremost Parliamentary "manager", William Conolly. He narrowly missed becoming Speaker of the House in 1733, apparently, because he was considered to be a Tory in the era of the "Whig triumph". This disappointment is said to have caused him to lose interest in politics. He was also Recorder of Drogheda from 1708, and became Prime Serjeant-at-law in 1726. He evidently found the office of Serjeant an onerous one, judging by his later pleas to be appointed to "a place of greater ease". It is interesting that he assumed that the workload of a High Court judge would be lighter than that of the Serjeant. In 1733, Singleton found some support in his campaign as successor of Sir Ralph Gore as Speaker but withdrew when the Duke of Dorset, Lord Lieutenant of Ireland, supported Henry Boyle in 1733.

=== Judge ===
In 1739, when the office of Lord Chancellor of Ireland fell vacant, Singleton lobbied hard for it, arguing that his "fifteen years of faithful service to the Crown" surely entitled him to "a place of more ease, though less profit, than his present situation". There was, however, a traditional reluctance on the part of the English Crown to appoint any Irish-born judge as Lord Chancellor, and he was passed over in favour of Robert Jocelyn, 1st Viscount Jocelyn. Singleton was finally raised to the Bench as Chief Justice of the Irish Common Pleas in 1740, and was praised for bringing "learning and judgment" to that office.

Within a few years his health began to fail, although he made frequent visits to Bath and Spa in the hope of a cure. Despite pressure from William Yorke, his colleague in the Common Pleas and nephew by marriage, who was anxious to succeed him, he was reluctant to step down. Eventually, in 1753 he resigned as Chief Justice; the following year he became Master of the Rolls in Ireland (which was then largely a sinecure rather than the senior judicial office which it became later, although he was said to fill it with "great dignity"). Surprisingly, he was asked to resume his political career in order to support the Government, but it was quickly recognised that he was "too worn out" to play any active role. He appears to have had a stroke shortly afterwards, which severely impaired his speech, and in 1754 he was said to be on the point of death, although he made a partial recovery.

== Death and burial ==
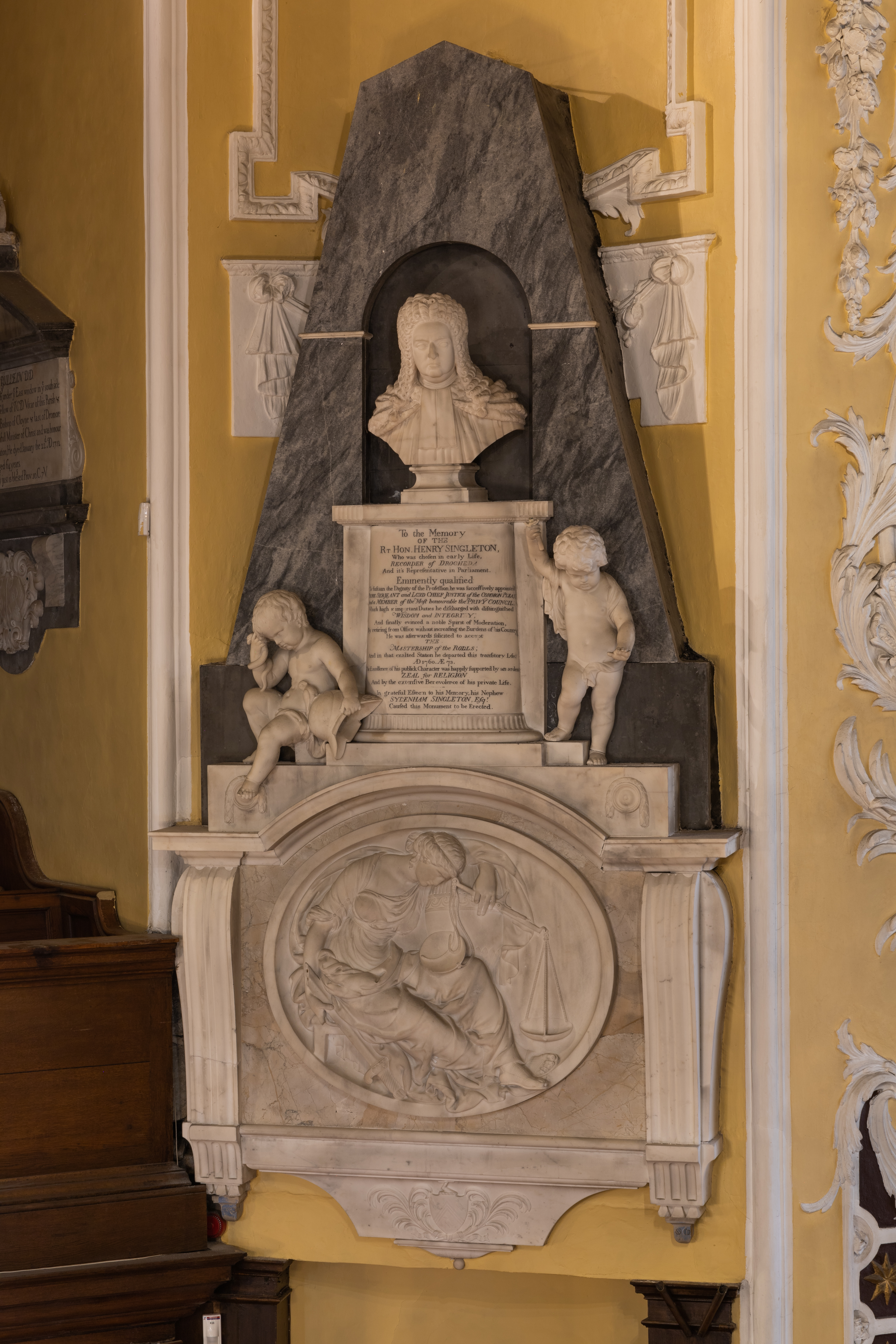
Monument in St. Peter's with the relief of a mourning Iustitia

He held the Mastership until his death, despite ever-increasing health problems which left him in "a melancholy condition". He died unmarried in 1759 and was buried in St. Peter's Church of Ireland, Drogheda, where his nephew Sydenham Singleton erected an impressive monument in his memory, sculpted by John Hickey. His law library is now held by Columbia University.

== Heirs ==
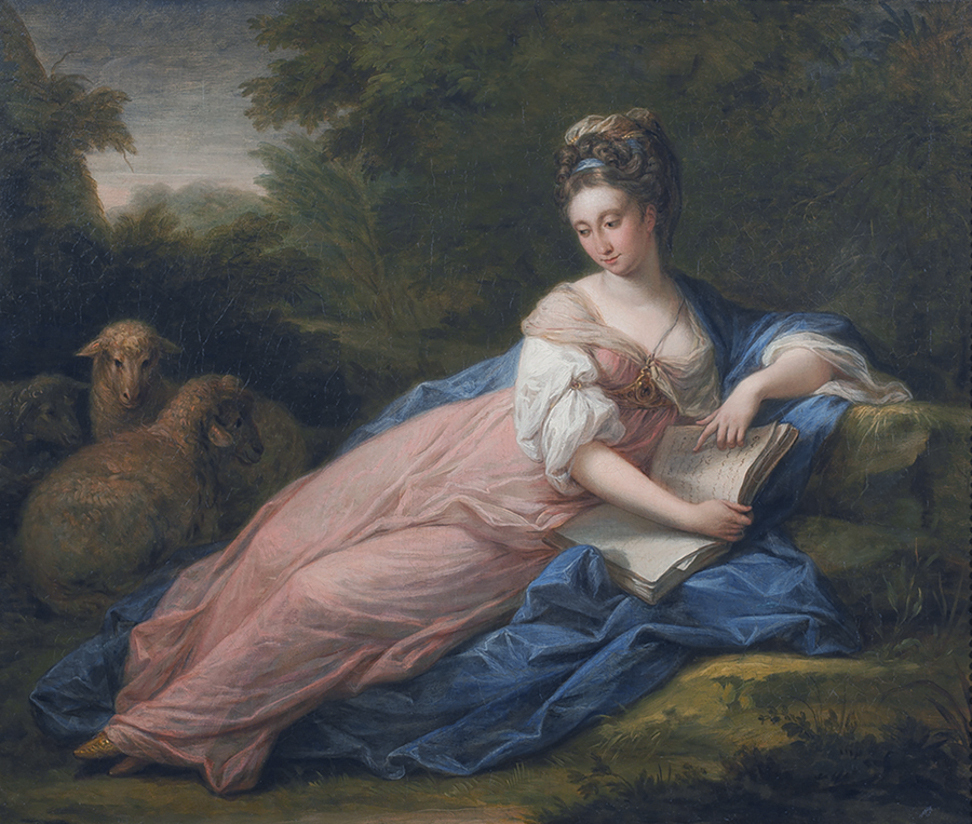
Mary Singleton Tisdall, "la belle Marie", Singleton's niece and main heiress, painted by Angelica Kauffmann

His will contains a long list of bequests to his surviving sisters, and to his numerous nephews and nieces. The principal beneficiary was his niece Mary, daughter of his brother the Rev. Rowland Singleton, vicar of Termonfeckin, and his wife Elizabeth Graham, and sister of Charity Singleton Cope (1707-1779), who married Sir William Yorke as her second husband. Mary married Philip Tisdall, Attorney General for Ireland from 1760 to 1777, who was a dominant figure in the Irish Government for many years. Tisdall hoped to succeed Singleton as Master of the Rolls, but was passed over. Mary ("la belle Marie") was a noted beauty: she and Philip were both painted by the celebrated Swiss painter Angelica Kauffman.

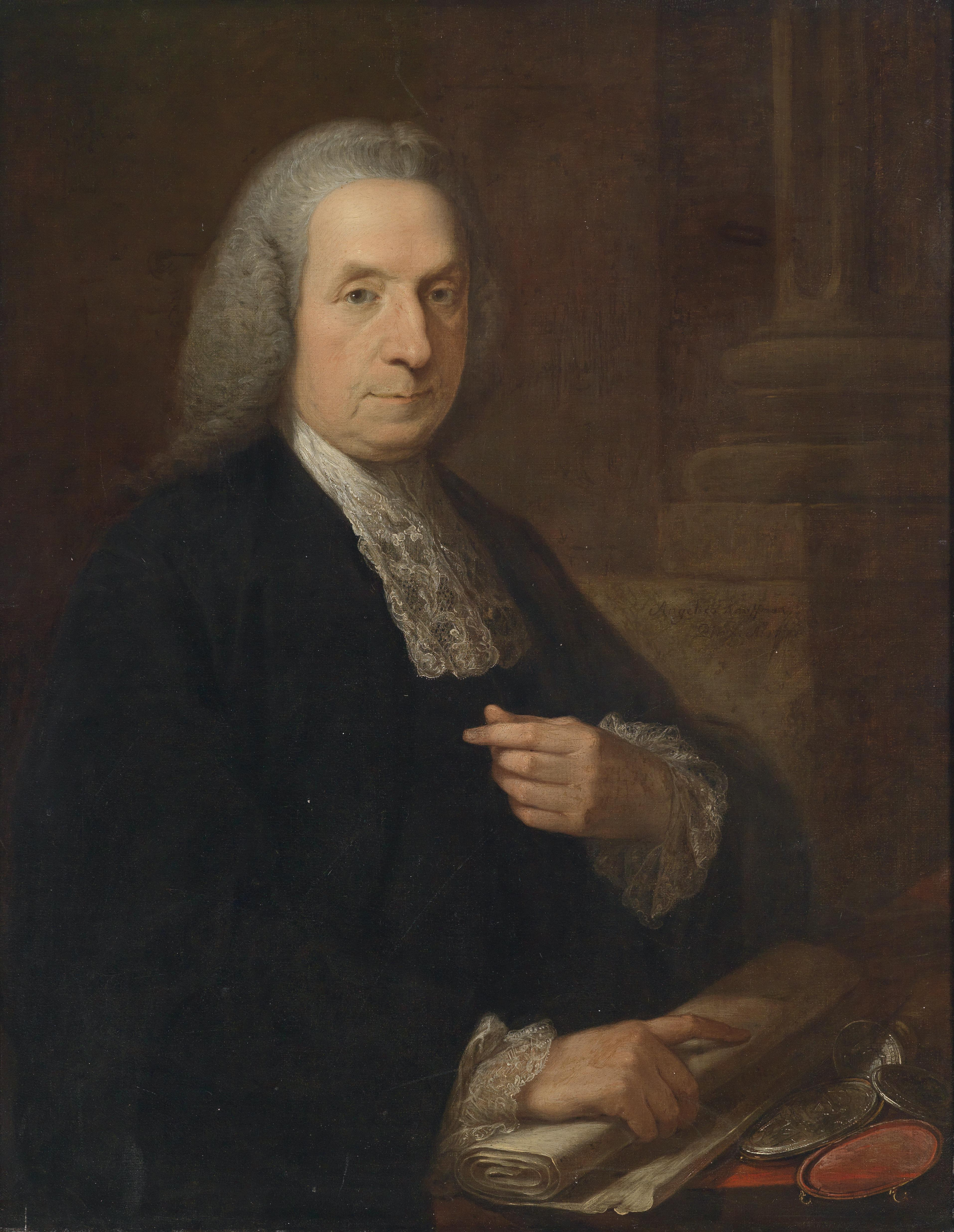
Philipp Tisdall, the leading Irish statesman who married Singleton's niece and heiress Mary Singleton, by Angelica Kauffman

== Residence ==
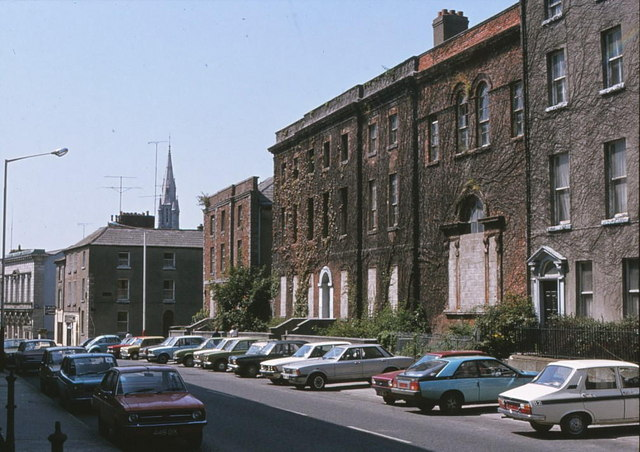
Demolition of Drogheda Grammar School (the east end of Lord Chief Justice Singleton's house), erected in the 1730s and demolished on Sunday 23rd July 1989.

In 1731 he built an impressive residence named Singleton House at Laurence Street, Drogheda. It has been described as a three-storey mansion of red brick, with seven bay windows and magnificent oak-panelled interiors. It became derelict in the 20th century, and was demolished (illegally) in 1989.

In Dublin, he lived at Belvidere House, Drumcondra, which he rented from his friend and political connections colleague Marmaduke Coghill, and which he extensively improved. He also owned property in County Cavan

== Character ==
Despite a rather haughty manner, which led to his nickname "the Prime Serjeant Grand", and is borne out by the portrait of him by Michael Ford in his judicial robes, Singleton was loved and respected by those who knew him well. He enjoyed the friendship of Jonathan Swift who called him "the first of the worthiest" and appointed him his executor. William Yorke, his successor as Chief Justice, and husband of his niece Charity, even while nudging him towards retirement, had nothing but praise for Singleton both as a man and a judge. Another influential friend was the politician and judge Robert Lindsay, who married Henry's sister Elizabeth, and was also a friend of Swift. George Stone, the powerful Archbishop of Armagh, also had high regard for him. The best tribute to his character is his noble behaviour during the Great Famine of 1740-41 when he donated much of his personal fortune to the relief of the poor of Drogheda, one of the towns worst affected by the famine, and adjourned the Court of Common Pleas, so that he could return home and supervise the relief works.

Legal offices
Preceded by James Reynolds	Chief Justice of the Irish Common Pleas; 1740–1753	Succeeded by Sir William Yorke, 1st Baronet
