= Nicholas Fastolf =

English-born judge

Nicholas Fastolf (??? - 1330) was an English-born judge who was a leading member of the early Irish judiciary; according to the most reliable source, he was the first judge to hold the office of Lord Chief Justice of Ireland. He was probably the direct ancestor of Sir John Fastolf, who is generally thought to have inspired Shakespeare's character Falstaff.

== Family ==
He was born in Norfolk, one of the four sons of Thomas Fastolf of Reedham and Great Yarmouth. His brothers were Thomas Fastolf, Bishop of St David's, Lawrence Fastolf, auditor of the prerogative court of Canterbury, and Alexander, who was twice bailiff of Great Yarmouth.

Great Yarmouth, present day

Nicholas' wife was called Cicely or Cecilia: they had several children. Elrington Ball believed that he was the direct ancestor of Sir John Fastolf. Hugh Fastolf, who was MP for Great Yarmouth from 1361 to 1377, is thought to have been his nephew, a son of his brother Alexander.

== Career ==
He served at least one term as bailiff of Great Yarmouth, sat as a burgess for Great Yarmouth in the Parliaments of 1309 and 1314 and became a Serjeant-at-law. In 1324 he was sent to Ireland as Lord Chief Justice. Elrington Ball regarded his appointment as a step of great importance in the development of the Irish judiciary, since, while some sources name Walter l'Enfant, in about 1300, as the first Lord Chief Justice of Ireland, Ball believed that Fastolf was the first. That, however, was not his contemporary title: he was usually referred to as "the justice following the Justiciar of Ireland". He exchanged the position for that of Chief Justice of the Irish Common Pleas in 1328, but returned to his earlier office the following year. His salary was 40 marks a year. As a special favour the Crown promised him the custody of any heir who became a royal ward, and the right to hold his lands during his minority, if the lands were worth less than £20.

He was granted lands in County Meath: in Dublin he lived in considerable state in an impressive mansion on Rochel Street (now Back Lane) near Dublin Castle. He made a special contract with the Mayor of Dublin for a private water supply, which involved inserting a narrow pipe "the width of a goose quill" into the cistern of his neighbour and fellow judge Walter de Islip. He returned to England in 1330, and is heard of there acting as an itinerant justice, but died soon after 1330; his executors were his widow and his brother Lawrence.

Elrington Ball calls him "a man of wealth and distinction".

Legal offices
New creation	Lord Chief Justice of Ireland; 1324-27	Succeeded by Henry de Hambury
Preceded by Henry de Hambury	Lord Chief Justice of Ireland; 1328-30	Succeeded by Elias de Asshebournham
