= Peter Tilliol =

English landowner, politician, and judge

Sir Peter Tilliol, also called Peter de Tilliol (1299-1348) was a Cumberland landowner, politician and judge; he was High Sheriff of Cumberland, and served briefly as Lord Chief Justice of Ireland.

He was born at Scaleby Castle, Cumberland, son of Sir Robert de Tilliol (died 1320) and Maud de Lascelles. The Tilliol family had been granted the lands of Scaleby by Henry I and over the centuries had become one of the leading landowning families in Cumberland. It was Sir Robert who built the Castle sometime after 1307. It was destroyed in its present form during the English Civil War

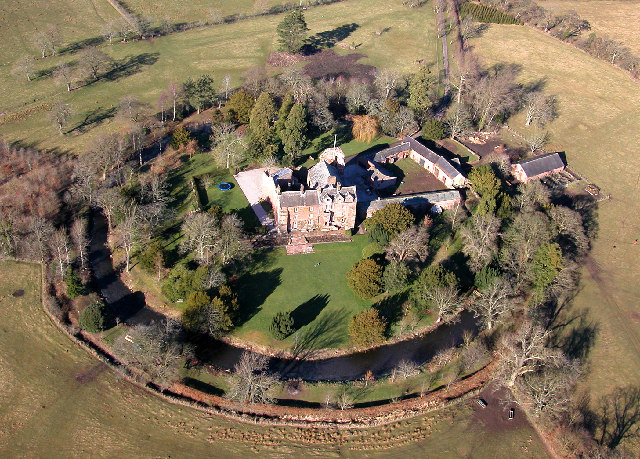
ScalebyCastle, Cumbria, the Tilliol family home for centuries

In 1322 Tilliol saw military service on the Scottish border under the command of Andrew Harclay, 1st Earl of Carlisle; this might well have been politically ruinous since Carlisle's decision to make a peace treaty with the Scots on his own initiative, without royal sanction, led to his downfall and execution for treason in 1323. Tilliol however seems to have escaped unscathed from the affair; he was twice High Sheriff of Cumberland in 1327 and 1329, and represented Cumberland as knight of the shire in the House of Commons of England. He sat regularly as a Commissioner for oyer and terminer, and in 1341 he was given a special commission by Parliament to punish rebels and suppress trespass in Cumberland.

His judicial experience may explain the decision to send him to Ireland as Lord Chief Justice, where two rival office holders Thomas Louth and Elias de Asshebournham spent most of the 1330s disputing their right to the position. Tilliol may have been a compromise candidate; he went to Ireland in the spring of 1331 but returned to England almost at once.

By his wife Isabel, he was the father of Sir Robert de Tilliol; Robert and his son Peter continued the family tradition of serving as High Sheriffs of Cumberland. The male Tilliol line died out in 1435.

Legal offices
Preceded by Elias de Asshebournham	Lord Chief Justice of the King's Bench for Ireland; 1331-32	Succeeded by Thomas Louth
