= Thomas de Dent =

English-born cleric and judge in Ireland

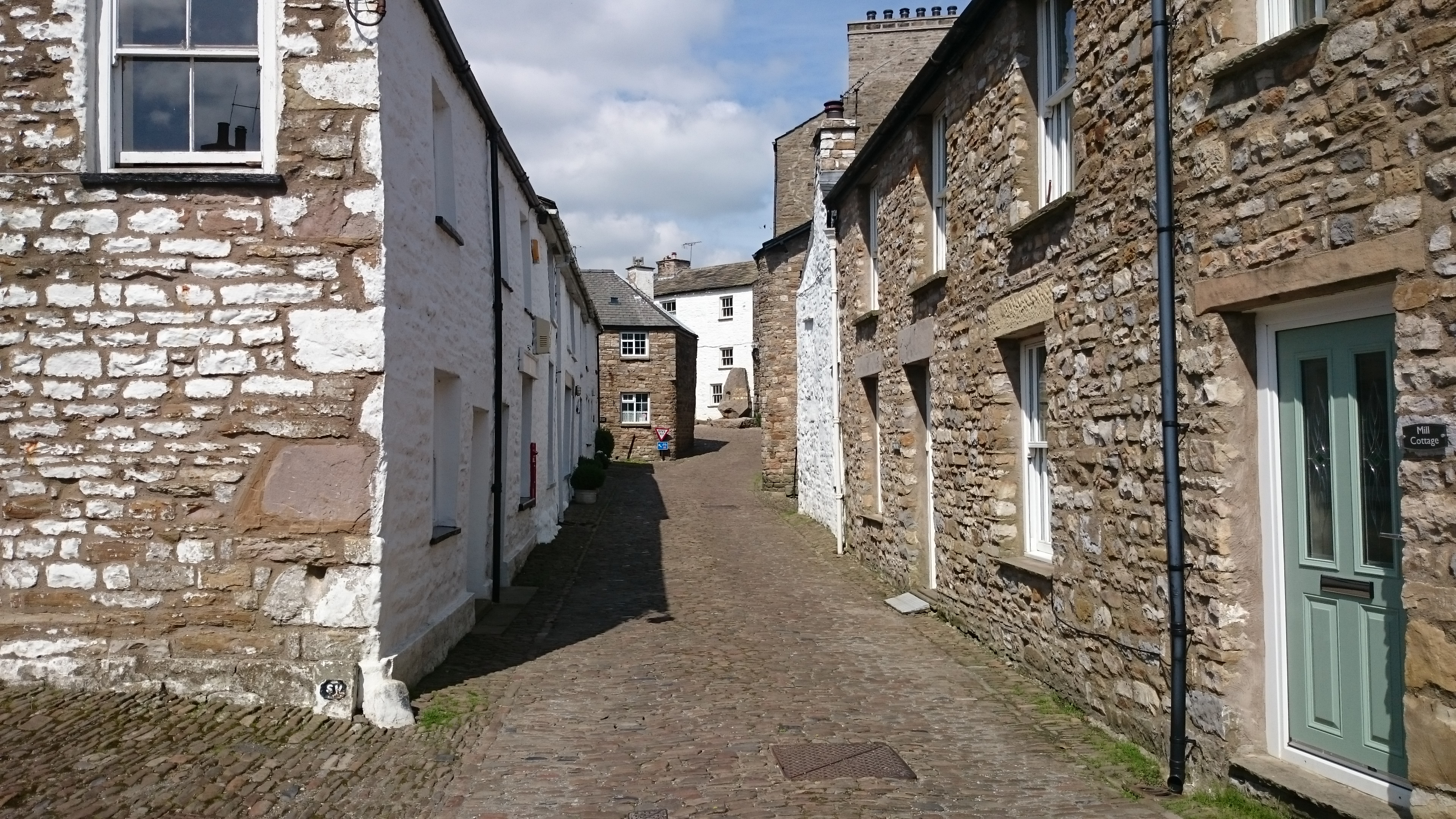
Dent, Cumbria, birthplace of Thomas Dent, present day

Thomas de Dent, Thomas Dyvelyn, Thomas Denton, or Thomas of Dublin (died after 1361) was an English-born cleric and judge who held high office in Ireland during the reign of King Edward III, and was praised as a diligent and hard-working Crown official, who damaged his health through overwork.

He was born at Dent, then in the West Riding of Yorkshire (now in Cumbria), and may have been the son of John de Dent. During his years in Ireland he was sometimes known as Thomas Dyvelyn, which was an early form of "Thomas of Dublin", or as Thomas Denton. His petition to the Crown in 1358, confusingly, calls him both Thomas Dent and Thomas Dyvelyn.

He took holy orders, and became a clerk in the Royal service. He is first heard of in 1331 as the defendant in a lawsuit for poaching and trespass at Ingleton, North Yorkshire brought by John, 3rd Lord Mowbray; John de Dent, who was possibly his father, was named as co-defendant.

== Early career ==
Lord Mowbray's lawsuit against him in no way impeded his career as a lawyer. He came to Ireland to serve as King's Attorney (the office which was later called Serjeant-at-law, not Attorney General for Ireland; his actual title was King's Advocate) in 1331. He quickly became a trusted member of the Irish administration and in 1332 was sent to Westminster to report on the political crisis which had led to the imprisonment of Maurice FitzGerald, 1st Earl of Desmond and other Anglo-Irish nobles.

== Judge ==
In 1334 he was appointed a justice of the Court of Common Pleas (Ireland). He was transferred to the Court of King's Bench (Ireland) in 1337. He became Lord Chief Justice of Ireland in 1341, as part of a widespread reform of the Irish judiciary, which included the replacement of Irish-born personnel with English judges. This was a common remedy of the English Crown for complaints about the corruption and inefficiency of the Irish government, and on this occasion reflected the King's personal preference for English over Anglo-Irish Crown servants.

Sir Ralph d'Ufford, Lord Lieutenant of Ireland 1344-6, pursued a vigorous policy of filling the administration with his own men. Dent later complained that for some time he sat on the Court of King's Bench alone, with no puisne justices to assist him. He returned briefly to England by 1343, when he served on a Royal Commission at Kendal, but was back in Ireland the following year. In 1347 he was appointed to head a commission of oyer and terminer to investigate the activities of Hugh de Burgh, who was accused of "oppression", i.e. maladministration, as Lord Treasurer of Ireland. There is an entry in the Close Rolls for 1347 ordering payment to him of 10 marks, stated to be in part payment of his full salary of 40 marks per annum.

He was appointed Chief Justice of the Irish Common Pleas, then often titled "Chief Justice of the Dublin Bench", and served in that office from 1344–58. In 1345 he received a rather stern communication from King Edward III and his Privy Council, concerning a case of assault brought by Margery Poe against John de la Pulle. John complained that the case had been repeatedly adjourned by Denton's colleagues Simon Fitz-Richard and John Gernoun, "through the intervention of error", to John's great prejudice. Denton was ordered to examine the records and report to the Justiciar of Ireland, so that the Justiciar could take whatever action was necessary to remedy the injustice.

Denton stepped down as Chief Justice of the Pleas in 1358, due by his own account to his "infirmity". His salary, according to his own petition for payment of it, which is partly corroborated by the Close Rolls, was seriously in arrears when he retired.

He was granted a lease for the term of his life of the royal manor of Esker, near Lucan in County Dublin in 1351: Esker was often leased out to royal servants who were in high favour with the Crown; the previous tenant had been Roget Darcy, Constable of Newcastle Mackynegan (presumably the same Roger who was briefly Justiciar of Ireland). In 1355, on his own petition, Thomas was granted a special allowance of £13 for his "great and strenuous labours" in 1354-5, when he served as Chief Justice without any puisne judges to assist him, injuring his own heath thereby, and for his general diligence in the King's business.

== Petition for payment of his salary ==
He is last heard of in 1361, when he was visiting England. He was still in the King's service at the time, but probably retired soon afterwards. He may have been in some financial distress in his last years, judging by his petition to the English Parliament asking for payment of the sums due to him, which was evidently written shortly after he left office in 1358. According to the petition he was forced to step down as Chief Justice due to ill health, and his fees were now seriously in arrears. We know from the Close Rolls that in 1347 he was paid 10 marks instead of the 40 due. He requested that the arrears be paid from the King's Treasury in England or any other suitable source.
