= Chief Justice of the Common Pleas for Ireland =

Legal position

The chief justice of the Common Pleas for Ireland was the presiding judge of the Court of Common Pleas in Ireland, which was known in its early years as the Court of Common Bench, or simply as "the Bench" or "the Dublin bench". It was one of the senior courts of common law in Ireland, and was a mirror of the Court of Common Pleas in England. The Court of Common Pleas was one of the "four courts" which sat in the building in Dublin which is still known as the Four Courts, apart from a period in the fourteenth century when it relocated to Carlow, which was thought, wrongly as it turned out, to be both more central and more secure for the rulers of Norman Ireland.

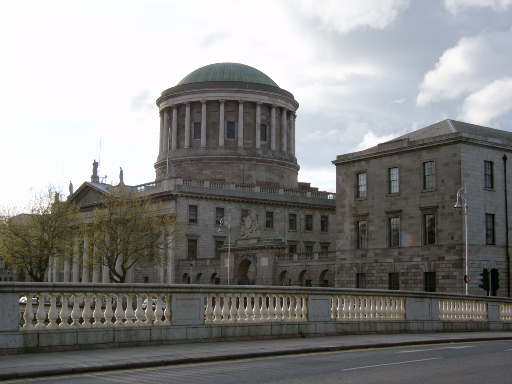
Four Courts

According to Francis Elrington Ball, the court was fully operational by 1276. It was staffed by the chief justice, of whom Robert Bagod was the first, and two or three associate justices. The Court functioned until the passing of the Supreme Court of Judicature Act (Ireland) 1877 when it was merged into the new High Court of Justice in Ireland. The last Chief Justice of the Common Pleas for Ireland, Sir Michael Morris, continued to hold the title until 1887, when he was appointed Lord Chief Justice of Ireland.

== List of chief justices of the common pleas for Ireland ==
- 1274 Robert Bagod
- 1298 Thomas de Chaddesworth (temporary)
- 1298 Simon de Ludgate
- 1302 Sir Richard de Exeter
- 1308 William le Deveneys
- 1308 Sir Richard de Exeter
- 1323 Richard Willoughby
- 1325 Henry de Hambury
- 1327 Nicholas Fastolf
- 1329 William de Rodyard
- 1331 Robert de Scardeburgh
- 1335 Simon Fitz-Richard, first term
- 1338 John de Rees
- 1338 Simon Fitz-Richard, second term
- 1341 John Gernoun
- 1344 Thomas de Dent
- 1358 Robert Preston, 1st Baron Gormanston
- 1378 Henry Mitchell
- 1380 Stephen de Bray
- 1383 William de Langham
- 1385 John de Shriggeley
- 1385 Edmund de Clay
- 1386 John Tirel
- 1396 John Giffard
- 1396 John Fitzadam
- 1419 William Tynbegh
- 1420 John Blakeney, first term
- 1424 William Tynbegh, second term
- 1424 John Blakeney, second term
- 1428 Sir James Alleyn
- 1430 John Blakeney, third term
- 1438 Robert Dowdall
- 1482 Thomas Plunket, first term
- 1494 John Topcliffe
- 1496 Thomas Bowring
- 1498 Thomas Plunket, second term
- 1514 Richard Delahide
- 1534 Thomas Luttrell
- 1554 John Bathe
- 1559 Robert Dillon (died 1580)
- 1580 Nicholas Nugent
- 1581 Robert Dillon died 1597, first term
- 1593 William Weston
- 1594 Robert Dillon died 1597, second term
- 1597 Nicholas Walsh
- 1612 Dominick Sarsfield, 1st Viscount Sarsfield
- 1634 Gerard Lowther
- 1660 James Donnellan
- 1665 Sir Edward Smith (or Smythe)
- 1670 Robert Booth
- 1679 John Keating
- 1691 Richard Pyne
- 1695 John Hely
- 1701 Richard Cox
- 1703 Sir Robert Doyne
- 1714 John Forster
- 1720 Sir Richard Levinge, 1st Baronet
- 1724 Thomas Wyndham, 1st Baron Wyndham
- 1727 William Whitshed (died just after taking up office)
- 1727 James Reynolds
- 1740 Henry Singleton
- 1753 Sir William Yorke, 1st Baronet
- 1761 Richard Aston
- 1765 Richard Clayton
- 1770 Marcus Paterson
- 1787 Hugh Carleton, 1st Viscount Carleton

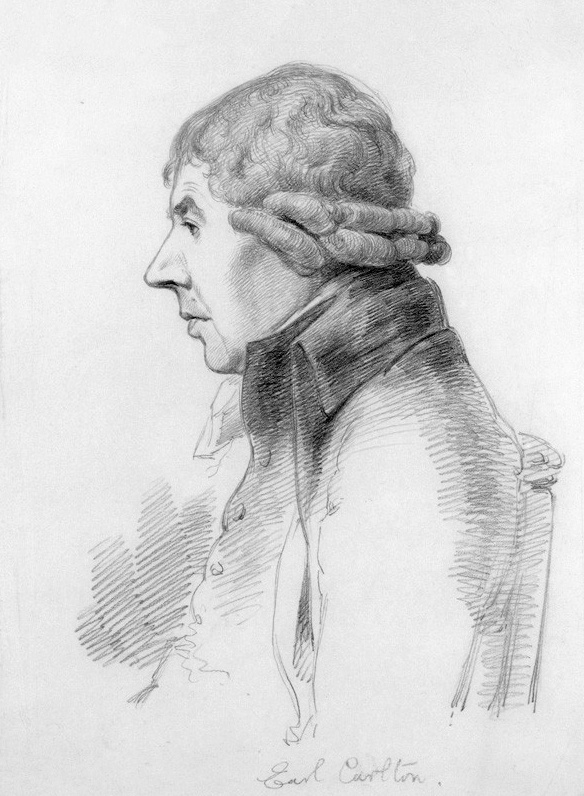
Chief Justice Carleton

- 1800 John Toler, 1st Earl of Norbury
- 1827 William Plunket, 1st Baron Plunket
- 1830 John Doherty
- 1850 James Henry Monahan
- 1876 Michael Morris
