= John Estrete =

Irish judge, author, lecturer and statesman

John Estrete, or Strete (died after 1511) was an Irish judge, author, law lecturer and statesman of the late fifteenth century. He held the offices of King's Serjeant, Deputy Chief Baron of the Irish Exchequer, and Master of the Coinage of Ireland. He was a member of the Privy Council of Ireland. He wrote at least one legal textbook, Natura Brevium.

He was a supporter of Gerald FitzGerald, 8th Earl of Kildare, who was almost all-powerful in Ireland for many years and was prepared to defy the English Crown on occasion. Despite his close connection to Kildare, Estrete in time gained the confidence of the English Crown, and acted as an intermediary between the Crown and Kildare, notably during the rebellion of Lambert Simnel in 1487.

== Family ==
The Estrete (or Strete) family were prosperous citizens of fifteenth-century Dublin, who later acquired lands in Louth and Meath. The name is generally thought to be an early form of Street. John was the son of John Estrete senior and his wife Joanna (or Jeneta). He was married and had four sons and two daughters, but by 1488 only two of his children, George and Katherine, were still alive. It is not always clear whether the John Estrete referred to in legal deeds of 1480 and 1481 was the father or the son (the elder John Estrete died before 1488). It was almost certainly the father who had property dealings with Simon Walsh, skinner, in 1480/1.

== Career ==
=== Early years ===
He is known to have been practising in the Irish courts of common law by 1477. In 1478 he went to England and received a royal pardon for an unspecified offence. He was appointed King's Serjeant in 1480. He probably owed this appointment to the influence of Gerald FitzGerald, the "Great Earl of Kildare", who was then beginning his effective control of the Irish Government, which he dominated with short intervals for 35 years. In about 1481 Estrete was entrusted with the management of the customs duties for the Port of Drogheda. In 1483 a statute of the Irish Parliament gave him first charge over any payment out of the revenues from the cocket (the official custom house seal) and customs of Dublin. In 1480 a John Estrete (he is referred to as "John Estrete senior", so this was most likely the judge's father rather than the judge himself) bought land in County Meath from Simon Walshe and his wife Juliana. The younger John owned a house on Fishamble Street in Dublin city centre, which he sold to Philip Fleming in 1485.

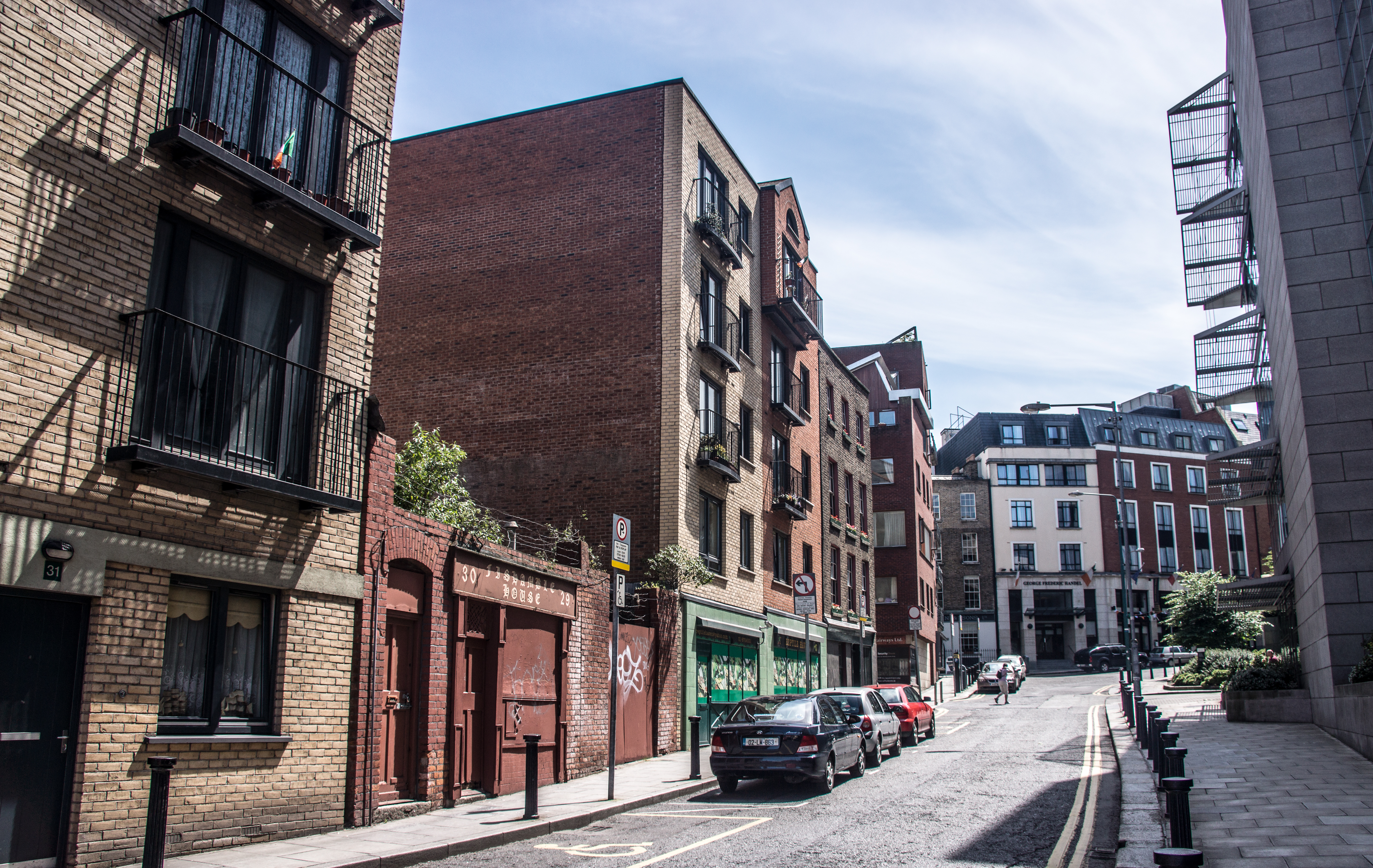
Fishamble Street, where Estrete had a house in the 1480s, present day

=== Law school ===
As King's Serjeant, he was notable for running an elementary law school, at a time when members of the Irish Bar were required to obtain their formal education at the Inns of Court in London. Sir William Darcy, the Vice-Treasurer of Ireland for many years, recalled in later life that in 1482–83 he and other law students had spent the law terms at Estrete's house in Dublin, studying those English legal texts which were required reading for law students who intended to qualify at the Bar, and which would prepare them to proceed to the Inns of Court. Among these lawbooks was one by Estrete himself, Natura Brevium, which has not survived. Estrete also taught them Law French (the official language of the law courts until the seventeenth century), and Darcy was still writing it fluently fifty years later.

=== Under Richard III ===
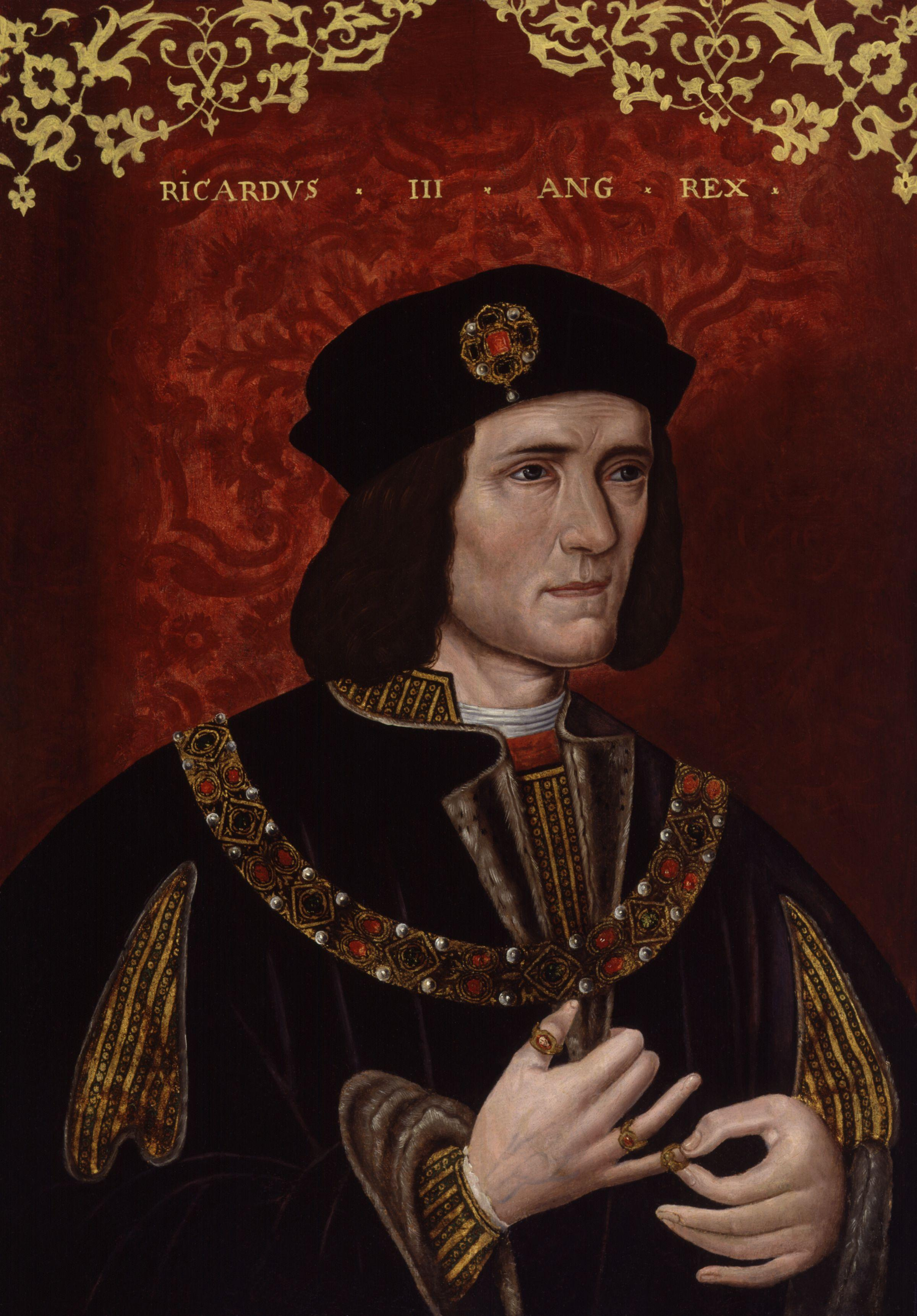
Richard III

Estrete remained in office as King's Serjeant when Edward IV was succeeded (after a short hiatus) by his brother Richard III in 1483. The King was unwilling to confirm Estrete's patron, the Earl of Kildare, as Lord Deputy of Ireland, and Kildare sent Estrete to England to plead his case to be retained as Deputy for ten years, and also demanded a salary of £1000 a year and several grants of land. Kildare also stressed the extent of his power in Ireland and the obvious advantages to the King of employing him. The King however made it clear that he would do nothing until Kildare came to see him personally, and the Earl reluctantly complied. This episode probably established Estrete's role as an intermediary between Kildare and the English Crown. The King's letter of instructions to Estrete, which was to be shown to Kildare, survives.

== Lambert Simnel ==
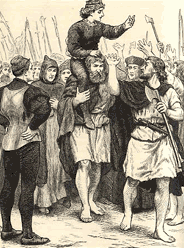
Lambert Simnel in Ireland

After Richard's downfall at the Battle of Bosworth in 1485, the new King Henry VII confirmed Estrete in office as Serjeant. He travelled to London in 1486 and had a personal audience with the King. He was still in England in attendance on the King the following year.

When the Yorkist pretender to the Crown, Lambert Simnel (who falsely claimed to be a nephew of Edward IV and Richard III), appeared in Ireland in 1487 Kildare was his strongest supporter, and encouraged him to invade England and seize the throne. The King sent Estrete to Dublin with an invitation to Kildare to come to England to discuss his position; it appears that Henry was prepared to grant roughly the same terms which Kildare had demanded from Richard III. Kildare did not respond to the offer, and Simnel with an army raised by Kildare invaded England, only to see his cause crushed at the Battle of Stoke Field in June 1487.

== Later years ==
While Simnel's supporters, including Kildare, his powerful father-in-law Rowland FitzEustace, 1st Baron Portlester, and most of the Anglo-Irish ruling class, were forced to sue for a royal pardon for their treason, which was granted in 1488, Estrete was regarded as a reliable King's man, who was described as "the King's servant and counsellor". He was appointed Master of the Irish Coinage and a Privy Councillor: Chrimes in his biography of Henry VII states that he was appointed to the Privy Council of Ireland, but other historians state that as a mark of special royal favour, he was made an English councillor. Certainly the King, who was not overly generous even to his most loyal supporters, called Estrete "a man worthy of reward". His highest office in Ireland was Deputy Chief Baron: Lord Portlester had used his influence to obtain the office of Chief Baron for his son Oliver FitzEustace, who was mentally deficient, with the right to appoint his deputy. Estrete held office from 1487 until 1491. He was still alive in 1511, when his appointment as Master of the Irish Coinage was renewed.

== Christ Church Cathedral ==
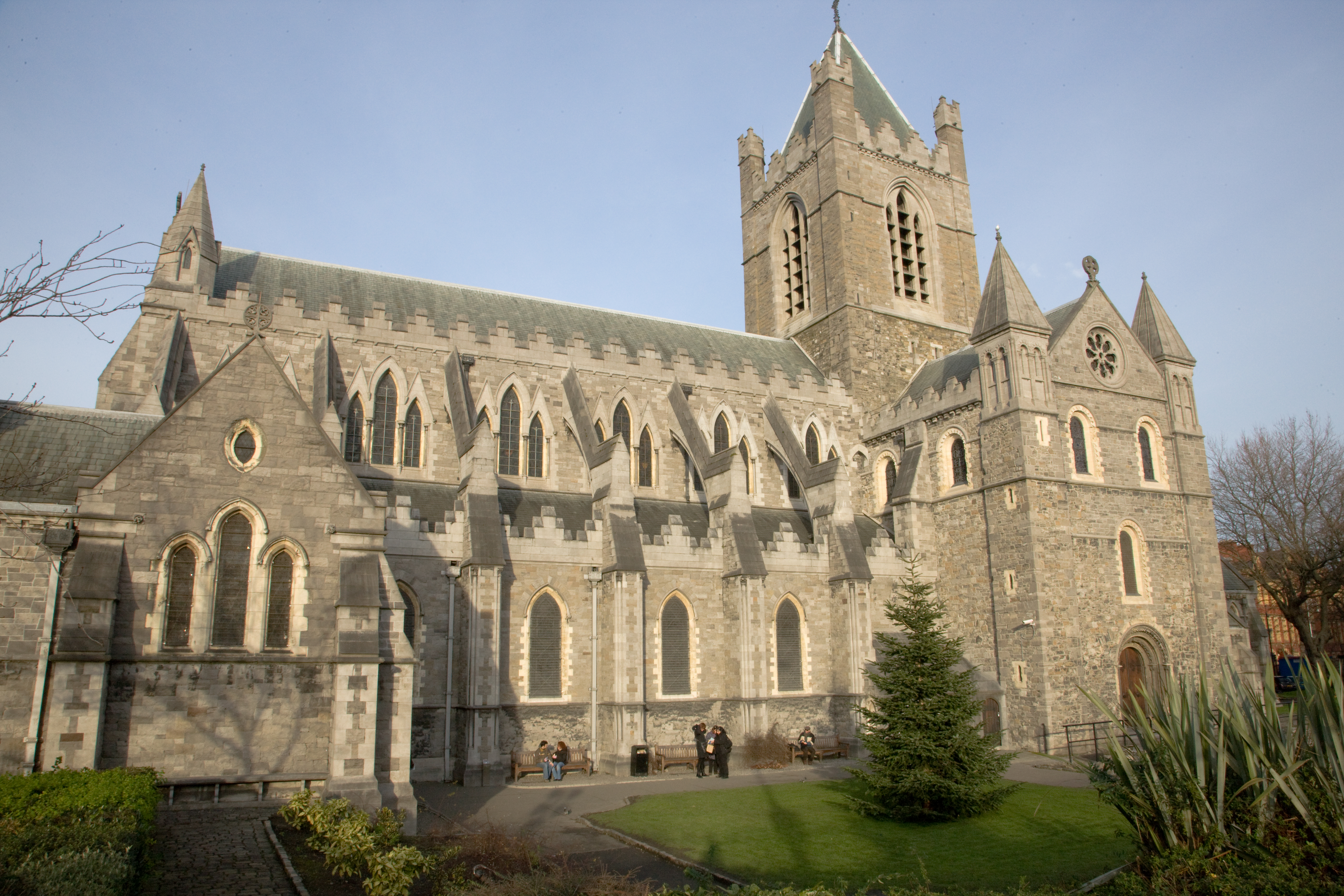
Christchurch Cathedral, Dublin

In 1485 Estrete established a chantry in Christ Church Cathedral, Dublin, where he endowed a priest to sing masses for the souls of his benefactors, Kildare and Portlester. For this purpose he granted certain lands and other property in trust to the Cathedral. In 1488 the grant was extended to provide for masses for the souls of the King, and for Estrete's parents, his brothers Patrick and Christopher, and his living and deceased children. Mass was to be sung every day in the Chapel of St Laurence O'Toole, with a high mass once a week. After Estrete's own death, mass was to be sung for him every year.
