= Lord Chief Justice of Ireland =

Former senior judge role in Ireland

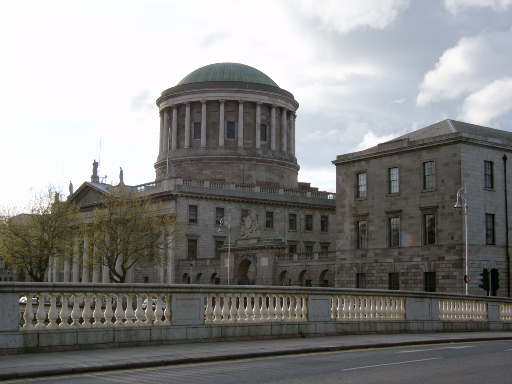
The Four Courts The headquarters of the Irish judicial system since 1804. The Court of King's Bench was one of the original four courts that sat there.

The Court of King's Bench (or Court of Queen's Bench during the reign of a Queen) was one of the senior courts of common law in Ireland. It was a mirror of the Court of King's Bench in England. The Lord Chief Justice was the most senior judge in the court, and the second most senior Irish judge under English rule and later when Ireland became part of the United Kingdom. Additionally, for a brief period between 1922 and 1924, the Lord Chief Justice of Ireland was the most senior judge in the Irish Free State.

== History of the position ==
The office was created during the Lordship of Ireland (1171–1536) and continued in existence under the Kingdom of Ireland (1536–1800) and the United Kingdom of Great Britain and Ireland. Prior to the Supreme Court of Judicature Act (Ireland) 1877, the Lord Chief Justice presided over the Court of King's/Queen's Bench, and as such ranked foremost amongst the judges sitting at common law. After 1877, the Lord Chief Justice assumed the presidency of the Queen's Bench Division of the new High Court of Justice, which sat permanently in the Four Courts in Dublin.

Thomas Lefroy, later Lord Chief Justice of Ireland (LCJ 1852–1866), was used by Jane Austen as the model for her Pride and Prejudice character Mr. Darcy. Lefroy and Austen had had a romance in their youths. Other prominent Lord Chief Justices of Ireland include Lord Whiteside (LCJ 1866–1876), who as a Queen's Counsel had defended Irish nationalist leader Daniel O'Connell in court, Gerald FitzGerald, 3rd Earl of Desmond, Hugh de Lacy, Risteárd de Tiúit, John Doherty, Thomas Marlay, James Ley, Peter O'Brien, and James Henry Mussen Campbell, 1st Baron Glenavy (LCJ 1916–1918, later Chairman of Seanad Éireann and grandfather of the satirist Patrick Campbell). One Lord Chief Justice, Lord Kilwarden, was killed by a crowd during Robert Emmet's 1803 rebellion.

== Abolition of the position ==
The abolition of the position of Lord Chief Justice of Ireland was originally envisaged in a draft of the Government of Ireland Bill 1920. The Bill originally proposed that the Lord Chief Justice of Ireland would become the Lord Chief Justice of Southern Ireland. However, the then incumbent, Sir Thomas Molony, 1st Baronet, vigorously lobbied for the right to continue to hold the title even after the Bill was passed. Ultimately, his arguments were at least in part accepted: The Act, in its transitional provisions, provided that while he would in effect be the first Lord Chief Justice of Southern Ireland, his title remained that of Lord Chief Justice of Ireland, although this was a transitional provision and was not a right to be enjoyed by his successors.

Subsequently, the highest-ranking judicial posting in Ireland, that of Lord Chancellor of Ireland, was abolished in December 1922. This left the office of the Lord Chief Justice of Ireland as the most senior judge in the Irish Free State but not for very long. The Constitution of the Irish Free State adopted in December 1922 clearly envisaged the early establishment of new courts for the nascent state and the abolition of the position of the Lord Chief Justice of Ireland. However, this only took place when the Courts of Justice Act 1924 was finally adopted. Under that Act, the position of the Chief Justice of the Irish Free State superseded the position of Lord Chief Justice of Ireland as the highest judicial office in the Irish Free State.

In what became Northern Ireland, the position was superseded by the position of Lord Chief Justice of Northern Ireland.

== List of holders ==
Date	Name	Notes	Left office
1324-7	Nicholas Fastolf, knight	(1st term)	
1327-8	Henry de Hambury	From Hanbury, Worcestershire	
1328-30	Nicholas Fastolf, knight	(2nd term)	
1330-1	Elias de Asshebournham, knight	(1st term)	
1331-2	Peter Tilliol, knight	Born at Scaleby Castle, Cumberland	
1332-3	Thomas Louth	From Louth, Lincolnshire (1st term)	
1333-4	Robert de Scardeburgh	("but probably did not act")	
1334-7	Thomas Louth	(2nd term)	
1337	Elias de Asshebournham, knight	(2nd term)	
1337	Thomas Louth	(3rd term)	
1337-8	Elias de Asshebournham, knight	(3rd term)	
1338	Thomas Louth	(4th term)	
1338-41	Elias de Asshebournham	(4th term)	
1341-4	Thomas de Dent	Patronymic derived from Dent, Yorkshire	
1344-5	Robert de Scardeburgh	From Scarborough, North Yorkshire (only substantive term)	
1345-6	John le Hunt	Born in Fenny Stratford, Buckinghamshire	
1346	Henry de Motlowe, knight	Possibly connected to Mobberley or Motburlege, Cheshire	
1346-51	John de Rednesse	From Reedness, Yorkshire (1st term)	
1351-4	Godfrey de Foljambe, knight	Born in Tideswell, Derbyshire	
1354-6	John de Rednesse	(2nd term)	
1356	Richard de Wirkeley	Prior of the Order of Hospitallers in Ireland - possibly connected to Wakefield, Yorkshire	
1356-9	John de Rednesse	(3rd term)	
1359	William le Petit		
1359-61	John de Rednesse	(4th term)	
1361-3	William de Notton, knight	From Notton, Yorkshire	
1363-5	Richard White	From Clongill, County Meath	
1365-7	Thomas de la Dale, knight	Born in Little Barford, Bedfordshire	
1367-70	John Keppock, or Keppok	(1st term)	
1370-2	William de Skipwith, knight	Family originally from Skipwith, Yorkshire	
1372–82	John Keppock, or Keppok	(2nd term)	
1382	Sir Thomas Mortimer, knight	Family originally from Mortemer, Seine-Maritime, Normandy	
1384	John de Sotheron	Born at Great Mitton, Lancashire	
1385	John Penros	Born in Escalls, Cornwall	
1386	Edmund de Clay	From the common pleas	
1388, 10 July	Richard Plunkett	Of a leading Anglo-Irish family with branches in County Meath and County Louth	
1388, 23 September	Peter Rowe	(1st term)	
1395	William Hankford	From Hankford in the parish of Bulkworthy, Devon	
1396	William Tynbegh, clerk	Family originally from Tenby, Pembrokeshire	
1397	Peter Rowe	(2nd term)	
1397	Stephen de Bray	(1st term) From the common pleas - family possibly from Bray, County Wicklow	
1404	Richard Rede	From the Exchequer	
1406	Stephen de Bray	(2nd term)	
1426	Henry Fortescue		
1429	Stephen de Bray	(3rd term)	
1435	Christopher Bernevall, or Barnewall	2nd justice	
1437	William Boys		
1437	Christopher Bernevall, or Barnewall	(2nd term)	
1446	Richard Bye		
1447	Robert Plunket		
1447	Sir James Alleyn		
1457	Nicholas Barnewall	(1st term)	
1461	Sir Thomas Fitz-Christopher Plunket	(1st term)	
1461	Nicholas Barnewall	(2nd term)	
1463 (or before)	Sir Thomas Fitz-Christopher Plunket	(2nd term)	
1468	John Chevir	From Kilkenny. Former Master of the Rolls in Ireland.	
1474	Philip Bermingham	(d 1490, buried St. Mary's Abbey, Dublin)	
1490	Thomas Cusacke		
1494	Thomas Bowring	Family from Bowringsleigh, Devon	
1496	John Topcliffe	From the Exchequer	
1513	Patrick Bermingham		
1521	Patrick Bermingham	By a new patent	
1533	Sir Bartholomew Dillon, knight	2nd justice, from the Exchequer	Died same year
1534	Patrick Finglas	From the Exchequer	
1535	Sir Gerald Aylmer	From the Exchequer	
1559	John Plunket		
1562	John Plunket	By a new patent	
1583	James Dowdall		
1586	Robert Gardiner	Serjeant-at-law in England	
1604	Sir James Ley	Afterwards Earl of Marlborough: resigned	
1608	Sir Humphrey Winch, knight	Chief Baron; from the Exchequer	Made a Justice of the Common Pleas of England
1612	Sir John Denham, knight	Chief Baron, from the Exchequer	
1617	Sir William Jones, knight	Serjeant-at-law	
1620	Sir George Shurley, or Shirley, knight	Serjeant-at-law (d.1647)	
1655	Richard Pepys	Under the Protectorate – died 2 January 1659	
1659	John Santhey	19 Jan pro tem on Pepys' death	
1659	William Basill	Attorney general; 24 Jan	
1660	Sir James Barry, knight	Afterwards Lord Santry	
1673	Sir John Povey, knight	From the Exchequer	
1679	Sir Robert Booth, knight		Died the next year
1681	Sir William Davys, knight	Prime serjeant	
1687	Thomas Nugent		Removed
1690	Sir Richard Reynell, 1st Baronet		Dismissed
1695	Sir Richard Pyne	Chief Justice of the Common Pleas	
1709	Alan Brodrick		Removed
1711	Sir Richard Cox, 1st Baronet		Removed
1714	William Whitshed		Removed to the Common Pleas
1727	John Rogerson	Previously attorney general	Died in office 1741
1741	Thomas Marlay	Previously Chief Baron of the Exchequer	Retired 1751
1751	St George Caulfeild	Previously attorney general	Retired 1760
1760	Warden Flood	Previously attorney general	Died in office 1764
1764	John Gore, later Lord Annaly	Previously solicitor general; 24 Aug	Died in office 1784
1784	John Scott	Previously Prime serjeant; Created Lord Earlsfort, afterwards Viscount and Earl of Clonmell; 29 Apr	Died in office 1798
1798	Arthur Wolfe, Lord Kilwarden	Previously attorney-general; 13 June	Murdered 23 July 1803
1803	William Downes	Previously a judge of the Court of King's Bench; afterward 1st Baron Downes; 12 Sep	Retired 1822
1822	Charles Kendal Bushe	Previously solicitor general from 1805; 14 Feb	Retired 1841
1841	Edward Pennefather	Previously solicitor general; 10 Nov	Retired 1846
1846	Francis Blackburne	Previously Master of the Rolls; 21 Jan	Became Lord Chancellor 1852
1852	Thomas Langlois Lefroy	Previously a Baron of the Exchequer	Retired 1866
1866	James Whiteside	Former attorney-general	Died in office 1876
1877	George Augustus Chichester May	Previously attorney-general	Retired 1887
1887	Michael Morris	Previously Chief Justice of the Common Pleas	Became Lord of Appeal in Ordinary 1889
1889	Peter O'Brien	Previously attorney-general	Retired 1913
1913	Richard Robert Cherry	Previously a Lord Justice of Appeal	Retired 1916
1916	James Henry Mussen Campbell	Previously attorney-general	Became Lord Chancellor 1918
1918–1924	Thomas Molony	Previously a Lord Justice of Appeal	Position abolished

== Sources ==
- List from Liber Munerum Publicorum Hiberniae, by Rowley Lascelles, copied in Haydn's Book of Dignities
- Names from 1852 onwards from The Oxford Companion to Law, ed David M. Walker, 1980
- Francis Elrington Ball The Judges in Ireland 1221–1921 2 Vols (John Murray London 1926)
