= Court of Common Pleas (Ireland) =

Senior court in Ireland (13th–19th centuries)

The Court of Common Pleas was one of the principal courts of common law in Ireland. It was a mirror image of the equivalent court in England. Common Pleas was one of the four courts of justice which gave the Four Courts in Dublin, which is still in use as a courthouse, its name. Its remit, as in England, was to hear lawsuits between ordinary citizens.

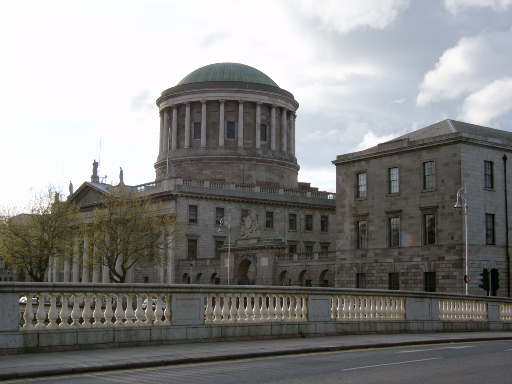
The Four Courts, present day

== History ==
According to Elrington Ball the Irish Court of Common Pleas, which was known in its early years as the Common Bench or simply the Bench, was fully operational by 1276. It was headed by its Chief Justice (the Chief Justice of the Irish Common Pleas, as distinct from the Lord Chief Justice of Ireland, who was the head of the Irish Court of King's Bench). He had two (occasionally three) justices to assist him. The first Chief Justice was Sir Robert Bagod, former High Sheriff of County Limerick, a member of an old Dublin family which gave its name to Baggot Street. In the early centuries, he was often referred to as "Chief Justice of the Bench" or "the Dublin Bench".

Traditionally its workload was less heavy than that of the Court of King's Bench, although in the 1390s it was apparently heavy enough for a King's Serjeant, John Haire, to be appointed to plead on behalf of the Crown in the Common Pleas alone. Common Pleas had a reputation for being more conservative than other courts, and more resistant to reform. Its judges had a reputation, which was probably unjustified, for being less learned than those of the other courts of common law, King's Bench and Exchequer. They were also more likely than their colleagues to be Irish-born, and to be fluent in Irish, although a number of early justices, like John de Ponz and William Fauvel, were English.

== The move to Carlow in the 1360s ==
Along with the Irish Court of Exchequer, it moved to Carlow in the early 1360s, due to the disturbed political conditions in Dublin; but the judges, finding that Carlow was also afflicted with political unrest, returned after thirty years to Dublin. A petition for redress dated 1369 refers to the recent burning of the town by the Irish of Leinster, and more generally to "the time of war", during which most of the judges dared not go to Carlow. Hostile Irish clans destroyed Carlow by fire several times, notably in 1363, 1376 and 1391–2. John Tirel, Chief Justice of Common Pleas 1386-95, was notoriously reluctant to brave "the dangers of the roads". He usually acted through a Deputy, but in 1389 he was appointed the justice for Carlow and ordered to hold the assizes there. In 1392 he is described in the Patent Rolls as "Chief Justice of the Common Bench of the King of Carlow".

== Abolition ==
Under the Supreme Court of Judicature Act (Ireland) 1877, the Court of Common Pleas was merged into the new High Court of Justice in Ireland as one of its constituent divisions; the Chief Justice of the Irish Common Pleas retained his old rank. After the first decade of the new Court's existence, it was decided that it could be made to work more efficiently by merging the Common Pleas and Queen's Bench Divisions. The Division thereafter was called Queen's Bench, and the term Common Pleas fell into disuse.
