= William de Notton =

Member of the Parliament of England

Sir William de Notton, or Norton (died c.1365) was an English landowner and judge, who had a highly successful career in both England and Ireland, culminating in his appointment as Lord Chief Justice of Ireland in 1361.

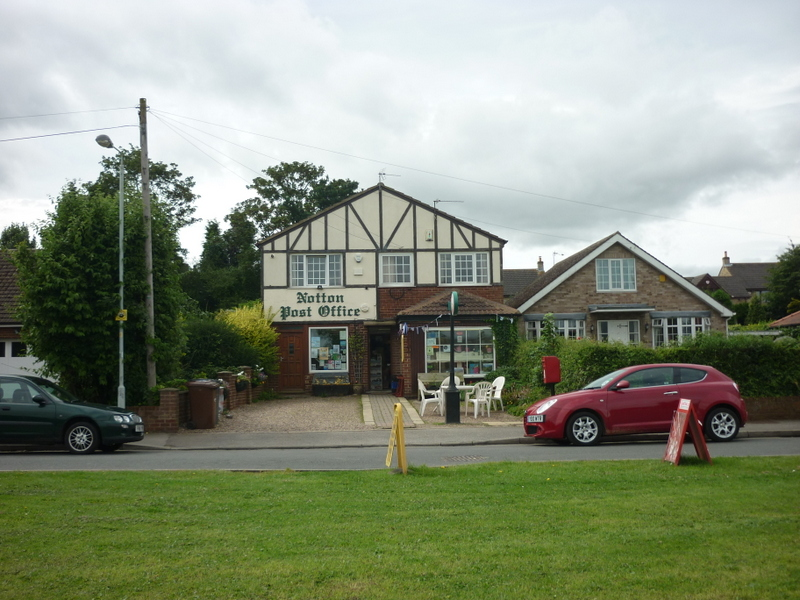
Notton, West Yorkshire, William's birthplace, present day

He belonged to the landowning family of de Notton, who took their name from Notton in West Yorkshire. By the time of his birth, however, Notton had already passed to the Darcy family. He acquired the manors of Fishlake, which he bought from John de Wingfield, Monk Bretton and Woolley Hall in Yorkshire, as well as Litlington, Cambridgeshire, and Cocken Hatch near Royston, Hertfordshire. Cocken Hatch had previously been held by John de Vere, 7th Earl of Oxford, who granted his lands there to William.

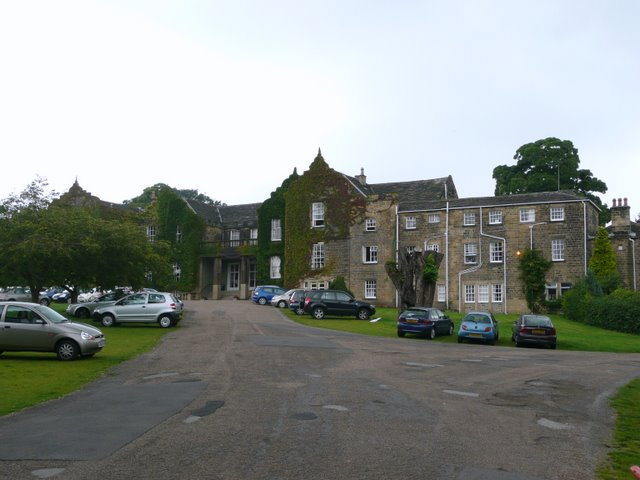
Woolley Hall, which William purchased, present day

== Early career ==
He served on a commission of oyer and terminer in 1343–5. In 1346 he became Serjeant-at-law: he was an excellent lawyer, whose arguments were frequently reported in the Year Books. He became a Member of Parliament in 1349 and sat on a commission to inquire into the condition of labourers and artisans in Surrey. A neighbouring landowner, John de Stainton, appointed William as guardian of his four daughters on his death. In 1353 he sat on a wide-ranging commission to inquire into all serious crimes committed in the lands granted by the King to Queen Philippa as her personal estates.

== Chantry ==
In 1350 he and his wife Isabel conveyed their lands at Fishlake, Monk Bretton, Woolley and Moseley to John de Birthwaite, the Prior of Monk Bretton Priory, to build a chantry chapel at Woolley, where prayers were to be said for the King and his family, and for Notton, Isabel and their children. The grant may have been inspired by the recent ending of the first outbreak of the Black Death, a time when many people felt a sense of thanksgiving for their deliverance from the plague, together with an increased awareness of their own mortality.

In 1354-5 he conveyed his lands at Cocken Hatch, which had been granted to him by the Earl of Oxford, to the Prior of Royston.

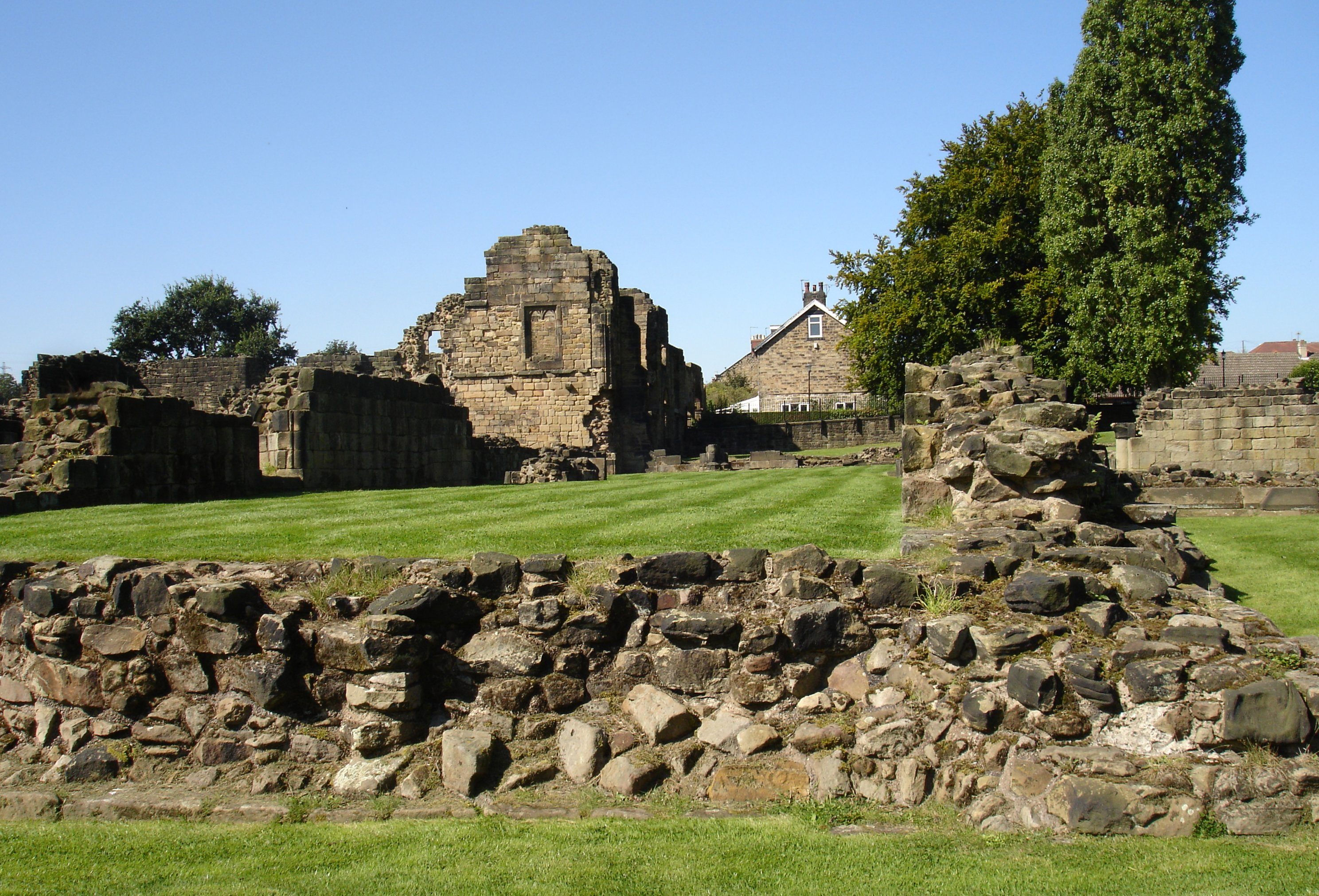
Ruins of Monk Bretton Priory

== Judge ==
In 1355 he was appointed a judge of the Court of King's Bench. When he was on assize in 1356 he was ordered to remove from office the Sheriffs of Oxfordshire and Northumberland. In 1357 he was appointed to a powerful commission to inquire into an alleged affray between a servant of John Gynwell, Bishop of Lincoln and members of the Order of Hospitallers. Ironically (in view of Notton's later office as Irish Chief Justice) the alleged instigator of the affray, Richard de Wirkeley, the Prior of the Hospitallers, was himself a former Lord Chief Justice of Ireland; while the commission included another former Irish Lord Chief Justice, Henry de Motlowe.

He sat on another judicial commission later in the same year to inquire into the death, presumed to be murder, of George de Longueville, described as "chevalier" (knight), at Billing, Northamptonshire. Longueville was an MP, and a member of the prominent landowning family who later owned Wolverton in Buckinghamshire. He was probably the father or brother of John Longueville, who married the heiress of Wolverton, Joan le Hunt, daughter of John le Hunt (yet another English judge who served as Lord Chief Justice of Ireland). Little seems to be known about the circumstances of Longueville's murder, and the outcome of the commission of inquiry into the crime is unknown.

== Excommunication and later career ==
In 1356 Thomas de Lisle, Bishop of Ely, was charged with inciting the murder of Wiliam Holm, a servant of Blanche of Lancaster, the King's cousin, with whom Bishop de Lisle had a long-standing quarrel, and was also accused of sheltering the murderers.

Notton sat on the court which found the Bishop guilty on both charges. For this Norton was summoned to appear and answer for his conduct at the Papal Court in Avignon in 1358, and when he failed to appear, he was excommunicated. King Edward III, who clearly placed great trust in Notton, simply ignored the sentence of excommunication. Notton remained on the King's Bench until 1361 when he was sent to Ireland as Lord Chief Justice. In 1363 he was a member of the Council which advised the King's second son Lionel of Antwerp, the Lord Lieutenant of Ireland.

He probably died in 1365, and was certainly dead before 1372, when his name disappears from the Patent Rolls and Close Rolls. By his wife Isabel he had at least two children, but much of his property passed to Sir William Fyncheden, Chief Justice of the Common Pleas in England, who died in 1374. The precise relationship between the two men is unclear.

Legal offices
Preceded by John de Rednesse	Lord Chief Justice of the King's Bench for Ireland; 1361-63	Succeeded by Richard White
