= Woolley Hall =

House in Woolley, West Yorkshire, England

Coordinates: 53.6134°N 1.5072°W

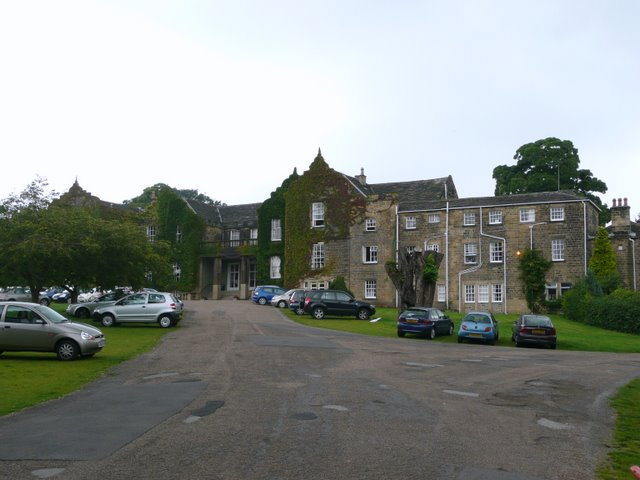
Woolley Hall in 2008

Woolley Hall is a country house in Woolley, West Yorkshire, England. It is a Grade II* listed building.

== Overview ==
In the mid-fourteenth century, the nucleus of what became the Woolley estate belonged to Sir William de Notton, a man of local origin who achieved wealth and fame as a lawyer, and was later appointed Lord Chief Justice of Ireland. He derived his name from Notton, the village to the east of Woolley. His lands in Woolley and Notton passed in 1365 to Sir William Fyncheden, by whose executor they were sold in 1377 to John Woodrove (or Woodroffe / Woodruffe) of Normanton. Despite owning these extensive lands, however, John Woodrove was not Lord of the Manor of Woolley, although his descendants would be.

The lordship of the manor, together with the initial manor house in Woolley, is first documented as owned by the Popeley family, of whom Robert Popeley was the last to reside. On his death he passed the building down to his only daughter Christine, who married into the Rilston family. The manor house remained with this line through four generations to her great grandson Robert Rilston, the son of Edmund. In around 1490, Robert sold this house, together with the lordship of the Manor of Woolley, to Sir Richard Woodrove (a descendant of John Woodrove), who added them to his existing estate.

There is apparently some confusion as to whether Rilston's manor house stood on the same site occupied by the present Woolley Hall. J.W. Walker, in his work on the Manor and Church of Woolley, seems to have assumed that Sir Richard Woodrove made Rilston's house his principal residence on acquiring it in 1490. However, Geoffrey Markham argues that Woodrove may have remained in his ancestral home in Woolley, itself a house of some importance, and that it may be this house, previously owned by Sir William de Notton and John Woodrove, that stood on or near the site of the present Hall.

Sir Richard Woodroffe (c. 1440 – 1522) had high standing in the area, and one of the last members of the Woodroffe/Woodruff family to reside in the Hall. In 1559, Francis Woodroffe was forced to sell the house and all his lands in Woolley and Notton to his cousin Michael Wentworth, the great-great-grandson of Sir Richard Woodroffe and descendant of Sir Thomas Wentworth (aka Golden Thomas), the great grandfather of Thomas Wentworth, 1st Earl of Strafford, for £6,000, the equivalent of nearly £1,200,000 today. Francis was the brother of Richard Woodroffe, who married Elizabeth Percy, the daughter of the infamous Thomas Percy, 7th Earl of Northumberland, one of the two ring leaders of the Rising of the North.

The present building in Woolley is an example of early Jacobean architecture, and was begun about 1635 and added onto at the turn of the 19th century by the architect Jeffry Wyatville. It stands in the village of Woolley near the M1 Motorway. Godfrey Wentworth was High Sheriff of Yorkshire for 1862–63.

After serving the Wentworth family into the 20th century, the hall was a college for a period. It is now owned by Wakefield Council, who use it as a conference centre and wedding location. In 2024, the Council decided to sell the hall. It has been marketed for sale with a bid deadline of 22 April 2025.

== Architecture ==
Michael Wentworth began rebuilding Woolley Hall in 1635. The new Woolley Hall consisted of an H-shaped building of moderate size. An east wing was added to the south front around 1680. The western wing was added during the mid eighteenth century. The eastern wings which form the rest of the present building were added in the early nineteenth century.

The house is constructed of hammer-dressed sandstone, with a slate roof. There are four storeys including the attic and basement.

The main entrance is located at the south side of the house. There is an open porch, built in 1800. Over the steps to the main entrance, a balustraded balcony is supported by two pillars. A semicircular balustrade runs from the bottom of the steps to the edge of the south walls of the west and east wings. This balustrade matches that on the porch balcony.

The western wing was built in the mid-eighteenth century. There is a single gable, matching those of the south front. At either side is an embattled parapet. The crest of the Wentworth family can be seen on the gable.

The north front of the house has a central three storey canted bay, with tall arched sash windows to the ground floor and rectangular sashes above, and an embattled parapet at the edge of the roof.

At the east side are service ranges added around 1800, around a yard open at the north-east side. The seventeenth-century extension to the south-west of the yard is gabled and has original seventeenth-century windows, as does the part of the 1635 building that is still visible.

The core of the house has a king-post roof with single angle struts, while the west wing has its own king-post roof and the east wing a six-bay notched-collar truss roof.

The stable blocks lie further to the east of the main house. The northern stable block was constructed by Watson and Pritchet in 1805-1810, of hammer-dressed sandstone, built in a U-shaped plan, facing south-east, and consisting of two storeys. The central section has a single gable, which is decorated with a plaque bearing the Wentworth griffin. Behind this gable is a clock-tower, upon which is mounted a weather vane in the form of a griffin. The smaller south stable block faces the north block across a courtyard. Again, the building is two-storey, and is constructed of hammer-dressed sandstone. Upon the cornice the Wentworth griffon can be seen. Attached to the front is a five-step mounting block with a dog-kennel underneath. The building was constructed in 1810 by Thomas Taylor.

== Interior ==
Internally, the ground and first floors were largely remodelled in 1807. A receipt for this work still exists in Woolley Hall’s archives, dated 1808, which shows that the work was carried out by a Thomas Shuttleworth at a cost of one thousand and two pounds, six shillings and sixpence halfpenny.

The three rooms of the western wing were built in the mid-eighteenth century. To the east of this lies the main hall, a large L-shaped room. The impressive main staircase is the work of Shuttleworth. According to the receipt presented to Godfrey Wentworth in 1808, the staircase is of Norway Oak and cost forty pounds.

The boardroom, to the north-west of the main hall, used to be the 'billiard room'. The music room, formerly the dining room, lies between the rear wings of the original 'H'. Late eighteenth century receipts held in Woolley Hall’s archives show that extensive alterations to the room were carried out by Joseph Hall in March 1796, including replacement of the chimney and parts of the walls, at a cost of eighty-one pounds, ten shillings and sixpence.

== See also ==
- Grade II* listed buildings in West Yorkshire
- Listed buildings in Woolley, West Yorkshire
