= Monk Bretton Priory =

Ruined monastery in South Yorkshire, England

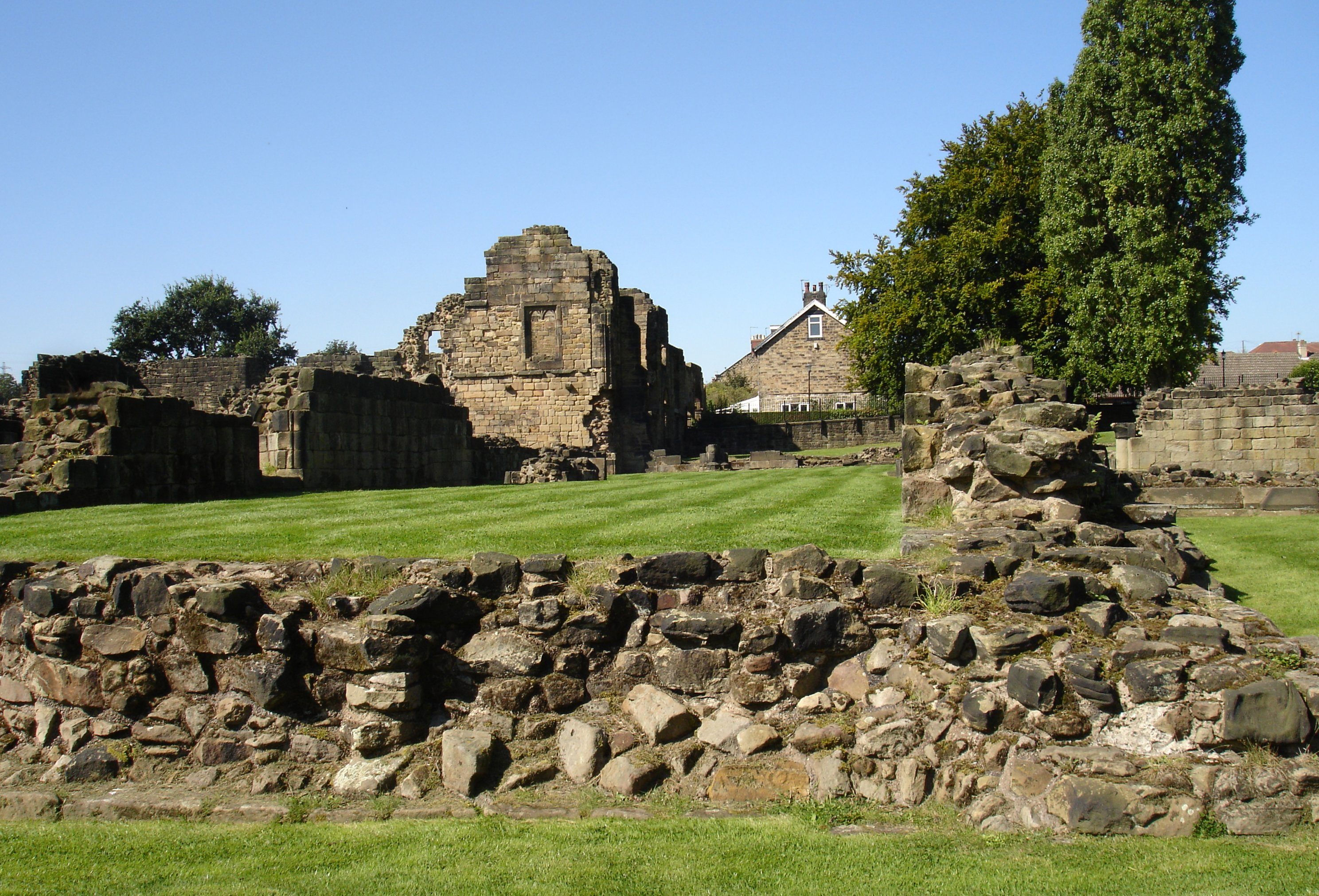
- Remains of Monk Bretton Priory beyond the cloister

- Location within South Yorkshire
- 53°33′14″N 1°26′18″W
- Type: Priory
- Location: Abbey Lane, Lundwood
- OS grid reference: SE376066

Site notes
- Area: South Yorkshire
- Governing body: English Heritage
- Owner: Metropolitan Borough of Barnsley

Scheduled monument
- Official name: Monk Bretton Priory Cluniac and Benedictine monastery: monastic precinct and two fishponds
- Designated: 9 October 1981
- Reference no.: 1010057

Listed Building – Grade I
- Official name: Monk Bretton Priory remains
- Designated: 6 February 1952
- Reference no.: 1151178

Monk Bretton Priory is a ruined medieval priory located in the village of Lundwood, and close to Monk Bretton, South Yorkshire, England.

== History ==
Originally a monastery under the Cluniac order, Monk Bretton Priory is located in the village of Lundwood, in the borough of Barnsley, England. It was founded in 1154 as the Priory of St. Mary Magdelene of Lund by Adam Fitswane, sited on the Lund, from Old Norse. In the course of time, the priory took the name of the nearby village of Bretton to be commonly known as Monk Bretton Priory.

== The Notton bequest ==
John de Birthwaite was Prior of Monk Bretton in 1350. In that year Sir William de Notton, a powerful local landowner, who was later Lord Chief Justice of Ireland, and his wife Isabel, conveyed to him lands at Fishlake, Monk Bretton, Moseley and Woolley. The purpose of the grant was to build a chantry chapel at Woolley Church. Notton directed that prayers were to be said for the souls of himself, Isabel, their children, and also King Edward III, Queen Philippa of Hainault and their children. The date suggests that Notton made the grant as his way of giving thanks for England's deliverance from the first outbreak of the Black Death.

== Dissolution ==
The monastery closed on 30 November 1538 during the dissolution, and the site passed into the ownership of the Blithman family. In 1580 the land was again sold to George Talbot, 6th Earl of Shrewsbury who gave the estate to his fourth son Henry on his marriage to Elizabeth Rayner. The site is a Scheduled Ancient Monument and is now in the care of English Heritage.

Excavations concentrating on the church and cloister took place on the site in the 1920s which were published by the Yorkshire Archaeological Society and other largely unrecorded diggings by the Ministry of Works took place during the 1950s. More recently the site has been the focus of a survey and excavation project run by Dr Hugh Willmott from the University of Sheffield.

== See also ==
- Grade I listed buildings in South Yorkshire
- Listed buildings in Monk Bretton
