= Frowyk =

Frowyk is a surname. Notable people with the surname include:

- John Frowyk (died 1359), English-born Irish cleric and judge
- Sir Thomas Frowyk (c. 1460–1506), English justice
