= Henry de Motlowe =

Irish judge

Henry de Motlowe (died 1361) was an English-born judge who briefly held office as Lord Chief Justice of Ireland.

He was born in Cheshire, to a family from Nether Alderley. His surname suggests that there was also a family link with the village of Mobberley, five miles from Alderley, which was called Motburlege in the Domesday Book. He owned lands at Church Lawton, (then known as Bog-Lawton): in 1338 one Ralph de Lawton gave a quitclaim (i.e. a formal renunciation of his own claim) for all lands which were held in Church Lawton by Henry and his heirs.

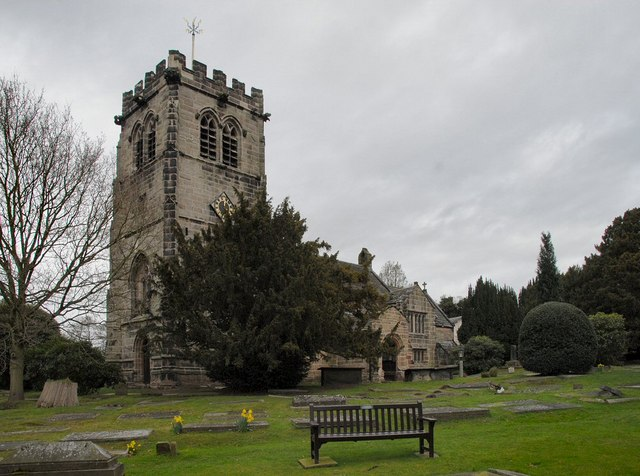
St. Mary's Church, Nether Alderley, where de Motlowe's family originated

He was already a senior official of the English Crown by 1346, when he appears on a commission in London to investigate the forgery of the Royal seal. In the same year he was appointed Lord Chief Justice of Ireland but seems to have spent no more than a few months in that office, since he was replaced in the same year by John de Rednesse, and he is shortly afterwards heard of as a member of a Commission of Oyer and Terminer in Derbyshire.

In 1357 he was made a judge of the Court of Common Pleas, and in the same year, he sat on another royal commission, to investigate an alleged affray between Simon Warde, a servant of John Gynwell, Bishop of Lincoln and certain members of the Order of Hospitallers, on whom Warde had been attempting to serve a summons to appear in a lawsuit. Ironically the future Prior of the Hospitallers, Richard de Wirkeley, who together with the then Prior, John Paveley, allegedly instigated the affray, had also been Lord Chief Justice of Ireland: the commission included yet another Irish Chief Justice, William de Notton.

Motlowe died in 1361.

Legal offices
Preceded by John le Hunt	Lord Chief Justice of the King's Bench for Ireland; 1346	Succeeded by John de Rednesse
