= Fishlake =

Village and civil parish in South Yorkshire, England

Coordinates: 53.612°N 1.012°W

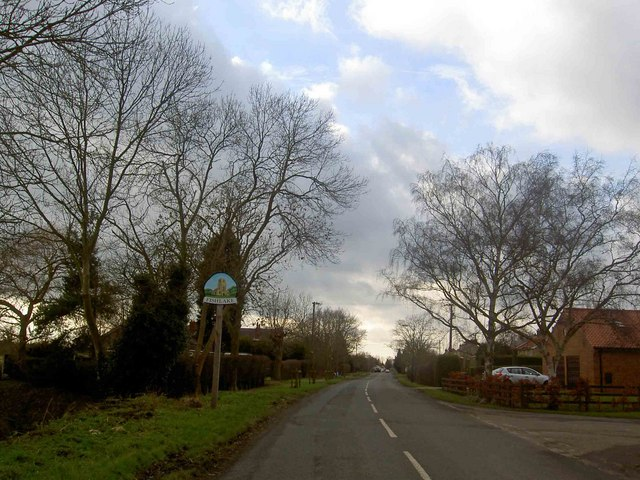
- Entering Fishlake from the east

- Location within South Yorkshire
- Population: 682 (2011 census)
- Civil parish: Fishlake
- Metropolitan borough: Doncaster
- Metropolitan county: South Yorkshire
- Region: Yorkshire and the Humber
- Country: England
- Sovereign state: United Kingdom
- Post town: DONCASTER
- Postcode district: DN7
- Dialling code: 01302
- Police: South Yorkshire
- Fire: South Yorkshire
- Ambulance: Yorkshire
- UK Parliament: Doncaster North

Fishlake is a village and civil parish in the Metropolitan Borough of Doncaster. It was historically part of the West Riding of Yorkshire until 1974. In 2001 it had a population of 628, increasing to 682 at the 2011 census. It was mentioned in the Domesday Book where the name is given as fiscelac, from Old English fisc-lacu, 'fish-stream'.

== History ==
There is a local myth called "The Cockatrice of Church Street". The story goes that the mythical beast resides near the churchyard; those unlucky enough to hear its call are said to never sleep again.

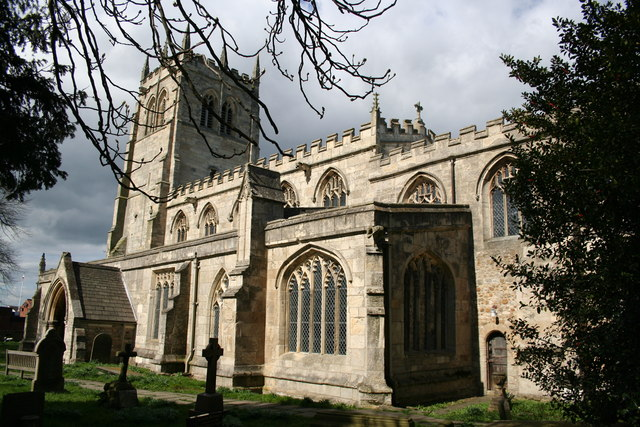
St Cuthbert's church

The local church, dedicated to St Cuthbert, is Grade I listed. Most of the building dates from the 14th and 15th centuries, while parts (namely the southern door) can be traced back to the 12th century when England was under Norman rule. According to legends, Cuthbert was buried here.

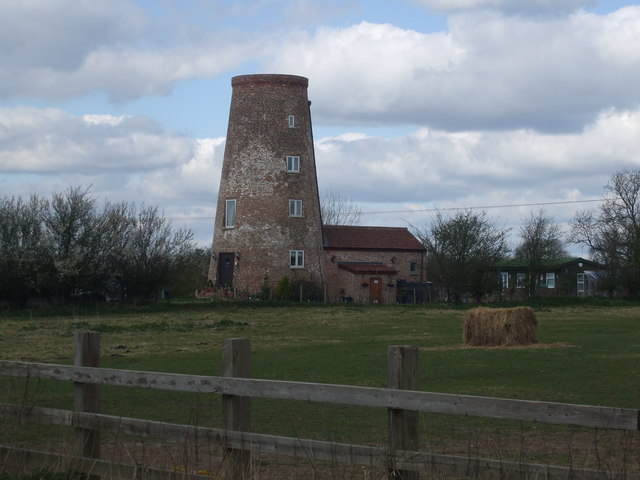
West Nab Mill, Fishlake

Sir William de Notton, later Lord Chief Justice of Ireland, was Lord of the Manor of Fishlake in the 1340s. In 1350 he and his wife Isabel conveyed it to John de Birthwaite, the Prior of Monk Bretton Priory, to build a chantry chapel at Woolley Church, where prayers were to be said for the souls of the royal family as well as Notton's own family. The timing of the grant suggests that Notton was giving thanks for England's deliverance from the first outbreak of the Black Death.

=== 2019 Floods ===
In November 2019 the village of Fishlake gained national notoriety as the River Don, swollen by unprecedented rainfall, overtopped and flooded a huge swathe of land including over 170 homes and businesses.

As a way of thanking the people and agencies who helped them, as well as raising funds for other communities affected by flooding, the people of Fishlake decided to document their experiences of the floods in the form of a book entitled Flood: The stories of a village underwater.

The book was launched in St Cuthbert's church in the village on 19 September 2021 in the presence of a number of notable dignitaries, including the Mayor of South Yorkshire, Dan Jarvis; Mayor of Doncaster, Ros Jones and local MP and Shadow President of the COP26 conference, Ed Miliband.

== See also ==
- Listed buildings in Fishlake
