= Richard de Wirkeley =

English-born cleric

Richard de Wirkeley (died after 1357) was an English-born cleric who was Prior of the Order of Hospitallers in Ireland and held office very briefly as Lord Chief Justice of Ireland.

Little is known of his early years. De Wirkeley was a fairly common name in Yorkshire in that era; it may indicate a connection with the town of Wakefield. He had entered the Order's English house by 1353. In 1354 he was sent to Ireland as Prior of the Order's Irish house at Kilmainham. In 1356 he was chosen to replace John de Rednesse as Lord Chief Justice, on the grounds that Rednesse had given offence to the Crown, by going to England "without the King's licence"; but King Edward III quickly changed his mind and reappointed Rednesse. Wirkeley seems to have resented his removal from office, since the King issued an injunction ordering him not to meddle in the matter any further.

The incident suggests that de Wirkeley was a somewhat turbulent individual. This is confirmed by an episode which occurred the following year, when the King appointed a commission to investigate an allegation that Simon Warde, a servant to John Gynwell, Bishop of Lincoln, had been assaulted by Wirkeley and other members of his Order, including John Paveley, Prior of the Order's English house from 1358, on whom Warde had been attempting to serve a summons to appear in a lawsuit. It is notable that the commission included two men, Henry de Motlowe and William de Notton, who like Wirkeley served as Lord Chief Justice of Ireland. As often in this era, the result of the inquiry seems to have been inconclusive.

In fairness to Wirkeley, it should be remembered that the Hospitallers were a fighting Order. The Prior was as much a soldier as a cleric, and accustomed to taking firm action to defend his Order's interests, and a Prior who failed to display sufficient martial spirit was open to criticism.

His date of death is unknown.

Legal offices
Preceded by John de Rednesse	Lord Chief Justice of the King's Bench for Ireland; 1356	Succeeded by John de Rednesse
