= Paveley =

Paveley is a surname. Notable people with the surname include:

- John Paveley (died 1371), Grand Prior of the Order of Knights of the Hospital of Saint John of Jerusalem
- Walter Paveley (1319–1375), English knight, founder of the Order of the Garter
