= Godfrey de Foljambe =

Member of the Parliament of England

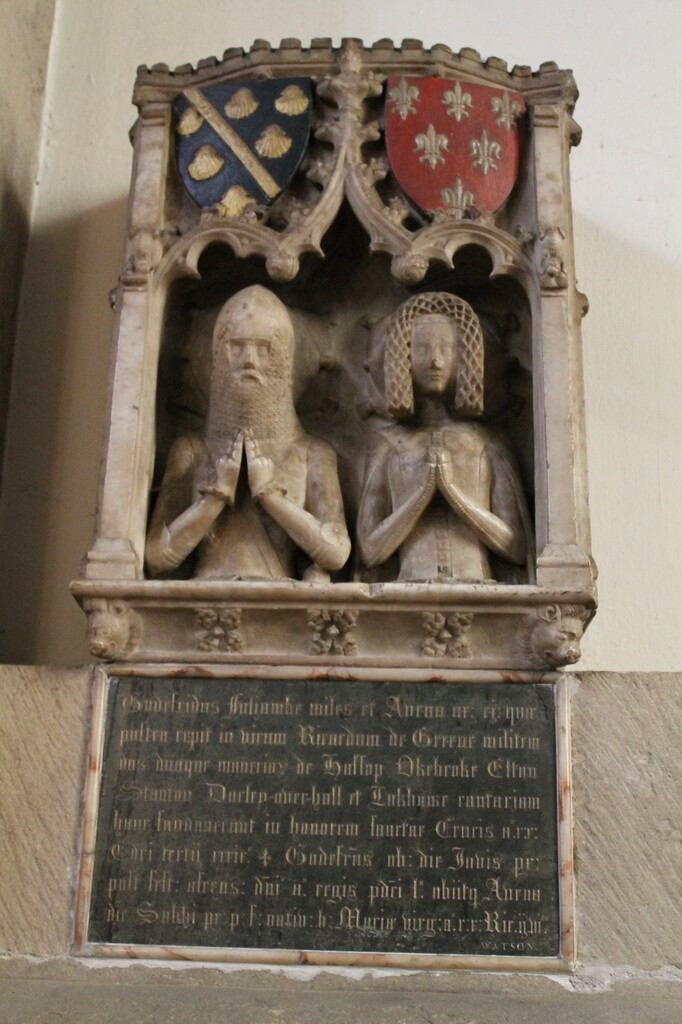
The Foljambe monument in All Saints’ Church in Bakewell, Derbyshire

Sir Godfrey de Foljambe (1317–29 May 1376, Bakewell, Derbyshire) was a landowner and politician in fourteenth-century England, who was a Baron of the Exchequer and chief steward of the duchy of Lancaster. He went on to have a successful career as an Irish judge, including three years as Lord Chief Justice of Ireland. He was initially a servant of Philippa of Hainault before becoming a prominent member of the affinity of her son, John of Gaunt, Duke of Lancaster. His tomb can still be seen at All Saints Church, Bakewell.

== Life ==
He was born in Tideswell, Derbyshire in 1317, the fourth son of Sir Thomas de Foljambe (ca. 1282 - ca. 1326) and Alice Foljambe. The Foljambe family were Lords of the Manor of Tideswell and also held lands at Darley Dale. Godfrey succeeded to the family estates after the death of his three elder brothers, Thomas de Foljambe (born ca. 1300), Lord John de Foljambe (born ca. 1300, died 4 August 1358), and Hugh de Foljambe (born ca. 1310). He also acquired the manor of Bakewell, where he founded a chantry.

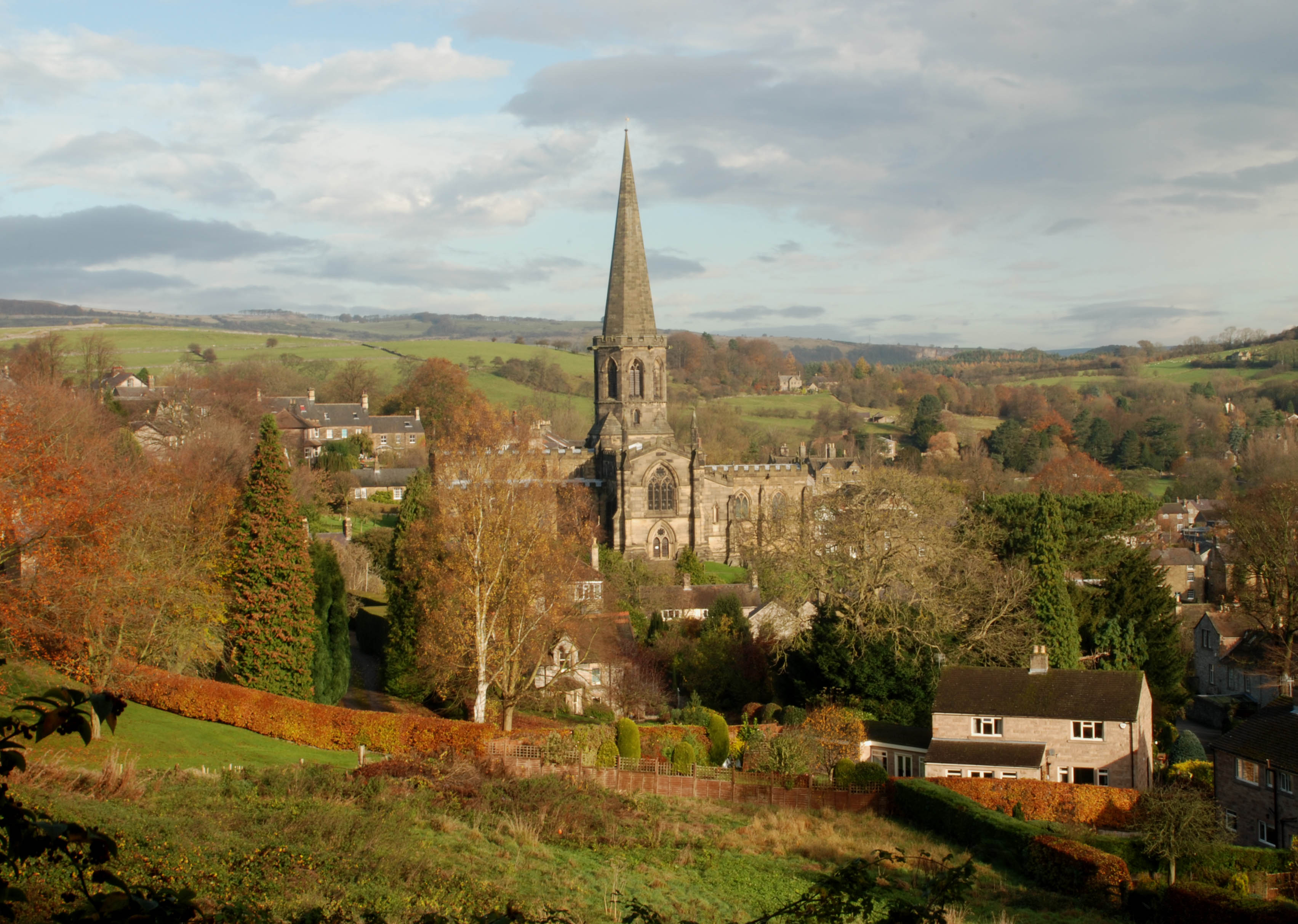
All Saints’ Church, Bakewell

He sat in the House of Commons as knight of the shire for Derbyshire in several of the Parliaments of King Edward III. In 1344 he went to Ireland as a Baron of the Court of Exchequer (Ireland), and was quickly transferred to the Court of King's Bench (Ireland). He was very much the personal choice of Sir Ralph d'Ufford, the Justiciar of Ireland, who in his short period as Governor General (1344-6) sought to pack the Irish administration with his own men. He served as Lord Chief Justice of Ireland from 1351 to 1354.

On his return to England, he sat regularly on commissions for the peace in Derbyshire and Lancashire. He enjoyed the trust and confidence of John of Gaunt, for whom he acted in numerous administrative capacities, including steward for the Duchy of Lancaster. In his later years, he drew an annuity of £40 in addition to his salary from Gaunt. For a number of years he held a lease on a substantial part of Newcastle-under-Lyme for which he paid £127 p.a. to John of Gaunt. He died 29 May 1376, Bakewell, Derbyshire.

== Marriage and descendants ==
He married (possibly his second marriage, though little is known of the first), Avena Ireland (1320-13 December 1382), a daughter of Sir Thomas Ireland of Hartshorne in Derbyshire, by whom he had several sons, including Godfrey Foljambe (born ca. 1344 died 29 May 1376, Darley, Derbyshire), Geoffrey Foljambe the younger (died 1375), Richard Foljambe (born ca. 1348, Hassop, Derbyshire) and Thomas Foljambe (born ca. 1355, Walton, Derbyshire died 1433, Tideswell, Derbyshire), who inherited the family estates after the premature death of his young nephew. He also had at least one daughter Margery, who married firstly Richard Baskerville of Eardisley, Herefordshire, and secondly Nicholas de Montgomery. Among his descendants were Sir Francis Foljambe (died 1640), the first and last of the Foljambe baronets, and the Earls of Liverpool, second creation.

== Monument ==
The mural alabaster monument to Godfrey and Avena is said to be of a very rare kind, with only two examples surviving to the present day. The Foljambe mural shows Foljambe and his wife as if they are looking out of a window and this can still be seen on the south wall of All Saints’ Church in Bakewell. Below the mural is an explanatory inscription that dates from 1803 and was "added by Mr Blore".

Legal offices
Preceded by John de Rednesse	Lord Chief Justice of the King's Bench for Ireland; 1351-54	Succeeded by John de Rednesse
