= John de Rednesse =

English-born judge

Lord Chief Justice of Ireland
- In office 1346–1351
- Preceded by: Henry de Motlowe
- Succeeded by: Godfrey de Foljambe
- In office 1356–1354
- Preceded by: Godfrey de Foljambe
- Succeeded by: Richard de Wirkeley
- In office 1356–1359
- Preceded by: Richard de Wirkeley
- Succeeded by: William le Petit
- In office 1359–1361
- Preceded by: William le Petit
- Succeeded by: William de Notton

Personal details
- Born: before 1327
- Died: after 1386
- Parent: Stephen de Rednesse (father)

John de Rednesse (died after 1386) was an English-born judge who served four times as Lord Chief Justice of Ireland.

He was the son of Stephen de Rednesse, whose family took their name from the village of Reedness in the then West Riding of Yorkshire. He is first heard of in 1327 when he received a royal pardon for killing one of his servants. He is unlikely to have been more than twenty at the time, since he was still alive almost sixty years later. Between 1335 and 1342 he served as Commissioner for the Peace in Yorkshire.

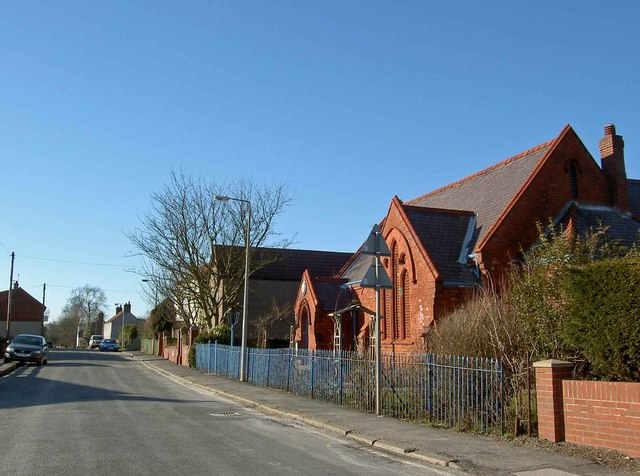
Modern-day Reedness, John's birthplace

He came to Ireland in 1344 as a justice of the Court of King's Bench. In 1346, he was appointed Lord Chief Justice; he was later demoted to second justice of the King's Bench, and was then reappointed Chief Justice. In all, he served four terms as Lord Chief Justice. Such rapid changes of personnel on the medieval Irish bench were not uncommon, but they normally resulted from a clash between rivals for office; in Rednesse's case, unusually, he was replaced on each occasion by a different man. In his later years, a rival emerged in the person of Richard de Wirkeley, Prior of the Order of Hospitallers, who was appointed Lord Chief Justice in May 1356 after Rednesse, as stated in the Royal warrant appointing Wirkeley, had given offence to the King by going to England without licence. However, Wirkeley was quickly replaced by Rednesse again and was ordered by King Edward III not to intermeddle with the office. In 1346, Rednesse was appointed to a commission to inquire into recent disturbances in Ulster. In 1359, we have further glimpses of his judicial work, when he was one of three judges empanelled to hear a case of novel disseisin between Thomas Norragh and John l'Enfaunt, and a similar case brought by Nicholas Longspy. In 1358, he sat on a commission of oyer and terminer with John Frowyk, the Lord Chancellor of Ireland, Sir Thomas de Rokeby the younger and others, to inquire into the actions of those of the King's subjects who had sold arms and victuals to the King's enemies, or treacherously adhered to those enemies.

Like many officials of the time, Rednesse complained about non-payment of his salary, and in 1358 he felt strongly enough about the matter to issue a writ of certiorari. At the King's request, the Exchequer of Ireland inquired into the matter, and confirmed that Rednesse was indeed owed £94 in arrears, which was duly paid. In March 1361, by way of further compensation for the non-payment of his salary, he was given the manor of Termonfeckin, County Louth.

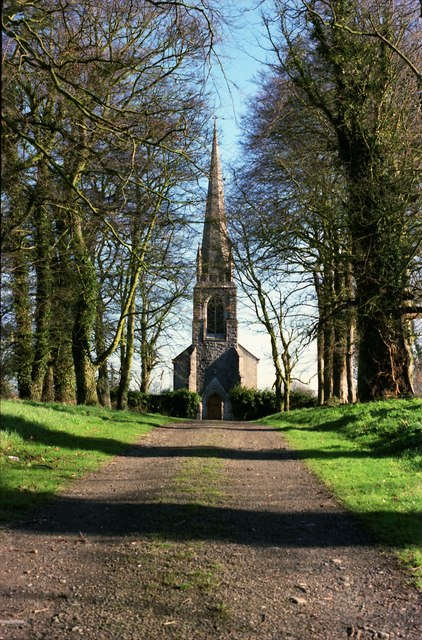
Termonfeckin

Rednesse was finally removed from office later the same year. He returned to England, where he spent his later years in his native Yorkshire. He served as a Commissioner for the Peace in 1374. In 1386, by which time he must have been far advanced in years, he was one of several local landowners who were asked to conduct an inquiry into the illegal digging of a watercourse in the Holderness region of the East Riding of Yorkshire, which was causing a nuisance.

Legal offices
Preceded by Henry de Motlowe	Lord Chief Justice of Ireland; 1346-51	Succeeded by Godfrey de Foljambe
Preceded by Godfrey de Foljambe	Lord Chief Justice of Ireland; 1354-56	Succeeded by Richard de Wirkeley
Preceded by Richard de Wirkeley	Lord Chief Justice of Ireland; 1356-59	Succeeded by William le Petit
Preceded by William le Petit	Lord Chief Justice of Ireland; 1359-61	Succeeded by William de Notton
