= Listed buildings in Fishlake =

Fishlake is a civil parish in the metropolitan borough of Doncaster, South Yorkshire, England. The parish contains 13 listed buildings that are recorded in the National Heritage List for England. Of these, one is listed at Grade I, the highest of the three grades, and the others are at Grade II, the lowest grade. The parish contains the village of Fishlake and the surrounding area. The listed buildings include a church, the remains of two medieval crosses, houses and cottages, a farmhouse, farm buildings, two former windmills, a road bridge, and a pinfold.

== Key ==
Grade	Criteria
I	Particularly important buildings of more than special interest
II	Buildings of national importance and special interest

== Buildings ==
Name and location	Photograph	Date	Notes	Grade
St Cuthbert's Church; 53.61104°N 1.00943°W		12th century	The church was extended and altered through the years, particularly in the 14th and 15th centuries, and it was restored in 1854–57. It is built in magnesian limestone, and has roofs of lead and Welsh slate. The church consists of a nave with a clerestory, north and south aisles, a chancel with a north organ chamber and a south chapel, and a west tower embraced by the aisles. The tower has four stages, angle buttresses, and a west doorway with a pointed arch, over which is a large five-light window. In the third stage is a niche containing a statue of St Cuthbert under a crocketed canopy, and in the top stage are two-light bell openings, a clock face, gargoyles, and an embattled parapet with eight crocketed pinnacles. The south doorway dates from the 12th century, and has four orders elaborately decorated with carvings of foliage, heads, animals and figures.	I
Medieval cross 53.61283°N 1.01851°W		Late medieval	The remains of the cross stand by the junction with Far Bank Lane, and are in magnesian limestone. They consist of a square socket stone with domed chamfer stops on each corner, and a shaft with elongated pyramidal chamfer stops.	II
Village cross 53.61090°N 1.01091°W		Late medieval	The cross, which has been re-set on three later steps, is by the junction with Pinfold Lane, and is in magnesian limestone. It has a square base with a deep chamfer, and an octagonal boss. The shaft is square, tapering and chamfered. On the south side is a benchmark.	II
2 River View; 53.61070°N 1.01068°W	—	Early to mid 18th century	A red brick house on a rendered plinth, with a floor band, a moulded eaves cornice, and a pantile roof with a coped gable and scrolled kneelers on the left. There are two storeys and an attic, and three bays. In the centre is a doorway with a fanlight, above which is a panel with an armorial crest, and the windows are sashes.	II
The Lilacs and outbuilding 53.61386°N 1.01139°W	—	1742	The house and the outbuilding on the left are in red brick, with dentilled eaves courses, and pantile roofs with coped gables and shaped kneelers. The house has two storeys and three bays, and a central segmental-arched doorway with a dated keystone. The windows are casements with keystones, and the window above the doorway is blocked. The outbuilding contains two doorways, a horizontally-sliding sash window, lozenge-shaped vents, and two hatches.	II
Farm building range, Manor Farm; 53.61313°N 1.01720°W	—	Mid 18th century	A combination farm building, it is in red brick with a pantile roof. It consists of a two-storey L-shaped range including stables, a cowhouse with a hayloft, and a four-bay barn with a three-bay return. On the east side are two single-storey three-bay open-fronted sheds.	II
Windmill, Mill House Farm; 53.61824°N 1.02134°W		18th century	The remains of the windmill are in red brick, partly roughcast. They consist of a two-storey cone containing a doorway and segmental-arched windows.	II
The Hall Farmhouse; 53.61098°N 1.01198°W	—	Mid 18th century	The farmhouse is in red brick on a plinth, with rusticated quoins, a floor band, a moulded eaves cornice, and a pantile roof with coped gables and kneelers. There are two storeys, five bays, the middle three bays projecting, a two-storey extension receded on the left, and a rear wing. Above the central doorway is a re-set dated plaque, and the windows are casements with double keystones.	II
Vine Cottage; 53.61382°N 1.01063°W	—	Mid to late 18th century	A red brick house with cogged eaves, and a pantile roof with coped gables and shaped kneelers. There are two storeys, five bays, and a single-storey extension on the right. On the front are two segmental-arched doorways, one blocked. The windows in the ground floor and in the extension are casements, and in the upper floor are horizontally-sliding sash windows.	II
Stainforth Bridge; 53.60169°N 1.03296°W		1768	The road bridge carries Fishlake Nab over the River Don. It is in sandstone and consists of two segmental arches. The central pier has triangular cutwaters rising to pedestrian refuges. The bridge has voussoirs, a chamfered band, and coped parapets, the parapet and abutment walls angled out.	II
1, 3 and 5 Church Street; 53.61074°N 1.01026°W	—	Late 18th century	A row of three red brick houses on a plinth, with an eaves band, and a pantile roof with coped gables and kneelers. There are two storeys and seven bays. The doorways have fanlights, and the windows are sashes.	II
Windmill west of Stony Lane; 53.61027°N 1.01737°W		Early 19th century	The remains of the windmill are in red brick, and consist of a truncated cone with four storeys. The building contains a doorway on the south side, and square-headed openings in each floor.	II
Pinfold; 53.61266°N 1.01131°W		Early to mid 19th century	The pinfold is a rectangular enclosure surrounded by a red brick wall with copings in limestone and sandstone. The wall is about 1.75 metres (5 ft 9 in) high, and has a gate opening on the southeast side.	II
