= Listed buildings in Woolley, West Yorkshire =

Woolley is a civil parish in the metropolitan borough of the City of Wakefield, West Yorkshire, England. The parish contains 38 listed buildings that are recorded in the National Heritage List for England. Of these, one is listed at Grade I, the highest of the three grades, one is at Grade II*, the middle grade, and the others are at Grade II, the lowest grade. The parish contains the village of Woolley and the surrounding area. Apart from the Grade I listed church, the most important building in the parish is Woolley Hall, which is listed together with associated structures and items in its grounds. The other listed buildings include items in the churchyard, houses, cottages and associated structures, farmhouses and farm buildings, some of which have been converted into dwellings, a sheep dip, former schools, and a water cistern cover.

== Key ==
Grade	Criteria
I	Buildings of exceptional interest, sometimes considered to be internationally important
II*	Particularly important buildings of more than special interest
II	Buildings of national importance and special interest

== Buildings ==
Name and location	Photograph	Date	Notes	Grade
Pair of tomb chests 53.61260°N 1.51864°W	—	Pre-Norman (possible)	The two shrine-like tomb chests are in the churchyard of St Peter's Church to the south of the church. They have sandstone bases and gabled thick stone slate roofs with Gothic moulded coping.	II
Cross base 53.61263°N 1.51882°W	—	Medieval (probable)	The cross base in the churchyard of St Peter's Church, is in dressed freestone. It consists of a circular base, in which is sunk a short section of the square shaft of a cross.	II
St Peter's Church; 53.61272°N 1.51871°W		15th century	The south aisle was added in the 16th century, and the church was restored in 1870–71 by J. L. Pearson. It is built in stone with stone roofs, and is in Perpendicular style. The church consists of a nave, north and south aisles, a south porch, a chancel with north and south chapels, and a west tower. The tower has two stages, diagonal buttresses, a west doorway, a three-light west window, a clock face on the north, and an embattled parapet with corner and central crocketed pinnacles.	I
The Old Court House; 53.61390°N 1.51528°W	—	Mid 16th century	A timber framed house encased in stone in the 17th century, and later altered and extended. The roof is in stone slate, with coped gables, kneelers, and, at the rear are lantern finials. There are two storeys, a front range of three bays, and two parallel gabled ranges at the rear. On the front, the windows vary, and at the rear are four mullioned windows, one also with transoms, and with a hood mould over the ground floor windows.	II
Woolley Hall; 53.61339°N 1.50721°W		c. 1635	A country house that was later extended, and then used for other purposes, it is in stone with quoins, and a stone slate roof. Part of the house has two storeys, basements and attics, part has three storeys, and there is an H-shaped plan. The centre has three bays, flanked by projecting wings with two bays and shaped gables, outside which are wings projecting further, also with shaped gables.	II*
Moorhouse Farmhouse; 53.60708°N 1.54008°W	—	Late 17th century	The farmhouse, later a private house, was extended to the rear in the 19th century. It is in stone with quoins and a stone slate roof. There are two storeys, three bays, and a rear extension. The doorway has a chamfered surround, and a stepped hood mould continued over the ground floor windows. The windows are mullioned, with some mullions removed.	II
Stuart House; 53.61169°N 1.50847°W	—	Late 17th century	Originally a dower house, it has been altered and extended. The house is in stone, and has a stone slate roof with a coped gable on the left. There are two storeys and attics, and four bays, the right bay later and projecting. In the original part is a three-light mullioned window with a moulded hood mould. To the left is a projecting bay on a chamfered column containing a canted oriel window and a parapet, and in the roof are three dormers. The entrance has a porch with a Tudor-style doorway, and on the right return is a canted bay window.	II
The Old Vicarage; 53.61420°N 1.51486°W	—	Late 17th century	The vicarage, later a private house, was later altered and extended, including a new entrance front in about 1810. The house is in stone with quoins and stone slate roofs. There are three parts. At the front is a part with two storeys, three bays and a hipped roof. In the centre is a large square porch with Tuscan pilasters, a frieze and a cornice, and sash windows. To the left is a part with two storeys, three bays and a separate hipped roof. It contains a central doorway and sash windows. At the rear, the section to the left has two storeys and to the right the oldest section has three storeys and two coped gables with kneelers. There are two French windows, a two-light mullioned window, and sash windows.	II
1 and 2 The Green; 53.61478°N 1.51641°W		c. 1718	A school, later a private house, it is in stone with quoins, and a stone slate roof with coped gables and shaped kneelers. There are three bays. The left bay has a single storey and a hipped roof, the middle bay has two storeys, and contains a doorway with composite jambs and a deep lintel with a chamfered surround, and the right bay is taller, with two storeys, and contains a doorway with a quoined lintel. The windows are mullioned.	II
Pair of raised grave slabs 53.61259°N 1.51874°W	—	c. 1707	The pair of grave slabs in the churchyard of St Peter's church to the south of the porch are to the memory of Susanna and Anne, wives of Robert Fretwell. One grave slab has a carved circular motif with a floral border surmounted by a trumpeting angel.	II
Mount Farmhouse; 53.61228°N 1.51405°W	—	1719	The house is in stone on a chamfered plinth, with chamfered quoins, a moulded band, a moulded eaves cornice, and a two-span Welsh blue slate roof with coped gables and kneelers. There are two storeys and attics, a double-depth plan, a symmetrical front of three bays, and an attached gabled outbuilding on the left. Steps lead up to the central doorway that has an architrave, a fanlight, and a cornice on consoles. The windows have architraves, those in the ground floor are sashes and in the upper floor they are casements.	II
Gatepiers and wall, Mount Farmhouse; 53.61228°N 1.51422°W	—	1719 (probable)	The gate piers and walls at the front of the house are in stone, and the walls are coped. The piers have pilasters, and each pier has a base with a moulded foot and cornice, and at the top is a cornice surmounted by an obelisk finial. At the sides of the piers are carved consoles, and the gates are in cast iron.	II
Pair of raised grave slabs 53.61259°N 1.51888°W	—	c. 1723	The pair of grave slabs in the churchyard of St Peter's church to the south of the tower are to the memory of George Wildsmith and George Stringer. Both have channelled borders with semicircular-arched heads, and one has winged-head spandrels and a carved heart motif.	II
Orchard Cottage; 53.61248°N 1.51451°W	—	Early 18th century	Two cottages later altered and combined, the building is in stone with quoins, and stone slate roofs with coped gables and kneelers. There are two storeys and four bays. One of the doorways has a deep lintel, and the other has a round-ached head. Some windows are mullioned, and one has a round-arched head. On the right return, external steps lead to an upper floor doorway that has monolithic jambs.	II
Sheep dip 53.61198°N 1.51419°W	—	18th century	The sheep dip is a rectangular walled enclosure in stone, with a north entrance and a south exit. The exit leads to a trough with a groove for an overflow, and there is an exit channel.	II
Gatepiers, The Old Court House; 53.61401°N 1.51509°W	—	Mid 18th century	The gate piers flanking the entrance to the grounds are in stone with circular drums. Each pier has a moulded cornice and a blocking course at the top, and is surmounted by a ball finial.	II
Ice house, Woolley Hall; 53.61529°N 1.49644°W	—	Mid 18th century	The ice house is in orange-red brick and stone. It has a circular plan, and is entered on the north side through a brick-arched opening, with flanking walls. It has a vaulted roof covered in earth. The ice house is surrounded by the remains of wrought iron fencing.	II
Oak Villa; 53.61267°N 1.51475°W	—	Mid to late 18th century	A stone house with a stone slate roof, two storeys and three bays. The doorway has monolithic jambs, the windows have altered glazing, and at the rear is an inserted French window.	II
Barn, Beech Farm; 53.61339°N 1.51820°W	—	Late 18th century	The barn is in stone, with a hipped stone slate roof, and ten bays. It contains two segmental-arched cart entries on each front, and arrow-slit vents.	II
5–11 The Courtyard; 53.61386°N 1.51574°W	—	Late 18th century	A group of farm buildings converted into dwellings, they are in stone and some brick, with quoins, roofs of stone slate, slate and pantile, and they form a U-shaped plan with three ranges around a courtyard. The main range has a three-storey dovecote tower containing a blocked elliptical-arched cart entry, a Venetian window at the front, and a Diocletian window at the rear. Flanking it are two-storey blocks, with four bays on the left and five on the right. At the left end is a linking L-shaped range with two storeys and three bays, and at right angles to its left is a single-storey range with seven bays.	II
Coach house, The Old Vicarage; 53.61442°N 1.51474°W	—	Late 18th century	The coach house is in stone, and has a stone slate roof with coped gables and kneelers. There are two storeys and four bays. The coach house contains an elliptical-arched cart entry with tie-stone jambs, two doorways, one with a chamfered surround, and sash windows, some of which are blocked.	II
Fountain basin, Woolley Hall; 53.61295°N 1.50820°W	—	c. 1795–1807	The fountain basin in the garden of the hall is in stone. It consists of a large circular basin with a moulded surround.	II
Walled garden walls and gate piers, Woolley Hall; 53.61343°N 1.51221°W	—	c. 1795–1805	The walls enclosing the rectangular garden are in red brick with stone coping. The central entrance in the south wall has rusticated stone piers, each with a moulded cornice, a blocking course, and a finial. In the north, west and east walls are doorways with composite jambs and monolithic lintels.	II
Former Sunday School and stable 53.61449°N 1.51487°W	—	c. 1796	The former stable with a Sunday school above is in stone, with quoins, and a stone slate roof with coped gables and kneelers, and two storeys. In the ground floor is a central doorway flanked by windows. To the right the stable door, now blocked, has composite jambs and a quoined lintel. The upper floor contains a taking-in door flanked by window, and in the left return, external steps lead up to a doorway with monolithic jambs.	II
Barn northeast of Mount Farmhouse; 53.61251°N 1.51380°W	—	c. 1800	A stone barn with a hipped stone slate roof and seven bays. It contains segmental-arched cart entries with composite jambs, doorways with tie-stone jambs, and square pitching holes.	II
North stable block, Woolley Hall; 53.61384°N 1.50597°W	—	c. 1808–10	The stable block is in stone on a plinth, with a sill band, and a hipped stone slate roof. There are two storeys, and a U-shaped plan with a north range of nine bays, and east and west wings with seven bays. The middle bay of the north range projects under a pedimented gable containing a heraldic plaque in the tympanum. In the ground floor is a round-arched doorway and above it is a Diocletian window. The outer bays project slightly, and contain round-arched recesses, and the windows are sashes. On the roof is a clock tower with an open rotunda, a lead dome, and a weathervane with a crest. The middle three bays in both wings project under open pedimented gables.	II
South stable block, walls, mounting block and gate piers, Woolley Hall; 53.61358°N 1.50572°W	—	c. 1810	The stable block, now used for other purposes, was designed by Thomas Taylor. It is in stone on a plinth, with a frieze, and a cornice and blocking course. There is a single storey and a symmetrical front of eleven bays, the middle three bays projecting and containing semicircular arches, now glazed. In the outer bays are doorways with fanlights, and sash windows. At the right end is an attached gate pier with banded rustication and curved coping. In front of the building is a mounting block, and a double flight of steps, under which is a dog kennel.	II
Lodge, walls, piers, and gates, Woolley Hall; 53.61560°N 1.49449°W	—	1820	The lodge at the east entrance to the grounds of the hall was designed by Jeffry Wyatville and is now a ruin. The stone gate piers have Doric pilasters, a frieze, a cornice, and a blocking course. Flanking these are smaller ornamental pedestrian gateways with quadrant walls and piers with shaped tops. The ornamental gates are in cast iron.	II
1 and 2 Home Farm Yard; 53.61225°N 1.50955°W	—	Early 19th century	A house, later divided, in stone, with a hipped stone slate roof. There are two storeys and a front of five bays, the middle bay projecting under a shaped gable with a ball finial. In the middle bay is a porch, the outer bays contain semicircular-arched recesses, and the windows are sashes.	II
Cloisters north of barn, Home Farm; 53.61315°N 1.50967°W	—	Early 19th century	The cloisters enclose three sides of a courtyard. They are in stone with columns and arches in freestone and brick, and stone slate roofs. The western range has three semicircular brick arches on square columns and seven Tuscan columns. In the north range are ten bays of columns, some blocked and some glazed, and the eastern range has seven bays of columns and a lean-to roof.	II
Dovecote, Home Farm; 53.61267°N 1.50974°W	—	Early 19th century	The dovecote, later used for other purposes, is in stone with quoins, a band, and a pyramidal stone slate roof. There are two storeys and a square plan. It contains an inserted garage door, over which is a window with a projecting sill.	II
Gate piers at junction with New Road; 53.61355°N 1.51446°W	—	Early 19th century	The gate piers flanking the entrance to the path leading to the walled garden are square and have channelled stonework. Each pier has a cap with a recessed rectangle containing raised circular motifs, and a chamfered cap.	II
Home Farm Cottage and Pine Lodge; 53.61249°N 1.50980°W	—	Early 19th century	A pair of farm buildings converted into dwellings, they are in stone with hipped stone slate roofs, and two storeys. Home Farm Cottage has five bays, the middle bay projecting under a gable. In the centre is a doorway with a recessed porch, narrow flanking windows and a hood mould, and above it is a semicircular-arched window. The outer bays contain arched recesses. To the right is a single-storey link to Pine Lodge. This has three bays, a central pedimented gable, and a semicircular-arched doorway.	II
The Barn; 53.61290°N 1.50950°W	—	Early 19th century	A barn converted into a dwelling, it is in stone with a hipped stone slate roof. There are two storeys and three bays, the middle bay projecting under a pedimented gable with a weathervane and containing a semicircular-arched cart entry. In each outer bay is a segmental-headed cart entry converted into a window.	II
Pair of lodges, gatepiers and gates, Woolley Hall; 53.61125°N 1.50585°W	—	Early 19th century	The pair of lodges flanking the southern entrance to the grounds of the hall are attached by cast iron pedestrian gates to gate piers. The lodges have one storey and a hexagonal plan, and the piers are quare. They are all in channelled stonework, and have plinths, moulded bands, friezes and moulded cornice. The lodges have doorways with slab hoods, windows in the canted sides, and pyramidal stone slate roofs. The piers have pilasters, and ball finials. The pedestrian and double carriage gates have circular motifs.	II
Water-cistern cover 53.61370°N 1.51343°W	—	Early 19th century|	The water cistern cover is in stone and has a hexagonal plan. On each face is an arched recessed panel, one with a wooden door. On the top is a cornice, a pyramidal roof, and a ball finial.	II
Pair of urns, Woolley Hall; 53.61272°N 1.50782°W	—	Early to mid 19th century	The urns in the garden of the hall are in carved sandstone. Each urn has a square plinth and a moulded foot, on which is a bell-shaped urn with banded decoration, including a tulip on the base and a flower head on the top. The cap has a gadrooned sun-ray pattern.	II
Wooley School; 53.61461°N 1.51689°W	—	1842	The former school is in stone on a plinth, with channelled quoin pilasters, and a Welsh blue slate roof with coped gables and kneelers. There is one storey and five bays, the right two bays have quoins, and project under a gable with a circular window in the apex. On the front of the second bay is a gabled belfry tower, containing an arched window, above which is an inscribed and dated plaque, and a louvred bell opening. The fourth bay contains a doorway with an architrave.	II
