= Listed buildings in Notton =

Notton is a civil parish in the metropolitan borough of the City of Wakefield, West Yorkshire, England. The parish contains four listed buildings that are recorded in the National Heritage List for England. All the listed buildings are designated at Grade II, the lowest of the three grades, which is applied to "buildings of national importance and special interest". The parish contains the village of Notton and the surrounding countryside. The listed buildings consist of three houses and a bridge over a railway.

== Buildings ==
Name and location	Photograph	Date	Notes
Joiner's Cottage; 53.61286°N 1.48259°W	—	Early 18th century	An upper storey was added to the house in about 1800. The ground floor is in stone, the upper floor is in brick, and the front is rendered. The house has a Welsh blue slate roof with coped gables. There are two storeys and three bays. The doorway has an architrave, one window has been inserted, and the other windows are mullioned.
Bushcliff House; 53.62066°N 1.49091°W	—	Mid 18th century	A stone house with quoins, a band, and a stone slate roof with coped gables and kneelers. There are two storeys, three bays, and a lower bay on the left. The central doorway has monolithic jambs, and the windows, which are casements, have deep lintels.
70 George Lane; 53.61353°N 1.47805°W	—	c. 1800	A stone house with quoins and a stone slate roof. There are two storeys, three bays, and a central rear wing. The doorway and windows have plain surrounds and deep lintels.
Notton Bridge; 53.61445°N 1.44862°W	—	c. 1840	The bridge was built by the North Midland Railway to carry Notton Lane over its line. It is in stone, and consists of three segmental arches. The bridge has a moulded band, a coped parapet, and projecting piers.
