= Thomas de Burley =

Irish judge

Thomas de Burley (died c.1371) was an English-born monk who served as a Crown official and judge in fourteenth-century Ireland. He held office twice as Lord Chancellor of Ireland. He was the Irish Prior of the Order of St. John of Jerusalem, whose Dublin house was at Kilmainham, from 1356 till his death. He had a reputation for corruption, and for vindictiveness towards his opponents, but he could also show courage and determination, especially in combat.

Little is known of his life before 1356, when he was appointed both Prior of Kilmainham and Lord Chancellor of Ireland. Like most of the Priors of Kilmainham in the fourteenth century he was English by birth, (a fact sometimes resented by the Irish monks), and he had entered the Order of St. John in England. He was superseded as both Prior and Chancellor by John Frowyk, but later regained both these offices. D'Alton tells us that he was Prior for "many years"; in fact, it seems to have been for about 15 years. It has been suggested that he was an unwelcome choice as Prior, but this may simply reflect his later unsavoury reputation.

The Knights of St John were a fighting Order of monks, and the Prior had long played a key role in the defence of Dublin and the Pale surrounding it. Burley, for all his faults, was well suited to a martial role. In 1359 the Privy Council ordered him to be paid £43 as a reward for his good services in defence of Dublin against the O'Tooles of County Wicklow, and mounting a punitive campaign against them, at a time when the Exchequer of Ireland simply had no money to pay for regular troops. A later entry in the Close Rolls orders payment to him of £200 for maintaining his own troops in County Meath and elsewhere "for the preservation of the peace".

He clashed with many of his judicial colleagues, notably Richard White, the Lord Chief Justice of Ireland, and numerous complaints of maladministration and corruption were made against him. He was removed as Lord Chancellor in 1364, after the Irish House of Commons sent a powerful delegation, including White and Maurice Fitzgerald, 4th Earl of Kildare, to England to complain of his misconduct; the precise complaint being that he had seriously misrepresented to King Edward III the state of affairs in Ireland. The King gave an order that the delegation should not be "troubled" for their mission on their return to Ireland; this suggests that they were afraid of reprisals from Burley or his allies, which in turn suggests that Burley had a name for being vindictive.

At Drogheda the following year he was tried before a special court, presided over by the Lord Lieutenant of Ireland, on numerous charges of bribery, corruption and theft. The jury acquitted him of all charges.

He was also preceptor of the Order's house in Shropshire.

In 1367 it was proposed to reappoint him Lord Chancellor in place of the quarrelsome and unpopular Thomas le Reve, Bishop of Lismore and Waterford. A brief power struggle developed, from which Burley emerged the victor. The same year he complained that the Order's manor at Leixlip was being wrongfully distrained for debts it did not owe. A royal warrant to revoke his appointment was issued in 1368, but it was never acted on and was later vacated. As Chancellor he was occupied with organising the defence of Dublin against the O'Tooles, whose raids on Dublin were a perennial source of worry to the Crown.

In 1367-8 the Bermingham family and their retainers began a private war in County Meath. Burley was appointed to negotiate a treaty with them, together with John Fitzrichard, High Sheriff of Meath, and Robert Tyrrel, Baron of Castleknock. A parley was arranged at Carbury but the Berminghams, in breach of the agreement, took the commissioners captive. Burley was quickly released in exchange for James Bermingham, who was then a prisoner in Trim Castle; the others were required to pay a ransom. He does not seem to have been ill-treated by his captors.

He probably died in 1371, when William Tany succeeded him as Prior.
