= Thomas de la Dale =

English-born Irish judge

Lord Chief Justice of the King's Bench for Ireland
- In office 1365–1357
- Preceded by: Richard White
- Succeeded by: John Keppock

Personal details
- Born: 1310s Little Barford, Bedfordshire, England
- Died: 1373

Sir Thomas de la Dale (c.1316–1373) was an English-born judge and landowner, who held the office of Lord Chief Justice of Ireland, and also served as Lord Deputy of Ireland.

== Biography ==
He was born at Little Barford, Bedfordshire, son of Thomas de la Dale, who married the heiress of Barford, Isabel de Leyham, daughter of Matthew de Leyham, before 1316. This Thomas apparently died in 1317, when his widow was declared owner of Barford in her own right. In 1346 "Thomas, son of Isabel" (who was almost certainly our Sir Thomas) was listed as the owner of Barford; he also inherited lands at Everton cum Tetworth in the same county. In 1358 he was exempted from the usual feudal duties of a landowner.

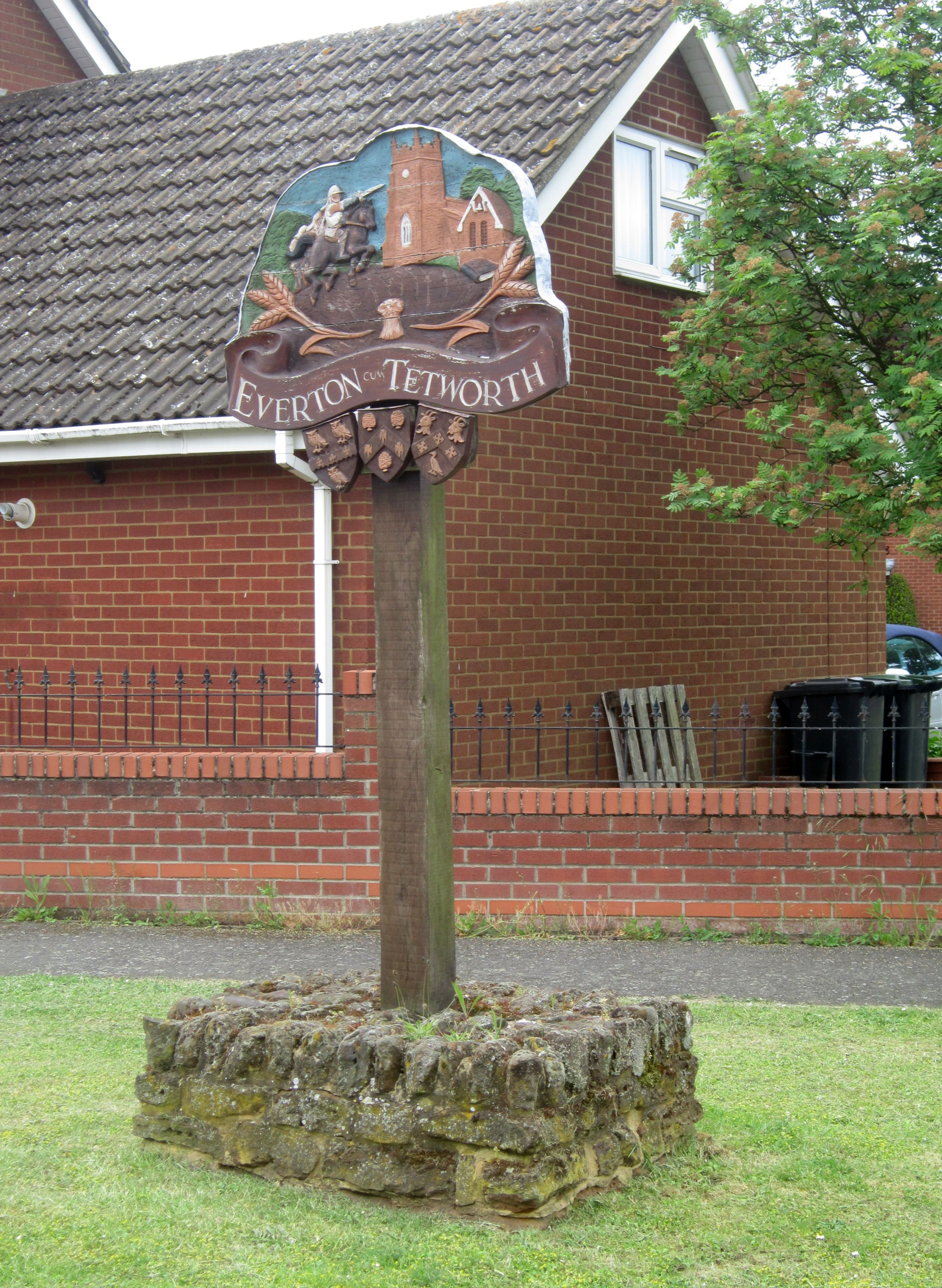
Everton cum Tetworth, Bedfordshire, present day: de la Dale was the principal landowner here in the mid-fourteenth century

== Career ==
He was sent to Ireland in 1361, in the entourage of the King's second son Lionel of Antwerp, Duke of Clarence, the Lord Lieutenant of Ireland; he remained in Ireland, apart from a few short intervals, until 1369, and was in Ireland again, acting in an unspecified capacity, in 1372. He was made Lord Chief Justice in 1365. He was also described as the "Governor of Ireland" when Lionel returned to England that year, leaving Thomas as his Deputy. He became Custos Rotulorum (Keeper of the Rolls) of Ireland in 1366, and his name appears as a witness in the Patent Rolls. In 1372 Robert Bron was made Chief Serjeant of County Carlow and County Louth on account of "his good services done in the company of Sir Thomas de la Dale, Sir William de Windsor (the Lord Lieutenant) and others".

He died in 1373: in his will he asked to be buried at Little Barford.

== Descendants ==
His son and heir, also named Sir Thomas de la Dale (died 1396), was a senior member of the household of Lionel's younger brother, John of Gaunt, Duke of Lancaster. He sometimes went by the alternative surname Fulthorpe, and was described as "a man of substance". Thomas Fulthorpe was succeeded by his son, who was another Thomas de la Dale, and seems to have died in 1407 or 1408. Fulthorpe's widow Isabel in 1408 obtained wardship and the right to arrange the marriage of her infant grandson, yet another Thomas, on payment to Ramsay Abbey of 100 marks (the Abbey was the overlord of Little Barford. This Thomas came of age in 1428 and obtained possession of the family estates, having rendered the customary feudal service.

The de la Dales owned Barford until the male line of the family died out in the sixteenth century. The last of the de la Dales, Anne, daughter of William de la Dale, married Alexander Fettiplace in 1537. Their descendants remained at Barford until 1658, when they sold it to the Edwards family.

== Sources ==
- Ball, F. Elrington The Judges in Ireland 1221-1921 John Murray London 1926
- Irish Archaeological and Celtic Society Vol.2 1842
- McFarlane, K.B. England in the Fifteenth Century-Collected Essays Hambleton Press London 1981
- Page, William History of the County of Bedfordshire 1908

== Footnotes ==
Legal offices
Preceded by Richard White	Lord Chief Justice of the King's Bench for Ireland; 1365-67	Succeeded by John Keppock
