= John le Hunt =

Irish judge

John Hunt, le Hunt, Hunter or Hunter del Nash (died after 1351) was an English-born judge who served briefly as Lord Chief Justice of Ireland. He was the ancestor of the prominent Longueville family of Wolverton (which is now part of Milton Keynes).

== Career ==
He was born in Buckinghamshire, son of Nicholas le Hunt of Fenny Stratford. The Nicholas le Hunt of Fenny Stratford who, jointly with his wife Agnes, exercised the right of advowson to present a priest to the living of Walton in 1348, was probably his brother. John himself owned property in Walton, which passed to his descendants, the Longueviĺles or Longvilles. He was a member of the English House of Commons.

He accompanied the Justiciar of Ireland, Sir Raoul or Ralph d'Ufford, to Ireland in 1344 and became a justice of the Court of King's Bench (Ireland). The following year he became Lord Chief Justice of Ireland, but served for only a year, and returned to England soon afterwards. We have a record of his attendance in his judicial capacity at least one meeting of the Privy Council of Ireland in 1346. An order in the Close Rolls the same year directs payment to him of £10, in part payment of his salary, which was the then standard £40 per annum.

== Family ==
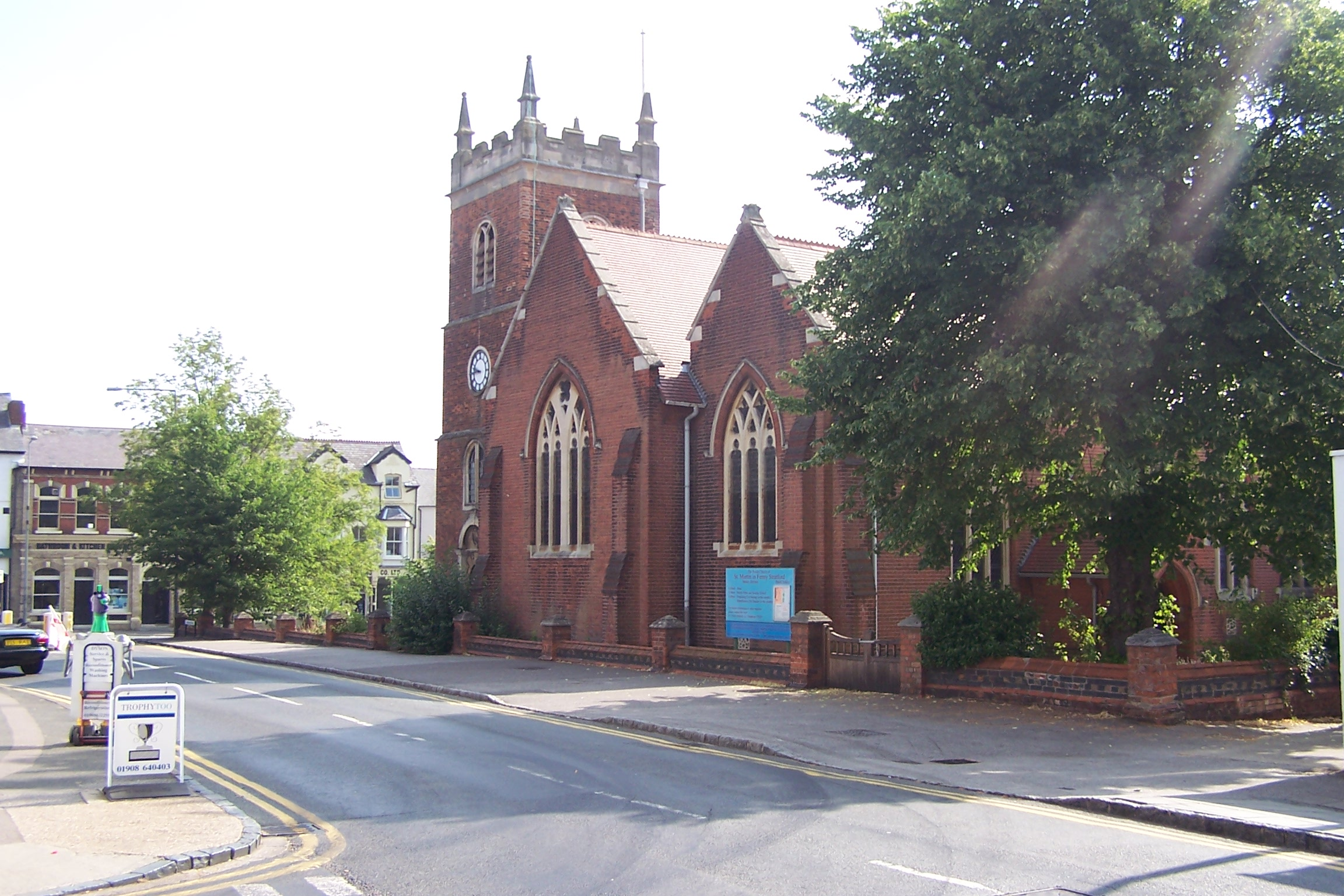
St. Martin's Church, Fenny Stratford. John le Hunt was born in the village.

He married Margaret (or Margery) de Wolverton, daughter and eventual co-heiress of Sir John de Wolverton junior of Wolverton and his second wife Joan. They had one daughter, Joan, who married John Longueville of Billing, Northamptonshire. John was probably a son or brother of Sir George de Longueville, "chevalier", who was murdered in 1357. The Crown was sufficiently concerned about the killing to set up a judicial commission of inquiry, headed by William de Notton, who was himself to be Lord Chief Justice of Ireland from 1361 to about 1365, but its outcome is unclear. John and Joan were the grandparents of George Longville (c.1386-1458), MP for Buckinghamshire.

Le Hunt was still alive in 1351 when, on the death of her brother Ralph, an infant of four, his wife Margaret and her sister Joan jointly inherited the Wolverton estates; these passed to John and Margaret's daughter Joan, and by descent, into the Longueville family (later generations used the spelling Longville), who remained at Wolverton until 1712.

After Hunt's death, his widow remarried three times: firstly to Roger de Louth, then to Richard Imworth, and finally to John Howes; but she is not known to have had any further children by her later husbands.

Legal offices
Preceded by Robert de Scardeburgh	Lord Chief Justice of the King's Bench for Ireland; 1345-46	Succeeded by Henry de Motlowe
