= Nicholas Lumbard =

Irish barrister and judge (died after 1368)

Nicholas Lumbard or Lombard (died after 1368) was an Irish barrister and judge of the fourteenth century.

== Family ==
He was a native of Waterford City. He was the son of Richard Lumbard, and probably a close relative of William Lumbard, who was four times Mayor of Waterford between 1377 and 1387. The family, as their name suggests, had come to Ireland from Lombardy, in northern Italy, in the thirteenth century. They became one of the most prominent families in Waterford, producing no less than nine Mayors of Waterford and giving their name to Lombard Street; perhaps the most notable family member was Peter Lombard (c.1555-1625), Archbishop of Armagh. One branch of the family founded Lombardstown, County Cork. Another branch moved to County Kilkenny.

== Career ==
Nicholas was Attorney-General for Ireland in 1345: he was one of the first known holders of the office. In 1356 he was appointed a Baron of the Court of Exchequer (Ireland), but the appointment was cancelled, apparently on the grounds that it was "a mistake". In 1360 he became second justice of the Court of King's Bench (Ireland), at a salary of 40 marks a year.

In 1364 Richard White, the Lord Chief Justice of Ireland, was sent by the Irish House of Commons to Westminster to present a report on "the true state of affairs in Ireland" and specifically to complain about maladministration by certain Crown officials. In White's absence Lumbard, as second justice, was acting Lord Chief Justice for 4 months. The last record of him as a judge seems to be in 1368, when he was still sitting on the King's Bench: the Council ordered him to be paid 20 marks, being a half year's arrears of his salary. In the same year he received custody of a suspected traitor and had him lodged in Dublin Castle. His date of death is not recorded.

== Descendants ==
He was married with children, including the younger Nicholas and John (living 1375). John Lumbard the younger, who was also a judge of the Court of King's Bench, as well as judge of assize for Leinster and Munster, and Deputy Constable of Ireland (died 1412) was his grandson, son of Nicholas the younger. In 1422 John de la Veer of County Kilkenny granted his manor of Ballykeff (Ballykeeffe) to John Lombard, son of Nicholas Lombard; this John was possibly a nephew of the judge.
