= Listed buildings in Monk Bretton =

Monk Bretton is a ward in the metropolitan borough of Barnsley, South Yorkshire, England. The ward contains 14 listed buildings that are recorded in the National Heritage List for England. Of these, three are listed at Grade I, the highest of the three grades, and the others are at Grade II, the lowest grade. The ward contains the village of Monk Bretton and the surrounding area. In the ward are the remains of Monk Bretton Priory, its gatehouse and an administrative block, all, listed at Grade I. The other listed buildings are houses, farmhouses and farm buildings, a former water mill, a market cross, and a church.

== Key ==
| Grade | Criteria |
|---|---|
| I | Particularly important buildings of more than special interest |
| II | Buildings of national importance and special interest |

== Buildings ==
| Name and location | Photograph | Date | Notes | Grade |
|---|---|---|---|---|
| Monk Bretton Priory remains 53.55398°N 1.43856°W | | 12th century | The priory was later extended, it is in stone, but only parts of walls remain. These mainly consist of the church to the north and a cloister to the south. Elsewhere, there are parts of the refectory and kitchens, a reredorter and drainage system, the guest house, the prior's lodging, and the infirmary. Most of the remains are only a few feet high. | I |
| Priory Mill; 53.55251°N 1.44010°W | | 13th century (possible) | The water mill was remodelled in 1635, further altered in the 19th century, and later used for other purposes. It is in stone, with a roof of Welsh slate on the right, and stone slate on the left. There are two storeys, and the front is in two parts, the right part projecting. In the left part is an entrance with a deep lintel on imposts. In both parts are continuous hood moulds, and varied openings, many of them with chamfered surrounds. At the rear are two openings for water courses, one with a round head, the other with a square head. | II |
| Administration building, Monk Bretton Priory; 53.55467°N 1.43842°W | | c. 1300 | The building, which was re-roofed in 1931, is in stone, with quoins, and two parallel gabled Welsh slate roofs. There are two storeys, a rectangular plan, and four internal bays. On each front is an entrance with a cambered head and a quoined surround, single-light chamfered windows and three-light chamfered mullioned windows and, in the upper floors, a central doorway with a cambered head and quoined surround. | I |
| Market cross 53.56635°N 1.45480°W | | Medieval | The cross has a medieval four-step octagonal base and a later shaft set in a square concrete block. An iron lamp standard has been added later. | II |
| Gatehouse, Monk Bretton Priory; 53.55470°N 1.43905°W | | 15th century | The gatehouse, which probably incorporates earlier material, is in stone and has two storeys. It consists of a north–south passageway with an almonry to the east, a porter's lodge to the west, and a square tower to the south-west. In the north front is the main round-arched entrance with a hood mould, over which is a canopied niche. The upper floor contains square-headed windows, and openings with pointed arches, and at the top is a deep parapet, partly embattled. The south front has a similar archway flanked by buttresses, and to the left is the square tower with an arched entrance. | I |
| Manor Farmhouse; 53.56700°N 1.45565°W | — | 17th century | The farmhouse is in stone, the right gable end rendered, with string courses, and a Welsh slate roof with chamfered gable copings on cut kneelers. There are three storeys and an attic, a front of four bays, and a three-bay rear wing. The doorway has a chamfered quoined surround. The windows were mullioned and transomed, but most have been replaced by modern casements. On the left return are external steps leading to an attic doorway. | II |
| Dovecote, Cricket Farm; 53.56547°N 1.45458°W | — | Mid to late 18th century | The dovecote is in stone with brick internal lining, and has a stone slate roof with gable copings on cut kneelers. There are three storeys and one bay. It contains a doorway with a deep shaped lintel, a two-light window in the middle floor, and a single-light window in the top floor. Inside there are nesting holes. To the left is a lower two-storey building with a Welsh slate roof. | II |
| Cartshed south of Manor Farmhouse; 53.56660°N 1.45585°W | — | Late 18th century | The cart shed has stone walls, a later pantile roof, and an open front of four bays. There are three square stone piers with footstones and padstones. | II |
| Farm buildings north of Manor Farmhouse; 53.56730°N 1.45571°W | — | Late 18th century | The farm building is in stone with brick lining, quoins, and a Welsh slate roof with chamfered gable copings on moulded kneelers. There are six bays, on the front is a projecting gabled entrance and slit vents, and at the rear is a cart entry with a segmental head. | II |
| Farm buildings south of Manor Farmhouse; 53.56676°N 1.45573°W | — | Late 18th century | A stable range in stone, with quoins, and a Welsh slate roof. There are two storeys and three bays. On the front are three entrances with jambs and deep lintels, and slit vents, and at the rear is a small chamfered entrance, and another entrance approached by stone steps. At a right angle to the left is a two-storey building with altered openings. | II |
| Manor House; 53.58443°N 1.44647°W | — | Late 18th century | A farmhouse in stone with quoins, stone gutter brackets, and a stone slate roof with gable copings on moulded kneelers. There are two storeys and a symmetrical front of three bays. The central doorway has an architrave, a pulvinated frieze, and a cornice, and the windows are mullioned with three lights. | II |
| Osborne House; 53.56556°N 1.44901°W | — | c. 1820 | A large stone house with a moulded eaves cornice and blocking course, and a hipped Welsh slate roof. There are two storeys, a symmetrical front of five bays, and four bays on the sides. In the centre is a Doric portico and a doorway with a fanlight. The windows are sashes. | II |
| St Paul's Church; 53.56398°N 1.45243°W | | 1876–78 | The church is in stone with a Welsh slate roof. It consists of a nave with a clerestory, north and south aisles, a south porch, a chancel with an apse, a Lady chapel, a vestry and transepts, a north apsidal baptistry, and a west steeple. The steeple has a tower with three stages, angle buttresses, a west door, a three-light west window, and a broach spire with lucarnes. | II |
| The Gables; 53.58621°N 1.44921°W | — | c. 1878 | A vicarage, later used for other purposes, it is in stone and has a tile roof with ridge cresting. There are two storeys, three gabled bays at the front, and a lower intermediate projecting gable. In the second bay is a doorway with a pointed head, and the windows have single lights, or are mullioned, or mullioned and transomed. The three main gables have decorative tile-hanging in the apexes. | II |
