= Richard White (Irish judge) =

Irish judge

Richard White (died 1367) was an Irish judge who held office as Lord Chief Justice of Ireland; he is remembered mainly for his complaints to the English Crown about the corruption and inefficiency of his judicial colleagues.

== Early life ==
He was born at Clongill, near Navan in County Meath; the White family owned Clongill Castle until the seventeenth century. He was not, as far as is known, related to Richard (or Robert) White, who was appointed Prior of the Order of Knights Hospitaller at Kilmainham in 1384. Like all Irish barristers of the time he studied law in England and was living there in 1352, when he was given a licence to import corn into Ireland.

He returned to Ireland in 1354. In 1359 he was appointed King's Serjeant in Ireland; as was the common practice at the time, the appointment was for a limited period and covered a part of Ireland only. He became Lord Chief Justice in November 1363.

== Mission to England ==
At this time several senior Irish officials, most notably Thomas de Burley, the Lord Chancellor of Ireland, were the subject of serious charges of corruption and maladministration. In 1364 White was a member of a delegation of nobles and officials, headed by Maurice FitzGerald, 4th Earl of Kildare and Simon Fleming, 1st Baron Slane, which was sent by the Irish House of Commons to England to report on the state of Irish government, to complain of the corruption of several officials, and to ask for Burley's removal. White was in England from April to July 1364; Nicholas Lumbard acted as Lord Chief Justice in his place.

The delegation had some success, at least in the short term: Burley was removed as Lord Chancellor (though he was later reinstated) and White himself was appointed to a new commission to inquire into the state of the Irish administration, whose other members included the Earl of Kildare, and John Hussey, Baron Galtrim. White seems to have enjoyed the personal favour of King Edward III, who gave him a licence to acquire land to the value of £20, although as a rule it was strictly forbidden for Irish officials to buy property. Significantly, the King ordered that White and his colleagues should not be "troubled" at home for their mission to England, which suggests that they were afraid of reprisals from Burley and his allies.

== Last years and descendants ==
In 1365 he was entrusted with the task of keeping the peace in Munster. He died in 1367. The Richard Whyte who was living at Clogell (Clongill) in 1541 was probably his descendant, as was Patrick White, listed as one of "the gentlemen of East Meath" in 1598. Christopher White, who married Jane Netterville early in the following century, was probably Patrick's son.

Legal offices
Preceded by William de Notton	Lord Chief Justice of the King's Bench for Ireland; 1363-65	Succeeded by Thomas de la Dale
