= William le Petit =

Irish judge

William le Petit, Petyt, or Lepetit (died after 1360) was an Irish judge who was very briefly Lord Chief Justice of Ireland. He is chiefly notable for having been pardoned for homicide.

It is unclear if he had any connection to the Petit family, who had the title Baron Dunboyne. Sir William le Petit, of County Meath, who came to Ireland with Hugh de Lacy, was Justiciar of Ireland in 1191.

He is referred to as the Irish King's Serjeant in 1338 and as Attorney General for Ireland in 1343, although the two offices are easily confused in this era, due to the lack of precision about their respective roles.

In 1343, and again in 1344, he and his fellow Serjeant-at-law Hugh Brown (who was in office from 1331 to about 1346) received substantial fees for their "good and laudable services" in going with the Lord Deputy of Ireland to several Irish counties to "promulgate and expedite several affairs nearly concerning the King", in addition to the expenses they had incurred. In 1348 he and the Serjeant-at-law, Edmund of Barford, attended the session of Parliament held at Kilkenny, and were paid their expenses for attending.

He was a justice of the Court of King's Bench (Ireland) by 1347, and in 1359 briefly replaced John de Rednesse as Lord Chief Justice. Shortly afterwards he was appointed Deputy to the Justiciar of Ireland. The records refer to the inability of a single judge to cope with the volume of judicial business. Accordingly William, whose legal ability and loyalty were vouched for by his colleagues (including, it seems, John de Rednesse), was to have full authority to act as a judge in all the Royal Courts.

He had two powerful patrons in James Butler, 2nd Earl of Ormond, and his wife Elizabeth Darcy, who employed le Petit as her attorney. It was at their request that le Petit in 1351 received a royal pardon for killing Robert de Lynham; little is known of the circumstances of the crime.

Legal offices
Preceded by John de Rednesse	Lord Chief Justice of the King's Bench for Ireland; 1359	Succeeded by John de Rednesse
