= John Frowyk =

English cleric and judge

John Frowyk (died after 1359) was an English-born cleric and judge in fourteenth-century Ireland.

He became Prior of the Irish Chapter of the Order of Knights Hospitaller, whose house was at Kilmainham, in 1356 and in the same year was appointed Lord Chancellor of Ireland; apart from a brief interval when he was replaced by Thomas de Burley, he served in both offices until at least 1359.

O'Flanagan writing in 1870 states that no further details of his life are recorded. D'Alton, however, states that as Prior he obtained royal confirmation of the privileges of the Order of Hospitallers. It is also known that he played a major role in the Parliament held at Kilkenny in January 1359, which was concerned largely with the threat to the Anglo-Irish from an apparently concerted series of attacks by neighbouring Irish clans.

Several records of his tenure as Lord Chancellor survive: letters patent were issued by Edward III addressed to Frowyk and other Crown officials in December 1357, giving details of an inquiry into alleged misconduct by John de Boulton, the former Justiciar of Ireland, who held office briefly in 1357. In June 1359 the Patent Rolls record that Frowyk, who was still Lord Chancellor, was going to England to speak to the King and Privy Council about "urgent and important business concerning the land of Ireland, as agreed by the Justiciar of Ireland and the "prelates, magnates and peers" at the recent meeting of the Parliament of Ireland at Kilkenny". A further entry in the Rolls explains that Parliament had decided to send Frowyk to England to make manifest to the King and Council the dangers which threatened his subjects in Ireland. He was awarded 100 marks to cover the expenses of the journey. The "dangers and urgent matters" referred to were the increasingly frequent attacks on the English of Leinster by the local Irish clans. Parliament felt sufficiently threatened to issue a declaration of war against the clans, and to raise a subsidy to cover the cost of the fighting.

In 1358, he sat on a commission of oyer and terminer with John de Rednesse, the Lord Chief Justice of Ireland , Sir Thomas de Rokeby the younger and others to inquire into the actions of those of the King's subjects who had sold weapons and victuals to his enemies, and treacherously adhered to those enemies.

Archdall describes a somewhat embarrassing lawsuit brought against Frowyk by Walter Say, a merchant, alleging the detinue (unlawful retention) by Frowyk of valuable bales of cloth and spices, which his servant had deposited in Kilmainham Priory for safe-keeping, but which Frowyk in his capacity as Ptoor refused to release. -Judgment was given for Say, who was awarded £100, a considerable sum at the time.

In 1358, the King granted Frowyk custody of the castle and manor of Clare, County Tipperary, formerly owned by James Bermingham, son of Edmund Bermingham, to hold until the Bermingham heir came of age. The ruins of Clare Castle, situated on the River Anner, still stand.

== Frowyk family of Middlesex ==
John is said to have been the son of Lawrence Frowyk of London. It is possible that he belonged to the Frowyk family of Old Fold, Middlesex, who were prominent in the London merchant community and in local politics for two centuries. Roger de Frowyk, who built a mansion at Seething Lane, close to the Tower of London, around 1303, was a goldsmith and an English Crown official. Thomas Frowyk (died 1508) was Chief Justice of the Common Pleas. He was the grandson of Henry Frowyk, who was twice Lord Mayor of London.
