= Notton =

Village and civil parish in West Yorkshire, England

Coordinates: 53.613°N 1.474°W

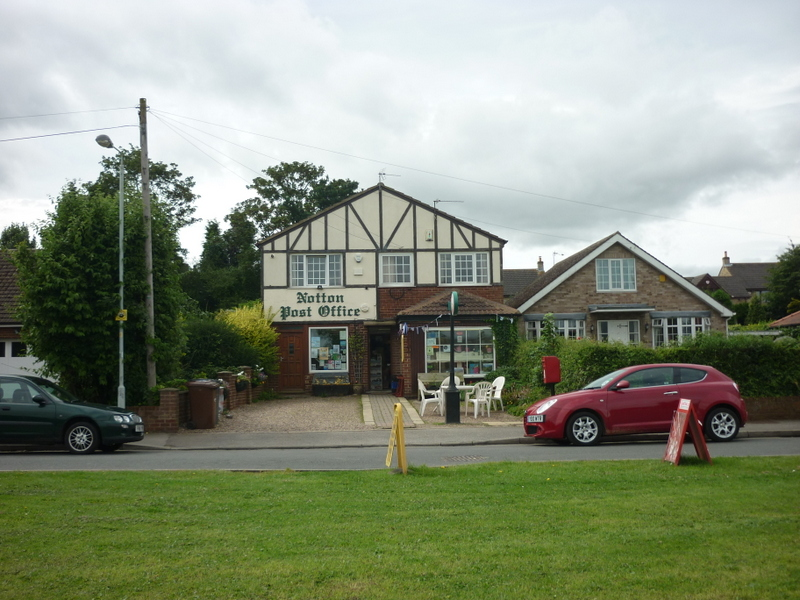
- Notton Post Office, 2012

- Location within West Yorkshire
- Population: 982 (2011)
- OS grid reference: SE349131
- Civil parish: Notton
- Metropolitan borough: City of Wakefield
- Metropolitan county: West Yorkshire
- Region: Yorkshire and the Humber
- Country: England
- Sovereign state: United Kingdom
- Post town: WAKEFIELD
- Postcode district: WF4
- Dialling code: 01226 (Barnsley)
- Police: West Yorkshire
- Fire: West Yorkshire
- Ambulance: Yorkshire
- UK Parliament: Hemsworth

Notton is a village and civil parish in the City of Wakefield district of West Yorkshire, England. The village is approximately 1 mile (1.6 km) north-west of Royston, 5.5 miles (9 km) from Barnsley town centre and 6.5 miles (10 km) south of Wakefield. The parish had a population of 982 at the 2011 Census.

The name Notton derives from the Old English hnoctūn meaning 'wether (castrated male sheep) settlement'.

In the Middle Ages the manor was held by the de Notton family, whose most notable member was William de Notton (died about 1365), who was Lord Chief Justice of Ireland. It later passed to the Darcy family.

Notton was in the West Riding of Yorkshire in the Staincross Wapentake and part of the ancient parish of Royston. Until 1974, the parish was part of Wakefield Rural District, before then Notton was part of the Barnsley Rural District before its abolition in 1938.

Notton has a village hall on George Lane, and a post office on Applehaigh Lane.

== See also ==
- Listed buildings in Notton
