= Monk Bretton =

Village in South Yorkshire, England

Coordinates: 53.5784°N 1.4149°W

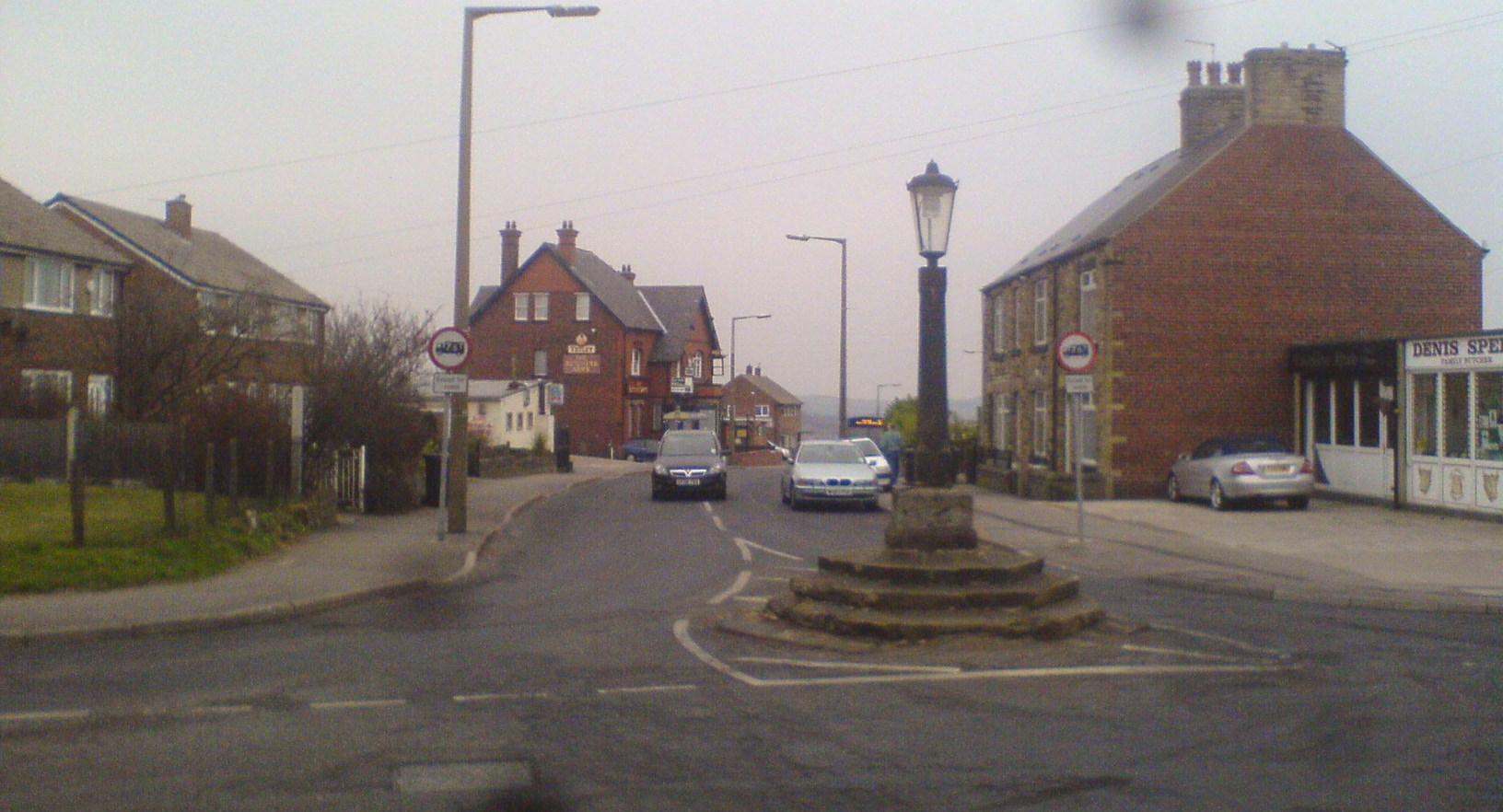
- View of Monk Bretton High Street, featuring the ancient Butter Cross

- Location within South Yorkshire
- OS grid reference: SK5198
- Metropolitan borough: Barnsley
- Metropolitan county: South Yorkshire
- Region: Yorkshire and the Humber
- Country: England
- Sovereign state: United Kingdom
- Post town: BARNSLEY
- Postcode district: S71
- Dialling code: 01226
- Police: South Yorkshire
- Fire: South Yorkshire
- Ambulance: Yorkshire
- UK Parliament: Barnsley North

Monk Bretton is a village in the Metropolitan Borough of Barnsley in South Yorkshire, England. It lies approximately two miles north-east from Barnsley town centre. Until 1974 it was in the West Riding of Yorkshire.

== History ==
Historically, Monk Bretton is part of the West Riding of Yorkshire in the ancient Wapentake of Staincross.

Monk Bretton has been a settlement since medieval times and was originally known as just 'Bretton'. It is sometimes thought to have taken its name from the twelfth-century Adam fitz Swain de Bretton, whose family owned much land in the area and who also founded Monk Bretton Priory. However, in the Domesday Book of 1086 the area is already known as Brettone, and the name may have originally meant 'Farmstead of the Britons', suggesting that a remnant of the old Romano-British population may have lived here into the Anglo-Saxon period. According to Domesday Book, the local Saxon lord in 1066 had been an individual called Wulfmer, who by 1086 had been replaced by a Norman lord, Illbert de Lacey, a major landholder associated with many other locations in the county. By 1225 the village was referred to as Munkebretton, ‘munke’ referring to the monks of the nearby Priory.

In 1444, Sir William de Bretton gave to Thomas Haryngton, esquire, and other trustees, lands and tenements in Monk Bretton, which his father and grandfather had leased to the prior and convent for a term of years.

The mediaeval village cross, today known as the ‘Butter Cross’, still survives, standing at the junction of High Street and Cross Street. This precious monument had the go ahead for a traffic island to protect it in 2011. The scheme, costing £106,000 also saw the road junction widened for buses and other large vehicles to pass on the correct side of the road rather than the opposite as in previous years. The cross may have had a social as well as a religious function, a place to meet and hear news. The village park also shows traces of mediaeval ridge and furrow cultivation.

The Manor of Wakefield Act 1609 (7 Jas. 1. c. 1) gave all freeholders of Monk Bretton manorial rights and, since it was not repealed, technically everyone who owns freehold property or land is a 'lord' of the manor.

On Burton Bank is a Quaker burial ground dating from the 1650s. The land was donated by a local benefactor, George Ellis, and the first recorded burial on the site took place in 1657. Later a small meeting house was erected, which became a focus for local Quakers up until the 19th century. An almshouse was founded in 1654 by a Dame Mary Talbot and was still in existence 180 years later.

Although the nearby Priory formed a Christian community (until dissolution by Henry VIII), Monk Bretton did not possess a church until 1838. The village formed part of the extensive parish of Royston. In 1838 the foundation stone for the first church was laid on a site donated by Sir George Wombwell, at the corner of Cross Street and Burton Road. A new chapelry district, separating Monk Bretton (with Cudworth) from Royston parish and enabling 'baptisms, churchings and burials', was created by Queen Victoria by an order in Council on 22 July 1843. The first church was replaced (on the same site) by the present St Paul's Church in 1878. The church, built in the late Decorated style, is now a grade II listed building. The churchyard contains 16 burials from the 1866 Oaks Colliery explosion.

In 1801, Monk Bretton had a population of 480. By the 1870s, this had grown to just over 1900, according to John Marius Wilson's Imperial Gazetteer of England and Wales 1870–72. Wilson also stated that besides its church, Monk Bretton had three Methodist chapels, as well as a national school and six alms-houses.

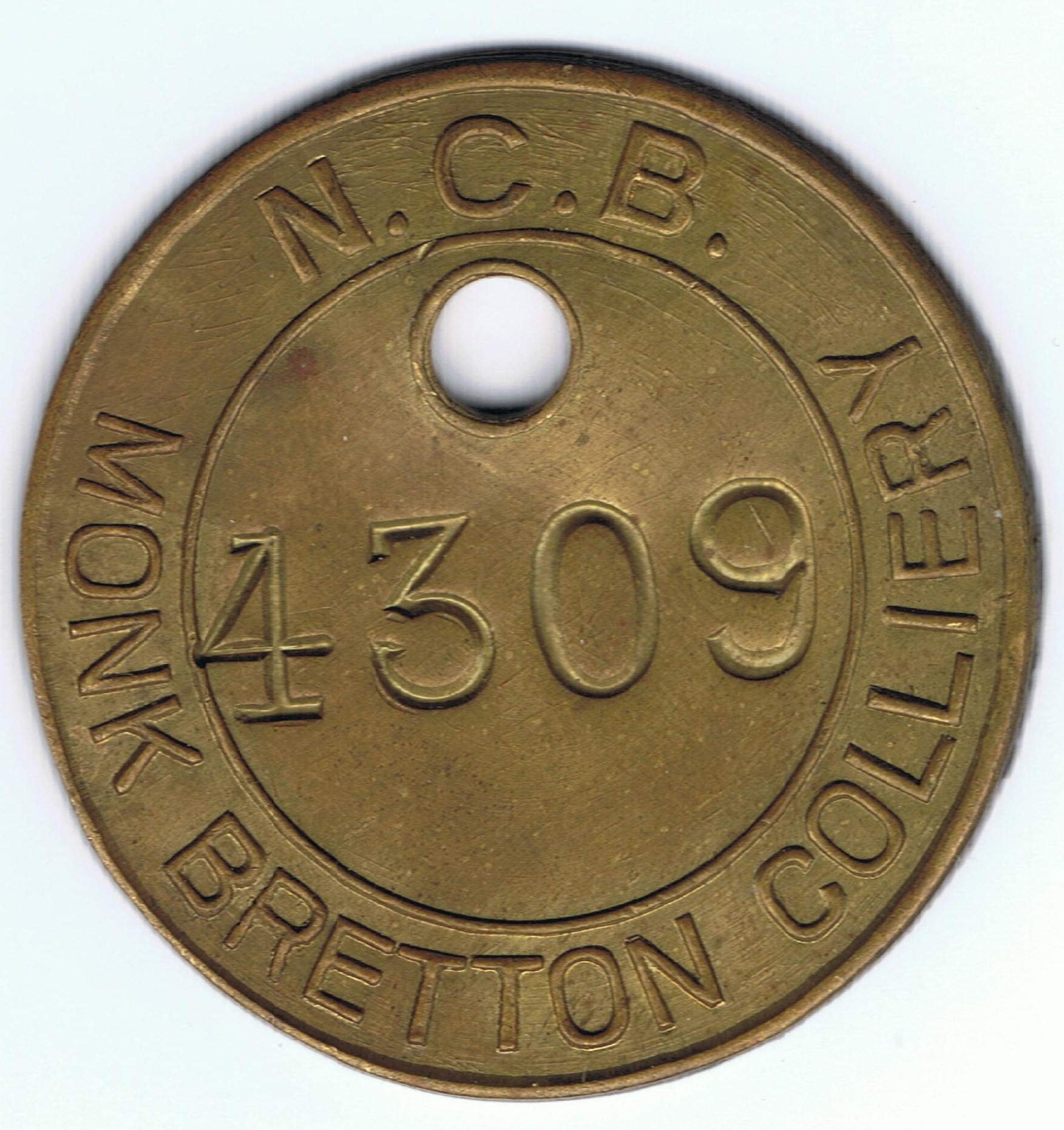
NCB Monk Bretton Colliery Tag

Monk Bretton Colliery opened in 1870, extracting coal from the Barnsley Seam. The colliery was modernised on nationalisation and pit head baths, which still stand today, were opened. A village Miners' Welfare Hall was opened in Cross Street. The colliery was closed in 1968.

In February 1888 Monk Bretton was the location of a notorious murder, when the local doctor, William Burke, shot dead his own nine-year-old daughter Aileen Burke in the Norman Inn before attempting suicide with the same weapon. Despite shooting himself in the chest, Burke survived and was convicted of murder. He was sentenced to death but the sentence was later commuted. However, Burke subsequently died in prison in May 1889.

Monk Bretton once possessed some of the most historic buildings in the Barnsley area, but these were never preserved. The Manor House and several other interesting structures on Cross Street and High Street disappeared in the 1960s. Also demolished was Monk Bretton 'Castle', a folly on Burton Bank built by a local priest as a look-out tower or observatory and subsequently used for the lighting of beacons on occasions such as royal events and the end of wars. Only Manor Farm remains, and the oldest structure still standing is a 17th-century barn at the junction of Cross Street and Westgate, belonging to the farm. The village greatly expanded in the 19th and 20th centuries with the building of new housing estates, so that today Monk Bretton more or less merges into nearby Lundwood, Carlton, Athersley and Smithies.

Monk Bretton was formerly a township and chapelry in the parish of Roystone, in 1866 Monk Bretton became a separate civil parish, on 1 April 1921 the parish was abolished and merged with Barnsley. In 1921 the parish had a population of 5135. From 1894 to 1921 Monk Bretton was an urban district that contained the parish. It is now in the unparished area of Barnsley.

== Transport and amenities ==
The village is served by several pubs, shops, a post office, library and various other local amenities, and is a 10-minute car journey from Barnsley town centre. A Stagecoach bus service connects the village with Barnsley Interchange. The village was served by Monk Bretton railway station on the Midland Main Line until the stop closed in 1937; a short fragment of the mainline remains in place serving a nearby glass works.

== Sites of interest ==
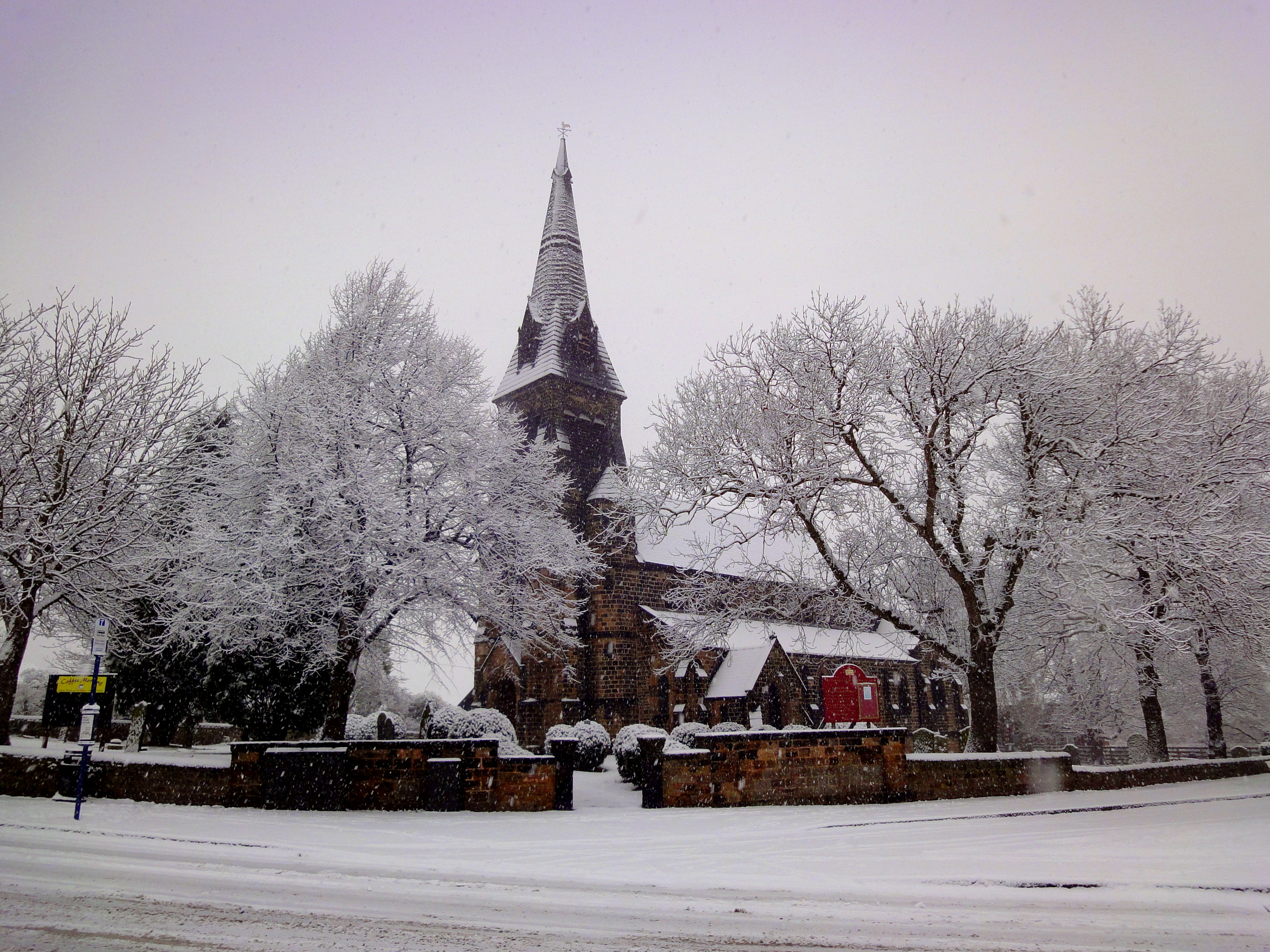
St Paul's Church

There is a disused former Quaker burial ground, a site described by Barnsley historian Brian Elliott as being 'of regional and national importance, as one of the earliest Quaker burial grounds in the country'. There is also a modern cemetery, which contains the grave of former Barnsley, Manchester United and England striker Tommy Taylor, who was killed in the Munich air disaster on 6 February 1958. He was born in Barnsley on 29 January 1932 and lived in the town until he joined Manchester United in 1953.

The nearby Priory of St Mary Magdalene of Lund, a ruined former Cluniac (later Benedictine) house, is commonly known as Monk Bretton Priory although it actually lies outside the modern village in what is today called Lundwood and close to the old hamlet of Littleworth. The Priory, Littleworth and the village were all constituent parts of the manor of Monk Bretton.

The Ardagh Glass plant, previously Redfearns Glass, lies at the edge of the village and was formerly the largest glassworks in Europe. It keeps alive Barnsley's glassmaking tradition, represented by a glassblower on the Barnsley coat of arms.

A war memorial stands on Cross Street, consisting of a paved area and two large pillars bearing the names of Monk Bretton's war dead from the Great War.

Monk Bretton has an 8.7 acre park featuring a wildlife pond. The site shows undulations indicative of ridge and furrow cultivation. The Monk Bretton Miners' Welfare Committee was granted £4,760 in 1925 for the purpose of purchasing the former farmland for recreational use. In 1927 it was conveyed to the County Borough of Barnsley to be held in trust. The inscription MINERS' WELFARE SCHEME 1925 can still be seen on the old gateposts at the eastern end of the park. To the north of the park lies Winn's Wood.

The ‘Butter Cross’ or ‘Market Cross’ at the junction of Cross Street and High Street is mediaeval in origin and was converted into a lamp post in the early 1800s.

The Working Men's Club on Cross Street was founded in 1888. It is said to be the oldest Working Men's Club left in the county still to be in its original building. Two of Monk Bretton's pubs, the Pheasant Inn on High Street and the Sun Inn on Burton Road, are marked on Ordnance Survey maps from 1855.

== Notable residents ==
George Wood, an early member of a prominent local gentry family, was born in Monk Bretton in 1534 and died there in 1589. He was the ancestor of the 19th century Liberal politician Charles Wood, who took the title 1st Viscount Halifax of Monk Bretton for his 1866 peerage. Famous people from Monk Bretton include Yorkshire, Essex and England cricketer Darren Gough. Keith Laybourn, long serving Professor of History at Huddersfield University, was born in Monk Bretton. Julian Booker, Professor of Mechanical Design Engineering at the University of Bristol was born in Monk Bretton. As a youth, the renowned cricket umpire Dickie Bird is said to have worked at the colliery.

== Images ==
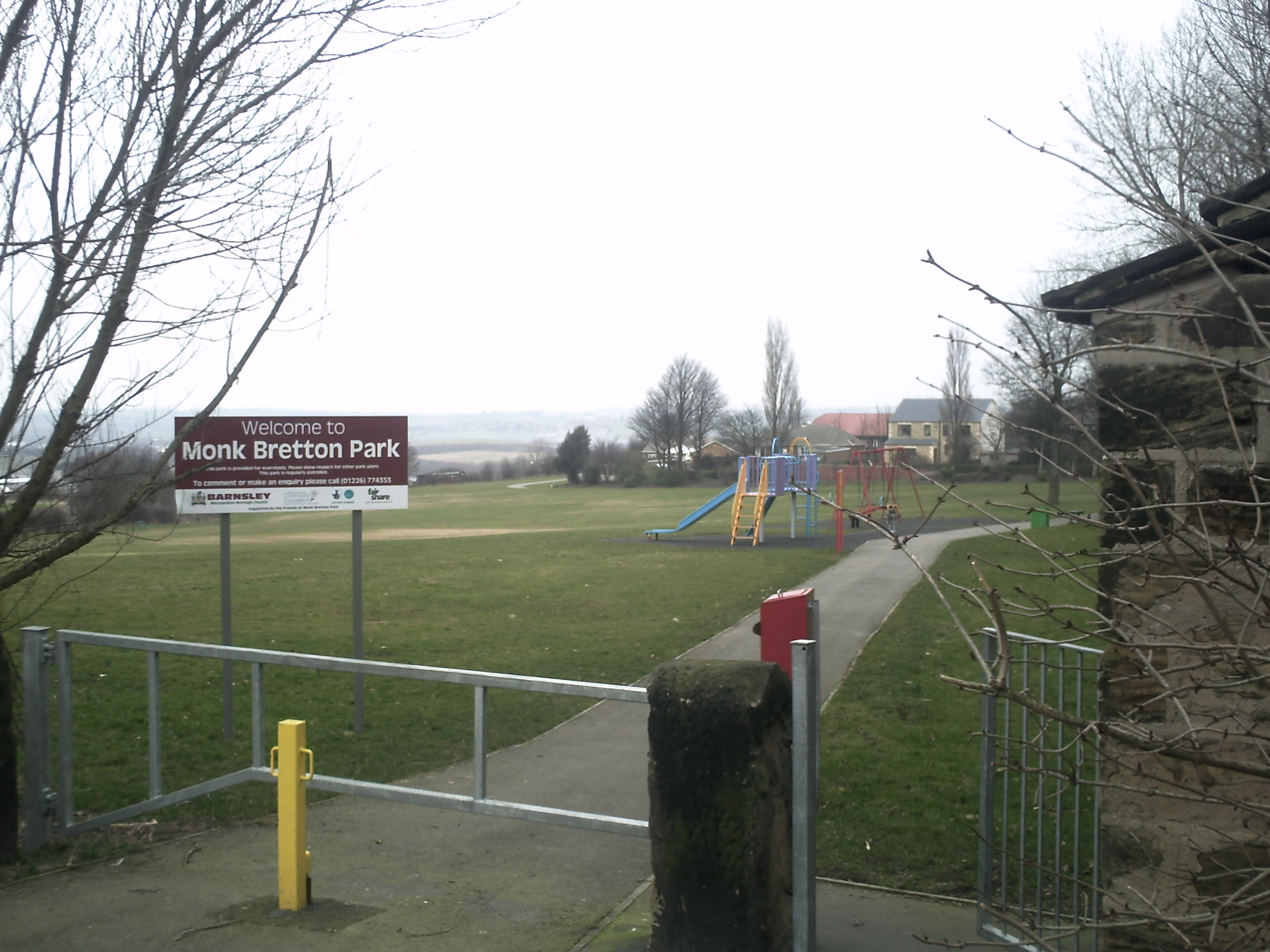
View of Monk Bretton public park

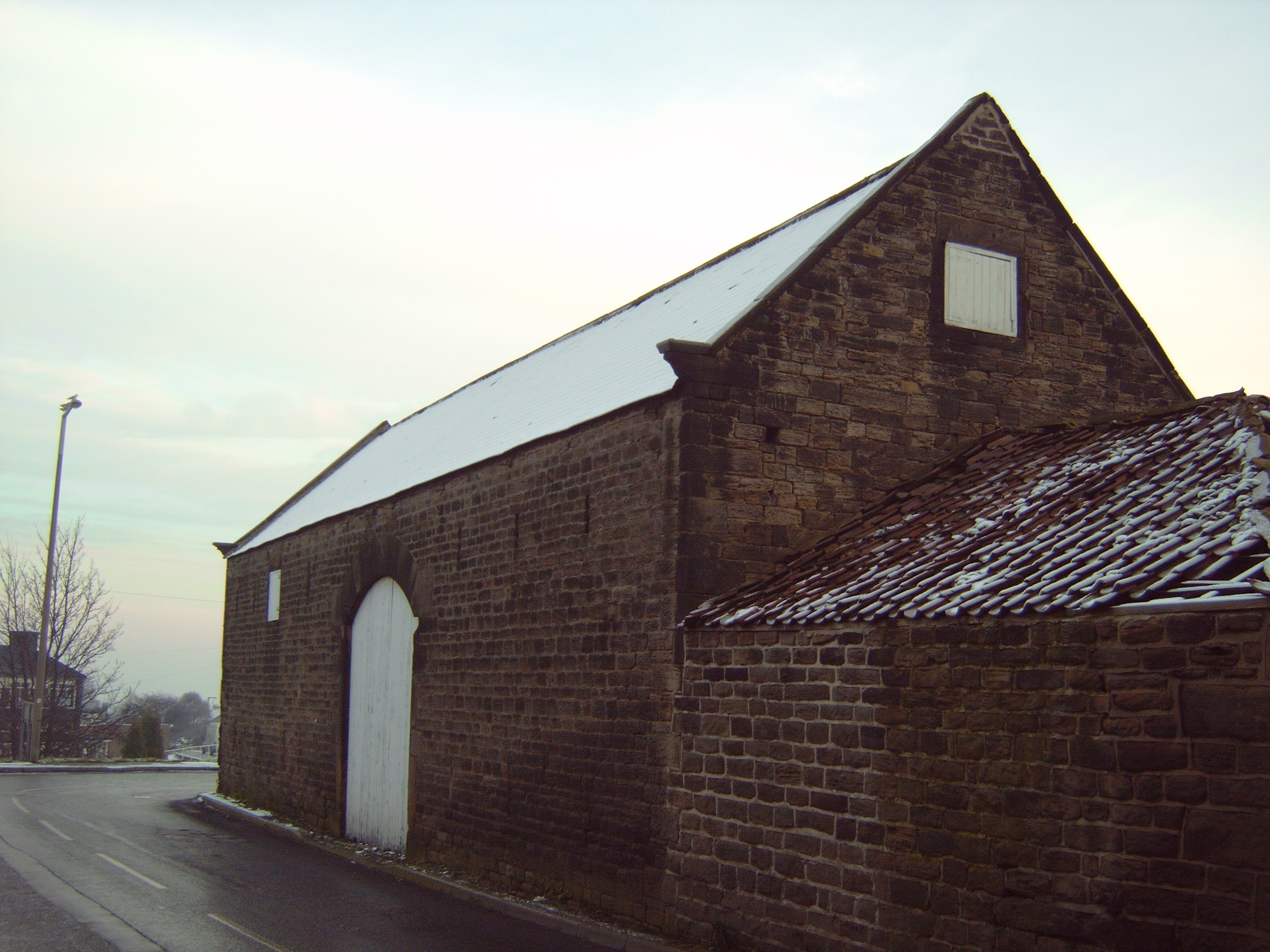
17th century barn belonging to Manor Farm, Monk Bretton

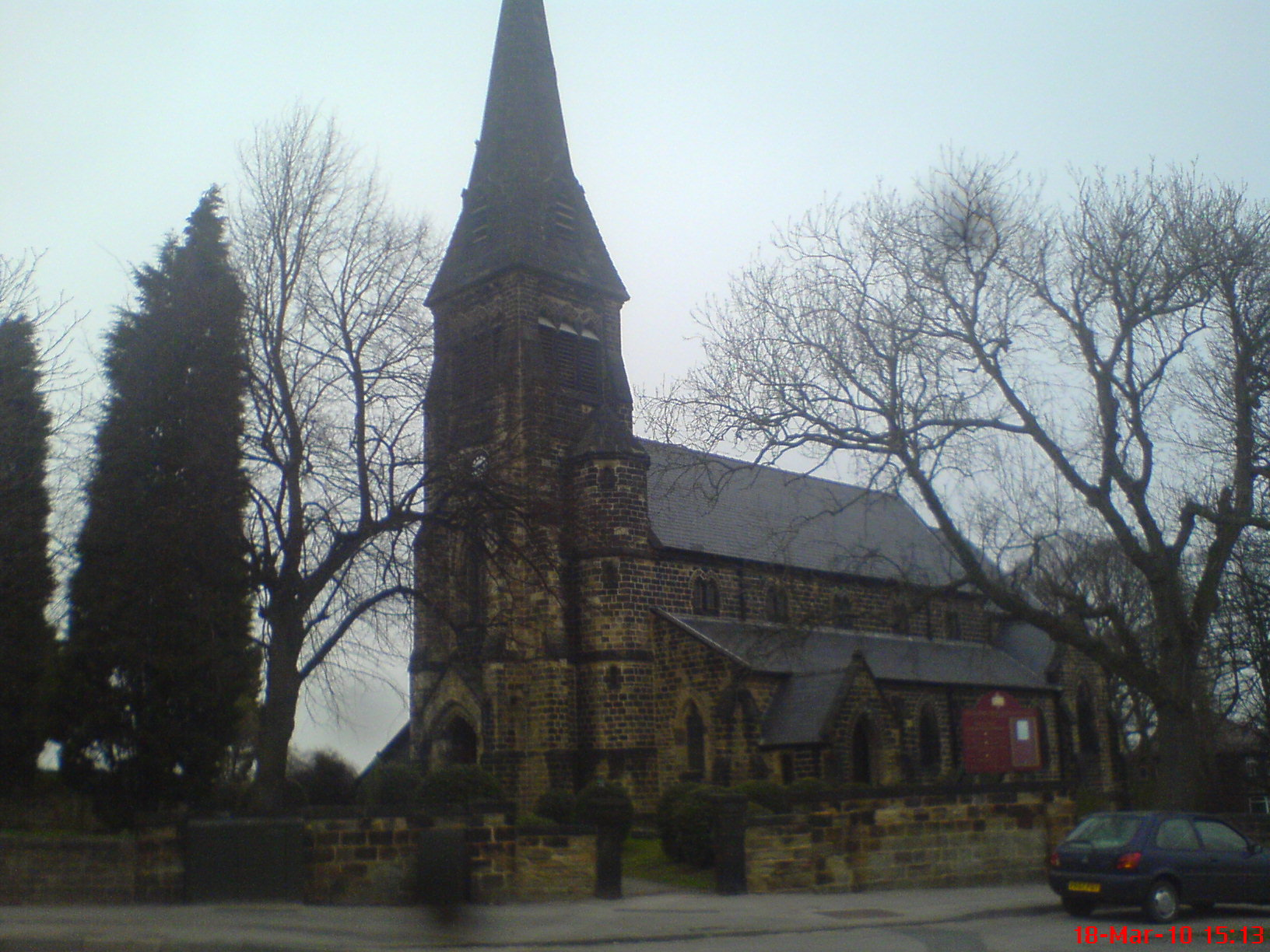
St Paul's Church, Monk Bretton

== See also ==
- Listed buildings in Monk Bretton
- John Dodson, 1st Baron Monk Bretton (He took the title for his 1884 peerage from Monk Bretton; having inherited lands there from his mother's family of Pearson).
