= Woolley, West Yorkshire =

Village in West Yorkshire, England

Coordinates: 53.614283°N 1.516274°W

Woolley
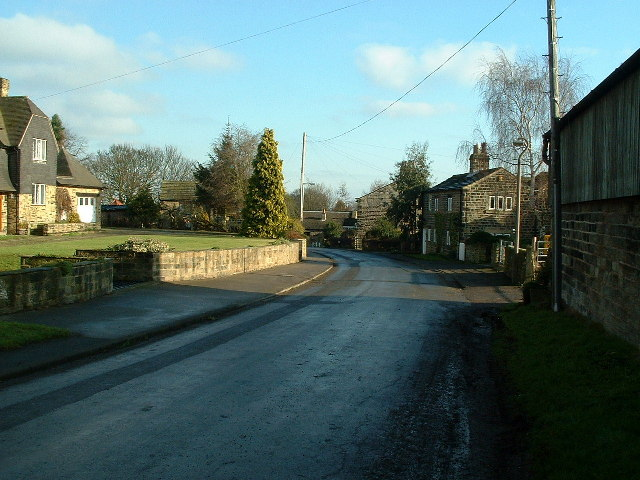
- High Street

- Location within West Yorkshire
- Population: 1,339 (2011 census)
- OS grid reference: SE321131
  - London: 155 mi (249 km) SSE
- Metropolitan borough: City of Wakefield
- Metropolitan county: West Yorkshire
- Region: Yorkshire and the Humber
- Country: England
- Sovereign state: United Kingdom
- Post town: WAKEFIELD
- Postcode district: WF4
- Dialling code: 01226
- Police: West Yorkshire
- Fire: West Yorkshire
- Ambulance: Yorkshire
- UK Parliament: Ossett and Denby Dale

Woolley is a village and civil parish that straddles the border of West Yorkshire and South Yorkshire, in Northern England. It had a population of 575 in 2001, which increased to 1,339 at the 2011 Census. It is 6 miles (10 km) north of Barnsley, and 7 miles (11 km) south of Wakefield.

== History ==
The name Woolley derives from the Old English wulflēah meaning 'wolf wood/clearing'.

Woolley was recorded as "Weludai" in the Domesday Book. The village was historically in the Staincross Wapentake part of the West Riding of Yorkshire.` In the late 19th century it was part of the Royston parish. By 1881 it had become a civil parish in its own right, which covered an area of about 2,600 acres (1,052 ha). Until 1974 it formed part of the rural district of Wakefield, Woolley had been part of the Barnsley Rural District before its abolition in 1938.

== Geography ==
No major roads pass through the village. The A61 runs about 1 mile (1.6 km) to the east, the M1 motorway about 2 miles (3.2 km) west. West of the village is the escarpment known as Woolley Edge, which has given its name to the nearby Woolley Edge service station on the M1 motorway.

Two miles (3 km) to the south west is Woolley Colliery village and the site of the former colliery is occupied by Woolley Grange, a residential development. The River Dearne is the boundary between West and South Yorkshire south of the village.

== See also ==
- Listed buildings in Woolley, West Yorkshire
- Woolley Hall
