= John Paveley =

Arms of Paveley: Azure, a cross patoncée or. John Paveley bore in addition an augmentation of a chief of the Order of Saint John of Jerusalem, namely Gules, a cross argent, as was usual for all Grand Priors

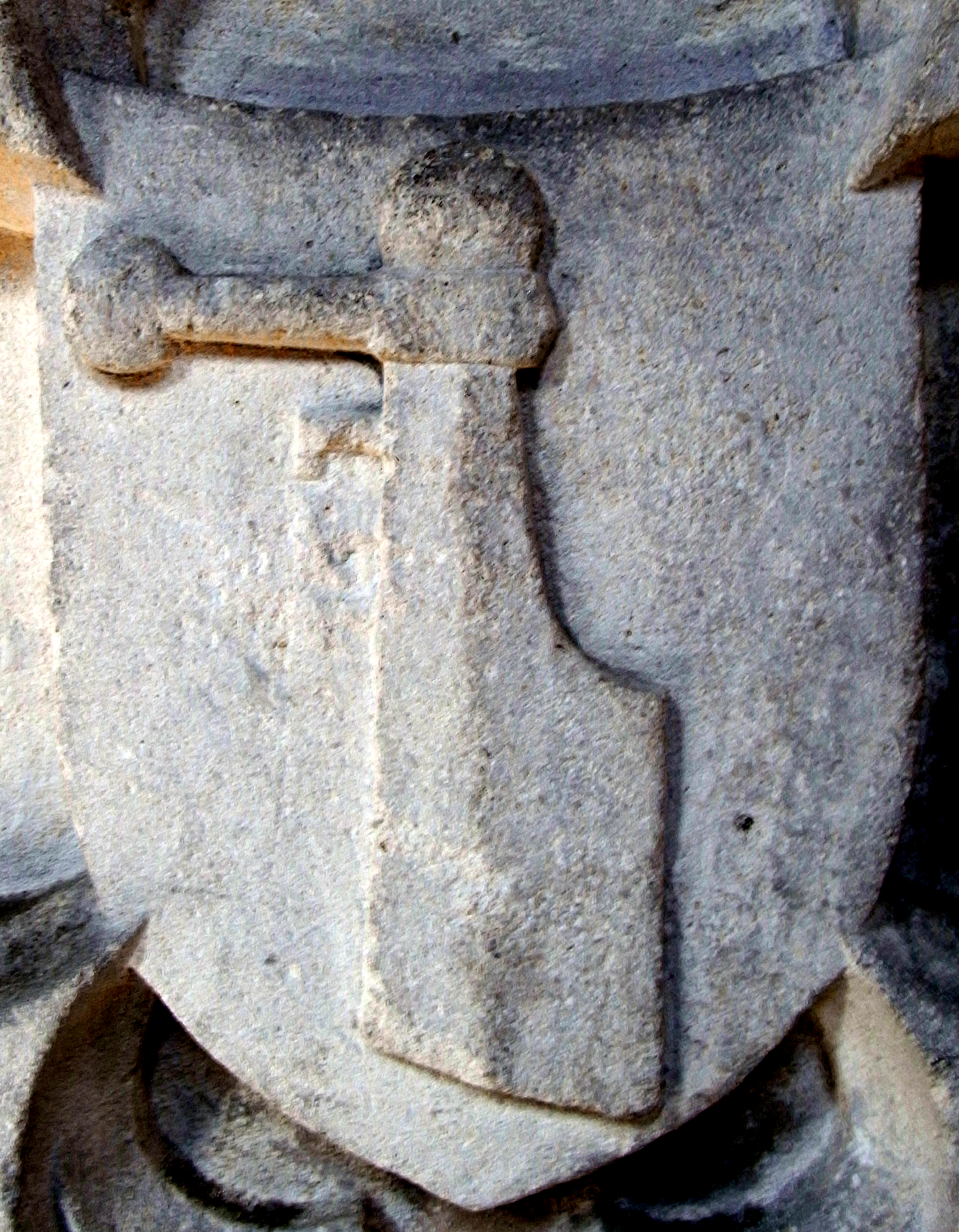
The Paveley Rudder, sculpted on the monument in Edington Priory Church to Sir Ralph Cheney (d.1401) of Broke

John Paveley (died 1371) was Grand Prior of the Order of Knights of the Hospital of Saint John of Jerusalem from 1358 until his death in 1371. In 1360 he served as Admiral of the Fleet against the French towards the end of the first phase of the Hundred Years' War.

== Career ==
He served as Lieutenant Prior and Turcopolier and was named Grand Prior of England in a bull of Roger de Pins, Grand Master, dated Rhodes, 14 October 1358. As Turcopolier he was in charge of the coastal defences of Rhodes and Malta, naval experience which clearly suited him to be selected later as Admiral of the Fleet of England.

About the time of his appointment as Prior, he was involved in a major controversy when he allegedly assaulted Simon Warde, a servant of John Gynwell, Bishop of Lincoln, who had attempted to serve a summons on him to appear in a lawsuit. King Edward III took the matter seriously enough to appoint a royal commission to investigate the allegations, but nothing seems to have come of it.

== Admiral of the Fleet ==
Sir Nicholas Harris Nicolas (1847) wrote as follows concerning Paveley's appointment as Admiral of the Fleet:

On Sunday the 15th of March 1360 the French appeared off Winchelsea, and landing a large body of horse and foot soldiers, attacked the place while the people were at mass, slew many of the inhabitants, sparing neither age, nor sex, nor rank. They set fire to the town, ravaged the neighbourhood, and committed the most horrible atrocities. At length the troops and people in the vicinity assembled; and, advancing upon the enemy, drove them after a gallant fight to their ships, with a loss in killed and drowned of more than four hundred men. Nine, if not more, beautiful women, however, were carried off, whose dreadful fate is feelingly deplored by their contemporaries. The sailors of the Cinque Ports, however, took thirteen French ships, laden with wine and other provisions. These proceedings excited terror, if not dismay, throughout the realm. Roused to a sense of their duty, the King's council, on the 15th of March, the instant after news of the event had reached them, commanded a fleet to be prepared; and every large ship and barge in all the ports fit for war was ordered to be impressed. The ships were to be manned with forty sailors, forty armed men, and sixty archers, victualled and fitted for sea without delay, and sent to cruise to the westward of the Thames. The shipping belonging to England in Flanders was sent for; and everything was done to equip a powerful armament. On the 26th of March Sir John Paveley, Prior of the Hospital of St. John in England, was appointed captain and leader of this fleet. Troops were levied in all the midland counties, and sent to London; the castles of Old Sarum and Malmesbury, as well as Southampton and other places, and especially the Queen's castle of Pevensey, were put in a state of defence; and it is difficult to convey an adequate idea of the terror of invasion which seems to have prevailed throughout the country. In this emergency, eighty ships, with fourteen thousand soldiers and archers, were sent from London to revenge the attack on Winchelsea; and they are said to have taken the Isle of Saints; but another writer states that this fleet, which consisted of one hundred and sixty ships, proceeded under its admiral towards Boulogne, and thence to Harfleur, and did great injury to France. The war was, however, terminated by the Treaty of Brétigny, on the 8th of May 1360.

== Arms and Paveley Rudder ==
Arms of John Paveley: Azure, a cross patoncée or, as depicted in St John's Gate, Clerkenwell. These were also the arms used by the Paveley family of Broke in Wiltshire, whose heir was the Cheney family and subsequently Robert Willoughby, 1st Baron Willoughby de Broke (d.1502), who quartered the Paveley arms. The Paveley Rudder was a heraldic badge used by the Paveley family, later adopted by the Cheneys (it survives in its earliest manifestation sculpted on the monument in Edington Priory Church to Sir Ralph Cheney (d.1401) of Broke,) and by the 1st Baron.
