= Barnewall =

Barnewall is a surname. Notable people with the surname include:

- Anthony Barnewall (1721–1739), German army officer
- John Barnewall (disambiguation)
- Nicholas Barnewall (disambiguation)
- Patrick Barnewall (disambiguation)

== See also ==
- Viscount Barnewall
- Barnewall baronets
