= John Barnewall =

John Barnewall may refer to:

- John Barnewall, 3rd Baron Trimlestown (died 1538), Irish nobleman, judge and politician
- John Barnewall (Franciscan friar) (c. 1595–c. 1650), Irish Franciscan friar and scholar
- Sir John Robert Barnewall, 11th Baronet (1850–1936), of the Barnewall baronets
- John Barnewall (recorder) (c. 1635–c. 1705), Irish landowner, barrister, judge and Recorder of Dublin
- John Thomas Barnewall, 15th Baron Trimlestown (1773–1839), Irish landowner
