= Frances Talbot, Countess of Tyrconnell =

Restoration-court beauty (died 1731)

Frances Talbot
- Countess of Tyrconnell
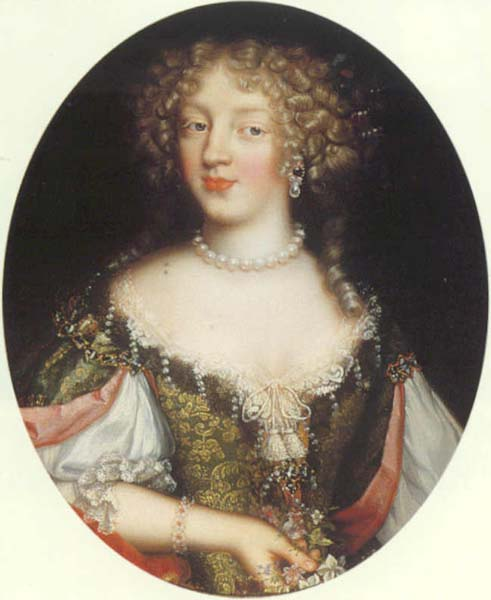
- Detail from the portrait below
- Born: c. 1649; Sandridge, Hertfordshire, England
- Died: 6 March 1731; Dublin
- Spouses: 1. Sir George Hamilton (m. 1665; died 1676); 2. Richard, 1st Earl of Tyrconnell (m. 1681; died 1691)
- Issue Detail: Elizabeth, Frances, Mary, & others
- Father: Richard Jennings
- Mother: Frances Thornhurst

Frances Talbot, Countess of Tyrconnell (née Jennings, previously Hamilton; c. 1649 – 1731), also called La Belle Jennings, was a maid of honour to the Duchess of York and, like her sister Sarah, a famous beauty at the Restoration court. She married first George Hamilton and then Richard Talbot, Earl of Tyrconnell. She was vicereine in Dublin Castle while Tyrconnell was viceroy (lord deputy) of Ireland for James II. She lived through difficult times after the death of her second husband, who was attainted as a Jacobite, but recovered some of his wealth and died a devout Catholic despite having been raised as a Protestant.

== Birth and origins ==
Frances was born about 1649 at Sandridge, Hertfordshire, England, as the third of the nine children, four sons and five daughters of Richard Jennings and his wife Frances Thornhurst. Her father was a landowner and a Member of Parliament, and so had been her grandfather. Both sat for the Borough of St Albans. Her father sided with the Parliament during the English Civil War.

Her mother was a daughter of Sir Gifford Thornhurst, the first and last Baronet Thornhurst of Agnes Court, and Susan Temple. Frances's parents had married in 1643. Of the nine children only Frances and her sister Sarah are noteworthy. Sarah would become Duchess of Marlborough.

Frances listed among her siblings
She appears below among her siblings as the third child:
1. Susanna (1645–1655), who was the first-born but died young
2. John (c. 1647 – 1674), who succeeded his father
3. Frances (c. 1649 – 1731)
4. Barbara (1651/2– 1678), who married Edward Griffith
5. Richard (1653–1654), died an infant
6. Richard (1654–1655), died an infant
7. Susanna (1656–1657), died an infant
8. Ralph (1656–1677)
9. Sarah (1660–1744), who married John Churchill, 1st Duke of Marlborough

Family tree

Frances Jennings with her two husbands, her parents, her married daughters (the three viscountesses), her sons-in-law, and other selected relatives. (Note: This family tree is partly derived from the Abercorn pedigree pictured in Cokayne. Also see the list of children in the text.)

James; 1st Earl; Abercorn; 1575–1618	Marion; Boyd d. 1632; Recusant	John; Jennings d. 1642; MP
James; 2nd Earl d. c. 1670	George; 1st Bt. Donalong c. 1607 – 1679	Richard; Jennings c. 1619 – 1668; MP	Frances; Thornhurst
James c. 1630 – 1673; Courtier	Elizabeth; 1641–1708; Beauty	George d. 1676; Soldier	Frances; Jennings c. 1647 – 1731	Richard; Talbot; Earl; Tyrconnell; 1630–1691
Richard; 1st Viscount; Rosse; 1657–1703	Elizabeth; 1667–1724	Henry; 8th Viscount; Dillon d. 1713	Frances d. 1751	Nicholas; 3rd Viscount; Barnewall; 1668–1725	Mary; 1676–1736
Richard; 1st Earl d. 1741	Richard; 9th Viscount d. 1737	Henry; 4th Viscount; 1708–1774

Legend

XXX	Subject of the article	XXX	Earls of Abercorn	XXX	Earls of Tyrconnell

XXX	Viscounts & earls of Rosse	XXX	Viscounts; Dillon	XXX	Viscounts; Barnewall

The spelling of her maiden name varies widely. All the three following forms were used during her lifetime: Jennings, (Note: The memorial plaque in the church of the Scots College in Paris spells her name Jennings.) Jenings, Jenyns.

== Restoration court ==
Frances Jennings was about 11 when the Restoration (1660) brought the end of the Commonwealth and put Charles II on the throne. In 1664, aged about 15, Jennings was appointed maid of honour to Anne Hyde, the Duchess of York. Anne was the first wife of the James, Duke of York, the younger brother of the King and future King James II. Frances's beauty earned her the nickname "La Belle Jennings." Macaulay describes her as “beautiful Fanny Jennings, the loveliest coquette in the brilliant Whitehall of the Restoration". She figures in the Mémoires du comte de Grammont (Memoirs for short), written by Anthony Hamilton, younger brother of her future husband George Hamilton, which describes the life at the Restoration court. The three oldest of the six Hamilton brothers, James, George, and Anthony, belonged to the inner circle around the King at Whitehall, as they were fashionable young men and had been in exile with him.

An incident in which Jennings disguised herself as an orange seller is told in the Memoirs and also, with less detail, in Pepys's diary. According to the Memoirs, she and her friend Miss Price wanted to consult a fortune-teller incognito. They went out disguising themselves as orange sellers.

Jennings was courted by the Duke of York, the future James II, who thought his wife's maids of honour to be his property, but she refused to play such a role. She was also courted by Richard Talbot and by George Hamilton, second son of Sir George Hamilton.

== First marriage and children ==
In 1665 Frances Jennings married George Hamilton. At that time George was an officer in the Life Guards. Her marriage resembled that of her husband's elder brother James, for whom the king arranged a marriage with a Protestant girl with the purpose of converting him to that religion. The King seemed to have been concerned about the future of his Catholic friends in the army. The King granted the couple a pension of £500 per year. Hers is the sixth of the seven marriages with which end the Memoirs, written by her husband's brother Antoine Hamilton.

Elizabeth, their first child, was born in 1667 and baptised on 21 March at St Margaret's, Westminster, in an Anglican ceremony.

On 28 September 1667, all Catholic soldiers were dismissed from the Life Guards. Hamilton then took French service. She followed him to France and converted to the Catholic religion.

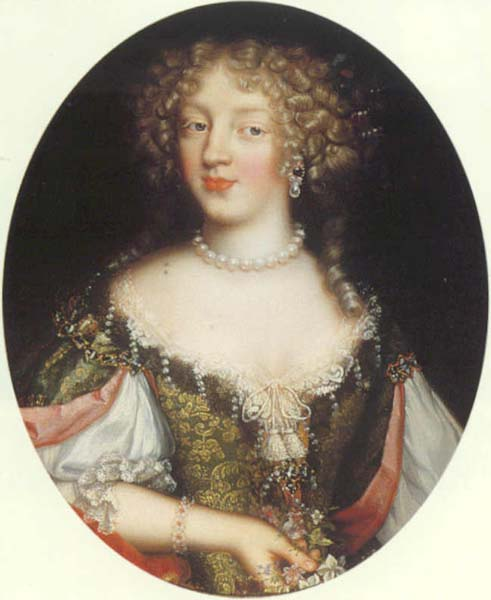
Frances Jennings (Note: Painted by Henri Gascar, c. 1675)

In 1671 Hamilton recruited a regiment in Ireland and served under Turenne and then under his successors, first Condé and then Luxembourg. Her husband was considered a count in France and she therefore became comtesse Hamilton.

The couple seems to have had six children, but the only ones known by name seem to be the following four daughters:

1. Elizabeth (1667–1724), married Richard Parsons, 1st Viscount Rosse in 1685, and was mother of Richard Parsons, 1st Earl of Rosse
2. Frances (d. 1751), married Henry Dillon, 8th Viscount Dillon in 1687
3. Mary (1676–1736), married Nicholas Barnewall, 3rd Viscount Barnewall in 1688
4. Henrietta seems to have been younger than the three listed above. Not much more is known about her.

Elizabeth, the first daughter, was born in England and baptised following the Anglican rite. She married Viscount Rosse, a Protestant loyal to James II in 1685. Her husband was one of the only five Protestant lay members of the Irish House of Lords of the Patriot Parliament summoned by James II in 1688. The younger daughters were born in France and baptised in the Catholic church. Frances and Mary married Catholic men. Henrietta does not seem to have married.

Early in June 1676 comte Hamilton was killed by a musket-shot in a rear-guard action at the Col de Saverne and she was widowed.

On 7 July Charles II created the widow Baroness Rosse and Countess of Bantry "for life".

== Second marriage ==
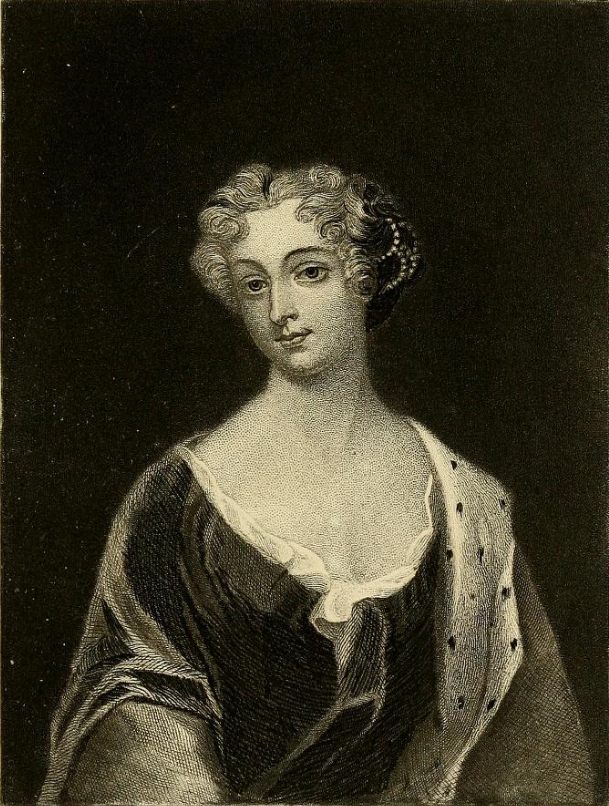
Portrait of Miss Jennings from the Gebbie edition of the Memoirs of Count Grammont

Frances remarried in 1681 in Paris, taking as her second husband an old suitor she had previously rejected: Richard Talbot. Her husband was appointed Lord Deputy of Ireland (viceroy) and the couple lived in Dublin. He oversaw a dramatic expansion of the Irish Army, transforming it from a mainly Protestant to a Catholic force. Talbot was created Earl of Tyrconnell in the peerage of Ireland in 1685 and she became Countess of Tyrconnell.

In 1688 during the Glorious Revolution James II fled England and was replaced with Queen Mary and King William. However, in 1689 James II landed in Ireland trying to regain his kingdoms. Soon after his arrival, on 20 March 1689, he made Tyrconnell a duke and she became duchess. This title is in the Jacobite peerage. Nonetheless, Frances is frequently called Duchess of Tyrconnell. They had no children.

In 1690, after James II's defeat at the Battle of the Boyne, the king fled to Dublin Castle and was met by Frances. According to later sources, King James remarked, ‘Your countrymen, madam, can run well’ and Lady Tyrconnell replied, ‘Not quite so well as your majesty, for I see that you have won the race’.

In August 1690 Lady Tyrconnell fled to France with her daughters and 40,000 gold coins. She became one of the ladies-in-waiting of Mary of Modena, exiled Queen of England at the Château of Saint-Germain-en-Laye. Her husband stayed in Ireland and died during the Siege of Limerick on 14 August 1691.

== Later life ==
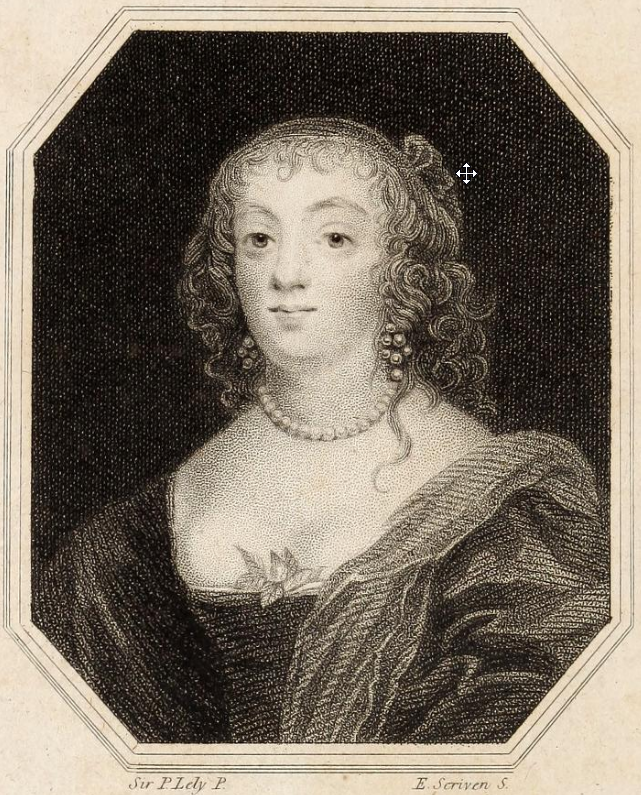
Engraving by Edward Scriven of a painting by Peter Lely of Frances Jennings

In 1691 or 1692, after her husband's death, she was allowed to visit England to petition for the possession of the Irish lands that had been settled upon her as her jointure when she married Tyrconnell and which had been confiscated after his attainder in 1689. It might have been at this visit to London that, out of necessity, she had a dressmaker's stall at the New Exchange in the Strand in Westminster. She dressed in white with her face covered by a white mask and was described as "the white milliner". This episode was dramatised by Douglas Jerrold and performed at Covent Garden in 1841 under the title "The white Milliner: A Comedy in two Acts".

Relief of Charlotte Talbot for Forfeited Estates in Ireland Act 1702
- Act of Parliament
- Parliament of England
- Long title: An Act for the Relief of Charlotte Talbot, with relation to the forfeited Estates in Ireland.
- Citation: 1 Ann. c. 70 Pr.
- Territorial extent: England and Wales

Dates
- Royal assent: 25 May 1702
- Commencement: 8 March 1702 (Note: Start of session.)

Status: Current legislation

Lady Tyrconnell returned to France and was then in 1693 indicted herself of high treason. After Queen Anne had acceded the throne in 1702, she and her stepdaughter, Charlotte Talbot, eventually recovered the lands due to them in 1703 by a private act of Parliament, the Relief of Charlotte Talbot for Forfeited Estates in Ireland Act 1702 (1 Ann. c. 70 Pr.) — presumably through her sister Sarah's influence with the Queen. Eventually she retired to the Dominican Convent at Channel Row, Dublin, and lived there as a parlour boarder from 1723–1724. She then built a house on North King Street and obtained the permission to establish a Poor Clares convent in it.

== Death and timeline ==
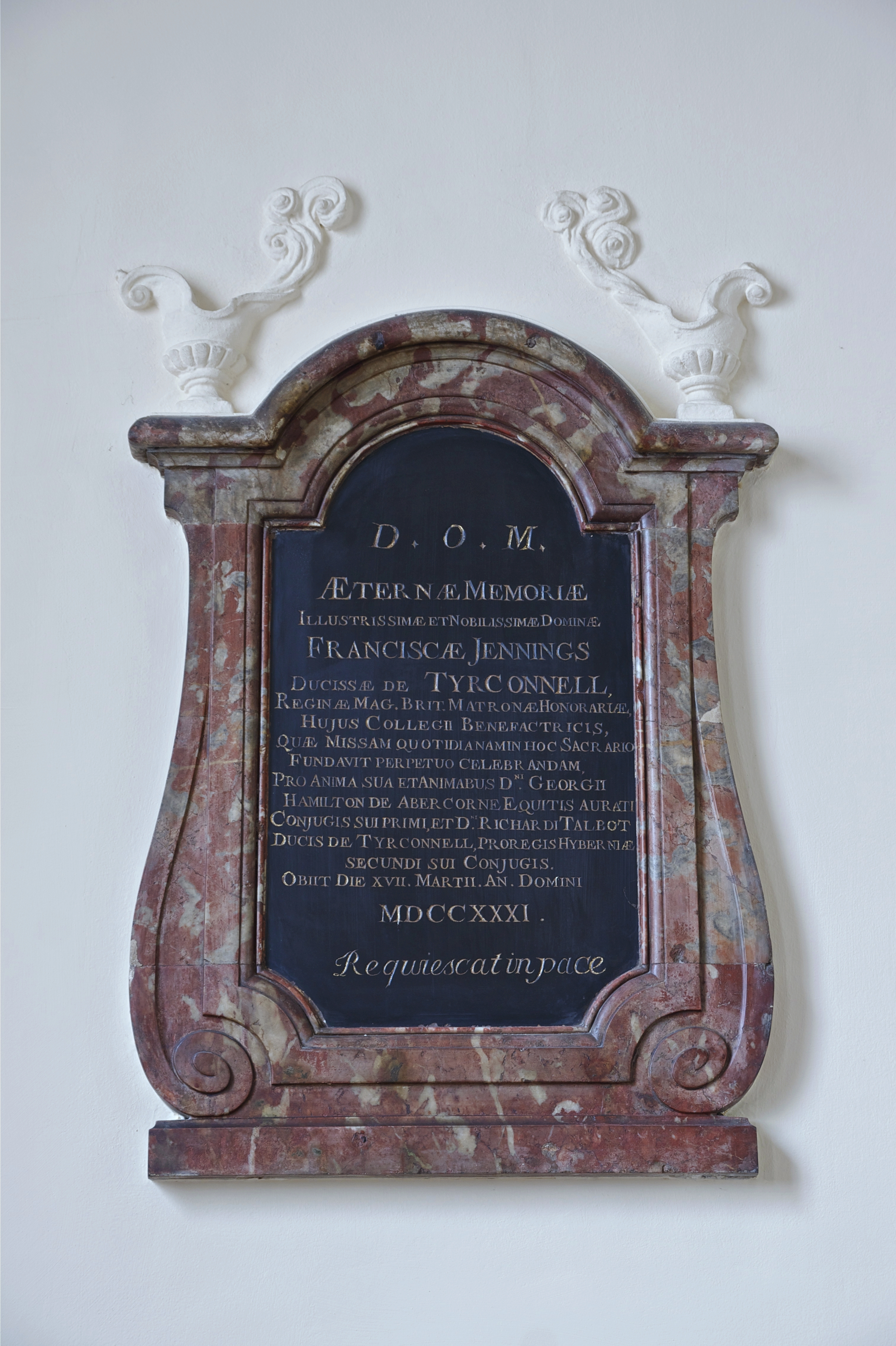
Memorial plaque in the chapel of the former Scots College in Paris

In 1731 Frances died in Dublin at the Poor Clares convent that she had founded. She was buried on 9 March in St Patrick's Cathedral in Dublin. (Note: Burke states that Frances Talbot was 92 when she died. This age is certainly exaggerated as we know that her parents married in 1643.)

She also funded a mass to be celebrated daily for ever at the chapel of the Scots College in Paris for the benefit of her soul and for those of both her husbands as can still be read on the memorial plaque affixed to the wall of this church (see photo). The Latin inscription translates into English as:

To God, most good, most great.
To the most illustrious and noble Lady
Frances Jennings,
Duchess of Tyrconnell,
Lady-in-waiting of the Queen of Great Britain,
benefactrice of this College,
who founded a daily mass in this sanctuary
to be celebrated for ever
for her soul and those of Sir George
Hamilton of Abercorn, knight
her first husband, and Sir Richard Talbot,
duke of Tyrconnell, Viceroy of Ireland,
her second husband.
She died on 17 March 1731.
May she rest in peace. (Note: The original Latin inscription reads: D. O. M. Aeternae memoriae Illustrissiae et Nobilissimae Dominae Franciscae Jennings Ducissae de Tyrconnell Reginae Mag. Brit. Matronae Honorariae, Huius Collegi Benefactricis, quae Missam quotidianam in hoc Sacrario fundavit perpetuo celebrandam, Pro Anima sua et Animabus Dni Georgii Hamilton de Abercorne Equitis Aurati Conjugis sui primi, et Dni Richardi Talbot Ducis de Tyrconnell, Proregis Hiberniæ secundi sui Conjugis. Obiit Die XVII Martii Anno Domini MDCCXXXI. Requiescat in pace.)

As the memorial plaque is in France, the text gives the date of her death according to the Gregorian calendar, which had been adopted in France in 1582 but would be adopted in England only in 1752. This new-style date of death (17 March 1731) differs from the old-style one usually found in English texts (6 March 1731).

Timeline
As his birth date is uncertain, so are all his ages. Italics for historical background.
Age	Date	Event
0	About 1649	Born at Sandridge manor, Hertfordshire, England.
10–11	29 May 1660	Restoration of Charles II
10–11	5 Jun 1660	Sister Sarah born
14–15	1664	Appointed maid of honour to Anne Hyde, Duchess of York;
15–16	1665	Married George Hamilton, her 1st husband.
17–18	1667	Elizabeth, her eldest born.
17–18	28 Sep 1667	1st husband dismissed from the Life Guards, they went to France.
26–27	Early Jun 1676	1st husband killed in a rearguard action on the Col de Saverne.
31–32	1681	Married Richard Talbot, her 2nd husband.
35–36	1685	Daughter Elizabeth married Richard Parsons, 1st Viscount Rosse.
35–36	6 Feb 1685	Accession of James II, succeeding Charles II
35–36	20 Jun 1685	2nd husband made Earl of Tyrconnell and she became countess.
37–38	8 Jan 1687	2nd husband appointed Lord Lieutenant of Ireland
39–40	13 Feb 1689	Accession of William and Mary, succeeding James II
39–40	12 Mar 1689	James II lands at Kinsale, Ireland
39–40	20 Mar 1689	2nd husband made duke by James II and she became duchess.
40–41	1 Jun 1690	Received James II back from the Battle of the Boyne at Dublin Castle.
41–42	14 Aug 1691	2nd husband died in Limerick.
52–53	8 Mar 1702	Accession of Anne, succeeding William III
64–65	1 Aug 1714	Accession of George I, succeeding Anne
77–78	11 Jun 1727	Accession of George II, succeeding George I
80–81	9 Mar 1730	Died in Dublin (new style: 17 March 1731).

== Bibliography ==
- Anonymous (1833). "King James the Second". Dublin Penny Journal. Vol. 1. Dublin: Smith Elder & Co. pp. 325–326.
- Bagwell, Richard (1898). "Talbot, Richard, Earl and titular Duke of Tyrconnel (1630–1691)". In Lee, Sidney (ed.). Dictionary of National Biography. Vol. LV. London: Smith, Elder, & Co. pp. 331–336. OCLC 8544105.
- Bryan, Deidre (October 2009). "Talbot, Frances". Dictionary of Irish Biography.
- Burke, Bernard (1869). A Genealogical and Heraldic Dictionary of the Peerage and Baronetage of the British Empire (31st ed.). London: Harrison. OCLC 1045624502. (for siblings Elizabeth, Thomas, John, Lucia, Margaret and daughters)
- Burke, Bernard; Burke, Ashworth P. (1915). A Genealogical and Heraldic History of the Peerage and Baronetage, the Privy Council, Knightage and Companionage (77th ed.). London: Harrison. OCLC 1155471554.
- Clark, Ruth (1921). Anthony Hamilton: his Life and Works and his Family. London: John Lane. OCLC 459281163.
- Daniell, F. H. Blackburne, ed. (1911). Calendar of State Papers, Domestic Series, March 1st, 1677, to February 28th, 1678. Calendar of state papers. Domestic series. London: His/Her Majesty's Stationery Office. OCLC 271079796. – 1677 to 1678 (for daughter Henrietta)
- Debrett, John (1828). Peerage of the United Kingdom of Great Britain and Ireland. Vol. I (17th ed.). London: F. C. and J. Rivington. OCLC 54499602. – England
- Fryde, E. B.; Greenway, D. E.; Porter, S.; Roy, I., eds. (1986). Handbook of British Chronology. Royal Historical Society Guides and Handbooks, No. 2 (3rd ed.). London: Offices of the Royal Historical Society. ISBN 0-86193-106-8. – (for timeline)
- G. E. C. (1910). Gibbs, Vicary (ed.). The Complete Peerage of England, Scotland, Ireland, Great Britain and the United Kingdom, Extant, Extinct, or Dormant. Vol. I (2nd ed.). London: The St Catherine Press. OCLC 1042385438. – Ab-Adam to Basing (for Barnewall)
- Green, David (1967). Sarah Churchill, Duchess of Marlborough. New York: Charles Scribner's Sons. ISBN 0-684-12467-X.
- Haile, Martin (1905). Queen Mary of Modena, her Life and her Letters. London: J. M. Dent & Co. OCLC 457559782.
- Hamilton, Anthony (1713). Mémoires de la vie du comte de Grammont (in French). Cologne: Pierre Marteau. OCLC 1135254578. – Princeps (for "la belle Jennings")
- Hamilton, Anthony (1811). Mémoires de la vie du comte de Grammont (in French). Vol. II. London: William Miller. OCLC 719396809. (for the picture)
- Hamilton, Anthony (1888). Memoirs of Count Grammont. Translated by Walpole, Horace. Philadelphia: Gebbie & Co. OCLC 1048777116. (for English text)
- Jerrold, Douglas (1841). The White milliner: A Comedy in two Acts. Lacy's acting edition. London: Thomas Hailes Lacy. OCLC 1013410956.
- Macaulay (1898). The History of England from the Accession of James the Second. Vol. IV (Albany ed.). London: Longman, Green, Longman, Roberts, & Green. OCLC 487364786. – to end of 1690 (for "loveliest coquette")
- Ó Ciardha, Éamonn (October 2009). "Hamilton, Sir George". In McGuire, James; Quinn, James (eds.). Dictionary of Irish Biography (online ed.).
- O'Heyne, John (1902). Coleman, Ambrose (ed.). The Irish Dominicans of the Seventeenth Century. Dundalk: William Tempest. OCLC 3455671. – Translation from the original Latin published in Louvain in 1706
- Paul, James Balfour, ed. (1904). The Scots Peerage, Founded on Wood's Edition of Sir Robert Douglas's Peerage of Scotland. Vol. I. Edinburgh: David Douglas. OCLC 505064285. – Abercorn to Balmerino
- Pepys, Samuel (1894). Wheatley, Henry Benjamin (ed.). The Diary of Samuel Pepys. Vol. IV. London: George Bell and Sons. OCLC 503692830. – 1 January 1664 to 29/30 June 1665
- Sergeant, Philip W. (1913a). Little Jennings and Fighting Dick Talbot: A Life of the Duke and Duchess of Tyrconnel. Vol. I. London: Hutchinson & Co. OCLC 474495830. – 1643 to 1685
- Sergeant, Philip W. (1913b). Little Jennings and Fighting Dick Talbot: A Life of the Duke and Duchess of Tyrconnel. Vol. II. London: Hutchinson & Co. OCLC 474495830. – 1686 to 1702, notes, & appendices
- Simms, J. G. (1969). Jacobite Ireland, 1685–91. London: Routledge & Kegan Paul. ISBN 978-0-7100-6446-2.
- Simms, J. G. (1986). War and Politics in Ireland 1649–1730. London: The Hambledon Press. ISBN 0-907628-72-9.
- Sisters, The (1894). Annals of the Dominican Convent of St. Mary's, Cabra, with some Account of its Origin: 1647–1912. Dublin: St. Mary's, Cabra.
- Story, George (1693). An Impartial History of the Wars of Ireland. London: Richard Chiswell. OCLC 858717314.
- Walford, Edward (1887). Old and New London. Vol. III. London: Cassell, Petter, Galpin & Co. OCLC 1049974157. – Westminster and the western suburbs
- Wauchope, Piers (2004). "Talbot [née Jenyns; other married name Hamilton], Frances, duchess of Tyrconnell (1648–1731)". In Matthew, Colin; Harrison, Brian (eds.). Oxford Dictionary of National Biography. Vol. 53. New York: Oxford University Press. pp. 688–689. ISBN 0-19-861403-9.
- Weinreb, Ben; Hibbert, Christopher (2008). The London Encyclopædia. Bethesda, ML: Adler & Adler. ISBN 978-0-917561-07-8.
- Witherow, Thomas (1879). Derry and Enniskillen in the Year 1689. London & Belfast: William Mallan & Son. OCLC 82779901.
