= Nicholas Barnewall =

Nicholas Barnewall may refer to:

- Nicholas Barnewall (Irish judge) (died after 1465), Lord Chief Justice of Ireland
- Nicholas Barnewall, 1st Viscount Barnewall (1592–1663), Irish landowner and politician
- Nicholas Barnewall, 3rd Viscount Barnewall (1668–1725), Irish nobleman
- Nicholas Barnewall, 14th Baron Trimlestown (1726–1813), Irish landowner
