= Thomas Barnewall =

Thomas Barnewall may refer to:

- Thomas Barnewall, 13th Baron Trimlestown (died 1796), Irish noble
- Thomas Barnewall, 16th Baron Trimlestown (1796–1879), Irish landowner
