= John Cruys =

Irish soldier, diplomat and judge (died 1407)

Sir John Cruys or Cruise (died 1407) was a prominent Irish military commander, diplomat and judge of the late fourteenth and early fifteenth centuries. He was one of the most substantial landowners in County Dublin and County Meath and built Merrion Castle near Dublin City in the 1360s. His marriage to the heiress of the powerful Verdon family of Clonmore brought him in addition substantial lands in County Louth. He sat in the Irish Parliament and was a member of the King's Council. He was a highly regarded public servant, but also a determined and acquisitive man of business, who fought a ten-year battle to establish his wife's right to her inheritance.

== Background ==
He was the son of Simon Cruys (died after 1366) and his wife and cousin Margaret Cruys, daughter and heiress of John Cruys of Cruisetown, County Louth. The Cruys or Cruise family, of Anglo-Norman origin, who first settled in Cornwall, came to Ireland with King Henry II of England during the Norman Invasion of Ireland in the late twelfth century. They acquired substantial lands, including Cruisetown in County Meath and Naul, where one Robert de Cruys (died 1292) held the lands in the time of King Edward I. Simon held a number of official positions, including Chief Serjeant of Leinster and Escheator of County Dublin in 1366. The John Cruys who was a merchant in Dublin in the early 1400s is not known to have been a relative of Sir John.

== Merrion Castle and other Cruys holdings ==
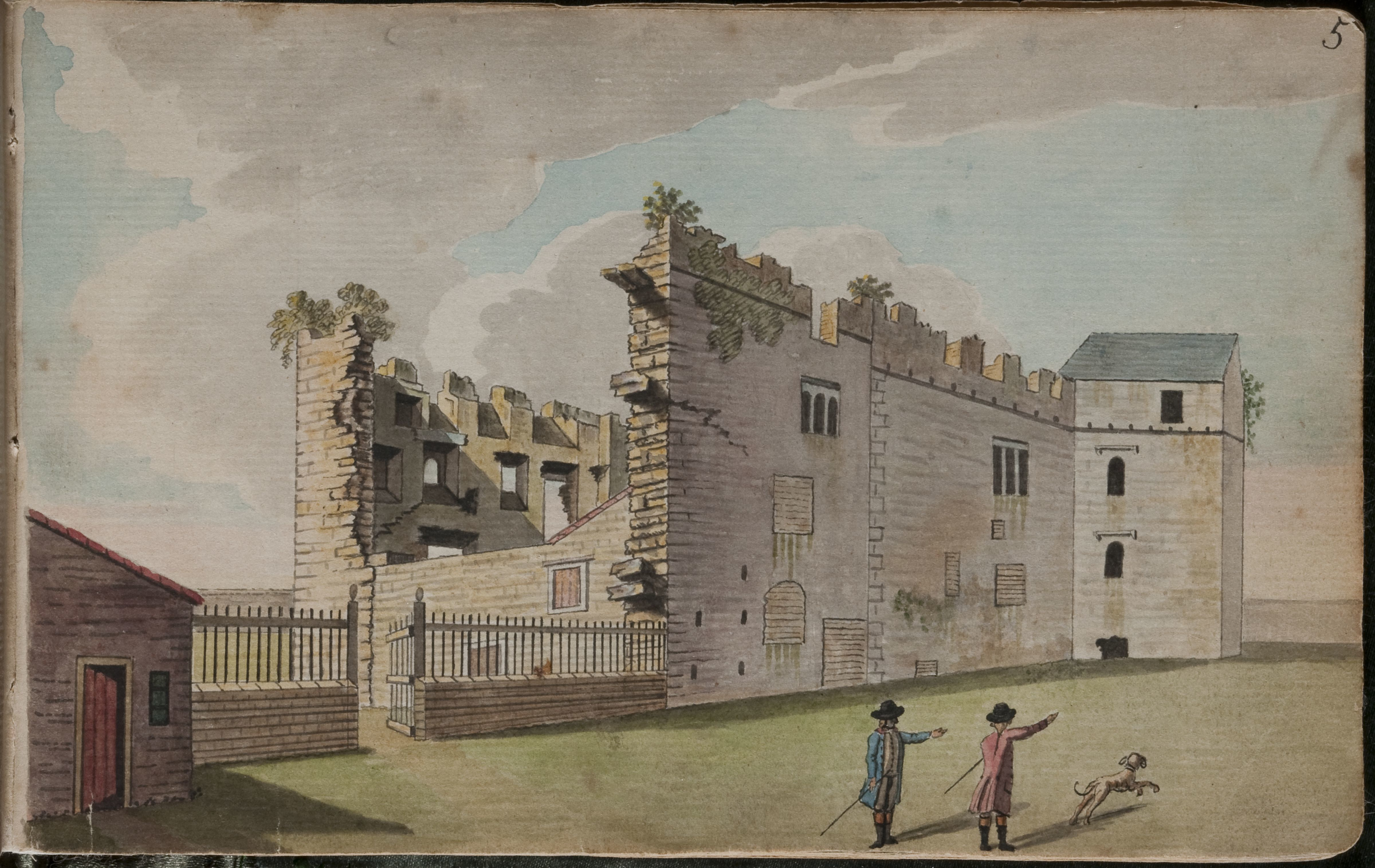
Ruins of Merrion Castle, painted by Gabriel Beranger, eighteenth century. Cruys built Merrion in the 1360s.

In 1366 John Bathe of Rathfeigh, County Meath (a member of another prominent Anglo-Irish family, who were later based at Drumcondra, Dublin) granted to John Cruys the lands of Thorncastle, i.e. modern-day Mount Merrion and Booterstown, and the fisheries attached (which are mentioned in an earlier Crown grant of 1299 to William le Deveneys) and other lands at Donnybrook and Ballymun in Dublin. On his lands at Thorncastle, Cruys built Merrion Castle (although there are references to an earlier structure on the site), which became his principal dwelling. There is a reference to his being dispossessed of his lands there in the early 1390s, apparently due to the hostile action of Irish clans from County Wicklow. He also inherited the family's estates at nearby Stillorgan and at Naul, and acquired other lands in Dublin, Meath and, in right of his wife Matilda Verdon, in Louth. He held most of his lands directly from the English Crown, and in 1391 he was excused for life from paying the Crown rent on his lands at Thorncastle, due to their devastation by hostile Irish clans, "as they are so frequently burned and destroyed", noted the Patent Rolls. In 1414 his son Thomas was forgiven repayment of the arrears. However a later owner, James Fitzwilliam, who was Sir John's son-in-law, was required to pay rent to the Crown on Thorncastle of £5 and 8 shillings per year. In 1389 Sir John was forgiven repayment of the Crown rent of 40 shillings on his manor of Stillorgan, no doubt for the same reason.

== Career ==
In 1376 he was sent to England with Maurice FitzGerald, 4th Earl of Kildare, on important diplomatic business, including a report to the English Crown on the state of Irish affairs, and was paid £20 for his expenses of the journey. The money may also have been, in part, redress for the devastation of his lands at Booterstown by the O'Byrne family in his absence, of which he later complained in a petition to the Crown.

During the turbulent Lord Lieutenancy of Sir William de Windsor (1369–1376), Cruys was a close ally of Windsor. After Windsor's recall in disgrace in 1376, Cruys was out of favour for a time: according to a petition which he co-signed in 1379, the petitioners pleaded that they had been threatened with prosecution and forfeiture of their lands. However, any check to his career was short-lived.

In 1380 he was summoned to the session of the Irish Parliament which met at Baltinglass. In 1382 he was appointed joint Guardian of the Peace for Dublin and Meath with William FitzWilliam and others, but stood down by 1391; FitzWilliam was sole Guardian in 1396. He also had judicial functions, and was justice in eyre (circuit) in 1385. In the same year he led a military expedition against the O'Toole clan of County Wicklow, in which he was badly wounded, and received compensation from the Crown for his pains. He was Escheator of Ireland in 1372. According to the Patent Roll of 1407, he also served as Sheriff in 1392 (presumably of either Dublin City or County Dublin, though this is not clearly stated in the Rolls. In that year he acknowledged that he was indebted to the Crown in the sum of £25.

== The Verdon inheritance ==
In 1386 the King's Escheator was ordered to convey to Cruys and his wife Matilda Verdon the lands of Clonmore (now Togher) and Mansfieldtown in County Louth. Matilda, whom he married before 1375, was the daughter and co-heiress with her sister Anna, wife of John Bellew of Bellewstown, of Sir Thomas Verdon of Clonmore (died 1375), head of the dominant Anglo-Norman family in County Louth and his wife Joan Hartort. Matilda's first husband was Peter Howth. Her father was a grand-nephew of Theobald de Verdun, 2nd Baron Verdun (died 1316). Matilda's recovery of Clonmore was the result of a determined and lengthy legal struggle against her male cousins, whom her father had tried to make his heirs, ignoring the clear right of his daughters to inherit his lands.

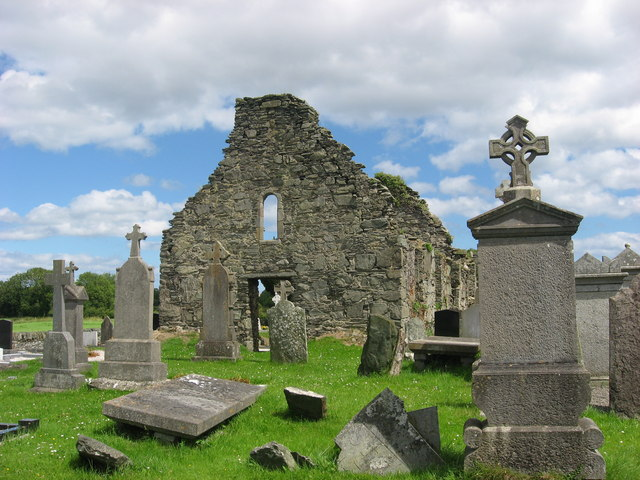
Clonmore, County Louth, which Cruys owned in right of his wife

== Later career ==
In 1389 Cruys was serving as a justice in eyre again. In the same year he and Robert Eure were ordered to inquire into possible breaches of a Parliamentary ordinance forbidding the purchase by English merchants of Irish falcons, which evidently fetched high prices in the English markets. In 1394 he was summoned to the Great Council of Ireland. In 1395 he was paid £20 for supplying men and weapons for the English wars against the Irish of County Wicklow, County Westmeath and other parts of Ireland. He was knighted before 1399. In 1404 he was one of five Commissioners charged with summoning the magnates and commons of Dublin as the need required (presumably in case of a raid by the O'Toole and O'Byrne clans).

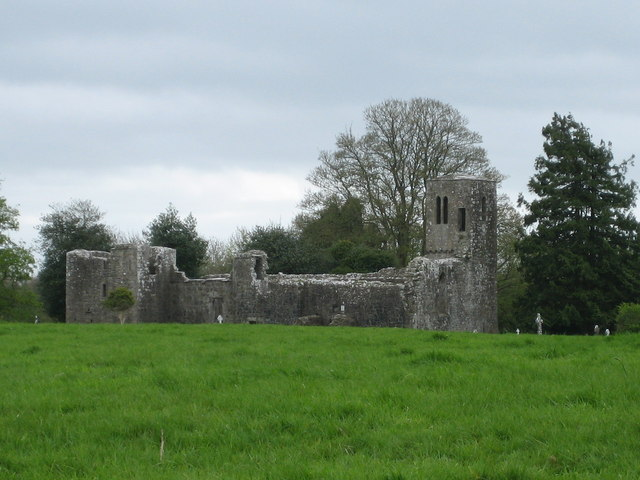
Rathmore, County Meath, a Cruys holding

In 1406 he was given the lands of Rathwire, County Westmeath and the advowson (the right to appoint his own nominee as the parish priest) of the local church, and other lands at Rathmore, County Meath. He died the following year, although he was apparently still alive in April, when the Crown forgave the debts which he incurred as Sheriff and Escheator.

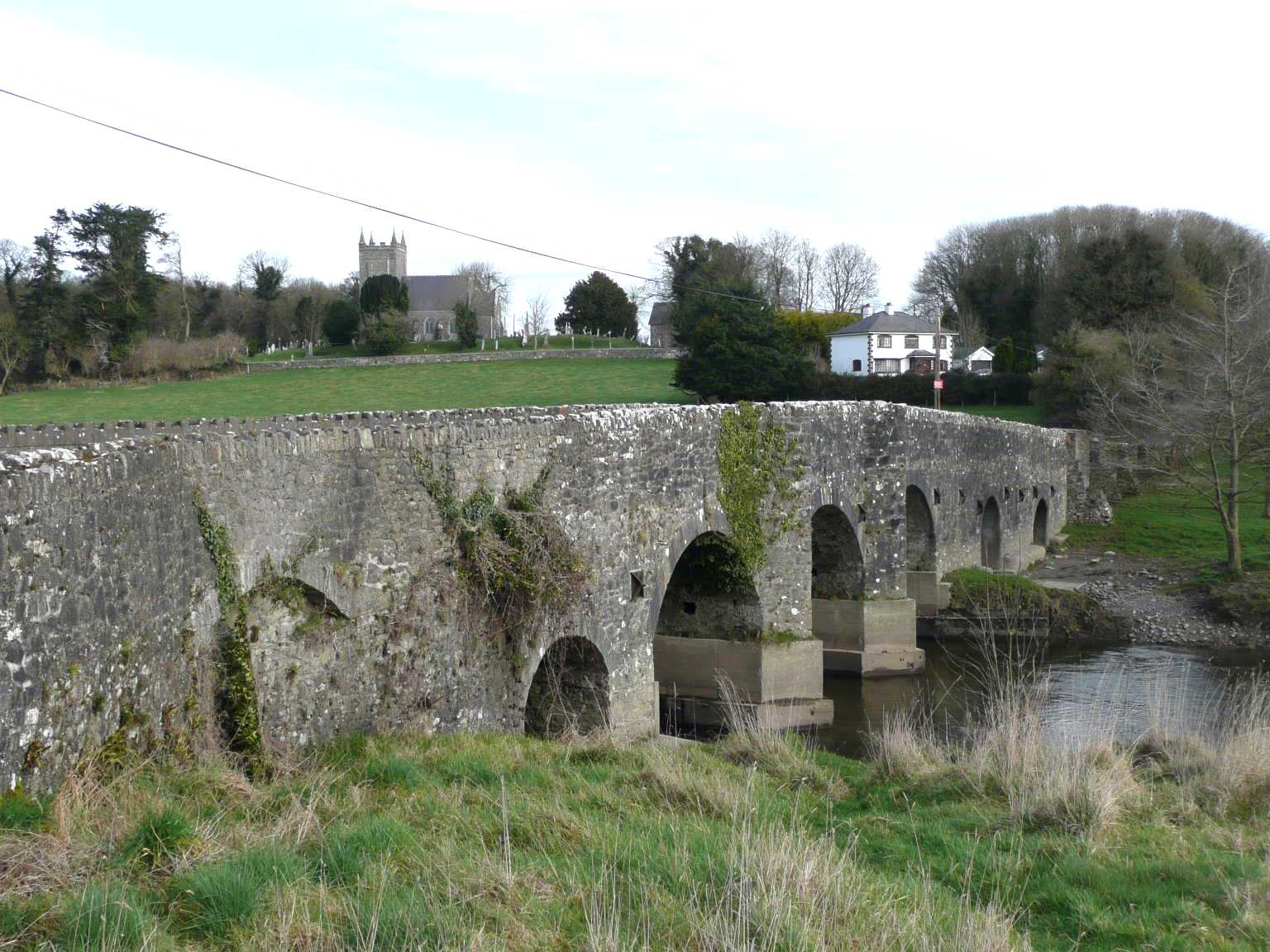
Donaghpatrick, County Meath, a Cruys holding

An inquisition held in 1408 shows the great extent of his holdings: he had estates at Merrion, Thorncastle, Rathmore, Donaghpatrick, Clonmore, Kells, Naul, Duleek and Dundalk.

== Family ==
He and Matilda had at least three children. Sir Thomas Cruys (died 1424), the son and heir, inherited most of his father's estates, which passed to his own son. One daughter, Maria, married Stephen Derpatrick of Stillorgan and had a daughter Katherine. Another daughter married James Fitzwilliam, Chief Baron of the Irish Exchequer, by whom she had at least one son, Phillip. James the year before Sir John's death appears to have attempted to seize the Merrion lands, possibly to forestall entry by Sir John's son Thomas, for which offence he was quickly pardoned. Philip Fitzwilliam in time inherited Merrion Castle, along with most of the Cruys lands, except Rathmore, Naul, which passed to another branch of the Cruys family, who held it until they were dispossessed by Oliver Cromwell, and Stillorgan, which was restored to the Cruys family after the younger Stephen Derpatrick (who seems to have been Sir John's great-grandson) was declared an outlaw in 1439. The Fitzwilliams in time came to own much of Dublin south of the River Liffey.

Sir Thomas Cruys in 1414 received a full pardon for all his (presumably actually his father's) debts and arrears of rent owed to the Crown. Later the same year he granted to William de Preston certain rents from his lands at Dundalk, Duleek and Kells, County Meath. He had leave to visit England in 1421. In 1423 he received another pardon for numerous acts of trespass on estates including Dundalk, Duleek and Kells, which, though they had belonged to his father, required a royal licence for him to enter, apparently because the Gyffard family were in possession of part of them. The pardon vested all these lands in him. He died in the autumn of 1424, leaving two sons, Edward, the eldest son and heir, who was still a minor, and Christopher. Sir Walter Lucy was granted all of Thomas Cruys's estates, until Edward came of age. Edward seems to have died before 1432, when a younger son of Sir Thomas, Christopher, held the Cruys estates in Meath. In 1419 the Cruys lands at Rathmore, County Meath, were granted to John Wych, although the Cruys family is known to have held Rathmore a generation later. It then passed into the Plunket family by marriage.

John's widow Matilda was still alive in 1415, when she exercised her family's right of advowson to appoint the priest to the local church at Clonmore.

== See also ==
- Thomas Fitz-Christopher Plunket

== Sources ==
- Ball, F. Elrington History of Dublin 6 Volumes 1902–1920 Dublin Alexander Thom and Co.
- D'Alton, John King James's Irish Army List Privately Published Dublin 1860.
- O'Kelly, Gerard Titania's Palace and the Mount Merrion Connection Dublin Historical Record 1998 Vol. 51 pp. 91–115.
- Patentee Officers in Ireland 1173–1826
- Smith, Brendan Crisis and Survival in Late Medieval Ireland: the English of Louth and their Neighbours 1330–1450 Oxford University Press 2013
