= John Barnewall (recorder) =

Irish landowner, barrister and judge

Sir John Barnewall (c.1635-c.1705) was an Irish landowner, barrister and judge, who held several judicial offices, including that of Recorder of Dublin 1687-9.

== Background ==
He was born in County Meath, a member of the Crickstown branch of the prominent Barnewall family, which held the title Baron Trimlestown. His grandfather, Sir Patrick Barnewall, was the first of the Barnewall Baronets. John was the second son of Sir Richard Barnewall, 2nd Baronet, and Julia, daughter of Sir Gerald Aylmer, 1st Baronet of Donadea, County Kildare and his wife Julia (or Juliana) Nugent, daughter of Christopher Nugent, 6th Baron Delvin.

== Career ==
He entered the Inner Temple in 1673 and the King's Inns in 1678. His practice as a barrister seems to have been lucrative: while his father had suffered heavy losses during the English Civil War, and only recovered a fraction of his estates at the Restoration, John was wealthy enough to purchase Ballybrittan Castle, near Edenderry, County Offaly.

Since the Barnewall family were staunch Roman Catholics, John was an acceptable choice of judge to the Catholic King James II. In 1687 he was knighted, and became Third Serjeant and Recorder of Dublin. In 1689 he became a Baron of the Court of Exchequer (Ireland). After the downfall of James's cause at the Battle of the Boyne, John was removed from office, but his wealth and family connections apparently protected him from any other reprisals by the new regime, which was inclined to be conciliatory towards those of its former opponents who promised to keep the peace.

== Family and descendants ==
He married Thomasine Preston, daughter of Anthony Preston, 2nd Viscount Tara and his wife and cousin Margaret Warren. Their only daughter and heiress Mary (or Margaret) married, in 1703, her cousin John Barnewall, 11th Baron Trimlestown. Lord Trimlestown died in 1746, and Mary died at a great age in 1771. They had ten children, including

- Robert Barnewall, 12th Baron Trimlestown (c.1704-1779)
- Anthony Barnewall (1721-1739), an army officer, who was said to be a young man of "great promise". He entered the Austrian service, and was killed, aged only eighteen, at the Battle of Grocka, a decisive victory for the Ottoman Sultan, who seized Belgrade
- Richard, father of Nicholas, 14th Baron Trimlestown
- Margaret, who married James Butler, 8th Viscount Mountgarret
- Thomasine, who married Janico Preston, 10th Viscount Gormanston
- Bridget, who married Robert Martyn of Ballynahinch Castle
