= Thomas Fitz-Christopher Plunket =

Irish lawyer and judge

Sir Thomas Fitz-Christopher Plunket (c.1407–1471) was a leading Irish lawyer and judge of the fifteenth century who held office as Lord Chief Justice of Ireland. He was an ancestor of the Duke of Wellington in the female line. His second marriage to the heiress Marian Cruise (or Cruys) inspired the ballad The Song of Mary Cruys.

== Family ==
Thomas was born about 1407 in County Meath, third of the seven sons of Sir Christopher Plunket, who married Janet Cusack in 1403, the heiress of Killeen Castle, Dunsany.

Thomas's brother Christopher was the 1st Baron Dunsany.

Thomas's sister Matilda "Maud" (Plunket) Hussey Artois Talbot Cornewalsh was "the Bride of Malahide".

Thomas's nephew Christopher (son of John Plunkett and Elizabeth Hollywood) was the 1st Baron Killeen. Both founded prominent Anglo-Irish dynasties. It was said that Thomas was "bred to the law": he and his younger brother Robert were the first two of numerous lawyers and judges in the Plunket family.

Another of Thomas's nephews was Sir Thomas Plunket of Dunsoghly Castle, Chief Justice of the Irish Common Pleas. This second Sir Thomas was the son of Sir Robert Plunket, who was briefly Lord Chief Justice in 1447.

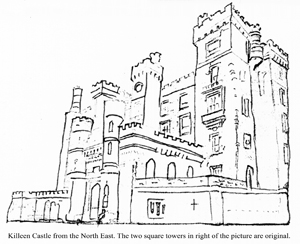
Killeen Castle, Co. Meath

== Career ==
Thomas became Serjeant-at-law (Ireland) in 1434. At that time the holder of this office was the senior legal adviser to the Crown. He was entrusted with levying subsidies in 1447, and with surveying the royal mines in 1450. He was made a justice of assize in County Meath, and was entrusted with the defence of the county in 1456. There is good reason to believe that he was admitted to Lincoln's Inn in 1452-3, although the name is spelt "Blonket" in the records.

During the Wars of the Roses Thomas, like most of the Anglo-Irish gentry of the Pale, was a supporter of the would-be King Richard of York; he accompanied him to England in 1460 and was knighted. After the triumph of York's son, King Edward IV in 1461, Plunket was appointed Lord Chief Justice, but was forced to contest the position with his predecessor, Sir Nicholas Barnewall. He was reappointed in 1463 and confirmed in office in 1468, jointly with John Chevir.

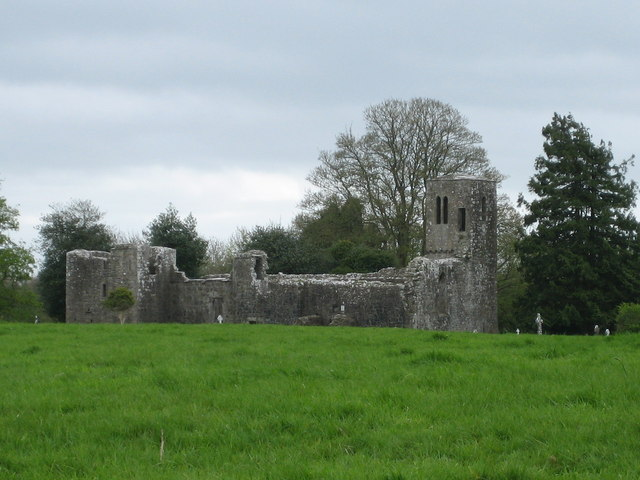
Rathmore Church, County Meath, Plunket's resting place

In 1462, as a mark of royal favour, he was allowed to take twelve trees from Trim Park.

He died on 12 June 1471, bequeathing the sum of £100 to Christ Church Cathedral, Dublin. He was buried in Rathmore Church, Rathmore, County Meath, where an impressive tomb was erected to the memory of Thomas and his second wife Marian Cruise. Rathmore Church is now a ruin, but the tomb, with the effigies of the couple, is still visible. The effigy of Thomas, wearing a suit of armour, is in good condition; Marion's has decayed badly.

== Marriages and children ==
He married firstly Genet Cusack, and by her had one son who probably predeceased him. He married secondly Marion, or Marionne Cruise (or Cruys), daughter and heiress of Sir Christopher Cruise of Rathmore, County Meath, and in her right became Lord of the Manor of Rathmore. His second marriage, though advantageous, was said to be a love affair. There are several romantic stories about the marriage, and a celebrated ballad, "The Song of Mary Cruys", describes how Thomas as a young barrister in London restored Marion, then a penniless refugee in England, to her rightful inheritance. How much truth there is in the story that Marian and her mother were forced to flee from their home in fear of their lives after her father's murder is uncertain, but violence was endemic in fifteenth century Ireland, as it was in England, so the story may have some basis in fact. Marian's father was probably a descendant of the wealthy politician and landowner Sir John Cruys of Thorncastle (died 1407), who included Rathmore among his many estates. Sir John had a grandson called Christopher, who was living in 1432.

In 1452 Katherine Symean, widow of George Symean of Trim, recovered two houses in Kells which she and her late husband held from Marion and Thomas jointly, and which had been seized by her husband's creditors after his death.

Thomas and Marian had five children:

- Edmund, who inherited Rathmore but died without issue
- Sir Alexander Plunket, Lord Chancellor of Ireland
- Ismay, who married Sir William de Wellesley of Dangan: their children included
  - Walter Wellesley, Bishop of Kildare and Prior of Great Connell Priory,
  - Garett Wellesley, ancestor of the Duke of Wellington, and
  - Alison, who married John Cusack of Cushinstown, County Meath, and was the mother of several children, including Sir Thomas Cusack, Lord Chancellor of Ireland
- Margaret, who married Barnaby Barnewall, judge of the Court of King's Bench (Ireland), no issue
- Elizabeth, who married Christopher Barnewall, 2nd Baron Trimleston; their eldest son John, 3rd Baron, was, like his uncles Alexander and Thomas, Lord Chancellor of Ireland. They had several other children, including Robert, Alison and Ismay.

== See also ==
- John Cruys

Legal offices
Preceded by Nicholas Barnewall	Lord Chief Justice of Ireland; 1461	Succeeded by Nicholas Barnewall
Preceded by Nicholas Barnewall	Lord Chief Justice of Ireland; 1463 or before-1468	Succeeded by John Chevir
