= Patrick Barnewall =

Patrick Barnewall may refer to:

- Patrick Barnewall (judge) (c. 1500–1552), Solicitor General for Ireland
- Patrick Barnewall (died 1622), grandson of the above
- Sir Patrick Barnewall, 1st Baronet (died 1624), of the Barnewall baronets

== See also ==
- Barnewall (disambiguation)
