= Barnwall =

Barnwall may refer to:

- Barnwall Manor

== See also ==
- Barnewall (disambiguation)
