= James Crofton =

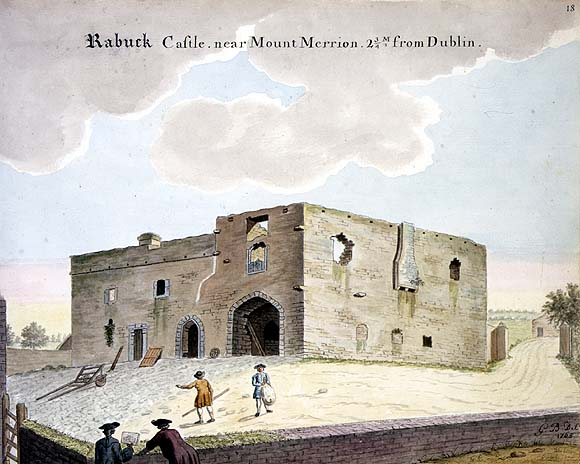
Ruins of Roebuck Castle by Gabriel Beranger, 1765.

James Crofton was the Chief Clerk of the Irish Treasury in 1804.

He married Frances Stanley on 9 January 1797 in the parish of St. Ann's when he was recorded as living at Kildare Street.

Around 1802 he purchased Roebuck Castle, County Dublin, from Nicholas Barnewall, 14th Baron Trimlestown.

Crofton was also harbour commissioner of the Royal Harbour of George IV at Kingstown from 1816 until his death in 1828 and along with his eldest son Arthur Burgh Crofton was responsible for the development of the new harbour. Crofton Road in Dún Laoghaire was renamed from Susan Street in their honour in 1876. His son Arthur Burgh Crofton was also Sheriff of County Dublin in 1842.

He died on 2 June 1828 and is buried at Taney graveyard.
