= Alexander Plunket =

Irish statesman and judge

Alexander Plunket (died 1503) was an Irish statesman and judge of the fifteenth century.

He was appointed Lord Chancellor of Ireland by King Henry VII of England in 1492. Rowland FitzEustace, 1st Baron Portlester was Lord Chancellor and Lord Treasurer of Ireland before Plunket. The offices were split between Alexander Plunket and Sir James Ormond, who became Lord Treasurer of Ireland. Ireland was in great conflict at this time, as Henry VII tried to get the Irish to pledge loyalty to him, instead of their own Kings and Princes. O'Flanagan states that it is impossible to form any opinion on his career as Lord Chancellor, since no record of any of his judgments exists.

== Biography ==
He was born at Rathmore in County Meath, son of Sir Thomas Fitz-Christopher Plunket, Lord Chief Justice of the King's Bench in Ireland and his second wife Marion Cruys (or Cruise), daughter of Sir Christopher Cruys; he was a first cousin of another Sir Thomas Plunket who became Chief Justice of the Irish Common Pleas, both being grandsons of Christopher Plunket, 1st Baron Killeen.

He married firstly Anne Marward, daughter of Richard Marward, titular Baron Skryne; secondly, Margaret Butler, daughter of James Butler of Polestown, and sister of Piers Butler, 8th Earl of Ormonde, and thirdly a close relative (possibly a daughter) of Gerald FitzGerald, 8th Earl of Kildare. He had children by all three marriages, nine sons and two daughters in all.

Through his second and third marriages, he was connected to the families of both the Earl of Kildare and the Earl of Ormonde; his political loyalties at first were with the Kildare faction, but he later quarrelled with Kildare. He was a companion of the Brotherhood of Saint George, a short-lived military guild charged with the defence of the Pale. He served as High Sheriff of Meath in 1482.

So long as the House of York held power he appears to have been a loyal enough Yorkist; he was at Court in 1479, and in 1484 received a letter from Richard III thanking him for his services. After the downfall of the Yorkist dynasty, and its replacement by the Tudor dynasty, the new King Henry VII trusted him enough to make him Lord Chancellor; this was apparently in an effort to curb the power of the Kildare faction, with whom Plunket had quarrelled.

He left office in 1494 and died in 1503. His estates passed to his eldest son Sir Christopher Plunket, and on Christopher's death without issue to his next surviving son Edward.
