= John Thomas Barnewall, 15th Baron Trimlestown =

Irish peer (1773–1839)

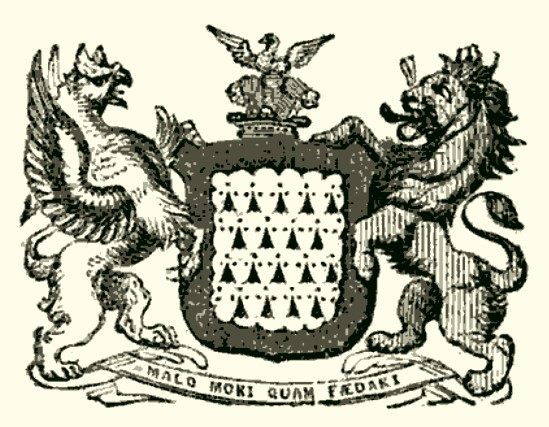
Barnewall, Barons Trimlestown crest.

John Thomas Barnewall, 15th Baron Trimlestown (30 January 1773 – 7 October 1839) was an Irish landowner associated with the Roebuck Estate in County Dublin, Ireland. He succeeded to the title on the death of his father Nicholas on 16 April 1813. His mother was his father's first wife Martha Henrietta d'Aguin, daughter of Joseph d'Aguin. He married Maria Kirwan, daughter of Richard Kirwan of County Galway and Anne Blake, and had two children. He died in Naples.

== See also ==
- Baron Trimlestown

Peerage of Ireland
Preceded by Nicholas Barnewall	Baron Trimlestown; 1773–1839	Succeeded by Thomas Barnewall
