= Matthias Barnewall, 10th Baron Trimlestown =

Irish Jacobite peer and soldier

Matthias Barnewall, 10th Baron Trimlestown (1670 – 8 September 1692) was an Irish Jacobite peer and soldier.

== Biography ==
He was the son of Robert Barnewall, 9th Baron Trimlestown and Margaret Dungan, and was educated in France. In June 1689 he succeeded to his father's title and was one of the Roman Catholic peers who attended the Irish House of Lords in the Patriot Parliament of 1689. Trimlestown participated in the Williamite War in Ireland on the side of James II of England. In 1689 he was a Captain in Viscount Galmoye's regiment and in 1690 he was a Colonel in a Jacobite regiment of foot.

Trimlestown was a hostage of the Treaty of Limerick. He was outlawed by the treaty, had his estates seized and joined the Flight of the Wild Geese to France. He was appointed a Lieutenant in the Duke of Berwick's 1st Horse Guards in French service, and died at the age of 22 in a cavalry charge at the Battle of Ortheuville (Roumont) on 8 September 1692.

He never married and was succeeded in his title by his younger brother, John, who petitioned successfully to recover his family's confiscated Irish estates from Henry Sydney, 1st Earl of Romney.

Peerage of Ireland
Preceded by Robert Barnewall	Baron Trimlestown; 1689–1692 (Attainted 1691)	Succeeded by John Barnewall
