= Thomas Barnewall, 16th Baron Trimlestown =

Irish landowner

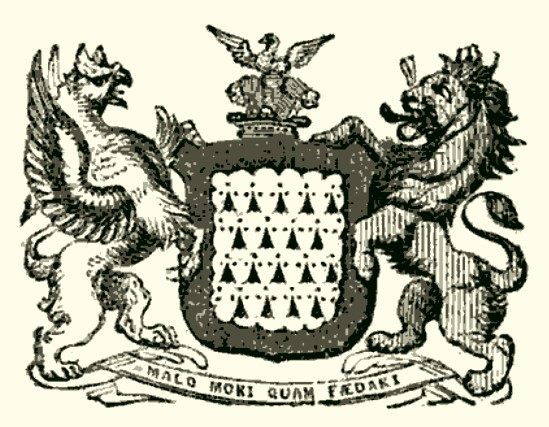
Barnewall, Barons Trimlestown crest.

Thomas Barnewall, 16th Baron Trimlestown (1796 – 1879) was an Irish landowner associated with the Roebuck Estate in County Dublin, Ireland.

He was educated at Trinity College, Dublin. He succeeded to the title on the death of his father John Thomas Barnewall, 15th Baron Trimlestown on 7 October 1839. His mother was Maria Kirwan of County Galway. He married Margaret Roche, daughter of Philip Roche of Donore, County Meath and Anne Plunkett. They had one surviving daughter, but their only son died in infancy. On Thomas' death, the title went into abeyance. In 1893 a distant cousin successfully made out his claim to it.

== See also ==
- Baron Trimlestown

Peerage of Ireland
| Preceded by John Thomas Barnewall | Baron Trimlestown; 1839–1879 | Succeeded by Christopher Barnewall |
