= Richard Jennings (politician) =

English nobleman and politician

Sir Richard Jennings MP
- Born: c. 1619
- Died: 8 May 1668
- Occupation: Politician
- Title: Sir
- Spouse: Frances Thornhurst
- Children: Sarah Churchill, Duchess of Marlborough; Frances Talbot, Countess of Tyrconnell
- Parent(s): Sir John Jennings; Alice Spencer

Sir Richard Jennings MP (c. 1619 – 8 May 1668) was an English nobleman and politician who sat in the House of Commons at various times between 1642 and 1668. He took the Parliamentary side in the Civil War. He was the father of Sarah Churchill, Duchess of Marlborough, who was the confidante of Queen Anne.

In August 1642, Jennings succeeded his father Sir John Jennings as head of the family, and took up residence at Sandridge in Hertfordshire. He was also elected as Member of Parliament (MP) for St Albans in 1642 in succession to his father. Richard's mother – who bore his father no fewer than 22 children – was Alice, daughter of Sir Richard Spencer of Offley.

Jennings fought for the parliamentary cause in the Civil War, and was captured by the Royalists and imprisoned for some time. As a moderate, he was secluded from parliament under Pride's Purge in December 1648. He was re-elected MP for St Albans in Richard Cromwell's Third Protectorate Parliament in 1659. He took a leading role in the restored Long Parliament during the few weeks of 1660 when the secluded members resumed their seats, and was then elected MP for St Albans for the Convention Parliament. He was re-elected MP for St Albans in 1661 for the Cavalier Parliament and sat until his death in 1668.

Jennings married Frances Thornhurst, daughter and heiress of Sir Gifford Thornhurst, 1st Baronet, and Susanna Temple. She brought with her the manor of Agney, Kent. Their daughters, Sarah and Frances, were both noteworthy figures at the court of Charles II. Frances, nicknamed "La Belle Jennings", became maid of honour to the Duchess of York in 1664, and eventually by her second marriage to Richard Talbot became Countess of Tyrconnel. Sarah married John Churchill, the future Duke of Marlborough, in 1677, and was highly influential during the reign of Queen Anne. Abigail Masham, who ultimately supplanted her as the Queen's confidante, was a first cousin of Sarah, the child of Elizabeth Jennings Hill, one of Richard's 21 siblings.

Jennings' estates, initially divided between his two daughters, were later consolidated by Sarah's husband.

Parliament of England
Preceded by Edward Wingate; Sir John Jennings	Member of Parliament for St Albans; 1642–1648; With: Edward Wingate	Succeeded by Both seats vacant after Pride's Purge
Preceded by Alban Cox	Member of Parliament for St Albans; January–May 1659; With: Alban Cox	Succeeded by Both seats vacant in the restored Rump
Preceded by Both seats vacant in the restored Rump	Member of Parliament for St Albans; 1660–1668; With: Edward Wingate 1660; William Foxwist 1660–1661; Thomas Arris 1661–1668	Succeeded by Thomas Arris; Samuel Grimston
