= Nicholas Barnewall (Irish judge) =

Irish judge and landowner

Sir Nicholas Barnewall (died after 1465) was an Irish judge and landowner of the fifteenth century who held office as Lord Chief Justice of Ireland. He was the ancestor of the Barnewall Baronets of Crickstown.

He was born at Crickstown, County Meath, the eldest son of Sir Christopher Bernevall (died 1446) and his wife Matilda (or Maud) Drake (died before 1424), an heiress of the wealthy Drake family of Drakerath. She was a close relative, possibly a sister, of John Drake, who was three times Lord Mayor of Dublin in the early 1400s, and led the citizens of Dublin to a decisive victory over the O'Byrne clan of County Wicklow at the Battle of Bloody Bank on the River Dargle in 1402.

Nicholas's father was Lord Chief Justice of Ireland for more than a decade. Nicholas was "bred up to the law", and was appointed to the same office as his father in 1457, with a knighthood. In 1461 he was superseded in favour of Sir Thomas Fitz-Christopher Plunket, but regained office later the same year. He retired about 1463, and was still alive in 1465.

He married Ismay, daughter and co-heiress of Sir Robert Serjeant of Castleknock, County Dublin: they had at least two sons, Christopher and Edmund. Ismay's sister Joan married Sir Jenico d'Artois the younger, eldest son of the soldier and statesman Sir Jenico d'Artois and his first wife Joan Taaffe of Liscarton Castle, County Meath. There was a bitter dispute over the family inheritance between the two sisters and their respective husbands, from which the Barnewalls emerged the winners, acquiring far more than the half share of the estate to which Ismay was entitled by law.

Christopher, Nicholas's eldest son, inherited Crickstown, where the Barnewall family remained for several generations. He married Ellen Butler, daughter of Edmund Butler, 8th Baron Dunboyne. In 1623 his descendant Sir Patrick Barnewall was conferred with a baronetcy in 1623, which still exists.

Ismay outlived her husband, and remarried the prominent Yorkist nobleman Sir Robert Bold, 1st and last Baron Ratoath, who died in 1479. Catherine Bold, Lord Ratoath's daughter and heiress by his previous marriage, married Nicholas and Ismay's younger son Edmund Barnewall: they settled at Dunbrow in County Dublin, where their descendants remained for several generations.

Nicholas's younger brother Robert was created the first Baron Trimleston in 1461.

Legal offices
Preceded by Sir James Alleyn	Lord Chief Justice of Ireland; 1457–1461	Succeeded by Sir Thomas Fitz-Christopher Plunket
Preceded by Sir Thomas Fitz-Christopher Plunket	Lord Chief Justice of Ireland; 1461–1463 or before	Succeeded by Sir Thomas Fitz-Christopher Plunket
