= Edward Wingate =

Edward Wingate (c. 1606 – August 1685) was an English politician who sat in the House of Commons from 1640 to 1648. He supported the Parliamentary cause in the English Civil War.

Wingate was the son of Edward Wingate, of Harlington, Bedfordshire, and of Lockleys, Hertfordshire. He matriculated at Trinity College, Cambridge at Easter 1623 and was admitted at Gray's Inn on 17 November 1626.

In November 1640, Wingate was elected member of parliament for St Albans in the Long Parliament. He sat until 1648 when he was excluded under Pride's Purge.

Wingate was of Lockleys, Hertfordshire. He died at the age of 79 and was buried at Welwyn, Hertfordshire on 10 August 1685. He had married Mary Allway, daughter of Ralph Allway, of Canons-in-Shenley, Hertfordshire. He was succeeded by his son Edward.

Parliament of England
| Preceded by John Jennings; Richard Coningsby | Member of Parliament for St Albans; 1640–1648; With: John Jennings 1640–1642; Richard Jennings 1645–1648 | Succeeded by Not represented in Rump Parliament |
