= Robert Barnewall =

Anglo-Irish landowner

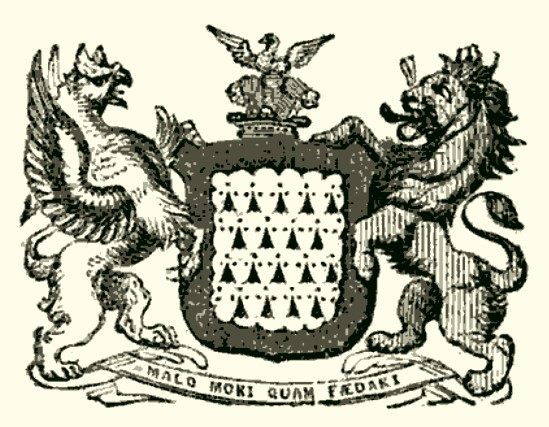
Barnewall, Barons Trimlestown crest.

Robert Barnewall, 12th Baron Trimlestown (c.1704 – 6 December 1779) was a prominent Anglo-Irish landowner, active in the Roman Catholic cause.

== Early life ==
Robert was the eldest son of John Barnewall, 11th Baron Trimlestown (1672–1746). Robert's mother, John's wife and cousin, was Mary or Margaret Barnewall (died 1771), daughter of Sir John Barnewall, Recorder of Dublin and Thomasine Preston, daughter of Viscount Tara. Robert had two surviving younger brothers, including the short-lived soldier Anthony Barnewall, all three being educated privately. Robert travelled abroad extensively in his youth, studying botany and medicine.

== Return to Ireland ==
Barnewall returned home to Trimlestown Castle in Ireland in 1746 when he inherited his title and quickly became known for his stylish living and hospitality, extending generous help to local poor people.

By 1746, Catholics in Ireland were wholly disenfranchised by a series of acts of policy of the British government (see Ireland 1691–1801: The Penal Laws). Barnewall saw himself as an inheritor of the Hiberno-Norman establishment but, by the mid 18th century, agitation in the Catholic cause had shifted from the gentry to the rising merchant and professional classes. Thus, in 1759, Barnewall split with the mercantile Catholics and mounted his own reform campaign but with little initial success. An offer that Catholics enlist in the armed forces was rebuffed in 1762, a humiliation compounded when his son Thomas converted to Protestantism.

Barnewall's return to politics in 1775 was marked by a more conciliatory approach to his fellow Catholics and he was crucial to a successful project to develop an oath of allegiance acceptable to the Catholic laity. Barnewall soon assumed the authority to speak for the entire Irish Catholic cause, including the Catholic Committee.

With the British government engaged in the American Revolutionary War, Barnewall renewed his earlier offer of enlistment. The renewed offer was timely. The British government's Quebec Act of 1774, which had granted concessions to Catholics in Quebec, had been condemned by the revolutionaries, and the Irish Catholic community was experiencing a wave of pro-British establishment enthusiasm. However, such patriotic fervour itself roused Protestant hostility in Dublin. Barnewall's intervention to moderate Catholic passion was admired both by the British government and his Catholic following.

His health deteriorating, his final political act was to head the list of signatories to the Catholic address of loyalty to the new Lord Lieutenant of Ireland John Hobart, 2nd Earl of Buckinghamshire in 1777. Barnewall died in Dublin and was buried at Trimlestown.

== Personal life ==
He married three times:

1. Margaret (died c.1740), daughter of James Rochfort of Laragh, County Kildare;
2. Elizabeth, daughter of John Colt of Brightlingsea and his wife Elizabeth Man (in or before 1757); and
3. Anne (died 1831), the fifth daughter of William Hervey of London and his wife Elizabeth Barfoot.

He appears to have had at least four sons, though two died very young. Two surviving sons, Thomas, and Mathias, adhered to the Anglican Church of Ireland. He had at least one daughter Bridget, who married Robert Martin FitzAnthony: they were the parents of the well-known politician Richard Martin ("Humanity Dick").

== See also ==
- Baron Trimlestown

== Bibliography ==
- O'Brien, G. (2004) "Barnewall, Robert, styled twelfth Baron Trimleston (c. 1704–1779)", Oxford Dictionary of National Biography, Oxford University Press, Retrieved 9 August 2007 (subscription or UK public library membership required)

Peerage of Ireland
Preceded by John Barnewall	Baron Trimlestown; 1746–1779	Succeeded by Thomas Barnewall
