= Donaghpatrick =

Village in County Meath, Ireland

Coordinates: 53°41′N 6°45′W

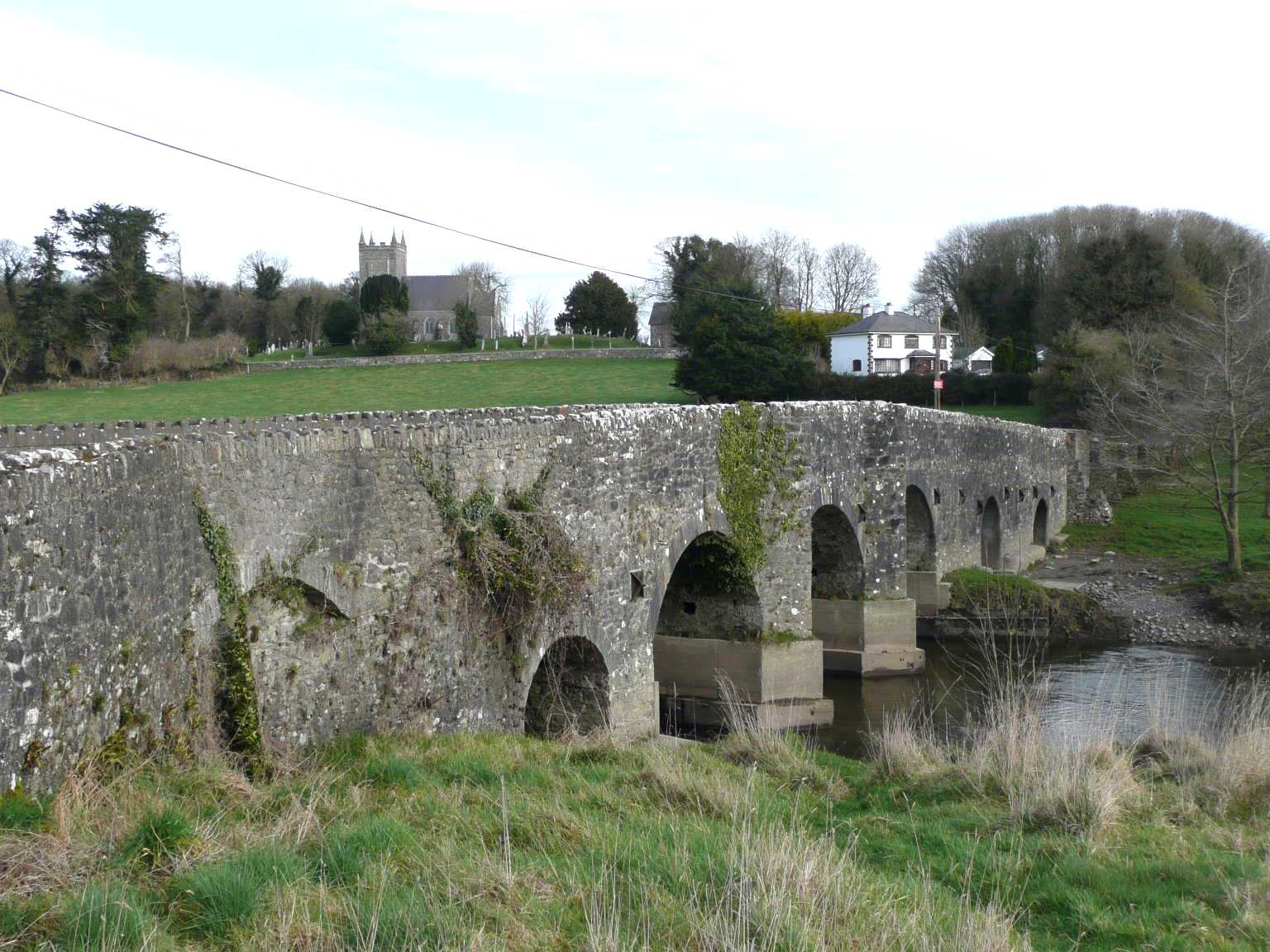
Donaghpatrick Bridge

Donaghpatrick (Irish: Domhnach Phádraig, meaning 'the church of Patrick') is a village and townland in County Meath, Ireland. It lies approximately 5 km northwest of Navan off the R147 regional road between Navan and Kells on the northern bank of the River Blackwater. The Irish language name of the townland, Domhnach Phádraig, means "the church of Patrick". The local Church of Ireland church, dedicated to Saint Patrick, was built in 1896 close to the site of a much earlier church, and incorporating parts of a medieval tower house. The village is in a civil parish of the same name.

The Cruys family from County Dublin owned the manor in medieval times. The inquisition taken after the death of Sir John Cruys of Merrion Castle in 1407 lists Donaghpatrick as one of his estates.
