= Anthony Barnewall =

Anthony Barnewall (1721–1739), was an officer in the Austrian army.

Barnewall was the sixth and youngest son of John, eleventh Baron Trimleston, by his wife and cousin Mary (or Margaret), daughter of Sir John Barnewall. At the age of seventeen, he served in Germany with General Hamilton's regiment of cuirassiers. "His good sense, humility, good nature, and truly honest worthy principles, gained him the love and esteem of all who had the least acquaintance with him" (letter to his brother-in-law Viscount Mountgarret from a general in the imperial service, 1739). There was scarcely an action of any note with the Turks that he was not in, and he always acquitted himself with uncommon resolution. He fell a victim to his headlong bravery in the stubborn battle of Krotzka (September 1739), when the Austrians were defeated by the Turks. Young Barnewall had been promoted to the rank of lieutenant only the day before. His regiment was one of the first that charged the enemy, and, the captain and cornet being killed at the first onset, the lieutenant took up the standard, tore off the flag, tied it round his waist, and led the troop to the charge. Twice he was repulsed, when, turning to his men with the words, "Come on, my brave fellows! We shall certainly do the work now", for the third time he spurred his horse into the thickest of the enemy, where, being surrounded, he fell, covered with wounds.
