= Nicholas Barnewall, 14th Baron Trimlestown =

Irish landowner

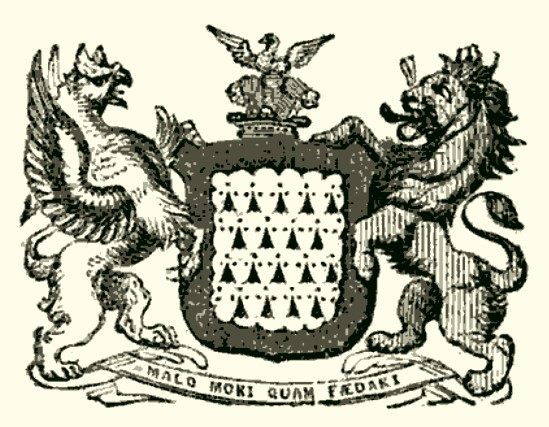
Barnewall, Barons Trimlestown crest.

Nicholas Barnewall, 14th Baron Trimlestown (8 June 1726 – 16 April 1813) was an Irish landowner associated with the Roebuck Estate in County Dublin, Ireland. He was the son of Richard Barnewall, a younger brother of Robert Barnewall, 12th Baron Trimlestown, and his wife and distant cousin Frances Barnewall, daughter of Nicholas Barnewall, 3rd Viscount Barnewall and Mary Hamilton. He succeeded to his title on the death of his cousin Thomas in 1796.

His first wife was Martha Henrietta, only daughter of Joseph d'Aguin, president of the Parlement of Toulouse in the Kingdom of France, by whom he had three children: Richard, who died young, John Thomas, who succeeded to the title, and Rosalie, who married Peter, Count D'Alton, of Grenanstown, County Tipperary and had issue.

His second wife was Alicia Eustace, daughter of General Charles Eustace and Alice McAusland, who outlived him by many years. She remarried General Sir Evan Lloyd and had issue by her second marriage, including Louisa-Anne, who married Sir Willoughby Dixie, 8th Baronet of the Dixie Baronets.

== See also ==
- Baron Trimlestown

Peerage of Ireland
Preceded by Thomas Barnewall	Baron Trimlestown; 1726–1813	Succeeded by John Thomas Barnewall
