= Roebuck, Dublin =

Townland and castle in south County Dublin, Ireland

Roebuck Reabóg (Irish)
- Townland
- Location in Dublin
- Coordinates: 53°18′14″N 6°13′47″W
- Country: Ireland
- Province: Leinster
- County: County Dublin
- Local authority: Dún Laoghaire-Rathdown County Council

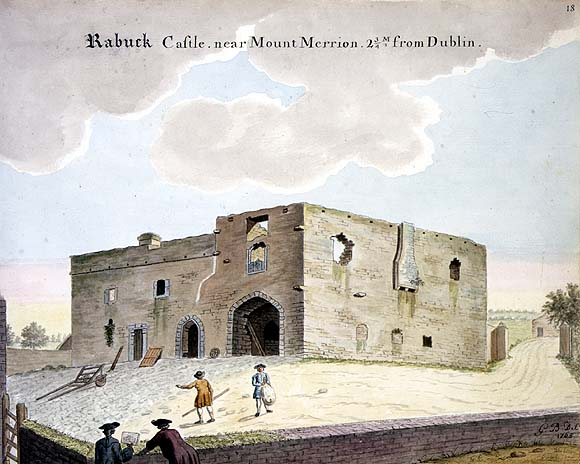
Ruins of Roebuck Castle by Gabriel Beranger, 1765.

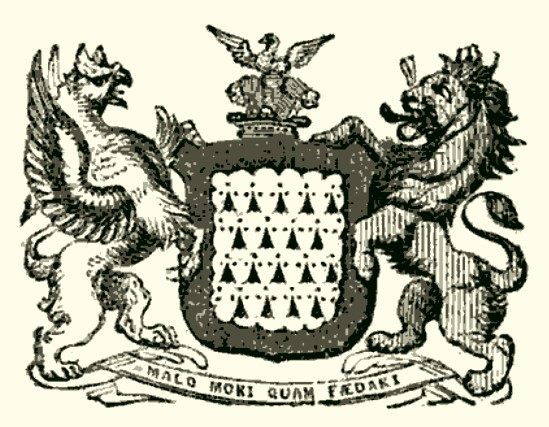
Barnewall, Barons Trimlestown, crest.

Roebuck (Irish: Reabóg), also originally known as "Rabuck", is a townland and the name of a former estate in the baronies of Dublin and Rathdown in Ireland.

The townland incorporates roughly all the land in the triangle between Clonskeagh, Dundrum and Mount Merrion. Historically significant buildings which exist (or existed) in the area include Mountainville House, Mount Anville, St. Thomas's Church, Moorfield, Mount Dillon, Castleview, Owenstown House, Roebuck Hill, Hermitage House, Friarsland House, Prospect Hall, Roebuck Lodge, Bellefield, Roebuck Park, Belfield House and Harlech House.

Roebuck became established as a location shortly after the Norman invasion of Ireland (from 1169). In the 13th century, the area was owned by Fromund Le Brun, the Lord Chancellor of Ireland.

== Castle ==
In 1261, the area around Roebuck was owned by Fromund Le Brun, the Lord Chancellor of Ireland, and a castle was built there in the 13th century. In 1466, his descendant Elizabeth le Brun married Robert Barnewall, 1st Baron Trimlestown.

In 1509, the 3rd Baron Trimlestown who was later to become Lord Chancellor of Ireland, is recorded as living at the castle.

The origins of the modern castle are said to have been in the building of a castle by Robert Barnewall, 5th Baron Trimlestown sometime in the 16th century.

The castle was badly damaged in the Irish Rebellion of 1641.

The Civil Survey of 1654-56 noted that the lands of 'Rabuck' extended to 500 acres.

It was pictured in a ruinous condition by Gabriel Beranger around 1768. Writing in 1781, the antiquarian Austin Cooper describes a large L-shaped castle with an inscribed stone in a window of the north west angle which featured the arms of the Trimblestown family.

=== Later rebuilding ===
==== Georgian remodelling ====
The main 16th century castellated house was substantially remodelled for the 13th Baron Trimlestown between 1788–94, to a design by the architect Samuel Sproule. Some of the plastering of the new house was completed by the stuccodore Vincent Waldré.

It was sold by the 14th Baron Trimlestown to James Crofton, an official of the Irish Treasury, in around 1800.

==== Other Georgian House ====
The surgeon Solomon Richards also acquired land in the area of the estate known later from 1856 as Roebuck Grove or Whiteoaks from Baron Trimlestown in 1812 and the Georgian house was later occupied by his eldest son John Goddard Richards. It appears that Michael Stapleton may have been involved in some of the interior stucco work. This Georgian house was demolished by UCD in 1980. It was also sometimes called Grove House.

==== Victorian remodelling ====
The estate was acquired by the Westby family in 1856 who further developed the current castle building in what was then a fashionable neo-gothic style. In the 1870s Edward Perceval Westby is recorded as owning 67 acres in the area. He was High Sheriff of Clare in 1854. The three-storey Victorian Gothic porch with a battlemented gable was added around 1874 while there was said to have been a greenhouse added by Richard Turner at some stage in the 19th century.

Francis Vandeleur Westby died on 19 September 1930 while his wife Louie died later at the house on 27 May 1943.

The house was then sold at auction by Alan & Townsend and was acquired by the Little Sisters of the Poor, who owned the building until the 1980s.

In 1985, the Sisters sold 10 acres around the castle to UCD for £800,000. Later in 1986, UCD acquired the castle building and 10 acres for £620,000 and it was adapted for teaching.

The building was used by the school of law until 2013, when a new dedicated Sutherland School of Law building was constructed closer to the main campus.

==== Later research ====
In September 2026, research by University College Dublin architectural historian Tadhg O'Keeffe suggested that parts of the original medieval Roebuck Castle survive within the Victorian building. Previously believed to have been demolished during the 19th-century redevelopment, parts of the 13th-century castle were instead incorporated into the later structure, with its walls and architectural features concealed beneath plaster and its original courtyard still identifiable behind the house.

== See also ==
- Baron Trimlestown
- Nixon baronets
