= John Barnewall, 3rd Baron Trimlestown =

Irish nobleman, judge and politician

John Barnewall, 3rd Baron Trimleston (1470-25 July 1538), was an Irish nobleman, judge and politician. He was the eldest son of Christopher Barnewall, 2nd Baron Trimlestown and his wife Elizabeth Plunket, daughter of Sir Thomas Fitz-Christopher Plunket of Rathmore, Lord Chief Justice of the King's Bench in Ireland and his second wife Marian Cruise (or Cruys). He succeeded his father as 3rd Baron in about 1513. His father, like most of the Anglo-Irish aristocracy, had supported the claim of the pretender Lambert Simnel to the English throne in 1487. After the failure of Simnel's rebellion, he received a royal pardon.

His ancestors came to Ireland originally with Henry II and received large grants of land in County Cork. However, at the first favourable opportunity the old proprietors, the O'Sullivans, rose and murdered the whole family save one young man, who was absent studying law in England. He ultimately returned to Ireland and settled at Drimnagh, near Dublin.

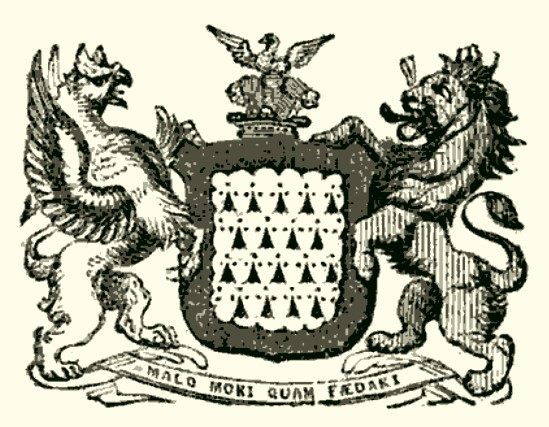
Barnewall, Barons Trimlestown family crest

== Biography ==
The subject of our sketch rose to high office in Ireland under Henry VIII; he was knighted around 1513, and received grants of land near Dunleer. He also owned Roebuck Castle, in south County Dublin (now a part of the campus of University College Dublin), which came into the Barnewall family through his grandfather's marriage to Elizabeth le Brun, daughter and heiress of Christopher le Brun, in 1466.

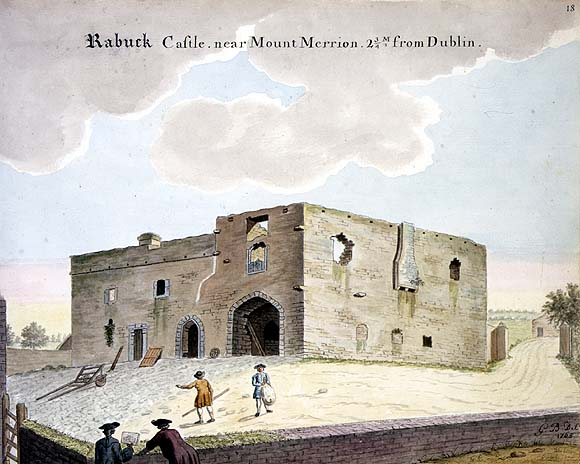
Ruins of Roebuck Castle, by Gabriel Berange, c,1765: Lord Trimlestown's grandfather had acquired Roebuck Castle by marriage

He was unusual among the Irish nobility of his time both in his legal ability and in his willingness to hold judicial office. O'Flanagan suggests that in becoming a judge he wished to follow the distinguished example of his maternal grandfather, Chief Justice Plunket. He was made Attorney General for Ireland in 1504, Solicitor General for Ireland and King's Sergeant shortly after, second justice of the Court of King's Bench in 1514, Deputy Treasurer and then Lord Treasurer of Ireland in 1524 and Lord Chancellor of Ireland in 1534. The King wrote that he was content that his "trusty and well-beloved counsellor Lord Trimlestown should continue in office as Lord Chancellor". He was sworn a member of the Privy Council of Ireland in 1521, and was a supporter of Gerald FitzGerald, 9th Earl of Kildare, whose family still for a few more years retained their 50-year dominance of Irish political life. His record of loyalty to the FitzGeralds led to trouble for Trimlestown in the next decade when Gerald's son Silken Thomas rebelled against the Crown. O'Flanagan praises him as an expert on finance as well as law, but adds somewhat cynically that his greatest talent was for looking after his own interests, as evidenced by the substantial grants of lands at Dunleer made to him by the English Crown.

In 1536, under the command of the Lord Treasurer, Sir William Brabazon, he made an incursion into Offaly, and drove back the O'Conor clan, who were then ravaging the Anglo-Irish settlements. The next year, commissioned by the Privy Council of Ireland, he negotiated successfully with the O'Neills. During the Rebellion of Silken Thomas, 10th Earl of Kildare, he was one of the Irish nobles whose loyalty to the Crown was considered to be dubious, but it seems that these suspicions, based on John's record of support for the Kildare dynasty, were not strong enough for any action to be taken against him. After the failure of the Rebellion, he received a royal pardon, like most of those who had been suspected of, but not proven, to have supported it.

He died on 25 July 1538.

== Family ==
He was four times married. Only the names of his first and second wives are known for certain: they were Janet (or Genet) Bellew, daughter of John Bellew of Bellewstown, County Meath, and Margaret, daughter of Patrick FitzLeones, who was three times Lord Mayor of Dublin between 1477 and 1495; her mother was a member of the influential FitzEustace family of County Kildare. He had seven children. By Janet, he had a son and heir:

- Patrick Barnewall, 4th Baron Trimlestown.

By Margaret, he had six further children, four sons and two daughters:

- Sir Thomas Barnewall.
- Peter Barnewall.
- James Barnewall.
- Andrew Barnewall.
- Elizabeth Barnewall, who married three times: her husbands were George Plunkett of Beaulieu, County Louth, nephew of Oliver Plunkett, 1st Baron Louth, Christopher Eustace and William Darcy of Platten.
- Catherine Barnewall, who married Patrick Hussey, 11th Baron Galtrim, and had four children, including James Hussey, 12th Baron Galtrim, and Mary, who married George Aylmer, ancestor of the Aylmer baronets of Donadea.

His brother Robert (died before 1547), of Rosestown, County Meath, was like John a barrister of Gray's Inn, and was also recommended for appointment as King's Serjeant-at-law, or as Chief Baron of the Irish Exchequer in 1537, but was not appointed to either office. He acquired Rosestown through marriage to the heiress Joanna Rowe. Patrick Barnewall, Solicitor General for Ireland and Master of the Rolls in Ireland, was the nephew of John and Robert, the son of their sister Alison who married their cousin Roger Barnewall of Kingsland.

Peerage of Ireland
Preceded by Christopher Barnewall	Baron Trimlestown c. 1513–1538	Succeeded by Patrick Barnewall
