= Joseph d'Aguin =

Jean-Joseph d'Aguin (March 1731 - June 14, 1794) was president of the Parlement of Toulouse in the Kingdom of France. D'Aguin was born in Toulouse in March 1731, and became president of the second Chambre des Enquêtes in May 1761. He was executed on June 14, 1794.

== Family ==
He married Thérèse-Rosalie de Resseguier. His sister Martha Henrietta was the first wife of Nicholas Barnewall, 14th Baron Trimlestown of Ireland, and mother of his only surviving son and heir.
