= John Jennings (St Albans MP) =

English aristocrat and politician

Sir John Jennings KB
- Died: August 1642
- Occupation: Politician
- Title: Sir
- Spouse: Alice Spencer
- Children: 22 (including Sir Richard Jennings)
- Parents: Sir John Jennings (father); Anne Brouncker (mother)

Sir John Jennings KB (died August 1642) of Halywell (later Holywell) House, St Albans, was an English aristocrat and politician who sat in the House of Commons at various times between 1628 and 1642. He is now chiefly remembered as the grandfather of Sarah Churchill, Duchess of Marlborough, and of her nemesis Abigail Masham. He is also notable for the extraordinary number of children (22) whom he fathered, all from one marriage.

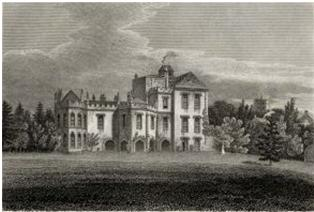
Halywell (or Holywell House), St Albans. Now demolished.

== Life ==
He succeeded his father, another Sir John Jennings, as head of the family in 1609; his father is said to have become insane some years before his death. He was High Sheriff of Hertfordshire in 1626 and was created Knight of the Bath in the same year. In 1628 he was elected Member of Parliament for St Albans and sat until 1629, when King Charles decided to rule without parliament for eleven years.

Jennings was re-elected MP for St Albans in April 1640 for the Short Parliament and again in November 1640 for the Long Parliament. He was a sympathiser with the Parliamentary cause, but died before the outbreak of the English Civil War.

John Jennings was married to Alice, daughter of Sir Richard Spencer of Offley and Helen Brocket, and they had 22 children, many of whom survived infancy. His will names only three of his children: Richard, Alice and Robert. His wife's will names four more children: Ralph, George, Elizabeth (who married Francis Hill), and Grace. Lady Jennings died in 1663.

Jennings's eldest son Richard succeeded him as MP for St Albans. Richard's daughter Sarah married the 1st Duke of Marlborough and was the confidante of Queen Anne. She was in time supplanted in the Queen's affections by her cousin Abigail Masham, who was another of John Jennings's grandchildren through her mother Elizabeth Hill.

Sarah later wrote in her Memoirs that she had not known of Abigail's existence until they were both well into adult life, because there were so many descendants of her grandfather. On learning of Abigail's relationship with her and of her poverty-stricken state as a servant, Sarah took her (and her sister Alice) into her own household, ultimately with disastrous political results for herself and her husband.

== Sources ==
- D Brunton & D H Pennington, Members of the Long Parliament (London: George Allen & Unwin, 1954)

Parliament of England
Preceded by Sir Charles Morrison, 1st Baronet; Sir Edward Goring	Member of Parliament for St Albans; 1628–1629; With: Robert Kirkham	Parliament suspended until 1640
Vacant Parliament suspended since 1629	Member of Parliament for St Albans; 1640–1642; With: Richard Coningsby 1640; Edward Wingate	Succeeded by Richard Jennings; Edward Wingate
