= Gabriel Beranger =

Dutch artist operating in Ireland (1725–1817)

Gabriel Beranger (1725–1817) was a Dutch artist, known for his works showing Irish antiquities.

== Life ==
Beranger was born in Rotterdam on 9 March 1725, as the son of Henry Beranger and Marie le Duc/Anne Marie Leduc. His parents, who had married in Rotterdam in 1713, were both of Huguenot origin. In 1760, Beranger went to Ireland to join family members there.

Beranger opened a print shop and artist's warehouse at 5 South Great George's Street, Dublin, and followed the profession of an artist. Charles Vallancey and William Conyngham became his patrons and found him a government situation in the Dublin exchequer office.

In later life Beranger was financially independent, after a bequest from his brother-in-law. He died at the age of 91 or 92, and was interred in the French burial-ground in Dublin.

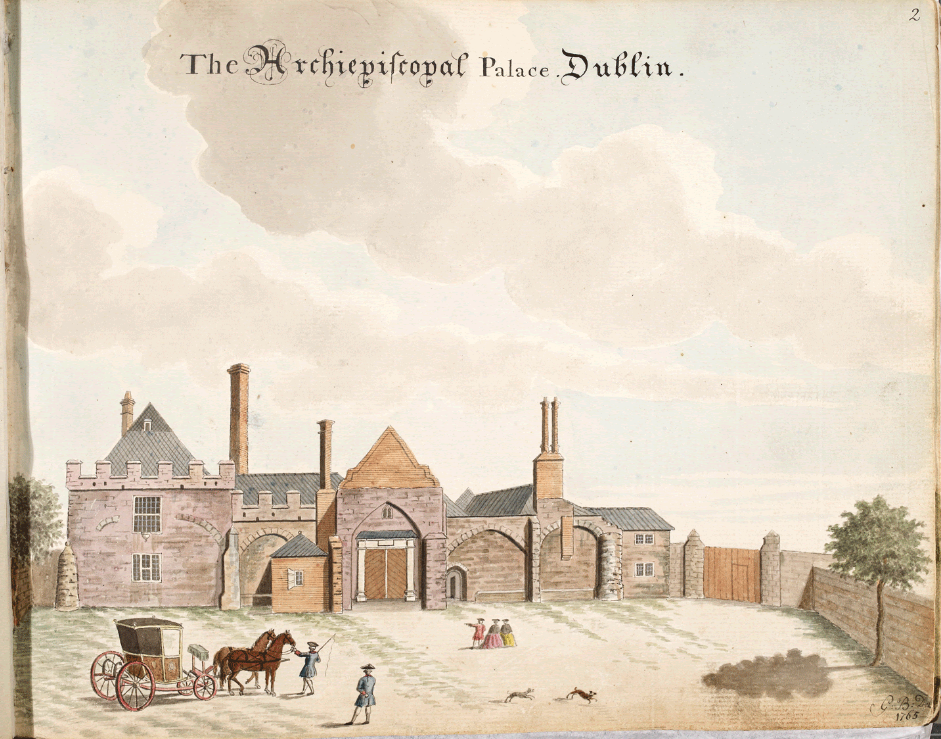
Archbishop's Palace Dublin (1765), watercolour by Gabriel Beranger

In 2023, a block of apartments in the Clonskeagh area of South County Dublin near Roebuck Castle was named Beranger House in honour of the artist.

== Works ==
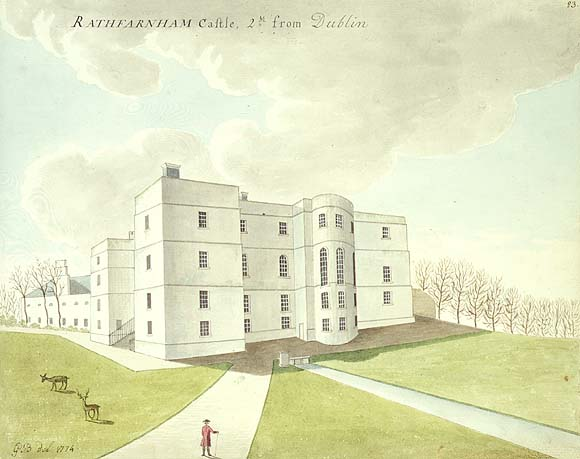
Rathfarnham Castle (1774), watercolour by Gabriel Beranger

Beranger drew the antiquities of Dublin and its neighbourhood, and then, with the French artist Angelo Bigari, sketching tours through Leinster, Connaught, and Ulster. Many of his drawings are accompanied by descriptions of the places and people he visited. He transferred his drawings and descriptions to manuscript volumes intended for publication, most of which were kept in Dublin, in the Royal Irish Academy and elsewhere. The drawings give the appearance of ancient buildings and stone monuments that later deteriorated or were destroyed. George Petrie made use of these drawings to illustrate his book on the round towers of Ireland.

== Notes ==
Attribution

This article incorporates text from a publication now in the public domain: Stephen, Leslie, ed. (1885). "Beranger, Gabriel". Dictionary of National Biography. Vol. 4. London: Smith, Elder & Co.
