= Nicholas Barnewall, 3rd Viscount Barnewall =

Irish viscount (1668–1725)

Nicholas Barnewall
- Viscount Barnewall
- Tenure: 1688–1725
- Predecessor: Henry Barnewall, 2nd Viscount Barnewall
- Successor: Henry Benedict Barnewall, 4th Viscount Barnewall
- Born: 15 April 1668
- Died: 14 June 1725 (aged 57)
- Spouse: Mary Hamilton
- Issue Detail: Frances, Henry, & George
- Father: Henry Barnewall, 2nd Viscount Barnewall
- Mother: Mary Nugent

Nicholas Barnewall, 3rd Viscount Barnewall (1668–1725) was an Irish nobleman who fought for the Jacobites but afterwards sat in William's Irish Parliament. He was buried in a beautiful monument at Lusk.

== Birth and origins ==
Nicholas Barnewall was born on 15 April 1668 in Ireland. He was the eldest son of Henry Barnewall and his second wife Mary Nugent. His father had succeeded his grandfather as the 2nd Viscount in 1663. Nicholas's grandfather, also named Nicholas Barnewall, had been ennobled by King Charles I on 12 September 1645 for loyalty to his cause. His mother was a daughter of Richard Nugent, 2nd Earl of Westmeath.

Family tree

Nicholas Barnewall with wife, parents, and other selected relatives. (Note: Also see the lists of siblings and children in the text.)

Nicholas; 1st Viscount; 1592–1663	Bridget; O'Donnell
Mary; Netterville d. 1663	Henry; 2nd Viscount d. 1688	Mary; Nugent; 1648–1680
Nicholas; 3rd Viscount; 1668–1725	Mary; Hamilton; 1676–1736
Henry; 4th Viscount; 1708–1774	Honora; Daly d. 1784	George d. 1771	Barbara; Belasyse
George; 5th Viscount; 1758–1800

Legend

XXX	Subject of the article	XXX	Viscounts; Barnewall

== Marriage and children ==
Before Nicholas was of age, on 15 April 1688, he married Mary Hamilton, daughter of George Hamilton, Comte Hamilton, son of Sir George Hamilton, 1st Baronet, of Donalong, by his wife, Frances Jennings, who afterwards married Richard Talbot, 1st Earl of Tyrconnell).

Nicholas and Mary had three children:

1. Frances (died 1735), who married her distant cousin Richard Barnewall and was the mother of Nicholas Barnewall, 14th Baron Trimlestown
2. Henry Benedict (1708–1774), 4th Viscount Barnewall
3. George (1711–1771), who would be the father of the 5th Viscount

== Career ==
In 1688 he entered King James's Irish army as captain in the Earl of Limerick's Dragoons. After the defeat of the Boyne he was moved to Limerick; and being in that city at the time of its surrender, was included in the articles and secured his estates. In the first Irish Parliament of William III he took the oath of allegiance, but upon declining to subscribe the declaration according to the English Toleration Act 1688, as contrary to his conscience, he was obliged to withdraw with the other Catholic lords. In February 1703, he joined with many Irish Catholics in an unavailing petition against the infraction of the Treaty of Limerick.

== Death ==
Lord Barnewall died 14 June 1725, and was buried in a beautiful monument at Lusk.

== Notes and references ==
=== Sources ===
- Cokayne, George Edward (1910). Gibbs, Vicary (ed.). The complete peerage of England, Scotland, Ireland, Great Britain and the United Kingdom, extant, extinct, or dormant. Vol. I (2nd ed.). London: St Catherine Press. OCLC 228661424. – Ab-Adam to Basing (for Barnewall)
- Webb, Alfred (1878). "Barnewall, Nicholas, Viscount Kingsland". Compendium of Irish Biography. Dublin: M. H. Gill & Son. pp. 9–10. OCLC 122693688.

Peerage of Ireland
Preceded by Henry Barnewall	Viscount Barnewall; 1688–1725	Succeeded by Henry Benedict Barnewall
