= Rathmore Church =

- Cill an Rátha Mhóir
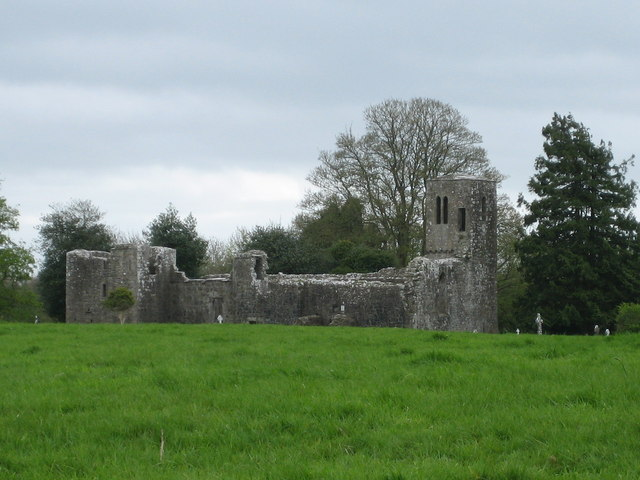

- Location within Ireland
- 53.643173°N 6.872316°W
- Location: Rathmore, Athboy, County Meath
- Country: Ireland
- Denomination: Church of Ireland
- Previous denomination: Pre-Reformation Catholic

History
- Founder: Thomas Fitz-Christopher Plunket
- Dedication: Lorcán Ua Tuathail (St Lawrence)

Architecture
- Heritage designation

National monument of Ireland
- Official name: Rathmore Church
- Reference no.: 289
- Years built: 1470s
- Closed: late 17th century

Specifications
- Length: 26 m (85 ft)
- Width: 7 m (23 ft)
- Materials: sandstone, mortar

Administration
- Diocese: Meath

Rathmore Church is a ruined medieval church and National Monument in County Meath, Ireland. It was constructed by the prominent Plunkett living nearby at Rathmore Castle. A modern church 0.5 km to the northeast serving the area was constructed in 1844. Archer and Smith describe it as similar in purpose to other churches constructed at Killeen and Dunsany.

== Location ==
Rathmore Church is located 3.5 km (2.2 mi) northeast of Athboy, to the west of Jamestown Bog.

== History ==
Thomas Fitz-Christopher Plunket was a lawyer and judge of the mid-15th century, serving as Lord Chief Justice of Ireland in 1461 and 1463. He was married to Marion Cruise (Mary Anne Cruys) and died in 1471; the couple are buried together at Rathmore, Marion's hereditary family seat.

Lieutenant-General Thomas Bligh (d. 1775) of the 20th Regiment of Foot has a monumental tablet in the church. He fought at Dettingen, Val, Fontneay, and Melle. He was also commander of the British troops at Cherbourg.

The baptismal font was stolen in April 2013 but recovered in May of that year.

== Church ==
Rathmore Church is a nave and chancel church with a three-storey sacristy and a tall bell tower. Features include a piscina, sedilia, carved heads and labyrinth stone. The effigy of Thomas Fitz-Christopher Plunket is in good condition; he wears armour and a dog sleeps at his feet. Marion's is badly damaged.
