= Thomas Barnewall, 13th Baron Trimlestown =

Irish noble

Thomas Barnewall, 13th Baron Trimlestown (died 24 December 1796) was an Irish noble. He was the eldest surviving son of Robert Barnewall, 12th Baron Trimlestown and his first wife Margaret Rochfort, daughter of James Rochfort of Laragh. The title was technically under an attainder, which Thomas succeeded in having lifted by conforming openly to the Church of Ireland, a step which his father, a devout Roman Catholic, and a prominent spokesman for the rights of his fellow Catholics, would certainly not have taken. He took his seat in the Irish House of Lords on 13 April 1795. He died unmarried little more than a year later, at which point his title passed to his cousin Nicholas.

== See also ==
- Baron Trimlestown

Peerage of Ireland
Preceded by Robert Barnewall	Baron Trimlestown; 1779–1796	Succeeded by Nicholas Barnewall
