= Baron Trimlestown =

Irish peerage

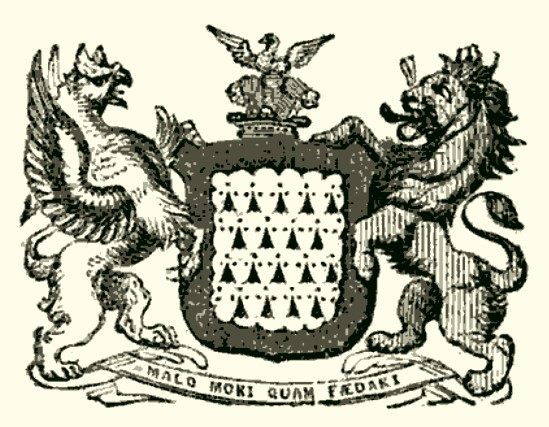
Barnewall, Barons Trimlestown crest.

Baron Trimlestown, of Trimlestown in County Meath, was a title in the Peerage of Ireland. Following the death of the 21st Baron in January 2024 with no known heir, the title is dormant, and may be extinct.

== History ==
The title was created in 1461 for Sir Robert Barnewall, who was the younger brother of Nicholas Barnewall, Chief Justice of the Irish Common Pleas, and younger son of Sir Christopher Bernevall, Lord Chief Justice of the King's Bench in Ireland. He married Elizabeth le Brun, the heiress of Roebuck Castle in South Dublin. He was succeeded by his son Christopher, the second Baron. Christopher was implicated in the Lambert Simnel conspiracy, but received a royal pardon in 1488. His son John, the third Baron, served as Lord Chancellor of Ireland from 1534 until his death in 1538. The tenth baron, Matthias Barnewall, was attainded in 1691 for supporting the Jacobite cause, but his brother successfully recovered the title and family estate.

The barony became dormant on the death of the sixteenth Baron, in 1879. In 1891 the peerage was claimed by Christopher Patrick Mary Barnewall (de jure 17th Baron Trimlestown), a descendant of Hon. Patrick Barnewall, second son of the seventh Baron. He died before he had fully established his claim, but in 1893 his younger brother Charles Aloysius Barnewall was confirmed in the title by the Committee for Privileges of the House of Lords.

As of 2013 the title was held by the grandson of the successful claimant of 1893, the twenty-first Baron, who succeeded his elder brother in 1997. There being no known heir to the barony, on the death of the 21st Baron on 10 January 2024, the title became dormant, and may be extinct, unless a remote heir is found.

== Related titles ==
The Viscounts Barnewall were members of another branch of the Barnewall family and a third branch were the Barnewall baronets of Crickstown.

=== Barons Trimlestown (1461) ===
Barnewall escutcheon

- Robert Barnewall, 1st Baron Trimlestown (died 1470)
- Christopher Barnewall, 2nd Baron Trimlestown (died c. 1513)
- John Barnewall, 3rd Baron Trimlestown (died 1538)
- Patrick Barnewall, 4th Baron Trimlestown (died 1562 or 1563)
- Robert Barnewall, 5th Baron Trimlestown (died 1573)
- Peter Barnewall, 6th Baron Trimlestown (died 1598)
- Robert Barnewall, 7th Baron Trimlestown (c. 1574–1639)
- Matthias Barnewall, 8th Baron Trimlestown (1614–1667)
- Robert Barnewall, 9th Baron Trimlestown (died 1689)
- Matthias Barnewall, 10th Baron Trimlestown (died 1692) (attainted 1691)
- John Barnewall, 11th Baron Trimlestown (1672–1746)
- Robert Barnewall, 12th Baron Trimlestown (died 1779)
- Thomas Barnewall, 13th Baron Trimlestown (died 1796)
- Nicholas Barnewall, 14th Baron Trimlestown (1726–1813)
- John Thomas Barnewall, 15th Baron Trimlestown (1773–1839)
- Thomas Barnewall, 16th Baron Trimlestown (1796–1879) (dormant 1879)
- Christopher Patrick Mary Barnewall, de jure 17th Baron Trimlestown (1846–1891)
- Charles Aloysius Barnewall, 18th Baron Trimlestown (1861–1937) (confirmed in title 1893)
- Charles Aloysius Barnewall, 19th Baron Trimlestown (1899–1990)
- Anthony Edward Barnewall, 20th Baron Trimlestown (1928–1997)
- Raymond Charles Barnewall, 21st Baron Trimlestown (1930–2024)

There is no known heir to the barony.

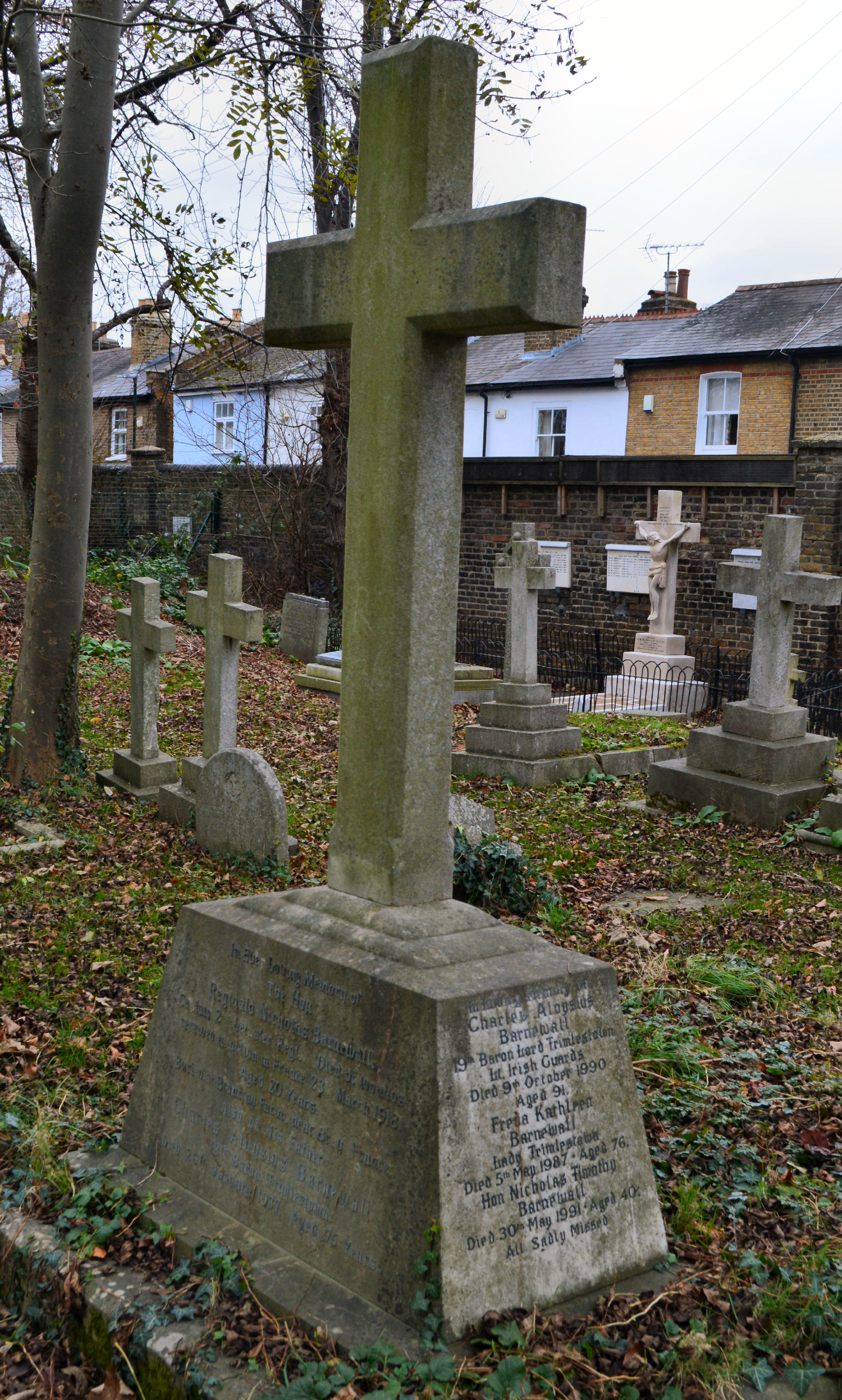
The grave of Charles Aloysius Barnewall, 19th Baron Trimlestown at St Mary Magdalen Roman Catholic Church, Mortlake in December 2021

== See also ==
- Viscount Barnewall
