= Viscount Barnewall =

Viscount Barnewall, of Kingsland in the Parish of Donabate in the County of Dublin, was a title in the Peerage of Ireland. It was created on 29 June 1646 for Nicholas Barnewall, who had earlier represented County Dublin in the Irish House of Commons. The Kingsland Barnewalls were a junior branch of the family of Baron Trimleston; Nicholas's great-grandfather Sir Patrick Barnewall had achieved political eminence largely through his friendship with Thomas Cromwell and had done well out of the Dissolution of the Monasteries. Nicholas was made Baron Turvey at the same time, also in the Peerage of Ireland. His grandson, the third Viscount, was a supporter of James II and was outlawed as a result. However, he was restored to his titles and estates under the Treaty of Limerick. His son, the fourth Viscount, was a Roman Catholic and consequently disqualified from taking his seat in the Irish House of Lords. He was childless and was succeeded by his nephew, the fifth Viscount. He was the son of the Honourable George Barnewall, younger son of the third Viscount. He died unmarried in 1800 when the titles became dormant. They were successfully claimed in 1814 by Matthew Barnewall, who became the sixth Viscount. He was the great-grandson of the Honourable Richard Barnewall, younger son of the first Viscount. However, he had no surviving male issue and on his death in 1834 the titles are considered to have become extinct.

Captain Thomas Barnewall, great-grandson of Colonel James Barnewall, younger son of the first Viscount, claimed the titles but the House of Lords never made a decision on the matter.

The title was occasionally and informally written as "Lord Kingsland".

The family seat was at Turvey House in Donabate, County Dublin.

== Viscounts Barnewall (1646) ==
- Nicholas Barnewall, 1st Viscount Barnewall (1592–1663)
- Henry Barnewall, 2nd Viscount Barnewall (died 1688)
- Nicholas Barnewall, 3rd Viscount Barnewall (1668–1725)
- Henry Benedict Barnewall, 4th Viscount Barnewall (1708–1774)
- George Barnewall, 5th Viscount Barnewall (1758–1800) (dormant 1800)
- Matthew Barnewall, 6th Viscount Barnewall (died 1834) (claim allowed 1814)
