= Barnewall baronets =

Title in the Baronetage of Ireland

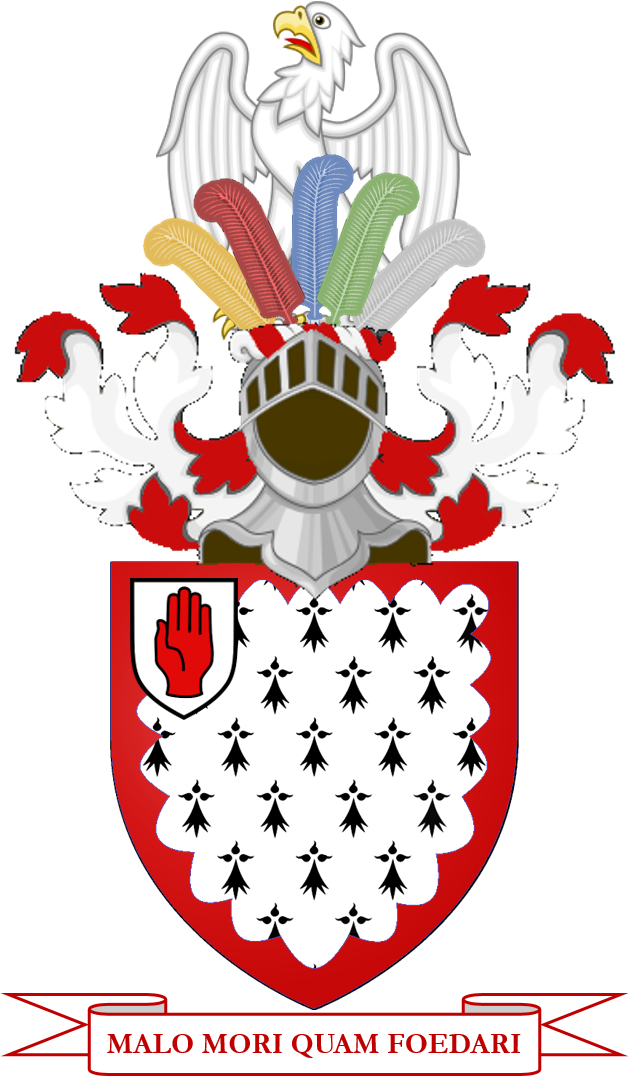
Arms: Ermine a Bordure engrailed Gules; Crest: From a Plume of five Ostrich Feathers Or Gules Azure Vert and Argent a Falcon rising of the last; Motto: Malo mori quam foedari (I prefer to die than be dishonoured)

The Barnewall Baronetcy, of Crickstown Castle in the County of Meath, is a title in the Baronetage of Ireland. It was created on 21 February 1623 for Sir Patrick Barnewall. He was the member of a family that had been settled in Ireland since 1172, when Sir Michael de Berneval landed on the coast of Cork. The second and third Baronets both represented County Meath in the Irish House of Commons. The fifth Baronet, a descendant of the second son the first Baronet, established his right to the title in 1744. However, his cousin Thomas Barnewall, de jure sixth Baronet, never assumed the title and it remained dormant from his death in 1790 until 1821, when it was successfully claimed by Robert Barnewall, the eighth Baronet.

== Barnewall Baronets, of Crickstown Castle (1623) ==
- Sir Patrick Barnewall, 1st Baronet (died 1624)
- Sir Richard Barnewall, 2nd Baronet (1602–c. 1662)
- Sir Patrick Barnewall, 3rd Baronet (died after 1695) who married Frances, the daughter of Richard Butler of Kilcash.
- Sir George Barnewall, 4th Baronet (died 1735)
- Sir George Barnewall, 5th Baronet (died 1750)
- Sir Thomas Barnewall, 6th Baronet (died 1790) (dormant 1790)
- Sir Bartholomew Barnewall, 7th Baronet (died 1802)
- Sir Robert Barnewall, 8th Baronet (1757–1836) (claimed title 1821)
- Sir Aylmer John Barnewall, 9th Baronet (1789–1838)
- Sir Reginald Aylmer John Barnewall, 10th Baronet (1838–1909)
- Sir John Robert Barnewall, 11th Baronet (1850–1936). Born 1850 in Essendon, Victoria, Australia. Died 1936 at Alexandra, Victoria.
- Sir Reginald John Barnewall, 12th Baronet (1888–1961)
- Sir Reginald Robert Barnewall, 13th Baronet (1924–2018)
- Sir Peter Joseph Barnewall, 14th Baronet (born 1963)

The heir apparent is the present holder's son Christopher Patrick Barnewall (born 1995).

== See also ==
- John Barnwell (colonist)
