= Harristown House, County Kildare =

Historic property in County Kildare, Ireland

Harristown House
- The house during Heritage Week 2026

- Location within Ireland

General information
- Status: Private dwelling house
- Type: House
- Architectural style: Georgian
- Location: Brannockstown; County Kildare; W91 E710, Ireland
- Coordinates: 53.13171°N 6.69142°W
- Current tenants: Beaumont family
- Estimated completion: 1662, 1740 or 1780s

Dimensions
- Diameter: Nine bays with a central breakfront of three bays

Technical details
- Material: Ashlar-faced
- Floor count: Originally three storeys over basement (After 1891 fire, reduced to two storeys)

Design and construction
- Architects: Whitmore Davis (original), James Franklin Fuller (post-1891 rebuild)
- Developer: Sir Maurice Eustace (d. 1693) or David La Touche the Second (1703-1785) or John David La Touche (1732–1810)

Website
- https://www.harristownhouse.ie/

Harristown House is an Irish country house, constructed in either 1662, 1740 or the 1780s, and is named after the townland in which it sits near the village of Brannockstown, County Kildare, Ireland, on the banks of the River Liffey. Following a fire in 1891, the house was rebuilt to a smaller design by architect James Franklin Fuller, with the original third storey removed.

As of 2026, the house acts as a language school/summer camp and occasional filming location and venue for hire.

== Harristown Castle ==
The townland of Harristown, on the edge of the Pale, was originally the site of a castle owned by the Eustace family since at least the 1470s, which in 1650 was besieged during the Irish Confederate Wars and "taken by a party of the parliamentarian forces under Colonels Hewson and Reynolds." The castle later came into the ownership of the Chetwood family. An ornamental canal (a popular feature of country estate houses in the late 1600s) and formal garden existed in the vicinity of the castle.

An account of the castle and ornamental canal, under the ownership of the Chetwoods, was recorded by a visitor to Harristown in 1748:

(It was) a large dwelling with a noble court before it, that bore the face of venerable antiquity (but yet no decay appeared in any part of its form). The situation is on the summit of an hill (sic), and the front looks down from an high (sic) eminence into the River Liffey; but what charmed us beyond imagination was a vast body of water, in an artificial bed of a large extent, where we saw a ship completely furnished, as if ready to make a long voyage by sea; her sails spread, her colours flying, anchors weighed, guns firing, and the sailors neatly dressed, everyone in their proper function, with their usual sea terms. In a neat pleasure-boat we were conveyed on board...

This artificial canal was stocked with carp and tench "whose taste equal(ed) those of Hampton Court" according to the visitor. The "ruins of Harristown Castle and artificial waterway" are listed on the Record of Protected Structures for County Kildare.

According to the National Monuments Service, the castle was "largely thrown down for building materials" in 1884, and as of 1902 only "a very small fragment" of it remained. In 1912, the castle was described as "now demolished" but in 2012, it was noted that a 1-metre-high section of wall remained standing onsite.

The footprint of where the castle once stood is located some 1.5km to the north east of where the modern Harristown House would eventually be built.

== Construction of Harristown House ==
Harristown House, as seen from the demesne's private seven-arch bridge dating from the 1600s

Some sources claim that Sir Maurice Eustace built the present-day house in 1662. It is known that the demesne's private seven-arch bridge, which crosses the River Liffey 340m to the south of the house "probably dates from the second half of the 17th-century" according to an assessment by the National Monuments Service.

In 1681, Eustace obtained a charter from King Charles II "constituting his estates (at Harristown) a manor, with power to hold courts leet and baron (and) to hold a market and two fairs at Carnallaway", a nearby townland. When Eustace died in 1704 with no male heir, the estate was inherited by his three daughters and divided into three parts - Harristown, Mullacash and Carnalway, with Eustace's eldest daughter Anne inheriting Harristown.

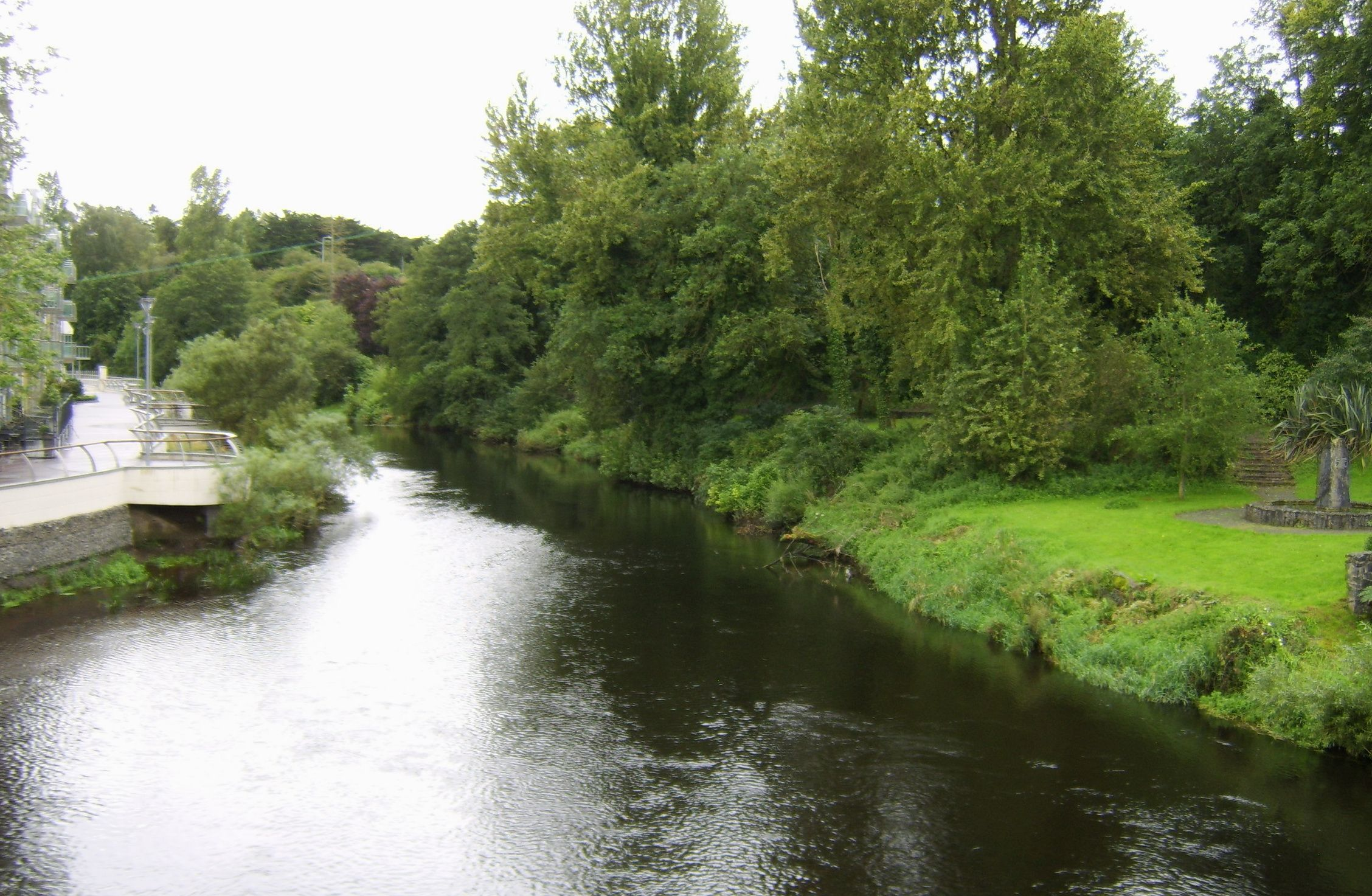
The River Liffey at Kilcullen, some kilometres downstream of Harristown

Through Anne, the Harristown estate passed to her son Eustace Chetwood, who then sold it to James FitzGerald, 1st Duke of Leinster, whose son William (2nd Duke of Leinster) eventually resold it to the La Touches in 1768.

A village design statement (VDS) produced by Kildare County Council for Brannockstown village in 2009 noted that the "Harristown Estate was built in 1740 as the county seat of the well established La Touche family", however the La Touches didn't buy the estate until 1768.

A map dating from 1752 depicts the village of Brannockstown (spelt 'Brenockstown') as a network of small roads and houses with a larger house to the north, which the VDS recognised as possibly representing the Harristown demesne. Taylor and Skinner's Maps of the Roads of Ireland published in 1783 shows a large country house with linear trees to the east of Brannockstown village (most likely Sallymount House), whereas to the north lay a second large house on the opposite side of the River Liffey described as 'Woodbank' which may possibly have also indicated the Harristown demesne.

According to oral histories collected by local schoolchildren in the 1930s from elderly Harristown residents as part of the Irish Folklore Commission's Schools' Collection project, Catholic priests, who had been outlawed from practicing Catholicism during the penal times, celebrated Mass in secret at Harristown House. These laws which had existed from the 1600s, began to be repealed from 1771 onwards. It was not specified why or how they came to use Harristown House for this function.

== La Touche ownership ==
=== La Touche family background ===
The La Touches, or Latouches, were a prominent Huguenot family, who had first arrived in Ireland as refugees from France after the Edict of Nantes (1598), initially working in textiles and poplin manufacture before moving into banking, and then politics. As the historian Arthur Aspinall noted, "Every Irish parliament in the reign of George III included a Latouche and at the Union (in 1800) there were five."

In 1753, David La Touche the Second (1703-1785), a successful banker, bought land at Ballydonagh, County Wicklow, upon which he constructed a large house from 1754-1756 which he named Bellevue.

== 1768 purchase of Harristown estate ==
Approximately twelve years after the completion of Bellevue, in 1768, David La Touche II purchased the Harristown estate from the Eustace family (whose head had been Lord Portlester). A turn of the century article in the Journal of the County Kildare Archaeological Society, however, put the date of this purchase at about 1783. La Touche II did not take up residence at Harristown upon buying the property.

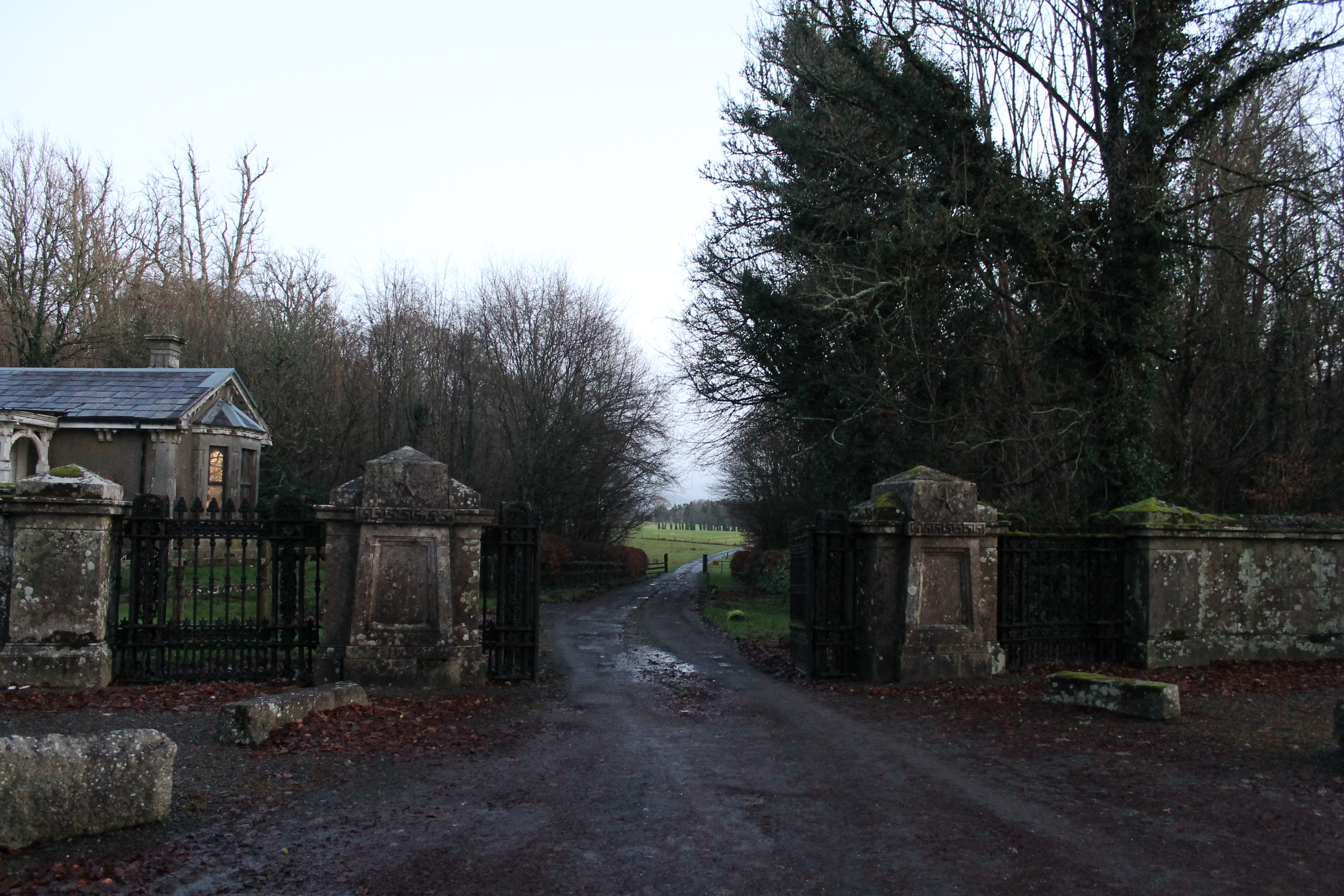
The north-west entry to the house

Upon the death of David La Touche II in 1785, his son John David La Touche (1732–1810) inherited the estate at Harristown, as well as a £7,000 a year income, and did take up residence. According to the website Historic Houses of Ireland, it was John David La Touche who commissioned the construction of Harristown House at this stage (the mid-1780s), however his entry in the Dictionary of Irish Biography makes no such reference, only to various improvements he made upon the estate:

John La Touche set about improving Harristown from c.1785; he walled his demesne, built a new bridge, and secured an act of parliament to change the route of the Naas to Dunlavin road. He also resided at town houses on Merrion Square and Ely Place, Dublin.

== Improvements to estate ==
Historian Thomas Sadleir, writing in 1912, noted that John David La Touche had "built a fine mansion at Harristown, and greatly improved the demesne" giving credence to the concept that it may have been built during his tenure. Irish architectural historian Edward McParland notes that Whitmore Davis, the architect of the initial three-storey iteration of Harristown House, was "much patronized by the La Touche family for whom he built Harristown House in Co. Kildare and who engaged him to build the Female Orphan House in Dublin (in 1792)". Little much else is known of Davis, but in 1789 it appears he "advertised in the newspapers his intention to publish engravings of some Irish country houses", although nothing ultimately came of this project.

The About Us section of the Harristown House official website maintains that the house was constructed after the La Touche purchase of 1768, noting: "Harristown demesne was purchased by the La Touche family in 1768 and a spacious Georgian mansion was erected by Whitmore Davis in a dominant position overlooking the River Liffey." According to a 2016 Irish Times article:

The house itself was reoriented at some point, as was the trend, to face away from the river and towards the avenue. Its imposing nine-bay façade with Ionic portico opens into a very grand double-sized reception with 5m ceilings, oak parquet floors, marble columns and a wood carved fireplace.

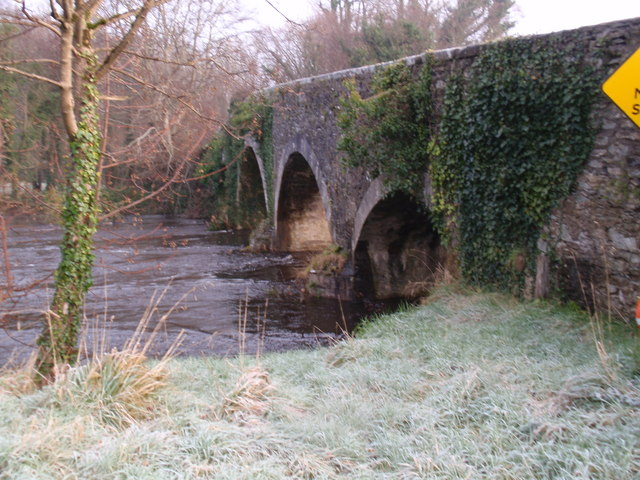
The New Bridge (1788) over the River Liffey, winter 2009

The enclosing of the estate by a boundary wall in the 1780s necessitated the deviating of the route of the original Naas to Dunlavin turnpike road, which until that point had passed right in front of the house, crossing the Liffey by the old 1600s bridge. This rerouting of the main road to outside the perimeter of the demesne required the construction of a new bridge downriver, which was completed in 1788 and cost La Touche "upwards of £1,000" to construct. A plaque installed on the bridge that year to commemorate its construction is still in place as of 2026.

The bridge was named the New Bridge on account of its having replaced the older one, and is still known locally as such, but is also known as the La Touche bridge, or Carnalway bridge and forms part of the modern R412 road. La Touche re-routed the road by power of an Act of the Irish Parliament.

== Later 18th century ==
Paintings of John La Touche and his wife Gertrude FitzGerald (daughter of Robert Uniacke Fitzgerald), as painted by the Swiss artist Angelica Kauffman remained hanging on the walls of Harristown House as of 1912. Young describes the pair being "attired in fancy dress, and must have been painted soon after their marriage (in 1763) (which) show them to be a goodlooking pair of young people".

During the 1798 Rebellion, a battle was fought at Nineteen-mile-house in the adjoining parish of Carnalway, between a party of United Irishmen and a detachment of British cavalry. A more substantial engagement took place in the churchyard of nearby Old Kilcullen on 24 May 1798 during the Battle of Kilcullen, in which 22 Crown forces were killed, including two captains named Cooke and Erskine. Many of the rebel United Irishmen who took part in the battle were subsequently massacred a few days later at the Gibbet Rath executions while attempting to surrender. A tablet was later installed at Carnalway church in memory of the deceased captain, Charles Cooke, sculpted by Charles Regnart.

The Acts of Union in 1800 changed the political landscape of Ireland forever, and the borough constituency of Harristown was disenfranchised. £15,000 compensation was paid to its patron on account of its disenfranchisement.

From its purchase in 1768, descendants of the La Touche family would continue to occupy Harristown uninterrupted until 1921.

== St Patrick's church, Carnalway ==
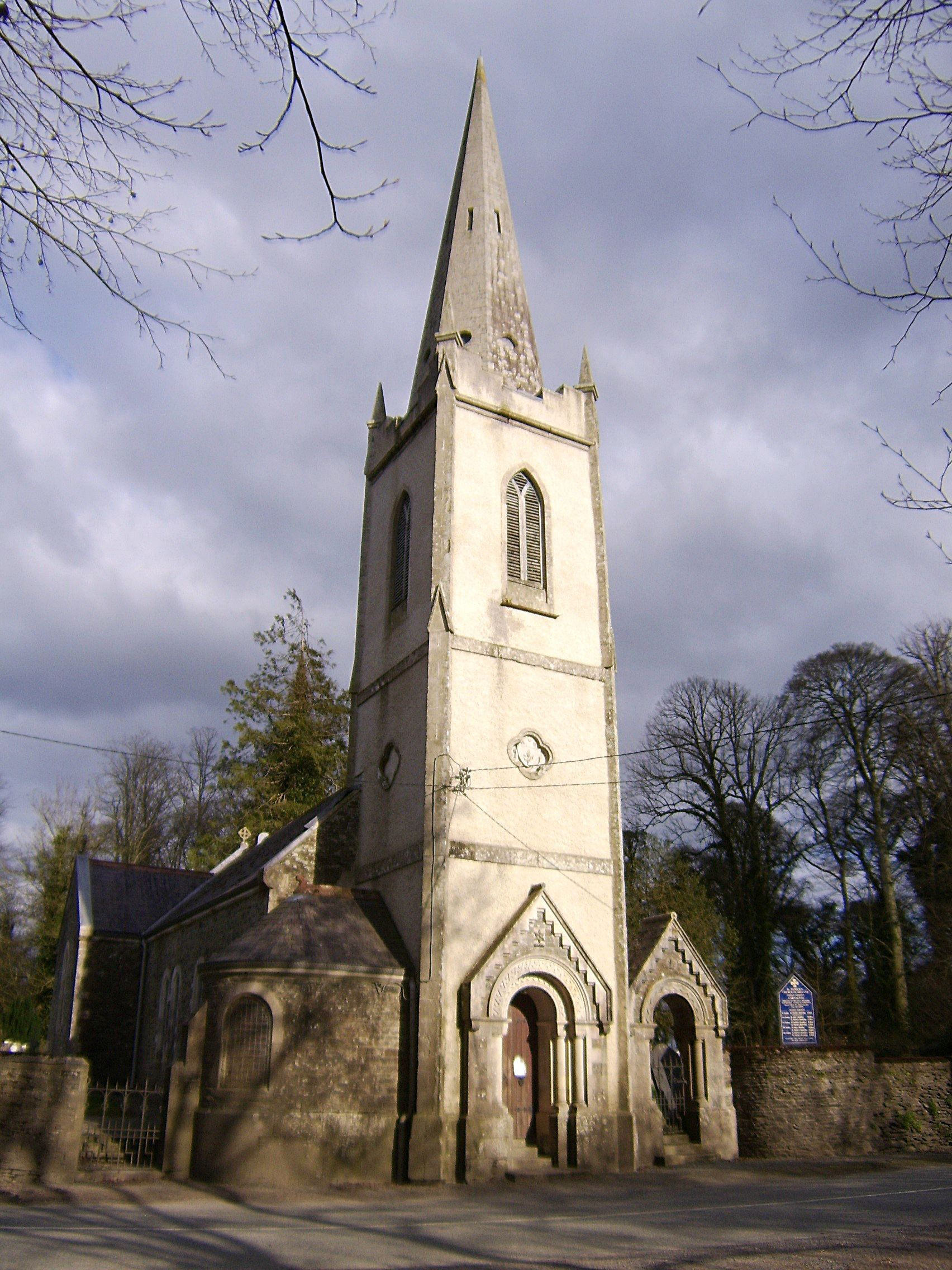
St. Patrick's Church, Carnalway, with the original 1798 tower visible

During the tenure of John David La Touche, around the year 1798, he built a church named St Patrick's to function as a Church of Ireland church for Harristown estate. In his A Topographical Dictionary of Ireland in 1837, Samuel Lewis made the following observations about the church:

The church, a very neat edifice with a tower and spire, was built by the late John La Touche, Esq. and contains a tablet to the memory of Capt. Cooke, who fell while charging the insurgents at Kilcullen bridge, in 1798. The late Board of First Fruits granted £100, in 1810, towards the erection of a glebe-house, attached to which are 10 acres of glebe.

Following an 1891 redesign, the tower from the 1798 church is the only part of the original building remaining.

== 19th century ==
Thomas Rawson, in his 1807 Statistical Survey of the County of Kildare, assessed the trees planted on the estate:

At Harristown, near Kilcullen, that very great improver John La Touche, Esq. has formed within a few years most magnificent and extensive plantations; he has adopted very much the plan of grouping each kind by itself, which prevents their injuring each other, as they invariably do, when planted promiscuously; in group plantations, if executed with taste, you have an immediate dotted carpet of various hues.

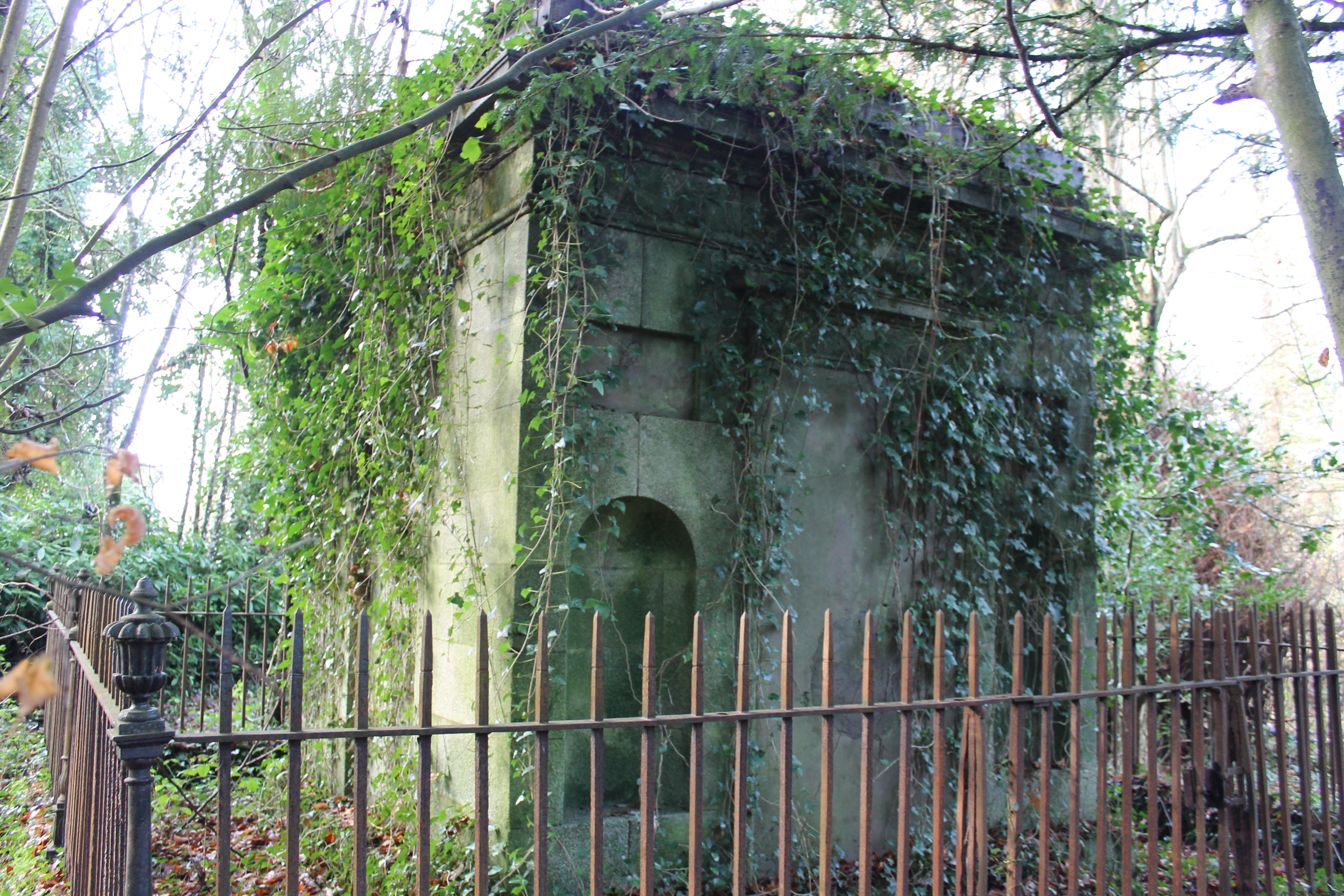
La Touche mausoleum at Carnalway church in 2025

John David La Touche died in 1810, and was buried in the mausoleum he had hired Henry Aaron Baker to build in the graveyard at Carnalway church. His son John, who succeeded him, was interested in the arts, and spent much time in Italy on the Grand Tour, returning home to Harristown with "marbles, pictures, and curios; the results of his travels". He died in 1822. Colonel Robert La Touche then inherited the estate, splitting his time between Harristown and a townhouse in Merrion Square, Dublin. Robert La Touche had already been resident at Harristown as of 1814 according to an almanac published that year.

In A Topographical Dictionary of Ireland in 1837, Lewis made the following observations about Harristown, emphasising the beauty of its location by the Liffey:

HARRISTOWN, a village (formerly a parliamentary borough), in the parish of RATHMORE, barony of NORTH NAAS (..) 2 ½ miles (N. E.) from Kilcullen-Bridge; the population is returned with the parish. This place was formerly the property of the ancient and noble family of Eustace (..) Harristown, the seat of R. Latouche, Esq., is an elegant mansion with a stately Ionic portico, beautifully situated on an eminence on the right bank of the river Liffey, which winds through the demesne and is crossed by two stone bridges, one of which, at Brannockstown, was built by the late J. Latouche, Esq., to supply the place of a very handsome bridge of seven arches, now included within the demesne. The banks of the river are richly ornamented with stately timber, and the undulating surface of the grounds has been made available to the graceful embellishment of this fine demesne.

In early 1844, The Parliamentary Gazetteer of Ireland reviewed the village and estate of Harristown, evidently before the death of Robert La Touche in May of that year:

Harristown, a small village, formerly a parliamentary borough (..) Though now an obscure and very small place, it was for many ages the site of a strong castle, and the residence of the dignified family of Eustace (..) The estate of Harristown descended to Mr. Chetwode, the maternal grandson of Sir Maurice Eustace (..) and it was sold by him to first Duke of Leinster, and again sold by the second Duke of Leinster to John Latouche, Esq., the ancestor of its present proprietor, Robert Latouche, Esq. (..) The demesne adjoins the village, is the most extensive in a wide circuit of country, and derives much beauty from the meanderings of the Liffey. Near the village is one of those taper upright stones with conical tops, which are supposed to have been connected with the religious ceremonies of the Druids...

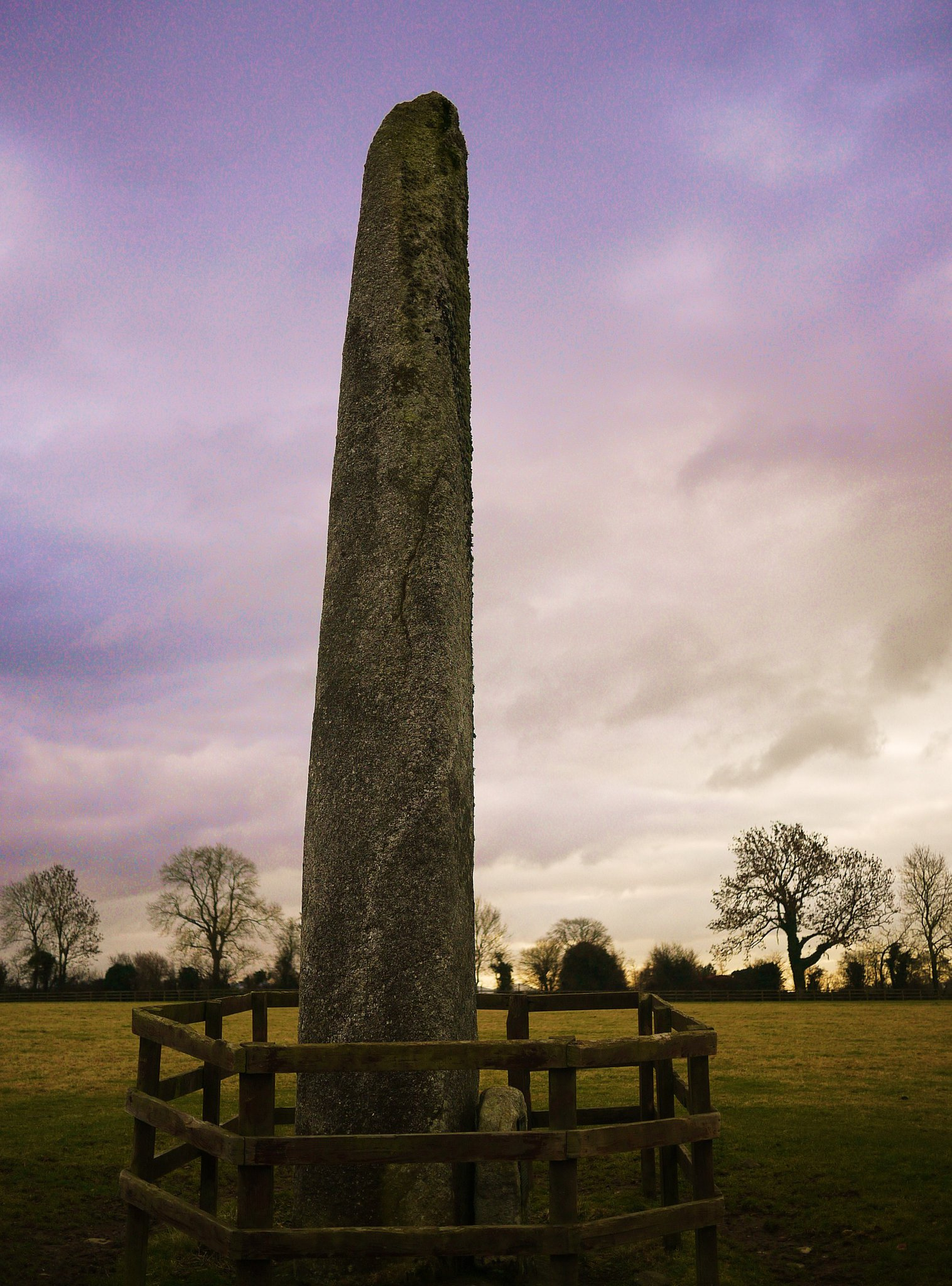
The Punchestown Longstone, not far from Harristown, which may have been the stone referenced by The Parliamentary Gazetteer of Ireland in 1844

Two events from the Irish Folklore Commission's Schools' Collection recount oral histories from Harristown gathered under the theme of 'Industries and Crafts of the District of Olden Times'; the first of which originated from the c.1830s and recounted a silk factory at "the Malt house" near Gormanstown which was closed down by the presiding La Touche as he "thought that the Irish were too industrious". Following its closure, the doors were allegedly taken off the factory and re-used at Harristown House. Another folk memory recounted that during the c.1850s, a flour mill which had existed in "Newbury Wood" was burnt down by "Mr. La Touche" after he took offence to his daughter being referred to as a "miller's daughter" in a poem. It was not specified which La Touche had supposedly been involved in these acts.

John "The Master" La Touche (1814–1904) inherited the house in 1844 and lived there for the next 62 years alongside his wife, the novelist Maria Catherine Price La Touche. Maria La Touche wrote two novels, "The Clintons" (1853), and "Lady Willoughby" (1855), both published in London. She was adverse to blood sports, and often complained about the neighbouring gentry who engaged in fox hunting. They lived at the estate in the summer, but spent winters in London, engaging in the social season there.

In the 1852 edition of Thom's Irish Almanac and Official Directory, John La Touche D.L. (deputy lieutenant) of Harristown, Kilcullen was listed as being a magistrate for the County of Kildare.

John and Maria had three children: Emily (born 1844), Percy (born 1846), and Rose (born 1849). Rose became the object of the "crazed infatuation" of writer John Ruskin, though his offers of marriage were refused. The family had met Ruskin in London in 1858. Both daughters died young, Emily in 1868 and Rose in 1875. Rose was buried in the mausoleum behind Carnalway Church.

During the Great Irish Famine (1845-1852), John was sympathetic to the suffering of his tenants, "allowing no white bread or pastry to be made, and only the simplest dishes to appear on his table. The deer-park at Harristown ceased at this time to have any deer in it; all were made into food for the starving people." According to the 'La Touche Legacy', a history society dedicated to the family, John "busied himself with his farm tenants, and supported Land Reform under Gladstone".

In July 1855, men cutting turf near Urlingford on the Bog of Allen found a large roll of bog butter buried nine feet below the ground on the property of John Latouche: "a few bones of animals were discovered near it, but it was not enclosed in any casing. The lump, resembling in shape exactly a modern roll of butter, was then quite perfect, but was now divided into three pieces, one fracture having accidentally taken place at the time of finding".

Around 1857, John La Touche first heard the preaching of Dr. Charles Spurgeon in London and soon became a convert to Spurgeon's brand of evangelism, even opting to becoming baptised by him at the Metropolitan Tabernacle in Elephant and Castle. Around 1870, La Touche initiated Bible studying classes in Harristown House, which became the start of a local Baptist church group, who later convened in Rose Cottage, Brannockstown, named after John's youngest daughter. He also started becoming involved in Christian relief projects in London, raising money to support "fallen women", and was instrumental in the founding of the London City Mission. In 1882, he built a Baptist chapel and manse (clergy house) in Brannockstown village. According to Richard Blayney, the pastor of Brannockstown Baptist Church in 2021, "there is a lingering question of whether tenants and employees of the Master of Harristown were expected to attend the (religious) services in Brannockstown. In the years since then, some have even maintained that regular attendance of the Baptist church was a condition of employment at Harristown". As of 2021, the church was still in use, drawing regular attendees from as far as 40 kilometres away.

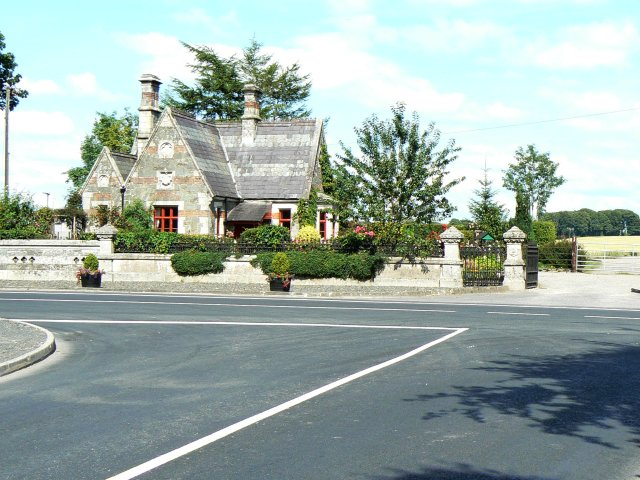
The gatelodge at Brannockstown (constructed between 1870 and 1890)

Between 1870 and 1890, the gate lodge at the Brannockstown entrance to the estate was constructed, according to the National Inventory of Architectural Heritage, although the Dictionary of Irish Architects puts the date at 1864. The gate lodge, in Byzantine style, is "prominently sited to north-east of the crossroads and terminates the vista of the road leading into the village from the south-west". The other gatelodge on the Harristown estate, to the north of the house at Carnalway crossroads, has not been reviewed yet by the NIAH as of 2026, nor has Harristown House itself.

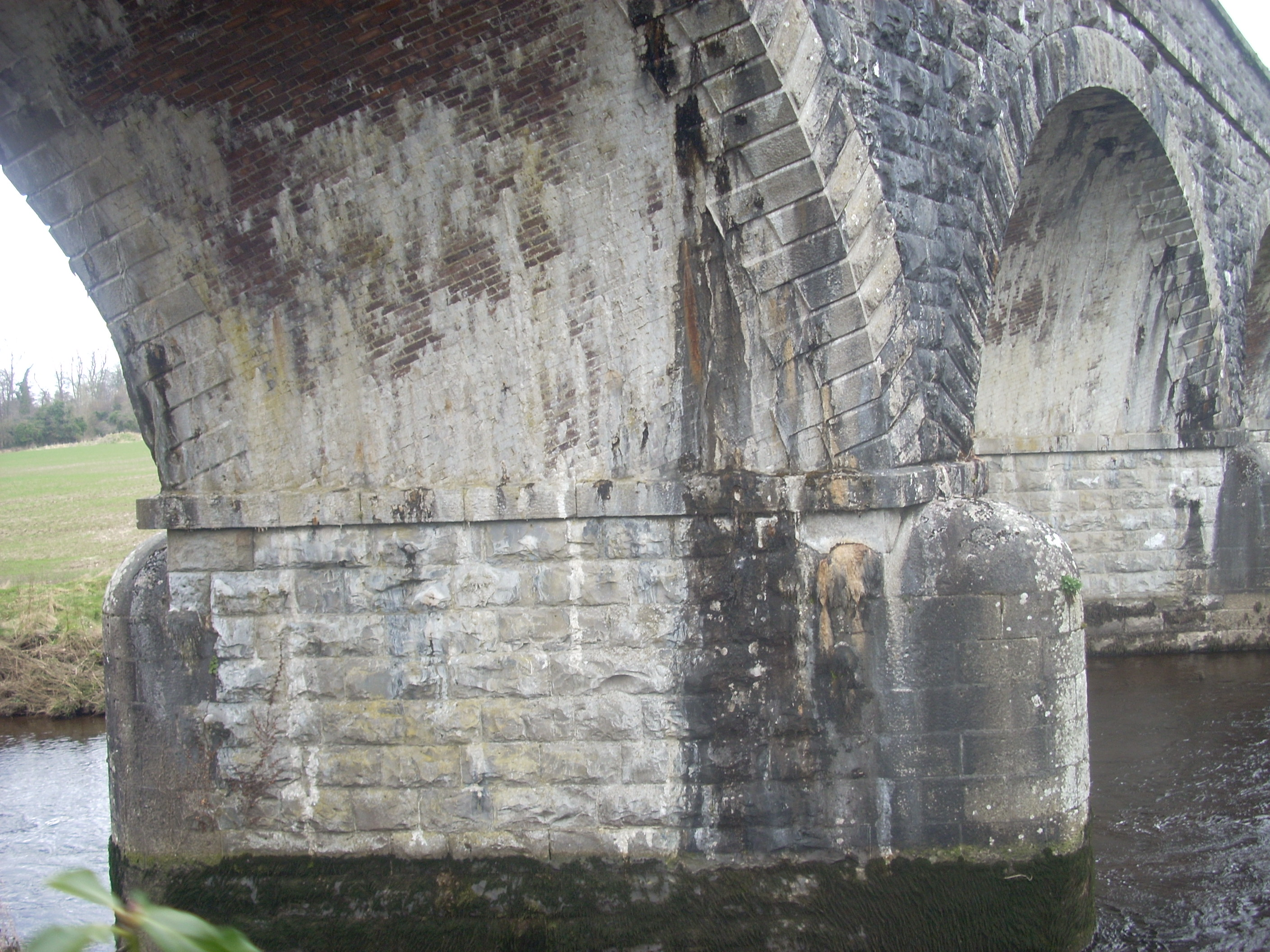
Detail of the stonework in the buttresses of the railway viaduct at Harristown, in 2009

From March 1883, construction began on a railway to connect Sallins with Baltinglass (and a further extension to Tullow). The railway passed 900m east of the house, where a substantial viaduct was constructed to facilitate it across the Liffey. The line to Baltinglass was opened in September 1885, and the extension to Tullow opened in June 1886. A railway station was opened at Harristown, although it was much closer to the site of the ruined Harristown Castle than to Harristown House. A dedicated station master (and family) lived onsite at Harristown station. The increasing popularity of the motorcar at the time meant that ultimately passenger numbers on the route began to decline, and the last regular passenger service was withdrawn in January 1947. The line eventually closed completely in 1959.

It was under John La Touche's direction that the majority of the remains of Portlester Castle (aka Harristown Castle) were knocked down in 1884 in order to build a national school from the rubble at Brannockstown, which opened in 1885. The school survived for twenty years, but under his son, Percy, the pupils moved to the national school at Carnalway. The school re-opened in 1928 under Catholic management and was still in use as of 2025, under the name of Brannoxtown Community National School.

== 1891 fire ==
The original house was "destroyed" in 1891 following a fire, and was rebuilt by architect James Franklin Fuller, one of "the most prolific builders of country seats in the late 19th century" according to the Leinster Leader. Fuller reduced the size of the house from three storeys to two, but retained the La Touche coat of arms which still stood over the archway into the house as of 2016. The official website of Harristown House notes that:

The omission of the third storey allows for an unusual amount of light into the house through a cleverly constructed lantern light. Thus the move from the airy and bright downstairs rooms is complemented by a rush of light from the upstairs hallway.

Fuller oversaw the restoration of the house at the same time as rebuilding St Patricks church at the entrance to the estate at Carnalway. While the house was being rebuilt, the La Touche family stayed at a cottage in Brannockstown village.

A folk memory relating to the fire was recorded in the 1930s by the Irish Folklore Commission. A local child named Jennie Ffrench relayed information about the event from her mother, who incorrectly recalled 1888 as the year in which the event happened:

In the year 1888, Harristown house, the residence of John La Touche Esq. which is about four miles from Kilcullen, was burned to the ground. The fire broke out in a maid's rooms and spread through the whole house. The only victim was a cat owned by the housekeeper, who buried it near the ruins and put a small tombstone over it, bearing the words - "In remembrance of Stella who was a victim of the fire". The tombstone can be seen to this day in the grounds of the present Harristown house, now owned by Dr Graham.

=== St Patrick's Church redesign ===
The Reverend William Somerville-Large was appointed to Carnalway in 1887, whereupon an evangelical member of the La Touche banking family "attempted to block his appointment", and "got his agent to urge the church wardens to lock the new Rector out of his church, whilst a fellow minister sent a letter round the parish denouncing Somerville–Large's opinions". Soon after his arrival, Somerville-Large began attempts at 'beautifying' the church.

Whilst Harristown House was being restored following the fire, the church at Carnalway was remodelled also, presumably under Somerville-Large's direction, and with financial help from the wealthy parishioner Mrs Wakefield. These works were seen as not being universally welcomed by the parishioners. With the exception of the tower, the church was gutted and rebuilt in the Hiberno-Romanesque style of architecture, "a revival of a style which came to prominence in Ireland in the twelfth century". The official Harristown House website states that Fuller "rebuilt it in the Hiberno Romanesque style similar to that of his masterpiece at Millicent."

According to the Kildare eHistory Journal, the interior redesign was inspired by Cormac's Chapel on the Rock of Cashel. James Franklin Fuller, diocesan architect, who also completed restoration work on St. Brigid's Cathedral in Kildare town designed the rebuild. John Ninian Comper (1864–1960) produced stained glass windows for the new church. The new church was eventually consecrated on 22 December 1892.

Fine mosaic work and marble facing existed on the interior walls of the church as of 1998. The official Harristown House website states that Fuller "rebuilt (the church) in the Hiberno Romanesque style similar to that of his masterpiece at Millicent."

Folk history relating to the churchyard and local Catholic sentiment was recorded in the 1930s by the Irish Folklore Commission:

In Carnalway there is a churchyard. Some of this is consecrated for Catholics. When the protestants wanted to build a wall they were digging up some of the skeletons of Catholics. The Catholics disagreed and the priests also. Then the got up on the wall and walked on the masoners fingers. Mr. Johnie La Touce said to leave the wall unmade that priests were "edged tools" (La Touche was owner of the land and was a very bigotted Protestant.)

In his memoir, Somerville–Large recalled the situation when workmen, "in digging new foundations disturbed several graves and desecrated the remains". The matter was brought before the Naas Petty Sessions, where Somerville–Large was acquitted.

== Final La Touche years ==
John "The Master" La Touche died in 1904 at the age of 90, after which Mrs. La Touche left Kildare to reside in Dublin, where she too died in 1906. The estate passed to their son Percy, who was a figure in high society and a favourite of King Edward VII. The material collected by the Irish Folklore Commission indicates that on at least one occasion the tenants "rose up against" Percy La Touche during an attempted eviction.

The 1911 census of Ireland was taken on the evening of 2 April 1911, during which it was noted that 64 year old 'Robert Percy O'Connor La Touche' was head of the household at Harristown; alongside his wife Annette Louisa, 66, their 27-year-old nephew Samuel Treherne Bassett Saunderson, ten-year-old grand-nephew Adrian Clements Gore, and a complement of seven domestic workers, including a butler, cook, lady's maid, pair of housemaids, kitchen maid, and footman. All but one of the domestic workers had been born in Great Britain. Percy La Touche's occupation was noted as "D.L.T.P. Co Kildare", an abbreviation that could possibly indicate "Does not like to profess".

Upon Percy's death in 1921, his sister Emily's son succeeded, and the estate subsequently passed out of the La Touche family name thereafter, going through two other owners (one of which being a Doctor Graham), before finally being sold in 1946 to Major Michael Wentworth Beaumont (1903-1958), a Conservative Party politician and former soldier.

The house had survived the turbulent Irish revolutionary period (1919–1923), which saw at least 275 country houses deliberately burned down, blown up, or otherwise destroyed by the Irish Republican Army (IRA). (see: Destruction of Irish country houses).

=== Stained-glass at Carnalway ===
Irish satirist George A. Birmingham (the pseudonym of clerygman Canon James Owen Hannay) (1865–1950), was a personal friend of Percy La Touche and his wife Lady Annette La Touche. The author Andrew Gailey writes:

To Hannay, Percy La Touche was the model of the well read paternal landlord, while she was a veritable figure of Legend. Punchestown was the highlight of the local social calendar and, when Lady La Touche had cleared the chickens out of the ballroom, her golden wedding celebrations compared with the grand occasions of the ascendancy in its heyday. By the end of 1920 however, the La Touches were dead, their neighbours the Ponsonbys had left for Devon, and Hannay's parish had dwindled from a peak of 150 to virtually nothing. Fittingly, when he left, the cattle were wandering untended over the lawns of a deserted Harristown.

Hannay later commissioned Harry Clarke to complete a small stained glass window in memory of Percy and Lady Annette for St. Patrick's church. The window depicts Saint Hubert, and was installed in late 1921. On a number of occasions, An Post have released postage stamps featuring details of the window.

== Beaumont ownership ==
Upon acquiring the property in 1946, MW Beaumont "completely renovated" and restored the house, "installing furniture, pictures and Carrara marble fireplaces from their former home Wotton in Buckinghamshire", the interior of which had been designed by Sir John Soane.

According to the official Harristown House website:

Doreen Beaumont brought some of the Soanian influence to bear on her new home and thus the colours she used are not those traditionally associated with an Irish Georgian house. Further there are other finishes and artefacts that reflect a more eclectic approach to interior design.

In the 1940s, the kitchen in the house was relocated from the basement upstairs to the sitting room at ground level, a room with a deep bow window that was described as a "homely country kitchen" by the Irish Times.

In 1953, whilst ploughing a field north of Harristown House, local man Robert H. Smith unearthed a gold hair-ring (lock ring), which was noted in the Review of the Journal of the Co. Kildare Archaeological Society.

== Chinoiserie ==
Two rooms at Harristown were noted to have been decorated with Chinese wallpaper as of 1957 (following the chinoiserie aesthetic). The Journal of the Royal Society of Antiquaries of Ireland explained at the time that the rooms:

...represent very recent additions indeed to the list of examples in Ireland. In several ways, however, they are of exceptional interest. Thus the specimen in the drawing room, with its very lovely "bird-and-plant" forms on a pale green ground had never been utilised at all until it was put up at Harristown by Major and Mrs. M. Beaumont in 1949, for it had been kept, unused, since the original importation into England a little over two hundred years ago. As can be seen from the illustration in Plate XVIII it is rather more elaborate than most early specimens of that style - a possible explanation being that it is supposed to have come from the East through a Dutch trading company and to have received some additional ornamentation in Holland. Incidentally preservation for so long, unused, thought (sic) certainly rare, is not unique. Chinese rice papers were so fine that they took up very little space, and moreover were not mounted onto the strong lining papers until they were actually about to be put up. Though also beautiful, the second example at Harristown House belongs to the more ordinary "bird-and-plant" form type of the later eighteenth century - some of the birds again being applied. Unlike the paper in the drawing room, this one was removed from the house in England (Wotton), and the result says almost as much for the quality of the material as for the skill of those who accomplished the transfer.

The official Harristown House website describes the "16th Century Chinese Wallpaper in a sitting room leading off the drawing room which depicts birds in strong vibrant colours" as "the best kept secret" of the house.

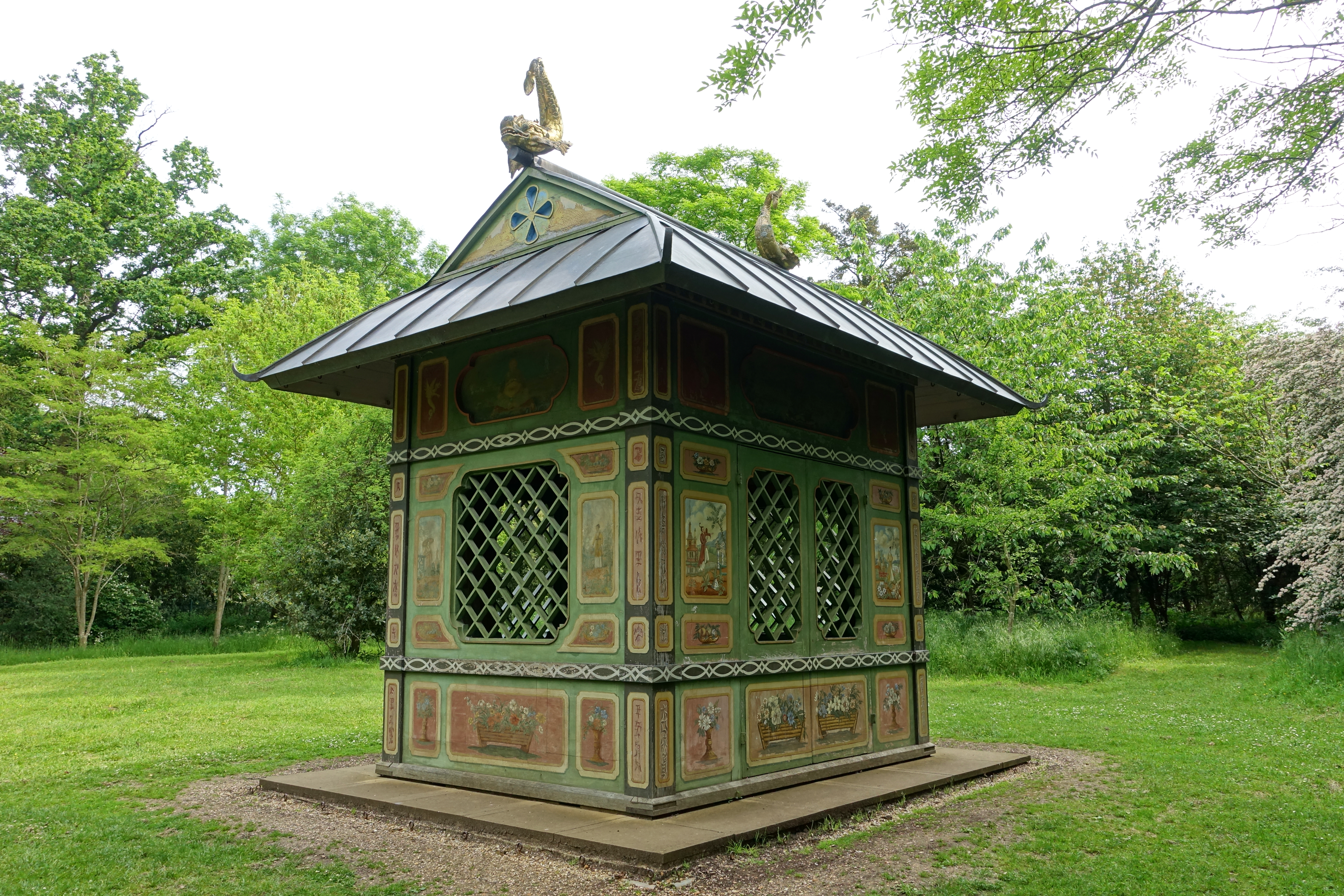
The Chinese House at Stowe, in 2012

Also in 1957, Beaumont transported an early-18th century decorative construction known as The Chinese House from his Wotton estate to Harristown. Built pre-1738, originally at Stowe Gardens in Buckinghamshire, it was the first known building in England to have been built in the Chinese style, and even one of the first in the West. A small structure made of pine wood, measuring 12 by 10 feet, it was painted inside and out on canvas by the Italian painter Francesco Sleter (1685-1775), intended as a curio for a pond setting. In 1992, the house was purchased by the National Trust in the UK and returned to Stowe.

== Modern era ==
The ground floor of the house consists of three main reception rooms, a library, a drawing room and a dining room, which all have 18-foot high ceilings. According to the official Harristown House website "Among the other curiosities (in the house) is an upstairs room finished in oak panelling taken from a Tudor house in England and a set of French Empire pelmets." The house comprises 12,000 square foot with an additional 6,000 square foot basement.

In 1998, a "major restoration programme" began at St Patrick's Church, Carnalway to remedy serious structural faults in the building. It was recorded that by December 1998, parishioners of the Newbridge union of parishes had already spent £13,500 on conservation works, and expected to spend another £15,000 in the immediate future. A dedicated heritage committee was formed by the parishioners to oversee the works, and to raise enough money to finish the project. In September 2000, the Bishop of Meath and Kildare re-dedicated the church on completion of the restoration works.

In 2000, Halverstown Cricket Club (originally founded on the grounds of Halverstown House, Kilcullen in 1885) moved to a new location on the grounds of Harristown estate, where they have remained since. According to the club's official website, its training grounds at Harristown are "nestled among ancient oaks and broad-leafed trees, creating a true oasis for cricket lovers".

=== Language school ===
As of April 2025, a language school was operating at Harristown House offering French classes to children from the age of 7 upwards, as well as after-school preparation classes for students of French in the Junior and Leaving Cert programmes.

The house also offered exam preparation, in group or individual classes, for teens/adults preparing for the English language tests of IELTS, TOEFL, Cambridge Assessment English and MFL. Noella Beaumont was acting summer-camp hostess and resident English teacher as of 2019.

=== Filming location ===
As of April 2025, the house (including internal décor and furnishings) had been used for productions including Aristocrats (1999), Foyle's War (2015), Sacrifice (2016), Quantico (2018), and Vita & Virginia (2018).

In addition to the house, the "unchanged" 18th century farm buildings and stables have been used in Frankie Starlight (1995) and Black '47 (2018), and the "expansive" driveway which leads up to the house, as well as the private estate bridge, have appeared in the Irish productions Trojan Eddie (1996) and The Butcher Boy (1997).

=== Venue hire ===
The house is available as a venue for event hire, and can accommodate 200 people in the downstairs rooms, and can sleep 12 people upstairs across six en-suite double-bedrooms.

=== Ad hoc events ===
In April 2016, the Kildare and West Wicklow Society for the Prevention of Cruelty to Animals (KWWSPCA) held a 'Bridge Day' at the house to raise money for their cause. Noella and Hubert Beaumont were thanked for their hospitality in receiving the group.

In July 2024, members of the Irish Georgian Society visited the house as part of a day tour entitled 'Houses and Gardens of Leinster'.

== Maintenance and future ==
In September 2016, the house and demesne of 750 acres were put on sale with an asking price of €25 million. Owner Hubert Beaumont expressed that the decision to move was "very much tinged with regret (but) To continue living here would have meant breaking up the land and I just couldn't do that. It needs a buyer with the means to retain it intact. For us it just didn't make sense any more." Beaumont noted that Section 482 status and various heritage grants were not enough to keep up with the costs of running an estate that large, and that the decision to sell was born out of this:

"Keeping a house like this is a constant maintenance job. Just when you have had a great harvest there's a big job to be done like renovating the portico [a €65,000 job] or removing asbestos. In 30 years we've done all we can to preserve the house intact. The grants are generous but just not enough, you still need lots of capital to provide matching funding," Hubert says.

In September 2022, Hubert and wife Noella Beaumont were still living at Harristown, and thanked Kildare County Council for their recent support towards the upkeep of the property, after receiving a grant of €6,600 under the 'Built Heritage Investment Scheme' (BHIS). The grant had supported works on the interior structural repair of an upstairs bedroom. Kildare News reported that "Harristown House is one of 170 houses, gardens and buildings of interest which welcome visitors for 60 days a year under the Section 482 scheme that allows owners off-set renovation and maintenance costs against income tax."

In May 2023, it was reported that plans had been lodged by Delamain Solar Farm Limited to Kildare County Council regarding a solar farm they wished to install in the Brannockstown area, consisting of rows of solar photovoltaic panels. The proposed development would span "nearly 250 hectares", part of which would cross into the Harristown House demesne.

As of 2026, the Harristown estate remains in the ownership of the Beaumont family.

== Location and access ==
The house admits public visitors as part of open days on occasion.

== Local stud farms ==
The area of County Kildare in which the house is located is known for the quality of its limestone soil, and success in breeding successful racehorses. Nearby stud farms include those owned by the Aga Khan IV (Gilltown and Sallymount - home of Sea the Stars), Prince Khalid Abdullah's New Abbey Stud as well as the Ardenode Stud, Hollyhill Stud, Newberry Stud and Ragusa Stud.

== See also ==
- Harristown House, near Kinnegad
- Harristown House, near Castlerea Prison
- List of historic houses in the Republic of Ireland
- Marlay House, Rathfarnham, Dublin, also constructed by the La Touches
- Bellevue House, Delgany, County Wicklow also constructed by the La Touches

== Sources ==
- Berry, Jonathan (1998). "Chinoiserie aux Champs Élysées". Historic Gardens Review (3): 15–20. JSTOR 44790304.
- Clarke, George; Marsden, Jonathan; Wheeler, Richard; Bevington, Michael; Knox, Tim (1997). Stowe Landscape Gardens. London: National Trust.
- Gailey, Andrew (1992). "An Irishman's World". The Irish Review (Cork). 13 (13): 31–39. doi:10.2307/29735676. JSTOR 29735676.
- Leet, Ambrose (1814). A Directory To The Market Towns, Villages, Gentlemen's Seats And Other Noted Places in Ireland. Dublin: Brett Smith, 46, Mary-Street.
- Lewis (Vol I), Samuel (1837). A Topographical Dictionary of Ireland. Vol. I. London: S. Lewis and Company.
- Lewis (Vol II), Samuel (1837). A Topographical Dictionary of Ireland. Vol. II. London: S. Lewis and Company.
- Longfield, A. K.; Leask, H. G. (1957). "Old Wall-Papers in Ireland: 5. More English, Chinese and French Examples". The Journal of the Royal Society of Antiquaries of Ireland. 87 (2): 141–146. JSTOR 25509287.
- McParland, Edward (1 September 1972). "The Papers of Bryan Bolger, Measurer". Dublin Historical Record. 25 (4): 120–131. JSTOR 30104341.
- O'Callaghan, P. (1856). "Proceedings and Papers. General Meeting, held in the Assembly Rooms, Kilkenny, on Wednesday, September 3rd, 1856". The Journal of the Kilkenny and South-East of Ireland Archaeological Society. 1: 147–169. JSTOR 25502504.
- Rawson, Thomas James (1807). Statistical Survey of the County of Kildare: With Observations on the Means of Improvement; Drawn Up for the Consideration, and by Direction of the Dublin Society. Dublin: The Dublin Society (Royal Dublin Society).
- S., C. (1954). "Reviewed work: Cois Feoire, Eoghan Ó Ceallaigh". The Journal of the Royal Society of Antiquaries of Ireland. 84 (2): 193. JSTOR 25509189.
- Stokes, Miss Margaret (1899). "Old Kilcullen". Journal of the Co. Kildare Archaeological Society and Surrounding Districts. 2 (1896–1899). Dublin: Edward Ponsonby, 116 Grafton Street: 431–446.
- Young, Margaret F. (1912). "The LaTouche Family of Harristown, County Kildare". Journal of the County Kildare Archaeological Society. VII: 33–40.
- Sadleir, Thomas Ulick (1912). "Kildare Members of Parliament. 1559-1800". Journal of the County Kildare Archaeological Society. VII: 41–45.
- Thom, Alexander, ed. (1852). Thom's Irish Almanac and Official Directory, with the Post-Office Dublin City and County Directory, for the year 1852. Dublin: Alexander Thom, Printer and Publisher, 87 and 88, Abbey-Street.
- Writer, Staff (1846). The Parliamentary Gazetteer of Ireland, Adapted To The New Poor-Law, Franchise, Municipal And Ecclesiastical Arrangements, And Compiled With A Special Reference To The Lines Of Railroad And Canal Communication, As Existing In 1844–45 (Vol. II: D–M). Dublin, London And Edinburgh: A. Fullarton & Co.
