= Grayden =

Grayden is a surname. Notable people with the surname include:

- Bill Grayden (1920–2026), Australian politician
- David Grayden (1924–2003), Australian politician
- Sprague Grayden (born 1980), American actress

== See also ==
- Grayden, West Virginia
- Graydon (name)
