= Maria La Touche =

Irish novelist (1824–1906)

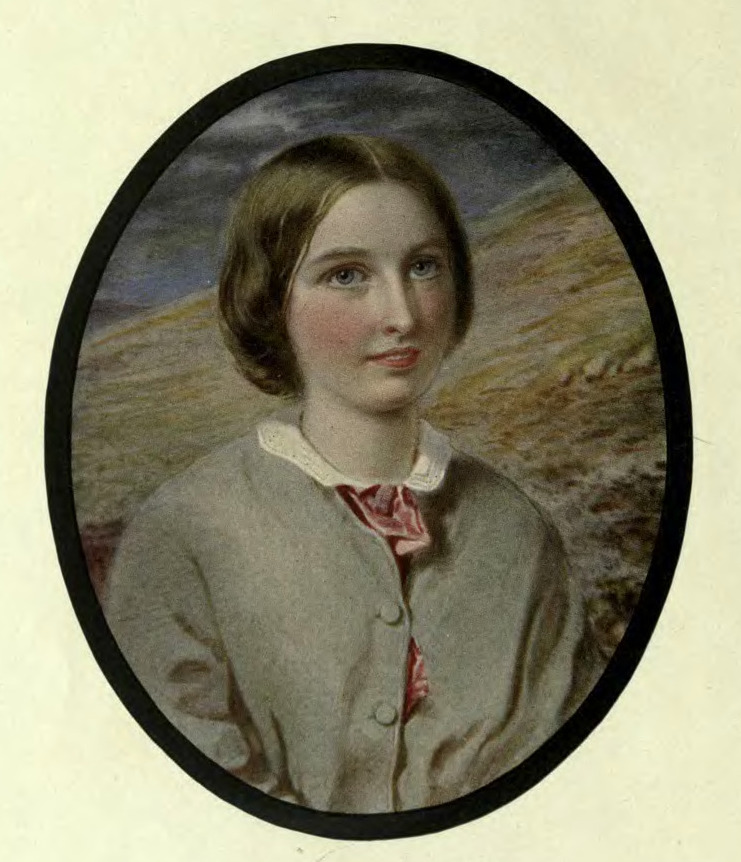
- Born: 15 December 1824; Desart Court
- Died: 1906; Dublin
- Occupation: Novelist
- Spouse: John La Touche
- Children: 3, including Rose La Touche

Maria Catherine Price La Touche (15 December 1824 – 21 November 1906) was an Irish writer.

Maria Catherine Price was born on 15 December 1824 at Desart Court in County Kilkenny, Ireland. She was the daughter of Rose Lambart Price, eldest son of Sir Rose Price, 1st Baronet, and Catherine O'Connor, widow of John Otway Cuffe, 2nd Earl of Desart. Her father died when she was an infant. Maria Price divided her time as a child between Brighton and Desart, and was educated at home.

On 16 May 1843, she married John La Touche, son of the MP Robert La Touche. They lived at his estate, Harristown in County Kildare, spending winters in London. They had three children: Emily (born 1844), Percy (born 1846), and Rose (born 1848). Rose La Touche became the object of the "crazed infatuation" of critic John Ruskin, though his offers of marriage were refused. The family had met Ruskin in London in 1858. Both daughters died young, Emily in 1868 and Rose in 1875.

Maria La Touche's literary career began with a poem she published at age twelve. As a married woman, she participated with her friends in the Alethemene, a society to study art, literature and languages. In the 1850s she published two novels, The Clintons (1853) and Lady Willoughby (1855). Margaret Ferrier Young wrote that they were written "more as an amusement than for graver reasons. Perhaps because of this they were not successful, and are now quite forgotten." She also published poetry and essays and tracts on various topics. She translated works by Pauline de la Ferronnays with her cousin, Maria Catherine Bishop.

La Touche was a keen gardener and very knowledgeable about plants. In the 1880s, she assisted Ruskin with his botanical work, Proserpina. Her other pastimes included breeding canaries.

After her husband's death in 1904 she went to Dublin, and died there on 21 November 1906.

A selection of her correspondence was published in 1908 as The letters of a noble woman: Mrs. La Touche of Harristown, edited by Margaret Ferrier Young.

== Bibliography ==
- The Clintons: or, Deeps and Shallows of Life. 3 vol. London: Bentley, 1853.
- Lady Willoughby: or, The Double Marriage. 3 vol. London: Hurst and Blackett, 1855.
- The letters of a noble woman: Mrs. La Touche of Harristown, 1908.
