= Arthur Burdett =

Irish politician

Arthur Burdett (died December 1796) was an Irish politician.

Burdett was the Member of Parliament for Harristown in the Irish House of Commons between 1790 and his death in 1796.

Parliament of Ireland
Preceded by Sir FitzGerald Aylmer, Bt; Thomas Burgh	Member of Parliament for Harristown; 1790–1796; With: Sir FitzGerald Aylmer, Bt (1790-1794); Robert La Touche (1794-1796)	Succeeded by Robert La Touche; John La Touche
