= Thomas Burgh (1754–1832) =

Irish politician (1754–1832)

Member of Parliament for Harristown
- In office 1783–1790 Serving with Sir FitzGerald Aylmer, Bt
- Preceded by: Richard Allen; Charles John Crowle
- Succeeded by: Sir FitzGerald Aylmer, Bt; Arthur Burdett
- In office 1775–1776 Serving with Robert Graydon
- Preceded by: Garret FitzGerald; Robert Graydon
- Succeeded by: Sir FitzGerald Aylmer, Bt; Maurice Keating

Personal details
- Born: Thomas Burgh; January 25, 1754
- Died: 1832 (aged 77–78)
- Education: Trinity College, Dublin

Thomas Burgh (25 January 1754 – 1832) was an Irish politician who was MP for Harristown in the Irish House of Commons (1775–1776 and 1783–1790) and Athy (1776–1783).

== Biography ==
Burgh was educated at Trinity College, Dublin.

Burgh represented Harristown in the Irish House of Commons between 1775 and 1776, before sitting for Athy from 1776 to 1783. He then returned to representing Harristown between 1783 and 1790.

== See also ==
- House of Burgh, an Anglo-Norman and Hiberno-Norman dynasty founded in 1193

Parliament of Ireland
Preceded by Garret FitzGerald; Robert Graydon	Member of Parliament for Harristown; 1775–1776; With: Robert Graydon	Succeeded by Sir FitzGerald Aylmer, Bt; Maurice Keating
Preceded by Walter Hussey Burgh; William de Burgh	Member of Parliament for Athy; 1776–1783; With: Thomas Burgh	Succeeded by Lord Edward FitzGerald; Thomas Burgh
Preceded by Richard Allen; Charles John Crowle	Member of Parliament for Harristown; 1783–1790; With: Sir FitzGerald Aylmer, Bt	Succeeded by Sir FitzGerald Aylmer, Bt; Arthur Burdett
