= John Graydon (disambiguation) =

John Graydon (1666–1726) was an English navy officer.

John Graydon may also refer to:

- John Graydon (politician) (1693–1774), Irish politician
- Michael John Graydon Soroka (born 1997), Canadian baseball pitcher

== See also ==
- Graydon (disambiguation)
- Graydon (name)
