= Murrough O'Brien, 1st Marquess of Thomond =

Irish peer, soldier and politician

The Most Honourable The Marquess of Thomond KP PC (Ire)
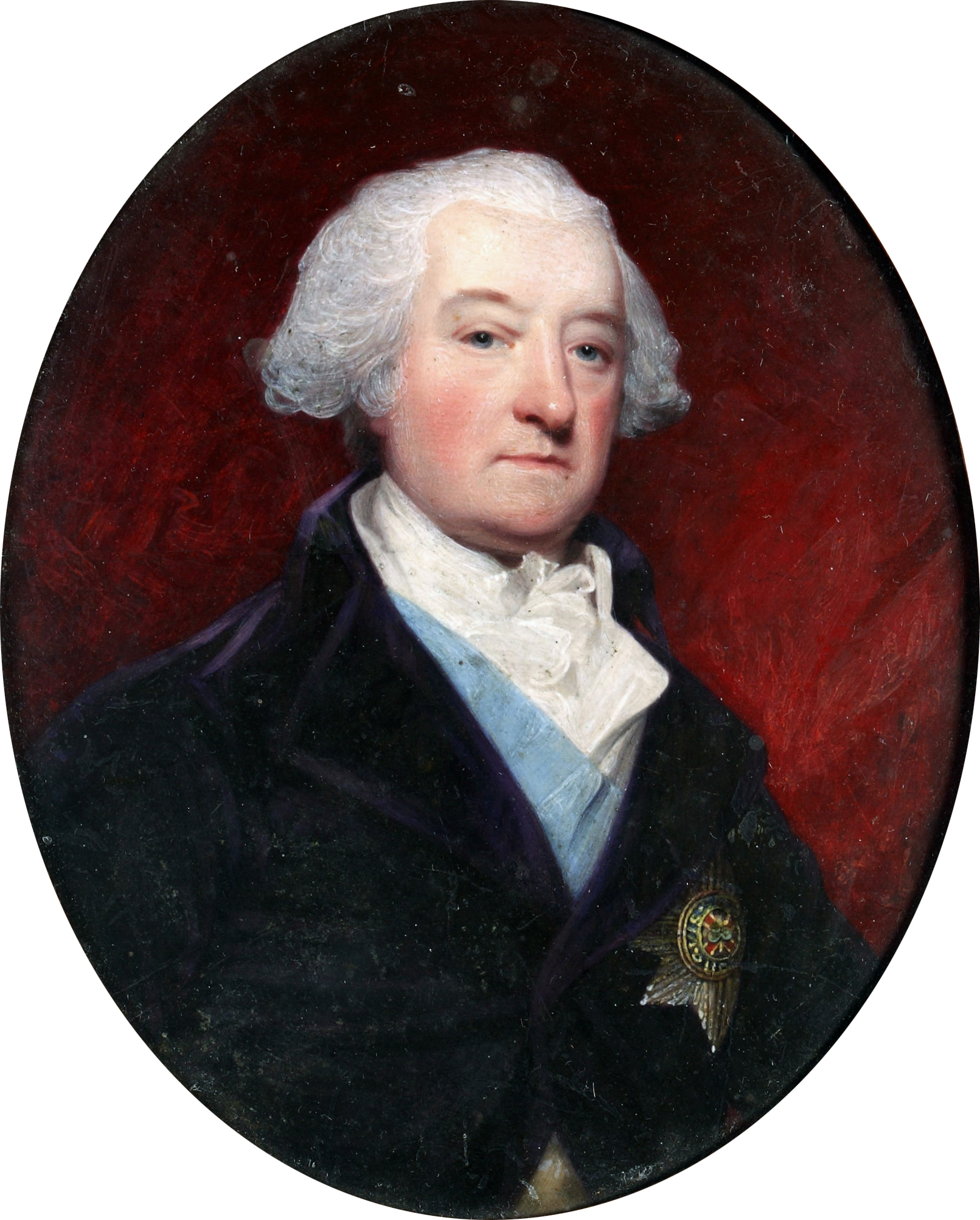
- Portrait by Henry Bone

Member of the House of Lords; as Baron Thomond
- In office 2 October 1801 – 10 February 1808

Member of the Parliament of Great Britain
- In office 1784–1796 Serving with: Charles Dundas (1784-1786); Grey Cooper (1786-1790); Lawrence Dundas (1790-1796)
- Preceded by: James, Marquess of Graham
- Succeeded by: Charles George Beauclerk
- Constituency: Richmond (Yorkshire)
- In office 1797–1800 Serving with John Eliot
- Preceded by: Edward James Eliot
- Succeeded by: George Murray
- Constituency: Liskeard

Member of the Parliament of Ireland
- In office 1756–1761 Serving with Sir Edward O'Brien
- Preceded by: Robert Hickman
- Succeeded by: Francis Pierpoint Burton
- Constituency: County Clare
- In office 1761–1768 Serving with Edward Sandford
- Preceded by: Agmondisham Vesey
- Succeeded by: Garret FitzGerald
- Constituency: Harristown

Personal details
- Born: 1726
- Died: 10 February 1808 (Age 81-82)

Murrough O'Brien, 1st Marquess of Thomond KP PC (Ire) (1726 – 10 February 1808), known from 1777 to 1800 as the 5th Earl of Inchiquin, was an Irish peer, soldier, politician, and Chief of Clan O'Brien.

== Life ==
Murrough O'Brien was born in 1726 to the Hon. James O' Brien and Mary Jephson in Drogheda. James' brother (and Murrough's uncle) was Henry O'Brien, 8th Earl of Thomond, whose heir was Percy Wyndham-O'Brien, 1st Earl of Thomond (c. 1713 – 1774), brother of Charles Wyndham, 2nd Earl of Egremont (1710–1763) of Petworth House.

He joined the Grenadier Guards and was an officer in Germany, where he carried colours at the Battle of Lauffeld in 1747. He retired in 1756 and entered the Irish House of Commons for County Clare in the following year. He represented the constituency until 1761 and sat then as Member of Parliament (MP) for Harristown until 1768.

Because of his support for the Act of Union of Great Britain and Ireland, on 29 December 1800 he was created Marquess of Thomond in the Peerage of Ireland, with a special remainder to his younger brother, and Baron Thomond, of Taplow Court in the County of Buckingham in the Peerage of the United Kingdom on 2 October 1801 (which title allowed him to sit in the United Kingdom House of Lords), but this time with no special remainder. He had a close relationship with King George III. In 1783 he was one of the Founding Knights of the Order of St Patrick. His Irish seat was at Rostellan, near Cork city.

He was a drinker, called a "'six bottle man", and a gambler. He was a keen farmer and oversaw the enclosure of lands around Taplow and mechanisation.

== Marriages and children ==
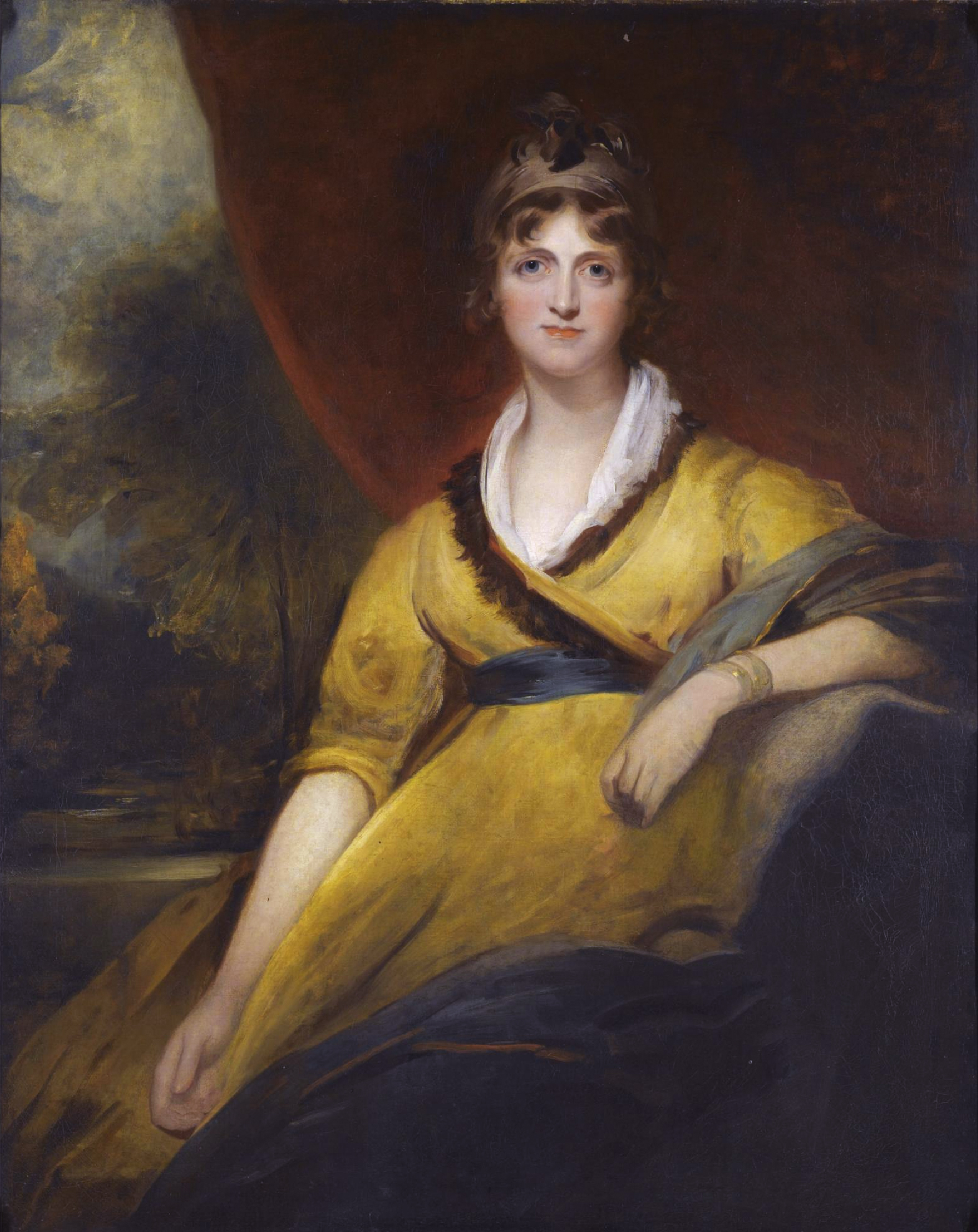
Mary, Countess of Inchiquin (1750–1820), by Thomas Lawrence

He married twice:

- Firstly in 1753 to Mary O'Brien, 3rd Countess of Orkney (died 1790), by whom he had a daughter, Mary O'Brien, 4th Countess of Orkney (1755–1831).
- Secondly on 25 July 1792, to Mary Palmer (1750-1820), heiress of her maternal uncle Sir Joshua Reynolds. They initially lived in Reynolds' former home in Leicester Square.

He also is reputed to have had an illegitimate son, Thomas Carter (1769–1800), who was a composer in London during the 1790s. Thomas lived with Inchiquin at Taplow Court after his return from India in July 1789, and lent the Earl all the money he earned in a benefit concert in Calcutta. In return, Inchiquin recommended Thomas to all his friends as a coal merchant; he had gone into that field after his marriage to Mary Wells in 1793 in order to support his growing family.

== Death and succession ==
He died after a fall from his horse in Grosvenor Square, London on 10 February 1808. The title of Marquess of Thomond passed to his nephew William O'Brien, 2nd Marquess of Thomond. The barony of Thomond became extinct.

Parliament of Ireland
Preceded by Robert Hickman; Sir Edward O'Brien	Member of Parliament for County Clare; 1757–1761; With: Sir Edward O'Brien	Succeeded by Sir Edward O'Brien; Francis Pierpoint Burton
Preceded by John Graydon; Agmondisham Vesey	Member of Parliament for Harristown; 1761–1768; With: Edward Sandford	Succeeded by Garret FitzGerald; Robert Graydon
Parliament of Great Britain
Preceded by George Fitzwilliam; Marquess of Graham	Member of Parliament for Richmond (Yorkshire); 1784–1796; With: Charles Dundas 1784–1786; Sir Grey Cooper 1786–1790; Lawrence Dundas 1790–1796	Succeeded by Lawrence Dundas; Charles George Beauclerk
Preceded by Edward James Eliot; John Eliot	Member of Parliament for Liskeard; 1797–1800; With: John Eliot	Succeeded by John Eliot; Viscount Fincastle
Peerage of Ireland
New creation	Marquess of Thomond; 1800–1808	Succeeded by William O'Brien
Preceded by William O'Brien	Earl of Inchiquin; 1777–1808	Succeeded by William O'Brien
Peerage of the United Kingdom
New creation	Baron Thomond; 1801–1808	Extinct
