= William Graydon =

William Graydon may refer to:

- William Edward Graydon or 220 Kid (born 1989), English record producer and DJ
- William Murray Graydon (1864–1946), American writer

== See also ==
- Graydon (disambiguation)
- Graydon (name)
