= Richard Allen (Irish politician) =

Irish politician (died 1800)

- Died: 22 January 1800
- Occupation: Politician

Richard Allen (died 22 January 1800) was an Irish politician.

Allen was the Member of Parliament for Harristown in the Irish House of Commons between 1776 and 1783.

Parliament of Ireland
Preceded by Thomas Burgh; Robert Graydon	Member of Parliament for Harristown; 1776–1783; With: Maurice Keating (1776-1777); Michael Keating (1777-1781); Charles John Crowle (1781-1783)	Succeeded by Sir FitzGerald Aylmer, Bt; Thomas Burgh
