= Sir Maurice Eustace, 1st Baronet =

Only holder of the Eustace Baronetcy of Castle Martin

Sir Maurice Eustace, 1st Baronet (died 15 October 1693) was an Irish gentleman, the only holder of the Eustace Baronetcy of Castle Martin in County Kildare, which was created for him in the Baronetage of Ireland on 23 December 1685.

== Family ==
The baronet was the son of John Eustace of Castlemartin, of a branch of the old Anglo-Irish family of FitzEustace whose titles included Viscount Baltinglass and Baron Portlester. John Eustace's father Maurice was elder son of William Eustace, whose younger son John (of Harristown) was the father of Sir Maurice Eustace, Lord Chancellor of Ireland. The Lord Chancellor's brother William was father of a third Sir Maurice Eustace (died 1703), who was MP for Knocktopher (1665–6) and for Harristown (1692–5).

The baronet married Margaret (died 1738), daughter of Brigadier Sir Thomas Newcomen of Sutton, Dublin and his wife Frances, daughter of Sir William Talbot, 1st Baronet. His daughters Frances and Maria Henrietta, died unmarried.

== Career ==
In 1686 Sir Maurice was appointed to the Privy Council of Ireland. In the Williamite War in Ireland, the baronet was colonel of an infantry regiment in James II's army. He sat in the Patriot Parliament for the borough of Blessington. After the Jacobite defeat he was attainted in 1691 and the baronetcy was forfeited. Under the Treaty of Limerick he emigrated to France where he died.

Baronetage of Ireland
New creation	Baronet (of Castle Martin); 1685–1691	Forfeit
