= Agmondisham Vesey (died 1785) =

Irish politician and landowner

Agmondesham Vesey, esquire, (1708 – 3 June 1785) was an Irish politician and the second husband of Elizabeth Vesey, one of the founders of the Blue Stockings Society. He was the son of Agmondisham Vesey (1677–1739) and a grandson of John Vesey (archbishop of Tuam).

He was Member of the Parliament of Ireland for Harristown, County Kildare, and Kinsale, County Cork, who held the appointment of accountant-general of Ireland, probably from 1767.

Either during or before 1746 he married his cousin Elizabeth Vesey, daughter of Thomas Vesey, bishop of Ossory. The couple had no children together, and Agmondesham was continuously unfaithful to Elizabeth, although she maintained the façade of a happy marriage. Elizabeth nursed her husband through attacks of epilepsy, but depended for her support upon a circle of female friends. The couple split their time between London, England and Lucan in Ireland, but eventually settled mostly in London at houses in Clarges Street and Bolton Row, Mayfair, where Elizabeth hosted her intellectual salon parties. At these parties entertainment consisted of conversations on literary subjects.

Agmondesham Vesey died on 3 June 1785, leaving his wife and her companion, Miss Handcock, facing relative poverty, Agmondesham having left them nothing in his will despite leaving £1000 to his mistress.

Vesey was a noted amateur architect and contributed significantly towards the design and construction of Lucan House in 1775. On his death in 1785 the house passed to his son George Vesey.

Parliament of Ireland
Preceded by Edward Stratford; John Graydon	Member of Parliament for Harristown; 1740–1761; With: John Graydon	Succeeded by Murrough O'Brien; Edward Sandford
Preceded by John Folliott; Edward Southwell	Member of Parliament for Kinsale; 1765–1783; With: Edward Southwell (1763–1768); James Kearney (1768–1783)	Succeeded by Cromwell Price; James Kearney
