= Harristown (Parliament of Ireland constituency) =

Pre-1801 Irish constituency

- Former borough constituency for the Irish House of Commons
- County: County Kildare
- Borough: Harristown

1684–1801
- Seats: 2
- Replaced by: Disfranchised

Harristown was a borough constituency in the Irish House of Commons until 1800, representing the borough of Harristown in the barony of Naas South, County Kildare.

== History ==
In the Patriot Parliament of 1689 summoned by James II, Harristown was represented with two members.

== Members of Parliament, 1684–1801 ==
=== 1689–1801 ===
Election	First MP	Second MP
1689	James Nihell	Edmund FitzGerald
1692	Sir Maurice Eustace (Note: Expelled in 1695. Nephew of Lord Chancellor Sir Maurice Eustace and cousin of Sir Maurice Eustace, Baronet)	Robert Graydon
1695	Francis Wemys	Robert Graydon
1703	Richard FitzPatrick	Robert Dixon
1713	Benjamin Chetwood	Alexander Graydon
1715	Robert Johnson	Alexander Graydon
1721	Sir Walter Borrowes, 4th Bt	Alexander Graydon
1727	Edward Stratford	John Graydon
1740	Agmondisham Vesey	John Graydon
1761	Murrough O'Brien	Edward Sandford
1768	Garret FitzGerald	Robert Graydon
1775	Thomas Burgh	Robert Graydon
1776	Richard Allen	Maurice Keating
1777	Richard Allen	Michael Keating
1781	Richard Allen	Charles John Crowle
1783	Sir FitzGerald Aylmer, 6th Bt	Thomas Burgh
1790	Sir FitzGerald Aylmer, 6th Bt	Arthur Burdett
1794	Robert La Touche	Arthur Burdett
February 1797	Robert La Touche	John (I) La Touche (Note: Also elected for County Kildare in 1797, for which he chose to sit)
1797	Robert La Touche	John (II) La Touche
1801	Constituency disenfranchised	

== See also ==
- Harristown House, a stately home within the borough

== Bibliography ==
- O'Hart, John (2007). The Irish and Anglo-Irish Landed Gentry: When Cromwell came to Ireland. Vol. II. Heritage Books. ISBN 0-7884-1927-7.
- Leigh Rayment's historical List of Members of the Irish House of Commons. Cites: Johnston-Liik, Edith Mary (2002). The History of the Irish Parliament 1692-1800 (6 volumes). Ulster Historical Foundation.
