= John La Touche (1775–1820) =

British politician

John (II) La Touche (April 1775 – 30 January 1820) was an Irish Whig politician.

He was the son of John La Touche, who had represented Newcastle, Newtownards, Harristown and County Kildare in the Parliament of Ireland and subsequently sat for County Kildare from 1801 to 1802 in the United Kingdom House of Commons.

John La Touche junior represented Newtownards in the Irish House of Commons from 1796 to 1797. Elected in 1798 for both Newcastle and Harristown he chose to sit for Harristown until the dissolution of the Irish Parliament on 1 January 1801 under the Acts of Union 1800.

He was elected for Dublin City at the 1802 general election, defeating Tory MP the Right Honourable George Ogle. La Touche was defeated at the 1806 general election. At the 1807 general election, he was elected in an uncontested poll for County Leitrim, topping the poll at contested elections in 1812 and in 1818.

He was appointed Sheriff of Leitrim for 1808–09.

Parliament of Ireland
Preceded by Hon. Richard Annesley; John La Touche	Member of Parliament for Newtownards; 1796–1797; With: Hon. Richard Annesley	Succeeded by Sir John Blaquiere, 1st Bt; Robert Alexander
Preceded by Robert La Touche; John La Touche	Member of Parliament for Harristown; 1798–1801; With: Robert La Touche	Succeeded by Parliament of the United Kingdom
