= Baron de Blaquiere =

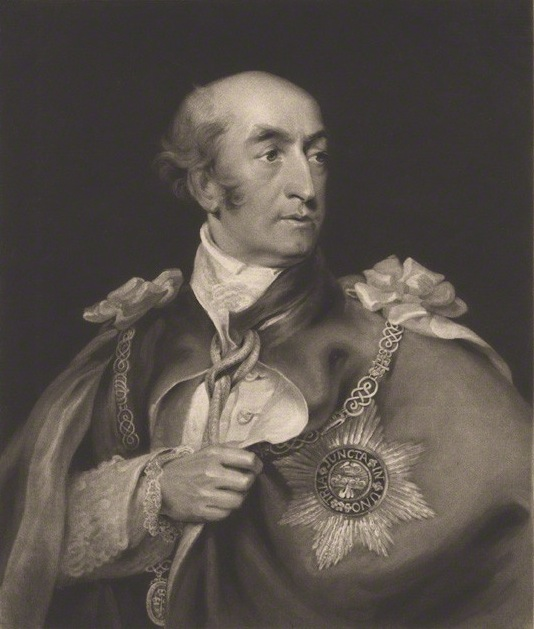
John Blaquiere, 1st Baron de Blaquiere.

Baron de Blaquiere, of Ardkill in the County of Londonderry, was a title in the Peerage of Ireland. It was created on 30 July 1800 for the politician Sir John Blaquiere, 1st Baronet, Chief Secretary for Ireland between 1772 and 1777. He had already been created a Baronet, of Ardkill in the County of Londonderry, in the Baronetage of Ireland on 16 July 1784. He was the son of Jean de Blaquiere, a merchant who emigrated to England from France in 1685. Lord de Blaquiere was succeeded by his eldest son, the second Baron. He died unmarried and was succeeded by his younger brother, the third Baron. He was a general in the British Army. His two sons, John the fourth Baron and William Barnard the fifth Baron, both succeeded in the title. The latter was a Captain in the Royal Navy. He was succeeded by his first cousin once removed, the sixth Baron. He was the grandson of the Hon. Peter de Blaquière, fourth son of the first Baron. Lord de Blaquiere's two sons, John & Alan Boyle were both killed in the First World War and on his death in 1920 the titles became extinct; leaving his widow Lucinne Henriette Adine, the baroness and her daughter Kathleen b.1891 who in 1911 married Hon. Dudley Massey Pigot, of Carleton, the only son of Baroness Dorchester.

The aforementioned the Honourable Peter de Blaquière, fourth son of the first Baron, emigrated to Canada in 1837 and was a member of the Legislative Council of the Province of Canada as well as the first chancellor of the University of Toronto.

Escutcheon of the Barons de Blaquiere

== Barons de Blaquiere (1800) ==
- John Blaquiere, 1st Baron de Blaquiere (1732–1812)
- John de Blaquiere, 2nd Baron de Blaquiere (1776–1844)
- General William de Blaquiere, 3rd Baron de Blaquiere (1778–1851)
- John de Blaquiere, 4th Baron de Blaquiere (1812–1871)
- William Barnard de Blaquiere, 5th Baron de Blaquiere (1814–1889)
- William Barnard de Blaquiere, 6th Baron de Blaquiere (1856–1920)

== Book ==
- Hesilrige, Arthur G. M. (1921). Debrett's Peerage and Titles of courtesy. London: Dean & Son. p. 268.

Baronetage of Great Britain
New creation	Baronet (of Little Marlow); 1775–1822	Extinct
Preceded by Warren baronets	Blaquiere baronets of Ardkill; 16 July 1775	Succeeded by Hunt baronets
