= Graydon (name) =

Graydon is a name. Notable people with the name include:

== Given name ==
- Graydon Eggers (1903–1994), American football coach
- Graydon Henning, Australian maritime historian
- Graydon Hoare, software developer who designed the programming language Rust
- Graydon Nesfield (born 1944), Barbadian cricketer
- Graydon Nicholas (born 1946), former Lieutenant Governor of New Brunswick
- Graydon Oliver (born 1978), retired American professional tennis player
- Graydon Parrish (born 1970), American figurative painter
- Graydon Smith, Canadian politician
- Graydon Staniforth (born 1973), Australian rugby union player
- Graydon G. Withey (1910–1994), judge of the United States Tax Court

== Middle name ==
- Benjamin Graydon Allmark (1911–2004), Canadian politician
- Edward Graydon Carter (born 1949), Canadian-born American journalist and author
- Julia Graydon Sharpe (1857–1939), American female portrait artist
- Michael John Graydon Soroka (born 1997), Canadian baseball pitcher
- Louis Graydon Sullivan (1951–1991), American author and activist

== Surname ==
- Alexander Gradon or Graydon (1666–1739), Irish politician
- Alexander Graydon (1752–1818), American author and officer
- Cliff Graydon (born 1946 or 1947), Canadian politician
- Gordon Graydon (1896–1953), Canadian politician
- Gordon Graydon (Alberta politician) (born 1942), Canadian politician
- Jay Graydon (born 1949), American record producer
- Joe Graydon (1919–2001), American musician
- John Graydon (disambiguation), multiple people
- Katharine Merrill Graydon (1858–1934), American classical scholar
- Keith Graydon (born 1983), Irish football player
- Michael Graydon (born 1938), Royal Air Force air marshal
- Ray Graydon (born 1947), English football manager
- Richard Graydon (1922–2014), British stunt performer
- Robert Graydon (disambiguation), multiple people
- Thomas Graydon (1881–1949), All-American football player
- William Graydon (disambiguation), multiple people

== Fictional characters ==
- Graydon, a character from the 2000 film What Planet Are You From?
- Graydon Creed, a Marvel Comics supervillain

== See also ==
- Graydon (disambiguation)
