= Robert Graydon (1744–1800) =

Irish politician

Robert Graydon (1744 – 1800) was an Irish politician.

Graydon sat as a Member of Parliament for Harristown in the Irish House of Commons from 1768 to 1776, before representing Kildare Borough between 1790 and 1797.

Parliament of Ireland
Preceded by Murrough O'Brien; Edward Sandford	Member of Parliament for Harristown; 1768-1776; With: Garret FitzGerald (1768-1775); Thomas Burgh (1775-1776)	Succeeded by Richard Allen; Maurice Keating
Preceded by Simon Digby; Lord Henry FitzGerald	Member of Parliament for Kildare Borough; 1790-1797; With: Simon Digby (1790-1796); Jones Harrison (1796-1797)	Succeeded by James Fitzgerald; Brydges Henniker
