= Charles John Crowle =

Former British politician

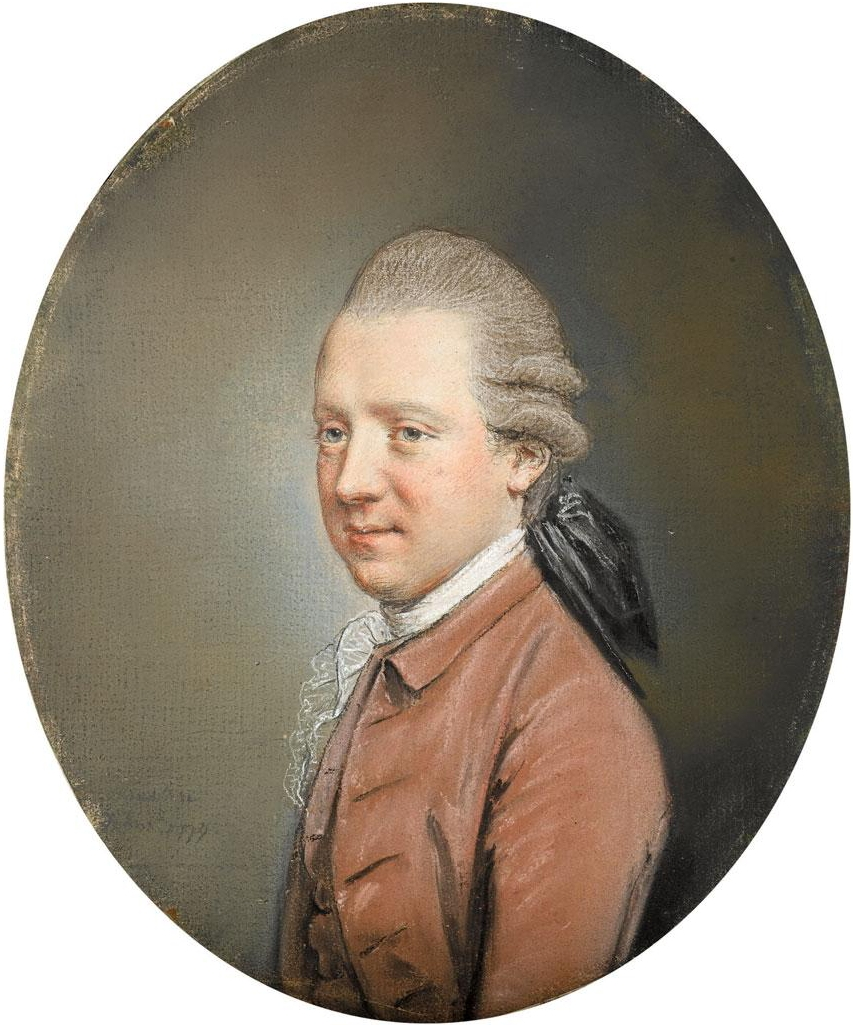
Charles John Crowle

Charles John Crowle (1738 - 1811) was a British politician.

Crowle was the Member of Parliament for Richmond, Yorkshire in the House of Commons of Great Britain, between 1769 and 1774. He subsequently represented Harristown in the Irish House of Commons from 1781 to 1783.

Parliament of Great Britain
Preceded by Alexander Wedderburn; William Norton	Member of Parliament for Richmond; 1769-1774; With: William Norton	Succeeded by Thomas Dundas; Sir Lawrence Dundas, Bt
Parliament of Ireland
Preceded by Richard Allen; Michael Keating	Member of Parliament for Harristown; 1781-1783; With: Richard Allen	Succeeded by Sir FitzGerald Aylmer, Bt; Thomas Burgh
