= John Blaquiere, 1st Baron de Blaquiere =

British Army officer and politician

The Right Honourable The Lord de Blaquiere KB PC FRS
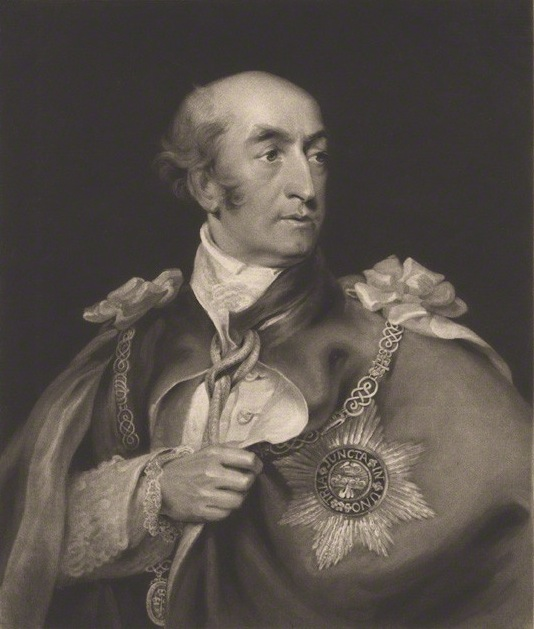
- Lord de Blaquiere

Chief Secretary for Ireland
- In office 1772–1776
- Monarch: George III
- Preceded by: George Macartney
- Succeeded by: Sir Richard Heron, Bt

Personal details
- Born: 15 May 1732
- Died: 27 August 1812 (aged 80) Bray, County Wicklow
- Spouse: Eleanor Dobson (c. 1756–1833)
- Children: 7, including Peter

Lieutenant-Colonel John Blaquiere, 1st Baron de Blaquiere (15 May 1732 – 27 August 1812), was a British Army officer and politician who served as the Chief Secretary for Ireland from 1772 to 1776.

== Background ==
Blaquiere was the fifth son of Jean de Blaquiere, a French merchant who had emigrated to England in 1685, and his wife Marie Elizabeth de Varennes.

== Career ==
Blaquiere at first served in the British Army, in the Dragoons (later renumbered the 17th Dragoons), where he achieved the rank of lieutenant colonel. In 1771 Blaquiere was appointed Secretary of Legation at the British Embassy in Paris, a post he held until 1772. The latter year Lord Harcourt, the British Ambassador in Paris, was appointed Lord Lieutenant of Ireland, and Blaquiere joined him as Chief Secretary for Ireland. He was admitted to the Privy Council of Ireland the same year and made a Knight Companion of the Order of the Bath two years later. He was awarded an honorary LLD from Trinity College Dublin in 1773.

Blaquiere was to remain Chief Secretary until 6 December 1776. He had been elected to the Irish House of Commons for Old Leighlin in 1773, a seat he held until 1783. After representing Enniskillen for a few months in 1783, he sat than for Carlingford from 1783 to 1790, for Charleville from 1790 to 1798 and for Newtownards from 1798 to the Act of Union in 1801. Blaquiere was created a Baronet, of Ardkill in the County of Londonderry, on 16 July 1784, and raised to the Peerage of Ireland as Baron de Blaquiere, of Ardkill in the County of Londonderry, on 30 July 1800, for his support for the Act of Union. Lord de Blaquiere also sat as a Member of the British House of Commons for Rye from 1801 to 1802 and for Downton from 1802 to 1806.

He was elected a Fellow of the Royal Society in 1803.

== Family ==
Lord de Blaquiere married Eleanor, daughter of Robert Dobson, in 1775. They had four sons, including Peter de Blaquière, and three daughters. Lord de Blaquiere died at Bray, County Wicklow, in August 1812, aged 80. He was succeeded in his titles by his eldest son, John.

Parliament of Ireland
Preceded by Sir FitzGerald Aylmer, Bt; Thomas Monck	Member of Parliament for Old Leighlin; 1773–1783; With: Sir FitzGerald Aylmer, Bt 1773–1776; Hugh Massy 1776–1777; Robert Jephson 1777–1783	Succeeded by Henry Luttrell; Arthur Acheson
Preceded by Henry Flood; John Leigh	Member of Parliament for Enniskillen; 1783; With: John McClintock	Succeeded by James Stewart; John McClintock
Preceded by Thomas Knox; Theophilus Blakeney	Member of Parliament for Carlingford; 1783–1790; With: Thomas Coghlan	Succeeded by Sir Charles des Voeux, Bt; James Blaquiere
Preceded by Rogerson Cotter; Richard St George	Member of Parliament for Charleville; 1790–1798; With: Rogerson Cotter	Succeeded by Rogerson Cotter; Charles Boyle
Preceded by Richard Annesley; John La Touche	Member of Parliament for Newtownards; 1798–1801; With: Robert Alexander 1798–1800; Du Pré Alexander 1800–1801	Succeeded by Parliament of the United Kingdom
Parliament of the United Kingdom
Preceded by Lord Hawkesbury; Robert Saunders-Dundas	Member of Parliament for Rye; 1801–1802; With: Lord Hawkesbury	Succeeded by Lord Hawkesbury; Thomas Davis Lamb
Preceded by Edward Bouverie; John Ward	Member of Parliament for Downton; 1803–1806; With: John Ward 1803; Viscount Marsham 1803–1806	Succeeded by Bartholomew Bouverie; Duncombe Pleydell-Bouverie
Political offices
Preceded by George Macartney	Chief Secretary for Ireland; 1772–1776	Succeeded by Sir Richard Heron, Bt
Peerage of Ireland
New creation	Baron de Blaquiere; 1800–1812	Succeeded by John de Blaquiere
Baronetage of Ireland
New creation	Baronet of Ardkill; 1784–1812	Succeeded by John de Blaquiere
