= Sir FitzGerald Aylmer, 6th Baronet =

Irish politician and peer

Sir FitzGerald Aylmer, 6th Baronet (14 September 1736 – February 1794) was an Irish politician and baronet.

Aylmer was the son of Sir Gerald Aylmer, 5th Baronet and Lucy Norris. On 6 January 1737 he succeeded to his father's baronetcy. He served as High Sheriff of Kildare in 1761. He entered the Irish House of Commons as the Member of Parliament for the borough of Roscommon in 1761, holding the seat until 1768. Between 1768 and 1776 Aylmer sat as the MP for Old Leighlin, and he represented Kildare Borough from 1776 to 1783. His final seat was Harristown, which he represented between 1783 and his death in 1794.

He married Elizabeth Cole, daughter of Fenton Cole and Dorothy Sanderson, on 15 September 1764. He was succeeded in his title his eldest son, Fenton.

Parliament of Ireland
Preceded by Thomas Mahon; Edward Sandford	Member of Parliament for Roscommon; 1761–1768; With: Sir Marcus Lowther-Crofton, Bt	Succeeded by Nathaniel Clements; Robert Sandford
Preceded by John Bourke; Edward Nicholson	Member of Parliament for Old Leighlin; 1768–1776; With: Thomas Monck (1768–1773); John Blaquiere (1773–1776)	Succeeded by Hugh Massy; John Blaquiere
Preceded by Simon Digby; Joseph Henry	Member of Parliament for Kildare Borough; 1776–1783; With: Simon Digby	Succeeded by Simon Digby; Lord Henry FitzGerald
Preceded by Richard Allen; Charles John Crowle	Member of Parliament for Harristown; 1783–1794; With: Thomas Burgh (1783–1790); Arthur Burdett (1790–1794)	Succeeded by Robert La Touche; Arthur Burdett
Baronetage of Ireland
Preceded by Gerald Aylmer	Baronet (of Donadea); 1737–1794	Succeeded by Fenton Aylmer
