= Robert Graydon =

Robert Graydon may refer to:

- Robert Graydon (1671–1725), Irish politician, member of Parliament for Harristown, 1692–1693, and 1695–1699
- Robert Graydon (1744–1800), Irish politician, member of Parliament for Harristown, 1768–1776, and for Kildare Borough, 1790–1797
- Robert Murray Graydon (1890–1937), British novelist
