= Rose La Touche =

Victorian lady, student of John Ruskin (1848–1875)

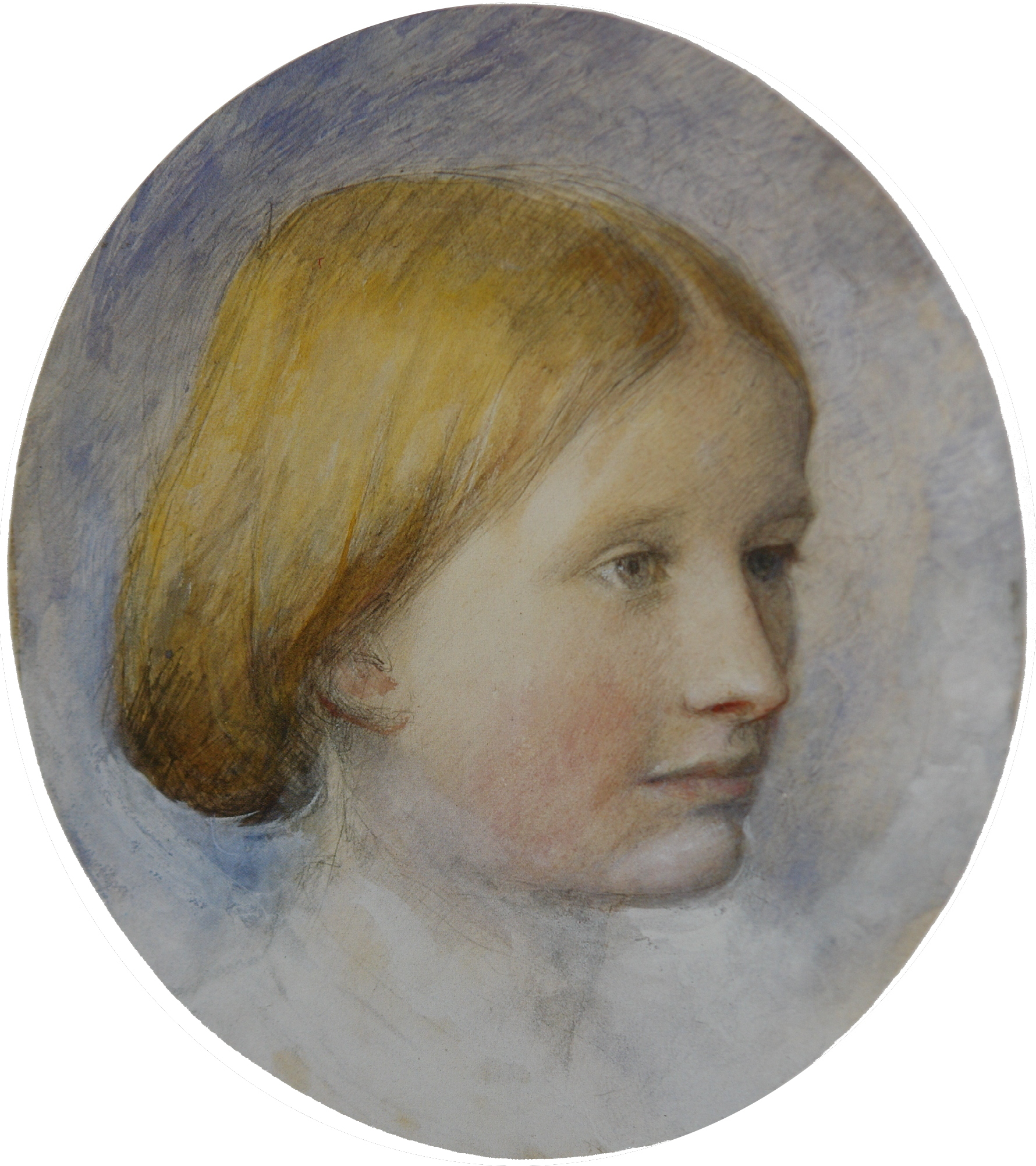
Rose La Touche, 1861, by John Ruskin

Rose La Touche (1848–1875) was the pupil, cherished student, "pet", and ideal on whom the English art historian John Ruskin based Sesame and Lilies (1865).

== Background ==
Rose was born to John "The Master" La Touche (1814–1904), of a Huguenot family which had settled in Ireland and run a bank, and his wife Maria La Touche, the only child of the Dowager Countess of Desart, County Kilkenny. The family lived in Harristown House, County Kildare.

== Introduction to John Ruskin ==
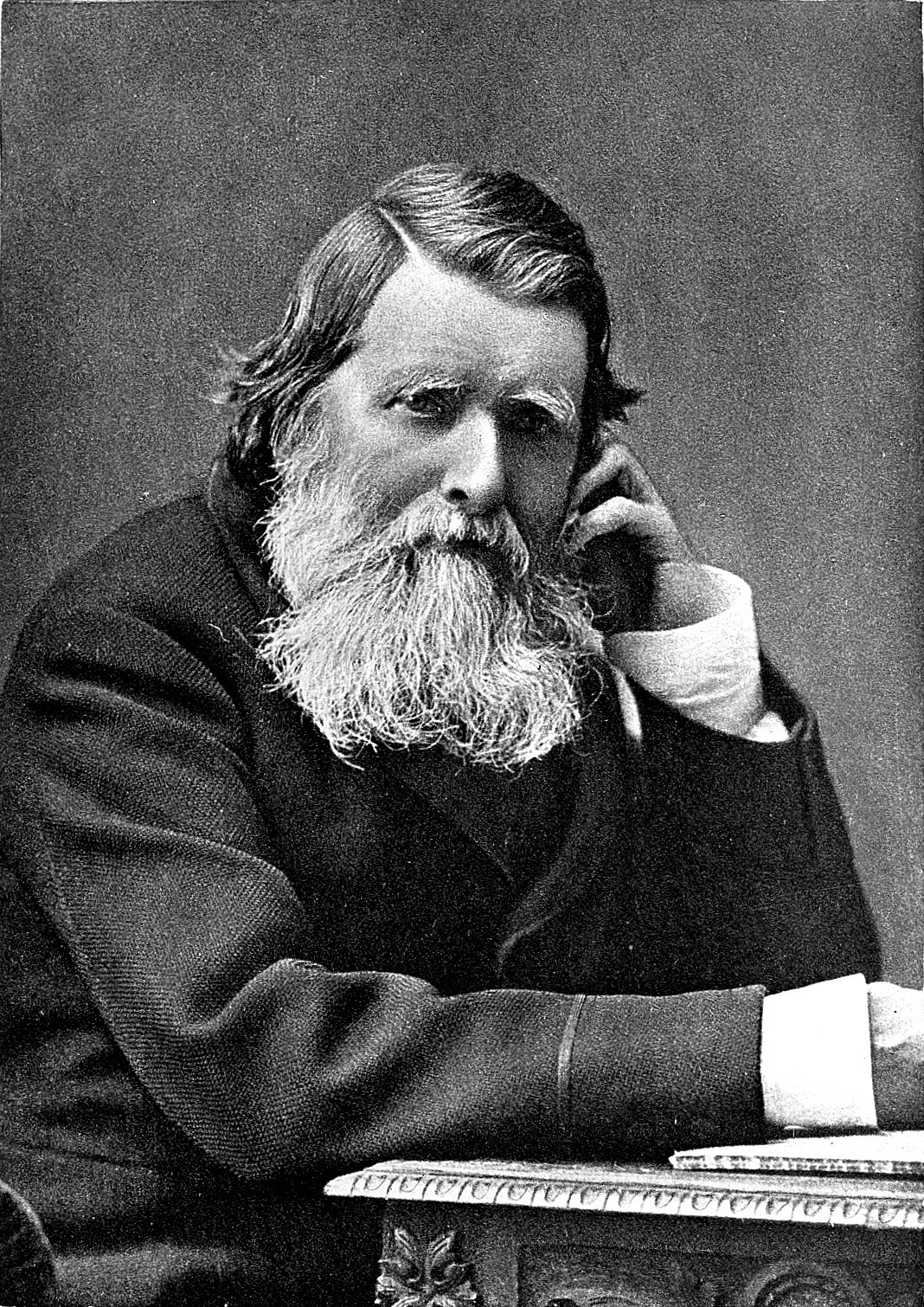
John Ruskin, 1882

Ruskin met La Touche on 3 January 1858, when she was 10 years old and he was about to turn 39. He was her private art tutor, and the two maintained an educational relationship through correspondence until she was 18. Rose's mother, Maria La Touche, had written to Ruskin for assistance with her children's education after a formal introduction from her friend Louisa, Lady Waterford. Ruskin recalls the correspondence in Praeterita:

Soon after I returned home, in the eventful year 1858, a lady wrote to me from—somewhere near Green Street, W.,—saying, as people sometimes did, in those days, that she saw I was the only sound teacher in Art; but this farther, very seriously, that she wanted her children—two girls and a boy—taught the beginnings of Art rightly; especially the younger girl, in whom she thought I might find some power worth developing.

Although some debate exists over the nature of Ruskin's first correspondence with Maria La Touche, Tim Hilton notes in John Ruskin: The Early Years that he did not call as immediately as his autobiography suggests. Rather, "he sent William Ward to see her, being too busy to call himself".

When Ruskin did call on the La Touches for the first time, he was "taken with them" and "felt there was something exceptional about Rose". Upon first meeting Rose, Ruskin wrote in the final pages of Praeterita that

presently the drawing room door opened, and Rosie came in, quietly taking stock of me with her blue eyes as she walked across the room; gave me her hand, as a good dog gives its paw, and then stood a little back. Nine years old, on 3 January 1858, thus now rising towards ten; neither tall nor short for her age; a little stiff in her way of standing. The eyes rather deep blue at that time, and fuller and softer than afterwards. Lips perfectly lovely in profile;--a little too wide, and hard in edge, seen in front; the rest of the features what a fair, well-bred Irish girl's usually are; the hair, perhaps, more graceful in short curl around the forehead, and softer than one sees often, in the close-bound tresses above the neck.

== Childhood ==
She was a high-spirited, precocious, but also very childlike adolescent. Tim Hilton writes that

The Irish girl [Rose] was a puzzle, for she was precocious in some ways and not in others. Sometimes she had a surprising understanding of adult attitudes: at the next moment she was once more completely a child. She had a pretty way of making herself engaging, even coquettish, but could also be rather solemn. 'I don't know what to make of her', Ruskin confessed. '...She wears her round hat in the sauciest way possible—and is a firm—fiery little thing.'

Ruskin's interest in Rose grew into fascination and adoration for his pupil and their interaction consisted of extraordinary amounts of correspondence. In fact, Ruskin's first letter from Rose impressed him so much that he reprinted it in its entirety in Praeterita. Writing

Some wise, and prettily mannered, people have told me I shouldn't say anything about Rosie at all. But I am too old now to take advice, and I won't have this following letter—the first she ever wrote me—moulder away, when I can read it no more, lost to all loving hearts.

The letter Rose writes is addressed "Dearest St. Crumpet"—"St. Crumpet" being her pet name for him—and contains sweet, affectionate, attentive notes about how much she and her family thought about Ruskin during their travels:

I wish so very much that you were happy—God can make you so—We will try not to forget all you taught us—It was so nice of you. Thank you so much from both of us.--Mama is very glad you went to Dr. Ferguson[.] She says you must not give him up. How very kind of you to see & talk to our old man[.] Certainly the name is not beautiful[.] We have all read your letter & we all care for it[.] That was indeed a "dear Irish labourer." Will you give them our love please & take for yourself as much as ever you please. It will be a great deal if you deign to take all we send you. I like Nice, but I don't much like being transplanted except going home. I am ever your rose.

== "Romantic" relationship with Ruskin ==
Although much speculation exists over when Ruskin "fell in love" with Rose, most critics maintain that she was between the ages of 14 and 18.

The author George MacDonald was entrusted by her parents to oversee Rose's welfare during their absence, and he served as a go-between for Ruskin and Rose, acting as their closest friend and advisor. Rose's parents refused permission for Ruskin to marry their daughter and were warned about him by Ruskin's first wife, Effie Gray, whose 6-year marriage to Ruskin had ended in annulment due to "non-consummation".

Ruskin repeated his marriage proposal after Rose became legally free to decide for herself, but she still refused. She was willing to marry if the union would remain unconsummated, as was Ruskin's first marriage, because her doctors had told her she was unfit for marriage; but Ruskin declined to enter another such marriage for fear of its effect on his reputation.

== Death ==
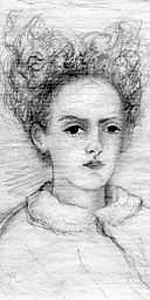
Rose La Touche, as sketched by John Ruskin on her death bed in 1875

Rose died on 25 May 1875 at the age of 27, in a Dublin nursing home, where she had been placed by her parents. Various authors describe the death as arising from either madness, anorexia, a broken heart, religious mania or hysteria, or a combination of these. Whatever the cause, her death was tragic and it is generally credited with causing the onset of bouts of insanity in Ruskin from around 1877. He convinced himself that the Renaissance painter Vittore Carpaccio had included portraits of Rose in his paintings of the life of Saint Ursula. He also took solace in Spiritualism, trying to contact Rose's spirit.

Rose and Ruskin's romance is alluded to in his small tract on education and culture, Sesame and Lilies. According to Wolfgang Kemp "the whole work is riddled with allusions and direct references to the la Touches".
