= Graydon =

Graydon may refer to:

- Graydon (name), a list of people with the name

== Places ==
- Graydon Hall, neighbourhood in Toronto, Ontario, Canada
- Graydon Hill, Edmonton, future neighbourhood in Edmonton, Alberta, Canada
- Graydon Springs, Missouri, unincorporated community in Polk County, Missouri

== See also ==
- Grayson (disambiguation)
- John Graydon (disambiguation)
