= John Graydon (politician) =

Irish politician

John Graydon (1693 – July 1774) was an Irish politician.

Graydon represented Harristown in the Irish House of Commons from 1727 to 1760.

Parliament of Ireland
Preceded by Sir Walter Borrowes, Bt; Alexander Gradon	Member of Parliament for Harristown; 1727-1760; With: Edward Stratford (1727-1740); Agmondisham Vesey (1740-1760)	Succeeded by Murrough O'Brien; Edward Sandford
