= Church of St Michael and All Angels, Millicent =

- Church of St Michael and All Angels
- Millicent Church
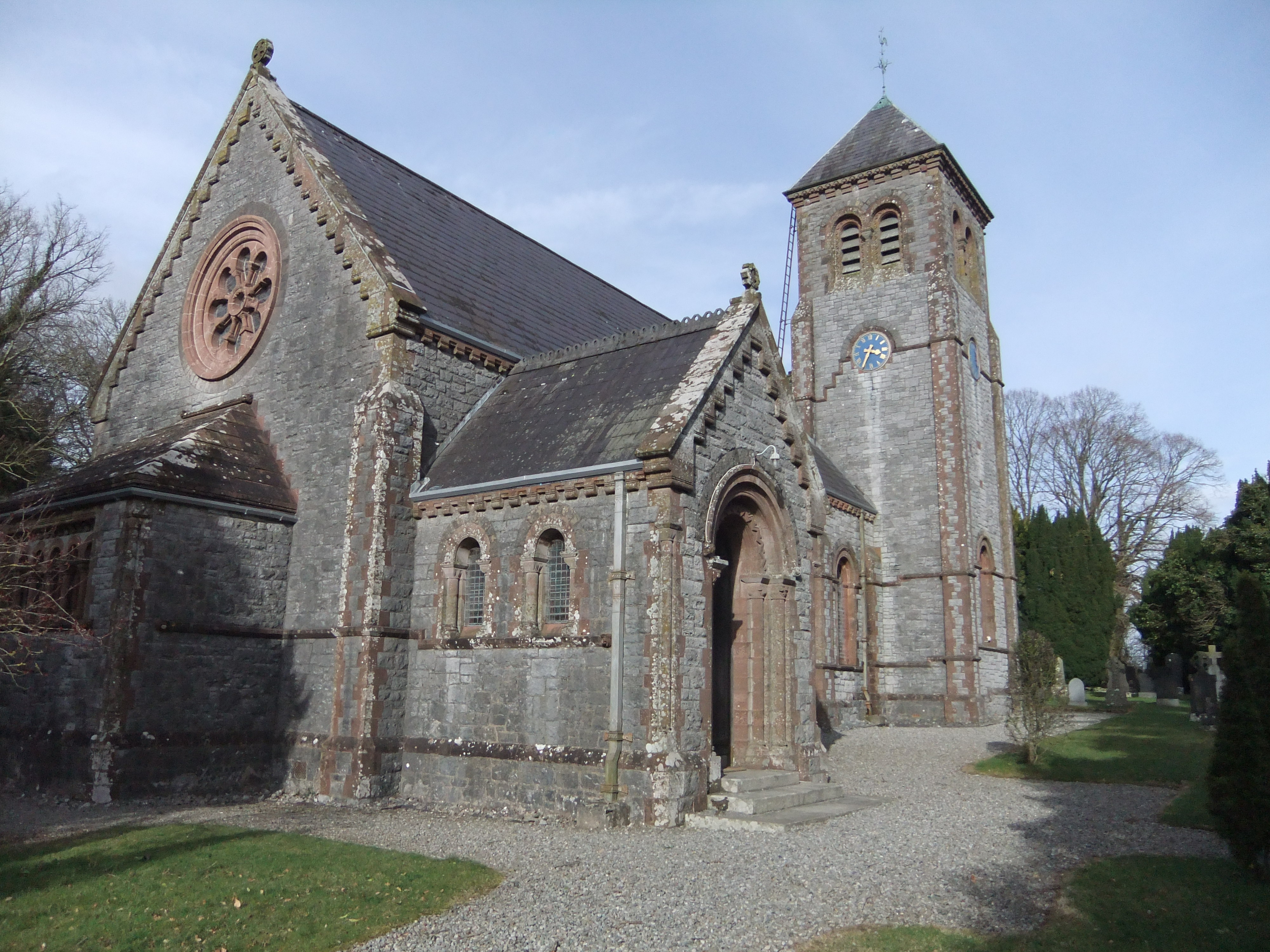

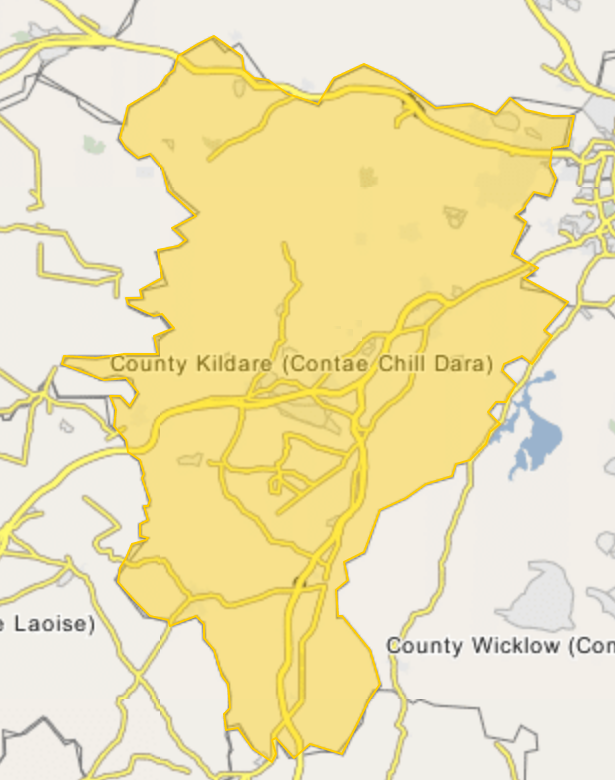
- Location within County Kildare
- 53°16′32″N 6°41′24″W
- Location: Millicent Demesne, Clane, County Kildare
- Country: Ireland
- Denomination: Church of Ireland
- Website: claneunion.org/index.php/millicent/

History
- Status: Parish church
- Founder: Thomas Cooke-Trench
- Dedication: Saint Michael and All Angels
- Consecrated: 29 September 1883

Architecture
- Functional status: Active
- Architect: James Franklin Fuller
- Style: Hiberno-Romanesque, Arts and Crafts
- Years built: 1881–83
- Groundbreaking: 20 June 1881

Specifications
- Materials: Limestone, New Red Sandstone

Administration
- Province: Dublin and Cashel
- Diocese: Dublin and Glendalough
- Parish: Clane and Donadea

The Church of St Michael and All Angels is a Church of Ireland church in Millicent, Clane, County Kildare, Ireland.

== Location ==
The church is located in the Millicent Demesne, 2 km south of Clane and 1.3 km northwest of Millicent House.

== History and architecture ==
The church was built in the 1880s and designed by James Franklin Fuller (1835–1924). It is built of local limestone and New Red Sandstone (Cumberland sandstone).
