= Punchestown Longstone =

- Gallán Bhaile Phúinse (Irish)
- The Long Stone
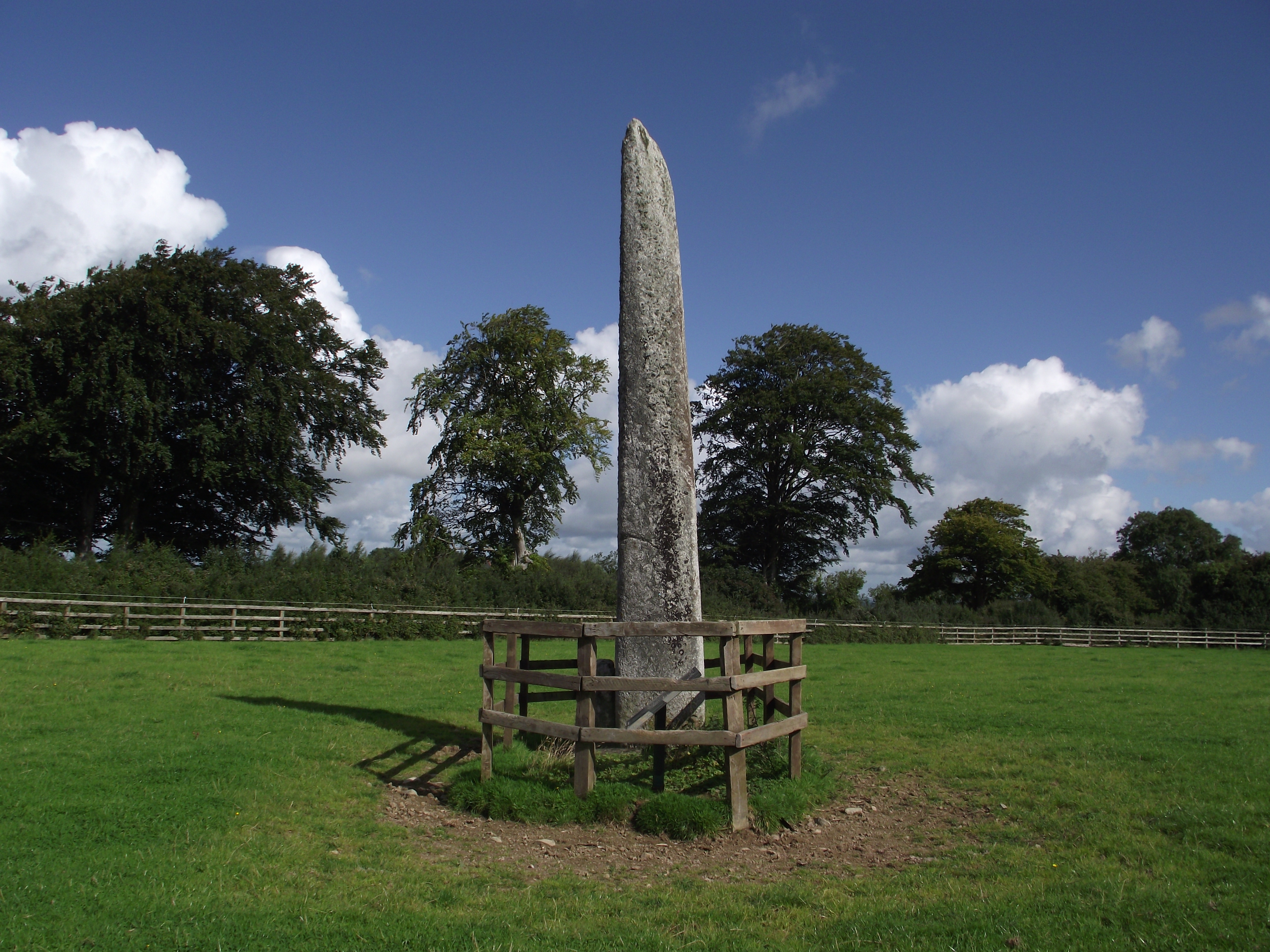

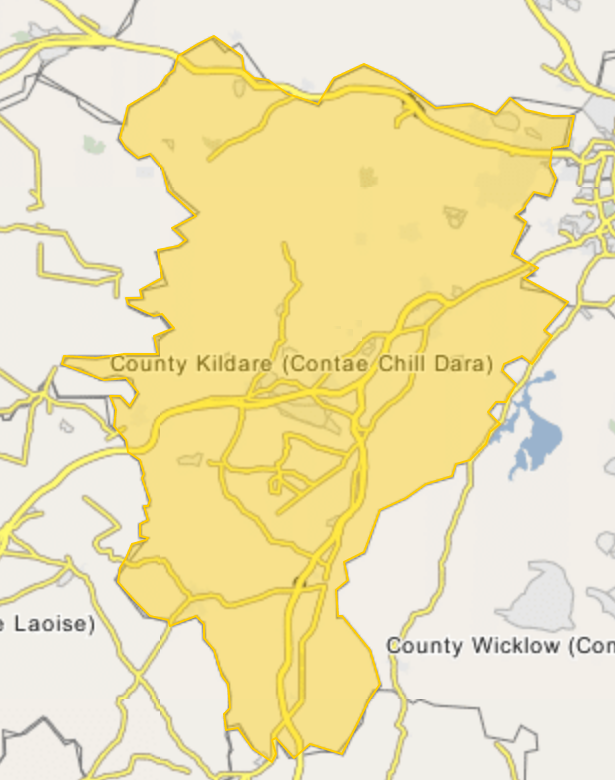
- Location within County Kildare Location within Ireland
- 53°11′31″N 6°37′42″W
- Type: Standing stone
- Cultures: Beaker people
- Location: Punchestown Great, Naas, County Kildare, Ireland
- Part of: Kildare Stones (Giant's Dance)

History
- Built: 2450–1900 BC

Site notes
- Material: Granite
- Height: 6.4 m (21 ft)
- Circumference: 3.3 m (11 ft) at base
- Owner: State
- Public access: Yes

Designations
- Designation: National Monument

Punchestown Longstone is a menhir (standing stone) and national monument near Naas in Ireland.

== Location ==
The Longstone is located about 3.5 km (2 mi) southeast of Naas, and about 600 m north of Punchestown Racecourse, in a field just off the Craddockstown road.

== History and archaeology ==
The nearby Longstone at Forenaghts Great also had a trapezoidal cist which contained cremated human remains, pottery, and a fragment of a wristguard, a typical Beaker find. This suggests the Forenaghts Great Stone was erected in the period 2450–1900 BC when Beaker was in use in Ireland. The Punchestown Longstone probably dates to the same time. In 1981, a Bronze Age cist burial containing the cremated remains of four people were found 700 m (800 yd) east of the Longstone.-

The stone (and several others nearby) are mentioned in Gerald of Wales' 1188 Topographia Hibernica:

Latin: Fuit antiquis temporibus in Hibernid lapidum congeries admiranda, quae et Chorea Gigantum dicta fuit; quia Gigantes eam ab ultimis Affricae finibus in Hiberniam attulerant, et in Kildarensi planitie, non procul a castro Nasensi, tam ingenii quam virium ope mirabiliter erexerant.

English: In ancient times there was in Ireland a remarkable pile of stones, called the Giants' Dance, because the giants brought it from the furthest parts of Africa into Ireland and set it up, partly by main strength, partly by artificial contrivances, in an extraordinary way, on the plains of Kildare, near Naas.

— Gerald of Wales, Topographia Hibernica, Distinctio II Chapter XVIII.

The stone is made of local granite; it is almost 7 metres high and weighs over 9 tonnes. Out of around 600 standing stones in southwestern Ireland, this is the tallest. It fell over in 1931, and was re-erected three years later.

== Gallery ==
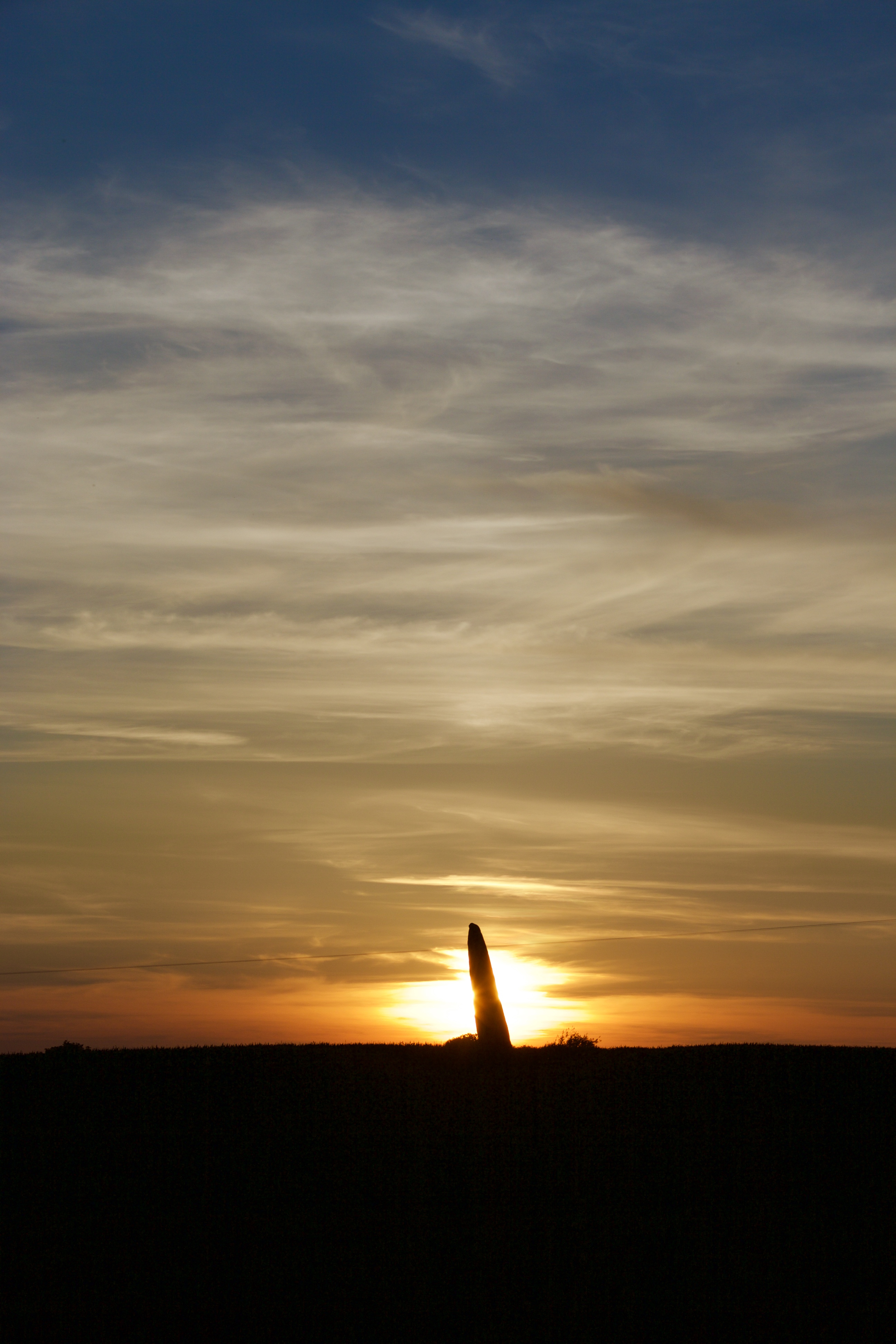
The Longstone in front of the setting sun

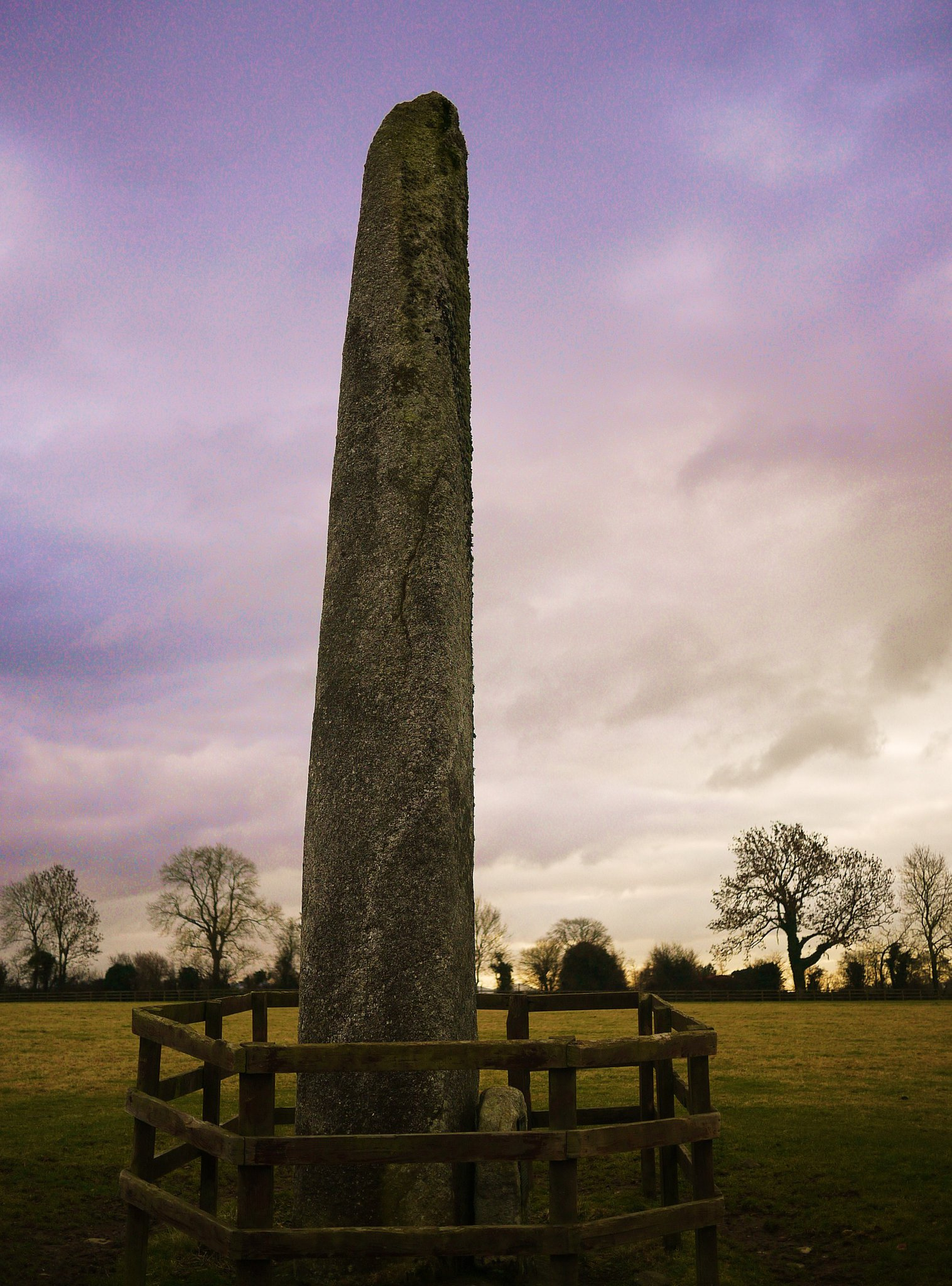
The Longstone

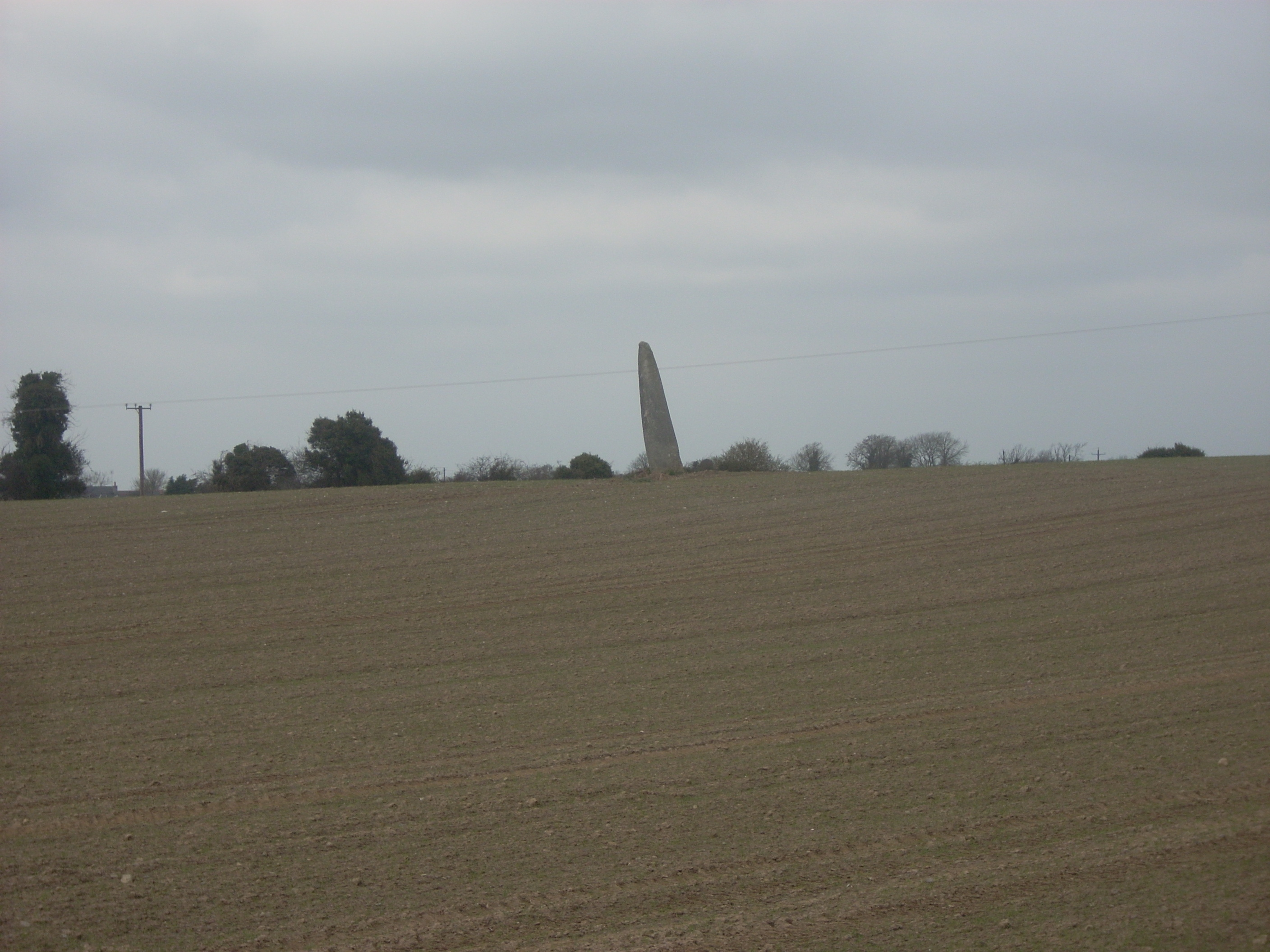
Craddockstown West Standing Stone, an additional stone in the vicinity
