= Grayden, West Virginia =

- Unincorporated community
- Location within West Virginia Location within the United States
- Coordinates: 38°5′31″N 81°3′22″W
- Country: United States
- State: West Virginia
- County: Fayette
- Elevation: 1,591 ft (485 m)
- Time zone: UTC-5 (Eastern (EST))
  - Summer (DST): UTC-4 (EDT)
- GNIS ID: 1554599

Grayden is an unincorporated community in Fayette County, West Virginia, United States. It was also known as Free Union.

The community was named for the local Graydon family.
