= Robert La Touche =

Irish Whig politician

Robert La Touche (October 1773 – 19 May 1844) was an Irish Whig politician.

La Touche was the Member of Parliament for Harristown in the Irish House of Commons between 1794 and the disenfranchisement of the constituency under the Acts of Union 1800. He subsequently represented County Kildare in the House of Commons of the United Kingdom from 1802 to 1830 as a Whig.

He was the son of the politician John La Touche.

Parliament of Ireland
Preceded by Sir FitzGerald Aylmer, Bt; Arthur Burdett	Member of Parliament for Harristown; 1794–1800; With: Arthur Burdett (1794–1797); John La Touche (1797); John La Touche (1797–1800)	Succeeded by Constituency disenfranchised
Parliament of the United Kingdom
Preceded by Maurice Keatinge; John La Touche	Member of Parliament for County Kildare; 1802–1830; With: Lord Robert FitzGerald (1802–1807); Lord Henry FitzGerald (1807–1813); Lord William FitzGerald (1813–1830)	Succeeded by Lord William FitzGerald; Richard More O'Ferrall
