= John La Touche (1732–1810) =

British politician

John (I) La Touche or Latouche (c. 1732 – 3 February 1810) was a member of the Irish House of Commons for Newcastle (1783–90), Newtownards (1790–96), Harristown (1797), and County Kildare (1797–1800). After the Acts of Union 1800 he continued as UK MP for County Kildare in the first UK Parliament, standing down at the 1802 general election in which his sons John (II) and Robert were elected; both had been Irish MPs alongside their father.

John I was the first of the La Touche family to live in the Harristown estate, bought by his father David from the 1st Duke of Leinster.
