= Harristown, Naas South =

Townland in County Kildare, Ireland

Coordinates: 53.1367°N 6.6885°W

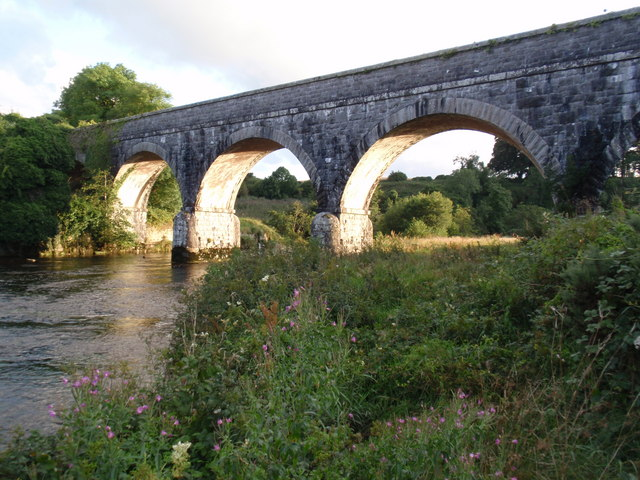
The disused railway bridge which crosses the River Liffey near Harristown. It was used as part of the line from Sallins to Tullow, and operated from c.1885 to 1947

Harristown (Irish: Baile Anraí) is a townland in County Kildare on the River Liffey 2.5 miles (4.0 km) downstream from Kilcullen, just north of Brannockstown in the civil parish of Carnalway in the barony of Naas South. It is the site of a former borough and manor, and Harristown Borough was a borough constituency sending two MPs to the Irish House of Commons before the Acts of Union 1800. Harristown Common is a townland and former commonage north of Harristown proper and separated from it by the townlands of Dunnstown and Johnstown or Dunshane.

Harristown was a part of the demesne of Castlemartin House and Estate owned by the (Fitz) Eustace family, namesakes of nearby Ballymore Eustace. Harristown Castle on the border of the Pale was fortified in the 15th century by Rowland FitzEustace, 1st Baron Portlester. In the 17th century, Harristown House was built near the castle by the Lord Chancellor of Ireland, Sir Maurice Eustace. In 1684 (regnal year 33), Sir Maurice Eustace obtained a royal charter from Charles II incorporating Harristown as a borough. The borough was a rotten borough with "not one house and but one tree inhabiting". Its boundaries encompassed 100 acres whereas the townland as a whole had 618 acres (250 ha). The 1684 charter also established a manor of Harristown, with a court leet, court baron and court of record for 4,000 acres (1,600 ha) of land in the townlands of Harristown, Dunstown, Carnalway, Milltown and others. After Maurice Eustace's death with no son, his estate was divided between three daughters, corresponding to Harristown, Mullacash and Carnalway, the first of which fell to the eldest daughter, Anne.

Anne's son Eustace Chetwood sold the estate to James FitzGerald, 1st Duke of Leinster, and his son William resold it to David La Touche, whose son John took up residence in 1783 in the new Harristown House, designed by Whitmore Davis. Authorised by an Act of the Parliament of Ireland, La Touche enclosed the grounds of the house, building the "New Bridge" over the Liffey to carry the redirected Naas–Dunlavin road (now the R412). Once the borough was disenfranchised by the Act of Union, the corporate officers, who had no functions other than for parliament, were discontinued. The Corporation Book covering 1781 to 1800 is in the National Library of Ireland. In 1906 the Corporation Book from 1714 was in the library of Maurice FitzGerald, 6th Duke of Leinster at Carton House.

In 1837, Samuel Lewis described Harristown as "an inconsiderable village", though there was an Irish Constabulary barracks there. From 1886 to 1947 the Great Southern and Western Railway had a branch line from Naas to Tullow, which had a station at Harristown. The ruins of Harristown Castle were demolished in 1884 to build a national school. Harristown House was partially destroyed by fire in 1891 and rebuilt smaller by James Franklin Fuller.

Historical population of townlands of Harristown and Harristown Common, Carnalway
Townland	1841	1851	1861	1871	1881	1891	1901	1911	1926–2006	2011	2016
Harristown	109	91	87	71	81	81	111	85	No data	78	86
Harristown Common	55	71	70	89	110	86	47	42	No data	11	17

== See also ==
- The hamlet of Harristown, near the village of Nurney (also in County Kildare)
