= Garret FitzGerald (18th-century MP) =

Irish politician

Garret FitzGerald (died 1775) was a member of the Irish House of Commons, representing Kildare Borough from 1761 to 1768 and Harristown from 1768 to 1775.

He was born before 21 December 1740, given that he was over 21 when returned in 1761. He died in Paris, probably in August, in 1775.
