= Richard Dixon (bishop) =

Prebendary of St Patrick's Cathedral, Dublin

Richard Dixon (1540–1594) was Bishop of Cork and Cloyne and prebendary of St Patrick's Cathedral, Dublin.

== Early life ==
Richard Dixon was born in 1540 in Furness Falls, to William Dixon (1493–), who was granted the Carmelite of Cloncurry by Henry VIII in 1544 after the dissolution of the monasteries. His brother, William Dixon (1535–1608), established an estate at Heaton Royds, Yorkshire, in the 1500s.

He was a descendent of Thomas Dixon, 1st Baron of Symondstone.

== Career and deprivation ==
Dixon was first chaplain to Lord Deputy Henry Sidney. Dixon was appointed Bishop of Cork on 6 June, 1570, by the influence of the Archbishop of York Edwin Sandys, his paternal first cousin.

On 16 April 1571, Irish Chancellor Robert Weston, archbishop of Dublin Adam Loftus (bishop), and Lord Justice William FitzWilliam joined in a report to William Cecil, 1st Baron Burghley, advisor to Elizabeth I, that Dixon, despite being a married man, had ‘under colour of matrimony, retained a woman of suspected life as his wife’. He was removed from office on 8 November 1571, for attempted bigamy.

Dixon died at Heaton Royds in 1594.

== Legacy – Knights Dixon and Borrowes baronets ==
Bishop Richard Dixon's only son was Robert Dixon (1573-c. 1598), born at Gledhow, another family seat. His grandson was Sir Robert Dixon (1600–1654), Lord Mayor of Dublin in 1633.

His son was Sir William Dixon (d. 1666), who had two sons.

Sir Richard Dixon (1628–1684), married Mary, niece of Maurice Eustace (Lord Chancellor) in 1662, obtaining Barretstown Castle and an estate at Calverstown, County Kildare. Eustace was Dixon's uncle, having married Cicely Dixon (1606–1678), daughter of Sir Robert Dixon, Lord Mayor of Dublin, in 1633.

Colonel Robert Dixon (d. 1694) was MP for Randalstown. His son Robert Dixon (Irish politician) (1685–1732), was a barrister and politician (ed. Trinity College), called to the bar 1711, became a Kings Counsel in 1716, then Second Serjeant-at-Law. He inherited Calverstown estate from his father.

Robert Dixon died childless, so the estates of Calverstown and Barretstown were left to his aunt, heiress Elizabeth Dixon, who married Sir Kildare Borrowes, 3rd Baronet, bringing to an end "this short but brilliant line of Dixons, famed in the field, the senate, and at the bar".

The Dixon name was added to Borrowes, until Sir Eustace Dixon Borrowes, 11th Baronet (d. 1939).
