= Kildare Borrowes =

Kildare Borrowes may refer to:

- Sir Kildare Borrowes, 3rd Baronet (c. 1660–1709), Irish MP for Kildare County 1703–1709
- Sir Kildare Borrowes, 5th Baronet (1730–1790), his grandson, Irish MP for Kildare County 1745–1776
- Kildare Borrowes (cricketer) (1852–1924), English cricketer

== See also ==
- Borrowes baronets
- Borrowes (surname)
