= Borrowes =

Borrowes is a surname. Notable people with the surname include:

- Kildare Borrowes (disambiguation), multiple people, including:
  - Sir Kildare Borrowes, 3rd Baronet (c. 1660–1709), Irish MP for Kildare County 1703–1709
  - Sir Kildare Borrowes, 5th Baronet (c. 1721–1790), his grandson, Irish MP for Kildare County 1745–1776
- Walter Borrowes (1691–1741) Irish politician
- Borrowes baronets

== See also ==
- Borrows, surname
