= Nathaniel Catelyn =

English-born politician and judge

Sir Nathaniel Catelyn (c. 1580 – 1637) (whose family name is also spelt Catlyn or Catlin), was a leading English-born politician and judge in seventeenth-century Ireland. He was Speaker of the Irish House of Commons in the Irish Parliament of 1634–5, Recorder of Dublin and the first holder of the office of Second Serjeant. Despite accusations of conflict of interest and of Roman Catholic sympathies, he retained the confidence of the Crown and was a key ally of Thomas Wentworth, 1st Earl of Strafford, the Lord Deputy of Ireland.

== Family and early career ==
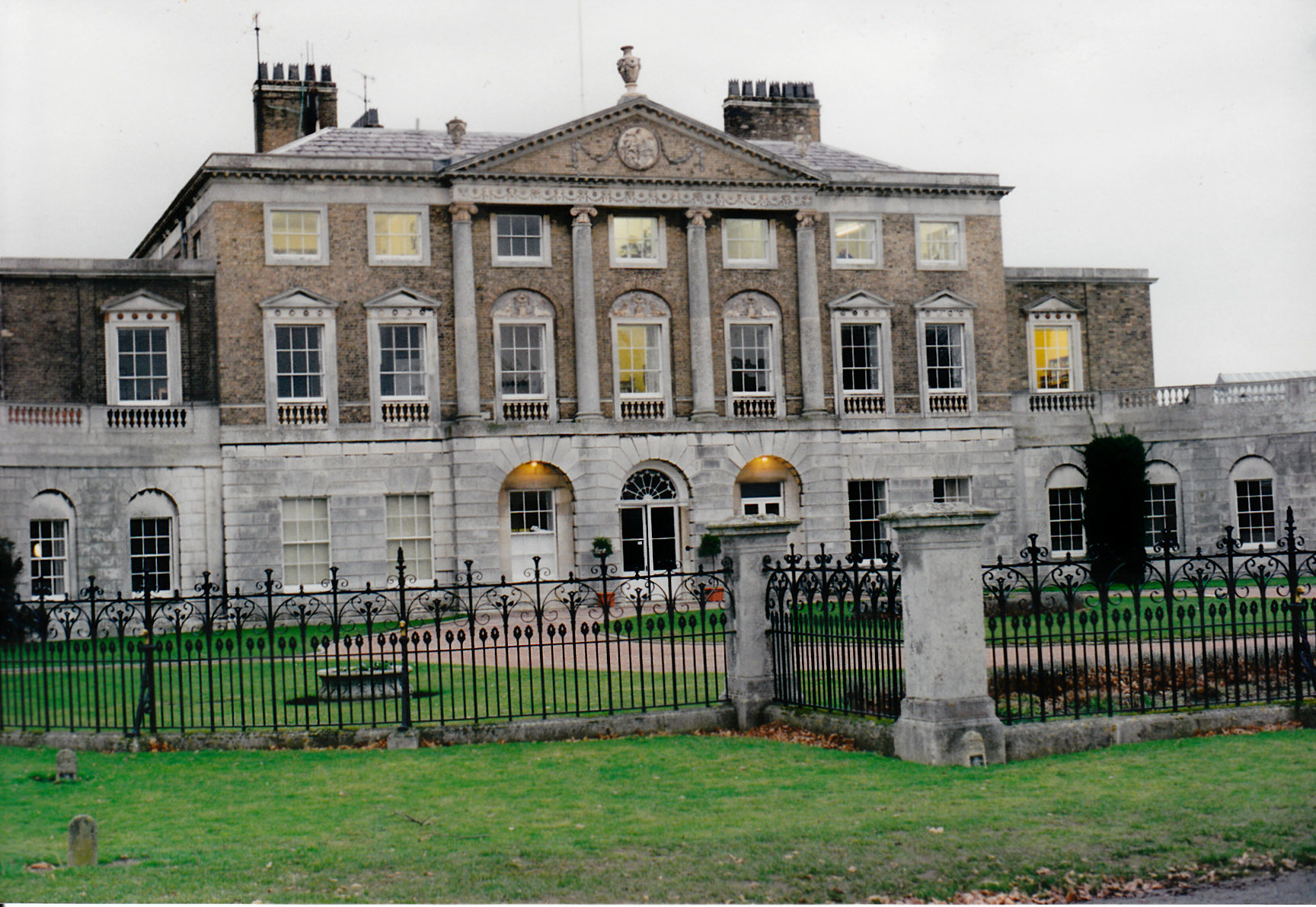
Woolverstone Hall, Catlin's birthplace

He was born in Suffolk, younger son of Richard Catlin III (1547–1596) of Woolverstone Hall, near Ipswich, and his wife, Dionysia, daughter of Thomas Marsh, Clerk of the Court of Star Chamber. He came from a landowning family, who were involved in law and politics, and were long associated with Norwich: his father was a younger son of the lawyer Richard Catlin II and grandson of the MP for Norwich Richard Catlin I. A first cousin was the MP for Norwich Richard Catlin IV and a first cousin once removed was the MP for Norwich Sir Nevill Catlin.

Following admission to Emmanuel College, Cambridge in 1601, he entered Lincoln's Inn in 1605. After this legal training, it seems he planned a career in the Church of England and was ordained a deacon in Peterborough Cathedral in 1620. However he did not proceed to the priesthood and instead went to practise law in Ireland, where he is recorded as a member of King's Inns in 1622/3. He became Recorder of Dublin in 1626.

== Serjeant-at-law ==
In 1627, he was appointed to the new office of Second Serjeant-at-law (Ireland). The reason for this step is unclear but it may have been due to pressure of work on the existing Law Officers: the patent states that the King "understands that it is expedient for our services that we should have another serjeant at law in that our kingdom, of whose diligence use may be made in such causes as concern us". On the other hand, James Butler, 1st Duke of Ormonde (who was only a teenager at the time), said many years later that as he remembered the office had been created simply as a favour to Catlin; in his view, the position of Second Serjeant was "wholly useless to the King and little profitable to anyone".

When the question of precedence was raised, the matter was referred to the King personally. Charles ruled that the Second Serjeant, as in England, should have precedence over the Attorney General for Ireland and the Solicitor General for Ireland, ranking equally with his fellow Serjeant. He was explicitly allowed to retain office as Recorder and in that capacity to act as counsel for the city of Dublin. This double role later did some short-term damage to his career.

== Religious riots of 1629 ==
In 1629, the Crown, having for some years tolerated the open celebration of the Roman Catholic faith in Dublin, decided on vigorous enforcement of the penal laws. On 26 December news came that troops were being sent into the city to prevent the celebration of the Mass; a serious riot developed and a large mob stoned the Anglican Archbishop of Dublin, Lancelot Bulkeley, who had to take refuge in a private house for his own safety. In an effort to calm the rioters, the city fathers denied the troops entry to the city: when the Archbishop, naturally outraged at being put in danger of his life, complained, Catlin, as Recorder, defended the right of the Corporation of Dublin to take whatever steps it thought fit to keep the peace.

Charles I would not tolerate the questioning of his royal prerogative by one of his own law officers, and ordered "the man Catlin's" dismissal from as position of Recorder on the ground that he was a ringleader of the trouble. He was removed from office, but the Lord Deputy of Ireland, Lord Falkland, who was well disposed to Catlin, later ordered the Privy Council of Ireland to hear him in his own defence. He defended himself with great vigour, pointing to the Mayor of Dublin's evidence that he had, as a lawyer, simply acted on the instructions given by his client, and that the Recorder of Dublin, like the Recorder of London, was in the special position of "serving two masters", Crown and City: although he was answerable to the Crown, he was elected by the corporation. The Council accepted his arguments and he was reinstated. The episode did not damage his career in the long run: in 1632 he was commended for his good service by the Lords Justices, and later received a knighthood. The episode also gave him a reputation for being sympathetic to Roman Catholics, and even of being at heart a Catholic himself, which increased his popularity among adherents of the Catholic faith.

== Adviser to the Strafford Administration ==
Under the strong and ruthless regime of the Earl of Strafford, Catlin for three years played a key part in the administration of government. He sat regularly in the Court of Castle Chamber, the Irish equivalent of Star Chamber, notably in the case of alleged maladministration of Youghal College, a key test of Strafford's ability to defeat his most formidable opponent Richard Boyle, 1st Earl of Cork, who had founded the college. In 1635 he was leading counsel for the Crown in the inquisition to establish the Crown's title to lands in County Roscommon and was praised by Strafford for his good work.

=== Speaker of the House of Commons ===
A key part of Strafford's programme was to demonstrate the Crown's ability to manage the Irish Parliament, and for this purpose a compliant Speaker was essential. Strafford chose Catlin as "a very able man and one who will in all things apply himself to his Majesty's service". It has been argued that Strafford also intended to conciliate the Roman Catholic members by selecting a man who, though a Protestant, was generally seen as well-disposed to Catholics. Catlin failed to secure election to the Irish House of Commons. Strafford dealt with this problem in a typically ruthless fashion by summoning the Sheriff of Dublin City, Christopher Brice, who had returned the "wrong" candidate, before the Court of Castle Chamber, fining him heavily and barring him from office for life. The voters then elected Catlin as member for Dublin City. Strafford bluntly informed the Commons that he would reject any Speaker unacceptable to the King, and made his choice of Catlin as the only possible candidate clear. The Commons duly elected Catlin, who managed the business of the Commons entirely in accordance with Strafford's instructions, much to the disappointment of the Catholic members, who obtained none of the concessions they had hoped for.

== Death and family ==
It was common for serjeants to act as extra judges of assize, and Catlin was on assize in Cavan when he died on 5 April 1637. He was buried in the Church of St. Nicholas Within, Dublin.

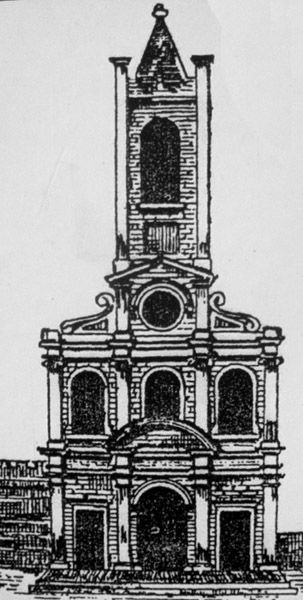
Church of St Nicholas Within, Dublin, where Catelyn is buried.

He married firstly, Maria Turner, and secondly, to Rebecca, third daughter of William Thimbleby of Dublin and his wife Alice Clark, daughter of Richard Clark of Chelmondiston in Suffolk. Both marriages appear to have been childless. After his death Rebecca remarried, as his third wife, Sir Erasmus Borrowes, High Sheriff of Kildare and first of the Borrowes baronets of Grangemellon. Erasmus died about 1650; Rebecca died in 1682.

Political offices
Preceded by Sir John Davies	Speaker of the Irish House of Commons; 1634–1635	Succeeded by Sir Maurice Eustace
