= Viscount Harberton =

Viscount Harberton, of Carbery in the County of Kildare is a title in the Peerage of Ireland. It was created on 5 July 1791 for Arthur Pomeroy, 1st Baron Harberton, who had previously represented County Kildare in the Irish House of Commons. He had already been created Baron Harberton, of Carbery in the County of Kildare, on 10 October 1783, also in the Peerage of Ireland. As of 2023 the titles are held by his descendant, the eleventh Viscount, who succeeded his uncle in 2004.

== Viscounts Harberton (1791) ==
- Arthur Pomeroy, 1st Viscount Harberton (1723–1798)
- Henry Pomeroy, 2nd Viscount Harberton (1749–1829)
- Arthur James Pomeroy, 3rd Viscount Harberton (1753–1832)
- John Pomeroy, 4th Viscount Harberton (1758–1833)
- John James Pomeroy, 5th Viscount Harberton (1790–1862)
- James Spencer Pomeroy, 6th Viscount Harberton (1836–1912), married Florence Wallace Pomeroy
- Ernest Arthur George Pomeroy, 7th Viscount Harberton (1867–1944), married Fairlie Harmar
- Ralphe Legge Pomeroy, 8th Viscount Harberton (1874–1956)
- Henry Ralph Martyn Pomeroy, 9th Viscount Harberton (1908–1980)
- Thomas de Vautort Pomeroy, 10th Viscount Harberton (1910–2004)
- Henry Robert Pomeroy, 11th Viscount Harberton (b. 1958)

The heir apparent is the present holder's son, Hon. Patrick Christopher Pomeroy (b. 1995).

== See also ==
- George Pomeroy Colley
