= Art Óg Mac Murchadha Caomhánach =

King of Laighin (Leinster) 1375 to 1417

Art Óg
- Mac Murchadha, King of Laighin
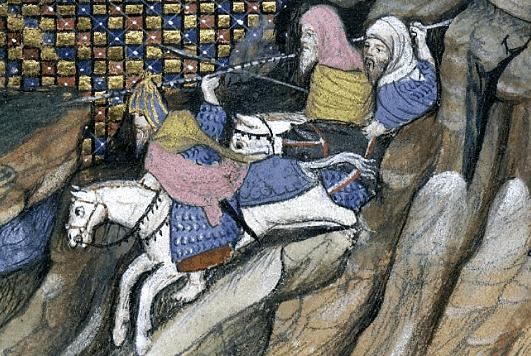
- MacMurrough-Kavanagh riding
- Reign: 1375 – c. 1417
- Predecessor: Donnchadh mac Muircheartaigh
- Successor: Donnchadh mac Airt Mhóir
- Born: 1357
- Died: c. December 1417; Ferns, Ireland or New Ross, Ireland
- Burial: St Mullin's, Ireland
- Spouse: Elizabeth le Veel
- Issue: Donnchadh, Gerald (Gearalt), Diarmuid Lamhdearg
- Art Óg Mac Murchadha Caomhánach
- Irish: Art mac Airt Mac Murchadha Caomhánach
- English: Art MacMurrough-Kavanagh
- House: Mac Murchadha-Caomhánach
- Father: Art Mór Mac Murchadha Caomhánachh

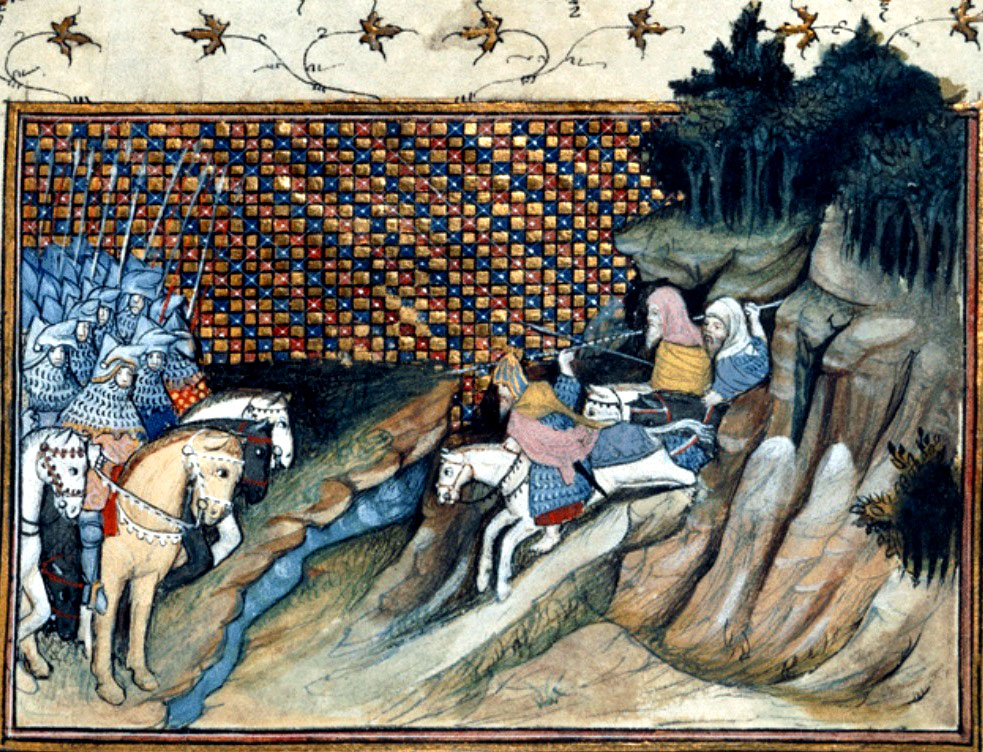
Art Mór riding to meet the earl of Gloucester, as depicted in an illustration to Jean Creton's Histoire du roy d'Angleterre Richard II

Art Óg Mac Murchadha Caomhánach (anglicized Art MacMurrough-Kavanagh and Art MacMorrough; 1357 – c. December 1417) was an Irish king who is generally regarded as the most formidable of the later kings of Leinster. He revived not only the royal family's prerogatives, but also their lands and power. During his 42-year reign, he dominated the Anglo-Norman settlers of Leinster. His dominance of the province and its inhabitants, both Gaelic and Hiberno-Norman, was deemed sufficiently detrimental to the colony that Richard II of England spent much of the years 1394 and 1395 sparring with him. While MacMurrough-Kavanagh did eventually submit to Richard, he renounced this fealty on Richard's departure and made much of his kingdom a death trap for any invading English or Anglo-Irish forces. The Crown accordingly dealt with him cautiously and he was granted an amnesty in 1409.

MacMurrough-Kavanagh was married to Anglo-Irish noblewoman Elizabeth le Veel, widow of Sir John Staunton of Clane and the only daughter of Sir Robert le Veel. Through her father, she was the heiress of the Anglo-Norman barony of Norragh. Such an interracial marriage violated the Statutes of Kilkenny and the Crown thus forfeited Elizabeth's lands, which later became one of the causes of her husband's enmity with the English. They had three sons: Donnchadh, King of Leinster; Diarmuid Lamhdearg; and Gerald, Lord of Ferns. Elizabeth's estates later passed to the Wellesley family, who were ancestors of the Duke of Wellington and descendants of her daughter, Elizabeth, by her first husband.

MacMurrough-Kavanagh died soon after Christmas 1417, perhaps in his bed in Ferns, or perhaps was poisoned in New Ross—accounts differ. The 1885 historical novel Art M'Morrough O'Cavanagh, Prince of Leinster: An Historical Romance of the Fourteenth Century by M. L. O'Byrne is a loosely biographical account of his life, written from a nationalist perspective.

The politician Arthur MacMurrough Kavanagh (1831–1889) was a descendant of MacMurrough-Kavanagh.

== See also ==
- Irish kings
- Kings of Leinster

== Books ==
- Annals of the Four Masters online
- Francis John Byrne, Irish Kings and High Kings (Dublin, 1973), ISBN 1-85182-690-4
- Emmett O'Byrne, War, Politics and the Irish of Leinster 1156–1606 (Dublin, 2003), ISBN 9780713413045
- Gilbert, John Thomas (1893). "MacMurrogh, Art" . In Lee, Sidney (ed.). Dictionary of National Biography. Vol. 35. London: Smith, Elder & Co.
