= Harley Vanston =

Irish Anglican priest

Harley Vanston (1926–2016) was an Irish Anglican priest during a long period in the 20th century and the first decades of the 21st.

Vanston was educated at Trinity College, Dublin. He was ordained deacon in 1948 and priest in 1949. After Curacies in Belfast and Rathfarnham he held incumbencies at Narraghmore and Arklow. He was Archdeacon of Glendalough from 1985 to 1989.
