= Laon (disambiguation) =

Laon is a city in Picardie in northern France.

Laon may also refer to:

- 12279 Laon, a main-belt asteroid
- US Laon, a French association football team
- Laon, a Korean manhwa by YoungBin Kim and Hyun You.
- Laon (deity), a pre-colonial creator deity among the Visayan peoples of the Philippines

== See also ==
- Loan (disambiguation)
- Laona, New York
