= Walter Borrowes =

Sir Walter Dixon Borrowes, 4th Baronet (1691 – 9 June 1741) was an Irish politician.

He was the eldest son of Sir Kildare Borrowes, 3rd Baronet and his wife Elizabeth Dixon, daughter of Sir Richard Dixon and his wife Mary Eustace of Calverstown. He was educated at Trinity College, Dublin. In 1709, he succeeded his father as baronet. Borrowes represented Harristown in the Irish House of Commons between 1721 and 1727. Subsequently, he sat for Athy until his death in 1741.

On 18 March 1720, Borrowes married Mary Pottinger, daughter of Captain Edward Pottinger. They had three sons. Borrowes died at Calverstown, County Kildare, which had come to his mother as the heiress of her nephew, Robert Dixon, and was succeeded in the baronetcy by his only surviving son Sir Kildare Borrowes, 5th Bt.

The family's surname is sometimes spelt Burrowes.

Parliament of Ireland
Preceded by Robert Johnson; Alexander Graydon	Member of Parliament for Harristown; 1721–1727; With: Alexander Graydon	Succeeded by Edward Stratford; John Graydon
Preceded by Maurice Keating; Richard Allen	Member of Parliament for Athy; 1727–1741; With: Marcus Anthony Morgan	Succeeded by James FitzGerald, Baron Offaly; Marcus Anthony Morgan
Baronetage of Ireland
Preceded by Kildare Borrowes	Baronet (of Grangemellon); 1709–1741	Succeeded by Kildare Borrowes
