= Bureau =

Bureau (/ˈbjʊəroʊ/ BURE-oh) may refer to:

== Agencies and organizations ==
- News bureau, an office for gathering or distributing news, generally for a given geographical location
- Bureau (European Parliament), the administrative organ of the Parliament of the European Union
- Federal Bureau of Investigation, the leading internal law enforcement agency in the United States, sometimes shortened to "the Bureau"
- Service bureau, a company which provides business services for a fee
- Credit bureau, an organization that gathers and shares information about individuals’ and businesses’ credit histories

== Arts and entertainment ==
- The Bureau (band), English New Wave soul music group
- The Bureau (TV series), a French political thriller series
- Le Bureau, a 2006 French adaptation of the British television series The Office
- "Bureau" (Brooklyn Nine-Nine), an episode of Brooklyn Nine-Nine
- The Bureau: XCOM Declassified, a 2013 tactical shooter video game

== Furniture ==
- Slant-top desk or bureau, a piece of furniture
- Bureau bedstead, a form of a folding bed that looks like a bureau when closed
- Bureau cabinet, a combination of a bureau and display shelves
- Bureau dressing table, a combination of a dressing table and a writing desk
- Bureau table, a variant of a kneehole desk with drawers
- Chest of drawers, a piece of furniture that has multiple, stacked, parallel drawers
- Bureau à gradin, a writing table with one or several tiers of small drawers and pigeonholes built on a part of the desktop surface

== Geography ==
- Bureau County, Illinois, United States
  - Bureau Township, Bureau County, Illinois
- Bureau Lake, Quebec, Canada

== People ==
- Bureau (surname)
- Bureau de La Rivière (died 1400), trusted advisor of French kings Charles V and Charles VI

== See also ==
- Big Bureau Creek, Illinois
- Borrow (disambiguation)
- Borough
- Burrow
