= Barretstown =

Children's camp in Ireland

- Baile Bhairéid
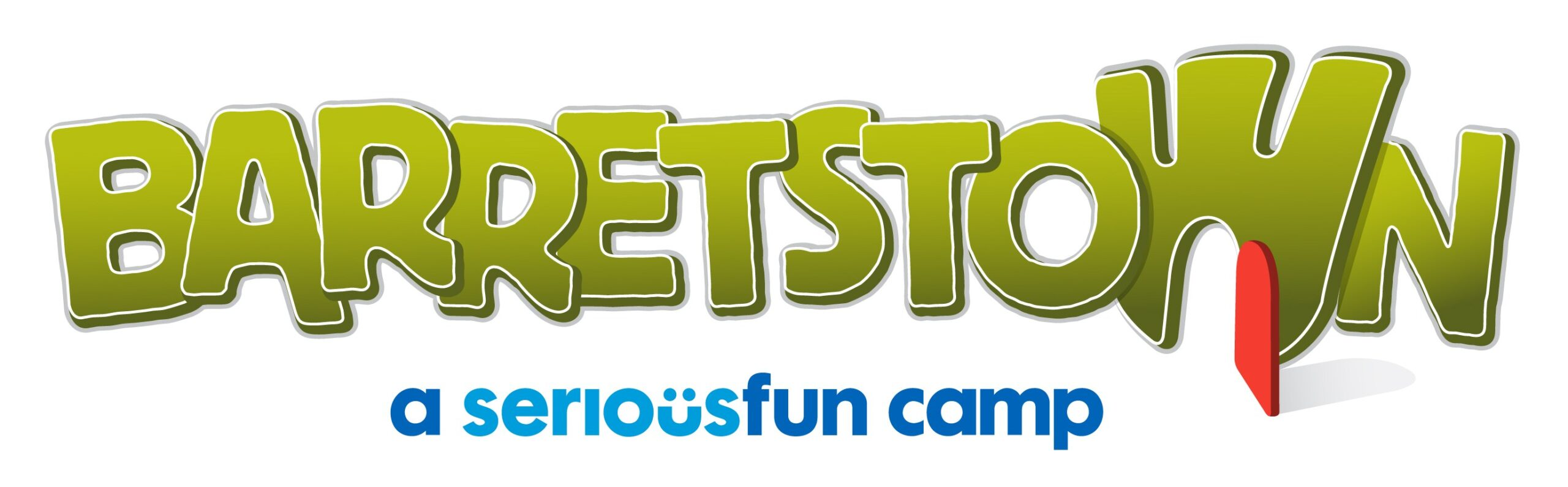
- Founded: 1994
- Founder: Paul Newman
- Location: Ballymore Eustace, Ireland
- Coordinates: 53.153490°N 6.597477°W
- Website: http://www.barretstown.org

Barretstown is a not-for-profit camp for children with cancer and other serious illnesses located at Barretstown Castle, Ballymore Eustace, County Kildare, in Ireland. It was founded in 1994 by Hollywood actor Paul Newman and is a member of the SeriousFun Children's Network of camps across the world.

The children attending, aged from seven to seventeen, come from Ireland and more than twenty other European countries to take part in Activitiesactivities the camp provides such as arts and crafts, Canoeing and outdoor adventure. After successfully overcoming the initial challenge of these activities, the camp says that children stop seeing themselves as 'sick kids' and begin to regain their own inner strength, confidence and self-esteem through therapeutic recreation.

== Aims ==
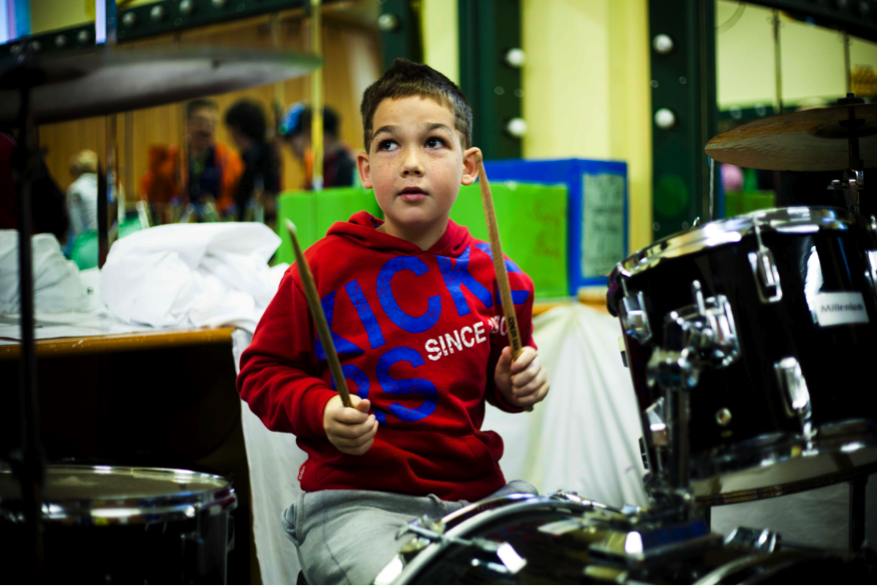
A child at the camp

While hospitals are intended to take care of the physical aspects of serious illness in a child, Barretstown plays a vital role in healing the effects of emotional scars.

=== Therapeutic recreation ===
The programme of therapeutic recreation the camp provides is widely endorsed by many people, leading medical professionals in Ireland and abroad as having invaluable benefits to a child's confidence and self-esteem and is recognised as being a vital part in their recovery from cancer and other serious illnesses.

A 2009 study in the Irish Journal of Sociology by Professor Peter J. Kearney at University College Cork suggests that the Barretstown experience is "a life-enhancing ritual process and an important social experience in chronic severe childhood illnesses." The study describes how the camps' focus on 'Therapeutic Recreation' positively impacts a child with its cyclical model of Challenge, Success, Reflection and Discovery. By getting comfortable in the protected and safe camp environment, the children begin to realise their previously unrecognised potential, through meeting the challenges with success, which has an enormous effect on their confidence and self-esteem.

=== Rebuilding confidence and self-esteem ===
The diagnosis of a serious illness at an early age, and the subsequent lengthy process of treatment and hospital visits are likely to result in a lack of confidence and self-esteem in most children, so Barretstown tries to rebuild their confidence and esteem.

A 2005 study on children who attended Barretstown found that the majority of children noted an improvement in their social skills after attending the camp. They acquired skills such as teamwork, cooperation, and friendship making. The children also reported acquiring practical and activity-related skills through their success in the challenges. They also learnt the importance of having fun and acquired a more positive attitude to their illness as they realised they are not alone and that many other children also have similar conditions. These realisations and developments rebuild confidence and esteem that had been damaged in the children.

== Fundraising ==
Barretstown is a non-profit charitable organisation and provides its services free of charge to all of the children that attend the camps. To do this, they raise €8 million annually to cover their costs. The majority of the money comes from voluntary sources including individual donors, events and corporate supporters. One example of their fundraising efforts is the annual "Big Picnic for Barretstown" which is supported by Avonmore. They also have a number of large corporate supporters including GlaxoSmithKline and Glanbia.

Many of the participants in the annual Dublin Marathon, which takes place on the last Monday in October each year take part in aid of Barretstown as it is one of the marathon's two designated charities, along with Special Olympics Ireland.

== Volunteers ==
Barretstown, like most non-profit organisations, relies on volunteers in order to run its camps. They require over 1200 volunteers annually to help in the provision of camp services. A volunteer in Barretstown is known as a cara, which is the Irish word for 'friend'. The 'caras' play a key role in supporting and encouraging the children to participate in the various activities in the camp.
