= Waleran de Wellesley =

Irish judge

Waleran de Wellesley (died c. 1276) was a judge, statesman and landowner in thirteenth century Ireland. He was a member of the Privy Council of Ireland. He was the ancestor of the Duke of Wellington, and was the first of the de Wellesley family to settle in Ireland.

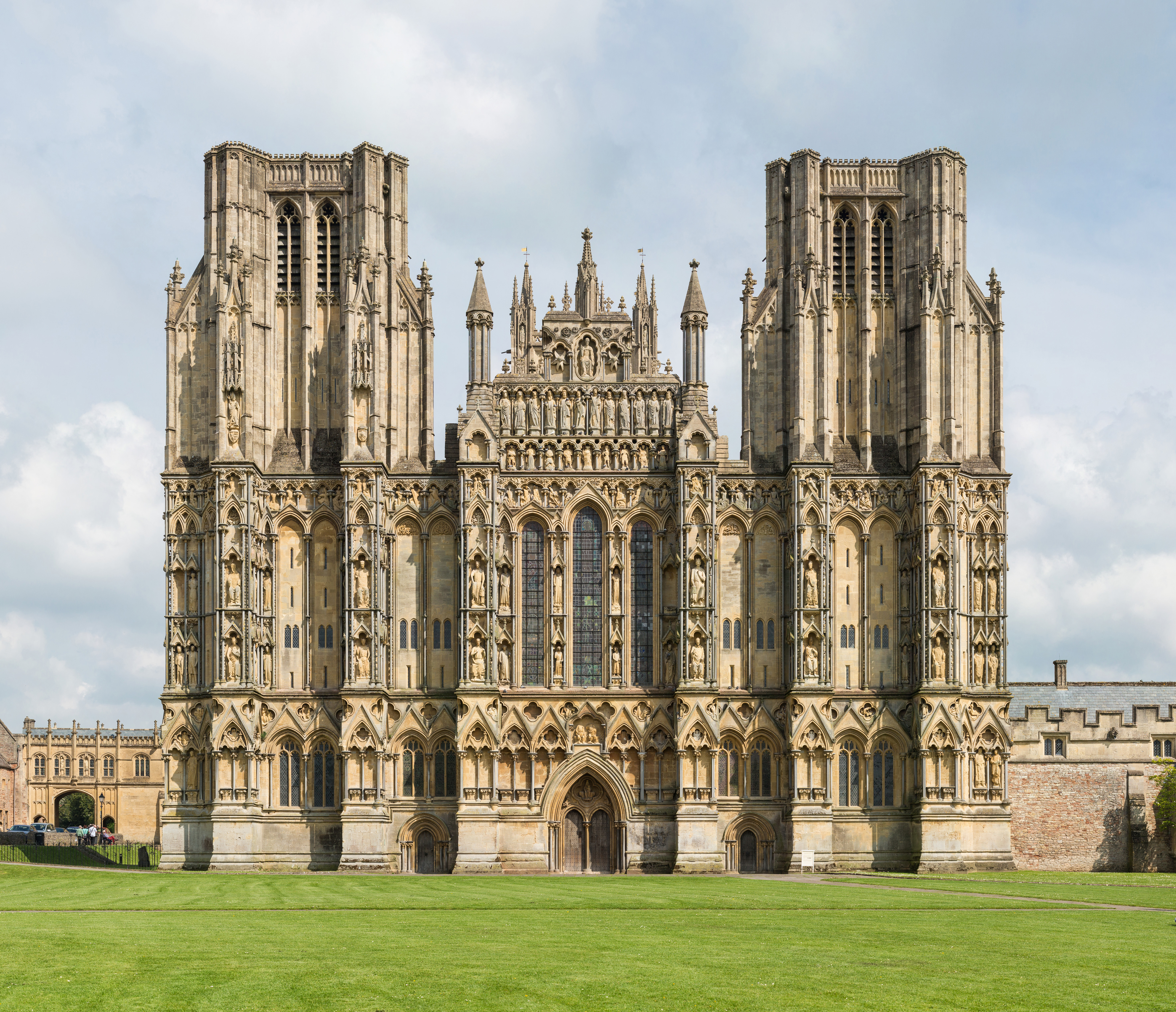
Wells Cathedral

== Wellesley family ==
The de Wellesley family came from Somerset, and took their name from the town of Wells in that county, with which they had a close association (the earliest surviving family record is a charter dated about 1180, now held in Wells Cathedral). The family held the office of standard-bearer to the King, and a Wellesley accompanied Henry II of England to Ireland in 1172 during the Norman Invasion in the late twelfth century, but evidently did not settle in that country. For this military service they received large grants of land in Meath and Kildare.

== Career ==
Waleran was born in Somerset. He is first heard of in 1219–20, when he was engaged in a lawsuit against his mother about her dower lands at Wells. He came to Ireland on "the King's business" in 1226. Between 1242 and 1269, with some intervals, he was an itinerant justice, and became first itinerant justice in 1255; He also served for a short time as a justice "in banc" of the Bench. This may be an early reference to the Court of Common Pleas (Ireland), which is known to have existed in his last years, and was often called "the Bench" in the early period of its existence. In 1257 the English Crown ordered the payment to him of 20 marks for his expenses incurred in the King's service. By 1260 he was a member of the Privy Council of Ireland, in which capacity he, with the Lord Treasurer of Ireland and other councillors, witnessed an important charter that year.

He acquired property in Dublin, and considerable wealth: he granted lands to a priory in County Wexford in 1261. He died about 1276, when he must have been at least seventy, a good age for the time.

== Children and later descendants ==
His son, also named Waleran, was in England in 1284, serving the Lord Chancellor of England. He had an estate at Bryanstown, County Meath. In 1297, on the death without issue of the Justiciar of Ireland, William de Vesci, Wellesley, as tenant, was granted a part of his lands in County Kildare, which had been de Vesci's share of the enormous inheritance of his great-grandfather William Marshall, 1st Earl of Pembroke. He was High Sheriff of Kildare in 1303. He was killed in a skirmish with a Gaelic clan the same year. His father also had a natural son, John Delahyde. William de Wellesley, probably the son of the second Sir Waleran, was appointed Constable of Kildare Castle for life in 1310. He married after 1317 Elizabeth, widow of Walter l'Enfant the younger, Lord of Carnalway, Naas, the Chief Judge of the Justiciar's Court.

The de Wellesleys acquired lands in County Meath and County Kildare, and the titles Baron of Norragh, Earl of Mornington, and ultimately Duke of Wellington.

A third Sir Waleran Wellesley, probably the grandson of the second, was living in 1338, when he received custody of certain lands from the Crown. William Wellesley was granted Carbury Castle, County Kildare and the lands and lordship of Carbury in 1382.

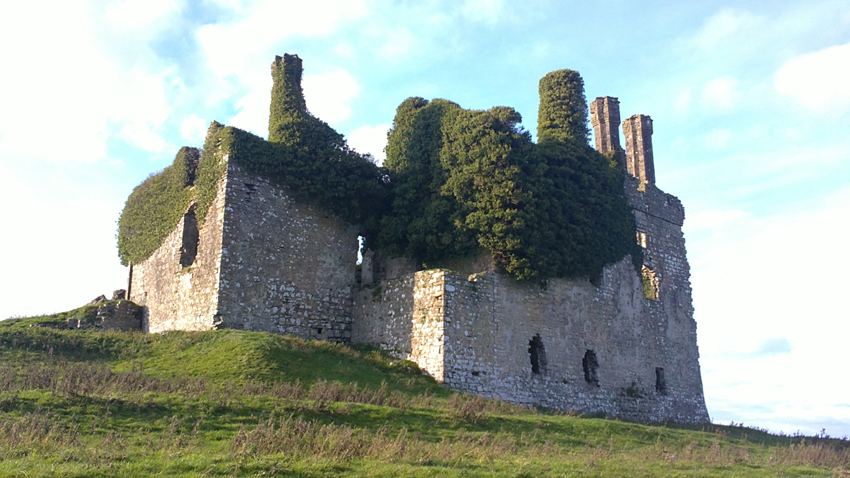
Ruins of Carbury Castle

== Sources ==
- Ball, F. Elrington The Judges in Ireland 1221-1921 London John Murray 1926
- Curtis, Edmund History of Medieval Ireland Routledge Revivals 2013
- Frame, Robin Ireland and Britain 1170-1450 Hambledon Press London 1998
- Longford, Elizabeth Wellington - the Years of the Sword Weidenfeld and Nicolson 1969
- Richardson, H.G. and Sayles, G.O. The Irish Parliament in the Middle Ages Oxford University Press 1952
