= Maurice Eustace (Lord Chancellor) =

Irish landowner, politician, barrister and judge

Sir Maurice Eustace (c. 1590 – 22 June 1665) was an Irish landowner, politician, barrister and judge of the seventeenth century who spent the last years of his career as Lord Chancellor of Ireland. This was an office for which he felt himself to be entirely unfit, and in which he was universally agreed to be a failure.

== Family background ==
Eustace was born in about 1590, at Castlemartin, County Kildare, eldest of the three sons of John FitzWilliam Eustace, Constable of Naas (died 1623). Little is known of his mother, whose name is thought to be Catherine d'Arcy. Of his sisters, one, whose name is variously given as Elizabeth or Elinor, married Edmund Keating and had two sons, Oliver and John Keating, Chief Justice of the Irish Common Pleas, while another, Alice, married Robert Cusack of Rathgar Castle, but was apparently not the mother of his son Adam Cusack.

The Eustaces of Castlemartin were a branch of the prominent "Old English" FitzEustace family who held the title Viscount Baltinglass, but unlike their Baltinglass cousins, the Castlemartin branch of the Eustace family played no part in the Desmond Rebellions of the 1580s, most of them being noted for their loyalty to the English Crown. Maurice in time was to recover much of the property forfeited by his Baltinglass cousins, which remained in the family into the eighteenth century. In matters of religion the family was deeply divided in sympathy; the judge's granduncle, also named Maurice Eustace, was denounced to the authorities as a Jesuit in 1581, tried for high treason, found guilty and executed. The judge himself, though a Protestant, was exceptionally tolerant in matters of religion, to the point of lobbying for increased civil rights for Catholics.

A later Sir Maurice Eustace, 1st Baronet, first and last of the Eustace baronets of Castle Martin, belonged to the same branch of the family, being a grandson of one of the Chancellor's uncles: he should not be confused with a third Sir Maurice Eustace who was the Lord Chancellor's nephew, nor with the Lord Chancellor's natural son, who was yet another Maurice.

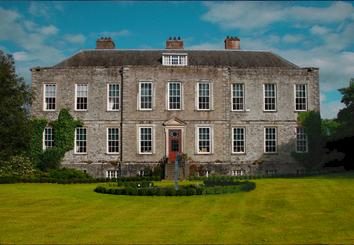
Castlemartin House, the Eustace family seat, present day

== Early career ==
Eustace attended Trinity College Dublin, and after graduating he became a fellow of the college, and its lecturer in Hebrew. In his will, he left a legacy to maintain a Hebrew lecture at Trinity.

However, he had set his heart on a legal career, and after two years he resigned from the fellowship and entered Lincoln's Inn. He was also determined on a career in politics, and he had made a number of useful political contacts through his father, who knew the Lord Deputy of Ireland, Oliver St John, 1st Viscount Grandison, and other senior officials.

He spent some time in England after he was called to the Bar, but he was back in Dublin by 1630. He quickly built up an extremely lucrative legal practice; it was said he could "earn forty gold pieces in a morning". From quite early in his career he aimed at the office of Prime Serjeant.

He entered the Irish House of Commons in 1634 as the member for Athy. Unlike some of the "Old English", he was a whole-hearted supporter of the powerful and formidable Lord Deputy of Ireland, Thomas Wentworth, 1st Earl of Strafford, who in return praised Eustace as a man of integrity and ability, and knighted him.

Their friendship led to a rift between Eustace and Adam Loftus, 1st Viscount Loftus, the Lord Chancellor, who had befriended him and frequently employed his legal services, but who became an implacable opponent of Strafford. Eustace became Prime Serjeant, then the senior Crown legal adviser, a position he had lobbied for over several years. As Serjeant he acted as an extra justice of assize in 1637, at the request of Wentworth, who wished to curb the ambition of the rising barrister Jerome Alexander, who had hoped to gain preferment by acting as an assize judge, but whom Wentworth detested.

In 1640, Maurice was re-elected to the Commons as the member for County Kildare and became Speaker of the House. His formal speech of welcome to Wentworth at the opening of the 1640 Parliament is a good example of his ornate style of oratory, which was much admired at the time:

"Welcome, most worthy Lord, to the new birth of this our Parliament; this is the voice of the House of Commons, and I am sure it is the voice of the whole assembly; it is beside Vox Populi abroad, and I am sure it is Vox Dei".

The Speaker also received a generous salary, which appears to have amounted to a single payment of £3000. In the 1660s and 1670s, Dame Dorothy Ryves, widow and executrix of Sir William Ryves, who had been acting Speaker of the Irish House of Lords during the later sessions of the same Parliament, petitioned the Crown repeatedly for payment of the same amount, complaining that her husband had not received his salary of £3000, whereas Eustace had.

Unlike many of Strafford's political allies, he did not suffer politically as a result of Strafford's impeachment and execution in 1641. Although the "Old English" gentry had come to detest Strafford as much as the "New English" settlers did, Eustace was one of their own, and, though he had quarrelled with Lord Loftus, was generally liked and respected. He remained Speaker of the Commons until 1647; at its final meeting the House voiced its thanks for "the many good services performed by Sir Maurice Eustace their Speaker", and spoke ominously of the "inveterate hatred and malice of the detestable rebels" against him.

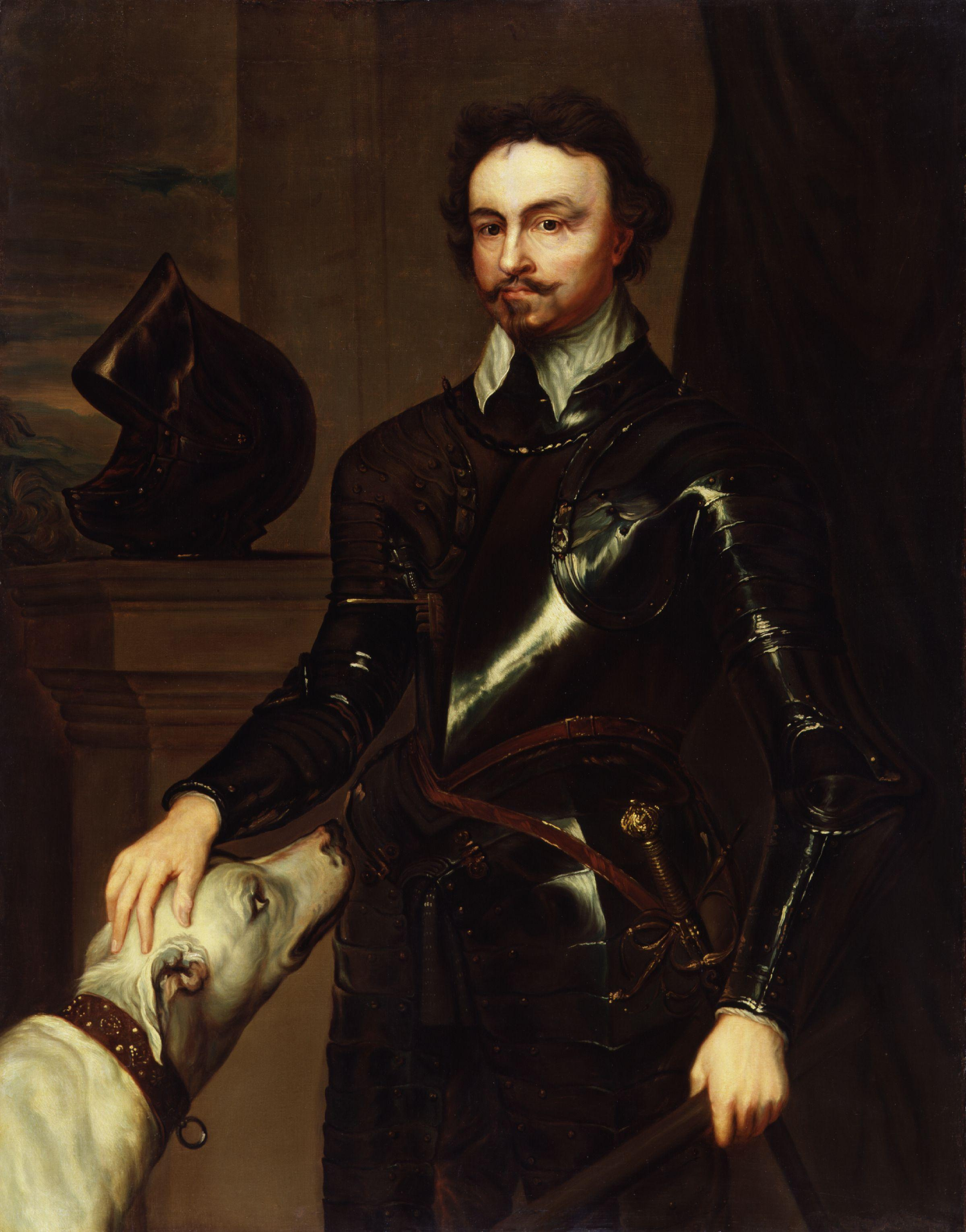
Thomas Wentworth, 1st Earl of Strafford, attributed to Sir Anthony van Dyck

== Civil War ==
So long as Dublin remained under Royalist control, Eustace prospered, despite his frequent complaints about the invasion of his property, the despoiling of his woods and the theft of his cattle. There was also a bitter private feud between the Eustace and Meredyth families, in which there were undoubtedly faults on both sides. The feud no doubt explains the bitter animosity between Eustace and Sir Robert Meredyth, the Chancellor of the Exchequer of Ireland, which reached its height after the Restoration.

He recovered the old family manor of Palmerstown, which had passed, after the Baltinglass branch of the Eustace family suffered forfeiture of their estates, to the Allen family. In 1643, being known as a man who had some sympathy for the plight of Irish Roman Catholics, most of whom he thought would lay down their weapons if promised a pardon, he was sent to negotiate with the Irish Confederacy at Kilkenny. He was Escheator of Leinster (which was still a substantive office, not the sinecure it later became) in 1644. He obtained the reversion to the office of Master of the Rolls in Ireland, and acquired land at Athy and Cong (he was dispossessed of his lands at Cong after the Restoration, much to the amusement of his political opponents). In 1647, however, the Marquis of Ormonde surrendered Dublin to the Parliamentary forces. Eustace was arrested soon afterwards and sent to Chester Castle where he remained for seven years. His confinement cannot have been very strict, as he formed an extra-marital relationship with a lady (whose name is not known) which produced two children. He and his children's mother, who is said to have been a person of a good family, were still on friendly terms in the 1660s.

On his release, he returned to Dublin. He was re-arrested, and briefly imprisoned, on suspicion of corresponding with Charles II, but was quickly released and allowed to resume practice at the Bar. His loyalty to the Stuart dynasty was never in serious doubt, and it is likely that he was kept under some degree of surveillance. At the same time, he enjoyed the goodwill of Henry Cromwell, who spoke of him as an eminent lawyer "to whom I am beholden and owe a kindness". Precisely what service Eustace had performed for Cromwell is unclear.

== Restoration ==
At the Restoration, Eustace's unquestioned loyalty to the Crown, combined with his legal and political experience, made him on the face of it a man who was ideally suited to high office; in addition, he was personally close to the Duke of Ormonde, who would do anything to help a friend. Accordingly, he was appointed Lord Chancellor of Ireland and a Lord Justice of Ireland, exercising the powers of the Lord Lieutenant in his absence, jointly with Charles Coote, 1st Earl of Mountrath and Roger Boyle, 1st Earl of Orrery. He accepted a peerage but later changed his mind, presumably because he had no legitimate son to inherit it.

Ironically the only serious objection to his appointment came from Eustace himself. He was increasingly drawn to country life and had looked forward to his retirement to his beloved country seat Harristown Castle, which he was rebuilding after the damage it had suffered during the Civil War, and which by the time of his death was considered to be one of the finest houses in Ireland. Also he honestly doubted if his age and ill-health fitted him for high office. He wrote pathetically to the Secretary of State:

"I ... am now grown too old to perform any public service. I desire no such post nor any favour except to remain in his Majesty's good opinion. I hope I shall not now be put beyond my strength with any public employment ".

=== Lord Justice of Ireland ===
As Lord Justice, Eustace was embroiled in the bitter disputes (which led to the passing of the Act of Settlement 1662) between the mainly Roman Catholic Royalists who had been dispossessed in the Cromwellian Settlement of 1652, and the Parliamentarian newcomers who had bought their estates. Eustace by birth was a member of the dispossessed class and identified himself entirely with its interests; and though he was himself a Protestant he believed firmly in equal rights for Roman Catholics. This put him at odds with his fellow Lords Justices, Mountrath (until his death at the end of 1661) and Orrery: they were firm supporters of the Cromwellians, whom Eustace regarded as criminals, and in his view, they were both implacably hostile to the Catholics. In his private correspondence with Ormonde, he denounced his fellow Lords Justices with such venom that Ormonde in reply urged him to show more discretion. He suffered a personal defeat when he failed, despite strenuous efforts, to prevent his old enemy Sir Robert Meredyth from being reappointed Chancellor of the Exchequer, though he came very close to success.

Eustace did obtain some concessions for the Royalists in the Act of Settlement, but the struggle exhausted him and he was thankful when Ormonde's arrival in Dublin in 1662 allowed him to resign as Lord Justice. Always a shrewd man of business, Eustace was careful to get a private Act of the Irish Parliament passed to confirm his right to his estates, except Cong, which the Court of Claims returned to its original Catholic owners, much to the amusement of his enemies, who gleefully pointed to his constant lectures on the rights of Catholic landowners.

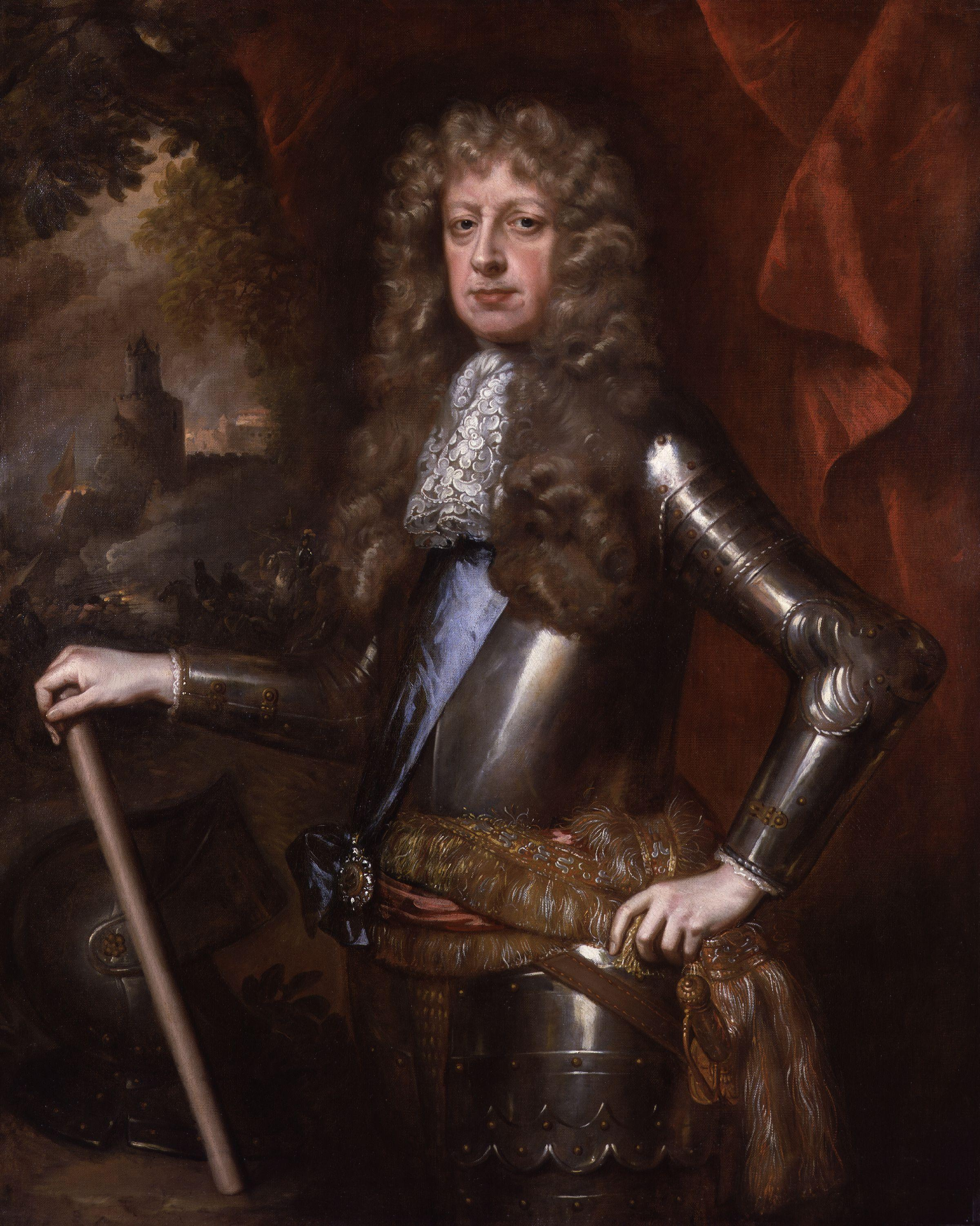
James Butler, 1st Duke of Ormonde by William Wissing

== Lord Chancellor of Ireland ==
Eustace's prediction that he would be a failure as Lord Chancellor was by general agreement amply fulfilled: political struggles, physical illness, frequent bouts of depression and family troubles almost incapacitated him in the last years of his life. He was also discouraged by the failure of his well-meant efforts to ensure religious toleration for Roman Catholics: Ormonde, though he was personally tolerant enough in matters of religion, would give him no support in this, having settled on a policy of simply turning a blind eye to the practice of the Catholic faith in so far as this was possible. He refused to let Eustace permit Catholic barristers to plead in his Court or to be appointed to Commissions for the Peace, and gave him the sensible advice that he should not worry about what he could not change.

In 1663 Eustace appears to have had a nervous breakdown, which left him completely unable to perform his duties for a time. By this time, a number of complaints about Eustace's unfitness for office had reached the English Lord Chancellor, Edward Hyde, 1st Earl of Clarendon, who had not been consulted about Eustace's appointment, since Ormonde had been given full powers to appoint the Irish judges. Clarendon, who had an extremely low opinion of Eustace's abilities, wrote to Ormonde that he should either do the honourable thing by resigning or be dismissed. Ormonde was always loyal, perhaps to a fault, to his old friends: Elrington Ball remarks that those whom he had ever loved, he would love to the end. He did not defend Eustace's conduct as a judge, but pointed to his long record of loyalty to the English Crown and suggested that dismissal would be a poor reward for it. In the event, it proved very difficult to find a suitable replacement as Chancellor and the question of Eustace's dismissal was still pending when he died. His death did not resolve the problem of finding a suitable replacement, and for the last time it was decided to appoint a senior cleric, Michael Boyle, Archbishop of Armagh, as Lord Chancellor. Ironically Boyle, a non-lawyer, was generally considered to be a better chancellor than Eustace, as his conscientious devotion to duty made up for his lack of legal training.

== Heirs ==
Eustace had always been an acute man of business, and despite his professional troubles he continued to prosper financially, recovering most of the Eustace estates forfeited by the Baltinglass branch of the family (some of which he returned to dispossessed Catholic cousins), and amassing a fortune which was reckoned to be between sixty and eighty thousand pounds (making him a multi-millionaire by modern standards). He owned lands in several counties and did much to improve the town of Baltinglass. He regained the family's Palmerstown estate, and bought lands at Chapelizod, which later became part of Phoenix Park.

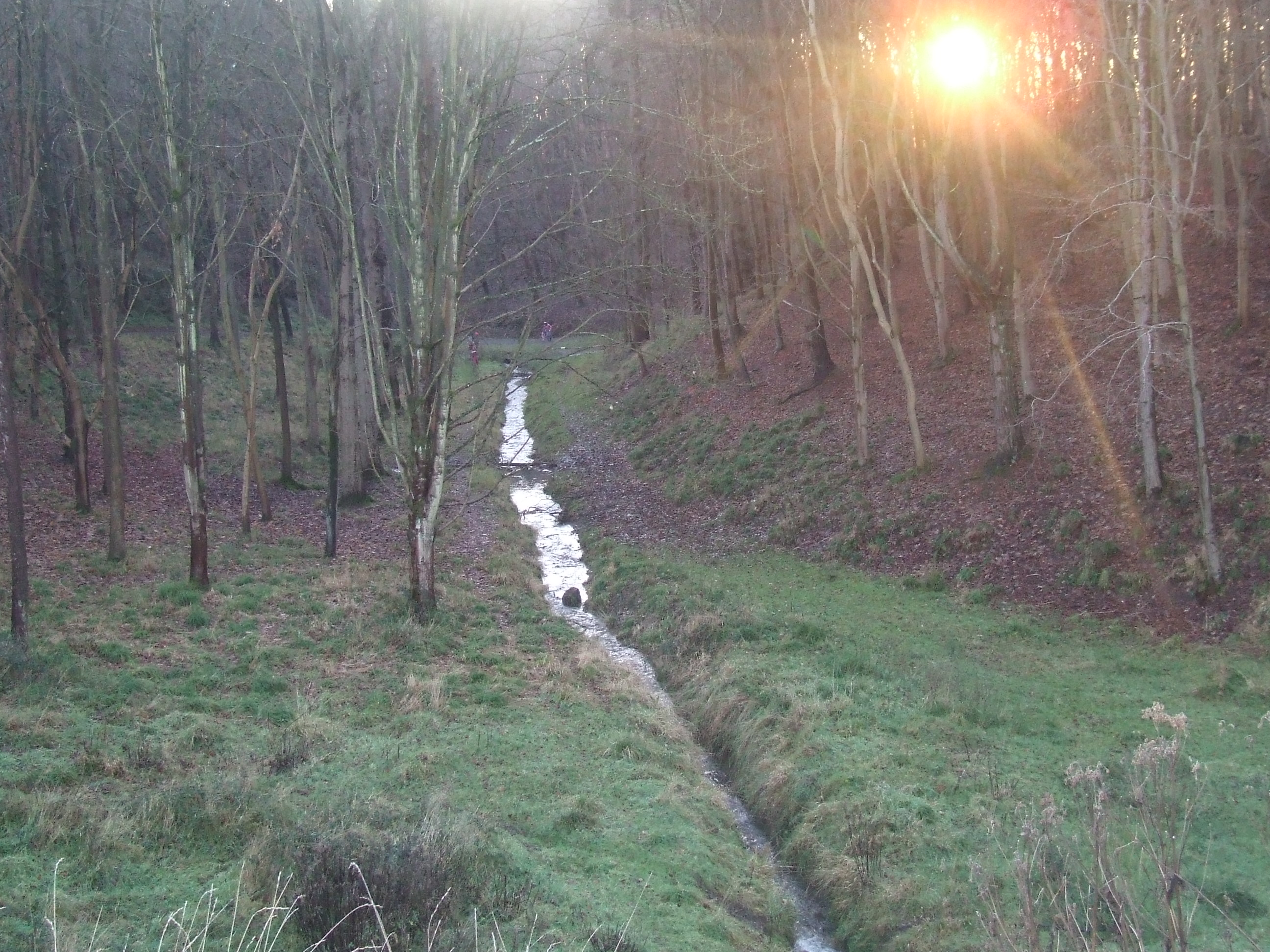
Phoenix Park

How to dispose of his fortune was a problem which greatly pre-occupied him during his last years. His marriage in 1633 to Cicely (or Charity) Dixon (1606–1678), daughter of Sir Robert Dixon, Lord Mayor of Dublin, was childless. During his years in Chester he had entered a relationship which produced a son (also called Maurice) and a daughter Mary, both of whom he was anxious to provide for, especially as he was still on friendly terms with their mother, who pressed her son's claim to the inheritance. Ball, who does not name her, suggests that she was a person of some social standing. Eustace had evidently made a promise to her to leave his lands to their son, which conflicted with his public promise to leave them to his nephew Maurice, the son of his brother William by Anne Netterville, daughter of Sir Robert Netterville of County Meath. He consulted the renowned preacher Jeremy Taylor, Bishop of Down and Connor, on the ethical question as to whether his pledge to his children's mother was binding: Taylor advised that it was not, but Eustace still wavered. How to balance the claims of his son and his two nephews, Maurice and John (another son of William), became almost an obsession with him, to the point where even his loyal friend Ormonde was forced to rebuke him for neglecting official business in favour of his private concerns. His last will divided the property between his nephews, a decision which led to ill-feeling and much further litigation (which was probably connected with a determined effort by one Captain Anglesey to seize possession of Eustace's townhouse).

The younger Sir Maurice ultimately gained possession of both Harristown and the Dublin townhouse on Eustace Street. He sat in the House of Commons for many years but was expelled for non-attendance in 1695. He returned to Ireland from exile, his brother John having died abroad, in 1697, and he, in turn, died in 1703 without surviving male issue. He had married firstly Anne Colville and secondly Clotilda Parsons. His estate was divided between his three surviving daughters, of whom the best-known is the younger Clotilda (1700–1792), "a clever and excellent woman", who married the poet Thomas Tickell, and was the grandmother of the playwright Richard Tickell. Her half-sister Penelope married firstly Robert Echlin (1674-1706) MP, eldest son of Sir Henry Echlin, and secondly Edward Stratford, while her half-sister Anne (died 1713) married the Irish MP Benjamin Chetwood, by whom she had several children.

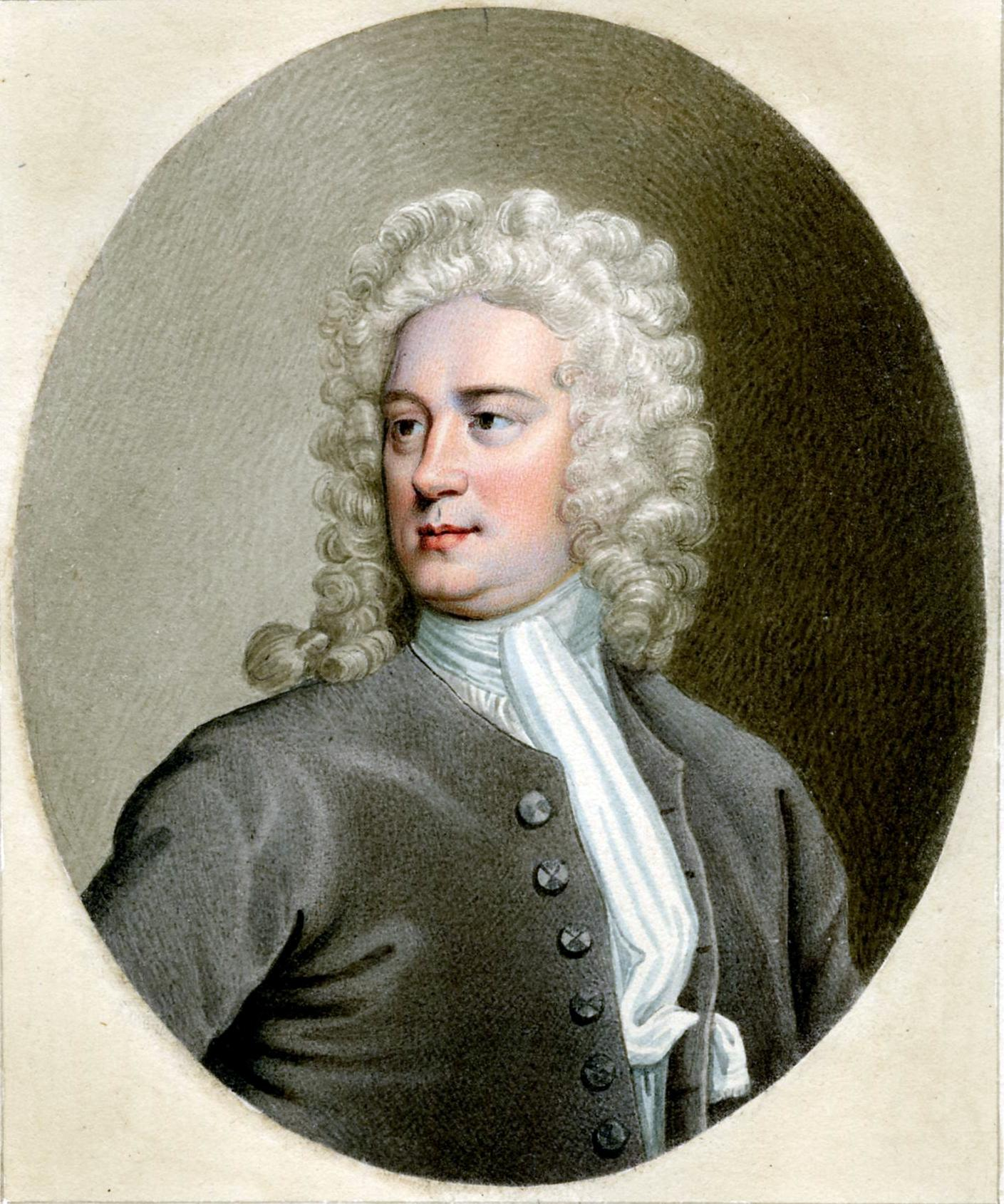
Thomas Tickell, the poet, who married Maurice's grandniece Clotilda Eustace

=== Title ===
Elrington Ball states that Eustace was offered a peerage shortly after the Restoration. With that habit of dithering which was so marked a feature of his character in his last years, he at first accepted the title Baron Portlester (commemorating a renowned fifteenth-century member of the Eustace family), and then changed his mind, on the ground that there was little point in creating a title which would not pass to either his natural son or his nephews.

== Death and memorials ==
In 1665 Eustace, though by then he was over seventy years old, appeared to have recovered his physical and mental health. At his niece Mary's wedding to Richard Dixon (who was apparently a relative of Maurice's wife) in the summer, he was "as brisk as a bee". He gave the couple his estate at Calverstown, County Kildare as a wedding gift; it later passed by inheritance to the Borrowes family. Shortly afterwards however he had a stroke and died. He was buried in a private ceremony the morning after his death at Castlemartin and the Government commemorated his services to the Crown with an official memorial in St. Patrick's Cathedral three weeks later, with a wax effigy taking the place of his corpse. It was rumoured that the official service was designed to counter a story that the private ceremony had been a Catholic one. His widow survived until 1678.

His name was given to Eustace Street in Dublin city centre, where his townhouse, Damask, stood. No trace of Damask survives today, but it is known to have been one of the largest houses in Dublin, and both the house and the gardens were much admired by Jonathan Swift. Eustace's death led to a dispute in which his heirs had to fight off a determined effort by one "Captain Anglesey", of whom little else is known, to take possession of Damask by force.

Political offices
Preceded by Sir Nathaniel Catelyn	Speaker of the Irish House of Commons; 1640–1649	Succeeded by Sir Audley Mervyn
Preceded by William Steele	Lord Chancellor of Ireland; 1660–1665	Succeeded by Archbishop Michael Boyle
