= Robert Dixon (Irish politician) =

Irish barrister, judge and politician

Robert Dixon (1685-1732) was an Irish barrister, judge and politician who served very briefly as a justice of the Court of Common Pleas (Ireland).

He was born at Calverstown, County Kildare, the only surviving son of Colonel Robert Dixon (died 1725), MP for Randalstown, who married Mary Story, widow of Patrick Lambert, MP for Taghmon, who lived at Dunmaine, County Wexford. He was the grandson of Sir Richard Dixon and Mary Eustace, daughter of William Eustace of Blakrath. He went to school in Drogheda, and matriculated from Trinity College Dublin in 1701. He entered the Inner Temple in 1704 and was called to the Irish Bar before 1711, becoming King's Counsel in 1716.

He entered politics and was elected to the Irish House of Commons in 1727 as member for Kildare. He was said to be a very effective Parliamentary orator, but had clearly set his heart on securing a seat on the Bench. This was a natural enough ambition as his family tree already boasted several distinguished judges, notably Sir Maurice Eustace, Lord Chancellor of Ireland 1660–1665, who was a close relative of his grandmother Mary Eustace. As a preliminary to his judicial appointment, he became Second Serjeant-at-law (Ireland) in 1728. Despite vigorous lobbying for a judgeship he did not reach the Common Pleas until 1731, only to die a few months later.

He married Mary Ormsby, daughter of John Ormsby of Cloghans, County Mayo; they had no children. On his death, Calverstown passed by marriage to the Borrowes family (Sir Kildare Borrowes, 3rd Baronet, who died in 1709, had married Robert's aunt and eventual heiress Elizabeth Dixon).

== Sources ==
- Ball, F. Elrington The Judges in Ireland 1221-1921 London John Murray 1926
- Burke, Sir Bernard Landed Gentry of Great Britain and Ireland London Harrison and Co. 1912
- Cokayne Complete Peerage Reprinted Gloucester 1983 5 volumes
- Hart, A.R. "History of the King's Serjeants at law in Ireland" Dublin Four Courts Press 2000
