= Arthur Pomeroy, 1st Viscount Harberton =

Irish peer and politician

Arthur Pomeroy, 1st Viscount Harberton (16 January 1723 – 9/11 April 1798) was an Anglo-Irish politician.

He was born in Cork, the eldest son of the Rev John Pomeroy, Archdeacon of Cork, and his wife Elizabeth Donnellan of Cloghan, County Roscommon.

He sat in the Irish House of Commons as the Member of Parliament for County Kildare from 1761 until he was raised to the Irish House of Lords as Baron Harberton in the Peerage of Ireland on 10 October 1783. He was further created Viscount Harberton on 5 July 1791.

He married Mary Colley, daughter of Henry Colley of Castle Carbury, great uncle of the 1st Duke of Wellington, by his wife Lady Mary Hamilton, daughter of James Hamilton, 6th Earl of Abercorn.

They had seven children, including Henry, 2nd Viscount, Arthur, 3rd Viscount and John, 4th Viscount Harberton. His youngest daughter, Mary, married Sir John Craven Carden, 1st Baronet of Templemore, County Tipperary. Another daughter, Henrietta, married James Hewitt, 2nd Viscount Lifford, but died after only two years of marriage. Two other children, George and Elizabeth, died unmarried. He was an ancestor of General George Colley (1835–81).

Parliament of Ireland
Preceded by Sir Kildare Borrowes, Bt; Maurice Keating	Member of Parliament for County Kildare; 1761–1783; With: Sir Kildare Borrowes, Bt (1761–1776); Lord Charles FitzGerald (1776–1783)	Succeeded by Lord Charles FitzGerald; John Wolfe
Peerage of Ireland
New creation	Viscount Harberton; 1791–1798	Succeeded by Henry Pomeroy
New creation	Baron Harberton; 1783–1798	Succeeded by Henry Pomeroy
