= Borrow =

Borrow or borrowing can mean: to receive (something) from somebody temporarily, expecting to return it.

- In finance, monetary debt
- In linguistics, change in a language due to contact with other languages
- In arithmetic, when a digit becomes less than zero and the deficiency is taken from the next digit to the left
- In music, the use of borrowed chords
- In construction, borrow pit
- In golf, the tendency of a putted ball to deviate from the straight line; see Glossary of golf#B

== People ==
- David Borrow (born 1952), British politician
- George Borrow (1803–1881), English author

== See also ==
- Borough
- Borro (disambiguation)
- Borrowes, a surname
- Borrows, a surname
- Bureau (disambiguation)
- Burrow
