= Thomas Dixon, 1st Baron of Symondstone =

Scottish noble, military (1247 – 1307)

Thomas Dixon 1st Baron of Symondstone
- Born: Thomas de Keith; 1 January 1247; Douglas, Lanarkshire, Scotland
- Died: 19 March 1307 (aged 59); Douglas Castle, Scotland
- Cause of death: during battle
- Resting place: St Bride's Kirk, Douglas
- Occupation(s): Hereditary Castellan of Douglas Castle, Laird of Symondstone and Hazleside

Thomas de Keith was born in 1247, scion of Clan Keith, by his father Richard de Keith (1225–1249), the Lord Marischals of Scotland, and Clan Douglas (by Margaret Douglas, daughter of William, Third Lord Douglas).

Thomas was created Thomas Dixon, First Baron of Symondstone and Hazleside, Captain of Douglas Castle by King Robert Bruce in 1317.

== Military career ==
Thomas de Keith's cousin Sir James Douglas enlisted his help to recapture Sanquhar Castle in 1295. Thomas proposed and led a charge of 30 men to seize the castle, impersonating the fuel man, knowing the countryman who supplied the garrison with firewood. Dixon, 'arrayed in the costume of the carrier, in the grey dawn of the early morn, drove his cart of wood up to the gate, which, with a remark as to his untimely arrival, the unsuspecting porter threw open. Dickson immediately stabbed the porter, and giving the signal, Douglas and his men rushed in and completed the work, all the garrison being put to death save one, who escaped and gave the alarm to the English troops in the vicinity.

The English subsequently laid siege with 3000 men: Douglas and Thomas slipped through the enemy camp to carry a message to William Wallace, who arrived with reinforcements and slew 500 English soldiers. Sir James Douglas granted Thomas lands at Hazleside for his services to William, Third Lord Douglas.

Thomas was made Hereditary Captain of Douglas Castle by King Robert Bruce in 1306, a role held by the Barons of Symondstone until 1616.

On Palm Sunday (19 March) 1307, he supported Sir James Douglas to recapture the castle from occupying English forces, in what became known in legend as the 'Douglas Larder'.

John Barbour's The Brus describes: Thomas Dycsone the nearest was, to them that were of the castle, who were all within the chancel, and when he so heard 'Douglas' cry, He drew out his sword, and fiercely rushed among them to and fro.

During battle, Thomas was mortally wounded, holding his abdomen closed to continue fighting, until he died.

Thomas Dixon is buried at St Bride's Church, Douglas.

== Barony of Symondstone ==
King Robert Bruce created the Barony of Symondstone in 1307, to Thomas Dixon, 1st Baron Symondstone. This was chartered posthumously in 1317, as Thomas Filius Ricardus, from Richard de Keith.

Charter 1317, by King Robert the Bruce of Scotland

To Thomas, Son of Richard,
For the Barony of Symington.
Robert, by the grace of God, King of Scots, to all good men of his whole realm, greeting. Know ye that we have given and granted and by this our present charter have confirmed to our faithful and beloved Thomas, Son of Richard, for his homage and service, the whole Barony of Symonstoun, with pertinents, within the sherriffdom of Lanark: To be held and possessed by the said Thomas and his heirs of us and our heirs, in fee and heritage by all their right marches and boundaries, freely, quietly, fully and honourably, with tenandries and the services of the free tenants of the said barony and with all other liberties, commodities, easements and their just pertinents belonging to the said barony or which by any manner of way may be held to pertain thereto: Paying therefore yearly the said Thomas and his heirs to us and our heirs the service usual and wont to be paid from the foresaid barony. In witness whereof...&c.

This Charter was issued in about 1317. It was one of 95 issued by Robert the Bruce between 1315 and 1321.

== Barons Symondstone (1307–1646) ==
The Barony of Simington was held by Symondstones of that ilk from the early 14th to the middle of the 17th century. The Barons of Symondstone were Hereditary Castellans of Douglas Castle until 1616.

Younger branches of the family formed Clan Dixon, one of the principal border clans of the East Marches.

The Barony of Symondstone was extant until 1646, after:

- Thomas Dixon, 1st Baron Symondstone (1247–1307)
- Duncan, 2nd Baron Symondstone (1275 – 1344)
- Thomas, 3rd Baron Symondstone
- Thomas, 4th Baron Symondstone
- William, 5th Baron Symondstone (1419-)
- John, 6th Baron Symondstone (1462–1536), Sheriff Depute of Lanark in 1478-1490.
- Archibald, 8th Baron Symondstone (1475-1545)
- William, 9th Baron Symondstone (1480–1535)
- John, 10th Baron Symondstone (1556–1605)
- John, 11th Baron Symondstone (1605–1612)
- John, 12th Baron Symondstone (1612–1646), died without issue.

== Dixon family (1300s - ) ==
Arms Red gules, gold fleur-de-lis, chief ermine. Crest Lion rampant, granted prior to 1448.

In the 1400s, the Dixons lived at High House, of Furness Abbey, and fought in Hundred Years War against the French. During the Great Raid of 1322, the abbot of Furness Abbey had allied with King Robert Bruce.

Sir Nicholas Dixon (1390-1448) was Baron of the Exchequer, undertreasurer of the pipe, and canon of Lincoln, rector of St Mary’s Cheshunt. He executed the will of the Ralph Neville, 1st Earl of Westmorland in 1425, who died at Raby Castle. Direct descendent George Dixon (1671-1752) was seneschal to Gilbert Vane, Second Baron Barnard at Raby Castle.

Sir John Dixon (1460-1523) held government office in London under Henry VIII. He married Lady Anne de Ros, daughter of Thomas de Ros, 5th Baron Ros of Kendal. Their children were:

- Sir Nicholas Dixon (1481-1559), statesman in Ireland with Francis Agarth, line of Dixons in Meath.
- Margaret Dixon (1485-1548), mother of Edwin Sandys (bishop), married in 1513 William Esthwaite Sandys, Henry VIII's Receiver General of the Liberties in Furness, after the dissolution of the Abbey in 1537.
- Myles Dixon (1492-1571), father of George Dixon of Ramshaw Hall, who received arms in 1614, line of Dixons of Durham.
- William Dixon (1493- ), granted the Carmelite of Cloncurry by Henry VIII in 1544 after the dissolution of the monasteries.

William Dixon was father of:

- William Dixon II (1535-1608), established an estate at Heaton Royds, Yorkshire, c. 1560s. From this line:
    - Dixons of Yorkshire, Gledhow Hall
    - Dixon Baronets of Astle, Astle Hall
    - Dixons of Northumberland, Belford Hall
    - Dixon Knights of Ireland
- Richard Dixon (bishop) (1540-1594)
