= Joshua Allen, 2nd Viscount Allen =

Irish peer and politician

Joshua Allen, 2nd Viscount Allen, LLD (17 September 1685 – 5 December 1742), was an Irish peer and politician.

He was the son of The 1st Viscount Allen, and succeeded to his father's titles on 8 November 1726. Between 1709 and 1727, he represented County Kildare in the Irish House of Commons.

== Family ==
The future Lord Allen married Margaret du Pass on 18 November 1707. They had seven children, of whom at least three died young. They included:

- John Allen, 3rd Viscount Allen (b. bef. 1708 – 25 May 1745)
- Elizabeth, married 1750 John Proby, 1st Baron Carysfort
- Frances, married 1758 William Mayne, 1st Baron Newhaven.

Parliament of Ireland
Preceded by Sir Kildare Borrowes, 3rd Bt; Thomas Keightley	Member of Parliament for County Kildare; 1709–1727; With: Thomas Keightley 1709–1715; Brabazon Ponsonby 1715–1725; Francis Allen 1725–1727	Succeeded by Richard Allen; Maurice Keating
Peerage of Ireland
Preceded by John Allen	Viscount Allen; 1726–1742	Succeeded by John Allen
