= Borrows =

Borrows is a surname. Notable people with the surname include:

- Alison Borrows (born 1992), Australian slalom canoeist
- Brian Borrows (born 1960), English footballer
- Chester Borrows (born 1957), New Zealand politician
- Edward Borrows, founder of Edward Borrows and Sons
- Simon Borrows (born 1959), British investment banker

== See also ==
- Borrowes, surname
- Borrow (disambiguation)
