= George Sheppard Murray =

Scottish banker and businessman (1851–1928)

Sir George Sheppard Murray
- Born: 26 June 1851
- Died: 27 October 1928 (aged 77); London
- Occupation(s): Banker and businessman
- Children: 2

Sir George Sheppard Murray (26 June 1851 – 27 October 1928) was a Scottish banker of the Mercantile Bank of India, London and China and businessman. He served as a member of the Legislative Council of the Straits Settlements from 1888 to 1906.

== Early life ==
Murray was born on 26 June 1851, the son of Alexander Murray of the Ceylon Civil Service.

== Career ==
Murray went out to British Malaya around 1880 and worked as manager in the Penang branch of the Mercantile Bank of India, London and China. He then moved to the Singapore branch where he eventually rose to managing director. During his 25 years of service at the bank he was credited for his valuable assistance to the Government of the Straits Settlements in connection with the issuing of bank notes, currency exchange, and other fiscal matters, and in connection with expropriation of the Tanjong Pagar Dock, for which he was knighted in 1906.

Murray was unofficial member of the Legislative Council of the Straits Settlements from 1888 to 1906. He also had business interests in cultivation being regarded as a pioneer in the rubber industry, and in the cultivation of ipecacuanha, in British Malaya, which it was reported eventually "brought a good reward".

Murray retired in 1906 and returned to the UK and started a stud farm near Limerick. A few years later he acquired Barretstown Castle, County Kildare from where he successfully continued stud farming.

== Personal life and death ==
Murray married Lucy Dennys in 1888 and they had a son and a daughter.

Murray died on 27 October 1928 at St James's Square, London, aged 77.

== Honours ==
Murray was created a Knight Bachelor in the 1906 Birthday Honours.
