= List of knights bachelor appointed in 1906 =

Knight Bachelor is the oldest and lowest-ranking form of knighthood in the British honours system; it is the rank granted to a man who has been knighted by the monarch but not inducted as a member of one of the organised orders of chivalry. Women are not knighted; in practice, the equivalent award for a woman is appointment as Dame Commander of the Order of the British Empire (founded in 1917).

== Knights bachelor appointed in 1906 ==
Date	Name	Notes	Ref
9 January 1906	Henry Sutton		
9 January 1906	James Buckingham, CIE		
26 January 1906	George Edward Knox	Indian Civil Service; Puisne Judge of the High Court of Judicature for the North-Western Provinces, India	
26 January 1906	Ralph Sillery Benson	Indian Civil Service; Puisne Judge of the High Court of Judicature at Madras	
26 January 1906	Harvey Adamson, CSI	Indian Civil Service; Chief Judge, Chief Court, Lower Burma	
26 January 1906	Walter Charleton Hughes, CIE	Chairman, Bombay Port Trust, and an additional Member of the Council of the Governor of Bombay for making Laws and Regulations	
26 January 1906	Alexander Pedler, CIE	Director of Public Instruction, Bengal, and Vice-Chancellor of the University of Calcutta	
26 January 1906	William Dickson Cruickshank, CIE	Secretary and Treasurer, Bank of Bengal	
16 February 1906	The Right Hon. John Fletcher Moulton, KC	Lord Justice of Appeal	
19 June 1906	Ralph Neville	Justice of His Majesty's High Court of Justice	
30 June 1906	Thomas Digby Pigott, CB	Formerly Controller of His Majesty's Stationery Office	
30 June 1906	Colonel Thomas Horatio Marshall, CB		
30 June 1906	Colonel Howard Whitbread, CB		
30 June 1906	Colonel George Jackson Hay, CB, CMG		
30 June 1906	Colonel Clement Molyneux Royds, CB		
30 June 1906	John McLeavy Brown, CMG		
30 June 1906	Robert Drummond-Hay, CMG	His Majesty's Consul-General at Beyrout	
30 June 1906	Major-General John Macdounld Moody		
30 June 1906	George Earle Welby, CMG	His Majesty's Minister Resident and Consul-General at Bogota	
30 June 1906	John Williams Benn, MP		
30 June 1906	Thomas Vansittart Bowater	Sheriff of London	
30 June 1906	Charles H. Brett		
30 June 1906	Joseph Bright	Alderman of Nottingham	
30 June 1906	William T. G. Cook		
30 June 1906	William Copland		
30 June 1906	William Crawford		
30 June 1906	Edward Evans		
30 June 1906	Luke Fildes, RA		
30 June 1906	Charles Gold		
30 June 1906	Francis Carruthers Gould		
30 June 1906	Daniel Mackinnon Hamilton		
30 June 1906	Robert Arundell Hudson		
30 June 1906	David Brynmor Jones, MP		
30 June 1906	Henry Munro		
30 June 1906	George Sheppard Murray	Formerly Unofficial Member of the Legislative Council of the Straits Settlements	
30 June 1906	William Nicoll	Chief Justice of Lagos	
30 June 1906	Alexander Russell Simpson, MD		
30 June 1906	John Bainford Slack		
30 June 1906	Henry George Smallman	Alderman and Sheriff of London	
30 June 1906	Andrew M. Torrance		
30 June 1906	Gordon B. Voules	"late of the Admiralty"	
30 June 1906	John Ward		
30 June 1906	Thomas Palmer Whittaker, MP		
30 June 1906	Edward Wood		
30 June 1906	Almroth Edward Wright, MD		
30 June 1906	Henry Greene Kelly, LLB	Chief Justice of Southern Nigeria	
30 June 1906	Robert Lintou Weatherbe	Chief Justice of the Supreme Court of Nova Scotia in the Dominion of Canada	
30 June 1906	William Owen	Puisne Judge of the Supreme Court of New South Wales	
30 June 1906	Æmilius Irving, KC		
30 June 1906	Chunder Madhub Ghose	Puisne Judge of the High Court of Judicature, at Fort William in Bengal	
11 July 1906	Joseph Baxter Ellis	Lord Mayor of Newcastle-upon-Tyne. On the occasion of the King and Queen's visit to the city for the opening of Armstrong College and the Royal Victoria Infirmary,	
19 July 1906	Edward T. Ann	Mayor of Derby	
19 July 1906	William Henry Perkin		
27 September 1906	Alexander Lyon	Lord Provost of Aberdeen. On the occasion of Their Majesties' visit to Aberdeen, for the opening of the new buildings of Marischal College.	
5 November 1906	William John Lancaster	Donor of the King Edward VII Grammar School, King's Lynn. On the occasion of the King's visit to King's Lynn to open the new buildings of King Edward VII Grammar School.	
18 December 1906	Robert John Parker	Justice of His Majesty's High Court of Justice	
18 December 1906	Henry Ballantyne		
18 December 1906	Colonel Francis William James Barker	of the War Office	
18 December 1906	John Henry Bethell, MP		
18 December 1906	Arthur William Biggs		
18 December 1906	Professor John William Byers, MD		
18 December 1906	William Edwin Clegg		
18 December 1906	James Fleming		
18 December 1906	Charles Frederick Hutchinson, MD		
18 December 1906	James Alfred Jacoby, MP		
18 December 1906	Henry Norman, MP		
18 December 1906	Henry Paget-Cooke		
18 December 1906	Professor William Mitchell Ramsay	of Aberdeen University	
18 December 1906	Alexander William Shaw		
18 December 1906	William Henry Talbot	Town Clerk, Manchester	
18 December 1906	Alfred Brumwell Thomas		
18 December 1906	John Tweedy, FRCS		
18 December 1906	Rubert Boyce, MB, FRS	Professor of Pathology, University of Liverpool	
18 December 1906	Lieutenant-Colonel Frederic Lewis Nathan, RA	Superintendent of the Royal Gunpowder Factory, Waltham Abbey	
18 December 1906	William Henry Hyndman Jones, LLB	Chief Justice of the Straits Settlements	
18 December 1906	Manuel Ramon Menendez, LLB	Chief Justice of Northern Nigeria	
18 December 1906	Charles James Tarring	Formerly Chief Justice of Grenada.	
