= Narraghmore =

Narraghmore Irish: An Fhorrach Mhór
- Village
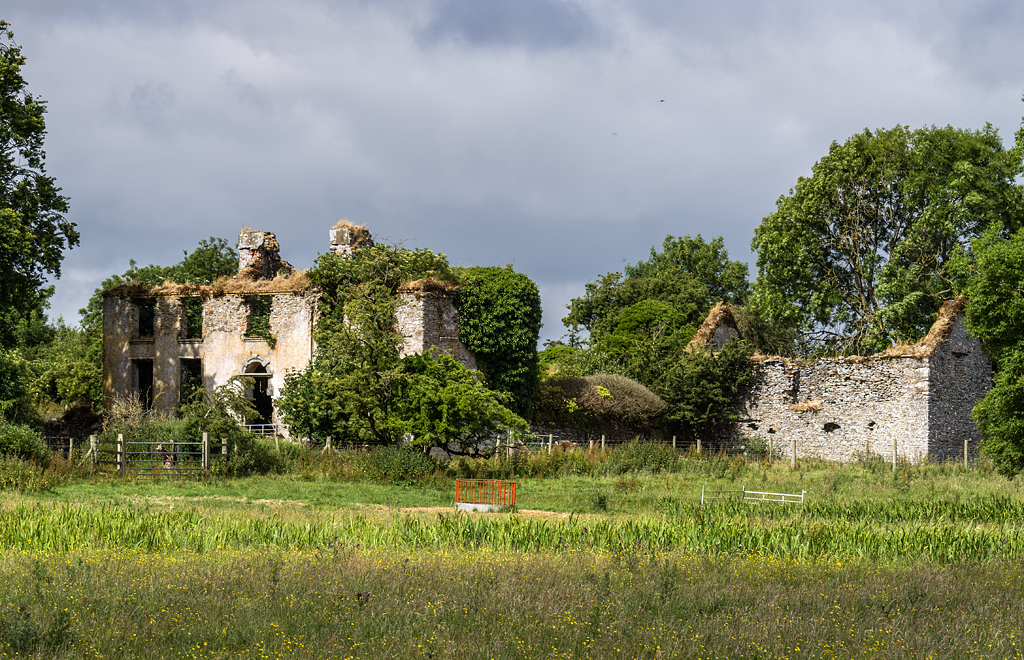
- Battlemount House, in Narraghmore Demesne, was the former home of Maurice Keatinge (c.1761–1835)

- Location in Ireland
- Coordinates: 53°03′N 6°50′W
- Country: Ireland
- Province: Leinster
- County: County Kildare

Population (2022)
  - Total: 375
- Time zone: UTC+0 (WET)
  - Summer (DST): UTC-1 (IST (WEST))

Narraghmore (Irish: An Fhorrach Mhór) is a village in County Kildare, Ireland. It lies within a civil parish of the same name. Nearby villages include Ballytore, Calverstown, and Kilmead. As of the 2022 census, Narraghmore had a population of 375.

Narraghmore village is 6.4 km from Ballytore and has the M9 motorway and R448 road to the west and the R418 road to the east.

== History ==
=== Built heritage ===
Evidence of ancient settlement in the area includes a number of ringfort and enclosure sites in the townlands of Narraghmore, Narraghmore Demesne and Lipstown. The Church of the Holy Saviour, a Church of Ireland chapel, was built between 1860 and 1863 as a private/estate chapel in Narraghmore Demesne. Located on the site of an earlier church, some of the works on the church are attributed to the architect Robert Jewell Withers. The former courthouse and post office in Narraghmore village, now a private house, dates from c. 1830 and may have been built to replace an earlier structure that was burned during the Irish Rebellion of 1798.

=== 1798 Rebellion ===
A number of actions, between the rebel United Irishmen and loyalist yeomanry and British Army, occurred in the Narraghmore area during the 1798 Rebellion. For example, during a rebel assault on Narraghmore's courthouse on 24 May 1798, three loyalists were killed and six were captured.

In subsequent engagements in the area, including an assault involving several thousand rebels, seven loyalist troops and around 200 rebels were killed. A number of the Narraghmore yeomanry, who had sided and fought with the rebels, were killed. In nearby Dunlavin, suspected United Irish prisoners were executed, including nine yeomen from Narraghmore.

On 27 May 1798, a group of British Army soldiers marching under a Colonel Campbell from Athy to Ballitore, destroyed the (recently completed and somewhat unfinished) home of Colonel Maurice Keatinge at Narraghmore. Keatinge, who represented Kildare in the Parliament of Ireland, had been suspected of supporting the United Irishmen.

== Amenities and sport ==
The village of Narraghmore has a Chinese take-away, a pub, and a community-run shop. The Narraghmore Stud Farm is nearby.

The local Gaelic Athletic Association (GAA) club, St Laurence's GAA, won the Kildare Senior Football Championship in 2009.

== See also ==
- List of towns and villages in Ireland
