= Belford Hall =

Grade I listed building, an 18th-century country house at Belford, Northumberland

Coordinates: 55°36′06″N 1°49′31″W

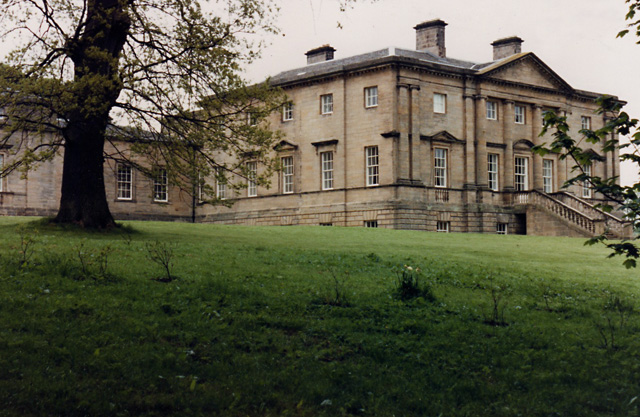
Belford Hall

Belford Hall is a Grade I listed building, an 18th-century mansion house situated at Belford, Northumberland.

The Dixons, of Yorkshire and Northumberland, were Squires of Belford from 1726. Belford Hall was built for Abraham Dixon in 1752, in a Palladian style to a design by architect James Paine.

== Architectural History ==
The Hall was built in 1752, in a Palladian style to a design by architect James Paine.

The House was remodelled in 1818, by the daughter of Margaret Brown (née Dixon), and added two new wings, with the assistance of architect John Dobson.

An extensive park, created in the mid 18th century, retains several original features and has been designated a conservation area. An 18th-century folly in the park is a Grade II listed building.

During World War II the Hall was requisitioned by the army and became neglected and dilapidated. In the 1980s it was acquired by the Northern Heritage Trust, renovated, restored, and converted to residential apartments. A golf course was created on a part of the park.

== Dixon Family of Northumberland ==
This line originated from the Dixon family of Heaton Royds, Yorkshire, which descends from Thomas Dixon, 1st Baron of Symondstone. The two eldest sons of John Dixon (b. 1564) moved to Newcastle, leading a line of Master Mariners and merchants, including Abraham Dixon (1620–83).

In 1726, Abraham Dixon (d. 1782) become Lord of the manor of Belford. Belford Hall was built in 1752 by his son, also Abraham, High Sheriff of Northumberland in 1759.

In 1770, heiress Margaret Dixon married William Brown (1743–1812) at Stamfordham. They had eleven children, including 'Dixon' (1776–1852), who later took his mother's maiden name Dixon, becoming Dixon Dixon, High Sheriff of Northumberland (1827), of Benton House and Unthank Hall, in 1827. Their son-in-law Lt. Col. William Clark, High Sheriff of Northumberland (1820) and Deputy Lieutenant, undertook the 1818 remodelling.

The Belford estate and village were sold in the 1920s, after which it fell into disrepair
