= 107th Regiment of Foot (1794) =

British Army infantry regiment from 1794 to 1795

The 107th Regiment of Foot was a short-lived infantry regiment of the British Army formed during the French Revolutionary Wars.

It was raised in Ireland on 8 April 1794 as Keating's Regiment of Foot under the command of Maurice Bagenal St Leger Keating. In October of the same year it was numbered as the 107th Regiment of Foot. It was disbanded in 1795.
