= Maurice Keatinge =

Irish landowner, soldier and politician

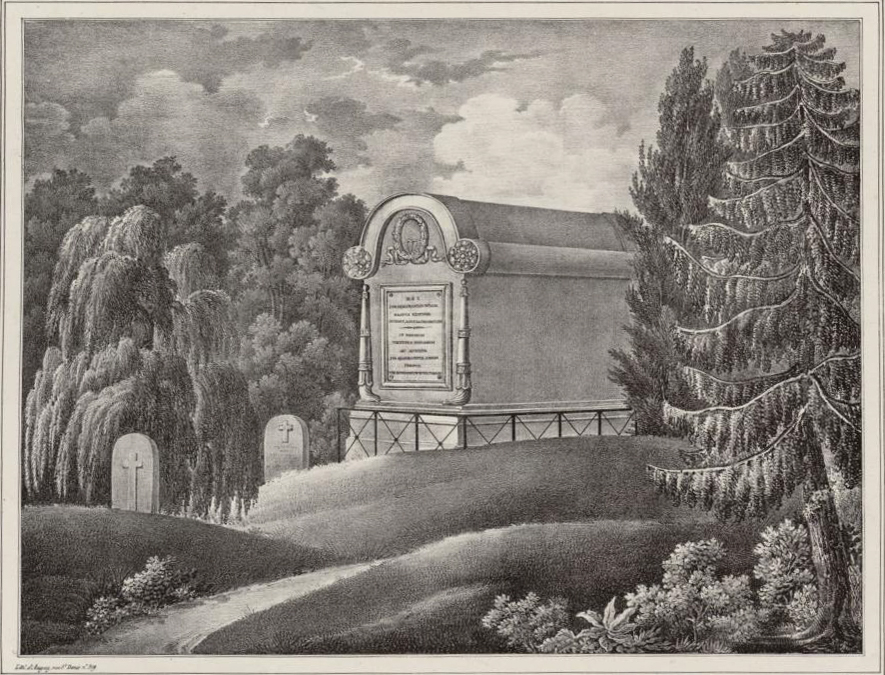
Père Lachaise Cemetery.

Maurice Bagenal St Leger Keatinge or Keating (c. 1761–1835) was an Irish landowner, soldier and politician.

He was the son of Maurice Keatinge of Narraghmore, County Kildare, an MP for Kildare in the Parliament of Ireland. Maurice jr. succeeded his father in 1777.

He joined the British Army as a cornet in the 3rd Dragoons in 1778, and was successively promoted to lieutenant in the 22nd Dragoons (1779), captain (1781) and then major (1782). He retired to half-pay in 1783, but later resumed his army career and further promoted to lieutenant-colonel in the 85th Foot (1794). That same year he was made colonel of the newly raised Keating's Regiment of Foot (later the 107th Foot) before finally leaving the army in 1796.

In 1790, he was elected an MP for County Kildare in the Irish Parliament until the union with Great Britain in 1801, after which he represented County Kildare in the UK Parliament (1801–1802). He was appointed High Sheriff of Kildare for 1790–1801 and 1793–1794.

He married in 1790 Lady Martha, the daughter of Anthony Brabazon, 8th Earl of Meath, with whom he had 6 daughters. He built a new mansion on his estate in Kildare which was soon afterwards burnt down by the British army in retaliation for his family's pro-rebel sympathies in the Irish rebellion of 1798.

In 1800, he translated Bernal Diaz del Castillo's La historia verdadera de la conquista de la Nueva España into English as The True History of the Conquest of Mexico.

In 1813, he sold his Kildare estate to Robert La Touche for £93,000 and died in Paris in 1835.

Parliament of Ireland
Preceded by Lord Charles Fitzgerald; John Wolfe	Member of Parliament for County Kildare; 1790–1801; With: Lord Edward FitzGerald (1790–1798); John La Touche (1798–1801)	Succeeded by the Westminster constituency County Kildare
Parliament of the United Kingdom
Preceded by the Irish parliamentary constituency of County Kildare	Member of Parliament for County Kildare; 1801–1802; With: John La Touche	Succeeded by Robert La Touche; Lord Robert Stephen FitzGerald
