= Borro (disambiguation) =

Borro (previously known as Borro Private Finance) is a US-based online pawnbroker and secured lender.

Borro may also refer to:

- Alessandro dal Borro (1600–1656), Tuscan nobleman and general
- Girolamo Borro (1512–1592), Italian philosopher
- Jean-Pierre Borro (born 1938), sailor from Monaco

== See also ==
- Boro (disambiguation)
- Borrow (disambiguation)
- Burro, a donkey
