= Loan (disambiguation) =

A loan is a financial instrument.

Loan may also refer to:

== Analogous concepts ==
- Borrowing, various senses
- Loan (sports), a player being allowed to play for another club without signing a contract
- Interlibrary loan, a user of one library borrowing books, etc. that are owned by another library
- Linguistics:
  - Loanword, a word directly taken into one language from another with little or no translation
  - Loan translation, a term in one language translated word-for-word from the term in another language

== Locations ==
- Loan, County Antrim, a townland in County Antrim, Northern Ireland
- Loan, Falkirk, a location in Scotland
- Loans, South Ayrshire, Scotland

== Name ==
- Loan, a common Vietnamese name
  - Nguyễn Ngọc Loan, Vietnamese general
  - Kelly Marie Tran, Vietnamese-American actress born Trần Loan

== See also ==
- Lone (disambiguation)
