= Sir Kildare Borrowes, 5th Baronet =

Sir Kildare Dixon Borrowes, 5th Baronet (20 January 1722 – 22 June 1790) was an Irish politician.

He was the oldest son of Sir Walter Borrowes, 4th Baronet and his wife Mary Pottinger, daughter of Captain Edward Pottinger. In 1741, Borrowes succeeded his father as baronet. Between 1745 and 1776, he represented County Kildare in the Irish House of Commons. Borrowes was also elected for Randalstown in 1760, but chose not to sit. In 1751, he was appointed High Sheriff of Kildare.

The main Borrowes family seat was at Barretstown Castle near Ballymore Eustace. They also inherited an estate at Calverstown in Kildare from their Dixon cousins (Kildare was the grandson of the Dixon heiress, Elizabeth).

== Marriages and children ==
In February 1759, Borrowes married Elizabeth Short, only daughter of John Short. After her death in 1766, he married secondly Jane Higginson, daughter of Joseph Higginson on 10 May 1769. He had three sons and a daughter by his first wife, as well as four sons and two daughters by his second wife. Borrowes was buried at Gilltown and was succeeded in the baronetcy by his oldest son Erasmus.

Parliament of Ireland
Preceded by Richard Allen; Maurice Keating	Member of Parliament for County Kildare; 1745–1776; With: Maurice Keating 1745–1761; Arthur Pomeroy 1761–1776	Succeeded by Lord Charles FitzGerald; Arthur Pomeroy
Preceded by Charles O'Neill; William Sharman	Member of Parliament for Randalstown; 1760–1761; With: Charles O'Neill	Succeeded by Charles O'Neill; John O'Neill
Baronetage of Ireland
Preceded by Walter Borrowes	Baronet (of Grangemellon); 1741–1790	Succeeded by Erasmus Borrowes
