= Sir Kildare Borrowes, 10th Baronet =

English cricketer

Kildare Dixon Borrowes (21 September 1852 – 19 October 1924) was an English first-class cricketer active 1882 who played for Middlesex. He was born in Exeter; died in Wateringbury.

He was High Sheriff of Kildare in 1902.

Baronetage of Ireland
| Preceded by Erasmus Borrowes | Baronet (of Grangemellon); 1898–1924 | Succeeded by Eustace Borrowes |
