= Norragh (hereditary barony) =

Irish feudal barony

The Barony of Norragh in County Kildare was an Irish feudal barony: that is, the holder had the right to call himself Baron, but did not hold a peerage and had no right to sit in the Irish House of Lords.

The De Wellesley family were of Anglo-Saxon origin but were rewarded with land in Somerset near the town of Wells (hence the name Wellesley). One of the first mentions of the family was in the year 1172 when their ancestor left Somersetshire to serve as standard-bearer to King Henry II of England and was rewarded for his services with land in Meath and Kildare. After this, there were multiple generations of knights in the family, including Waleran de Wellesley (died c.1276) who was Justice itinerant in Ireland between 1242 and 1261. He also served as a justice of "the Bench", probably a forerunner of the Court of Common Pleas (Ireland). He was also made a member of the Privy Council of Ireland c.1260. His property was mainly in Dublin. His son was Sir Waleran de Wellesley junior, High Sheriff of Kildare. The younger Waleran was killed in a skirmish with a local Irish clan in 1303.

In 1334 Waleran's descendant William de Wellesley was summoned to Parliament as Baron Norragh, but the dignity does not appear to have been inherited by his son Sir Richard De Wellesley. The Wellesley claim to the Barony of Norragh came through William's marriage to Elizabeth Staunton, only daughter of the heiress of Norragh, Elizabeth Calf, and her first husband, Sir John Staunton.

The Duke of Wellington was descended from the Wellesley family.

== See also ==
- List of baronies of Ireland
- Irish feudal barony
- Duke of Wellington
- Waleran de Wellesley
