= High Sheriff of Kildare =

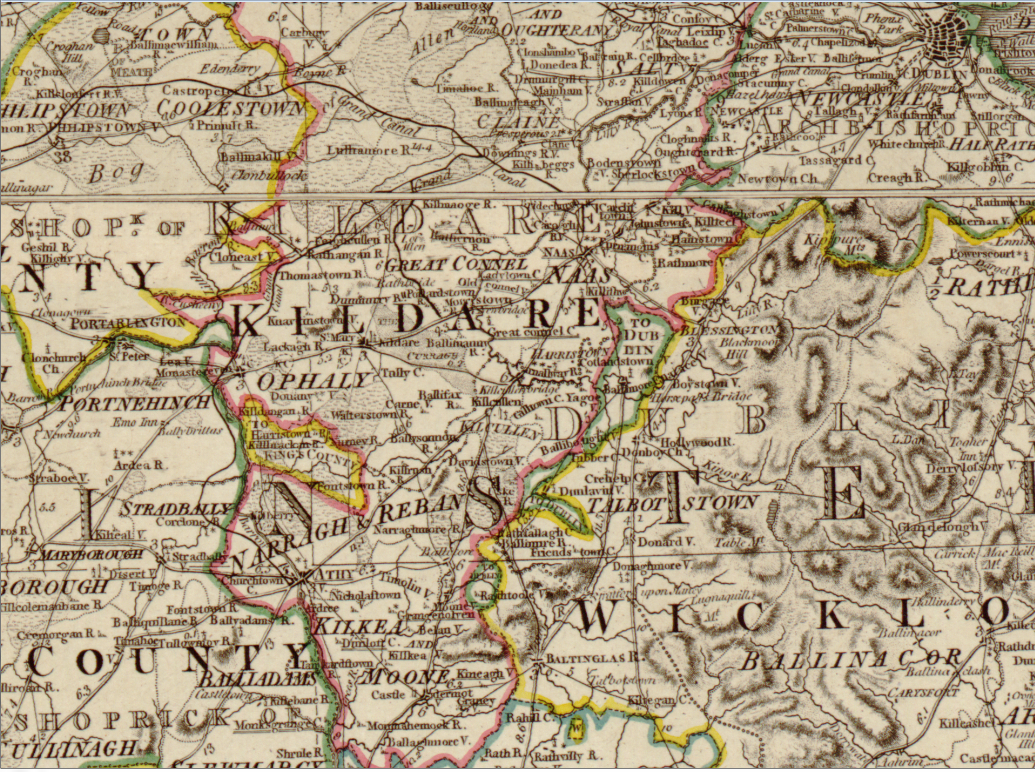
Map of County Kildare, 1797

The High Sheriff of Kildare was the British Crown's judicial representative in County Kildare, Ireland from the 16th century until 1922, when the office was abolished in the new Free State and replaced by the office of Kildare County Sheriff. The high sheriff had judicial, electoral, ceremonial and administrative functions and executed High Court Writs. In 1908, an Order in Council made the Lord Lieutenant the Sovereign's prime representative in a county and reduced the High Sheriff's precedence. However, the sheriff retained his responsibilities for the preservation of law and order in the county. The usual procedure for appointing the sheriff from 1660 onwards was that three persons were nominated at the beginning of each year from the county and the Lord Lieutenant then appointed his choice as High Sheriff for the remainder of the year. Often the other nominees were appointed as under-sheriffs. Sometimes a sheriff did not serve his full term due to death or another event, and another sheriff was then appointed for the remainder of the year. The dates given in this article are the dates of appointment.

In Ireland, the County Sheriffs were selected or "pricked" by the Lord Lieutenant. All addresses are in County Kildare unless stated otherwise.

== List of High Sheriffs of County Kildare ==
=== Pre-17th century ===
Source: Kildare Archaeological Society

- 1299 : William Alysaundre
- 1301: Albert de Kenley
- 1303 Sir Waleran de Wellesley (or John de Wellesley), knight, killed in battle with the Irish, October 1303, aged 70. Son of Waleran de Wellesley (died c.1276), justice in eyre, ancestor of the Duke of Wellington;
- 1306: Sir Hugh Canoun, or Canon.
- 1310–1314: David le Maryner (or Mazener)
- 1355: Richard Penkiston (also Escheator for Kildare)
- 1368: William De Wellesley (first term) u
- 1372: William de Wellesley (second term)
- 1373: William Ballymore
- 1374: Walter fitz John le Faunt
- 1375: John Creef
- 1376: Adam de Lyt
- 1378: Robert FitzEustace (? of Cradockstown).
- 1384 William De Wellesley
- 1386: Sir Maurice FitzEustace
- 1391: William de Wellesley
- 1392: John Fitz Maurice
- 1394: Patrick Flatesbury
- 1403: William de Wellesley
- 1414: Sir Richard FitzEustace
- 1415–16: Sir Richard De Wellesley of Dangan, County Meath and of Pollardstown, County Kildare
- 1419: Sir Richard De Wellesley (second term)
- 1421: Sir Richard De Wellesley of Dangan, County Meath and of Pollardstown, County Kildare (third term)
- 1422: Sir Richard De Wellesley (fourth term)
- 1423: Sir Edward FitzEustace, Knt.
- 1424: Robert Griffin
- 1428: Sir Edward FitzEustace, Knt.
- 1446: Robert Flatesbury (killed 1448)
- 1452: Christopher De Wellesley of Alasty
- 1456: Robert FitzEustace of Ballycutland (Coghlanstown)
- 1465: Christopher Flatesbury of Osbertown
- 1472: Philip Eustace of Newland
- 1484: Lawrence Sutton of Barbystown
- 1493: Richard Eustace of Eilgon (?Eilgowan)
- 1494: Bartholomew Aylmer of Lyons
- 1495: Bartholomew Aylmer
- 1496: Sir William De Wellesley
- 1498: Laurence Sutton of Tipper
- 1499: Maurice Eustace of Ballyoutland (Coghlanstown)
- 1502: Sir William Wogan of Rathcoffey
- 1507: William Eustace of Newland
- 1508: Laurence Sutton of Tipper
- 1509: William Eustace of Cradockstown
- 1523: Thomas Eustace, 1st Viscount Baltinglass of Henryston (Harristown)
- 1527: Thomas Netterfeld, snr.
- 1535: John Eustace of Harriston
- 1536: James FitzGerald of Osberdiston (Osberstown).
- 1537–38: Philip fitzMaurice FitzGerald, of Allen.
- 1540: William Birmingham of Dunfert.
- 1541: James FitzGerald of Ballysonnane (Ballyshannon).
- 1542: Nicholas Wogan of Rathcoffey
- 1543: Richard Aylmer of Lyons
- 1544: William Eustace of Mone (? Moone)
- 1556: Nicholas Eustace of Cradockston
- 1557: Patrick Sarsfield of Castledillon
- 1558: Redmund Fitzgeralde of Rathangan
- 1558–1560: Francis Cosby of Even [now Monasterevin]
- 1560: Maurice FitzGerald of "Gerardston"
- 1567: John Eustace of Castlemartin
- 1571: Robert Pypho
- 1573: Piers Fitz-Gerald of Ballysonan
- 1576: John Eustace of Castle Marten
- 1578: Peter Fitz-Gerald of Ballysonan
- 1580: John Eustace of Castle Marten
- 1581: Piers Fitz-Gerald of Ballysonan
- 1583: Redmond Bermingham of the Grange
- 158n: Thomas Fitz-Gerald of Timahoe, County Kildare
- 158n: William Eustace
- 1592: Maurice Eustace
- 1593: Sir Richard Fitzgerald
- 1594: John Sarsfield
- 1595: Sarsfield
- 1596: John Fitz-Gerald
- 1597: Sir Henry Duke
- 1598: James Fitz-Gerald

=== 17th century ===
- 1601: John Harbert
- 1602: Robert Nangle
- 1605: Rowland Fitz-Gerald
- 1606: Sir James Fitz-Gerald
- 1607: William Eustace of Castle Martin
- 1608: Pierce Butler
- 1609: Lewis Price
- 1610: Sir Richard Graham
- 1611: Thomas Potts
- 1612: Gerald Cowley
- 1613: William Meares
- 1614: Thomas Stokes of Madenstown
- 1615: Richard Tighe
- 1616: Sir Henry Bellings
- 1617: Philip Pilsworth
- 1618: Sir Henry Bellings
- 1620–21: Stephen Palmes
- 1622: Philip Pilsworth
- 1623: Sir Henry Colley
- 1624: John Weldon
- 1625 Sir Henry Bellings
- 1641: Sir Erasmus Borrowes, 1st Baronet
- 1649: George Medlicott of Tully
- 1654: Henry Bellingham
- 1656: John Hewetson of Kildare
- 1662: Richard Tighe of Woodstock
- 1667: Edward Bagot
- 1671: Garret Wellesley
- 1673: Sir Walter Borrowes, 2nd Baronet
- 1676: Sir William Sands, 1st Baronet
- 1677: Edward Bagot of Walterstown and Harristown
- 1678: Richard Nevill
- 1687–1688: John Wogan
- 1690: Sir Patrick Trant
- 1692: Richard Nevill
- 1697: Sir Kildare Borrowes, 3rd Baronet

=== 18th century ===
- 1707: Sir Kildare Borrowes, 3rd Baronet
- 1712: Thomas de Burgh
- 1714: Brabazon Ponsonby
- 1717: Charles Nuttal
- 1718: Alexander Burrowes
- 1727: John Stratford, 1st Earl of Aldborough
- 1729: James Garstin of Leragh Castle
- 1731: Edmund Armstrong
- 1732: John Digby
- 1734: Dudley Colley of Rahari
- 1741: Thomas Ashe of Moone (died in office and replaced by James Macmanus of Maynooth)
- 1751: Sir Kildare Dixon Borrowes, 5th Baronet
- 1756: Philpot Wolfe of Forenaghts
- 1758: Josiah George Hort
- 1761: Sir FitzGerald Aylmer, 6th Baronet
- 1762: Arthur Jones-Nevill of Furness
- 1763: Henry Boyle Carter
- 1764:
- 1771: Joseph Henry of Straffan
- 1772: William Robert FitzGerald, 2nd Duke of Leinster
- 1773: Richard Nevill of Furness
- 1774:
- 1788: Richard Griffith of Millicent House
- 1780: Thomas Carter
- 1781:
- 1782: James Kearney of Kearney Ville
- 1783: Michael Aylmer of Grange
- 1784: Samuel Mills of Turnings
- 1785: Edward Hendrick, of Kerdiffstown
- 1786:
- 1790: Maurice Bagenal St Leger Keatinge of Narraghmore
- 1791: Arthur Burdett of Bellaville
- 1793: Maurice Bagenal St Leger Keatinge of Narraghmore
- 1795: Sir Fenton Aylmer, 7th Baronet
- 1797: Robert La Touche of Harristown
- 1798: Lieutenant Thomas Tyrrell of Kilreany

=== 19th century ===
- 1801: John Greene of Milford
- 1803: John Joseph Henry of Straffan
- 1803: Thomas Tickell of Carnolway
- 1804: Michael Aylmer
- 1805: Peter Wolfe, of Blackhall
- 1806: William Mills
- 1807: Joshua Rice
- 1808: John Aylmer
- 1809: Sir Erasmus Dixon Borrowes, 6th Barone
- 1810: James Critchley
- 1811–1812: Thomas Finley
- 1813: James Critchley
- 1814–1815: Adam Tyrell
- 1815: Peter Wolfe of Blackhall
- 1816: Samuel McGomery Sir Erasmus Dixon Borrowes, 6th Baronet
- 1817: William Henry Carter of Castle Martin
- 1818: Sir (Josiah) William Hort, 2nd Baronet of Hortland
- 1819: John Aylmer
- 1820: Arthur Henry of Lodge Park
- 1821: Samuel Mills
- 1822: M C C Roberts
- 1823: Ponsonby Moore
- 1824: Captain George Burdett of Loughtown House
- 1825: Lord Henry Moore of Moore Abbey, Monastereven
- 1827: Sir Gerald George Aylmer, 8th Baronet
- 1833: The Honorable George Francis Collet of Rathangan
- 1834: John Michael Henry Fock, 3rd Baron de Robeck
- 1835: John Bonham of Ballintaggart
- 1836: John Hyacinth Nangle of Garrisker, Clonard
- 1838: Edward Lawless, 3rd Baron Cloncurry
- 1839: Walter Hussey de Burgh of Donore House, Naas
- 1840: Hugh Barton of Straffan House
- 1841: Richard Maunsell of Oakley Park
- 1842: James FitzGerald, 1st Marquess of Kildare
- 1843: Charles William FitzGerald, 1st Baron Kildare
- 1844: David O'Connor-Henchy of Stonebrook
- 1845:
- 1846: John La Touche of Harristown
- 1848: John Rowland Eustace of Baltraney
- 1849: Edward J. Beauman, of Furnace, Nass
- 1850: John Rowland Eustace
- 1851: Nathaniel Barton of Straffan House
- 1852:
- 1854: Sir Gerald George Aylmer, 9th Baronet
- 1856: Edward More O'Ferrall of Kildangan
- 1857: John Harvey Lewis of Kilcullen
- 1858: Penthony O'Kelly of Botristown, Newbridge
- 1859: John Henry Edward Fock, 4th Baron de Robeck of Gowran Grange
- 1860: Thomas De Burgh of Oldtown, Naas.
- 1861: Hugh Lynedoch Barton of Straffan House.
- 1863: Frederick Hugh Henry of Lodge Park.
- 1864:
- 1866–67: Francis Edmond Joseph MacDonnell of Dunfierth.
- 1867: Valentine Lawless, 4th Baron Cloncurry.
- 1868: John Maunsell of Oakley Park (son of Richard, HS in 1841)
- 1870: Samuel G Ireland of Robertstown.
- 1871: Montagu William Edward Dobbs of Castle Dobbs, County Antrim.
- 1873: Sir Erasmus Dixon Borrowes, 9th Baronet
- 1874: George Mansfield of Morristown Lattin.
- 1875: Charles Colley Palmer.
- 1876: Ambrose More-O'Ferrall.
- 1878: William Peisley Hutchinson Lloyd Vaughan of Golden Grove, Rosecrea.
- 1878: William Blacker of Castle Martin.
- 1879: Dominic More-O'Ferrall of Kildangan.
- 1880: Richard Wilson Hartley of Beech Park, County Dublin.
- 1881: Marquess of Kildare.
- 1882: Thomas Richard Frederick Cooke-Trench.
- 1884: Hugh O'Connor-Henchy of Stonebrook.
- 1884: Thomas John de Burgh of Oldtown.
- 1885: George Woods Maunsell of Ashford, County Limerick. (son of Richard, HS in 1841)
- 1886: Charles Frederick Crichton of Mullaboden.
- 1887: Robert Mackay Wilson of Coolcarrigan.
- 1888: Edmund Casimir Sweetman of Longtown.
- 1889: Marmaduke William Coghill Cramer-Roberts of Sallymount.
- 1890: John Christopher Murphy of Mullen.
- 1891: Richard Mark Synnot Maunsell of Oakley Park.
- 1892: William Ireland de Courcy-Wheeler of Robertstown House.
- 1893:
- 1894: Hans Hendrick Hendrick-Aylmer of Kerdiffstown.
- 1895: Thomas Green.
- 1896: John Algernon Aylmer of Courtown, Kilcock.
- 1897: Surgeon-Major T.R. Keogh.
- 1899: Richard St Leger Moore of Naas.

=== 20th century ===
- 1900: George Wolfe of Forenaghts and Bishopsland
- 1901: William Trench Kirkpatrick of Donacomper, Celbridge
- 1902: Sir Kildare Dixon Borrowes, 10th Baronet of Barretstown Castle, Ballymore Eustace, Naas
- 1903: James Laurence Carew
- 1903: Bertram Francis Barton of Straffan House
- 1904:
- 1906: Nicholas Joseph Synnott.
- 1906: Henry Eliardo de Courcy-Wheeler of Robertstown House.
- 1907: Sir William Goulding, 1st Baronet of Millicent, Sallins.
- 1908: Bertram Hugh Barton of Straffan House.
- 1909: Hugh Arthur Henry of Firmount, Sallins.
- 1910: Joseph Henry Greer of Grange, Moy, County Tyrone.
- 1911: Hugh Wyndham Montgomery of Ballymore.
- 1912:
- 1916: Capt Rt Hon Herbert Dixon, OBE, Ballyalloy, near Comber, County Down.
