= Bureau (surname) =

Bureau is a surname. Notable people with the surname include:

- André Bureau (1935–2019), Canadian lawyer and communications executive
- Bernard Béréau (1940–2005), French footballer
- Bernard Bureau (born 1959), French footballer
- Édouard Bureau (1830–1918), French physician and botanist
- Florent Bureau (1906–1999), Belgian mathematician
- Gaspard Bureau (died 1469) French artillery officer, brother of Jean
- Jacques Bureau (1860–1933), Canadian politician
- Jean Bureau (c. 1390–1463) French artillery commander
- Jean Pierre Roman Bureau (1770–1851), French-born American politician and co-founder of Gallipolis, Ohio
- Marc Bureau (ice hockey) (born 1966), Canadian ice hockey player
- Marc Bureau (politician) (born 1955), Canadian politician, mayor of Gatineau
- Roger Bureau (1905–1945), Belgian speed skater and ice hockey player
- Stéphan Bureau (born 1964), Canadian television journalist
