= Special Olympics Ireland =

Sporting organisation

- Sport: Special Olympics
- Jurisdiction: Ireland
- Founded: 1978
- Headquarters: Dublin
- CEO: Karen Coventry

Official website
- www.specialolympics.ie

Special Olympics Ireland is a sporting organisation for children and adults with intellectual disabilities that operates in the Island of Ireland. It is part of the global Special Olympics movement.

== History ==
The organization was founded in 1978 by Eunice Kennedy Shriver to provide children and adults with a year-round sports programme . The organisation was made up of 27,000 athletes. At the time, it was one of the first European programmes of the international Special Olympics movement.

== Purpose ==
Special Olympics Ireland creates opportunities for children and adults with learning (intellectual) disabilities to take part in various sports training and competition year-round. To be eligible to take part in the Special Olympics programmes, participants have to have an intellectual/learning disability.

== Organisation ==
In 2021, there were more than 8,000 Special Olympics athletes, aged 4 with no upper age limit, participating in 15 sports in 290 clubs throughout the island of Ireland. These athletes benefit from taking regular sport training and competition programmes. It is broken up into five regions: Special Olympics Connaught, Special Olympics Leinster, Special Olympics Munster, Special Olympics Ulster and Special Olympics Eastern Region, which is for the Dublin Clubs.

== Special Olympics Ireland Games ==
The Special Olympics Ireland Games are held every four years.

=== Editions ===
Edition	Year	Host city
I	2006	Belfast
II	2010	Limerick
III	2014	Limerick
IV	2018	Dublin
not held due to Covid 19	2022	
V	2026	Dublin
