= Sir Kildare Borrowes, 3rd Baronet =

Sir Kildare Borrowes, 3rd Baronet (c. 1660 – May 1709) was an Irish politician.

He was the son of Sir Walter Borrowes, 2nd Baronet and his first wife Lady Eleanor FitzGerald, daughter of George FitzGerald, 16th Earl of Kildare and Lady Joan Boyle. His mother's family were the richest in County Kildare and this cemented the position of the Borrowes family in the local landed gentry. In 1685, Borrowes succeeded his father as baronet. He was High Sheriff of Kildare in 1697 and again in 1707. Borrowes sat in the Irish House of Commons for County Kildare from 1703 until his death in 1709. His owned Barretstown Castle, which he inherited from his mother, but his main residence was at Gilltown.

He married Elizabeth Dixon, eldest daughter of Sir Richard Dixon and Mary Eustace of Calverstown, County Kildare. She died in 1745 They had two sons and three daughters. Borrowes was buried at Gilltown and was succeeded in the baronetcy by his eldest son Walter. Walter also inherited the Dixon estate at Calverstown from his cousin Robert Dixon.

"Borrowes" was pronounced "burrows".

Parliament of Ireland
Preceded by George FitzGerald; Henry Colley	Member of Parliament for County Kildare; 1703–1709; With: Thomas Keightley	Succeeded by Joshua Allen; Thomas Keightley
Baronetage of Ireland
Preceded by Walter Borrowes	Baronet (of Grangemellon); 1685–1709	Succeeded by Walter Borrowes
