= Elizabeth Calf =

Queen consort of Leinster, Baroness of Norragh

Elizabeth le Veel
- Born: Norragh, County Kildare, Ireland
- Spouses: Sir John Staunton of Otymy; Art mac Art MacMurrough-Kavanagh
- Children: Elizabeth Staunton; Diarmait Lavderg; Donnchadh mac Art MacMurrough, Lord of Garyshill, King of Leinster; Gerald Kavanagh, Lord of Ferns
- Parent: Sir Robert le Veel of Norragh

Elizabeth le Veel, also known as Elizabeth Calf (d. after 1417), was an Anglo-Irish noblewoman, and wife of Art mac Art MacMurrough-Kavanagh, King of Leinster. Her marriage to Art violated the Statutes of Kilkenny, and resulted in her property being forfeited to the English crown. This caused her husband to declare war in Ireland against the forces of King Richard II of England.

== Family ==
Elizabeth was born at Norragh, County Kildare, Ireland on an unknown date, the daughter and heiress of Sir Robert le Veel of Norragh. Norragh had been in her family since the manors of Norragh and Skethness (now Skerries, County Dublin) were granted to her ancestor Sir Michael le Veel in 1320. Her family is better known by the name Calf, which is the Anglicised version of le Veel.

== Marriages and issue ==
In 1374 upon the death of her father she married her first husband Sir John Staunton of Otymy, County Kildare, (now Clane) who died before 1390. She had at least one child by Sir John, a daughter Elizabeth who would marry into the Wellesley family. In 1390, Elizabeth married her second husband, Art mac Art MacMurrough-Kavanagh, King of Leinster (1357–1417). The marriage produced at least three sons:

- Diarmait Lavderg (died 1417)
- Donnchadh mac Art MacMurrough, Lord of Garyshill, King of Leinster (reigned 1417–1455), fathered a son, Murtough Kavanagh, who was the heir to the kingdom of Leinster
- Gerald Kavanagh, Lord of Ferns (died 1431). He is the direct ancestor of the present-day MacMurrough-Kavanaghs.

The marriage between Art and Elizabeth violated the Statutes of Kilkenny which prohibited intermarriage between the English and the Irish. Art also claimed the important barony of Norragh by right of his wife who had inherited the barony suo jure in 1374, when her father died. When the barony was forfeited to the English crown in 1391, Art declared war against the English. King Richard II arrived in Ireland in 1394, at the head of an army which consisted of over 8,000 men. The English suffered many casualties due to the covert attacks Art perpetrated against King Richard's men. Finally, a truce was reached in 1395; Art went to Dublin where he swore fealty to King Richard and received the honour of a knighthood. The barony on Norragh was restored to him. However, when the king departed for England in May 1395, Art renounced his fealty and proceeded to harass the English who lived in the Pale. In 1398, when Roger Mortimer, 4th Earl of March, Lord Lieutenant of Ireland, and King Richard's heir presumptive, was killed at the Battle of Kells in a skirmish with an Irish clan, the English king sought revenge against Art. King Richard led a second expedition to Ireland in 1399, and Art's lands of Norragh were once again forfeited to the English crown. However, it was this last expedition to Ireland which cost the king his throne; as he had brought with him most of his household knights and loyal nobles. Upon his return to England, King Richard discovered that the kingdom had fallen into the hands of his cousin, Henry of Bolingbroke, who would subsequently imprison and depose Richard, and reign as King Henry IV.

== Later life ==
Elizabeth seems to have been in good standing with the English Crown in her later years. In January 1410, she obtained a favour from Henry IV for John Cansham of Dublin. In 1417 she was confirmed in her title of Baroness and her right to the lands of Norragh. Her precise date of death is unknown.
