= Borrowes baronets =

Extinct baronetcy in the Baronetage of Ireland

The Borrowes Baronetcy of Grangemellon in the County of Kildare, was a title in the Baronetage of Ireland. It was created on 14 February 1646 for Erasmus Borrowes, High Sheriff of Kildare in 1641. Erasmus was the son of Henry Borrowes of Gilltown (died 1615), who emigrated from Devon to Ireland in the reign of Elizabeth I. Through his mother Jane, Erasmus was the grandson of the distinguished soldier and politician Sir Arthur Savage.

Sir Walter Borrowes, 2nd Baronet, was High Sheriff of Kildare in 1673. Sir Kildare Borrowes, 3rd Baronet was twice High Sheriff of Kildare and a member of the Irish Parliament for County Kildare. He joined the Dixon and Borrowes families by marrying Elizabeth Dixon, who held the Barretstown Castle and Calverstown estates. His son Sir Walter Borrowes, 4th Baronet represented Harristown and Athy in the Irish Parliament. The latter's son Sir Kildare Borrowes, 5th Baronet represented County Kildare and was High Sheriff of Kildare in 1751. The 6th Baronet was High Sheriff of Queen's County in 1800. Erasmus Dixon Borrowes, 9th Baronet was High Sheriff of Kildare in 1873 and High Sheriff of Queen's County in 1880. The baronetcy became extinct on the death of the 11th baronet in 1939.

== Borrowes baronets of Grangemellon (1646) ==
Escutcheon of the Borrowes baronets of Grangemellon

- Sir Erasmus Borrowes, 1st Baronet (died c. 1650)
- Sir Walter Borrowes, 2nd Baronet (c. 1620–1685)
- Sir Kildare Borrowes, 3rd Baronet (c. 1660–c.1709)
- Sir Walter Dixon Borrowes, 4th Baronet (1691–1741)
- Sir Kildare Dixon Borrowes, 5th Baronet (1722–1790)
- Sir Erasmus Dixon Borrowes, 6th Baronet (1759–1814)
- Sir Walter Dixon Borrowes, 7th Baronet (1789–1834)
- Sir Erasmus Dixon Borrowes, 8th Baronet (1799–1866)
- Sir Erasmus Dixon Borrowes, 9th Baronet (1831–1898)
- Sir Kildare Borrowes, 10th Baronet (1852–1924)
- Sir Eustace Dixon Borrowes, 11th Baronet (1866–1939)
