= County Kildare (Parliament of Ireland constituency) =

Pre-1801 Irish constituency

- Former county constituency for the Irish House of Commons
- County: County Kildare

1297–1801
- Seats: 2
- Replaced by: County Kildare

County Kildare was a constituency represented in the Irish House of Commons from 1297 to 1801.

== History ==
In the Patriot Parliament of 1689 summoned by James II, County Kildare was represented with two members.

== Members of Parliament ==
- 1376: John Rocheforde and Peter Rowe were elected to come to England to consult with the king and council about the government of Ireland and about an aid for the king.
- 1420 Walran Eustace and Richard Barby
- 1429 Sir Richard FitzEustace
- 1560 Nicholas Eustace and James Flattisbury
- 1585 William Sutton and Thomas Fitzmorris
- 1613–1615 John Sutton and Sir William Talbot, 1st Baronet
- 1634–1635 Sir Nicholas Whyte and Maurice Eustace (Speaker)
- 1639 Maurice Fitzgerald (expelled and replaced 1642 by Henry Warren) and Maurice Eustace (Speaker)
- 1661–1666 Hon Robert Fitzgerald and Sir Paul Davys

=== 1689–1801 ===
Election	First MP		Second MP
1689	John Wogan		George Aylmer
1692	George FitzGerald		Robert FitzGerald
1698	George FitzGerald		Henry Colley
1703	Sir Kildare Borrowes, 3rd Bt		Thomas Keightley
1709	Joshua Allen (Note: Styled as The Honourable from 1717)		Thomas Keightley
1715	Joshua Allen		Brabazon Ponsonby (Note: Styled as The Honourable from 1721)
1725	Joshua Allen		Francis Alen
1727	Richard Allen		Maurice Keating
1745	Sir Kildare Borrowes, 5th Bt		Maurice Keating
1761	Sir Kildare Borrowes, 5th Bt		Arthur Pomeroy
1776	Lord Charles FitzGerald		Arthur Pomeroy
1783	Lord Charles FitzGerald		John Wolfe
1790	Lord Edward FitzGerald	Patriot/Whig	Maurice Bagenal St Leger Keating
1798	John La Touche		Maurice Bagenal St Leger Keating
1801	Succeeded by the Westminster constituency County Kildare		

== Bibliography ==
- O'Hart, John (2007). The Irish and Anglo-Irish Landed Gentry: When Cromwell came to Ireland. Vol. II. Heritage Books. ISBN 978-0-7884-1927-0.
- Leigh Rayment's historical List of Members of the Irish House of Commons. Cites: Johnston-Liik, Edith Mary (2002). The History of the Irish Parliament 1692-1800 (6 volumes). Ulster Historical Foundation.
- Clarke, Maude V. (1932–34). "William of Windsor in Ireland, 1369-1376". Proceedings of the Royal Irish Academy: Archaeology, Culture, History, Literature. 41: 55–130. JSTOR 25515963.
- Richardson, Henry Gerald; Sayles, George Osborne (1947). Parliaments And Councils Of Mediaeval Ireland (PDF). Vol. 1. Dublin: Stationery Office. p. xxx (38/308).
