= Barretstown Castle =

Castle in County Kildare, Ireland

Coordinates: 53°09′N 6°36′W

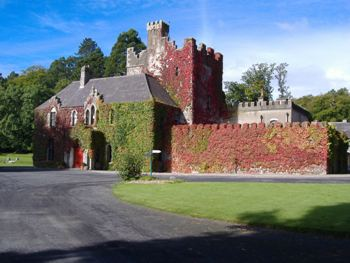
Barretstown Castle

Barretstown Castle is a castle in Ballymore Eustace, County Kildare, Ireland. It stands on the site of a late 12th century Anglo-Norman castle. It now hosts the Barretstown camp for sick children.

== History ==
=== Early history ===
The first historical mention of the place is in a 1547 inquisition held after the Dissolution of the Monasteries, when Barretstown Castle was listed as the property of the Archbishop of Dublin, from whom it was promptly confiscated by the Crown. Thereafter the Castle was held by the Eustace family on a series of "permanent leases."

In the 17th century Sir Walter Borrowes married a daughter of the earl of Kildare and acquired the estate, and the family retained possession for over 200 years. Members of the family, such as Sir Kildare Borrowes, 5th Baronet, represented County Kildare and Harristown in the former Parliament of Ireland.

Unlike the Eustace baronets of the 16th and 17th centuries, the five Borrowes baronets who spanned the 19th century played no part in public life. This quiet aristocratic reign ended with the flamboyant Sir Kildare, 10th Baronet (1852–1924), whose father Rev. Sir Erasmus, 8th Baronet, had significantly modified the residence in a medieval, romantic, asymmetrical style.

In 1918, the Borrowes family having left Ireland, Barretstown was purchased by Sir George Sheppard Murray, a Scotsman who converted the estate into a stud farm, and planted many of the exotic trees that dominate the landscape.

=== Arden and Westons ===
In 1962 Elizabeth Arden acquired the castle from the Murray family. Over five years, Arden extensively reconstructed, redecorated, and refurnished the castle. Her influence dominates the look of the house to this day. The door of the castle is reputed to have been painted red after her famous brand of perfume Red Door, and remains so to this day.

After Arden's death in 1967, the international biscuit tycoon Garfield Weston took up residence. Under his ownership the grounds were significantly improved, particularly through the addition of a magnificent lake in front of the castle.

=== State ownership ===
The Weston family, which owns Dublin's famous Brown Thomas department store, presented the estate to the Irish government in 1977, during which time it was used for national and international conferences and seminars, as well as being used as a part of the Irish National Stud.

==== Barretstown Camp ====
The Irish government has leased the castle and its grounds to the Barretstown Camp for 90 years for a nominal €1.26 per year. Part of Paul Newman's SeriousFun Children's Network, Barretstown Camp opened in August 1994, serving 124 children. With the completion of the new medical centre and programme hall, in 1995 the camp served nearly 300 children from Ireland, the United Kingdom, Germany, France, the United States, and Chernobyl disaster areas. In 2009, Barretstown expected to serve 1900 children from around Europe.
