= Calverstown =

Village in County Kildare, Ireland

Calverstown Baile an Chalbhaigh
- Village
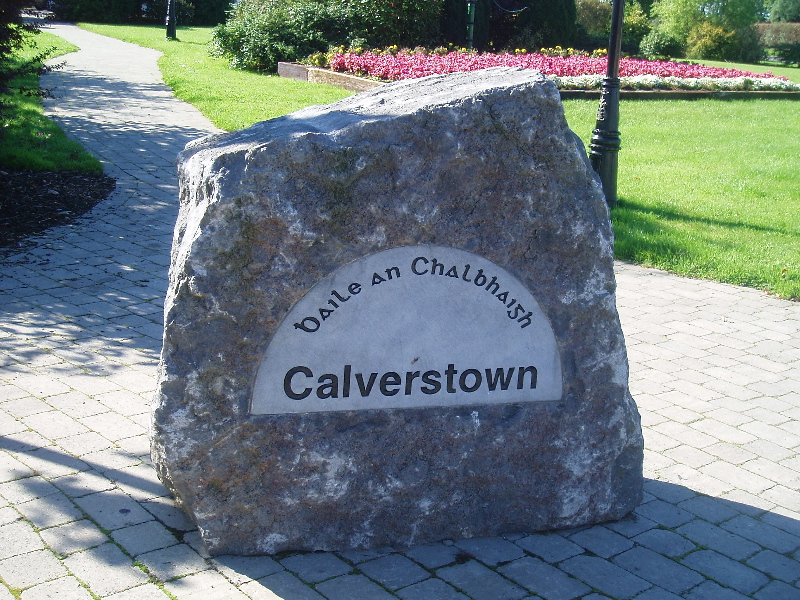

- Location in Ireland
- Coordinates: 53°04′57″N 6°47′53″W
- Country: Ireland
- Province: Leinster
- County: County Kildare
- Elevation: 106 m (348 ft)

Population (2016)
  - Total: 699
- Time zone: UTC+0 (WET)
  - Summer (DST): UTC-1 (IST (WEST))
- Irish Grid Reference: N802041

Calverstown (Irish: Baile an Chalbhaigh) is a small village in County Kildare, Ireland. It lies 6 km (3.7 mi) south of the town of Kilcullen and about 16 km (9.9 mi) from each of the towns of Athy, Kildare, Naas and Newbridge. It is an old settlement located close to the archaeological sites of Dún Ailinne and Old Kilcullen. The village has a stream running through it with another to the south. As of the 2016 census, Calverstown had a population of 699.

== History ==
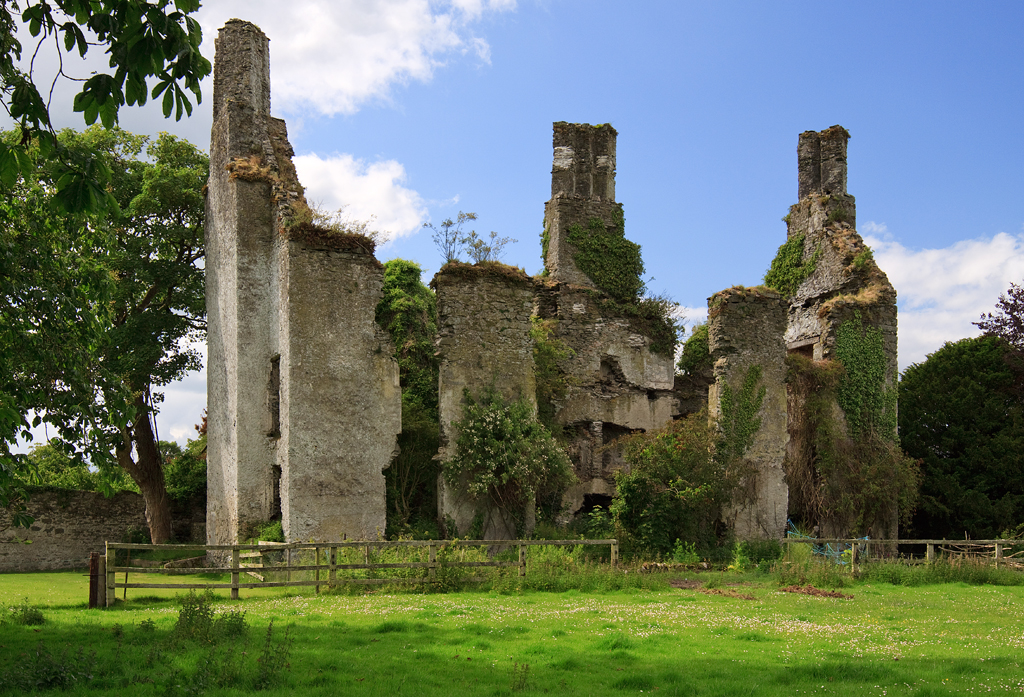
The ruins of Calverstown Castle, a 17th-century manor house, incorporate an earlier tower house

Calverstown has been in existence as a named location since the early medieval period. An early reference to lands described as "Terra Philippi Vituli" (Latin for "Philip of Calves land") provides an unaudited confirmation in the form of a petition from the Order of Hospitallers of Kilmainham listing their possessions to Pope Innocent III in 1212. The Irish name Baile an Chalbhaigh was historically anglicised as Ballinchalwey, Ballinchallowe and Ballinchalloe.

In a note to an edition of Bishop Richard de Ledrede's account of the Kyteler witchcraft trial, Wright (1843, pp. 56-57) noted that Walter le Veele, or Calf, of Calfstown was Chancellor of Kildare Cathedral and was made Bishop of Kildare in 1299. He purchased the manor of Norragh, in which Calverstown is situated, from Geoffrey de Norragh before his death in 1332. The barony was inherited by his nephew John Calf, who passed it to his son Sir Robert Calf and to his daughter Elizabeth Calf who married William Wellesley of Baronsrath, whose heirs held the barony after that. The name of the town appears to be derived from the anglicised name of the le Veele family.

It is explicitly mentioned in a Rental of Gerald Earl of Kildare begun in 1518-19 1518 as "In baronia de Norragh. Item, in the barone of the Norragh & may be distraynet at Calfiston: £6" (MacNiocaill 1992, 291); and in the Extents of Irish Monastic Possessions 1540-41. In the former, the name is spelt Calfiston, in the latter, Calveston.

The Civil Survey of 1656 noted that in 1641 Calverstown contained 760 Irish acres of land and had one castle and a stone quarry and was held by Sir Robert Dixon (Simington 1952, 98) The Dixon family held the estate until about 1730, when it passed by inheritance to the Borrowes Baronets.

The population, street layout and land use have changed little over the past two-and-a-half centuries. A map from 1752 shows a layout very similar to that of today. The natural environment reflects the predominance of well-established enclosed agricultural land.

The ruins of Calverstown Castle (an early 17th-century manor house incorporating an earlier tower house) are located to the south of the village in the demesne of the later (18th century) Calverstown House.

=== Battles at Ballyshannon and Kilrush ===
Two battles were fought nearby. In 738 at the Battle of Uchbad (Ballyshannon, Grid reference N78830), Aed Allin defeated the Laigin and established Kildare's hegemony over the kingship of Leinster that would last nearly 300 years. In 1642, James Butler, Earl of Ormond defeated his second cousin Richard Butler, Lord Mountgarrett, on the high grounds of Kilrush and Bullhill, a victory was considered so important that the English House of Commons voted him £500 for the purchase of a jewel, and petitioned the King to create him a Knight of the Garter. The site has since then been known as Battlemount (Grid reference S 77276). Guillaume le Maréchal (or William Marshall), Earl of Pembroke and son-in-law of Strongbow, founded an Augustinian Abbey in Kilrush at the start of the thirteenth century, which subsisted until the Suppression of the Monasteries in the 1540s.

=== Birth of motor racing ===
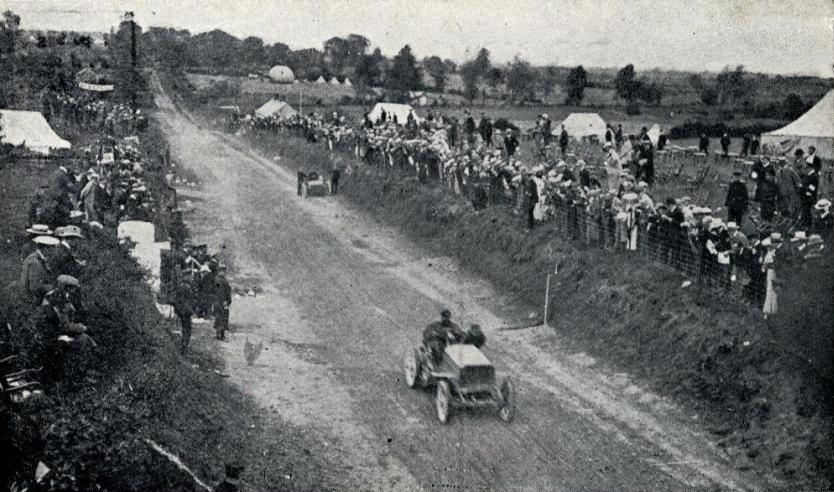
1903 Gordon Bennett Trophy. René de Knyff, driving his Panhard to second place, passes Alexander Winton repairing the Winton Bullet 2 on the first lap.

On Thursday, 2 July 1903 the Gordon Bennett Cup started at the Ballyshannon crossroads 1 mile (2 km) from the centre of Calverstown. It was the first international motor race to be held in Great Britain. The Automobile Club of Great Britain and Ireland wanted the race to be hosted in the British Isles, and Ireland was suggested as the venue because racing was illegal on British public roads. After some lobbying, several local laws were adjusted and Kildare was chosen as the location – at least partly because the straightness of the roads was seen as a safety benefit. As a compliment to Ireland, the British team chose to race in Shamrock green (Note: According to Leinster Leader, Saturday, 11 April 1903, Britain had to choose a different colour to its usual national colours of red, white and blue, as these had already been taken by Italy, Germany and France respectively. It also stated red as the color for American cars in the 1903 Gordon Bennett Cup.) which thus became known as British racing green. The route consisted of several loops of a circuit that passed through Kilcullen, Kildare, Monasterevin, Stradbally, Athy, Castledermot, and Carlow. The race started at the Ballyshannon cross-roads (53.0853°N 6.82°W) near Calverstown on the contemporary N78. The 328 miles (528 km) race was ultimately won by the Belgian racer Camille Jenatzy, driving a Mercedes.

== Notable people ==
- Veronica Burns (1914 – 1998), was an Irish museum curator, born in Calverstown
- Robert Dixon (1685-1732), was an Irish barrister, judge and politician
- Otto Skorzeny (1908-1975), Austrian-born German Nazi, owned nearby Martinstown House from 1959-1971.
- Ruby Walsh, a national hunt jockey, lives in Calverstown with his family.

== See also ==
- List of towns and villages in Ireland
