= William Caulfeild (1665–1737) =

Irish barrister, Law Officer and judge

William Caulfield (1665 – 24 August 1737) was an Irish barrister, Law Officer and judge: one of his sons became Lord Chief Justice of Ireland.

He sat in the Irish House of Commons for Tulsk, and was later raised to the bench as justice of the Court of King's Bench (Ireland), and served on that Court 1715–1734.

He was son of Thomas Caulfield of Donamon Castle (died 1691) and Anne Moore, and grandson of William Caulfield, 2nd Baron Caulfeild, and of Charles Moore, 2nd Viscount Moore of Drogheda.

As a wealthy landowner, he did not have to earn a living, and he was not called to the Irish Bar until he was forty, having previously entered Middle Temple. He became Second Serjeant in 1708, resigning in 1711, and was appointed Prime Serjeant in 1714. As a Law Officer he was noted for his zeal in dealing with agrarian disturbances.

Ball states that he owed his career advancement entirely to his Whig sympathies, but he seems to have been a conscientious enough judge. As Ball also notes he and his King's Bench colleagues dealt with all indictable crimes in Dublin city and county. The workload was heavy, and the late 1720s and early 1730s were noted for a number of much-publicised trials, such as that of the surgeon John Audoen, convicted and executed for the murder of his maid Margaret Keeffe in 1728. Another notable trial was that of Daniel Kimberley, an attorney who was charged with forcing a wealthy twelve-year-old girl, Bridget Reading, into marriage with one of his clients in 1730. In 1719 while on assize Caulfield narrowly escaped death when the roof of Roscommon Courthouse collapsed, with the loss of many lives.

The heavy workload affected Caulfield's health; he was unable to go on assize from 1730 onwards. He visited London and Bath in hopes of a cure. He retired on health grounds in 1734.

He married Lettice, daughter of Sir Arthur Gore, 1st Baronet by his wife Eleanor, daughter of Sir George St George (knight of Carrickdrumrusk), and was father of (among others) Thomas Caulfeild, Toby Caulfeild, and St George Caulfeild, all of whom were also MPs for Tulsk: St. George became Lord Chief Justice, and one of the most beloved Irish judges of his time.

William's residence was Donamon Castle, County Roscommon, which he inherited from his father in 1691.

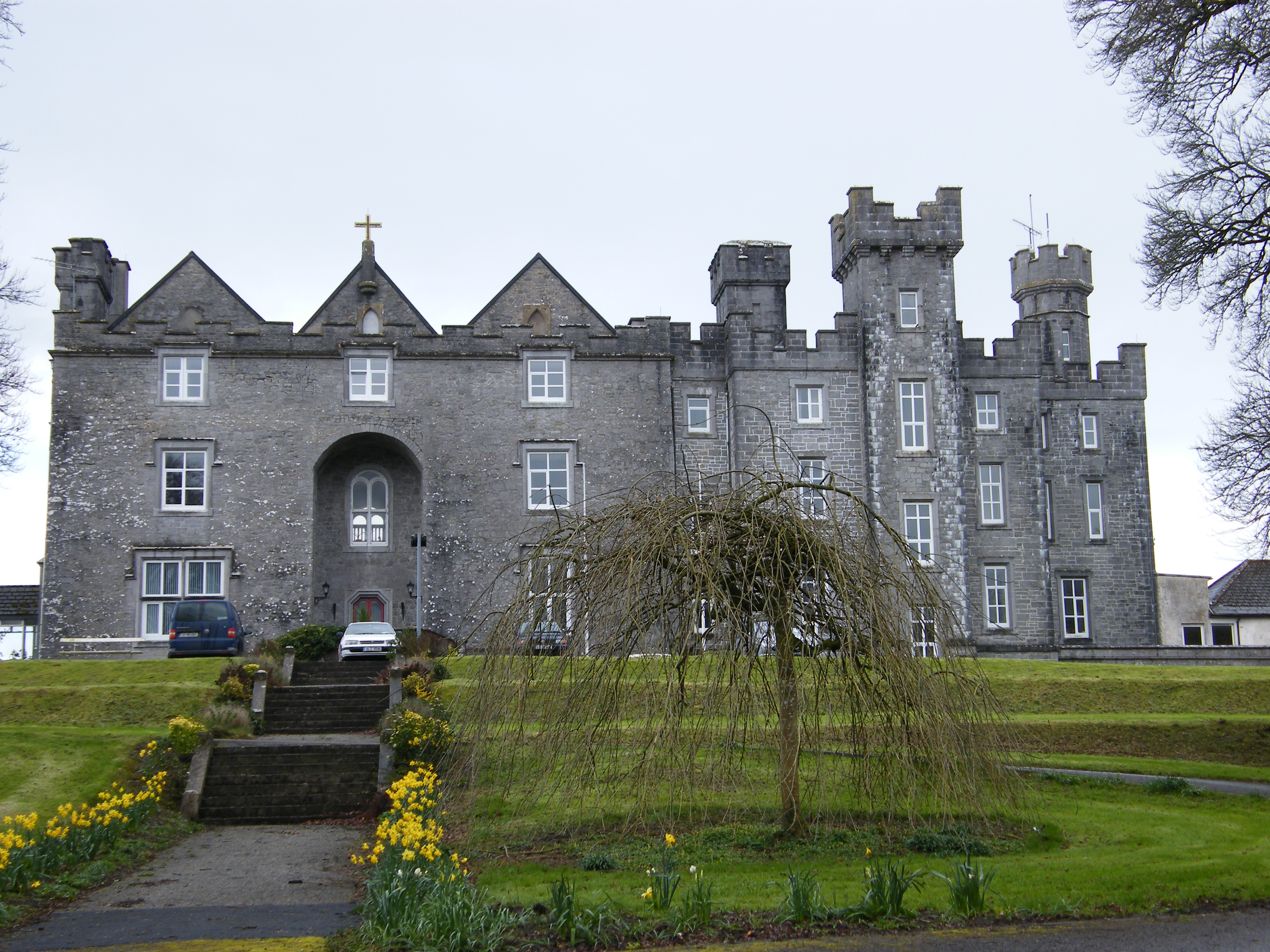
Donamon Castle, present day
