= Chetwood =

Chetwood is an English surname. Notable people with the surname include:

- Benjamin Chetwood (1655–1728), English-born Irish politician
- Clifford Chetwood (1928–2009), British businessman
- Knightly Chetwood (1650–1720), English priest, poet and translator
- William Chetwood (1771–1857), American politician
- William Rufus Chetwood (died 1766), English publisher

== See also ==
- Chetwood Creek, a river in California, United States
- Chetwoot Lake, in the heart of the Alpine Lakes Wilderness, Washington, United States
- Chetwode
- Chetwode (surname)
- Baron Chetwode
