= St George Caulfeild =

St George Caulfeild (16 September 1697 – 17 May 1778) was Lord Chief Justice of Ireland. He was a popular and respected judge, who was known in old age as "the good old man".

He sat in the Irish House of Commons as Member of Parliament for Tulsk between 1727 and 1751. He was appointed to the Irish Privy Council on 14 October 1751.

He was admitted to Middle Temple in 1716 and called to the Irish Bar in 1723. He was solicitor to the Revenue in 1734, Solicitor-General for Ireland 1739–41, Attorney-General for Ireland 1741-1751 and Lord Chief Justice of Ireland 1751–60.

He was the fourth son of William Caulfeild, judge of the Court of King's Bench (Ireland) and his wife Lettice, daughter of Sir Arthur Gore, 1st Baronet by Eleanor, daughter of Sir George St George (knight of Carrickdrumrusk). He was the great-grandson of William Caulfeild, 2nd Baron Caulfield.

He was highly esteemed by both his British and Irish colleagues for his learning and humanity. Ball refers to his conduct of an abduction case where he refused to allow defence counsel to cross-examine the victim about her personal life, asking how any man of honour and compassion could propose to ask such questions of a young woman.

In 1759 he was one of several judges attacked by a mob outside the Irish House of Commons. The target was not Caulfield, who was very popular, but John Bowes, 1st Baron Bowes, whose strong support for the Penal Laws had made him much hated by the Roman Catholic section of public.

He retired in 1760; although he had a house at Aungier St. in central Dublin, he spent much of his time at the family estate, Donamon Castle, County Roscommon In 1770 he was attacked and wounded there by his former bailiff.

Ball refers to a prayer attributed to Charles Wesley which may actually have been written by Caulfield. He died unmarried in 1778.

Parliament of Ireland
| Preceded by John French; Thomas Caulfeild | Member of Parliament for Tulsk; 1727–1751; With: Toby Caulfeild 1727–1741; Thomas Caulfeild 1741–1747; Frederick Gore 1747–1751 | Succeeded by Frederick Gore; Robert Cuninghame |
Legal offices
| Preceded by John Bowes | Solicitor-General for Ireland; 1739–1741 | Succeeded by Warden Flood |
| Preceded by John Bowes | Attorney-General for Ireland; 1741–1751 | Succeeded by Warden Flood |
| Preceded by Thomas Marlay | Lord Chief Justice of the King's Bench for Ireland; 1751–1760 | Succeeded by Warden Flood |
