= William Macartney =

William Macartney may refer to:

- William Macartney (1714–1793), MP for Belfast
- Sir William Isaac Macartney, 2nd Baronet (1780–1867), of the Macartney baronets
- William Ellison-Macartney (1852–1924)
- Sir William Isaac Macartney, 4th Baronet (1867–1942), of the Macartney baronets

== See also ==
- William McCartney (disambiguation)
