= John Macartney =

John Macartney may refer to:

- John Ellison-Macartney (1818–1904), Irish barrister and politician
- John Arthur Macartney (1834–1917), British colonist, squatter and grazier
- Sir John Macartney, 1st Baronet (died 1812), MP for Naas and Fore in Parliament of Ireland
- Sir John Macartney, 3rd Baronet (1832–1911), of the Macartney baronets
- Sir John Barrington Macartney, 6th Baronet (1917–1999), of the Macartney baronets
- Sir John Ralph Macartney, 7th Baronet (born 1945), of the Macartney baronets

== See also ==
- John McCartney (disambiguation)
