= Robert Downes =

Robert Downes may refer to:

- Robert Downes (bishop) (died 1763), Church of Ireland bishop
- Robert Downes (politician) (1708–1754), Irish politician
- Bob Downes (Robert George Downes, born 1937), English avant-garde jazz flautist and saxophonist
- Bobby Downes (film producer) (born 1967), American film producer
- Bobby Downes (footballer) (Robert David Downes, born 1949), English footballer, coach and manager

== See also ==
- Robert Downs (disambiguation)
