= Toby Caulfeild =

Toby Caulfeild may refer to:

- Toby Caulfeild, 1st Baron Caulfeild, English army officer
- Toby Caulfeild, 3rd Baron Caulfeild, Anglo-Irish politician
- Toby Caulfeild (1694–1740), Irish MP for Tulsk, 1727–1740
- Toby Caulfeild (1750–1772), Irish MP for Tulsk, 1771–1772
