= Sir Henry Hamilton, 1st Baronet =

Sir Henry Hamilton, 1st Baronet (1710 – 26 June 1782) was an Anglo-Irish politician.

Hamilton sat in the Irish House of Commons as the Member of Parliament for Londonderry City from 1747 to 1768, before representing Killybegs between 1768 and his death in 1782. On 23 January 1775 he was made a baronet, of Manor Cunningham in the Baronetage of Ireland; the title became extinct upon his death.

Parliament of Ireland
Preceded by William Scott; Frederick Cary-Hamilton	Member of Parliament for Londonderry City; 1747-1768; With: William Scott (1747-1760); William Hamilton (1760-1761); Francis Andrews (1761-1768)	Succeeded by Francis Andrews; Hugh Hill
Preceded by Richard Jones; William Gerard Hamilton	Member of Parliament for Killybegs; 1768-1782; With: Thomas Allan (1768-1776); Hon. John Knox (1777-1782)	Succeeded by William Burton Conyngham; James Fitzgerald
Baronetage of Ireland
New creation	Baronet (of Manor Cunningham); 1775-1782	Extinct
Preceded by Johnston baronets	Hamilton baronets of Manor Cunningham; 23 January 1775	Succeeded by Johnson baronets
