= Henniker baronets =

Baronetcy in the Baronetage of the United Kingdom

Escutcheon of the Henniker baronets of Newton Hall

The Henniker Baronetcy, of Newton Hall in the County of Essex, was created in the Baronetage of the United Kingdom on 2 November 1813 for Brydges Henniker, who had earlier represented Kildare Borough in the last Irish Parliament. He was the youngest son of John Henniker, 1st Baron Henniker. The sixth baronet was an admiral in the Royal Navy and sat as Conservative member of parliament for Galloway. The eighth Baronet was a brigadier in the Royal Engineers. As of 2026, the Official Roll considers the baronetcy dormant.

== Henniker baronets, of Newton Hall (1813) ==
- Sir Brydges Trecothic Henniker, 1st Baronet (1767–1816)
- Sir Frederick Henniker, 2nd Baronet (1793–1825)
- Sir Augustus Brydges Henniker, 3rd Baronet (1795–1849)
- Sir Brydges Powell Henniker, 4th Baronet (1835–1906)
- Sir Frederick Brydges Major Henniker, 5th Baronet (1862–1908)
- Sir Arthur John Henniker-Hughan, 6th Baronet (1866–1925)
- Sir Robert John Aldborough Henniker, 7th Baronet (1888–1958)
- Sir Mark Chandos Auberon Henniker, 8th Baronet (1906–1991)
- Adrian Chandos Henniker, presumed 9th Baronet (born 1946)

There is no heir.

== See also ==
- Baron Henniker

== Notes ==
Baronetage of the United Kingdom
Preceded by Duckworth baronets	Henniker baronets of Newton Hall; 2 November 1813	Succeeded by Hislop baronets
