= Maurice Keating =

Maurice Keating may refer to:

- Maurice Keatinge (c. 1761–1835), or Keating, Irish landowner, soldier and politician
- Maurice Keating (1690–1769), Irish politician
