= Walter Hussey Burgh =

Irish politician, barrister, and judge (1742–83)

Walter Hussey Burgh SL
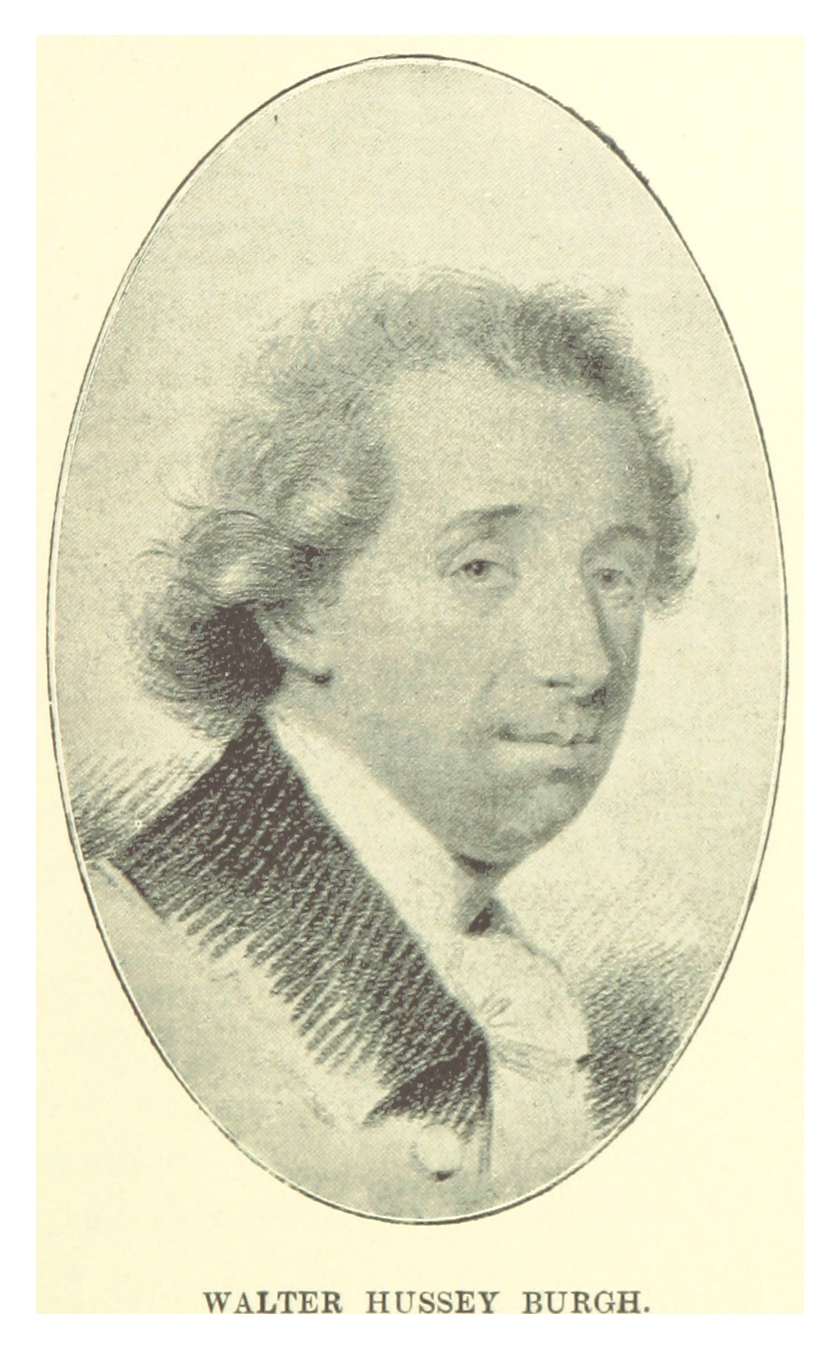

Chief Baron of the Irish Exchequer
- In office 2 July 1782 – 1783
- Monarch: George III
- Prime Minister: The Marquess of Rockingham; The Earl of Shelburne
- Preceded by: James Dennis
- Succeeded by: Barry Yelverton

Prime Serjeant of Ireland
- In office June 1782 – July 1782
- Prime Minister: The Marquess of Rockingham
- Preceded by: James Browne
- Succeeded by: Thomas Kelly
- In office 24 July 1777 – 1779
- Prime Minister: Lord North
- Preceded by: James Dennis
- Succeeded by: James Browne

Member of Parliament for Dublin University
- In office 1776–1782 Serving with Richard Hely-Hutchinson and John FitzGibbon
- Preceded by: Philip Tisdall
- Succeeded by: Lawrence Parsons

Member of Parliament for Athy
- In office 1769–1776 Serving with William de Burgh
- Preceded by: Robert Sandford; William Smith
- Succeeded by: Thomas Burgh; Thomas Burgh (1744–1810)

Personal details
- Born: Walter Hussey; 1742 County Kildare, Ireland
- Died: 1783 (aged 40–41) Armagh, Ireland
- Party: Irish Patriot Party
- Spouse: Anne de Burgh (m. 1767; died 1782)
- Children: 6
- Parents: Ignatius Hussey; Elizabeth Burgh
- Relatives: Thomas Burgh (uncle); Richard Burgh (uncle); Thomas de Burgh (grandfather)
- Education: Trinity College Dublin (BA)

Walter Hussey Burgh SL (English: /ˈbɜːr/; BER; 1742 – 1783) was an Irish statesman, barrister and judge who sat in the Irish House of Commons, served as Prime Serjeant (1777–79, 1782) and Chief Baron of the Irish Exchequer (1782–83). He was considered to be one of the most outstanding orators of his time.

== Background ==
Hussey Burgh was born in County Kildare, son of Ignatius Hussey, barrister, of Donore House, near Naas, and his second wife, Elizabeth Burgh. Elizabeth was the daughter of the statesman and architect, Colonel Thomas de Burgh, and his wife Mary Smyth. Thomas Burgh designed some of the most notable Irish buildings of his era, including Trinity College Library. Walter adopted the extra surname Burgh as a condition of inheriting the Burgh estate at Drumkeen, County Limerick, from his uncle, Richard Burgh. Another influential family connection was Anthony Foster, one of Burgh's predecessors as Chief Baron of the Irish Exchequer: both of Foster's wives were members of the Burgh family.

== Career ==
Hussey Burgh was educated at Mr. Young's school in Abbey Street, Dublin, and then at Trinity College Dublin, where he graduated with a Bachelor of Arts in 1762; he was an accomplished classical scholar, and had some reputation as a poet. After studying at the Temple, he was called to the Bar in 1769 and, within a few years, became one of its leaders: the speed of his rise to the top was described as unprecedented. He entered the Irish House of Commons in the same year, sitting first for Athy (1769–76) and later for the University of Dublin (1776–82). He was a member of the popular drinking club, the Monks of the Screw.

In Parliament, he was a close associate of Henry Grattan, and a supporter of Grattan's "free trade" programme; he became legendary for his oratory in support of the Irish Patriot Party. At the same time, he prided himself on his independence of mind, preferring not to pledge support for any particular policy until he had examined its merits. He acquired, as his patron, Philip Tisdall (the immensely influential Attorney General for Ireland) who called him "the most promising of the rising young men".

At Tisdall's request, Hussey Burgh was appointed Prime Serjeant (1777) and made a member of the Privy Council of Ireland. He resigned the office in 1779, in protest at the continuing restrictions on free trade, after making his celebrated speech "England has sown her laws as dragon's teeth". Friends said that he was too independent to be happy as a Government spokesman: cynics said that his failure to get a peerage explained much of his dissatisfaction. After the removal of the restrictions, he agreed to accept office again and was re-appointed Prime Serjeant in June 1782. A month later, in July 1782 he was appointed Chief Baron of the Irish Exchequer, but he died the following year while holding the assizes in Armagh, reportedly from gaol fever.

== Speeches ==
Hussey Burgh was regarded as one of the greatest Irish orators of his time, but his speeches survive only in fragments. Memorable sayings of Burgh include:

- "Talk not to me of peace. Ireland is not at peace, it is smothered war. England has sown her laws as dragon's teeth, and they have sprung up as armed men."
- "Our members are returned by the fear or dependence, not the affection or choice of the electoral body. Unaccountable for their conduct in Parliament, their venality is unrestrained and universal corruption reigns in the House."
- "I never will support any Government in fraudulently concealing from the King the rights of his people."

== Character ==
Hussey Burgh seems to have been universally liked: "mild, moderate and patriotic...friendly to a fault, and disinterested to a weakness...honest without affluence and ambitious without corruption".

His principal fault, it was generally agreed, was his extravagance: he lived in considerable state, and liked to be driven to Court in a carriage with six horses and three outriders. He also undertook extensive rebuilding of Donore House. As a result of his improvidence, his early death left his children in serious financial difficulty, until Henry Grattan persuaded the House of Commons to vote them a pension.

== Family ==
In 1767, Walter Hussey married his second cousin, Anne de Burgh (died 1782), daughter of Thomas Burgh and Anne Downes, and sister of the statesman William de Burgh. They had one son and five daughters, including Catherine (1770–1840), who married Sir John Macartney, 1st Baronet, and Mary (died 1820), who married Richard Griffith. Their descendants included Arthur Hill Griffith, the politician Hussey Burgh Macartney, first Dean of Melbourne, and John Arthur Macartney, a colonist of Queensland.

== See also ==
- House of Burgh, an Anglo-Norman and Hiberno-Norman dynasty founded in 1193

Parliament of Ireland
Preceded by Philip Tisdall	Member of Parliament for Dublin University; 1776–1782; With: Richard Hely-Hutchinson and John FitzGibbon	Succeeded by Lawrence Parsons
Preceded by Robert Sandford; William Smith	Member of Parliament for Athy; 1769–1776; With: William de Burgh	Succeeded by Thomas Burgh; Thomas Burgh (1744–1810)
Political offices
Preceded by James Dennis	Chief Baron of the Irish Exchequer; 1782–1783	Succeeded by Barry Yelverton
Preceded by James Browne	Prime Serjeant of Ireland; June–July 1782	Succeeded by Thomas Kelly
Preceded by James Dennis	Prime Serjeant of Ireland; 1777–1779	Succeeded by James Browne
