= Killybegs (Parliament of Ireland constituency) =

Pre-1801 Irish constituency

- Former borough constituency for the Irish House of Commons
- County: County Donegal
- Borough: Killybegs

1616–1801
- Seats: 2
- Replaced by: Disfranchised

Killybegs was a constituency represented in the Irish House of Commons until 1800.

== History ==
In the Patriot Parliament of 1689 summoned by James II, Killybegs was not represented.

== Members of Parliament, 1616–1801 ==
=== 1689–1801 ===
- 1634–1635 Thomas Tallys and James Galbraith
- 1639–1649 Edward Tarleton and Thomas Tallys
- 1661 Sir Robert Murray and William Knight (sat for Belfast - replaced by Thomas Burton. Burton AWOL-replaced 1665 by Sir John Lyndon)

Election	First MP	Second MP	
1689	Killybegs was not represented in the Patriot Parliament		
1692	Henry Conyngham	Thomas Smith	
1695	Charles Hamilton	Charles Melvyn	
1703	Charles Hamilton	Benjamin Parry	
1710	Thomas Pearson	Benjamin Parry	
1713	Thomas Pearson	Henry Maxwell	Whig
1715	Thomas Pearson	Charles Fane	
1719	Thomas Pearson	Robert Colvill	
1727	William Conyngham	Henry Conyngham	
1739	Leslie Corry	Henry Conyngham	
1741	Henry Conyngham	Henry Conyngham	
1749	Henry Gore	Henry Conyngham	
1753	Henry Gore	Francis Pierpoint Burton	
1761	Richard Jones	William Gerard Hamilton	
1768	Henry Hamilton (Note: Created a baronet in 1775)	Thomas Allan	
1776	Henry Hamilton	William Burton (Note: Also elected for Ennis in 1776, for which he chose to sit)	
1777	Henry Hamilton	John Knox (Note: Styles as The Honourable from 1781)	
October 1783	William Burton Conyngham	James FitzGerald (Note: Also elected for Tulsk in 1783, for which he chose to sit)	Patriot
1783	William Burton Conyngham	William Colvill	
May 1790	Francis Nathaniel Burton (Note: Also elected for County Clare in 1790, for which he chose to sit)	John Wolfe	
1790	Sir Henry Cavendish, 2nd Bt	John Wolfe	
January 1798	Francis Nathaniel Burton (Note: Also elected for County Clare in 1798, for which he chose to sit.)	Richard Archdall	
1798	Francis McNamara	Richard Archdall	
1801	Disenfranchised		

== Bibliography ==
- O'Hart, John (2007). The Irish and Anglo-Irish Landed Gentry: When Cromwell came to Ireland. Vol. II. Heritage Books. ISBN 0-7884-1927-7.
- Leigh Rayment's historical List of Members of the Irish House of Commons. Cites: Johnston-Liik, Edith Mary (2002). The History of the Irish Parliament 1692-1800 (6 volumes). Ulster Historical Foundation.
