= Thomas Caulfield =

Thomas Caulfield or Caulfeild may refer to:

- Thomas Caulfeild (lieutenant governor) (1685–1717), also spelt Caulfield, British lieutenant governor of Nova Scotia
- Thomas Caulfield (actor) (1766–1815), British actor
- Thomas J. Caulfield (1939–2007), American architect
- Thomas Caulfeild (Irish politician)

== See also ==
- Thomas Caulfield Irwin, Irish poet, writer, and classical scholar
