= Richard Warren (Irish politician) =

Irish politician

Richard Warren (died 6 February 1735) was an Irish politician.

Warren served as the Member of Parliament for Kildare Borough in the Irish House of Commons between 1716 and his death in 1735.

Parliament of Ireland
Preceded by James Barry; Maurice Keating	Member of Parliament for Kildare Borough; 1716–1735; With: James Barry (1716–1725); Maurice Keating (1725–1727); Robert Dixon (1727–1732); John Digby (1732–1735)	Succeeded by John Digby; Robert Downes
