= Thomas Allan (politician) =

Irish politician

Thomas Allan (1725–1798) was an Irish politician.

Allan sat in the Irish House of Commons as the Member of Parliament for Killybegs between 1768 and 1776. In 1773 he was appointed Commissioner for Revenue in Ireland. He then represented Naas from 1777 to 1783. Between 1778 and 1785 Allan served as Commissioner of Customs in England.

Parliament of Ireland
Preceded by Richard Jones; William Gerard Hamilton	Member of Parliament for Killybegs; 1768–1776; With: Henry Hamilton	Succeeded by Henry Hamilton; William Burton
Preceded by John Bourke; John Bourke	Member of Parliament for Naas; 1778–1785; With: John Bourke	Succeeded by John Bourke; Hugh Carleton
