= Nicholas Jones (politician) =

Irish politician

Nicholas Jones (died 1695) was an Irish politician.

Jones represented Naas in the Irish House of Commons between 1692 and 1693.

Parliament of Ireland
Preceded by Patriot Parliament	Member of Parliament for Naas; 1692–1693; With: John Aylmer	Succeeded by Richard Nevill; James Barry
