= Alexander Gradon =

Irish politician

Alexander Gradon (circa 1666 – May 1739), also spelt Graydon, was an Irish politician.

Gradon represented Naas in the Irish House of Commons between 1703 and 1711. He then sat for Harristown from 1713 to 1714, and again from 1715 to 1727.

In 1731, a man named Alexander Graydon was arrested for abetting a violent assault on Naas MP John Bourke. According to Eugene L. Wolfe, it is possible but not certain that this was the same man.

Parliament of Ireland
Preceded by Richard Nevill; James Barry	Member of Parliament for Naas; 1703–1711; With: Francis Spring (1703–1711); James Barry (1711–1713)	Succeeded by Thomas Burgh; Theobald Bourke
Preceded by Richard FitzPatrick; Robert Dixon	Member of Parliament for Harristown; 1711–1713; With: Benjamin Chetwood (1713–1714); Robert Johnson (1715–1721); Sir Walter Borrowes, Bt. (1721–1727)	Succeeded by Edward Stratford; John Graydon
