= Richard Gorges-Meredyth =

Anglo-Irish politician and baronet

Sir Richard Gorges-Meredyth, 1st Baronet (7 May 1735 – September 1821) was an Anglo-Irish politician and baronet.

Born Richard Gorges, son and heir of Hamilton Gorges, MP for Swords. On his marriage in 1775 to Mary, daughter and heir of Arthur Meredyth, he assumed the additional name of Meredyth before that of Gorges.

Gorges-Meredyth represented Enniskillen in the Irish House of Commons between 1768 and 1776. In 1787 he was created a Baronet, of Catharines Grove in the Baronetage of Ireland. He sat in the Commons for Naas from 1787 to 1790.

He died without male issue, when his title became extinct. He was the grandfather of William Somerville, 1st Baron Athlumney.

Parliament of Ireland
Preceded by Hon. William Cole; Richard Gorges	Member of Parliament for Enniskillen; 1768–76; With: Richard Gorges (1768); Armar Lowry (1768–1769); Bernard Smyth Ward (1769–1771); Hugh Henry Mitchell (1771–1776)	Succeeded by Sir Archibald Acheson, Bt. John Leigh
Preceded by John Bourke; Hugh Carleton	Member of Parliament for Naas; 1787–90; With: John Bourke	Succeeded by John Bourke; John Bourke
Baronetage of Ireland
New creation	Baronet (of Catharines Grove); 1787–1821	Extinct
