= Richard Nevill =

Irish politician

Richard Nevill (1654–1720) was an Irish politician.

He was the eldest son of Richard Nevill and his wife Margaret Ussher. He inherited the country house of Furness, where he afterwards lived, on the death of his father in 1682.

In 1692 he was elected Sovereign of Naas (i.e. Mayor of the town) and appointed High Sheriff of Kildare. He became Recorder of Naas.

Nevill represented Naas in the Irish House of Commons between 1695 and 1703.

On his death in 1720 Furness passed to Richard Nevill, an Army Officer.

Parliament of Ireland
Preceded by John Aylmer; Nicholas Jones	Member of Parliament for Naas; 1695–1703; With: James Barry	Succeeded by Alexander Gradon; Francis Spring
