= John McCartney =

John McCartney may refer to:

- John McCartney (footballer, born 1866) (1866–1933), Scottish player and manager whose career lasted from 1884 to 1929
- John McCartney (footballer, born 1870) (1870–1942), Scottish player for Liverpool; his career ended in 1898
- John McCartney, fictional grandfather of Paul McCartney, played by Wilfrid Brambell in A Hard Day's Night

== See also ==
- John Macartney (disambiguation)
