= Theobald Bourke (Irish MP) =

Irish politician (c. 1683–1726)

Theobald Bourke (circa 1683 – June 1726) was an Irish politician.

Bourke served as a Member of Parliament in the Irish House of Commons, representing Naas between 1713 and his death in 1726. His relation, John Bourke, took the vacant seat.

Parliament of Ireland
Preceded by Alexander Gradon; James Barry	Member of Parliament for Naas; 1713–1726; With: Thomas Burgh	Succeeded by Thomas Burgh; John Bourke
