= Earl of Mayo =

Title in the Peerage of Ireland

Earldom of Mayo Iarla Mhaigh Eo
- Arms: Per fess Or and Ermine, a Cross Gules, in the 1st quarter a Lion rampant, in the 2nd a dexter Hand erect, couped at the wrist, both Sable. Crest: A Cat-a-Mountain sejant guardant proper, collared and chained Or. Supporters: On either side a Chevalier in complete Armour, holding in the exterior hand a Pole-Axe, all proper.
- Creation date: 24 June 1785
- Created by: George III
- Peerage: Peerage of Ireland
- First holder: John Bourke, 1st Viscount Mayo
- Present holder: Charles Bourke, 11th Earl of Mayo
- Heir apparent: Richard Thomas Bourke, Lord Naas
- Remainder to: the 1st earl's body heirs male of the body lawfully begotten
- Subsidiary titles: Viscount Mayo; Baron Naas
- Seat: Derryinver
- Former seats: Palmerstown House, County Kildare
- Motto: A CRUCE SALUS (Salvation from the Cross)

Earl of the County of Mayo, usually known simply as Earl of Mayo (Irish: Iarla Mhaigh Eo), is a title in the Peerage of Ireland created, in 1785, for John Bourke, 1st Viscount Mayo (of the second creation). For many years he served as "First Commissioner of Revenue" in Ireland. He had already been created Baron Naas (/neɪs/ NAYSS), of Naas in the county of Kildare, in 1776, and Viscount Mayo, of Moneycrower in the county of Mayo, in 1781, also in the Peerage of Ireland.

This branch of the Bourke family descends from John Bourke, fourth son of Sir Thomas Bourke (died 1397), whose second son Edmund was the ancestor of the Viscounts Mayo (of the first creation). Before becoming Viscounts and Earls of Mayo, the senior branch of the family held the Gaelic title Mac William Íochtar (Lower Mac William) and received the White Rod. The Earls of Clanricarde (Mac William Uachtar/Upper Mac William) were members of another branch of the de Burgh dynasty.

Lord Mayo was succeeded by his eldest son John, 2nd Earl, who was a member of the Irish House of Commons. On his death the titles passed to his younger brother, the third Earl. He was a prominent Anglican clergyman and served as Bishop of Leighlin from 1772 to 1782 and as Archbishop of Tuam from 1782 to 1794. He was succeeded by his eldest son, the fourth Earl who sat in the House of Lords as an Irish representative peer from 1816 to 1849. On his death, the titles passed to his nephew, the fifth Earl who was also an Irish representative peer in the House of Lords from 1852 to 1867.

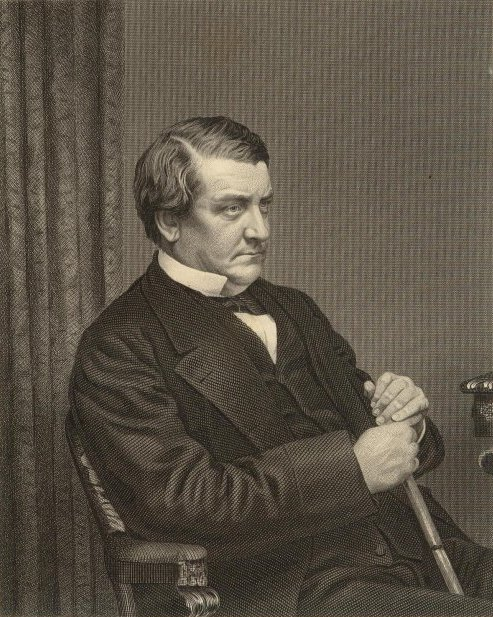
The 6th Earl of Mayo was Viceroy and Governor-General of India until his assassination in 1872.

His eldest son, Richard, 6th Earl, was a prominent Conservative politician. Known for most of his life under his courtesy title of Lord Naas, he was three times Chief Secretary for Ireland and served as Viceroy and Governor-General of India from 1869 to 1872, when he was assassinated on the Andaman Islands. He was succeeded by his eldest son, the seventh Earl who sat in the House of Lords as an Irish representative peer from 1890 to 1927 and was a Member of the Senate of the Irish Free State from 1922 to 1927. This line of the family expired on his death in 1927 and the titles passed to the late Earl's first cousin, the eighth Earl. He was the son of the Reverend The Hon. George Wingfield Bourke (the fourth son of the fifth Earl). He was succeeded by his eldest son, the ninth Earl. On his death in 1962, the peerages passed to his nephew, the tenth Earl. He was the only son of the Hon. Bryan Longley Bourke (third son of the eighth Earl). The tenth Earl was involved in British politics and unsuccessfully contested South Dorset in the 1964 general election as a Liberal. As of 2017, the titles are held by his eldest son, the eleventh Earl, who succeeded in 2006. The present Earl was educated at Portora Royal School, Enniskillen, Queen's University Belfast and Dublin Institute of Technology, Dublin. Lord Mayo is a marble specialist like his father, whose children are Roman Catholics, reverting to pre-peerage family tradition.

Several other members of the Bourke (pronounced "Burke") family have also gained distinction. The Right Reverend The Hon. Richard Bourke, second son of the third Earl and father of the fifth Earl, was Bishop of Waterford and Lismore. The Hon. John Jocelyn Bourke (1823–1904), second son of the fifth Earl, was a lieutenant-general in the Army. The Hon. Robert Bourke was a Conservative politician and was created Baron Connemara in 1887. Sir George Deane Bourke, grandson of Reverend the Hon. George Theobald Bourke, fourth son of the third Earl, was a major-general in the Army.

The courtesy title of Lord Mayo's eldest son and heir is Lord Naas (/neɪs/ NAYSS; pronounced "Nace").

The family seat is Derryinver, near Clifden, County Galway. The ancient family seat was in Palmerstown, County Kildare, where the 7th Earl built Palmerstown House in 1872 to honour his father after his assassination. It was burned by Irish Republicans in 1923, but later repaired and sold, and is currently a hotel.

== Earls of Mayo (1785) ==
Other titles: Viscount Mayo, of Moneycrower, in the County of Mayo (Ireland, 1781); Baron Naas, of Naas, in the County of Kildare (Ireland, 1776)

- John Bourke, 1st Earl of Mayo (c. 1705–1790)
- John Bourke, 2nd Earl of Mayo (1729–1792)
- Joseph Deane Bourke, 3rd Earl of Mayo (1736–1794)
- John Bourke, 4th Earl of Mayo (1766–1849)
- Robert Bourke, 5th Earl of Mayo (1797–1867)
- Richard Southwell Bourke, 6th Earl of Mayo (1822–1872)
- Dermot Robert Wyndham Bourke, 7th Earl of Mayo (1851–1927)
- Walter Longley Bourke, 8th Earl of Mayo (1859–1939)
- Ulick Henry Bourke, 9th Earl of Mayo (1890–1962)
- Terence Patrick Bourke, 10th Earl of Mayo (1929–2006)
- Charles Diarmuidh John Bourke, 11th Earl of Mayo (born 1953)

== Present peer ==
Charles Diarmuidh John Bourke, 11th Earl of Mayo (born 11 June 1953) is the eldest son of the 10th Earl and his first wife, Margaret Jane Robinson Harrison. He was formally known as Lord Naas between 1962 and 2006 and was educated at Portora Royal School, Enniskillen, and Queen's University, Belfast.

On 22 September 2006, he succeeded his father as Earl of Mayo, Viscount Mayo of Monycrower, and Baron Naas of Naas.

In 1975 he married firstly Marie Antoinette Cronnelly; they were divorced in 1979. In 1985 he married secondly Marie Veronica Mannion. With his first wife he has one daughter:

- Lady Corinne Mary Jane Bourke (born 1975)

With his second wife he has two sons:

- Richard Thomas Bourke, Lord Naas (born 7 December 1985), heir apparent to the earldom and other titles.
- Hon Eoin Patrick Bourke (born 1989)

== See also ==
- House of Burgh, an Anglo-Norman and Hiberno-Norman dynasty founded in 1193
- Mac William Íochtar (Lower Mac William)
- Viscount Mayo
- Marquess of Sligo
- Baron Connemara
- Carter-Campbell of Possil
