= William Burton Conyngham =

Anglo-Irish politician (1733–1796)

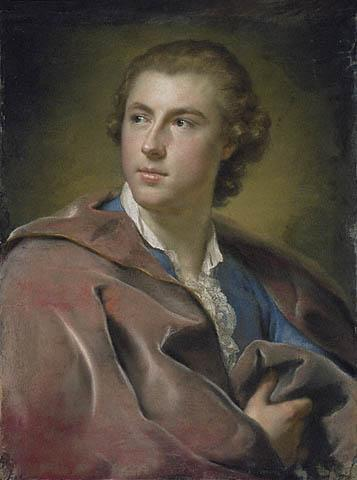
- portrait by Anton Raphael Mengs (1754/1755)

Member of the Parliament of Ireland
- In office 1761–1796

Personal details
- Born: 1733
- Died: 31 May 1796 (aged 62–63)
- Parent: Francis Burton (father)

William Burton Conyngham (1733 – 31 May 1796) was an Anglo-Irish politician.

== Life ==
He was born William Burton, the second son of Francis Burton and Mary Conyngham, sister of Henry Conyngham, 1st Earl Conyngham. In 1781, his name was changed by Royal Licence to inherit the estates of his uncle.

He was a student at Queens' College, Cambridge from 1750 and in turn at Lincoln's Inn from 1753, he then proceeded to follow a military career, being commissioned as a Captain in 1759, and by 1769 he had advanced to Lieutenant-Colonel in the 12th Dragoons. He resigned his Regular Army commission in 1774, but in April 1793 he was appointed Colonel to raise and command the new Prince of Wales's Own Donegal Militia.

Conyngham was a longtime Member of Parliament. From 1761 to 1777 he represented Newtown Limavady, from 1776 to 1777 as well as from 1783 to 1790 Killybegs. Between 1776 and 1783 and again between 1790 and 1796, he sat in the Irish House of Commons for Ennis.

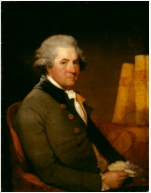
by Gilbert Stuart circa 1792

Conyngham planned a settlement on the previously unpopulated island of Rutland, Ireland, having installed, from 1784, a street of residences and business premises, post office, school house and a fish landing and processing facility. The island remained inhabited into the 1960s. The village which developed around the mainland pier which served Rutland, Burtonport, still bears his name.

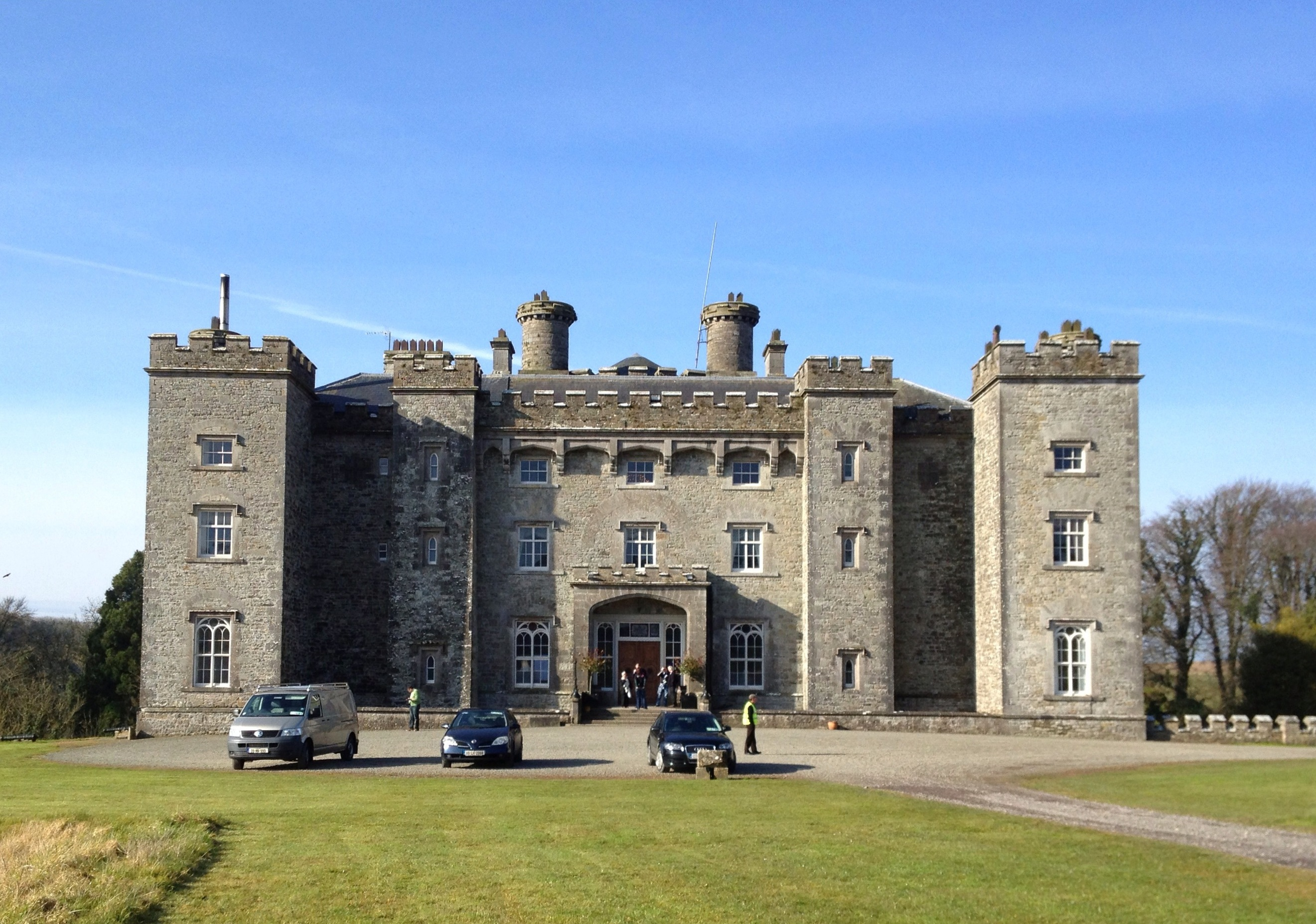
Slane Castle, County Meath

In 1785 Conyngham commenced the building of Slane Castle, assisted by his nephew the 1st Marquess Conyngham, on a site overlooking the River Boyne just a few kilometres upstream from the site of the Battle of the Boyne.

From 1793 Conyngham was one of the Commissioners of the Treasury for Ireland.

Conyngham is most famous today for having presented the Trinity College Harp to Trinity College Dublin; from 1922 the harp was used as the model for the insignia of the Irish Free State and the Republic of Ireland. An image was also registered as a Guinness trade mark in 1876.

Parliament of Ireland
| Preceded by Alexander Nesbitt; Edmond Leslie-Corry | Member of Parliament for Newtown Limavady; 1761–1777; With: Edmond Leslie-Corry 1761–1765; John Staples 1765–1768; Richard Jones 1768–1776; Alexander Murray 1776–1777 | Succeeded by William Colvill; Alexander Murray |
| Preceded by Thomas Allan; Sir Henry Hamilton, 1st Bt | Member of Parliament for Killybegs; 1776–1777; With: Sir Henry Hamilton, 1st Bt | Succeeded by John Knox; Sir Henry Hamilton, 1st Bt |
| Preceded by Charles McDonnell; Crofton Vandeleur | Member of Parliament for Ennis; 1776–1783; With: Sir Lucius O'Brien, 3rd Bt 1776–1778; Francis Bernard 1778–1783 | Succeeded by Stewart Weldon; John Thomas Foster |
| Preceded by Hon. John Knox; Sir Henry Hamilton, 1st Bt | Member of Parliament for Killybegs; 1783–1790; With: James FitzGerald 1783; William Colvill 1783–1790 | Succeeded by John Wolfe; Francis Nathaniel Burton |
| Preceded by Stewart Weldon; John Thomas Foster | Member of Parliament for Ennis; 1790–1796; With: Sir Lucius O'Brien, 3rd Bt 1790–1795; Sir Edward O'Brien, 4th Bt 1795–1796 | Succeeded by Sir Edward O'Brien, 4th Bt; Lodge Evans Morres |
