= Frederick Henniker =

Sir Frederick Henniker, 2nd Baronet (1 November 1793 – 6 August 1825) was a traveller and writer.

== Family and friends ==
He was the eldest son of the Hon. Sir Brydges Henniker, 1st Baronet of Newton Hall in Great Dunmow by his wife Mary, eldest daughter of William Press, and a grandson of John Henniker, 1st Baron Henniker. He was educated at Eton and at St. John's College, Cambridge, where he graduated B.A. in 1815. He succeeded his father as second baronet on 3 July 1816.

Scientist and inventor Francis Ronalds, who had a similar sense of adventure and wit, was one of his friends. Henniker’s uncle John, 2nd Lord Henniker FRS was a scientific mentor to Ronalds, and had viewed his pioneering electric telegraph in operation.

== Travels ==
In the period 1818–21 Henniker travelled through France and Italy to Malta, and thence to Alexandria, Upper Egypt and Nubia. After revisiting Cairo he went to Mount Sinai and Jerusalem, returning home by Smyrna, Athens, Constantinople, and Vienna. While on his way from Jerusalem to Jericho he was severely wounded by banditti, and left stark naked. He had met up with Ronalds in Sicily but not, as planned, in Egypt, Ronalds being delayed by financial and passport issues.

In 1823 Henniker published an account of his travels and a second edition appeared, with a slightly altered title, in the following year. Ronalds assisted with the draft and in analysing objects Henniker had brought home. Some of Henniker’s sketches and notes are held in the Ronalds Archive at the Institution of Engineering and Technology.

== Politics ==
In the spring of 1825 he canvassed Reading with a view of contesting that borough in the event of a dissolution, but withdrew his candidature, and died soon after in the Albany, Piccadilly, in the thirty-second year of his age. He was buried at Great Dunmow, Essex. He was unmarried, and was succeeded in the baronetcy by his brother, the Hon. and Rev. Sir Augustus Brydges Henniker, 3rd Baronet.

Baronetage of the United Kingdom
Preceded by Brydges Henniker	Baronet (of Newton Hall); 1816–1825	Succeeded by Augustus Henniker
