= William McCartney =

William, Bill, Billy or Willie McCartney can refer to:

- Bill McCartney (1940–2025), American football coach, and evangelist
- Billy McCartney (born 1947), Scottish footballer
- William McCartney (footballer), Scottish footballer (fl. 1902–1903)
- Willie McCartney (died 1948), Scottish football manager
- William John McCartney or John McCartney (1866–1933), British footballer

== See also ==
- William Macartney (disambiguation)
- William McCartney Davidson (1872–1942), Canadian journalist, politician, and author
