= Thomas Burgh (died 1759) =

Irish politician (1707–59)

Member of Parliament for Naas
- In office 1731–1759 Serving with John Bourke
- Preceded by: Thomas Burgh; John Bourke
- Succeeded by: Richard Burgh; John Bourke

Personal details
- Born: 1707
- Died: 1759 (aged 51–52)
- Parent(s): Thomas Burgh; Mary Smyth
- Relatives: Richard Burgh (brother); Walter Hussey Burgh (nephew)

Thomas Burgh (English: /ˈbɜːr/; BER; 1707 – 23 June 1759) was an Irish politician who was MP for Naas (1731–1759).

== Biography ==
Burgh was the son of the military engineer and architect Colonel Thomas Burgh MP and Mary Smyth. He represented Naas as a Member of Parliament in the Irish House of Commons between 1731 and his death in 1759. His successor as MP was his younger brother, Richard Burgh.

== See also ==
- House of Burgh, an Anglo-Norman and Hiberno-Norman dynasty founded in 1193

Parliament of Ireland
Preceded by Thomas Burgh; John Bourke	Member of Parliament for Naas; 1731–1759; With: John Bourke	Succeeded by Richard Burgh; John Bourke
