= John Bourke, 1st Earl of Mayo =

Irish politician and peer (c.1705–1790)

The Right Honourable The Earl of Mayo

Member of the Irish House of Lords
- Hereditary Peerage; 13 January 1781 – 1790
- Preceded by: New Creation
- Succeeded by: John Bourke

Member of Parliament for Naas
- In office 1768–1776 Serving with John Bourke
- Preceded by: John Bourke; Maurice Keating
- Succeeded by: John Bourke; Thomas Allan
- In office 1727–1760 Serving with: Thomas Burgh; Thomas Burgh; Richard Burgh
- Preceded by: Thomas Burgh; Theobald Bourke
- Succeeded by: Richard Burgh; Maurice Keating

Member of Parliament for Old Leighlin
- In office 1761–1768 Serving with: Francis Andrews; Edward Nicholson
- Preceded by: Richard Rigby; Thomas Carter
- Succeeded by: Sir FitzGerald Aylmer, Bt.; Thomas Monck

Personal details
- Born: John Bourke; 1705
- Died: 1790 (aged 84–85)
- Spouse: Mary Deane (m. 1726–1774)
- Children: 3, including: John Bourke, 2nd Earl of Mayo
- Parents: Richard Bourke; Catherine Minchin
- Education: Trinity College, Dublin

John Bourke, 1st Earl of Mayo (English: /bɜːrk/; BURK; circa 1705 – 1790), styled Lord Naas (/neɪs/; NAYSS) from 1775 to 1781 and Viscount Mayo from 1781 to 1785, was an Irish politician and peer who was MP for Naas (1727–60, 1768–72) and Old Leighlin (1760–68) and was created Earl of Mayo (1785).

== Early life ==
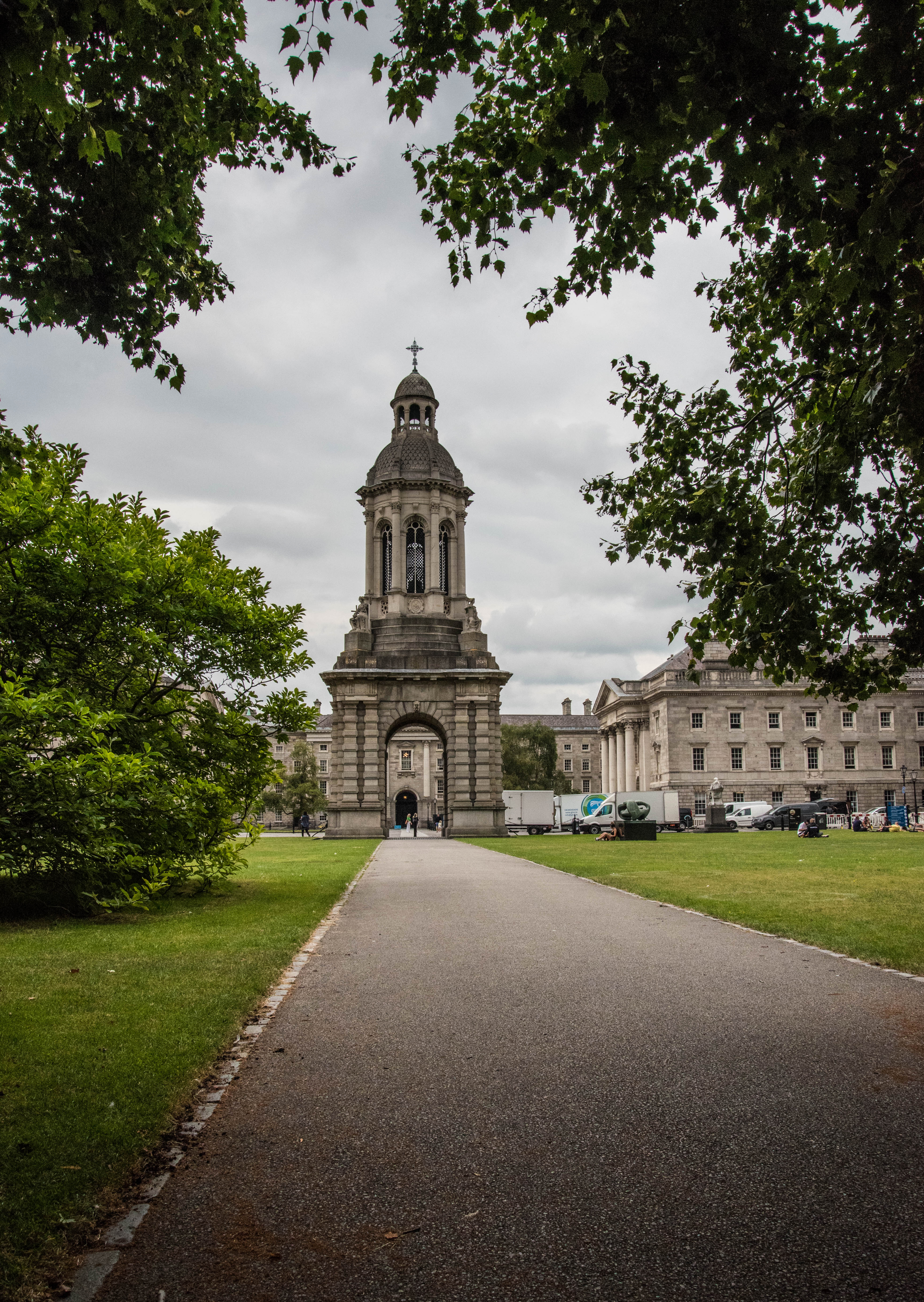
Trinity College, Dublin.

He was the son of Richard Bourke (d.1727) and Catherine Minchin, daughter of Charles Minchin of Ballynakill, County Tipperary. He was descended from Gaelic nobles, and shared a common ancestor with Tibbot ne Long Bourke, 1st Viscount Mayo. He was educated at Trinity College, Dublin.

== Career ==
In 1727, he was elected as the Member of Parliament for Naas, representing the seat in the Irish House of Commons until 1760. During this time he was the victim of at least one violent assault when in 1731 the Commons ordered the arrest of a man who had accosted Bourke with a pistol and threatened his life. Another man, who may have been former Naas MP Alexander Gradon, was accused of encouraging the attack.

Between 1761 and 1768 he served as MP for Old Leighlin. He was re-elected for Naas in 1768, and held the seat until his elevation to the peerage in 1776. That year was created Baron Naas, of Naas in the County of Kildare, in the Peerage of Ireland. He assumed his seat in the Irish House of Lords, and on 13 January 1781 he was made Viscount Mayo, a title which had previously been held by his distant relations. On 24 June 1785 Bourke was made Earl of Mayo.

== Family ==
Bourke married Mary Deane (d.1774), daughter of Joseph Deane and Margaret Boyle, in 1726. Together they had three children. The Naas constituency was also represented by Bourke's son and grandson, the second and fourth earls.

== Arms ==
Coat of arms of John Bourke, 1st Earl of Mayo
Crest A Cat-a-Mountain sejant guardant proper, collared and chained Or. Escutcheon Party per fess Or and Ermine, a cross gules the first quarter charged with a lion rampant sable and the second with a dexter hand couped at the wrist and erect gules Supporters On either side a Chevalier in complete Armour, holding in the exterior hand a Pole-Axe, all proper. Motto A CRUCE SALUS (Salvation from the Cross)

== Ancestry ==
Ancestors of John Bourke, 1st Earl of Mayo

8. Theobald Bourke
4. John Bourke
2. Richard Bourke
10. Mayler Fay
5. Catherine Fay
11. Unknown Davys
1. John Bourke, 1st Earl of Mayo
12. John Minchin
6. Charles Minchin
13. Mary Walcot
3. Catherine Minchin
7. Elizabeth Paulet

== See also ==
- House of Burgh, an Anglo-Norman and Hiberno-Norman dynasty founded in 1193

Parliament of Ireland
Preceded by Thomas Burgh; Theobald Bourke	Member of Parliament for Naas; 1727–1760; With: Thomas Burgh 1727–1731; Thomas Burgh 1731–1759; Richard Burgh 1759–1760	Succeeded by Richard Burgh; Maurice Keating
Preceded by Richard Rigby; Thomas Carter	Member of Parliament for Old Leighlin; 1761–1768; With: Francis Andrews 1761; Edward Nicholson 1761–1768	Succeeded by Sir FitzGerald Aylmer, Bt. Thomas Monck
Preceded by John Bourke; Maurice Keating	Member of Parliament for Naas; 1768–1776; With: John Bourke 1727–1731	Succeeded by John Bourke; Thomas Allan
Peerage of Ireland
New creation	Earl of Mayo; 1785–1790	Succeeded by John Bourke
New creation	Viscount Mayo; 1781–1790	Succeeded by John Bourke
New creation	Baron Naas; 1776–1790	Succeeded by John Bourke
