= John Bourke, 4th Earl of Mayo =

Irish politician and peer (1766–1849)

The Right Honourable The Earl of Mayo GCH PC (Ire)

Member of the House of Lords
- Lord Temporal
- Representative Peer of Ireland; 2 March 1816 – 23 May 1849
- Preceded by: The Earl of Wicklow
- Succeeded by: The Earl of Lanesborough

Member of the Irish House of Lords
- Hereditary Peerage; 20 August 1794 – 1 January 1801
- Preceded by: Joseph Bourke
- Succeeded by: Abolition

Member of Parliament for Naas
- In office 1790–1794 Serving with: John Bourke, Lord Naas; James Bond
- Preceded by: John Bourke, Lord Naas; Sir Richard Gorges-Meredyth, 1st Bt
- Succeeded by: Sir James Bond, 1st Bt; George Damer, Viscount Milton

Personal details
- Born: John Bourke; 18 June 1766
- Died: 23 May 1849 (aged 82) Bersted Lodge, Sussex
- Spouse: Arabella Mackworth-Praed (m. 1792–1843)
- Children: None
- Parents: Joseph Deane Bourke, 3rd Earl of Mayo; Elizabeth Meade
- Relatives: Richard Bourke (brother)
- Education: Christ Church, Oxford
- Military career
- Allegiance: United Kingdom
- Branch: British Army
- Rank: Colonel
- Unit: Kilkenny Militia

John Bourke, 4th Earl of Mayo, (English: /bɜːrk/; BURK; 18 June 1766 – 23 May 1849) was an Irish peer and courtier, styled Lord Naas (/neɪs/; NAYSS) from 1792 to 1794, who served as Chairman of Committees in the Irish House of Lords until 1801.

== Career ==
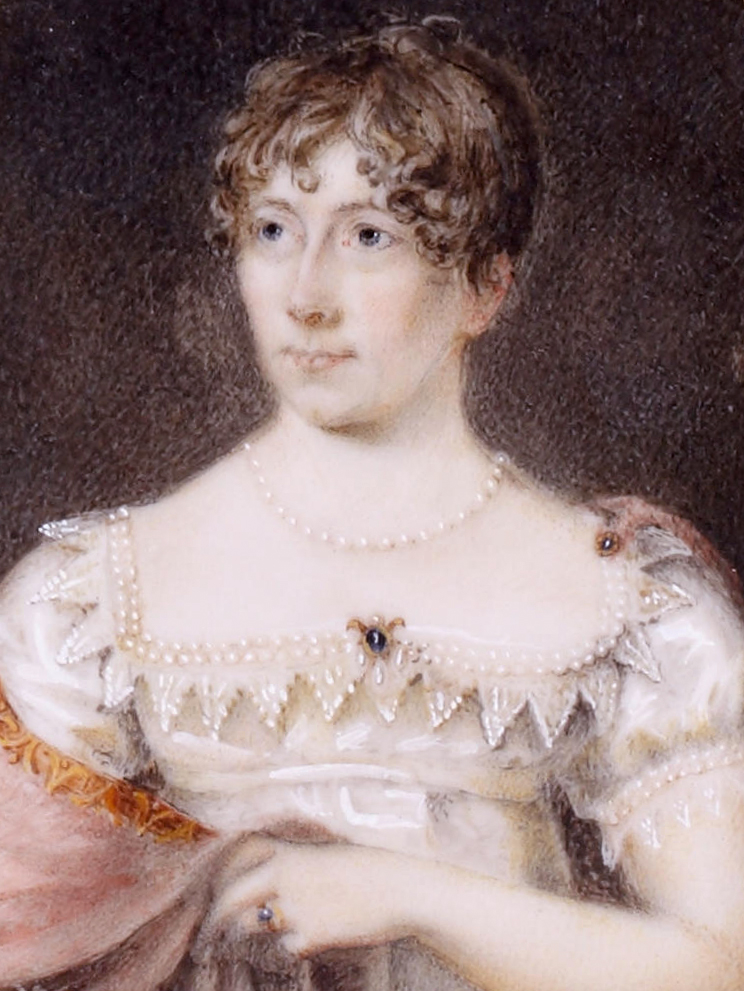
Arabella Bourke (English School, circa 1810)

He was the eldest son of Joseph Deane Bourke, 3rd Earl of Mayo (Archbishop of Tuam 1782–94) and his wife, Elizabeth, daughter of Sir Richard Meade, 3rd Baronet.

He was educated at Christ Church, Oxford from 1784, and later became a D.C.L. (1793). He also served as Colonel of the Kilkenny Militia. He succeeded to his father's titles on the death of his father on 20 August 1794. Before the Act of Union, he was Chairman of Committees in the Irish House of Lords; as compensation from the abolition of the House in 1801, he was awarded an annual pension of £1332.

On 20 February 1810, he was sworn of the Privy Council of Ireland and was elected an Irish representative peer on 2 March 1816. On 11 May 1819, he represented the Duke of Clarence and St Andrews (later William IV) at the baptism of Prince George of Cambridge in Hanover and was appointed a GCH that year.

At the coronation of George IV on 19 July 1821, he carried the Standard of Hanover.

== Family ==
On 24 May 1792, Mayo had married Arabella Mackworth-Praed (1766–1843), daughter of William Mackworth Praed of Bitton House, Devon; they had no children. Arabella was Lady of the Bedchamber to Queen Adelaide. He died at Bersted Lodge, South Bersted, Sussex, the home of Susan Smith (née Mackworth-Praed) his sister in law and widow of Thomas Smith of Bersted Lodge (brother of Sir John Smith Burgess, Bart), and his titles passed to his nephew, Robert.

== Honours and Arms ==
=== Honours ===
Country	Date	Appointment	Ribbon	Post-nominals
United Kingdom	1810–1849	Privy Council of Ireland		PC (Ire)
United Kingdom	1819–1849	Knight Grand Cross of the Royal Guelphic Order		GCH

=== Arms ===
Coat of arms of John Bourke, 4th Earl of Mayo
Crest A Cat-a-Mountain sejant guardant proper, collared and chained Or. Escutcheon Party per fess Or and Ermine, a cross gules the first quarter charged with a lion rampant sable and the second with a dexter hand couped at the wrist and erect gules Supporters On either side a Chevalier in complete Armour, holding in the exterior hand a Pole-Axe, all proper. Motto A CRUCE SALUS (Salvation from the Cross) Orders Royal Guelphic Order

== Ancestry ==
Ancestors of John Bourke, 4th Earl of Mayo

8. Richard Bourke
4. John Bourke, 1st Earl of Mayo
9. Catherine Minchin
2. Joseph Bourke, 3rd Earl of Mayo
10. Joseph Deane
5. Mary Deane
11. Margaret Boyle
1. John Bourke, 4th Earl of Mayo
12. Sir John Meade, 1st Baronet
6. Sir Richard Meade, 3rd Baronet
13. Hon. Elizabeth Butler
3. Elizabeth Meade
14. Henry Prittie
7. Catherine Prittie
15. Elizabeth Harrison

== See also ==
- House of Burgh, an Anglo-Norman and Hiberno-Norman dynasty founded in 1193

Parliament of the United Kingdom
Preceded by The Earl of Wicklow	Representative peer for Ireland; 1816–1849	Succeeded by The Earl of Lanesborough
Parliament of Ireland
Preceded by John Bourke, Lord Naas; Sir Richard Gorges-Meredyth, 1st Bt	Member of Parliament for Naas; 1790–1794; With: John Bourke, Lord Naas 1790–1791; James Bond 1791–1794	Succeeded by Sir James Bond, 1st Bt; George Damer, Viscount Milton
Peerage of Ireland
Preceded by Joseph Bourke	Earl of Mayo; 1794–1849	Succeeded by Robert Bourke
