= Francis Burton (Ennis MP) =

Irish politician

Francis Burton was an Irish politician.

Burton was born in County Cork and educated at Eton and Trinity College, Dublin.

Burgh represented Ennis from 1692 until his death in 1714.
