= Richard Burgh =

Irish barrister and politician (1725–62)

Member of Parliament for Naas
- In office 1759–1762 Serving with John Bourke and Maurice Keating
- Preceded by: Thomas Burgh; John Bourke
- Succeeded by: John Bourke; Maurice Keating

Personal details
- Born: 1725
- Died: 1762 (aged 36–37)
- Parent(s): Thomas Burgh; Mary Smyth
- Relatives: Thomas Burgh (brother); Walter Hussey Burgh (nephew)
- Education: Trinity College, Dublin

Richard Burgh (English: /ˈbɜːr/; BER; 1725 – September 1762) was an Irish barrister and politician who was MP for Naas (1759–1762).

== Biography ==
Burgh was the son of the military engineer and architect Colonel Thomas Burgh MP and his wife, Mary Smyth. He was educated at Trinity College, Dublin. He trained in law and worked as a barrister of Drumkeen, County Limerick.

In 1759, he succeeded his older brother, Thomas, as Member of Parliament for Naas in the Irish House of Commons, sitting until 1762. He left much of his property to his sister Elizabeth's son, Walter Hussey, on condition of him adopting the additional surname of Burgh.

== See also ==
- House of Burgh, an Anglo-Norman and Hiberno-Norman dynasty founded in 1193

Parliament of Ireland
Preceded by Thomas Burgh; John Bourke	Member of Parliament for Naas; 1759–1762; With: John Bourke; Maurice Keating	Succeeded by John Bourke; Maurice Keating
