= Brydges Henniker =

British Army officer and politician

Lieutenant-General Sir Brydges Henniker Bt
- Born: 10 November 1767; Essex
- Died: 3 July 1816 (aged 48); Newton Hall, Great Dunmow
- Spouse: Mary Pressy (m. 1791)
- Military career
- Allegiance: United Kingdom
- Branch: British Army
- Service years: 1785–1816
- Rank: Lieutenant-general
- Unit: 9th Light Dragoons

Member of Parliament for Kildare Borough
- In office 1797–1800 Serving with James Fitzgerald

Lieutenant-General Sir Brydges Trecothic Henniker, 1st Baronet (10 November 1767 – 3 July 1816) was a politician and British Army officer.

== Biography ==
Henniker was the youngest son of John Henniker, 1st Baron Henniker and Anne Major, daughter of Sir John Major, 1st Baronet.

He sat in the Irish House of Commons as the Member of Parliament for Kildare Borough between 1797 and the constituency's disenfranchisement under the Acts of Union 1800. On 2 November 1813 he was created a baronet, of Newton Hall in the County of Essex in the Baronetage of the United Kingdom.

He gained the rank of lieutenant-general while serving in the British Army.

On 25 September 1791 he married Mary Pressy. Upon his death he was succeeded in his title by his eldest son, Sir Frederick Henniker, 2nd Baronet.

Parliament of Ireland
| Preceded by Jones Harrison; Robert Graydon | Member of Parliament for Kildare Borough; 1797–1800; With: James Fitzgerald | Succeeded by Constituency disenfranchised |
Baronetage of the United Kingdom
| New creation | Baronet (of Newton Hall); 1813–1816 | Succeeded by Frederick Henniker |
