= John Aylmer (politician) =

Irish politician (c.1652–1705)

John Aylmer (c. 1652 – 1705) was an Irish politician.

Aylmer represented Naas in the Irish House of Commons between 1692 and 1693.

Parliament of Ireland
Preceded by Patriot Parliament	Member of Parliament for Naas; 1692–1693; With: Nicholas Jones	Succeeded by Richard Nevill; James Barry
