= Francis Spring (Irish MP) =

Anglo-Irish politician

Francis Spring (circa 1660 – 1711) was an Anglo-Irish politician.

Spring was the great-grandson of Thomas Spring of Castlemaine. In 1699 he was a Commissioner for the collection of taxation in County Kildare. He represented Naas as a Member of Parliament in the Irish House of Commons between 1703 and his death in 1711. He served as High Sheriff of Kildare in 1709.

On 18 November 1703 he presented a petition to the Commons alongside other Kildare MPs to complain about the practices of John and Francis Annesley, Justices of the Peace in the county.

Parliament of Ireland
| Preceded by Richard Nevill; James Barry | Member of Parliament for Naas; 1703–1711; With: Alexander Gradon | Succeeded by Alexander Gradon; James Barry |
