= Chetwode (surname) =

Chetwode is a surname, and may refer to:

- Anna Maria Chetwode (fl. 1827), Irish novelist
- George Chetwode (1877–1957), Royal Navy officer
- Sir John Chetwode, 4th Baronet (1764–1845), British politician
- Penelope Chetwode (1910–1986), English travel writer and wife of John Betjeman
- Philip Chetwode, 1st Baron Chetwode (1869–1950), British Army officer

== See also ==
- Baron Chetwode
- Chetwood
