= Terence Bourke, 10th Earl of Mayo =

Royal Navy officer and peer (1929–2006)

The Right Honourable The Earl of Mayo
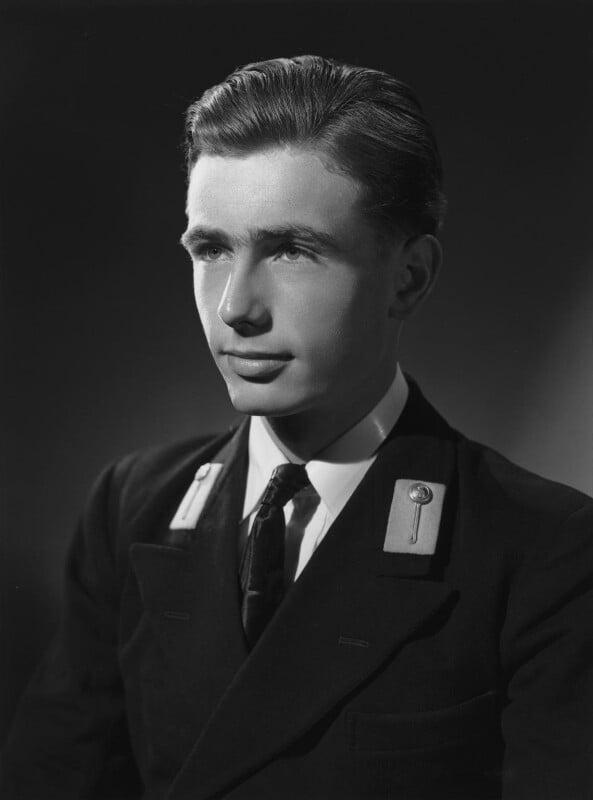
- Bourke in 1948
- Born: Terence Patrick Bourke; 26 August 1929; Gosforth, Northumbria
- Died: 22 September 2006 (aged 77); France
- Education: St. Aubyns Preparatory School, Rottingdean
- Alma mater: Dartmouth Royal Naval College
- Spouses: Margaret Jane Robinson Harrison (m. 1952; div. 1987); Sally Anne Matthews (m. 1987)
- Children: 4, including: Charles Bourke, 11th Earl of Mayo
- Parent: Hon. Bryan Longley Bourke
- Military career
- Allegiance: United Kingdom
- Branch: Royal Navy
- Service years: 1956–1959
- Units: Fleet Air Arm; No. 703 Naval Air Squadron
- Conflicts: Suez Crisis (1956)

Terence Patrick Bourke, 10th Earl of Mayo (English: /bɜːrk/; BURK; 26 August 1929 – 22 September 2006) spent much of his life in England, before moving to Ireland and finally France. He was a pilot in the Fleet Air Arm, ran a printing company, stood for parliament, managed a marble quarrying company in Ireland, and finally bred deer in south-west France.

== Early life ==
Bourke was born in Gosforth, Northumbria, the son of the Hon. Bryan Longley Bourke, third son of Walter Longley Bourke, 8th Earl of Mayo. He was educated at St. Aubyns Preparatory School in Rottingdean and then at the Dartmouth Royal Naval College, as a cadet. He was commissioned into the Royal Navy and joined the Fleet Air Arm, flying Sea Hawks in the Suez Crisis of 1956. He later flew aerobatics with No. 703 Naval Air Squadron and left the Navy on medical grounds in 1959.

== Career ==
Bourke set up a printing company in Gosport, Hampshire, where he became active in local politics, serving as a Conservative councillor from 1961 to 1964. In 1962 he inherited his titles from an uncle, Ulick Henry Bourke, 9th Earl of Mayo. He stood for Parliament as a Liberal candidate in South Dorset in the 1964 general election, but lost heavily to the Conservative candidate.

In 1965, he moved to County Galway in the Republic of Ireland, where he became managing director of the Irish Marble Company, quarrying Connemara marble. He also founded the Galway Flying Club, which later led to the creation of Galway airport.

== Marriages and children ==
In 1952, Bourke married firstly Margaret Jane Robinson Harrison. They had three sons:

- Charles Diarmuidh John Bourke, 11th Earl of Mayo (born 11 June 1953)
- Hon Patrick Anthony Bourke (born 16 December 1955)
- Hon Harry Richard Bourke (born 23 September 1960)

They were divorced in 1987. Later that year Lord Mayo married secondly Sally Anne Matthews. They had one son:

- Hon James Edward Maurice Bourke (born 1986)

With his second wife and their son, he moved to a chateau in the south-west of France, where he bred deer.

== Death ==
Lord Mayo died in 2006 and was buried at Mondebat in the French département of Gers. He was succeeded in the earldom and subsidiary titles by his eldest son, Charles.

== Arms ==
Coat of arms of Terence Bourke, 10th Earl of Mayo
Crest A Cat-a-Mountain sejant guardant proper, collared and chained Or. Escutcheon Party per fess Or and Ermine, a cross gules the first quarter charged with a lion rampant sable and the second with a dexter hand couped at the wrist and erect gules Supporters On either side a Chevalier in complete Armour, holding in the exterior hand a Pole-Axe, all proper. Motto A CRUCE SALUS (Salvation from the Cross)

== See also ==
- House of Burgh, an Anglo-Norman and Hiberno-Norman dynasty founded in 1193

Peerage of Ireland
Preceded by Ulick Bourke	Earl of Mayo; 1962–2006	Succeeded by Charles Bourke
