= Rupert Soames =

British businessman

The Honourable Rupert Soames OBE
- Born: Rupert Christopher Soames; 18 May 1959 (age 67); Croydon, Surrey, England
- Education: Eton College
- Alma mater: Worcester College, Oxford
- Occupation: Businessman
- Years active: 1982–present
- Spouse: Camilla Dunne (m. 1988)
- Children: 3
- Parent(s): Christopher Soames; Mary Churchill
- Relatives: Winston Churchill (grandfather); Nicholas Soames (brother)

Rupert Christopher Soames (born 18 May 1959) is a British businessman. He was chair of the Confederation of British Industry (CBI) from 2024 to 2025, and was the chief executive of Serco from 2014 to 2023. He is a grandson of Winston Churchill, a nephew of one-time Defence Secretary Duncan Sandys and his wife Diana Churchill, of journalist Randolph Churchill, and of actress and dancer Sarah Churchill.

== Early life and education ==
Soames was born in Croydon, to Christopher and Mary Soames. He is a grandson of Winston Churchill, a nephew of one-time Defence Secretary Duncan Sandys and his wife Diana Churchill, of journalist Randolph Churchill, and of actress and dancer Sarah Churchill, and is a great-nephew of the founders of the Scout movement, the 1st Baron Baden-Powell and his wife, the Baroness Baden-Powell.

Soames was educated at St Aubyns School in Rottingdean, East Sussex: in 2025 he revealed that he had been sexually abused by a master at the school. He continued to Eton College and then Worcester College, Oxford, where he studied Philosophy, Politics and Economics (PPE). While at Oxford he worked as a DJ at the London nightclub Annabel's and was a member of the Bullingdon Club, as well as being elected to the Presidency of the Oxford Union and featuring in the Sunday Times 1981 article on Oxford, where Soames described himself as getting "hog-whimperingly drunk".

== Career ==
Upon graduation, he was offered a position at GEC by the managing director Arnold Weinstock. He remained at GEC for 15 years, working in the company's avionics and computing divisions, and became managing director of Avery Berkel, running the company's UK, India, Asia and Africa operations.

After leaving GEC in 1997, Soames joined the financial software company Misys as chief executive of its Midas-Kapiti division. He was promoted to chief executive of the Banking and Securities Division in June 2000.

Soames left Misys after a disagreement with Misys founder Kevin Lomax on the company's direction, and was appointed chief executive of power hire group Aggreko in June 2003, replacing Philip Harrower, who died when his car collided with a train in the United States. Soames left Aggreko in 2014.

Soames was appointed Officer of the Order of the British Empire (OBE) in the 2010 New Year Honours.

In November 2010, he gave a speech at the Scottish Parliament in which he warned, "In the UK, we are already close to the rocks, because, over the next 8 years a third of our coal-fired capacity, two-thirds of our oil-fired capacity, and nearly three-quarters of our nuclear capacity will be closed down either through age or the impact of the European Large Combustion Plant Directive. Absent a massive and immediate programme of building new power stations, with concrete being poured in the next two years, we will be in serious danger of the lights going out."

In December 2023, it was announced that Soames had been appointed as the new President of the Confederation of British Industry (CBI), taking up the position in early 2024.

== Personal life ==
He married Camilla Dunne, daughter of Sir Thomas Dunne, KG, KCVO in 1988. They have three children: Arthur, Daisy, and Jack. Daisy Soames is a god-daughter of Diana, Princess of Wales, and works as a horse safari guide in Kenya. Jack Soames has served as a Page of Honour. His brother is former MP Nicholas Soames, Baron Soames of Fletching.

On 21 March 2025 Soames, spoken publicly for the first time about the sexual abuse he suffered at the St. Aubyn's boarding school in the 1960s. He was abused by two masters with an "unhealthy appetite for young boys", from the age of “eight or nine”. Soames confirmed the abuse was “confronted”, with one of the school masters going to prison.
