= John Bourke, 2nd Earl of Mayo =

Irish politician and peer c.1729–1792

The Right Honourable The Earl of Mayo

Member of the Irish House of Lords
- Hereditary Peerage; 1790 – 20 April 1792
- Preceded by: John Bourke
- Succeeded by: Joseph Deane Bourke

Member of Parliament for Naas
- Incumbent
- Assumed office 1763
- Preceded by: Richard Burgh; Maurice Keating
- Succeeded by: James Bond; John Bourke

Personal details
- Born: John Bourke c.1729
- Died: 20 April 1792 (aged 62–63)
- Spouse: Lady Mary Leeson (m. 1764–1792)
- Children: None
- Parents: John Bourke, 1st Earl of Mayo; Mary Deane
- Education: Trinity College, Dublin

John Bourke, 2nd Earl of Mayo (English: /bɜːrk/; BURK; circa 1729 – 20 April 1792), styled Lord Naas (/neɪs/; NAYSS) until 1790, was an Irish politician and peer who was MP for Naas (1763–90).

== Career ==
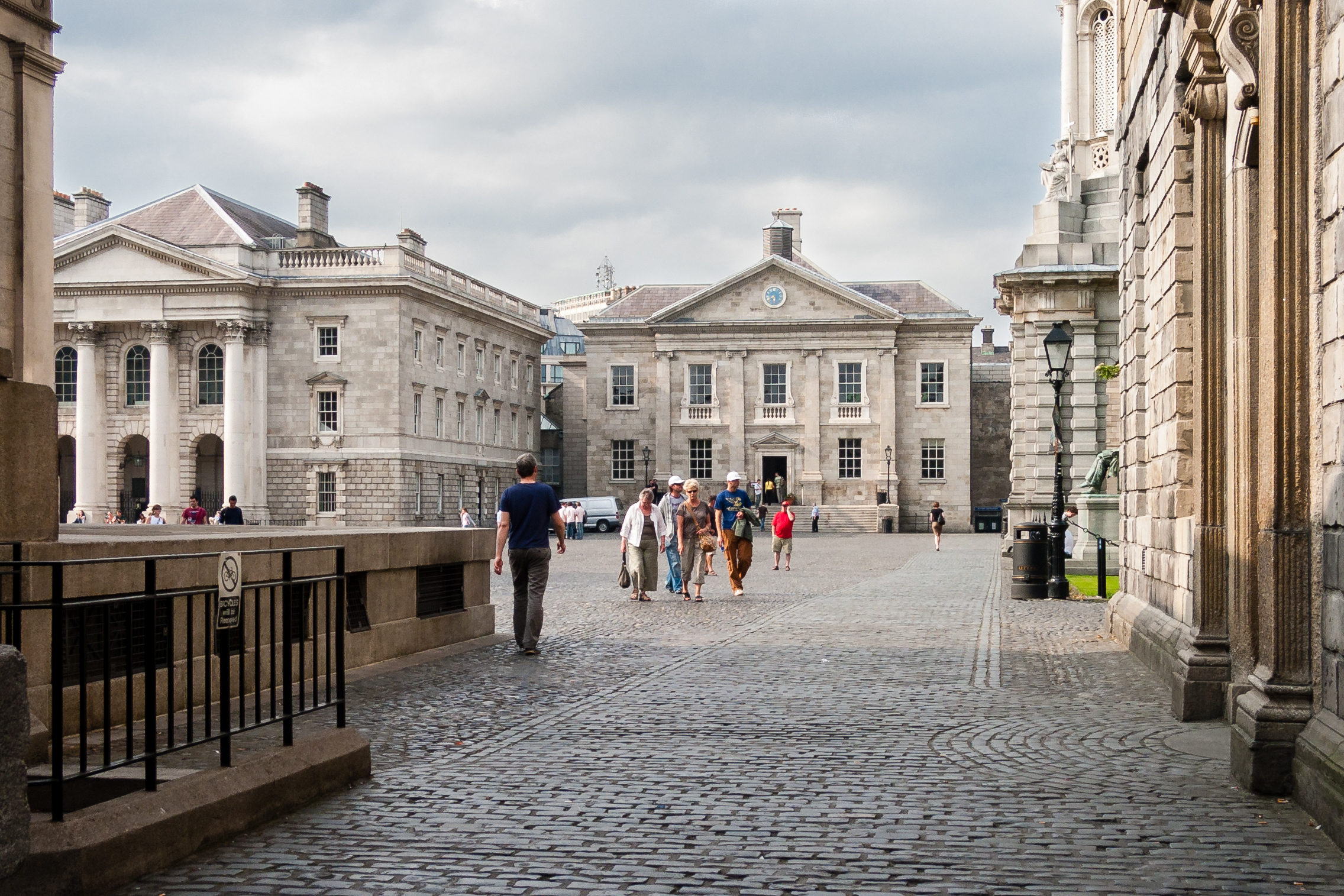
Trinity College, Dublin.

Bourke was the son of John Bourke, 1st Earl of Mayo and Mary Deane, daughter of Joseph Deane. He was educated at Trinity College, Dublin.

He sat in the Irish House of Commons as the Member of Parliament for Naas between 1763 and 1790. That year he inherited his father's titles and assumed his seat in the Irish House of Lords.

== Family ==
He married Lady Mary Leeson (1734–1809), daughter of Joseph Leeson, 1st Earl of Milltown and Cecilia Leigh, in February 1764. He died without issue.

== Arms ==
Coat of arms of John Bourke, 2nd Earl of Mayo
Crest A Cat-a-Mountain sejant guardant proper, collared and chained Or. Escutcheon Party per fess Or and Ermine, a cross gules the first quarter charged with a lion rampant sable and the second with a dexter hand couped at the wrist and erect gules Supporters On either side a Chevalier in complete Armour, holding in the exterior hand a Pole-Axe, all proper. Motto A CRUCE SALUS (Salvation from the Cross)

== Ancestry ==
Ancestors of John Bourke, 2nd Earl of Mayo

8. John Bourke
4. Richard Bourke
9. Catherine Fay
2. John Bourke, 1st Earl of Mayo
10. Charles Minchin
5. Catherine Minchin
11. Elizabeth Paulet
1. John Bourke, 2nd Earl of Mayo
12. Joseph Deane of Deanehill
6. Joseph Deane
13. Elizabeth Parker
3. Mary Deane
14. Colonel Henry Boyle
7. Margaret Boyle
15. Lady Mary O'Brien

== See also ==
- House of Burgh, an Anglo-Norman and Hiberno-Norman dynasty founded in 1193

Parliament of Ireland
Preceded by Richard Burgh; Maurice Keating	Member of Parliament for Naas; 1763–1790; With: Maurice Keating (1763–1768); John Bourke (1768–1777); Thomas Allan (1777–1783); Hugh Carleton (1783–1787); Sir Richard Gorges-Meredyth, Bt. (1787–1790); John Bourke (1790–1791)	Succeeded by James Bond; John Bourke
Peerage of Ireland
Preceded by John Bourke	Earl of Mayo; 1785–1790	Succeeded by Joseph Deane Bourke
