= Sir Hugh Crofton, 2nd Baronet =

Anglo-Irish politician (1763–1834)

Sir Hugh Crofton, 2nd Baronet (17 July 1763 – 6 January 1834) was an Anglo-Irish politician.

Crofton was the son of Sir Morgan Crofton, 1st Baronet and Jeanne d'Abzac. Between 1786 and 1790 he sat in the Irish House of Commons as the Member of Parliament for Tulsk. He married Frances Smyth, daughter of Ralph Smyth, in June 1787. On 12 February 1802, he succeeded to his father's baronetcy.

Parliament of Ireland
| Preceded by James Fitzgerald; William Caulfeild | Member of Parliament for Tulsk; 1786–1790; With: James Fitzgerald | Succeeded by James Fitzgerald; Henry Cope |
Baronetage of Ireland
| Preceded by Morgan Crofton | Baronet (of Mohill); 1802–1834 | Succeeded by Morgan George Crofton |
