= John Digby (Irish politician) =

Irish politician

John Digby (1691 – 27 July 1786) was an Irish politician.

Digby sat in the Irish House of Commons as the Member of Parliament for Kildare Borough between 1732 and 1760.

Parliament of Ireland
Preceded by Robert Dixon; Richard Warren	Member of Parliament for Kildare Borough; 1732–1760; With: Richard Warren (1732–1735); Robert Downes (1735–1755); Robert Harman (1755–1760)	Succeeded by Edward Sandford; Henry Sandford
