= St Aubyns School =

Coordinates: 50.80418°N 0.05738°W

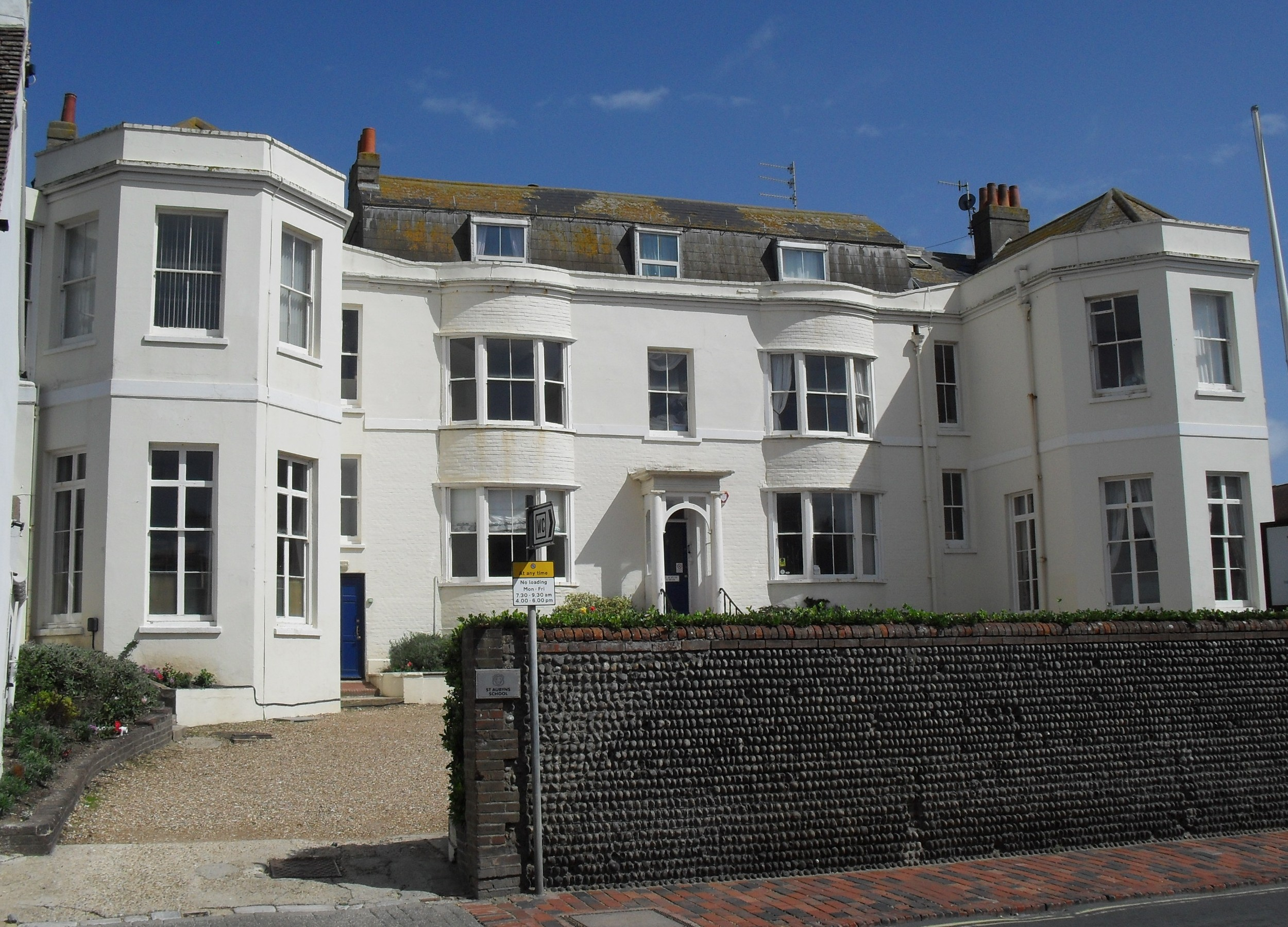

Location
- 76 High Street, Rottingdean; Brighton, East Sussex, BN2 7JN; England

Information
- Type: Preparatory day and boarding
- Established: 1895
- Founder: C. E. F. Stanford
- Closed: 2013
- Local authority: Brighton and Hove
- Department for Education URN: 114617 Tables
- Chairman of the Governors: John Wakeham, Baron Wakeham
- Headmaster: Simon Hitchings
- Staff: 25
- Gender: Co-educational
- Age: 3 to 13
- Enrolment: 189
- Publication: The Bugle
- Website: http://staubynsschoolbrighton.co.uk/

St. Aubyns School was a boys' preparatory school in Rottingdean, East Sussex, England, which in its final years became co-educational and taught children of both sexes between the ages of three and thirteen. The school was founded in 1895, taking over the premises of another school which had been founded in the 18th century by Thomas Hooker, the local vicar who was also reputedly a lookout for the local smugglers.

In the school's early decades it had an apostrophe in its name, but this was expunged by a new head master, Hampton Gervis, in the spring term of 1940.

The school was privately owned, usually by the head master, until 1969, after which it was owned and operated by an independent charitable trust. Within a year of that trust merging with the Cothill Educational Trust, the new owners closed the school, despite opposition from parents. Since the closure in 2013, multiple allegations of sexual abuse at the school have surfaced. In 2024 Sussex Police announced the arrest of one teacher from the 1990s as part of an ongoing investigation.

== History ==
St Aubyns was founded by Charles Stanford in 1895 as a boys' preparatory school for boarders. Stanford had been a housemaster of Kingsgate School in Winchester and moved to Rottingdean with his wife, his deputy Vaughan Lang, a maintenance man, and six pupils, to start a new school.

The premises which Stanford occupied had been a school for much of the 19th century. Thomas Hooker, vicar of Rottingdean from 1790s to the 1830s, was known as an educator of pupils who lodged with him at the vicarage. He then rented rooms in the former Rottingdean Manor House and employed an assistant schoolmaster to expand his school. After his death, a school continued and changed hands several times. From 1863 a Mr Hewitt ran Field House School on the site; there Ralph Vaughan Williams and the later Earl Jellicoe were educated. That school was bought in 1887 by two brothers called Mason, who gave their establishment the name Rottingdean School. In 1894 they moved this school to another site in the village, leaving empty buildings suitable for a school which were acquired by Stanford in 1895, to create St Aubyn's.

The school remained in essence unchanged for its first one hundred years, with numbers between 60 and 100 pupils for most of that time. A chapel was built in 1912 and dedicated the following year. This records the names of 102 old boys who died in the First and Second World Wars.

The school was privately owned by Stanford, who sold it on to Lang, who succeeded him as head master in 1919. Lang in turn sold an interest in the school to his successor, Hampton Gervis, in 1940; one of the other masters, Eric Webber, also had a financial share in the business. The school became a limited company and a charitable trust in 1969.

Sir Wilfred Thesiger, who attended the school from 1919 to 1923, later recalled his treatment by Lang: "The headmaster was a sadist. He had certain victims, my brother and myself among them, and on the slightest excuse, such as making a noise in the passage or not putting our shoes away properly, he beat us with a whip with a red lash. I carried the marks for years."

In 1940, during the Second World War, the school was evacuated to North Wales, renting a large country house called Voelas, near Pentrefoelas, from a family called Wynne Finch. Here school life continued little changed, including sporting fixtures against other prep schools evacuated to the area, and the Voelas Cup was inaugurated, to be awarded each year to the pupil who had gained the most section marks.

In 1995 a pre-prep department was opened, and with this came an increase in the proportion of day pupils. Girls were first admitted to the school in 1996, although the first girl was Molly Stanford, daughter of Charles Stanford, in the early 20th century. In 2002 a nursery was opened. Full boarding ended in 2003, although weekly and flexible boarding continued until the school was closed.

In 2015 Richard Rowland, a former head of history at the school, authored A History of St Aubyns 1895–2013.

== Controversy over closure ==
In May 2012 the school trust which had been established in 1969 merged with the larger Cothill Educational Trust, which operates a number of other English prep schools, including Cothill House and Chandlings School, Kennington, both near Oxford, Ashdown House, Sussex, Barfield, Kitebrook House, and Mowden Hall School, Northumberland, and which also owns the Château de Sauveterre in France, where older prep school children go to learn French language and culture intensively. However, within a year of that merger Cothill decided to close the school. Despite strenuous efforts by the parents of the children to keep it open, and an offer made by Hurstpierpoint College to acquire it and use it as a junior department, the school finally closed on 7 July 2013.

The Cothill Trust's acquisition of the school and its campus, and its subsequent decision to close the school, were the subject of a formal complaint to the Charity Commissioners. By chance, they were chaired by an old boy of the school, William Shawcross.

Cothill blamed the end of the school on debt and falling pupil numbers, and Adrian Richardson, principal of Cothill, commented: "It is very sad. However, a charity, like any other business, cannot run a loss-making enterprise indefinitely." The parents had by then raised more than £2 million to acquire the school, and they accused Cothill of killing off the offer by Hurstpierpoint College to take it over by demanding not only the £1 million they had paid in 2012 to settle the school's debts but also twice the amount they had paid to buy the school's assets. They suggested Cothill was asset-stripping and what it wanted was to sell the school site, valued at £25 million, to the highest bidder, not for use as a school but for development.

== School name ==
Charles Stanford founded the school as St Aubyn's, although his reason for choosing that name is not known. The apostrophe was used in the name until 1940, but was dropped after the Spring Term of 1940, as can be seen in the school magazines for the Spring and Summer Terms of that year. The change coincided with the arrival of a new headmaster, Hampton Gervis, and also with the school's evacuation from Rottingdean soon after the end of the so-called Phoney War, at the time of the Battle of Britain over southern England. The spelling "St Aubyns" has been used consistently by the school ever since. Gervis said nothing in the school magazine about his reasons for dropping the apostrophe, but it is possible that he wished to avoid confusion with St Aubyn's School in Essex.

== Headmasters ==
- 1895–1919: Charles Edward Fitzgerald Stanford
- 1919–1940: Robert Charles Vaughan Lang
- 1940–1974: William Hampton Gervis
- 1974–1998: Julian Alexander Ludovic James
- 1998–2007: Adrian G. Gobat
- 2007–2013: Simon L. Hitchings

== Notable former pupils ==
- Martin Beale, statistician
- Percy Bernard, 5th Earl of Bandon, Air Chief Marshal
- Robert Boothby, Baron Boothby, Conservative Party politician
- Terence Bourke, 10th Earl of Mayo, businessman, politician and farmer
- Sir Guy Campbell, 5th Baronet, soldier
- David Carnegie, 11th Earl of Northesk, winter Olympian and representative peer
- Noah Cato, rugby player
- Matthew Fleming, England and Kent cricketer
- Cyril Hare, judge and crimewriter
- John Kipling, son of Rudyard Kipling
- Andrew Lindsay, Olympic gold medallist (2000), rowing
- Ronald Littledale, British Army officer who became a Prisoner of War and successfully escaped from Colditz Castle during the Second World War
- Conrad O'Brien-ffrench, Secret Intelligence Officer
- Harry Percy
- Ralph Percy
- Myles Ponsonby, intelligence officer, diplomat, British Ambassador to Mongolia
- William Shawcross, writer
- Nicholas Soames, Baron Soames of Fletching, Conservative Party politician
- Rupert Soames, businessman and CEO of Serco plc
- Hugo Swire, Conservative Party politician
- Sir Wilfred Thesiger, explorer
- Adam Virgo, football player
- Stuart Wheeler, businessman and political activist
- Sir George Young, Conservative Party politician

== Inspection ==
The Independent Schools Inspectorate highlighted a "stimulating and tolerant atmosphere", "outstanding" pastoral care, and the focus on personalised learning as "an area of outstanding practice". "Achievement in drama, art and sport ... is outstanding for a school of its size", the report stated. The behaviour of the children and the excellent relationship between pupils and staff were also singled out for praise. The Nursery Inspection (Ofsted 2008) emphasised the outstanding nature of the provision at that level. The boarding provision was judged to be outstanding in the Boarding Inspection (Ofsted 2009). A press article described the school as having "the intoxicating combination of small classes and a big heart".

== Sexual Abuse Scandals ==
An investigative documentary by the journalist Alex Renton was broadcast by ITV on 19 February 2018. This mentions St Aubyns School in the light of allegations of sexual abuse by several teachers in the 1970s and 1980s, and the subsequent suicide of one alleged victim.

On 21 March 2025, an article appeared in The Times which quoted Rupert Soames, Chairman of the Confederation of British Industry, about the sexual abuse he had suffered at St Aubyns in the late 1960s. Soames said he was abused from the age of "eight or nine" by two masters with an "unhealthy appetite for young boys", that the abuse had been “confronted”, and that one of the schoolmasters had gone to prison.

== See also ==
- Grade II listed buildings in Brighton and Hove: S
