= The Monks of the Screw =

The Monks of the Screw was the name of an Irish drinking club active in the period 1779–1789. It was also called the Order of St. Patrick. The "screw" referred to the corkscrew required to open a bottle of wine.

== Ethos and foundation ==
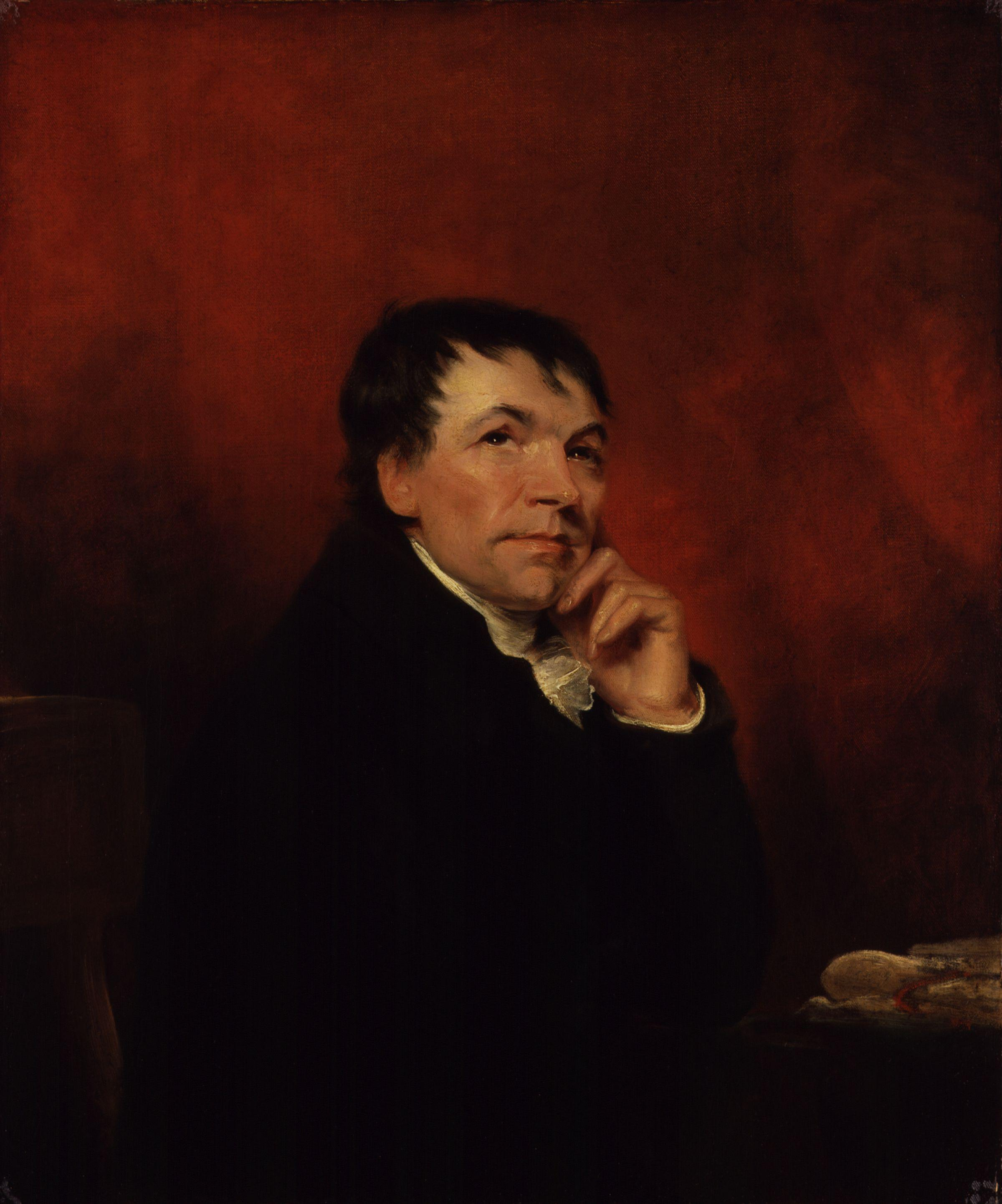
John Philpot Curran

According to the club's song, it was founded sometime in the 5th century by Ireland's patron saint: "When Saint Patrick this order established / He called us the Monks of the Screw". The real founder was John Philpot Curran, a convivial and popular wit and a lawyer at the Irish Bar. The members were liberal by contemporary standards, and some assisted in the first reforms of the penal laws. Most were lawyers or politicians in the Parliament of Ireland; Curran being both. Most supported the Irish Patriot Party.

== Uniform and meeting places ==
The members had to wear a black poplin gown and generally met in Kevin Street, Dublin, or at Curran's house "The Priory", near Rathfarnham. Curran was jokingly described as the Prior of the Order.

== Members ==
The membership included:

- Lord Mornington
- George Townshend, 1st Marquess Townshend
- John Philpot Curran
- Barry Yelverton, 1st Viscount Avonmore
- Father Arthur O'Leary
- George Ogle
- Henry Grattan
- Walter Hussey Burgh
- Dudley Hussey
- Henry Flood
- Arthur Wolfe
- Arthur Gore, 2nd Earl of Arran
- Jonah Barrington
- William Tankerville Chamberlain
- Dudley Hussey
- Matthias Finucane
- Henry Duquerry
- James Dennis, 1st Baron Tracton.

== Modern band ==
An eponymous Irish traditional music band comes from Sliabh Luachra in County Cork.
