= Sir James Bond, 1st Baronet =

Irish Member of Parliament

Sir James Bond, 1st Baronet (11 June 1744 – 2 June 1820) was an Irish Member of Parliament of Anglo-Irish descent.

He was the son of the Rev. James Bond (died 1762), a minister at Corboy in County Longford by his wife Catherine, daughter of the Rev. Thomas Wensley, of Lifford, County Donegal. On 27 July 1770 he was married to Anne Hornby, the daughter of William Hornby, who would later serve as Governor of Bombay; they had several children and died on 3 July 1809. Bond sat in the Irish House of Commons as Member for Naas from 1790 to 1797, and on 21 January 1794, he was created a baronet, of Coolamber in County Longford, in the Baronetage of Ireland. At his death the baronetcy was inherited by his second son, Thomas, as his eldest, James Hornby Bond, had died in 1792.

Parliament of Ireland
Preceded by Lord Naas; John Bourke	Member of Parliament for Naas; 1791–1797; With: Lord Naas 1791–1794; Viscount Milton 1795–1797	Succeeded by Hon. Francis Hely-Hutchinson; Hon. Thomas Pelham
Baronetage of Ireland
New creation	Baronet (of Coolamber); 1794–1820	Succeeded by Thomas Bond
