= James Barry (Kildare MP) =

Irish politician, died 1725

James Barry (15 January 1661 – 16 April 1725) was an Irish politician.

Barry was a Member of Parliament (MP) in the Irish House of Commons and represented Naas from 1695 to 1699 and from 1711 to 1713. He sat then for Kildare Borough from 1715 to 1725.

Parliament of Ireland
Preceded by John Aylmer; Nicholas Jones	Member of Parliament for Naas; 1695–1703; With: Richard Nevill	Succeeded by Alexander Gradon; Francis Spring
Preceded by Alexander Gradon; Francis Spring	Member of Parliament for Naas; 1711–1713; With: Alexander Gradon	Succeeded by Thomas Burgh; Theobald Bourke
Preceded by Thomas Jones; Richard Locke	Member of Parliament for Kildare Borough; 1715–1725; With: Maurice Keating 1715–1716; Richard Warren 1716–1725	Succeeded by Maurice Keating; Richard Warren
