= Macartney baronets =

Baronetcy in the Baronetage of Ireland

- Escutcheon of the Macartney baronets of Lish
- Creation date: 1799
- Status: dormant
- Motto: Stimulat sed ornat, It stimulates, but it adorns

The Macartney Baronetcy, of Lish in the County of Armagh, is a title in the Baronetage of Ireland. It was created on 4 January 1799 for Sir John Macartney, Member of the Irish House of Commons for Fore and Naas. He had been knighted in 1796 for promoting inland navigation in Ireland. Macartney was the younger son of William Macartney, who represented Belfast in the Irish Parliament. The family have lived in Australia since the emigration of the third Baronet in the 19th century.

== Macartney baronets, of Lish (1799) ==
- Sir John Macartney, 1st Baronet (died 1812)
- Sir William Isaac Macartney, 2nd Baronet (1780–1867)
- Sir John Macartney, 3rd Baronet (1832–1911)
- Sir William Isaac Macartney, 4th Baronet (1867–1942)
- Sir Alexander Miller Macartney, 5th Baronet (1869–1960)
- Sir John Barrington Macartney, 6th Baronet (1917–1999)
- Sir John Ralph Macartney, 7th Baronet (born 1945), name not on the Official Roll.
