= William Macartney (1714–1793) =

Irish politician

William Macartney was an Irish politician.

== Biography ==
He was born in 1714, the younger son of Isaac Macartney, High Sheriff of Antrim in 1690, and his wife Anne, sister and co-heiress of John Haltridge of Dromore. His elder brother George also served as High Sheriff of Antrim, and his sister Grace married Sir Robert Blackwood, 1st Baronet. Lieutenant-General George Macartney was his uncle.

Macartney sat in the Irish House of Commons for Belfast from 1747 to 1760. He married Catherine, daughter of Thomas Bankes, of the family of Bankes of Corfe Castle, and was the father of Arthur Chichester Macartney of Murlough, his heir, and of Sir John Macartney, 1st Baronet, of Lish. He died on 27 June 1793.
