= Chetwood Creek =

Stream in California, United States

Coordinates: 37°35′51″N 119°14′11″W

Chetwood Creek is a stream in Madera County, California, in the United States.

Chetwood Creek was named for a local cowman.

== See also ==
- List of rivers of California
