= Sir John Macartney, 1st Baronet =

Irish politician, died 1812

- Died: 29 May 1812
- Occupation: Member of Parliament

Sir John Macartney, 1st Baronet (died 29 May 1812) was an Irish Member of Parliament.

== Biography ==
He was the second son of William Macartney, a long-serving Member of Parliament for Belfast, by his wife Catherine, daughter of Thomas Bankes.

He married firstly (by licence of the prerogative court of Ireland dated 26 February 1778) Anne, daughter of Edward Scriven by his wife Elizabeth, daughter of John Barclay of Dublin. They had seven children. Macartney married secondly on 4 November (by licence dated 3 November) 1794, Catherine, daughter of Walter Hussey Burgh, late Chief Baron of the Exchequer of Ireland, by his wife Anne, daughter of Thomas Burgh of Bert, County Kildare. By her, he had further issue, including Hussey Burgh Macartney, the first. Dean of Melbourne.

Macartney sat in the Irish House of Commons for Fore from 1793 to 1797, and for Naas from 1798 to 1800. He also served as Deputy Chief Remembrancer of the Exchequer of Ireland. On 29 April 1796, at the opening of the Grand Canal Docks, he was knighted "in consequence of his energetic exertions in the promotion of the inland navigation of Ireland", and on 4 January 1799 (the privy seal being dated 25 June 1799), he was created a baronet, of Lish, County Armagh.

On Macartney's death, he was succeeded in the title by his first son by his first wife, William Isaac Macartney (25 October 1780 – 31 July 1867). Macartney's widow died on 17 September 1840, in her seventieth year.

== Arms ==
Coat of arms of Sir John Macartney, 1st Baronet
Crest A hand holding a slip of a rose tree with three roses thereon all proper. Escutcheon Or, a stag trippant gules attired argent a border of the second. Motto Mens conscia recti.

Baronetage of Ireland
New creation	Baronet (of Lish); 1799–1812	Succeeded by William Macartney
