= Robert Downes (politician) =

Irish politician (1708–1754)

Robert Downes (1708 – 24 June 1754) was an Irish politician, who is chiefly remembered as father of William Downes, Lord Chief Justice of Ireland and the 1st Baron Downes.

He was the only son of Dive Downes, Bishop of Cork and Ross, and his fourth wife Catherine Fitzgerald, daughter of Honorable Robert FitzGerald and his wife Mary Clotworthy, and sister of Robert FitzGerald, 19th Earl of Kildare. His father had come to Ireland from Thornby, Northamptonshire in the 1670s.

Robert married Elizabeth Twigge, daughter of Thomas Twigge of Donnybrook, and had two sons, Dive (died 1798), a clergyman, and William Downes, 1st Baron Downes (1751-1826), Lord Chief Justice of Ireland, as well as at least two daughters.

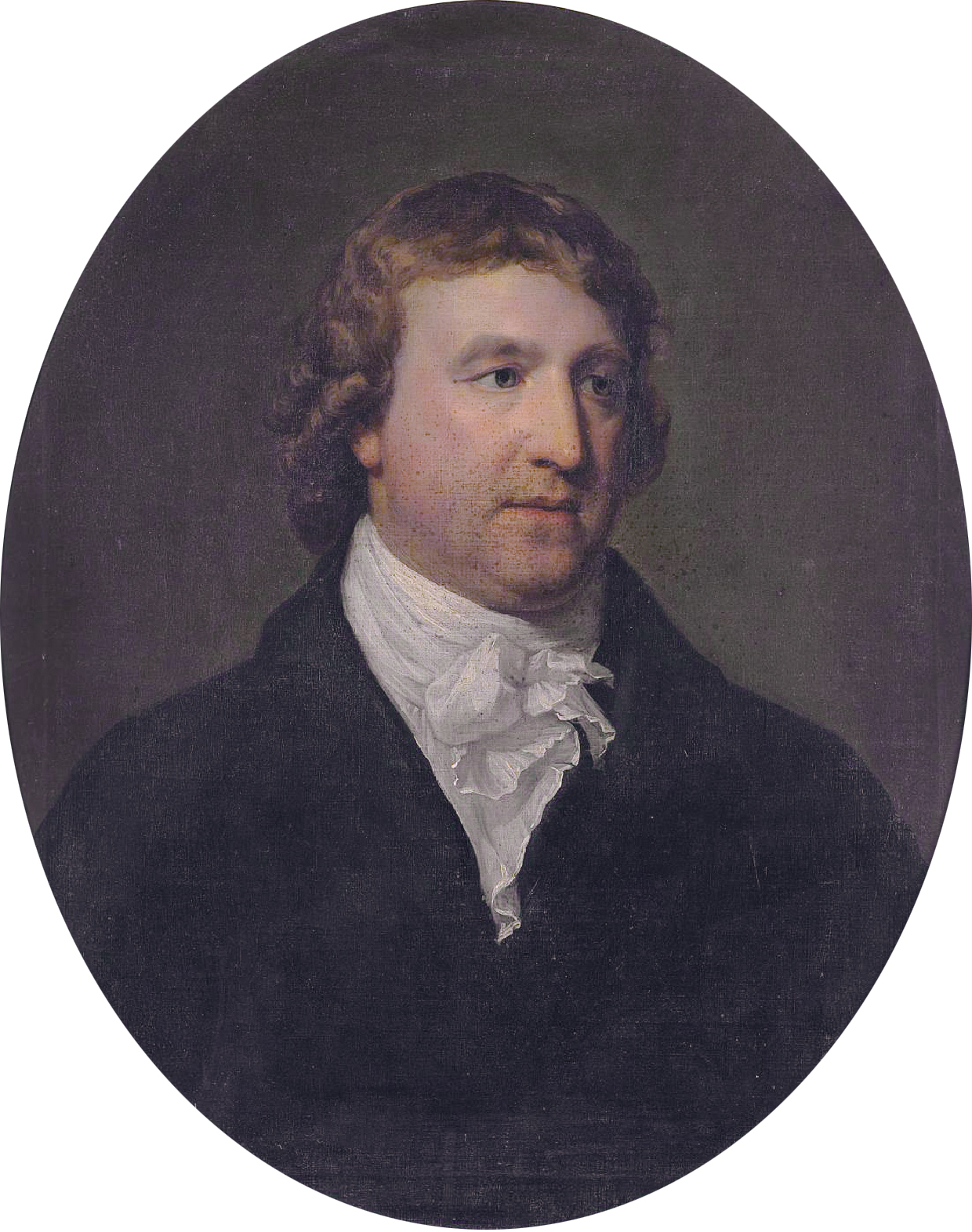
Robert's younger son William, 1st Baron Downes

Downes sat in the Irish House of Commons as the Member of Parliament for Kildare Borough from 1735 to his death in 1754.

He lived at Donnybrook Castle, County Dublin. His death was agreed to be accidental, due to running himself through with his own sword.

Parliament of Ireland
Preceded by John Digby; Richard Warren	Member of Parliament for Kildare Borough; 1735–1754; With: John Digby	Succeeded by John Digby; Robert Harman
