= Kildare Borough (Parliament of Ireland constituency) =

Pre-1801 constituency for the Irish House of Commons

Kildare
- Former borough constituency for the Irish House of Commons
- County: County Kildare
- Borough: Kildare

–1801
- Seats: 2
- Replaced by: Disfranchised

Kildare was a constituency represented in the Irish House of Commons until its abolition in 1801.

== History ==
In the Patriot Parliament of 1689 summoned by James II, Kildare Borough was represented with two members.

== Members of Parliament ==
- 1560 John Abells and John Moore
- 1585 John Wesley and William Shirgold
- 1613–1615 Thomas Farbeck and Walter Fitzgerald
- 1634–1635 Christopher Wandesford and Philip Pilsworth
- 1639–1642 Christopher Wandesford (replaced by Nicholas Whyte) and Sir George Wentworth (died and replaced 1641 by Patrick Sarsfield) (Whyte and Sarsfield expelled 1642)
- 1642–1649 Alexander Borrowes (died and replaced 1643 by Robert Kennedy)
- 1661–1666 Francis Peasley (sat for Newcastle – replaced by Sir Thomas Harman) and John Pecke

=== 1689–1801 ===
Election	First MP		Second MP	
1689	Francis Leigh		Robert Porter	
1692	Thomas Medlycott		Francis Robartes	
August 1695	Thomas Medlycott		William Palmer (Note: Also elected for Castlebar in 1695, for which he chose to sit)	
1695	Thomas Medlycott		John Davys	
1703	Thomas Jones		Richard Locke	
1715	James Barry		Maurice Keating (Note: Declared not duly elected in 1715)	
1716	James Barry		Richard Warren	
1725	Maurice Keating		Richard Warren	
1727	Robert Dixon		Richard Warren	
1732	John Digby		Richard Warren	
1735	John Digby		Robert Downes	
1755	John Digby		Robert Harman	
May 1761	Edward Sandford (Note: Also elected for Harristown in 1761, for which he chose to sit)		Henry Sandford	
1761	Garret FitzGerald		Henry Sandford	
1768	Marquess of Kildare (Note: Also elected for Dublin City in 1768, for which he chose to sit)	Patriot	Maurice Keating	
1769	Simon Digby		Joseph Henry	
1776	Simon Digby		Sir FitzGerald Aylmer, 6th Bt	
1783	Simon Digby		Lord Henry FitzGerald	Patriot
1790	Simon Digby		Robert Graydon	
1796	Jones Harrison		Robert Graydon	
1798	James FitzGerald	Patriot	Brydges Trecothic Henniker	
1801	Disenfranchised			

== Bibliography ==
- O'Hart, John (2007). The Irish and Anglo-Irish Landed Gentry: When Cromwell came to Ireland. Vol. II. Heritage Books. ISBN 978-0-7884-1927-0.
- Leigh Rayment's historical List of Members of the Irish House of Commons. Cites: Johnston-Liik, Edith Mary (2002). The History of the Irish Parliament 1692-1800 (6 volumes). Ulster Historical Foundation.
