= Toby Caulfeild (1750–1772) =

Irish politician

Toby Caulfeild (1750–1772) was an Irish politician.

Caulfeild was educated at Trinity College, Dublin. He represented Tulsk from 1771 to 1772.
