= Knightly Chetwood =

18th-century Anglican priest, poet, and translator

Knightly Chetwood (also Knightley Chetwood; 1650 in Chetwode – 1720 in Tempsford) was an Anglican priest, poet, and translator.

== Life ==
Chetwood was the eldest son of Valentine Chetwood of Chetwood, Buckinghamshire and his wife Mary Shute, daughter of Francis Shute of Upton, Leicestershire. His younger brother Benjamin Chetwood moved to Ireland, where he sat in the Irish House of Commons, and made an advantageous marriage to one of the co-heiresses of the Eustace family of Harristown, Naas South.

He was baptised on 29 October 1650. He was educated at Eton and King's College, Cambridge. He was ordained a priest in London on 4 March 1683.

He held the living at Great Rissington. He became Archdeacon of York on 10 January 1689.

He was the Dean of Gloucester from 1707 until his death on 4 April 1720.

== Works ==
Chetwood's works are:

- A Life of Wentworth Dillon, earl of Roscommon, in Baker MS. xxxvi. 27–44, on Wentworth Dillon, 4th Earl of Roscommon. It was summarised in a paper by Thompson Cooper in the Gentleman's Magazine for December 1855.
- Life of Lycurgus, in the translation of Plutarch's Lives of 1683.
- A Character, by a Person of Honour here in England, prefixed to Saint Evremont's Miscellaneous Essays, translated out of French and continued by Mr. Dryden, 1692.
- Life of Virgil and the Preface to the Pastorals in Dryden's translation of Virgil's Works, 1697.
- Translation of the Second Philippic in Several Orations of Demosthenes, English'd from the Greek by several Hands, 1702.
- Three single sermons; also a "Speech in the Lower House of Convocation on Friday, 20 May 1715. Against the late Riots", Lond. 1715.
- English poems, some of which are printed in Dryden's Miscellany and in Nichols's Select Collection of Poems; also English and Latin verses on the death of the Duchess of Newcastle (1676), in the Cambridge University collection on the marriage of the Prince of Orange (1677), and before Lord Roscommon's Essay on Translated Verse, 1685.

He also edited the Traitté touchant l'Obeissance Passive, Lond. (1685), translated by the Earl of Roscommon from the English of William Sherlock.

== Family ==
Chetwood married a daughter of Samuel Shute, sheriff of London, and left a son and a daughter, both of whom died unmarried. The son, Dr. John Chetwood, fellow of Trinity Hall, Cambridge, died on 17 February 1752. His will dated 25 Sept. 1733, gave to Wadham Knatchbull, a fellow of the college, a legacy, a locket of Lord Roscommon's hair, and his books, with his late father's manuscript sermons, requesting that Knatchbull, by his will, would order them to be destroyed. Chetwood had a claim, vainly prosecuted by his son, to the ancient English barony of Wahull.

Church of England titles
Preceded by William Jane	Dean of Gloucester; 1707–1720	Succeeded by John Waugh
