= James Dennis, 1st Baron Tracton =

Irish politician and judge

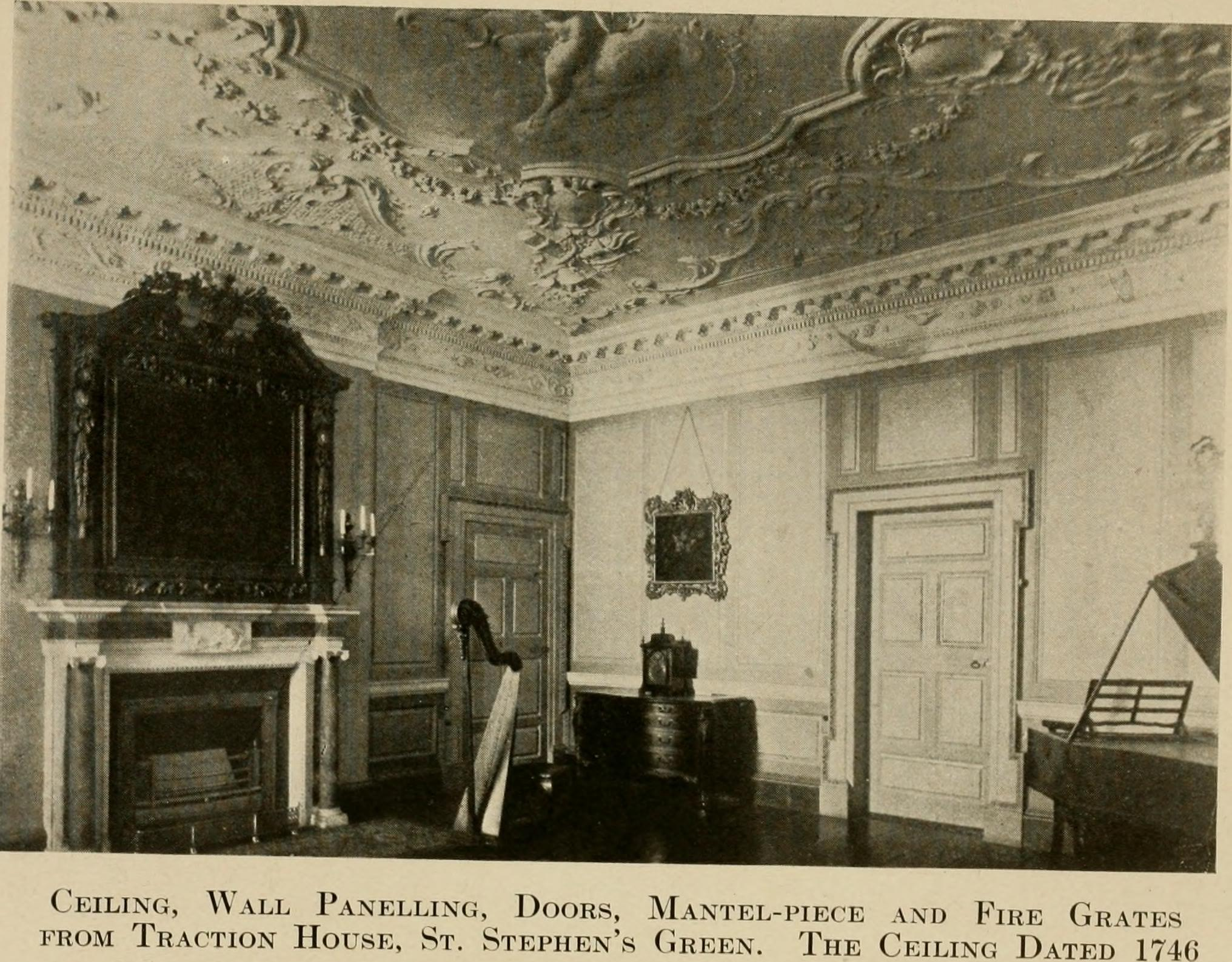
James Dennis home at 40 St. Stephen's Green, referred to as Tracton House.

James Dennis, 1st Baron Tracton PC (1721–15 June 1782) was an Irish politician and judge.

== Background ==
Dennis was the son of John Dennis, a timber merchant of Kinsale, County Cork, and Anne Bullen, daughter of William Bullen (d.1735), of Southwater and Bullen's Cove; Burgess of Kinsale.

== Political and judicial career ==
Dennis was educated at Trinity College, Dublin and became a barrister. He was the legal advisor to Henry Boyle, 1st Earl of Shannon, who also became a close personal friend. He later sat as a member of the Irish House of Commons for Rathcormack between 1761 and 1768 and for Youghal between 1768 and 1777: his speeches in the House are said to have displayed his profound learning. He also served as Serjeant-at-law (Ireland) and as Lord Chief Baron of the Exchequer in Ireland. He was sworn of the Irish Privy Council in 1777 and, at Lord Shannon's urging, was raised to the Peerage of Ireland as Baron Tracton, of Tracton Abbey in the County of Cork, on 4 January 1781. He was a founding member of the popular drinking club, The Monks of the Screw.

Elrington Ball praised him as a man of great learning, perhaps the most intellectually gifted Irish judge of his time, and a man who was almost universally liked.

== Personal life ==
In 1769, Dennis married Elizabeth Pigott, daughter of Emanuel Pigott of Chetwynd House, County Cork, but he died childless in June 1782. The barony died with him, but he left his estates to his two nephews, who in accordance with his will changed their surname to 'Dennis' and paid an annual jointure of £1,800 to their uncle's widow.

He lived for a time at 40 St. Stephen's Green which he purchased from Arthur Jones-Nevill in 1765. The house was later referred to as Tracton House until its demolition in 1912. The preserved Apollo Room from the house is now a museum piece in Dublin Castle.

His nephews were the two sons of Thomas Swift (1711–1803), of Lynn, County Westmeath, who had married his only sister, Frances. Thomas Swift was the son of Meade Swift (b.1692) J.P., of Lynn, a first cousin of the famous Jonathan Swift and Sir Richard Meade (1697–1744) 3rd Bt., father of the 1st Earl of Clanwilliam. Lord Tracton left his estates in County Kerry to his first nephew, the Rev. Meade Swift-Dennis (1753–1837), who married Delia, granddaughter of Morley Saunders, of Saunders Grove, County Wicklow, and Martha, daughter of John Stratford, 1st Earl of Aldborough. Baron Tracton left his estates of Tracton Abbey, County Cork and Temple Hill House, County Dublin to his second nephew, John Swift-Dennis (d.1830), M.P. for Kinsale, County Cork.

Peerage of Ireland
New creation	Baron Tracton; 1781–1782	Extinct
