= Robert Downs =

Robert Downs may refer to:

- Robert B. Downs (1903–1991), American librarian and author
- Bob Downs (born 1955), British cyclist

== See also ==
- Bob Downes (born 1937), English avant-garde jazz flautist and saxophonist
