= Maurice Keating (1690–1769) =

Irish politician

Maurice Keating (February 1690 – 17 November 1769) was an Irish politician.

Keating first stood for Kildare Borough in 1715, but was declared "not duly elected" and the seat was taken by Richard Warren.

He represented Kildare Borough in the Irish House of Commons between 1725 and 1727. He was then elected to sit for County Kildare from 1727 to 1760. From 1761 to 1768 he represented Naas, before again sitting in the Commons for Kildare Borough from 1768 until his death a year later.

Parliament of Ireland
Preceded by James Barry; Richard Warren	Member of Parliament for Kildare Borough; 1725–1727; With: Richard Warren	Succeeded by Robert Dixon; Richard Warren
Preceded by Joshua Allen; Francis Allen	Member of Parliament for County Kildare; 1727–1760; With: Richard Allen (1727–1745); Sir Kildare Borrowes, Bt. (1745–1760)	Succeeded by Sir Kildare Borrowes, Bt. Arthur Pomeroy
Preceded by Richard Burgh; John Bourke	Member of Parliament for Naas; 1761–1768; With: Richard Burgh (1761–1762); John Bourke (1763–1768)	Succeeded by John Bourke; John Bourke
Preceded by Garret FitzGerald; Henry Sandford	Member of Parliament for Kildare Borough; 1768–1769; With: Marquess of Kildare	Succeeded by Simon Digby; Joseph Henry
