= Benjamin Chetwood =

Irish politician

Benjamin Chetwood (1655–1728) was an Irish politician of English birth.

== Biography ==
Chetwood sat in the Irish House of Commons as the Member of Parliament for Harristown between 1713 and 1714.

He was the fourth son of Valentine Chetwood of Chetwood, Buckinghamshire and Mary Shute, daughter of Francis Shute of Upton, Leicestershire. Knightly Chetwood, Dean of Gloucester, was his elder brother. Precisely when he came to Ireland is unclear. He married Anne Eustace, daughter of Sir Maurice Eustace (died 1703) of Harristown, County Kildare and Eustace Street, Dublin and his first wife Anne Colville, by whom he had at least seven children, including Chetwood, the eldest son and heir. She died in 1713.

He inherited Harristown, and large properties in Dublin city, from his father-in-law. As trustee of the estate he was obliged to sell off much of the property, as the estate was encumbered by heavy debts. Chetwood himself was said to have made a handsome profit out of management of the estate. He had the reputation for being a shrewd and grasping businessman, and two petitions were presented to the Irish House of Commons complaining about his mismanagement of the Eustace estate. In 1715 the Provost of Trinity College Dublin complained that Chetwood had refused absolutely to repay debts owing to the college, citing a number of technical legal grounds. In 1719 his late wife's widowed stepmother and her half-sister, both named Clothilde Eustace, petitioned the Commons complaining that he had refused to pay one her widow's jointure and the other her marriage portion. The second petition at least was successful.

Parliament of Ireland
Preceded by Richard FitzPatrick; Robert Dixon	Member of Parliament for Harristown; 1713–1714; With: Alexander Gradon	Succeeded by Robert Johnson; Alexander Gradon
