= William Scott (Irish lawyer) =

Irish lawyer and judge

William Scott (1705 – 17 April 1776) was an Irish lawyer and judge.

== Background ==
He was the only son of Rev. Gideon Scott and Jane McNeill. His father, an Oxford man, came to Ireland as an army chaplain with William III of England, and settled in Ulster. He was given the estate of Willsborough, County Londonderry in 1696 by King William, who had been greatly impressed by a sermon he preached, and named the estate after the King. William's mother was the daughter of John McNeill of Ballintoy, County Antrim, and Elizabeth Ruthven, widow of Sir Dugald Stewart, 2nd Baronet, and thus though her mother a half-sister of James Stuart, 1st Earl of Bute. He went to school in Raphoe and attended Trinity College Dublin, graduating in 1727. He entered Middle Temple in 1729 and was called to the Bar in 1732.

== Career ==
He was elected to the Irish House of Commons for the city of Londonderry in 1739 and appointed Prime Serjeant at the Irish Bar on 6 October 1757. He was made Recorder of Derry in 1735. In 1759 he was made a Puisne Justice of the Court of King's Bench (Ireland), and on 1 August 1768 he was transferred to the Court of Exchequer (Ireland) as a Puisne Baron. He held this office until his death. On 13 December 1771 Scott and fellow Barons of the Exchequer Foster and Smyth, along with the Lord Chancellor Lifford and the Chancellor of the Exchequer Hamilton, were appointed Commissioners of Accounts for Ireland by Letters Patent.

His career seems to have been uneventful. At a time when all public figures, including judges, were very much in the public gaze, he seems to have aroused no strong feelings, for good or bad.

== Family ==
He married Hannah Gledstanes, daughter of Thomas Gledstanes, and had three sons:

- Thomas (died 1770), who was briefly Recorder of Londonderry;
- James, who inherited Willsborough and married Catherine Leslie, daughter of James Leslie, Bishop of Limerick, Ardfert and Aghadoe and his wife Joyce Lyster;
- Anthony (died 1770).
