= Tulsk (Parliament of Ireland constituency) =

Pre-1801 Irish constituency

- Former borough constituency for the Irish House of Commons
- County: County Roscommon
- Borough: Tulsk

–1801
- Replaced by: Disfranchised

Tulsk was a constituency represented in the Irish House of Commons from 1611 to 1800.

== Members of Parliament ==
=== 1692–1801 ===
Election	First MP		Second MP
1692	William Caulfeild		William Neave
1714	William Caulfeild		Arthur French
1715	John French		Thomas Caulfeild
1727	Toby Caulfeild		St George Caulfeild
1741	Thomas Caulfeild		St George Caulfeild
1747	Frederick Gore		St George Caulfeild
1751	Frederick Gore		Robert Cuninghame
1761	William Caulfeild		John Bagwell
1768	William Caulfeild		James Agar
1769	William Caulfeild		William Caulfeild
1771	Toby Caulfeild		William Caulfeild
1772	Nicholas Westby		William Caulfeild
1776	James Carique-Ponsonby		William Caulfeild
1783	James FitzGerald	Patriot	William Caulfeild
1786	James FitzGerald	Patriot	Hugh Crofton
1790	James FitzGerald	Patriot	Henry Cope
1798	Henry Irvine		Anthony Botet
1800	Henry Irvine		James Cuffe
1801	Constituency disenfranchised		
