= Naas (Parliament of Ireland constituency) =

Pre-1801 Irish constituency

- Former borough constituency for the Irish House of Commons
- County: County Kildare
- Borough: Naas

–1801
- Seats: 2
- Replaced by: Disfranchised

Naas was a constituency represented in the Irish House of Commons to 1801. The Parliament of Ireland merged with the Parliament of Great Britain to form the Parliament of the United Kingdom on 1 January 1801. Thereafter Naas was represented by the Members for County Kildare.

== Members of Parliament ==
- 1559–1560 John Sherlock and Henry Draycott
- 1585 James Sherlock and Walter Lewes
- 1613–1615 Christopher Sherlock and William Lattin
- 1634–1635 Christopher Sherlock and William Archbold
- 1639–1642 Christopher Sherlock (expelled for non-attendance) and Nicholas Sutton (expelled for rebellion)
- 1642–1649 Dr Dudley Loftus
- 1661–1662 George Carr and Sir John Hoey

=== 1689–1801 ===
Election	First MP	Second MP
1689	Viscount Dungan	Charles White
1692	John Aylmer	Nicholas Jones
1695	Richard Nevill	James Barry
1703	Alexander Gradon	Francis Spring
1711	Alexander Gradon	James Barry
1713	Thomas Burgh	Theobald Bourke
1727	Thomas Burgh	John Bourke
1731	Thomas Burgh	John Bourke
1759	Richard Burgh	John Bourke
1761	Richard Burgh	Maurice Keating
1763	John Bourke	Maurice Keating
1768	John Bourke	John Bourke
1777	John Bourke	Thomas Allan
1783	John Bourke	Hugh Carleton
1787	John Bourke	Sir Richard Gorges-Meredyth, 1st Bt
1790	John Bourke	John Bourke
1791	James Bond	John Bourke
1795	James Bond	George Damer, Viscount Milton
January 1798	Hon. Thomas Pelham	Hon. Francis Hely-Hutchinson
1798	John Macartney	Hon. Francis Hely-Hutchinson
1801	Constituency disenfranchised	
