= Donamon Castle =

Fortified house in County Roscommon, Ireland

Coordinates: 53.632°N 8.319°W

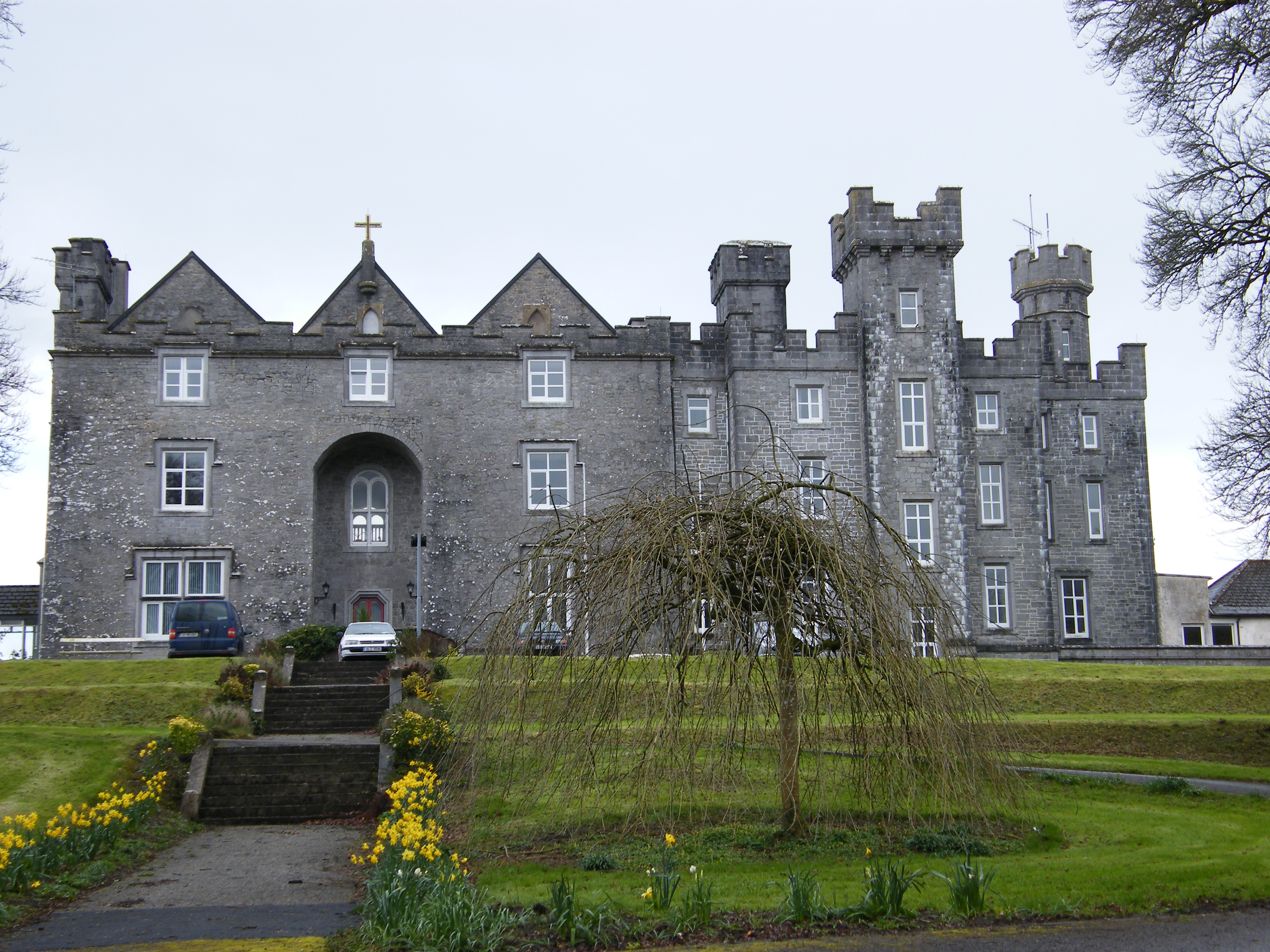
The castle in 2008

Donamon Castle, or more correctly, Dunamon Castle (Irish: Dún Iomáin), is one of the oldest inhabited buildings in Ireland and stands on raised ground overlooking the River Suck in County Roscommon.

== History ==
There was a fort here from early times (hence the name Dún Iomáin, fort of Iomán), but the first recorded reference to "Dún Iomghain" is in the Annals of the Four Masters for the year 1154.

It was the seat of the Ó Fionnachta chief of Clann Chonnmhaigh, one of the two main branches of this Connacht family. In 1232, Adam de Staunton fortified the site further as part of the Norman conquest, but that structure was retaken and demolished by the native O'Connors the following year.

A rebuilt castle was occupied in 1294 by de Oddingseles, who died the following year. The de Birminghams then took over but it was again destroyed by the O'Connors.

In 1307 the O'Connors were supplanted by a branch of the Burkes, the head of which was known as MacDavid. The MacDavid Burkes occupied the site for the next 300 years. During the seventeenth century, a junior branch of the Caulfeild family came to own the castle and surrounding territory, and continued to own it throughout the Protestant Ascendancy.

In late 1932, an IRA unit, under the command of Seán McCool and Mick Price, took over Donamon Castle to set up an IRA training camp.

In 1939 the Divine Word Missionaries came to Ireland and purchased the castle from the Irish Land Commission. The missionary society constructed several new buildings to create a campus for training people before they went into the field.

The training campus was managed by the Irish Wheelchair Association as a "National Holiday Centre" until its closure in 2019. The centre was reopened in 2022 to house Ukrainian refugees arriving into Ireland by Roscommon County Council with help from Irish Aid and Roscommon Lions Club.
