= Toby Caulfeild (1694–1740) =

Irish politician

Toby Caulfeild (1694–1740) was an Irish politician.

Caulfeild was born in Dunamon and educated at Trinity College, Dublin. He represented Tulsk from 1727 to 1740.
