= Thomas Caulfeild (Irish politician) =

Irish politician

Thomas Caulfeild (1688–1747) was an Irish politician.

Caulfeild was born in Chester and educated at Trinity College, Dublin. He represented Tulsk from 1715 to 1727 and again from 1741 to 1747.
