= Patrick Dun =

Sir Patrick Dun MD
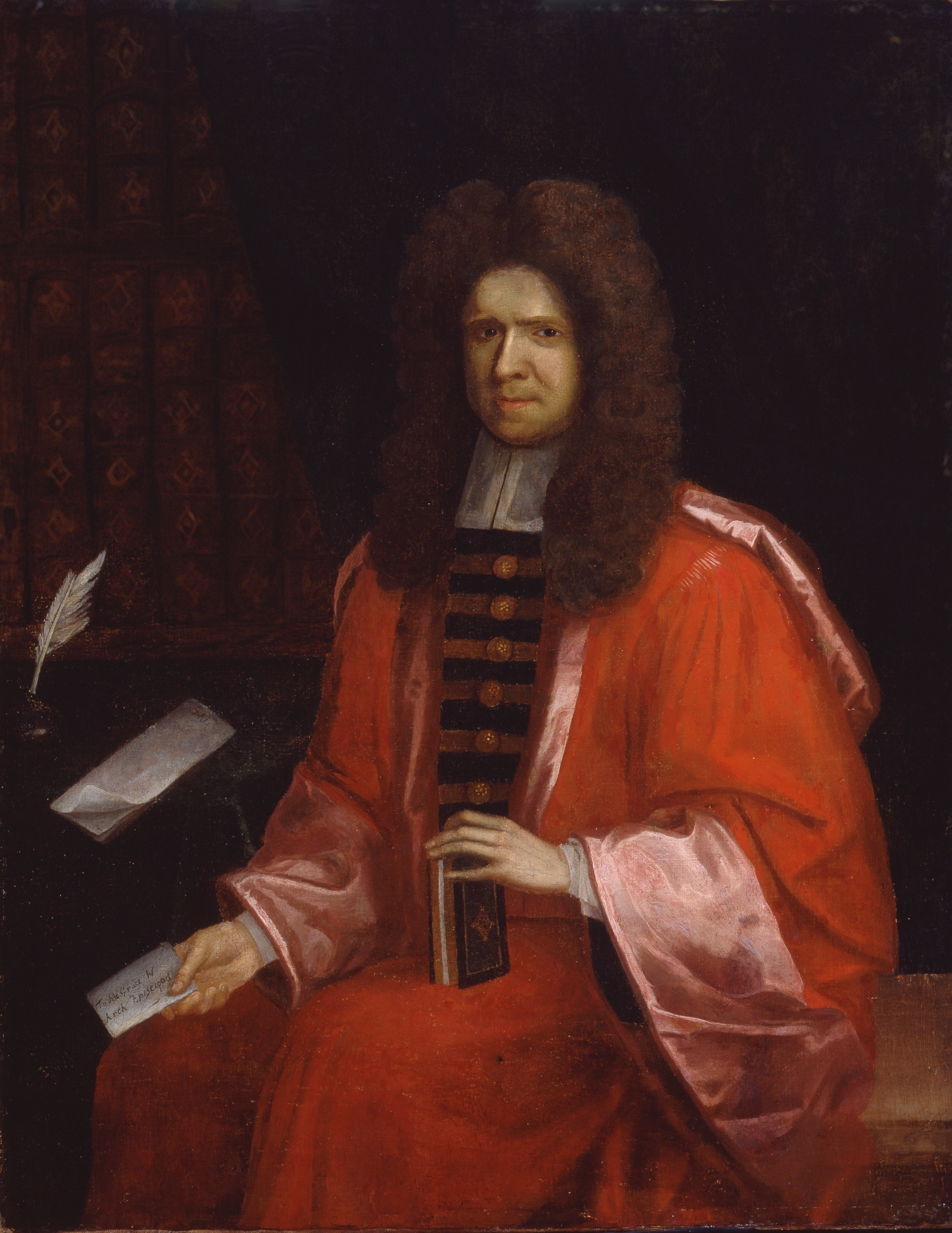
- Sir Patrick Dun, by Thomas Pooley
- Born: January 1642; Aberdeen, Scotland
- Died: 24 May 1714 (aged 72)

Academic background
- Education: Marischal College; Trinity College, University of Dublin

Sir Patrick Dun (January 1642 — 24 May 1714) was an Irish physician, and president of the Royal College of Physicians of Ireland.

== Life ==
He was born in Aberdeen, Scotland, the son of Charles Dun and his wife Catherine Burnet and the nephew of Patrick Dun, Principal of Marischal College in Aberdeen.

He appeared in 1676 in Dublin as "physician to the state and my lord-lieutenant" (according to Sir John Hill, quoted in Culloden Papers, London, 1865), and was elected one of the fourteen fellows of the Dublin College of Physicians in 1677. From 1681 to 1687 he was president of the college, and again in 1690–3, in 1696, 1698, and 1706. He was elected in 1692 to the Irish House of Commons for Killyleagh and sat there until 1695. He was then elected for Mullingar, and held that seat until 1713. Dun accompanied King William III to the Battle of the Boyne.

Dun was evidently a physician in Dublin and had great social influence. He was the friend and medical adviser of Archbishop King (1650–1729), and of many other influential people.

== Legacy ==
On his death in 1713, Dun left his personal library to the college.

He also left a personal bequest of his income for the construction of Anatomy House within the grounds of Trinity College Dublin which also housed the newly founded medical school of which he was also the main force in its creation at the same time. The building was designed by surveyor general Thomas Burgh and carried out by Isaac Wills from 1710-11, around the same time as both men were working on the construction of the college library, now referred to as The Old Library.

In 1815 Sir Patrick Dun's Hospital was founded and named in his honour, by the College of Physicians, noted physicians William Stokes and of Robert James Graves served in the hospital. The hospital was closed in 1986. In 1998 it became the venue for civil marriage ceremonies.
