= William Robinson (British architect) =

British architect, military engineer and politician

The Right Honourable Sir William Robinson
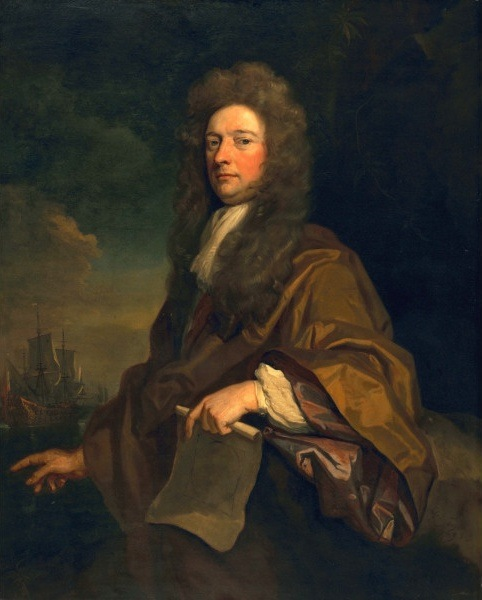
- Portrait of Robinson by Godfrey Kneller (1693)

Surveyor General of Ireland
- In office February 1671 – April 1700 Serving with William Molyneux (1684–1698)
- Preceded by: John Morton
- Succeeded by: Thomas de Burgh

Personal details
- Born: 1644 Yorkshire, England
- Died: 1712 (aged 67–68) London, Great Britain
- Resting place: St Martin-in-the-Fields, London, England
- Spouse: Margery Tooke
- Profession: Architect and politician

Sir William Robinson PC(I) (May 1644 – October 1712) was a British architect, military engineer and politician. He held several posts in the Dublin Castle administration, including as Surveyor General of Ireland from 1671 until 1700. He was an influential figure in the development of classical architecture in Ireland, designing many buildings in the English Baroque style, particularly in Dublin. Towards the end of his life, Robinson was implicated in several financial scandals.

== Biography ==
Robinson was born in Yorkshire, England, the son of Walter Robinson. He was baptised on 18 May 1644. He likely trained in architecture in England and arrived in Ireland in around 1670.

On 7 February 1671 Robinson was appointed Surveyor General of Ireland by John Berkeley in his first year of office as Lord Lieutenant of Ireland, holding the post alongside that of engineer general and being appointed master of the ordnance soon after. By 1675, he had overseen numerous constructions and repairs in Dublin, including Chapelizod House and Dublin Castle. In 1677 he was appointed keeper of the largely idle parliament building and from 1678 he leased its grounds and gardens. From 1677 he designed and was involved in the construction of Charles Fort in County Cork, and at the end of 1678 he drew up a report on the condition of Irish fortifications. Other projects included the construction of Essex Bridge in Dublin and the reconstruction of Lismore Cathedral, County Waterford. His patent as surveyor general was renewed on 10 April 1679, with his salary doubled to £300 on the recommendation of James Butler, 1st Duke of Ormond.

In the 1680s, Robinson designed the Royal Hospital Kilmainham under the direction of Ormond, inspired by Les Invalides in Paris. The Royal Hospital is now regarded as Robinson's finest architectural achievement and it is the largest surviving building of its period in Ireland; for some time its design was erroneously attributed to Sir Christopher Wren. In 1682 Robinson oversaw the construction of Ormond Bridge in Dublin. In 1684 he was appointed auditor and registrar of the Royal Hospital. On 31 October 1684 his patent as surveyor general was renewed again, although this time he shared the appointment with William Molyneux, who paid Robinson £250 in return for a half-share of the patent. In 1686 Robsinson undertook the reconstruction of St. Michan's Church, Dublin.

After Richard Talbot, 1st Earl of Tyrconnell was appointed Lord Lieutenant of Ireland in 1687, Robinson left the country for England. He returned to Ireland in 1689 during the Williamite War in Ireland, during which time he held several posts in the Williamite army, including comptroller general of provisions and commissary general of pay and provisions. He was made a commissioner for forfeited estates in 1690 and resumed his post as surveyor general. In 1692, he was appointed deputy paymaster general of the forces in Ireland. In March 1692 he was made a justice of the peace for Westminster and Middlesex. In August 1692 Robinson, as deputy vice-treasurer of Ireland, travelled to London and secured an emergency loan of £30,000 for the Irish exchequer.

Robinson was elected to the Irish House of Commons as a Member of Parliament for Knocktopher in 1692. In 1693, he became commissioner for stating the accounts of the army. That same year his portrait was painted by Godfrey Kneller. In 1695, he was elected to sit for Wicklow. In parliament he served on numerous committees. He rebuilt the old Four Courts on St. Michael's Hill in 1695. He was a signatory of the Association of 1696. After 1697, he became one of the commissioners for the Ormond estates, and was also appointed governor of the Royal Hospital, Kilmainham. He resigned as surveyor general on health grounds in April 1700; he was replaced by Thomas de Burgh.

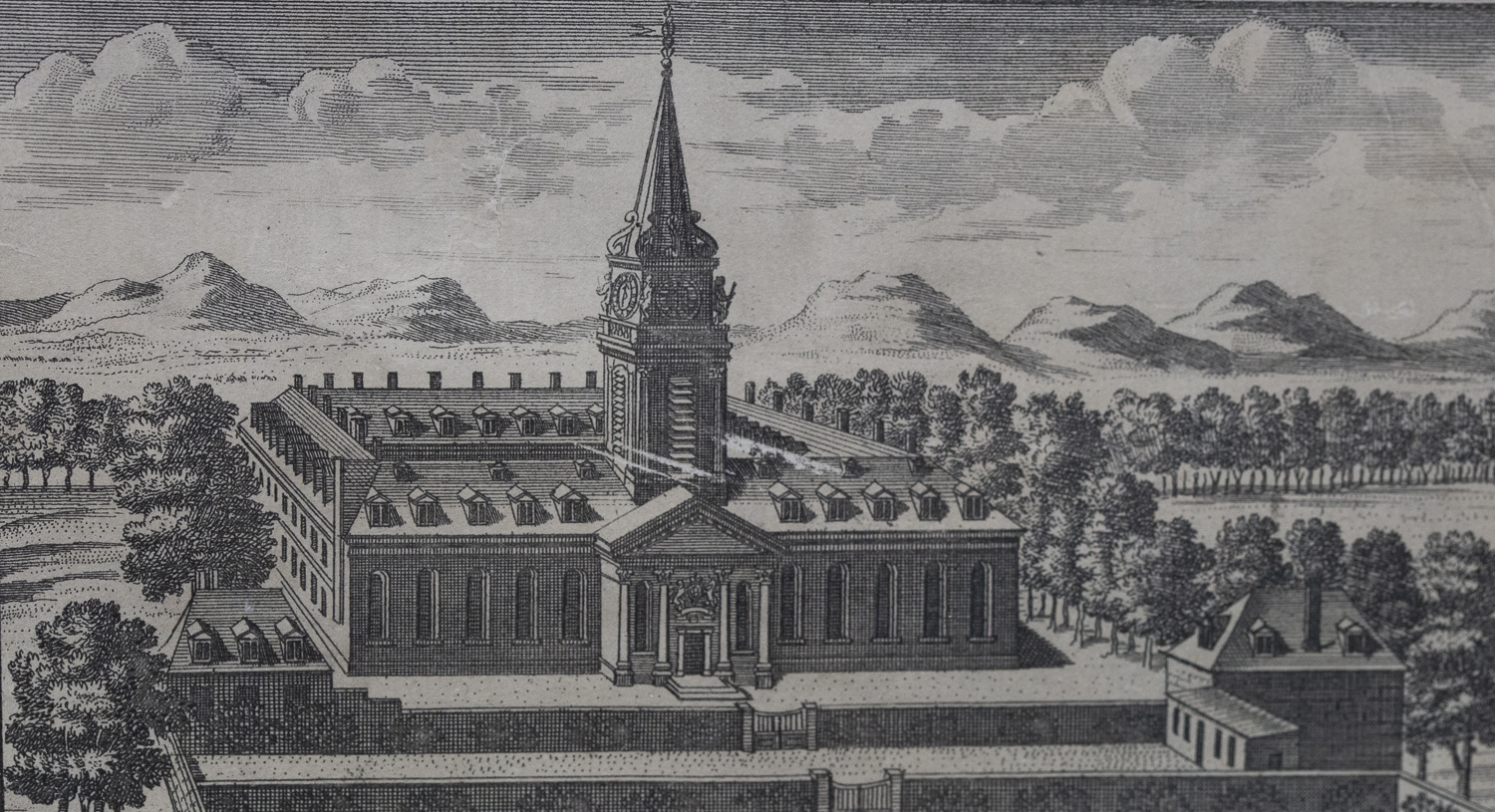
A 1728 depiction of the Royal Hospital Kilmainham, one of Robinson's most notable designs

On 19 June 1702, Robinson was knighted and he was appointed to the Privy Council of Ireland the same year. His final major architectural work came in 1703, when he designed Marsh's Library. In 1703, he was elected as the MP for Dublin University. In April and June of that year, he purchased forfeited former Jacobite lands in County Carlow and County Louth. In October 1703 he was accused of fraud in parliament after allegedly misrepresenting the extent of the public debt, causing a major financial scandal. On 16 October 1703 he narrowly avoided expulsion from parliament; a subsequent resolution stated his unfitness for public employment. He was briefly imprisoned in Dublin Castle, but was released on 27 November after the matter was investigated. In 1706 he left Ireland and returned to England amidst allegations of defrauding the army's clothing accounts and extorting its suppliers; in 1709 he was found to have defrauded other moneys intended for maintenance purposes.

On 18 January 1677, Robinson had married Margery Tooke (d.1708) of Hertfordshire. Robinson, who had no children, died in October 1712, and was buried in St Martin-in-the-Fields, London. He owned residences in Carlow, Dublin, Lancashire, and Surrey, and at the time of his death was reputedly worth in excess of £50,000.

== List of works by William Robinson ==
- St. Mary's Abbey, Dublin (1676) – partial demolition
- Essex Bridge (1676)
- Charles Fort (1677–82)
- Chichester House (1677–78)
- Lismore Cathedral (1679)
- Ormonde Bridge (1682)
- Dublin Castle (prior to 1685)
- Chapelizod House (prior to 1685)
- St. Michan's Church, Dublin (1686)
- Old Four Courts, Winetavern Street (1695)
- Royal Hospital Kilmainham (1679–87)
- St Mary's Church, Mary Street, Dublin (1700–01)
- Marsh's Library (1705)

== Gallery of major works ==
Gallery of Robinson's major works in Ireland
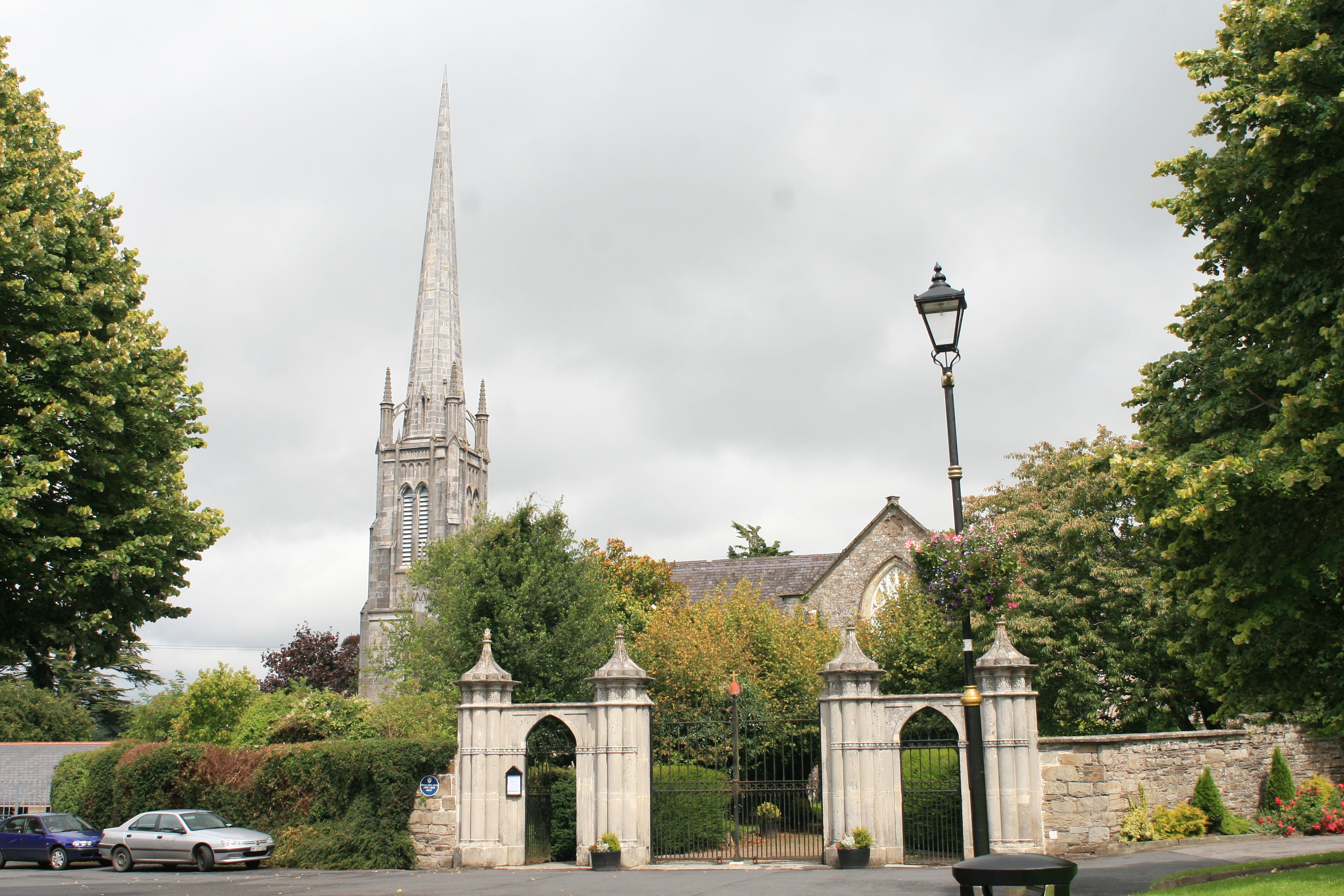
Lismore Cathedral, completed in 1679. The gateway was completed at a later date.

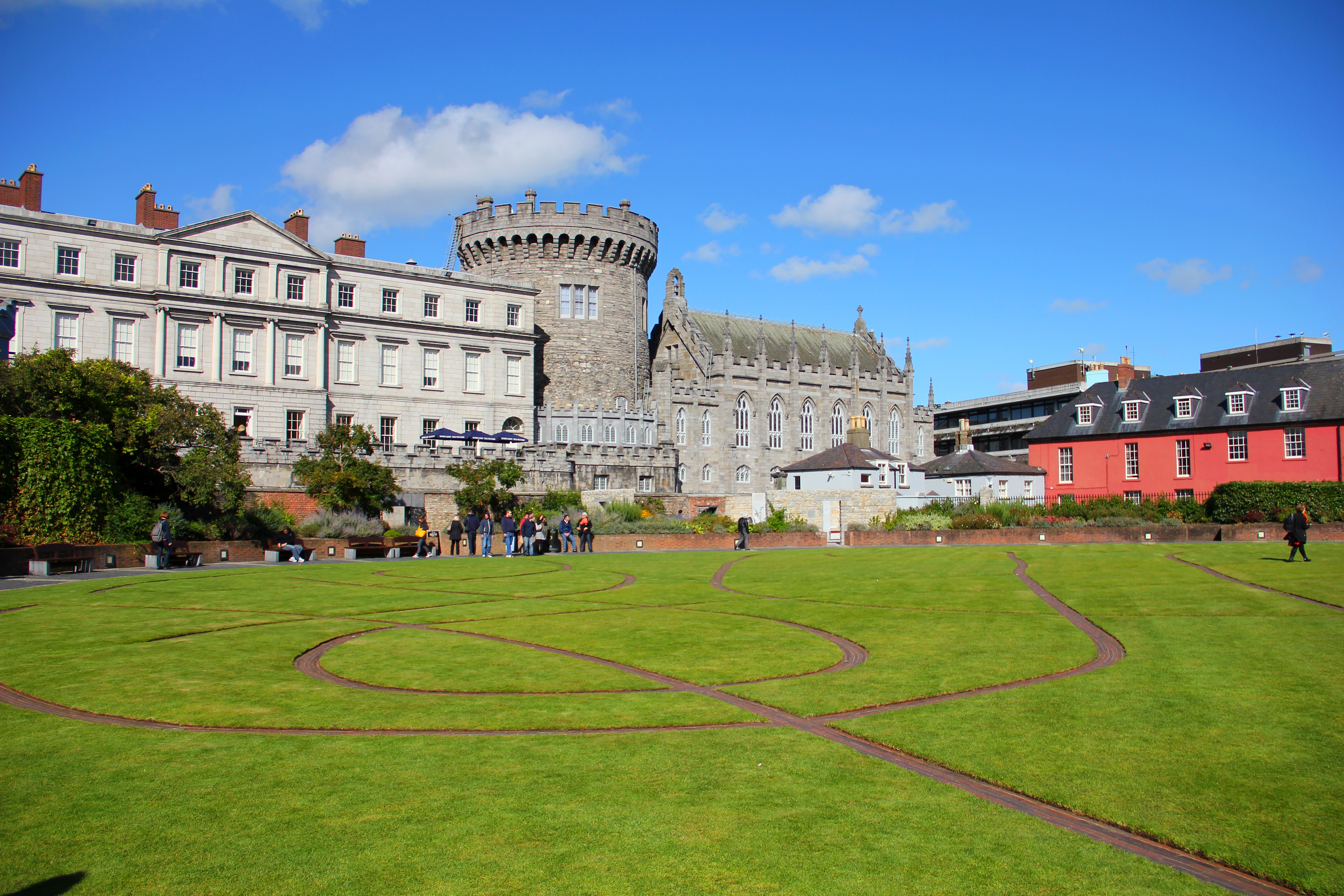
Dublin Castle, various works in the 1670s and 1680s.

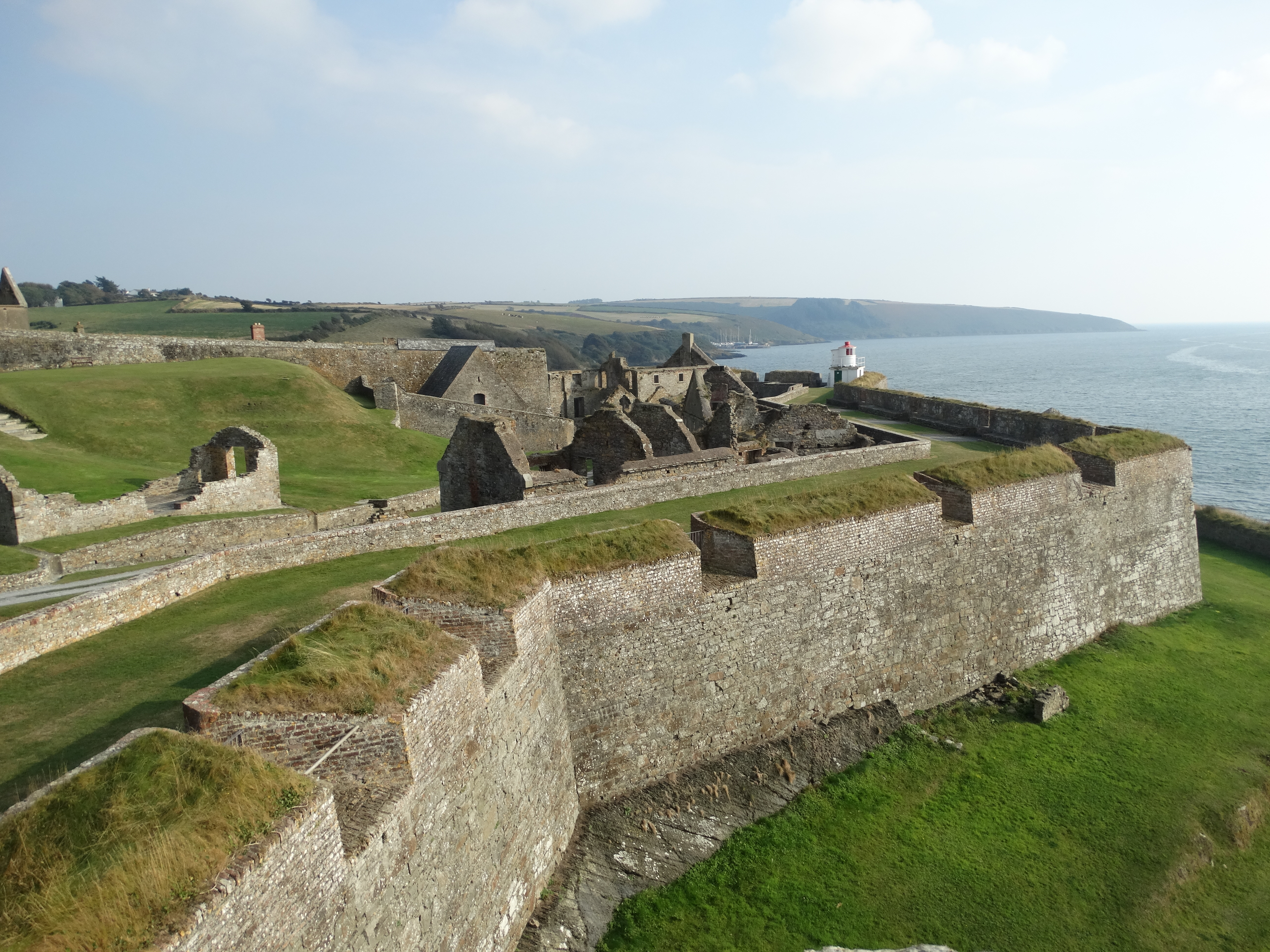
Charles Fort, completed in 1682.

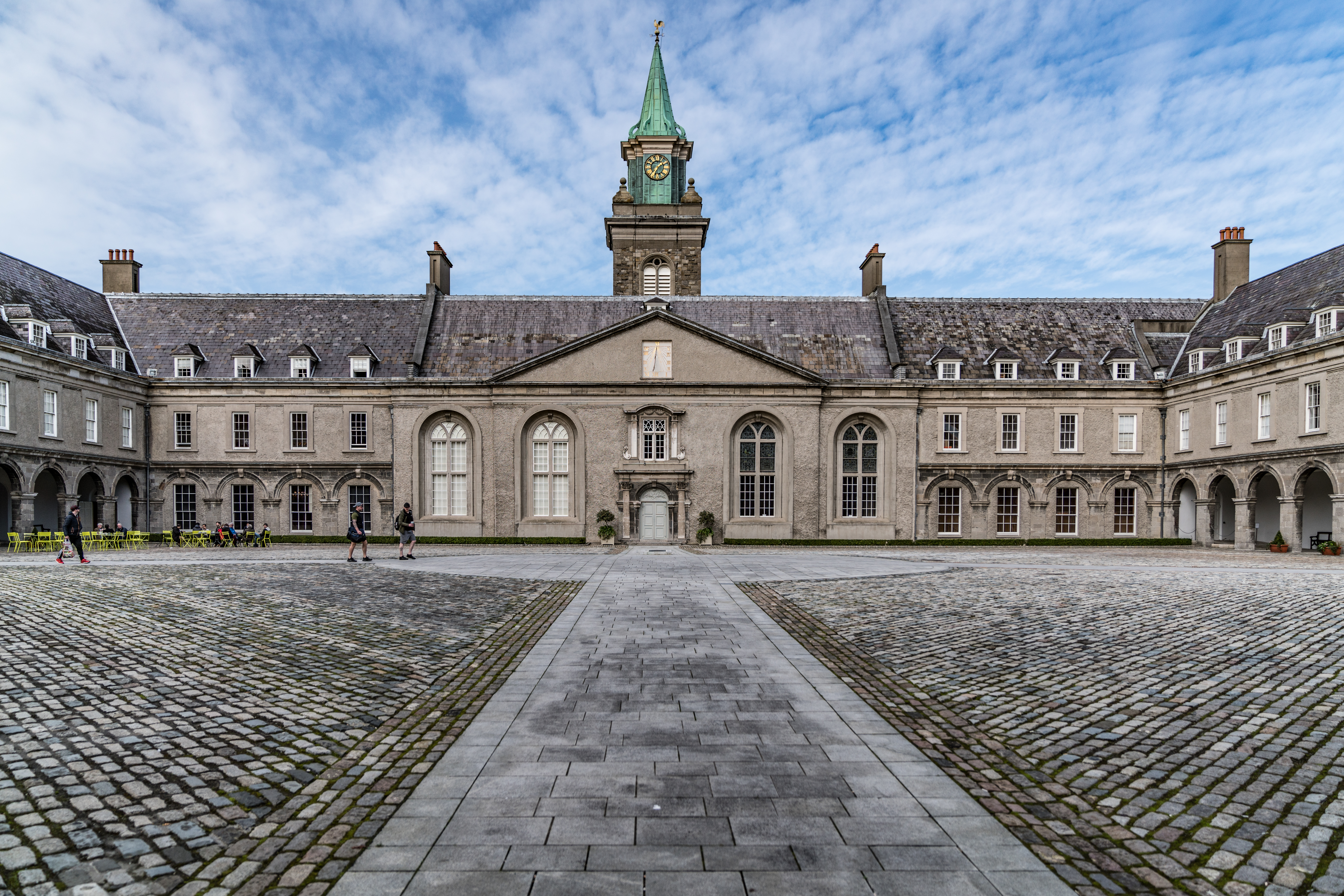
Royal Hospital Kilmainham, completed in 1684.

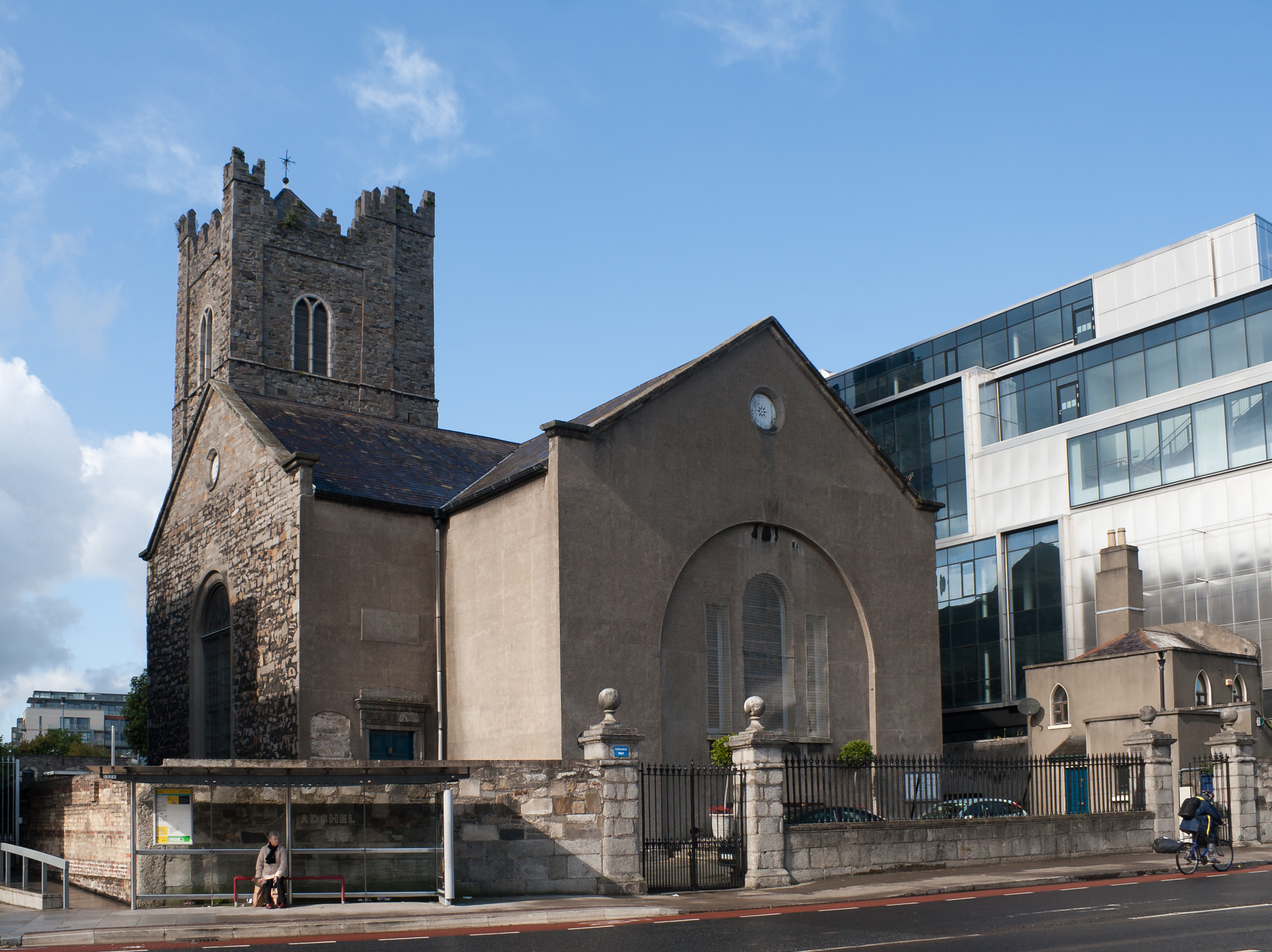
St. Michan's Church, Dublin, reconstructed in 1686.

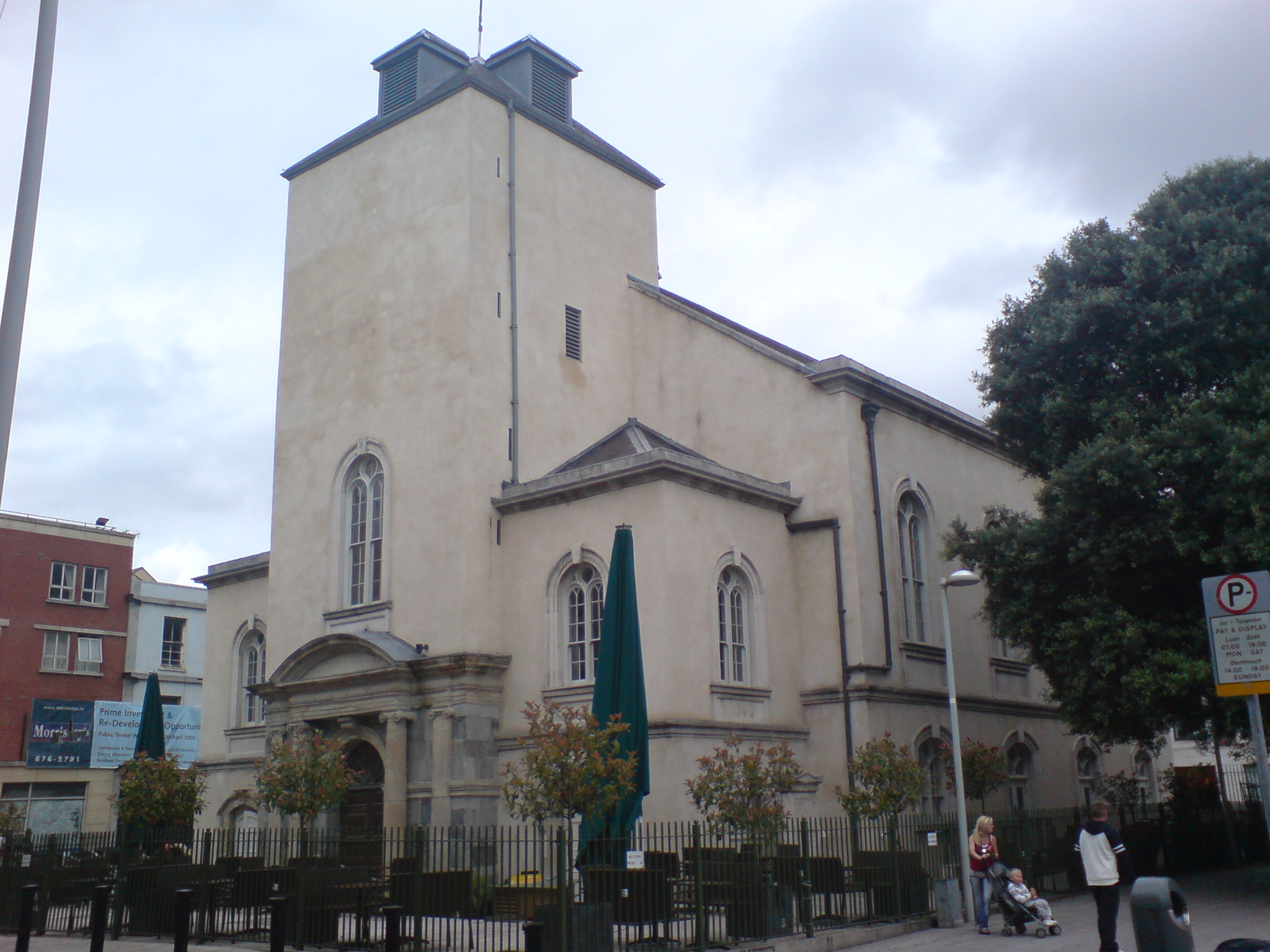
St Mary's Church, Mary Street, Dublin, completed in 1701.

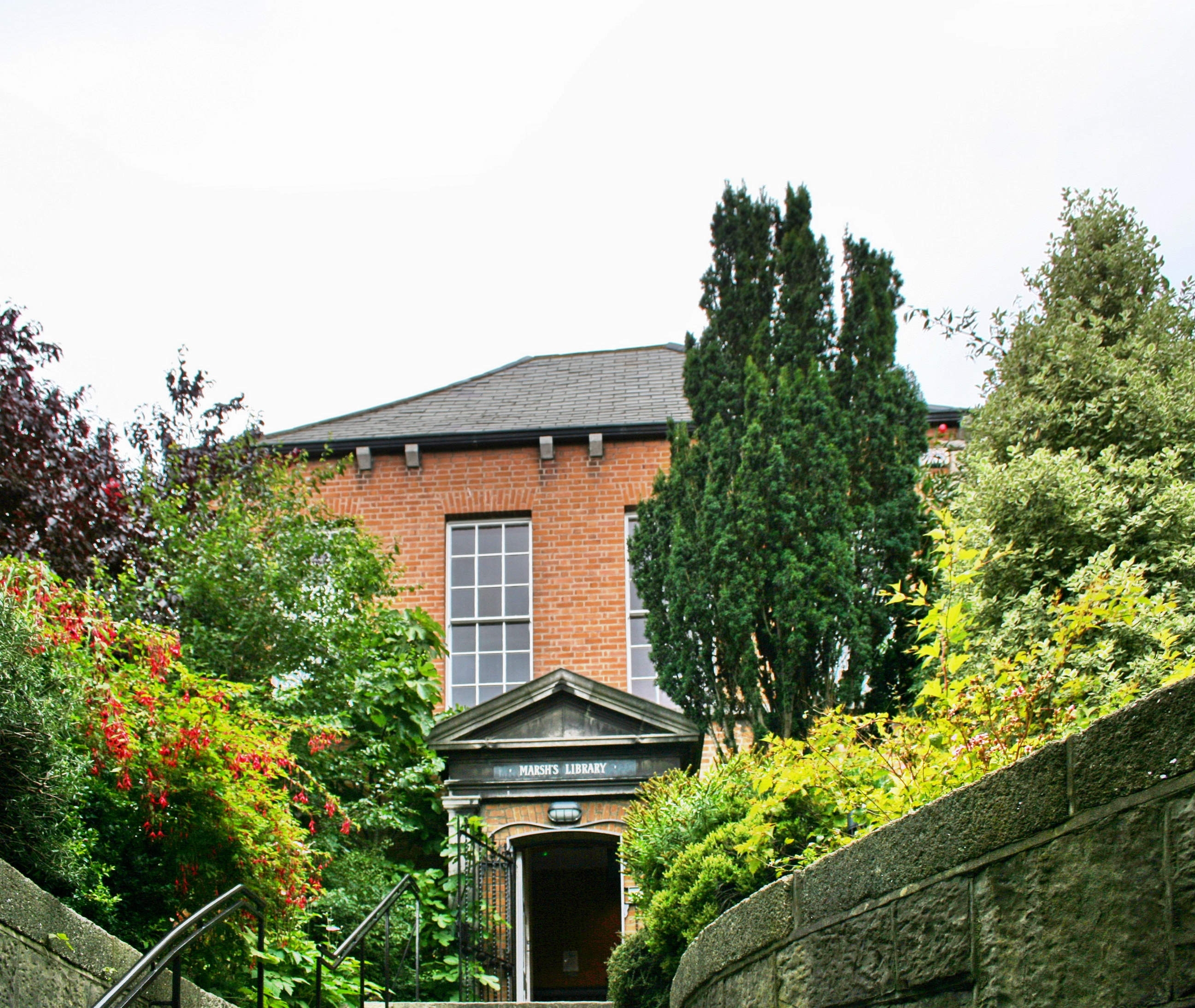
Marsh's Library, completed in 1705.

Government offices
| Preceded by John Morton | Surveyor General of Ireland; 1670–1700 | Succeeded by Thomas de Burgh |
Parliament of Ireland
| Preceded by Harvy Morris; Redmond Purcell | Member of Parliament for Knocktopher; 1692–1693; With: Anthony Maude | Succeeded by Edward Worth; Blayney Sandford |
| Preceded by Nathaniel King; Sir Richard Reynell, Bt | Member of Parliament for Wicklow; 1695–1699; With: Nathaniel King (1695–1696); Christopher Carleton (1696–1699) | Succeeded by Christopher Carleton; John Price |
| Preceded by Richard Aldworth; William Crow | Member of Parliament for Dublin University; 1703–1712; With: Edward Southwell Sr. | Succeeded by Marmaduke Coghill; John Elwood |
