= Viceregal Lodge =

Viceregal Lodge may refer to:

Residences of the Lord Lieutenant of Ireland

- Áras an Uachtaráin, Dublin (1780s–1922)
- Chapelizod House, County Dublin (1680s)

Residences of the Viceroy of India

- Rashtrapati Niwas, Shimla (1888), now houses the Indian Institute of Advanced Study
- Viceregal Lodge, New Delhi (1912–1931), used until the construction of Viceroy's House and now the residence of the Vice Chancellor of the University of Delhi

== See also ==
- Raj Bhavan (disambiguation)
