= The Old Library, Trinity College Dublin =

Library in Dublin, Ireland

The Old Library
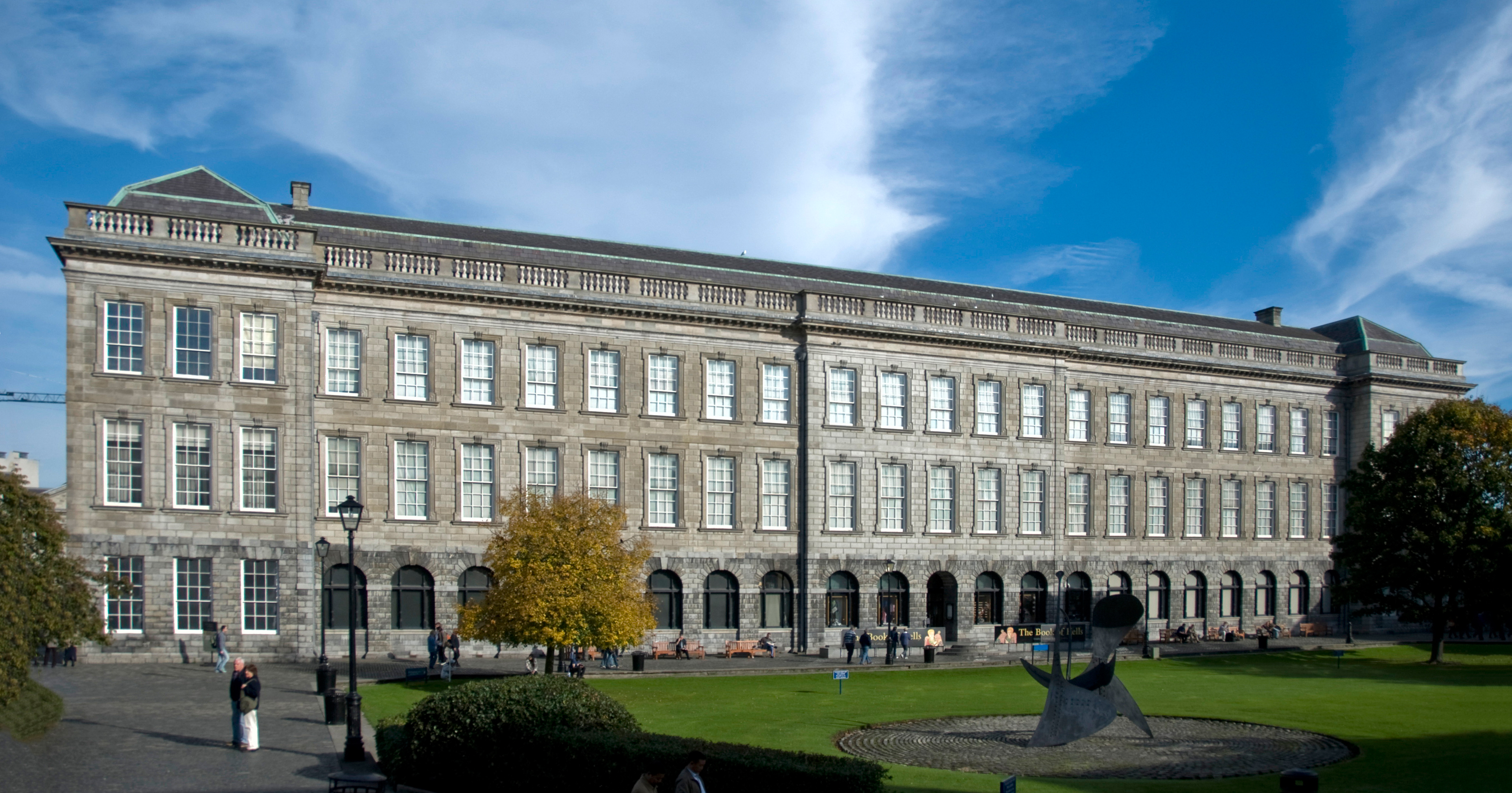
- The library viewed from the west in 2008

General information
- Type: House
- Architectural style: Neo-classical, Palladian
- Classification: Protected structure
- Location: Dublin, Ireland
- Coordinates: 53.3439436°N 6.2575176°W
- Elevation: 20 m (66 ft)
- Groundbreaking: 1709
- Construction started: 1712
- Estimated completion: 1730

Height
- Height: 20 m (66 ft)

Dimensions
- Other dimensions: 27 bay

Technical details
- Material: calp limestone, sandstone (original) granite (19th-century replacement)
- Floor count: 3

Design and construction
- Architect: Thomas Burgh (1670–1730)

The Old Library is an early 18th-century building within the campus of Trinity College Dublin and forms part of the Library of Trinity College Dublin. It contains the barrel-vaulted Long Room which also houses the 8th-century Book of Kells. On completion, the building was significantly larger than the college's collection of books, and it wasn't until the mid-19th century that further storage was required.

== History ==
Trinity College Library was originally founded under the auspices of James Ussher in the 17th century.

The Old Library was built in stages between 1709 and 1732 to the design of Thomas Burgh and overseen at various stages by Isaac Wills, with the original project budget extended in 1717.

From 1710-11, Burgh and Wills also worked together on constructing Anatomy House nearby within the grounds of the college with the funding being provided by a bequest from Patrick Dun; it also created the college's first medical and anatomical school at the same time in 1711.

Various other notable craftsmen are recorded as working on the library, including Henry and Moses Darley as stonecutters between 1712-14, and Moses again in 1722. The stone is also a mixture of calp limestone and sandstone from the Darley family quarries in Scrabo near Newtownards, County Down.

Additionally, details record Francis Quin as bricklayer from 1718-24, carpentry by Charles Brooking in 1724, joinery by John Sisson in the 1730s and painting work and ceilings of the long room by William Halfpenny from 1733-34. Richard Castle also oversaw works on the building, including the staircase around 1750.

=== Marble busts ===
Fourteen marble busts were commissioned in the mid-1740s by bequest of Claudius Gilbert. Eight of these originals are signed by Peter Scheemakers, with the remaining six likely by Louis-François Roubiliac.

Later, the collection expanded to include one of Claudius Gilbert himself, by Simon Vierpyl in 1758; Vierpyl also made two others. A bust of John Lawson was sculpted by Patrick Cunningham in 1759, one of Patrick Delany by John van Nost the younger, while John Henry Foley and Thomas Kirk carved further busts in the 19th century. Four female busts were added in 2023: Rosalind Franklin, Augusta Gregory, Ada Lovelace and Mary Wollstonecraft.

=== 19th-century alterations ===
The library underwent a series of refurbishments and extensions in the 19th century. The original sandstone facade had begun to decay and was replaced with a darker facade of granite, using stone from Ballyknockan quarry.

Internally, the flat ceiling, as seen in Malton's illustration of 1792, was replaced with the now famous barrel-vaulted version by Thomas Newenham Deane and Benjamin Woodward between 1859 and 1861. An additional floor of bookcases was also added and was supported by granite columns.

The ground floor was originally arcaded and was only filled in by Thomas Drew from 1889-92.

=== 21st-century renovation ===
A redevelopment project commenced in 2022 and will include a restoration and rebuilding element from 2027-30.

=== Gallery ===
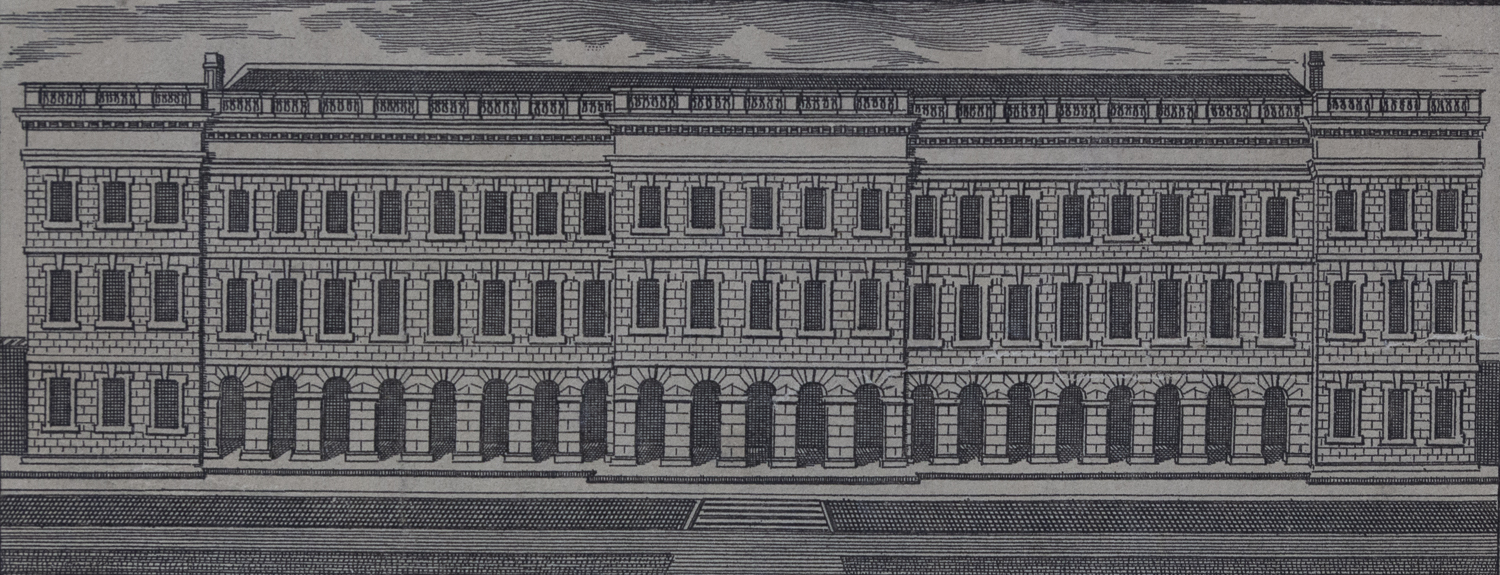
An image of the 'Colledge Library' (sic), as shown in Charles Brooking's map of Dublin (1728)

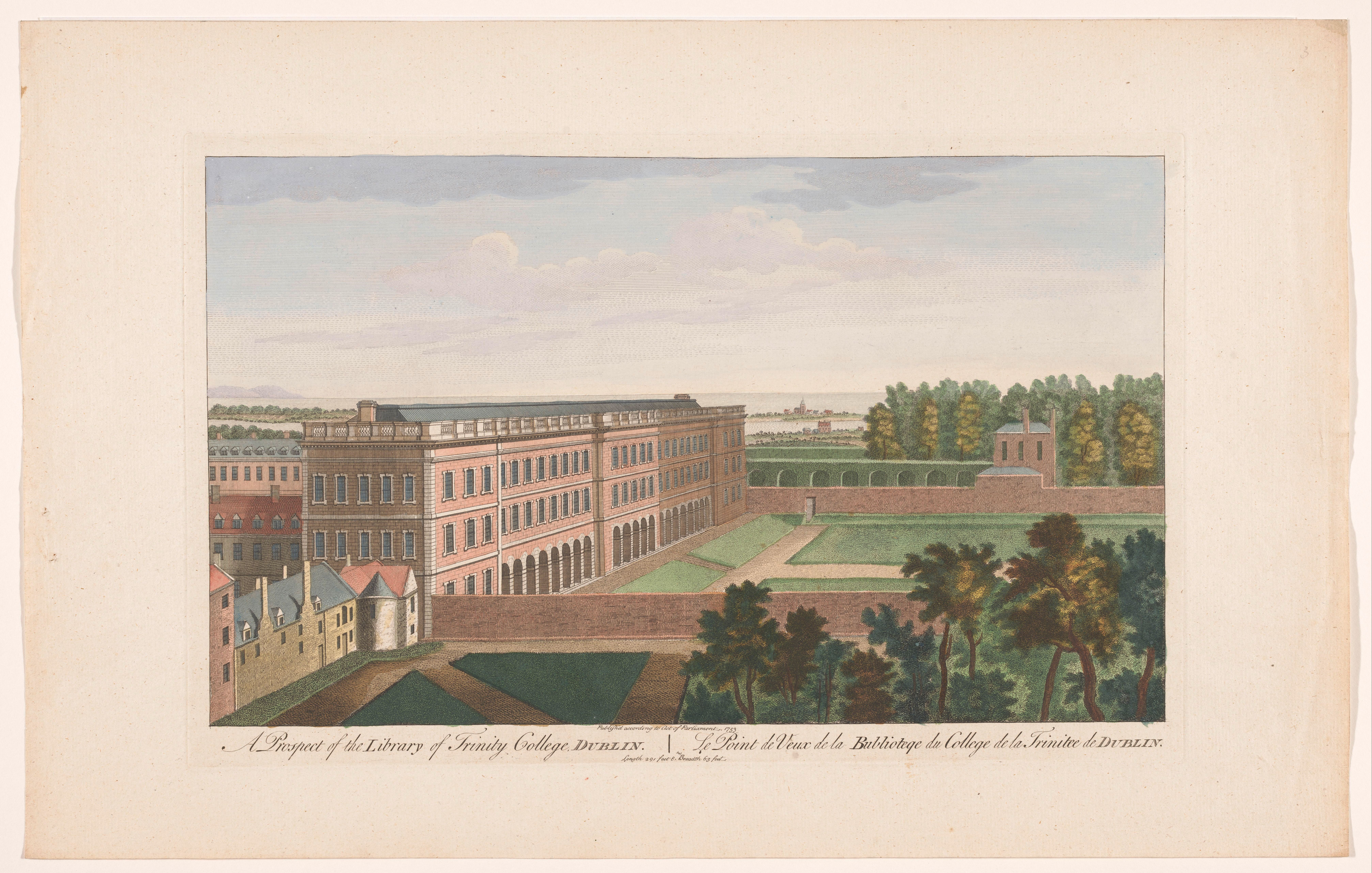
1753 illustration of the library and Anatomy House (right) by Joseph Tudor. In the background can also be seen The Rubrics

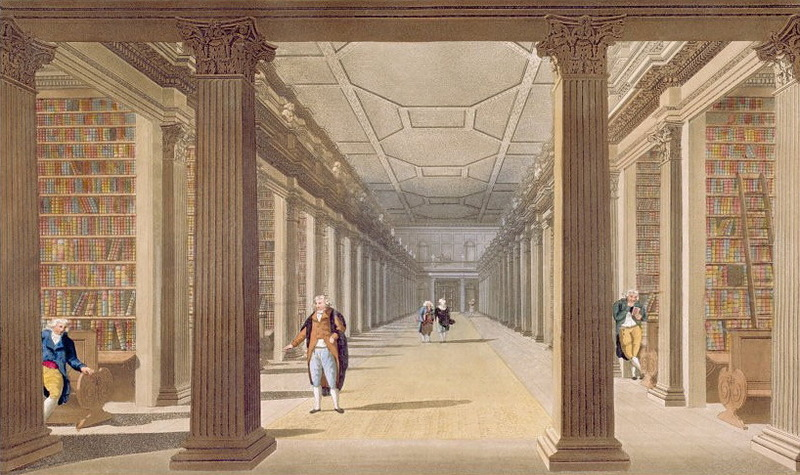
An image of the interior of the library from James Malton in 1792 before the addition of an extra floor and barrel vaulted ceiling

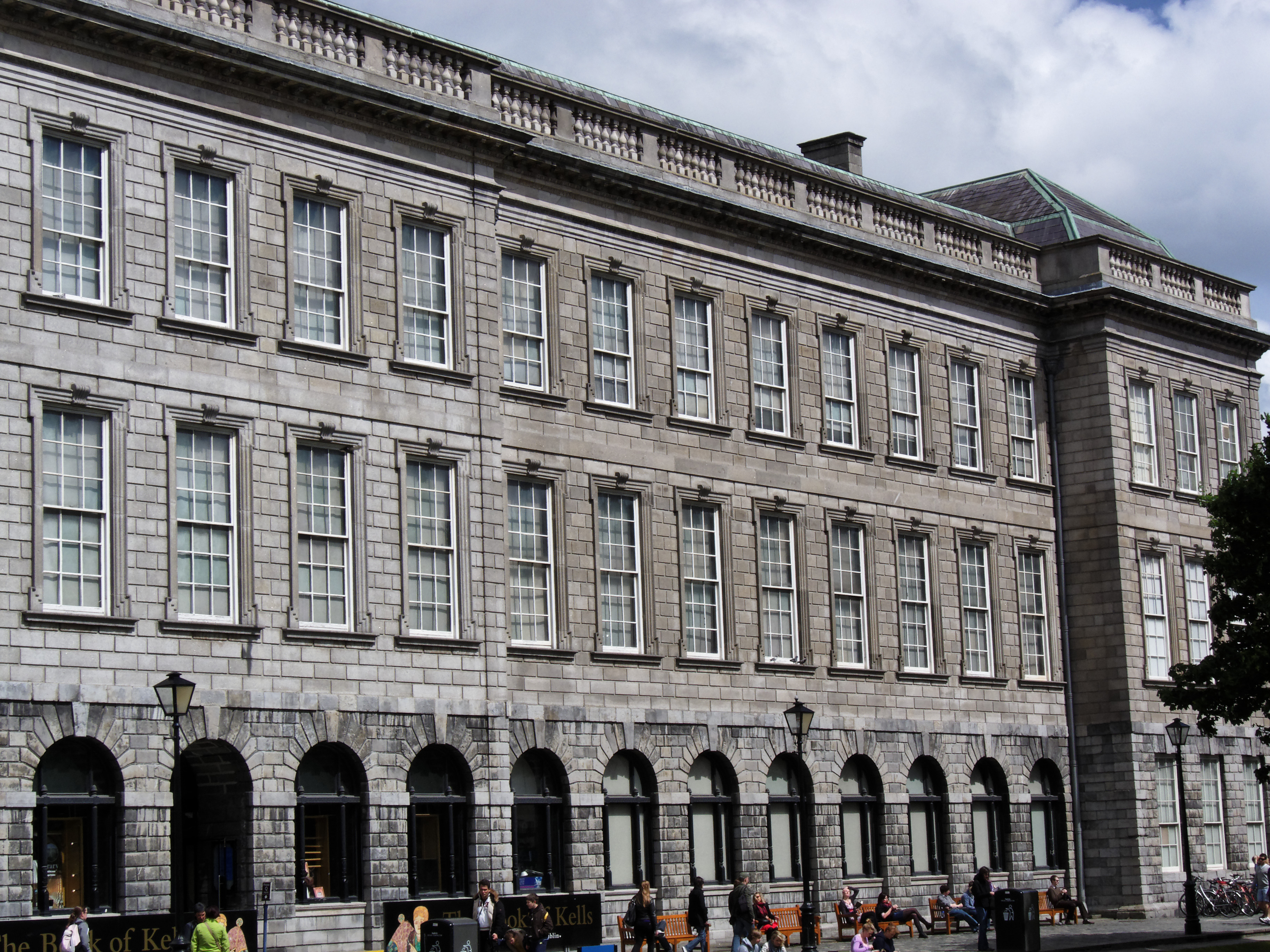
Facade of library

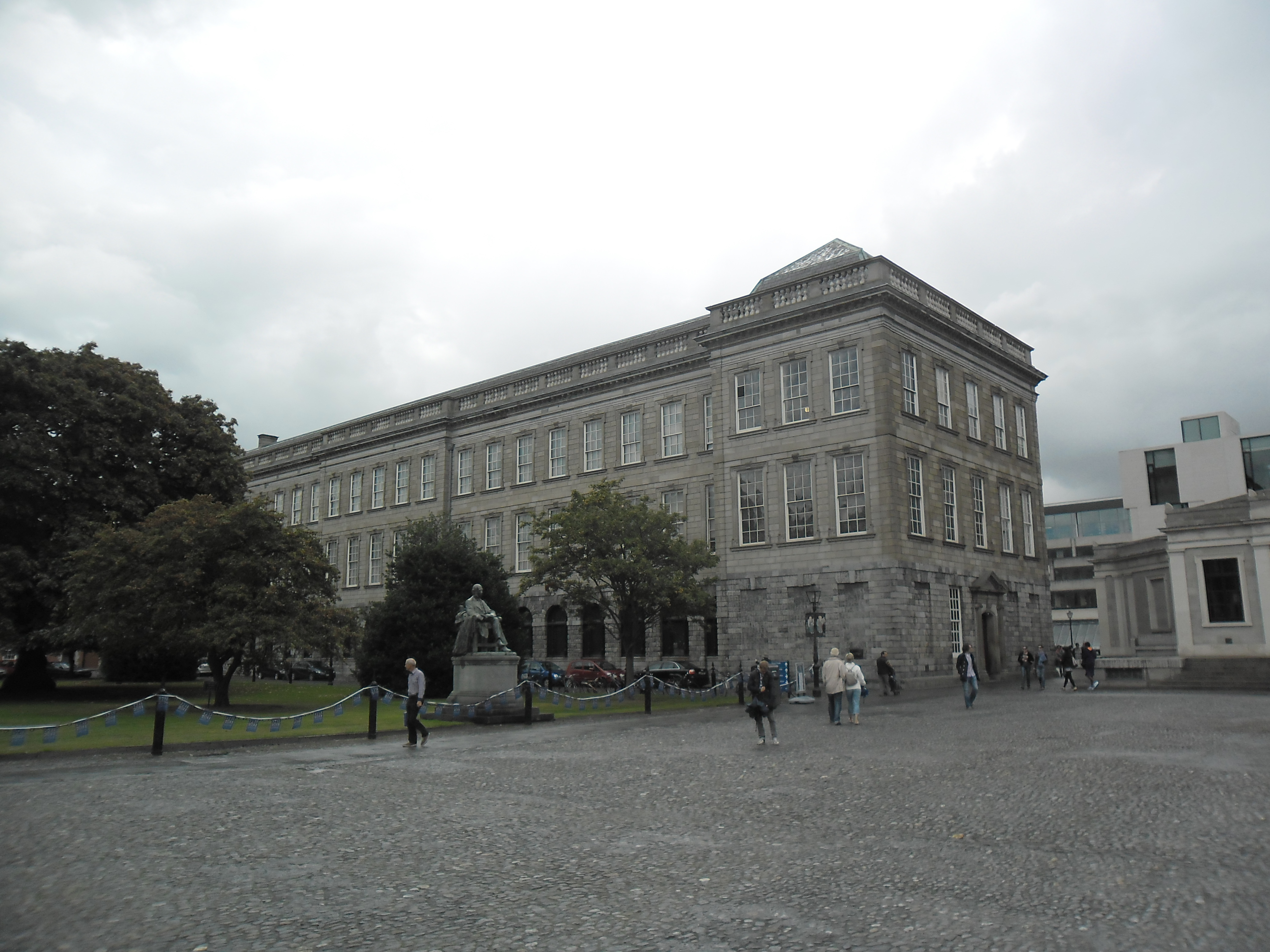
The library from front square

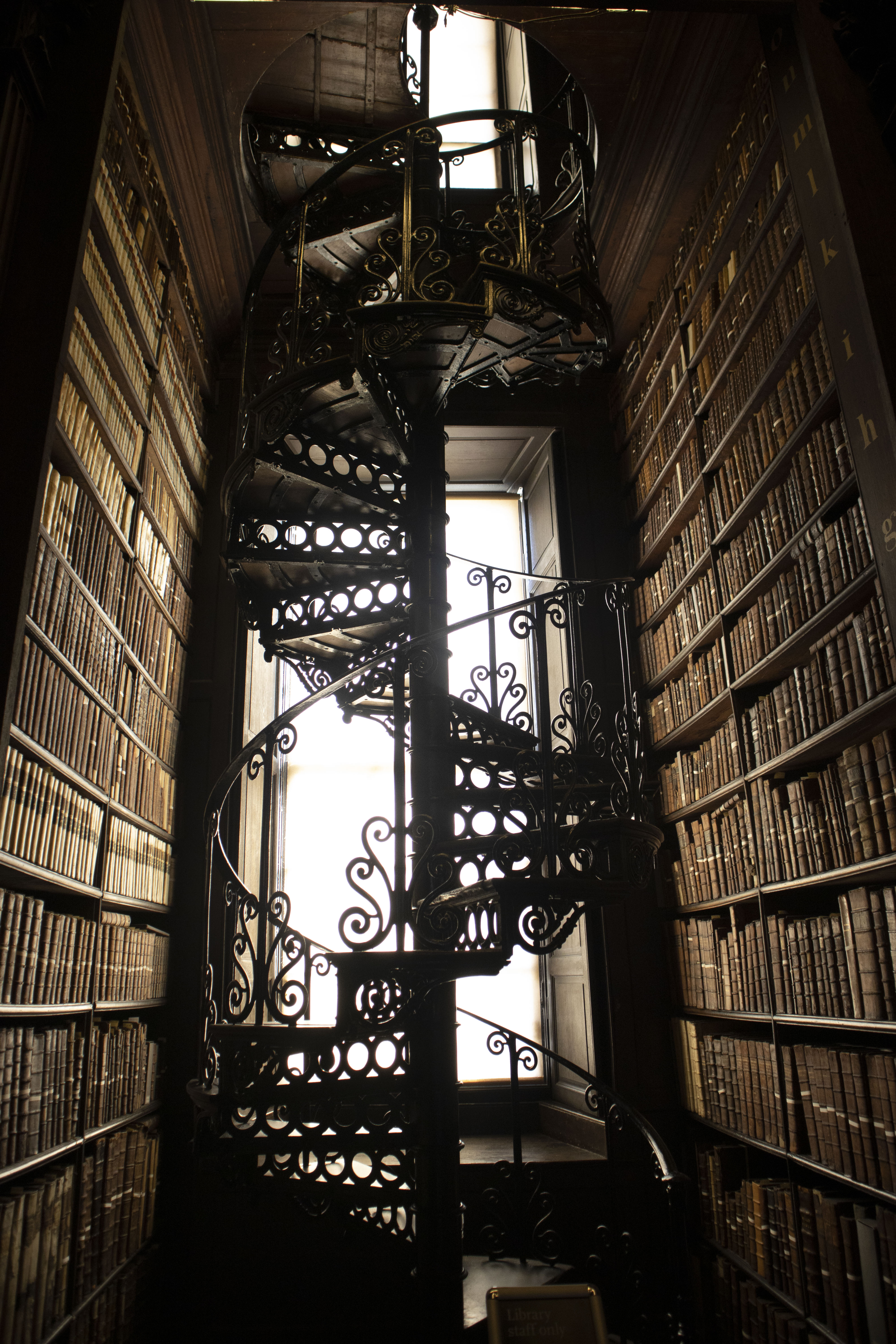
Spiral staircase in the library

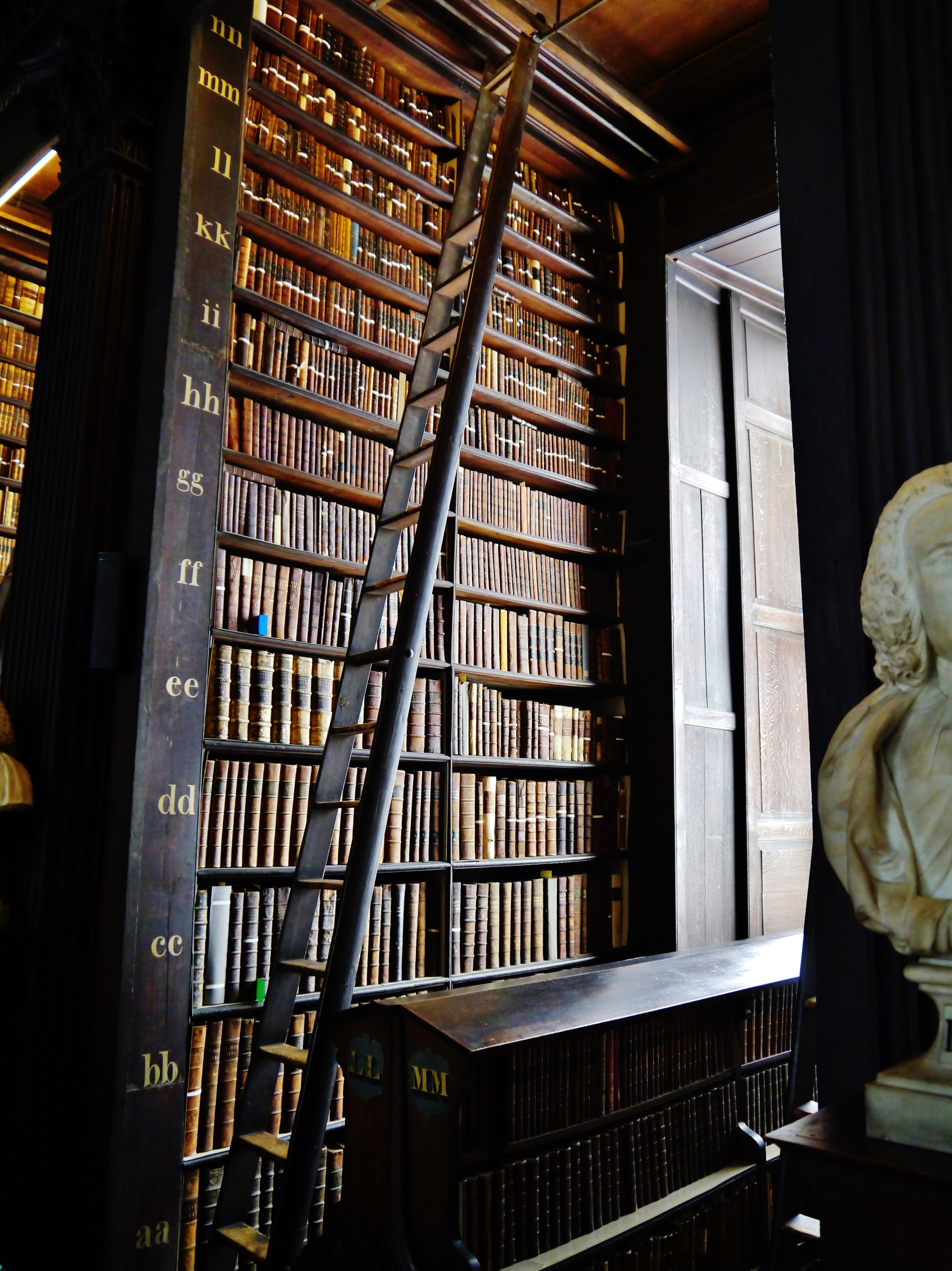
Stairs and ladder in the library

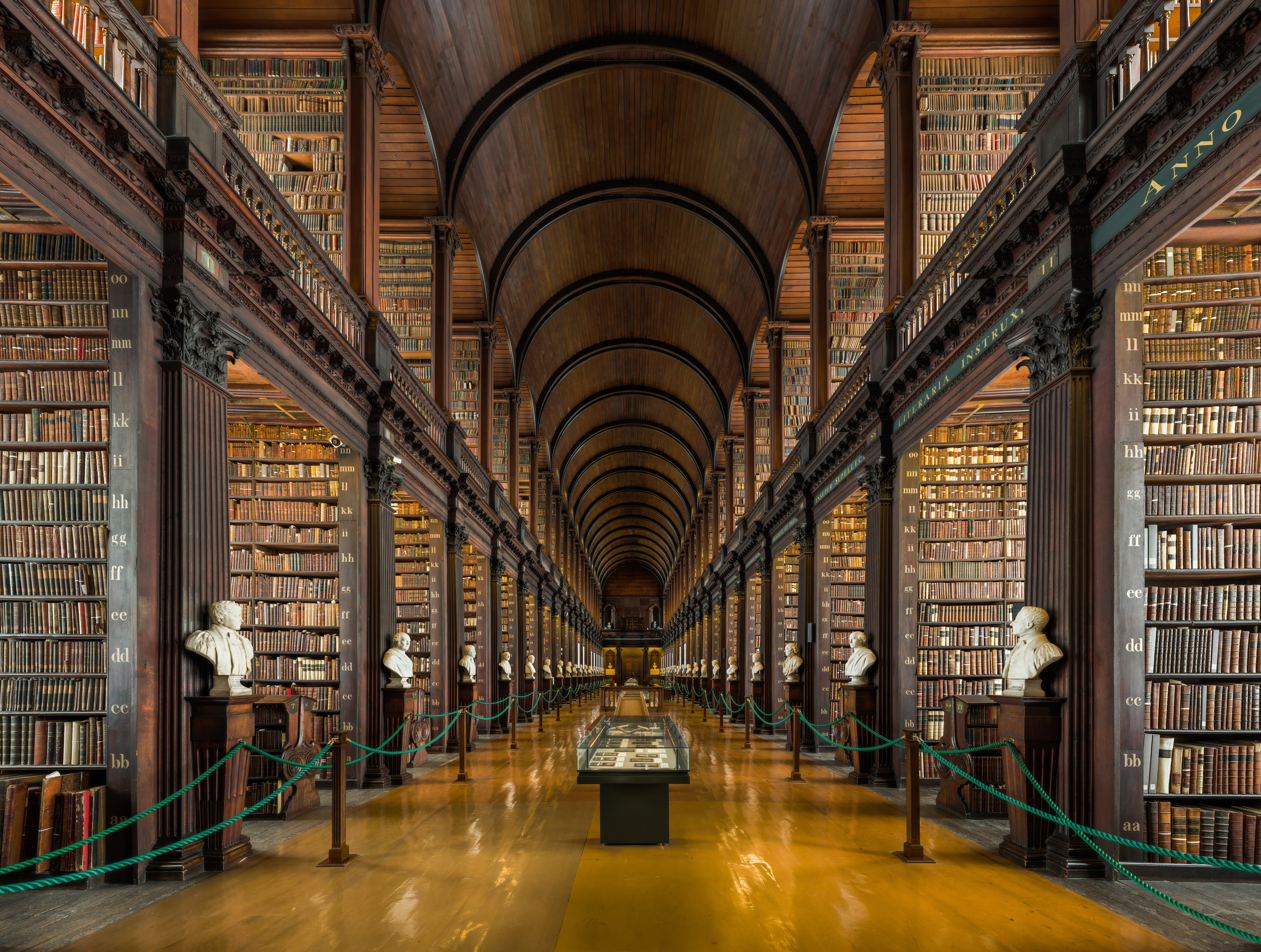
Interior and gallery

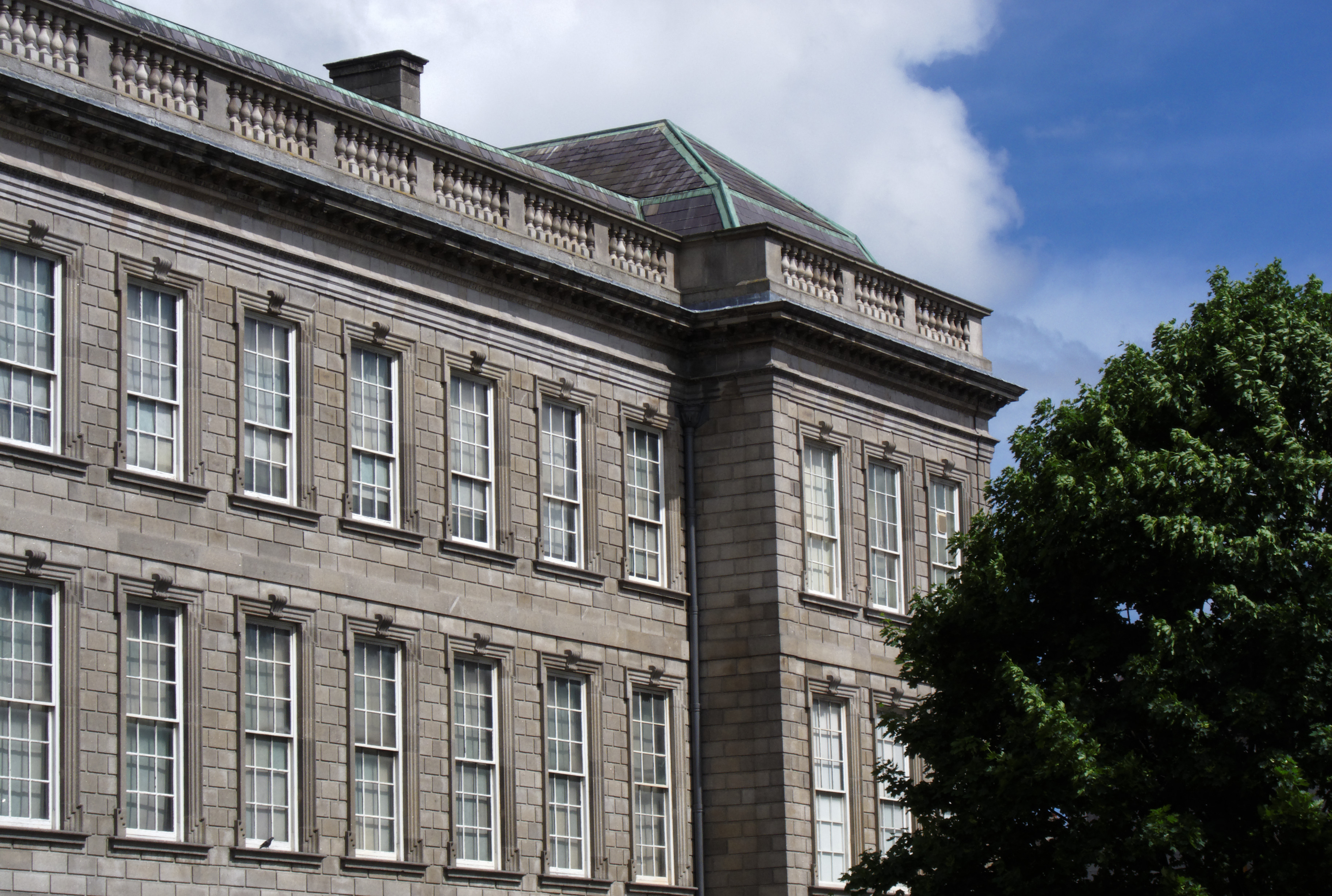
Roof detailing

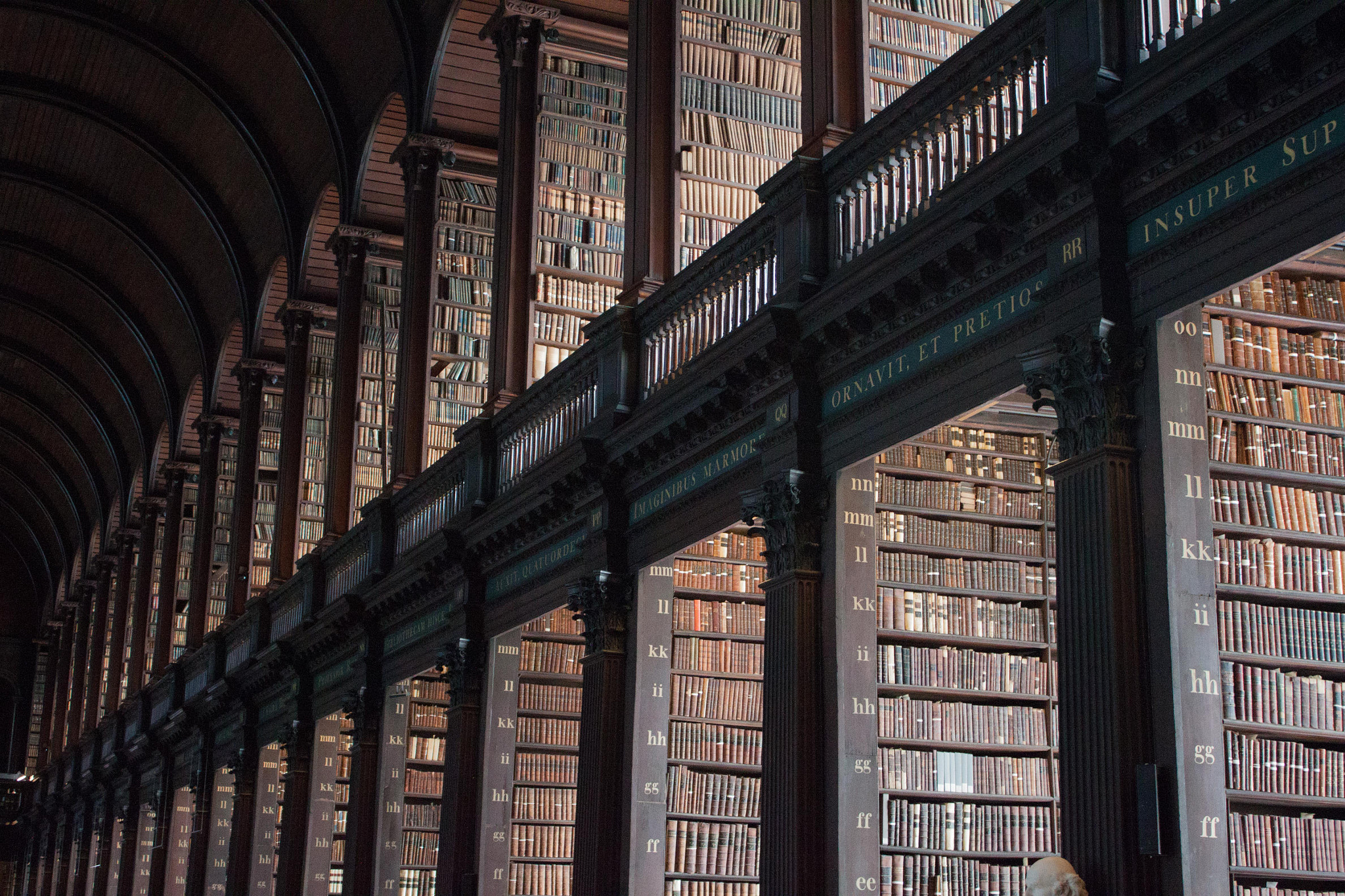
Shelving

== See also ==
- List of libraries in the Republic of Ireland
