= St. Michan's Church, Dublin =

17th-century church in Ireland

- Cill Michin
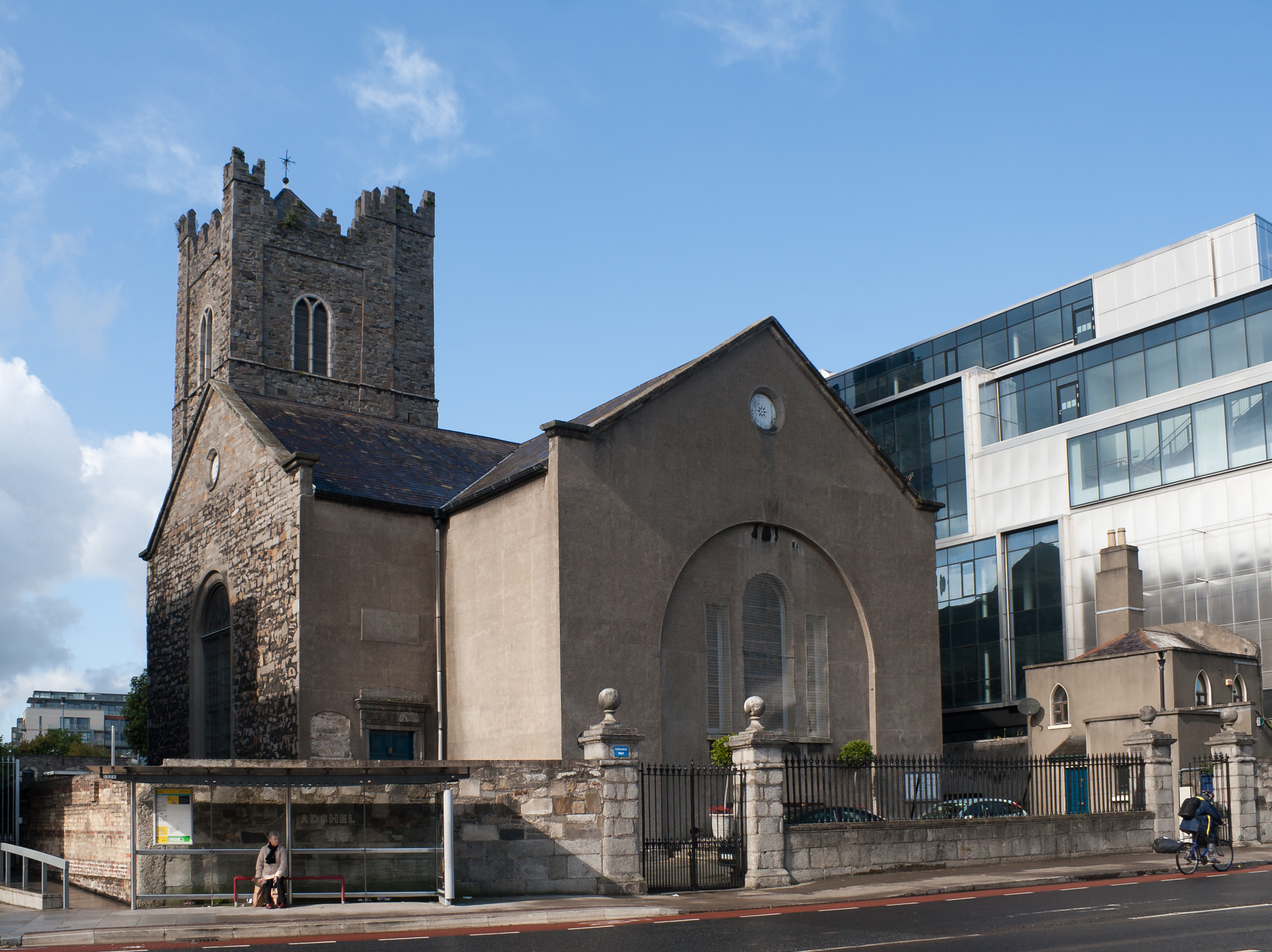
- St Michan's Church from Church Street
- St. Michan's Church, Dublin
- 53.3474°N 6.2755°W
- Location: Dublin
- Country: Ireland
- Denomination: Church of Ireland
- Previous denomination: Pre-Reformation Catholic (until 1530s)
- Website: cathedralgroupdublin.ie

History
- Founded: 1095 – Original chapel 1686 – Current structure 1825 – Renovated
- Dedication: St. Michan (5th century)

Architecture
- Architect: William Robinson (1686)
- Architectural type: Vernacular

Administration
- Province: Province of Dublin
- Diocese: Diocese of Dublin and Glendalough
- Parish: Christ Church

St. Michan's Church /ˈmaɪˌkən/ is a Church of Ireland church located in Church Street, Dublin, Ireland. The first Christian chapel on this site dated from 1095, and operated as a Catholic church until the Reformation. The current church dates from 1686, and has served Church of Ireland parishioners in Dublin for more than 300 years.

The church is known for its vaults, which contain a number of 'mummified' remains. In 2019, a man broke into the church's crypt and stole the heads of two mummies, including that of an 800-year-old body called "The Crusader". While the heads were subsequently recovered, a fire set in the crypt in June 2024 resulted in the destruction of five mummies, including "The Crusader".

== History ==
=== Architecture ===
Built on the site of an early Norse chapel from 1095, St. Michan's is the only parish church on the north side of the Liffey surviving from a Viking foundation.

The current structure dates largely from a reconstruction undertaken under William Robinson in 1686, and a former almshouse (later used as church offices) was built on the grounds c. 1720. The church was renovated c. 1825, and a two-storey vestry added on the northern side of the church.

While the exterior of the church may be modest, the interior has some fine woodwork, and an organ (dated 1724) on which Handel is said to have composed his Messiah.

=== Interments ===
The vaults of St. Michan's uniquely contain many mummified remains. The walls in the vaults contain limestone, which has kept the air dry, creating ideal conditions for preservation. The remains preserved in the vaults have included the 400-year-old body of a nun, a six-and-a-half-foot man popularly believed to have been a crusader, a body with its feet and right hand severed, and the Sheares brothers—Henry and John—who took part in the 1798 rebellion. The various holders of the title Earl of Leitrim were also interred here.

Several grave markers, within the adjoining cemetery, date to the mid-17th century.

=== Vandalism and arson incidents ===
St. Michan's crypts have been repeatedly damaged by vandalism, including two arson attacks.

In July 1996, vandals broke into one of the church's five burial vaults, removed bodies from their coffins and started a fire using rags and paraffin. The vault was destroyed. Firefighters extinguished the blaze, although the water used also damaged the remains. The disturbed bodies were reinterred during a church service. The four undamaged vaults remained open to visitors, while the destroyed vault was permanently closed. Recalling the incident 23 years later, in 2019, David Pierpoint, Archdeacon of Dublin and rector of St. Michan's Church, said the vandals had dragged bodies onto the ground and appeared to be playing football with their heads.

Over the weekend of 23 and 24 February 2019, an intruder again entered the crypt. The mummy known as "the Crusader" was decapitated and its head stolen along with another skull. The remains of the nun were damaged, while other bodies, coffins and the family vault of mathematician William Rowan Hamilton were also disturbed. The stolen remains were recovered by Gardaí in early March 2019. Brian Bridgeman pleaded guilty to burglary and five counts of criminal damage, including two counts of damaging a dead body, and was sentenced to 28 months' imprisonment in July 2019. Following restoration work and improved security, the crypt reopened to visitors on 9 July 2019.

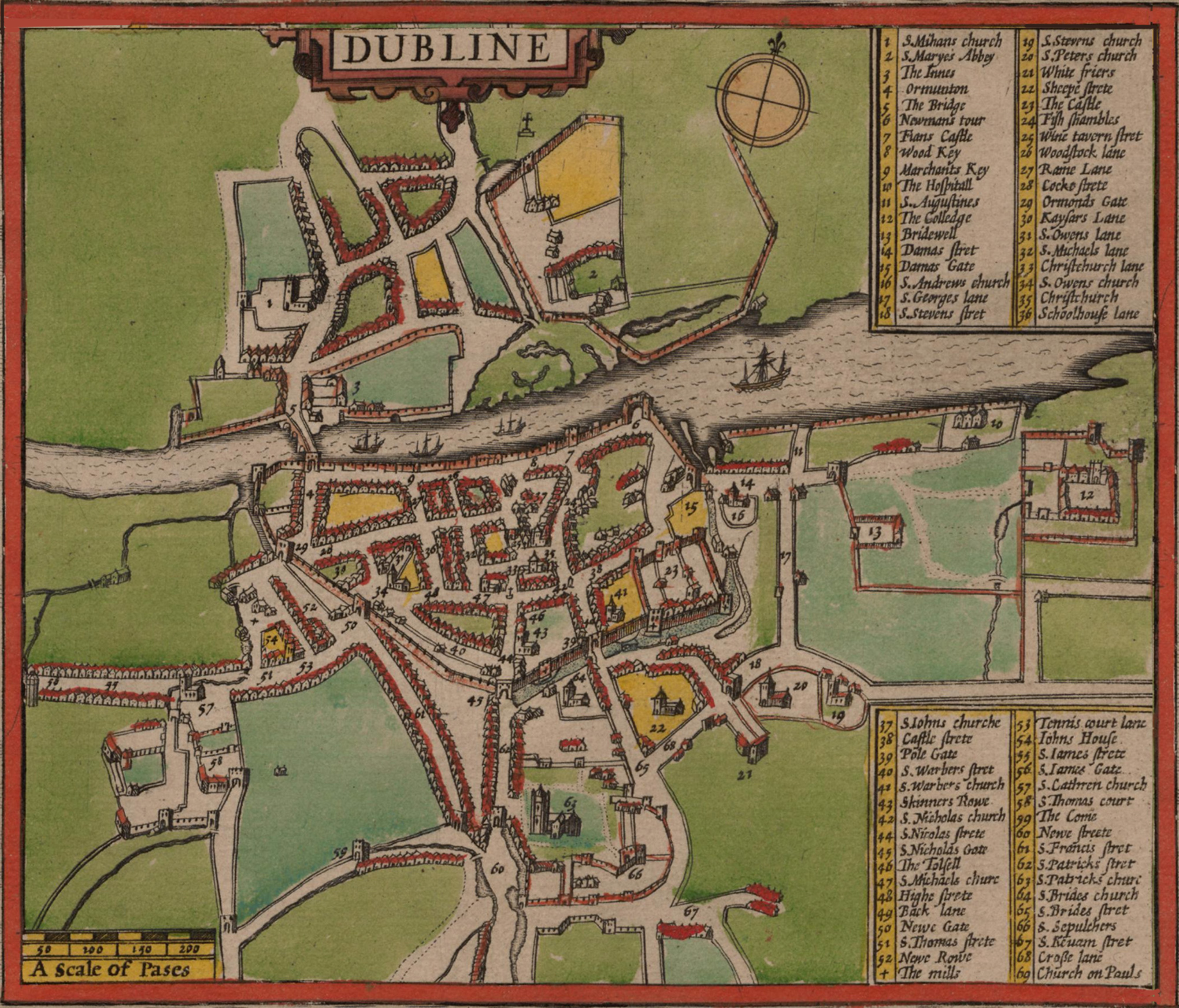
Map of Dublin in 1610 (reprint from 1896) showing St. Michan's Church (Top left #1)

Nearly five years later, on 11 June 2024, an intruder deliberately set fire to the crypt. The fire, and the water used to prevent it spreading to the wider church, left five mummified remains, including the Crusader, destroyed or damaged beyond repair. In February 2025, Cristian Topiter was sentenced to six years' imprisonment after pleading guilty to arson.

Before the 2024 fire, the crypt received approximately 30,000 visitors each year. As of March 2025, public access to the crypt had been suspended for about nine months while conservation work continued. Pierpoint said the closure was expected to cost between €75,000 and €100,000 in lost income.

== Organ ==
The church contains a historic pipe organ that combines an eighteenth-century case with a twentieth-century instrument. The ornate case was built between 1723 and 1725 by the French craftsman Jean-Baptiste Cuvilliés, while the present organ was built c.1940 by Evans and Barr of Belfast. The builders retained the historic case while fitting a three-manual pneumatic console into the space originally occupied by the church's narrower eighteenth-century keyboards.

Mounted on the front of the gallery is the Organ Trophy, a carved wooden panel depicting seventeen musical instruments that was installed in 1724. According to a long-standing local tradition, George Frideric Handel practised on the organ before the first performance of Messiah in Dublin in 1742. The earliest published account of the tradition, published in 1852, recorded that it had long been preserved in Dublin, although its accuracy could not be confirmed.

== Tourism ==
The church, especially its vault, has been a tourist destination in Dublin for many years. In 1890, the church was mentioned by M. J. B. Baddeley in a tourist guidebook to Ireland with the following note:

Hence, by turning N. up Church St., we should reach St. Michan's Church, the tower of which has the stepped battlements that are almost confined to Ireland. The vaults beneath the church have the property of preserving bodies from decay. Dr. Lucas, a "patriot", is buried here, and some say Robert Emmett, but this is doubtful. Irish kings, etc., are common, we are assured, and anyway it is an uncanny place.

== Gallery ==
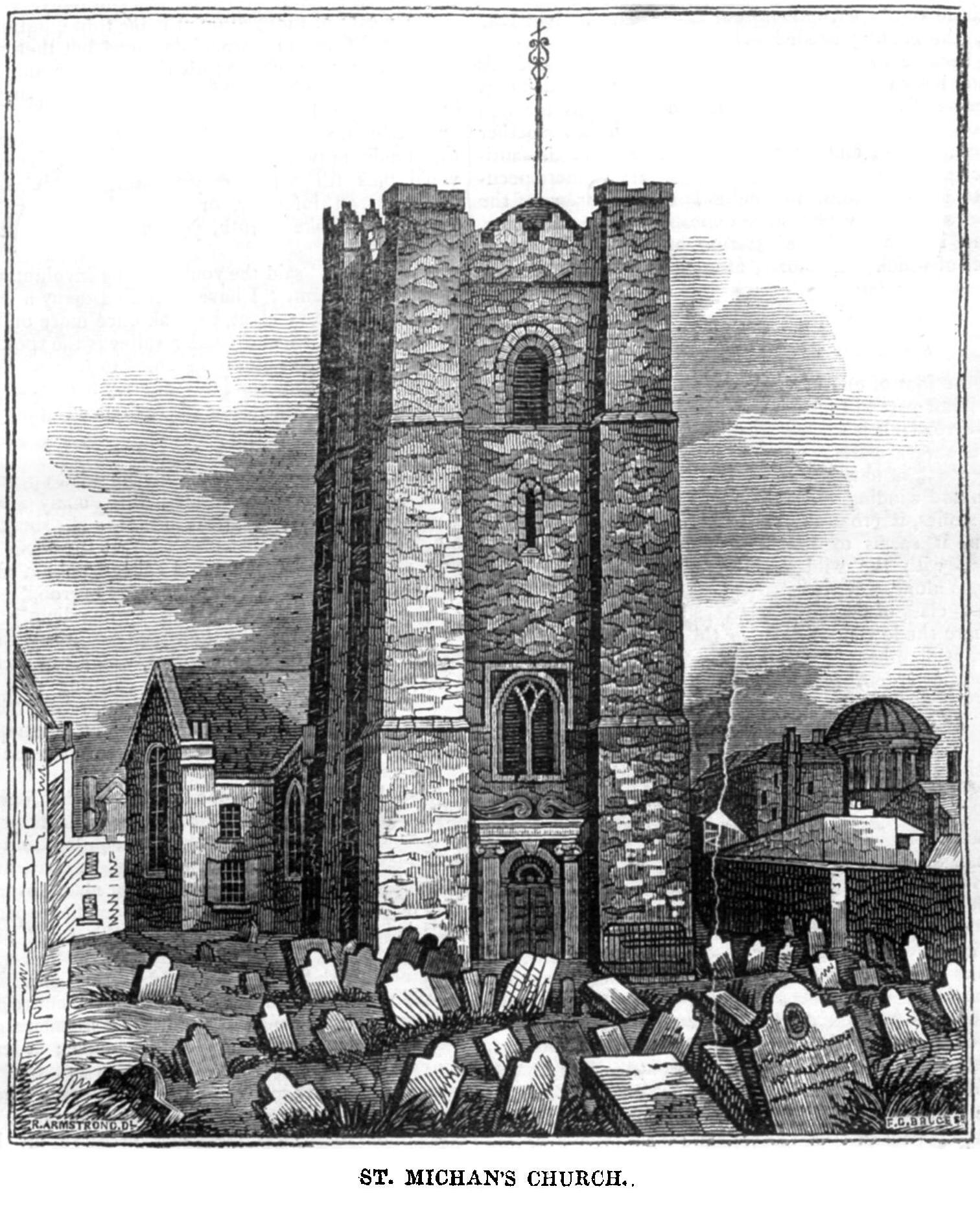
1833

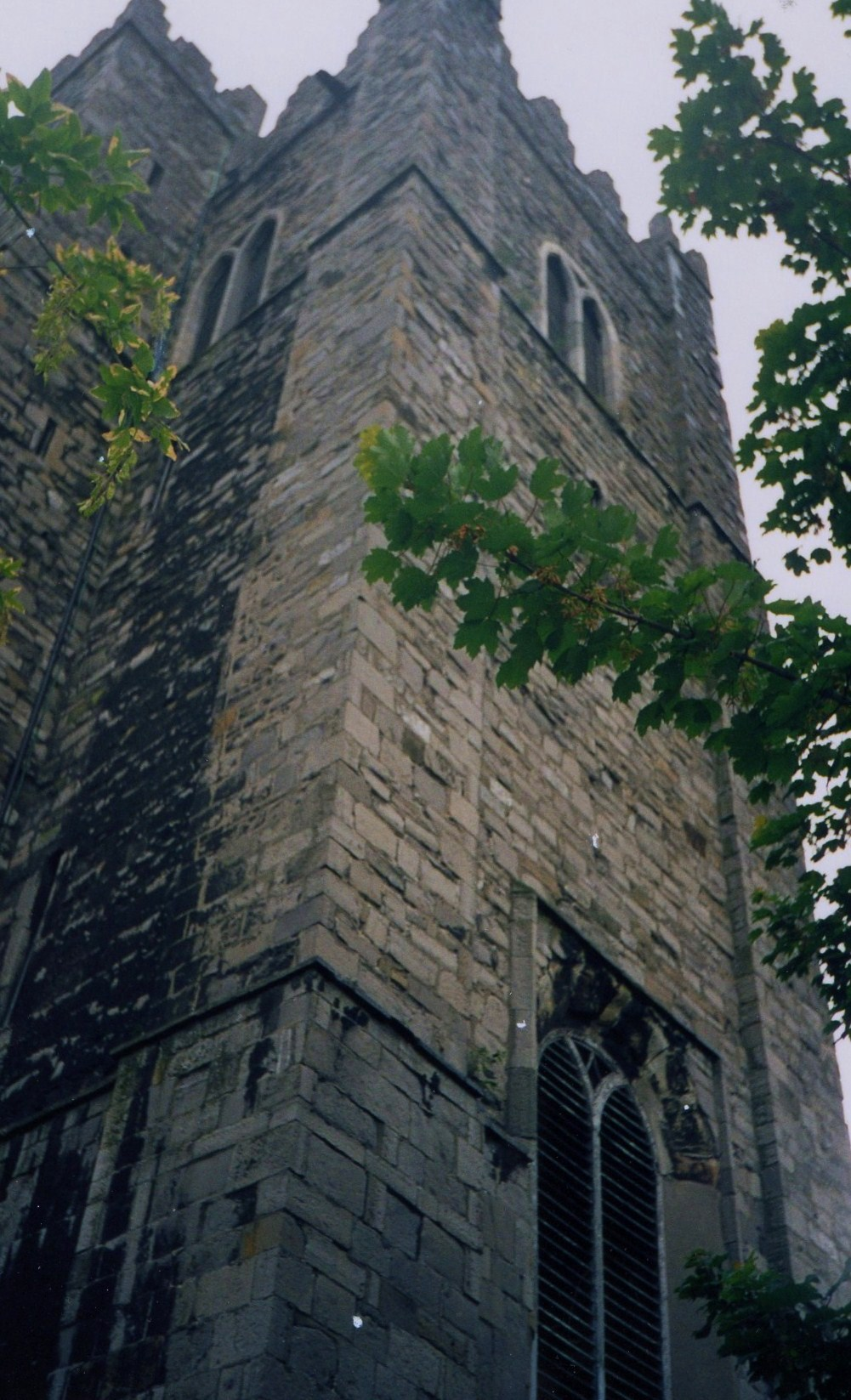
Spire

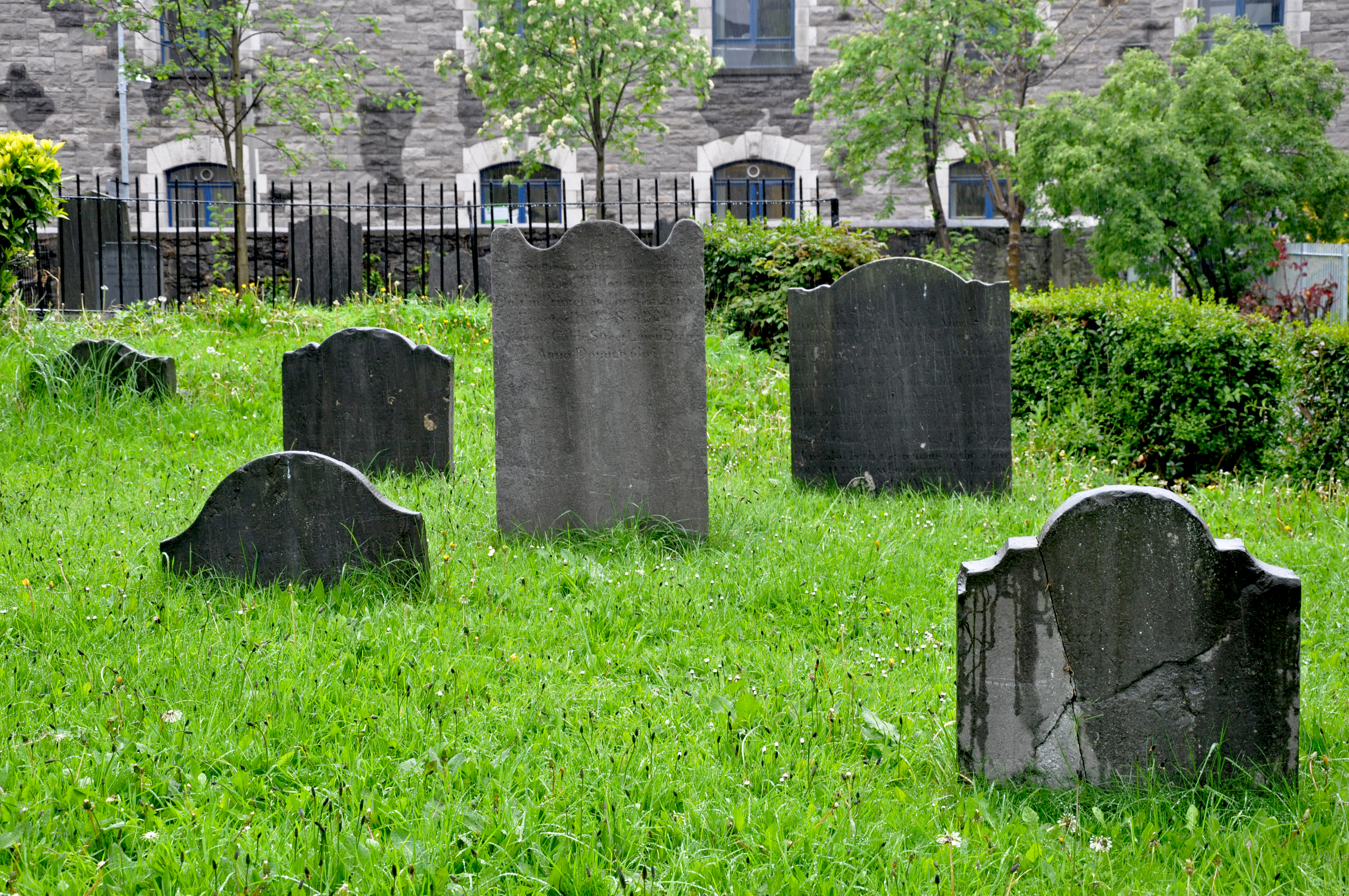
Churchyard to the rear of the church

== See also ==
- Richard Graves (1763–1829), a prebend at St. Michan's
