= Kildrought House =

- Teach Chill Droichid
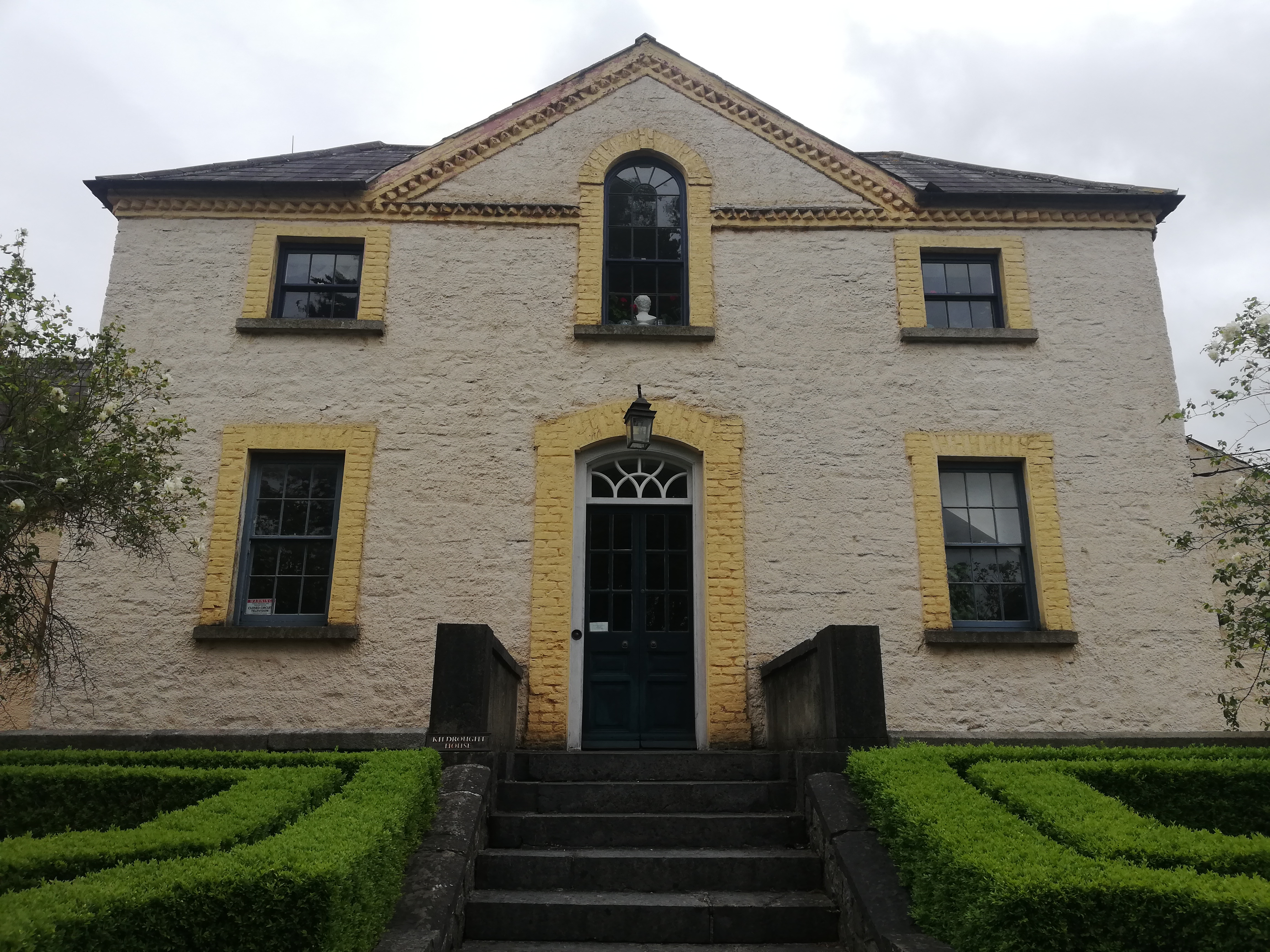
- Facade

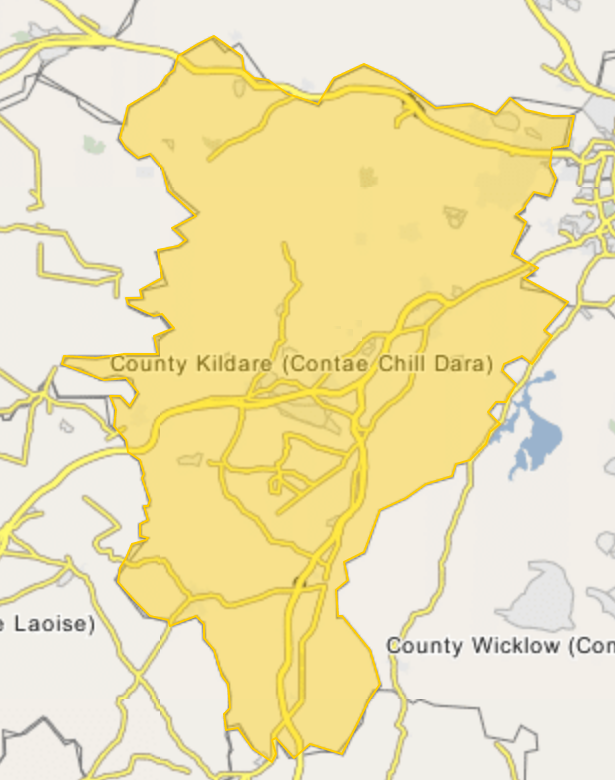
- Location within County Kildare
- Former names: Celbridge Academy
- Etymology: "Kildrought", former name of Celbridge

General information
- Status: Museum
- Type: House
- Architectural style: Georgian
- Location: Main Street, Celbridge, Ireland
- Coordinates: 53°20′25″N 6°32′15″W
- Elevation: 52 m (171 ft)
- Groundbreaking: 1719
- Renovated: 1985–95
- Owner: June Stuart

Technical details
- Material: stone, red clay, mortar, red brick, timber
- Floor count: 2 at front, 3 at rear

Design and construction
- Architect: Thomas Burgh

Renovating team
- Architect: Howley Hayes

Kildrought House is an early Georgian house and museum located in Celbridge, County Kildare, Ireland.

== Location ==
Kildrought House is located on Celbridge's main street, on the left bank of the River Liffey and 1.1 km southwest of Castletown House.

== History ==
Kildrought House was built in 1719–20 to the design of Thomas Burgh, for upholsterer and tapestry weaver Robert Baillie: his works depicting the Siege of Derry and the Battle of the Boyne still hang in the Irish House of Lords chamber. Baillie was a tenant of William Conolly.

From 1782 to 1814 it was John Begnall's Celbridge Academy, offering education to, among others, future bishop John Jebb and the sons of George Napier. It also served as a fever hospital (cholera), vicarage and dispensary at various times, and as an Irish Constabulary barracks from 1831 to 1841. After 1861 it was leased by Richard Maunsell of Oakley Park.

The interior was restored in 1985–95 by the owners, the Stuart family. In 2003, funding of over €12,500 was acquired from the Irish Georgian Society for restoration.

== Description ==
Kildrought House is a house of two storeys to the front elevation and three to the rear (including a basement). It is five bays wide with a central Palladian window. The building has lime-based, wet dash rendered walls. The roof is of slate tiles. There is a formal garden with brick summer house. A statue of brewer Arthur Guinness stands in the street outside.
