= Thomas Burgh (1670–1730) =

Anglo-Irish military engineer, architect and MP (1670–1730)

Colonel Thomas de Burgh
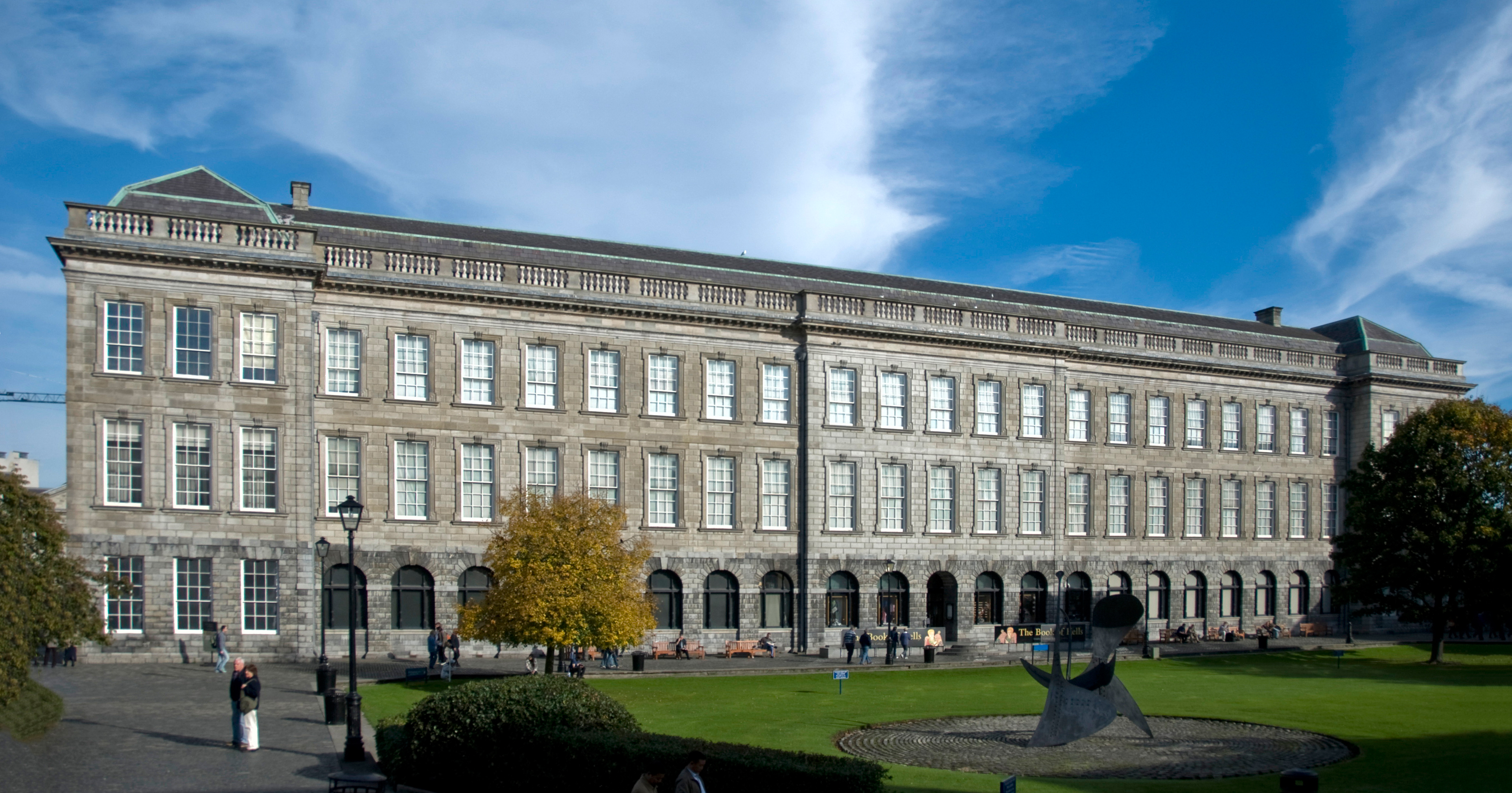
- The Old Library Building, Trinity College Dublin

Surveyor General of Ireland
- In office 1700–1730
- Preceded by: William Robinson; William Molyneux
- Succeeded by: Edward Lovett Pearce

Lieutenant-General of the Ordnance
- In office 1705–1713
- Preceded by: Chidley Coote
- Succeeded by: Richard Molesworth

Member of Parliament for Naas
- In office 1713–1730 Serving with Theobald Bourke
- Preceded by: Alexander Gradon; James Barry
- Succeeded by: Thomas Burgh; John Bourke

Personal details
- Born: Thomas Burgh; 1670
- Died: 18 December 1730 (aged 59–60)
- Spouse: Mary Smyth (m. 1700)
- Children: 9, including: Thomas Burgh; Richard Burgh
- Parent(s): Rt Rev Ulysses Burgh; Mary Kingsmill
- Relatives: Ulysses Burgh, 2nd Baron Downes (grandson)
- Education: Trinity College Dublin
- Military career
- Allegiance: United Kingdom
- Branch: British Army
- Service years: 1688–1730
- Rank: Lieutenant (1688); Captain (1692); Lieutenant-Colonel (1706); Colonel (1706)
- Unit: Lord Lovelace's Regiment of Foot
- Commands: Irish Engineers; Royal Regiment of Foot; Brasier's Regiment of Foot
- Conflicts: Siege of Limerick (1690); Battle of Steenkerke (1692); Battle of Landen (1693); Siege of Namur (1695)

Colonel Thomas de Burgh (English: /dəˈbɜːr/ də-BUR; 1670 – 18 December 1730), always named in his lifetime as Thomas Burgh, was an Anglo-Irish military engineer, architect, and Member of the Parliament of Ireland who served as Surveyor General of Ireland (1700–1730) and designed a number of the large public buildings of Dublin including the old Custom House (1704–6), Trinity College Library (1712–33), Dr Steevens' Hospital (1719), the Linen Hall (1722), and the Royal Barracks (1701 onwards).

== Early life ==
Thomas Burgh was the son of Rt Rev Ulysses Burgh (d. 1692) of Drumkeen, County Limerick, who was Dean of Emly and later Bishop of Ardagh. His mother was Mary, daughter of William Kingsmill of Ballibeg, County Cork. His brothers, Richard Burgh of Dromkeen and Drumrusk and William Burgh of Bert House, Athy, were both Members of the Irish Parliament.

Thomas was educated at Delany's school in Dublin, and Trinity College Dublin, where he matriculated on 22 November 1685 and left without taking a degree. Prior to the outbreak of the 1688 wars he is likely to have left Ireland for London with his father. He returned to Ireland in the army of King William III, as a lieutenant in Lord Lovelace's Regiment of Foot, and served at the Siege of Limerick. This may have been followed by a brief spell in the Irish Engineers from 1691. In any case, de Burgh was commissioned as a captain in 1692 in the Royal Regiment of Foot. In this capacity, he served in the Low Countries at the Battles of Steenkerke (1692) and Landen (1693), and as an engineer at the siege of Namur (1695). During this time, he absorbed the ideas of the Dutch engineer Menno van Coehoorn (1641–1740). In 1697, he became Third Engineer on the Irish establishment.

In 1700, Burgh replaced the Surveyor General of Ireland, William Robinson, and, one year later, also became Barracks Overseer in Ireland. Under his command, the building of barracks was expanded and the rebuilding of Dublin Castle (begun under Robinson) was completed. Chapelizod House and Chichester House in Dublin were repaired as well as numerous coastal fortifications.

As well as a Colonel of the Engineers (Lieutenant-Colonel, 11 April 1706), Burgh held a Captain's commission in Brasier's Regiment of Foot from 1707 to 1714.

== Public life ==
In 1704, Burgh was admitted as a freeman of the City of Dublin in recognition of his work in enriching Dublin's architecture. He was later admitted to the Dublin Philosophical Society. He served as Member of Parliament for Naas from 1713 to 1730 and as a government minister. He was appointed High Sheriff of Kildare in 1712, Governor of the Royal Hospital Kilmainham in 1707 and served as a Trustee of Dr Steevens' Hospital from 1717 to 1730.

From 1705 to 1714, he was Lieutenant-General of the Ordnance for Ireland, an appointment which (held with that of Surveyor General) made him the most influential officer in the Irish Board of Ordnance. In this role, he was responsible for overseeing the construction and renovation of all military buildings in Ireland as well as other public works. De Burgh had his commission successively renewed over the 27 years following his appointment as Surveyor General in 1700.

== Architect ==
De Burgh was responsible for the design of several public buildings in Dublin:

- The Custom House (1704–6), (superseded by James Gandon's Custom House in 1791 further downriver)
- Trinity College Library (1712–33) and Anatomy House (1711–12), both on the campus of Trinity College
- Dr Steevens' Hospital (1719–33)
- Linen Hall (1722)
- Royal Barracks (1701 onwards)
- The Armoury, Dublin Castle
- Chapelizod House
- St. Luke's Church, Dublin
- Collegiate School Celbridge
- Ballyburley House

Burgh was also responsible for the building of several churches, including St Mary's Church in Dublin 1 (now a Popular Café Bar and Restaurant) and St Werburgh's (1715). He is known to have built a number of private houses, most of which no longer exist, including the O'Brien family house at Dromoland, County Clare, in about 1719.

His own country house at Oldtown near Naas, County Kildare, was the only building into which he introduced Palladian ideas. He acquired the land in 1696 and the house was built thirteen years later. His architectural style was otherwise "restrained" and notable mainly for massing on different planes, using a central five-bay front crowned by a large pediment, and arcading on the ground floor. Oldtown remained the family home, although a fire destroyed the original main house and a wing in the 1950s. He also designed Kildrought House in nearby Celbridge.

He worked on several engineering projects, including improvements to Dublin Harbour and the proposed Newry Canal, although this was not built until after his death. Burgh published a pamphlet entitled "A method to determine the areas of right-lined figures universally, very useful for ascertaining the contents of any survey" (Dublin, 1724).

In 1728 Burgh lost the commission to build the new Parliament House in Dublin to Edward Lovett Pearce (1699–1733), who succeeded de Burgh as Surveyor General on his death, after an illness, in 1730.

== Family ==
Burgh was married to Mary, a daughter of Rt Rev William Smyth, Bishop of Kilmore, on 10 July 1700. They had five sons and four daughters. His townhouse was in Dawson Street (now rebuilt) and his country estate was at Oldtown in County Kildare. He also owned lucrative collieries in County Antrim.

Their children were:

- Thomas Burgh (1707–1759), succeeded his father as MP for Naas
- Colonel Theobald Burgh (b. 1709)
- Ulysses Burgh (died 1742)
- Rev John Burgh (died 1767), vicar of Donaghmore, County Monaghan
- Richard Burgh (died 1762), a barrister of Drumkeen, County Limerick, succeeded his brother as MP for Naas; he left much of his property to his sister Elizabeth's son Walter Hussey, who took the name Walter Hussey Burgh
- Mary, who married a cousin, also named Thomas Burgh
- Dorothea, who married as his second wife Rt Hon Anthony Foster (1705–1779), Chief Baron of the Irish Exchequer in 1749
- Catherine (died 1797), who married Rev John Alcock, Dean of Ferns
- Elizabeth (1705–1757), who married Ignatius Hussey, and was mother of the Rt Hon Walter Hussey Burgh MP PC (1742–1783), Chief Baron of the Irish Exchequer, a leading member of the Irish Patriot Party and a noted orator.

== Surname ==
In 1848, Thomas Burgh's grandson Ulysses Burgh, 2nd Baron Downes was allowed to change the family surname to "de Burgh" by Royal Licence.

== See also ==
- House of Burgh, an Anglo-Norman and Hiberno-Norman dynasty founded in 1193
- de Burgh, surname

== Gallery ==
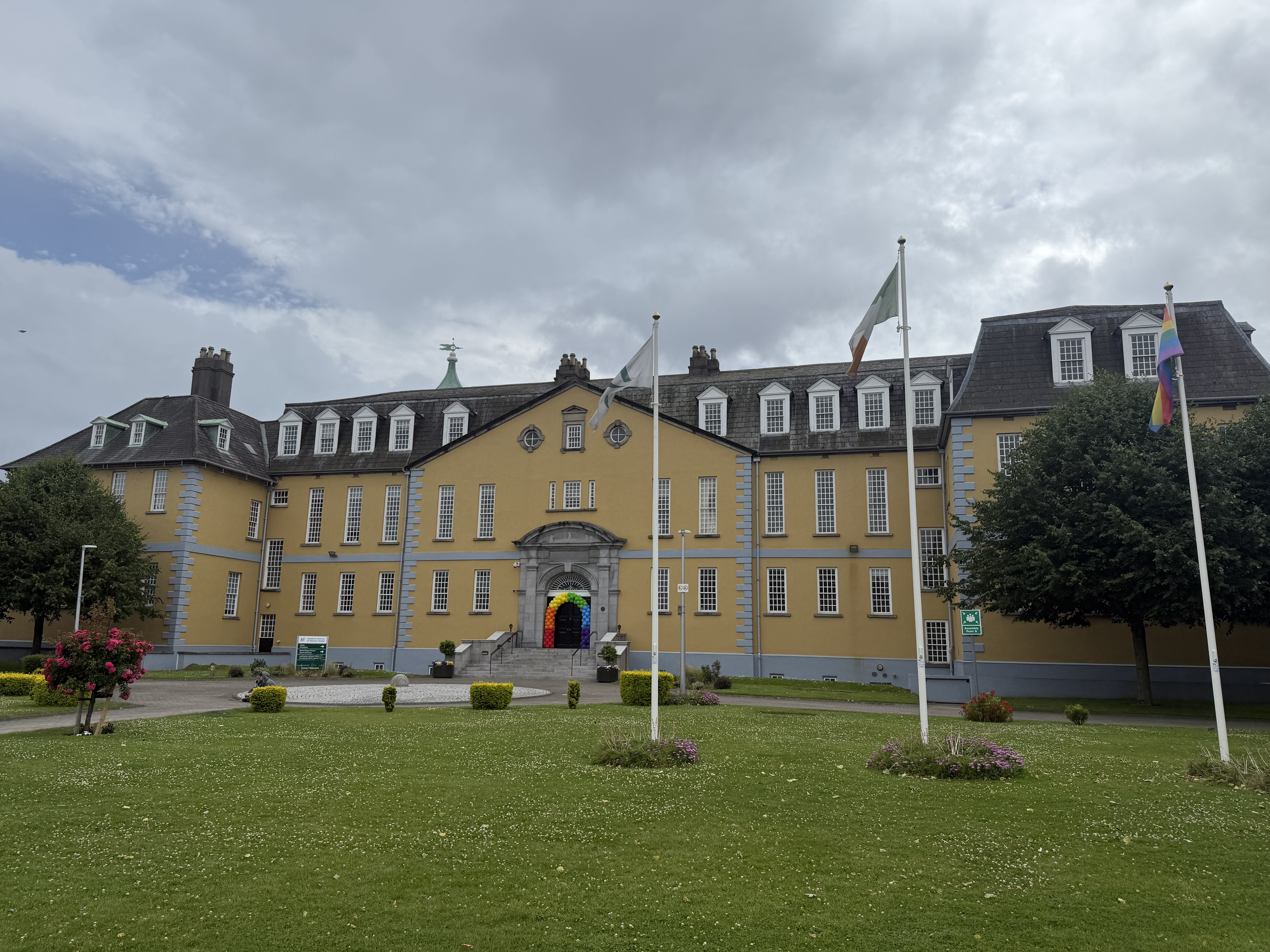
Dr Steevens' Hospital, Dublin

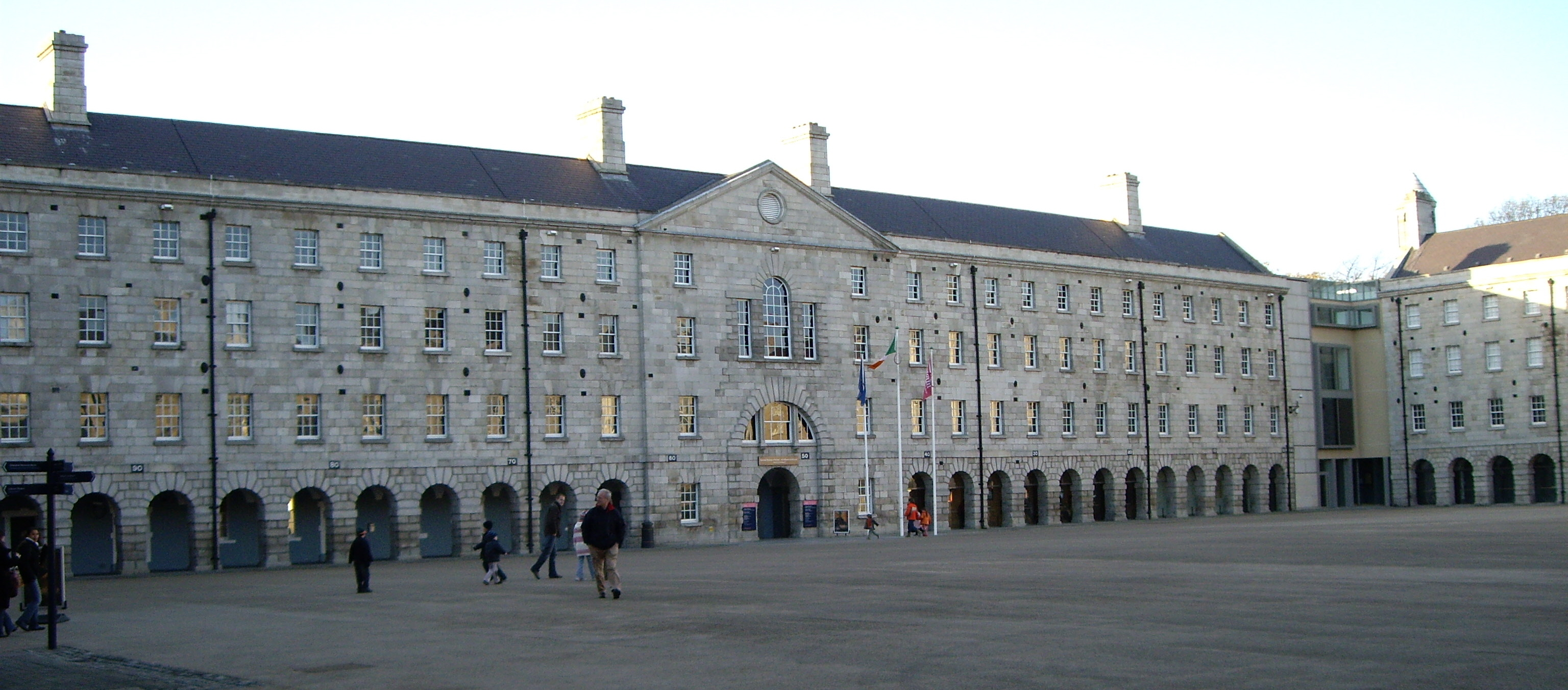
Main Square of the (Royal) Collins Barracks, Dublin

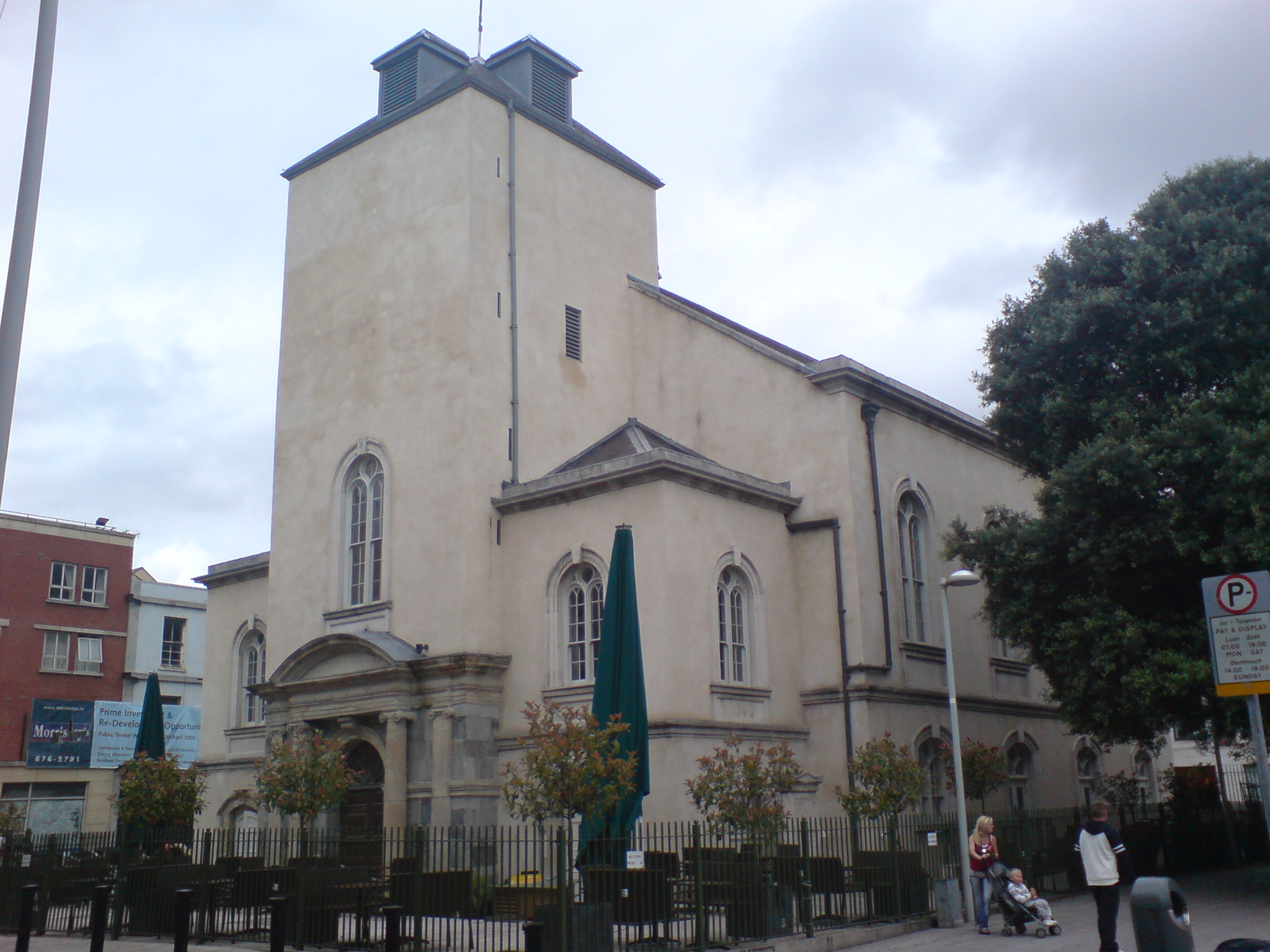
St Mary's Church, Mary Street, Dublin

Kildrought House, Celbridge, Ireland

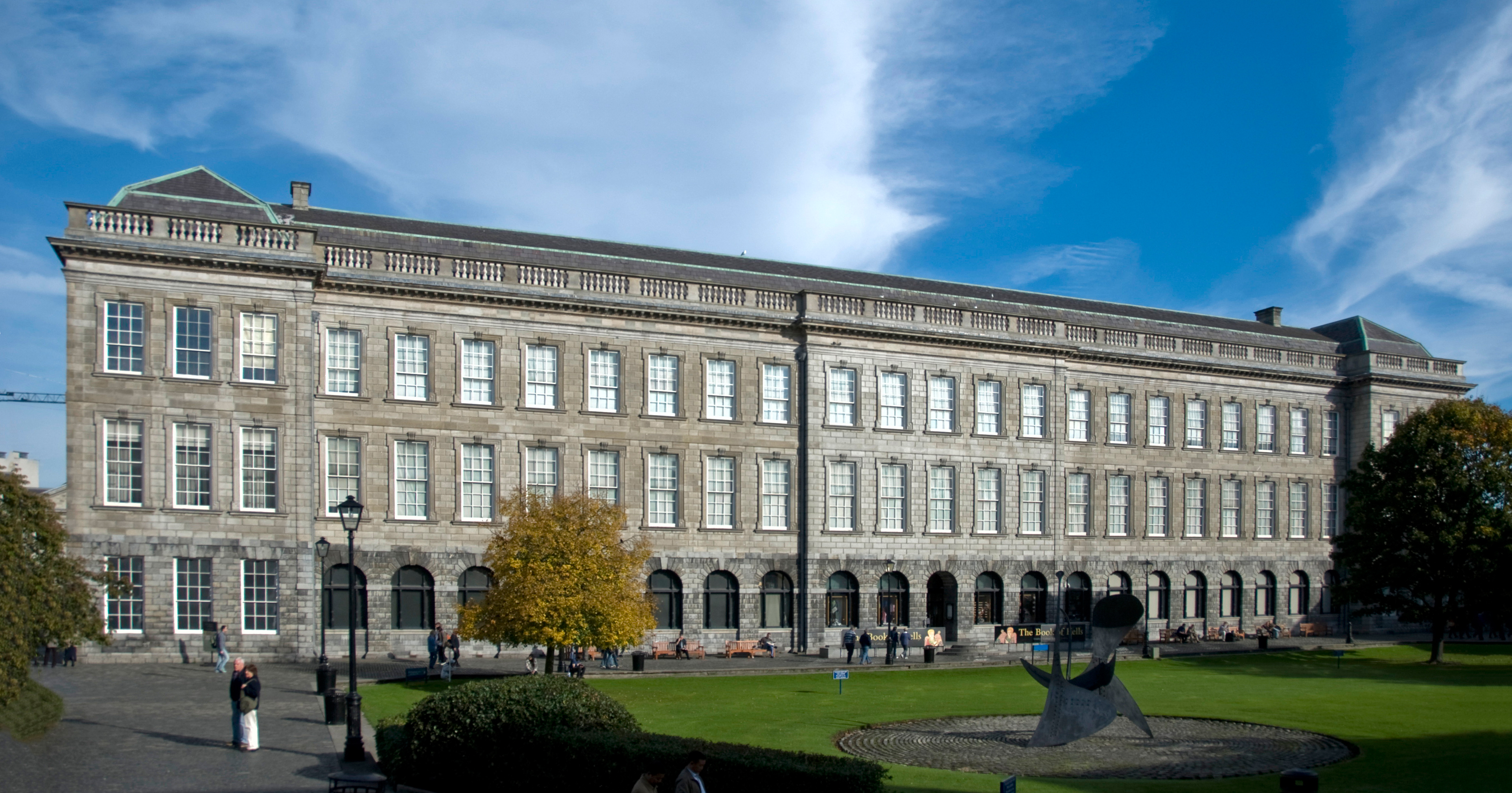
Old Library Building, Trinity College Dublin

A view of the Linenhall, Dublin from around 1782 by the engraver Robert Pollard

Parliament of Ireland
Preceded by Alexander Gradon; James Barry	Member of Parliament for Naas; 1713–1730; With: Theobald Bourke	Succeeded by Thomas Burgh; John Bourke
Honorary titles
Preceded by Sir Kildare Borrowes	High Sheriff of Kildare; 1712–14	Succeeded by Brabazon Ponsonby
Political offices
Preceded by William Robinson; William Molyneux	Surveyor General of Ireland; 1700–1730	Succeeded by Edward Lovett Pearce
Preceded by Chidley Coote	Lieutenant-General of the Ordnance; 1705–1713	Succeeded by Richard Molesworth
