= Chapelizod House =

Demolished late-medieval Viceregal residence in Dublin, Ireland

Chapelizod House, known as the Viceregal Lodge, was a late medieval residence in Chapelizod, at the time a village outside Dublin (but now a suburb) which in the 1680s was used as a temporary residence for the Lord Lieutenant of Ireland following a fire which had destroyed the Viceregal Apartments in Dublin Castle.

In the 1660s, the house was taxed for thirteen hearths and in the 1730s it was described as a plain brick house. The house was still in use by dignitaries up to the 1750s.

The viceregal couple later returned to live in Dublin Castle, after the Viceregal Apartments had been rebuilt.

The precise location of Chapelizod House, which has long since been demolished, are not recorded in detail.

The importance of the building is noted by the fact that Thomas Burgh, Surveyor General of Ireland, is recorded as having carried out works on the house in 1709.

In 1729-30, Charles and Elizabeth Delafaye are recorded as being keepers of the Royal house at Chapelizod.

== Áras an Uachtaráin ==
A later building, now known as Áras an Uachtaráin, the official residence of the President of Ireland, later became more associated with the name Viceregal Lodge, a name that it used from 1781 to 1938.
