= Jocelyn (surname) =

Jocelyn is a surname, and may refer to:

- Alfredo Jocelyn-Holt, Chilean writer and historian
- Ann Henning Jocelyn (born 1948), Swedish playwright, translator and author
- Daniel Jocelyn (born 1970), New Zealand equestrian
- Frances Jocelyn, Viscountess Jocelyn, British photographer
- Harry Jocelyn (1933–2000), Australian Latinist and classical scholar
- John Strange Jocelyn, 5th Earl of Roden (1823–1897), Anglo-Irish soldier and representative peer
- Marthe Jocelyn (born 1956), Canadian writer of children's books
- Matthew Jocelyn (born 1958), Canadian theatre director
- Mervyn Jocelyn (born 1991), Mauritian footballer
- Nathaniel Jocelyn (1796–1881), American painter and engraver
- Percy Jocelyn (1764–1843), Church of Ireland bishop
- Robert Jocelyn, 1st Viscount Jocelyn (c.1688–1756), Anglo-Irish politician and judge
- Robert Jocelyn, 1st Earl of Roden (bapt. 1731–1797), Irish politician, son of the 1st Viscount Jocelyn
- Robert Jocelyn, 2nd Earl of Roden (1756–1820), Irish soldier and politician
- Robert Jocelyn, 3rd Earl of Roden (1788–1870), Irish politician
- Robert Jocelyn, 4th Earl of Roden (1846–1880), Anglo-Irish politician
- Robert Jocelyn, Viscount Jocelyn (1816–1854), British soldier and politician
- Simeon Jocelyn (1799–1879), American minister, abolitionist and activist
- Stephen Perry Jocelyn (1843–1920), United States Army officer
- Tomás Jocelyn-Holt (born 1963), Chilean politician

== See also ==
- Josselyn
