= Robert Jocelyn =

Robert Jocelyn may refer to:

- Robert Jocelyn, 1st Viscount Jocelyn (1688–1756), 1st Lord Newport (I), lord chancellor of Ireland
- Robert Jocelyn, 1st Earl of Roden (1731–1791), 2nd Viscount Jocelyn, 2nd Lord Newport and 5th baronet, Irish politician
- Robert Jocelyn, 2nd Earl of Roden (1756–1820), Irish politician
- Robert Jocelyn, 3rd Earl of Roden (1788–1870), 4th Viscount Jocelyn, 4th Lord Newport, 1st Lord Clanbrassil (UK) and 7th baronet, Irish politician
- Robert Jocelyn, Viscount Jocelyn (1816–1854), British politician and soldier who died before his father
- Robert Jocelyn, 4th Earl of Roden (1846–1880), British politician
