= Earl of Roden =

Title in the Peerage of Ireland

Earldom of Roden
- Blazon: Arms: Azure, a circular Wreath Argent and Sable, with four Hawk’s Bells conjoined thereto in quadrangle Or. Crest: A Falcon’s Leg erased à-la-cuisse proper, belled Or. Supporters: On either side a Falcon wings inverted proper, belled Or.
- Creation date: 1 December 1771
- Created by: George III
- Peerage: Peerage of Ireland
- First holder: Robert Jocelyn, 2nd Viscount Jocelyn
- Present holder: Robert Jocelyn, 10th Earl of Roden
- Heir apparent: Shane Jocelyn, Viscount Jocelyn
- Remainder to: The 1st Earl's heirs male of the body lawfully begotten
- Subsidiary titles: Viscount Jocelyn; Baron Newport; Baron Clanbrassil; Baronet 'of Hyde Hall'
- Status: Extant
- Former seats: Hyde Hall; Tollymore Park (also known as Bryansford House)
- Motto: Faire mon devoir (Do my duty)

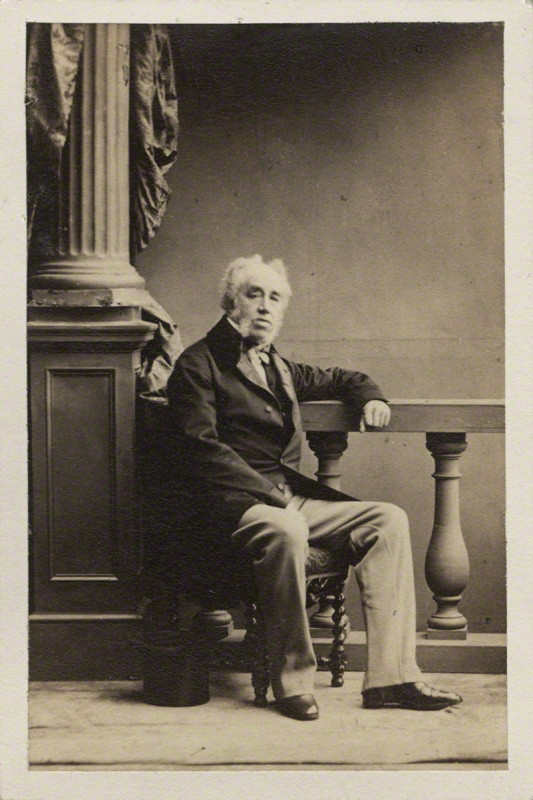
Robert Jocelyn, 3rd Earl of Roden.

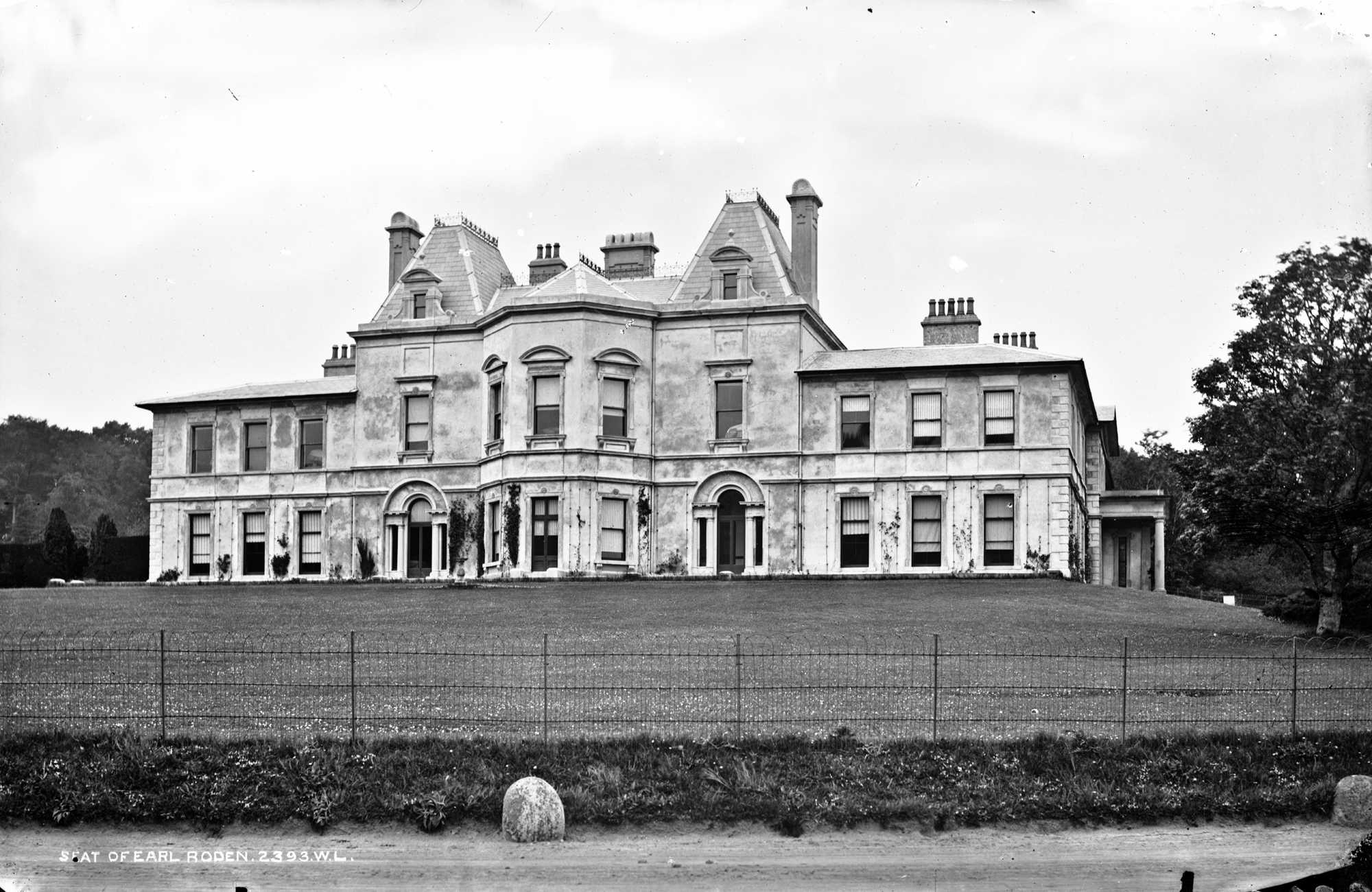
Bryansford House, better known as Tollymore Park, in County Down (demolished 1952)

Earl of Roden is a title in the Peerage of Ireland. It was created in 1771 for Robert Jocelyn, 2nd Viscount Jocelyn. This branch of the Jocelyn family descends from the 1st Viscount, prominent Irish lawyer and politician Robert Jocelyn, the son of Thomas Jocelyn, third son of Sir Robert Jocelyn, 1st Baronet, of Hyde Hall (see below). He notably served as the Lord Chancellor of Ireland from 1739 to 1756. In 1743, he was raised to the Peerage of Ireland as Baron Newport, of Newport, and in 1755 he was further honoured, when he was made Viscount Jocelyn, also in the Peerage of Ireland. He was succeeded by his son, the second Viscount. He represented Old Leighlin in the Irish House of Commons and served as Auditor-General of Ireland. In 1770 he also succeeded his first cousin once removed as fifth Baronet of Hyde Hall. In 1771 he was created Earl of Roden, of High Roding in the County of Tipperary, in the Peerage of Ireland. Lord Roden married Lady Anne Hamilton, daughter of James Hamilton, 1st Earl of Clanbrassil and sister of James Hamilton, 2nd Earl of Clanbrassil, a title which became extinct in 1798.

Lord Roden was succeeded by his son, the second Earl. He sat in the Irish House of Commons for Dundalk, and served as an Irish representative peer in the British House of Lords between 1800 and 1820. He was also a professional soldier who played a decisive if somewhat ruthless role in suppressing the Irish Rebellion of 1798. His son, the third Earl, represented County Louth in the British House of Commons and was Auditor-General of the Exchequer in Ireland. In 1821 he was created Baron Clanbrassil, of Hyde Hall in the County of Hertford and Dundalk in the County of Louth, in the Peerage of the United Kingdom, which gave him and his descendants an automatic seat in the House of Lords. This was a revival of the Clanbrassil title held by his ancestors the Earls of Clanbrassil. Lord Roden was a leading figure in the Protestant Second Reformation. His grandson, the fourth Earl, Viscount Jocelyn's son, served in the second Conservative administration of Benjamin Disraeli as a Lord-in-Waiting (government whip in the House of Lords) from 1874 to 1880.

He died at an early age and was succeeded by his uncle, the fifth Earl. When he died in 1897, the barony of Clanbrassil became extinct. He was succeeded in the Irish titles by his first cousin, the sixth Earl. He was the son of the Hon. John Jocelyn, fourth son of the second Earl. On his death, the titles were inherited by his younger brother Robert, the seventh Earl. Robert married the writer Ada Maria Jenyns. Their son, also named Robert, the eighth Earl, sat in the House of Lords as an Irish representative peer between 1919 and 1956. As of 2014 the titles are held by his grandson, the tenth Earl, who succeeded his father in 1993.

The Jocelyn Baronetcy, of Hyde Hall in the County of Hertford, was created in the Baronetage of England in 1665 for Robert Jocelyn. He was succeeded by his eldest son, the second Baronet. This line of the family failed on the death of his younger son, the fourth Baronet, in 1778. The late Baronet was succeeded by his first cousin once removed, the first Earl of Roden.

The family seat was Hyde Hall, near Sawbridgeworth, Hertfordshire, and Tollymore Park, near Bryansford, County Down.

The Earls of Roden were associated with the County Louth town of Dundalk for over three centuries; in July 2006 the freehold of the town was sold by auction.

== Viscounts Jocelyn (1755) ==
- Robert Jocelyn, 1st Viscount Jocelyn (1688–1756)
- Robert Jocelyn, 2nd Viscount Jocelyn (1731–1797) (created Earl of Roden in 1771)

== Earls of Roden (1771) ==
- Robert Jocelyn, 1st Earl of Roden (1731–1797)
- Robert Jocelyn, 2nd Earl of Roden (1756–1820)
- Robert Jocelyn, 3rd Earl of Roden (1788–1870)
- Robert Jocelyn, 4th Earl of Roden (1846–1880)
- John Strange Jocelyn, 5th Earl of Roden (1823–1897)
- William Henry Jocelyn, 6th Earl of Roden (1842–1910)
- Robert Julian Orde Jocelyn, 7th Earl of Roden (1845–1915)
- Robert Soame Jocelyn, 8th Earl of Roden (1883–1956)
- Robert William Jocelyn, 9th Earl of Roden (1909–1993)
- Robert John Jocelyn, 10th Earl of Roden (born 1938)

== Present peer ==
Robert John Jocelyn, 10th Earl of Roden (born 25 August 1938) is the son of the 9th Earl and his wife Clodagh Rose Kennedy. Until 1993 he was known as Viscount Jocelyn.

In 2005 he published Tollymore : the story of an Irish demesne, about his childhood and the family connection to their former estate in County Down, Northern Ireland. Tollymore Park House was demolished in 1952 and the estate is now maintained as Tollymore Forest Park.

On 10 June 1970, he married Sara Cecilia Dunlop. They were divorced in 1982, and on 13 February 1986 he married Ann Henning. With his first wife he has one daughter; with his second wife he has one son, the heir apparent, Shane Robert Henning Jocelyn, Viscount Jocelyn (born 1989).

In 1993 he succeeded as Earl of Roden, Viscount Jocelyn, and Baron Newport, and also became the 14th Jocelyn baronet (created in 1665) in 1993.

In 2003 Roden was living at Doon House, Cashel, County Galway, Ireland.

In 2006 he sold the Roden estate's remaining interests in the town of Dundalk, mainly freeholds and ground rents.

== Jocelyn Baronets, of Hyde Hall (1665) ==
- Sir Robert Jocelyn, 1st Baronet (1623–1712)
- Sir Strange Jocelyn, 2nd Baronet (c. 1651–1734)
- Sir John Jocelyn, 3rd Baronet (1689–1741)
- Sir Conyers Jocelyn, 4th Baronet (1703–1778)
- Robert Jocelyn, 1st Earl of Roden, 5th Baronet (1731–1797)

see above for further holders

=== Line of succession ===
Line of succession
- William Jocelyn, 9th Earl of Roden (1909–1993)
  - Robert Jocelyn, 10th Earl of Roden (born 1938)
    - (1). Shane Robert Henning Jocelyn, Viscount Jocelyn (born 1989)
  - Hon. Thomas Allan Jocelyn (1941–missing, lost at sea 1991)
    - (2). Charles Patrick Jocelyn (born 1978)
      - (3). James Rudland Georges Jocelyn (born 2009)
      - (4). Theo Claude Thomas Jocelyn (born 2011)

== See also ==
- Earl of Clanbrassil
- Percy Jocelyn (1764–1843), Bishop of Clogher in the Church of Ireland
- Frances Jocelyn, Viscountess Jocelyn (1820–1880)
