= Countess Cowper =

Countess Cowper is a title given to the wife of Earl Cowper, a title in the Peerage of Great Britain. Women who have held the title include:

- Mary Cowper (née Clavering; 1685–1724) (wife of the 1st Earl Cowper)
- Emily Temple, Viscountess Palmerston (née Lamb; 1787–1869) (wife of 5th Earl Cowper)
