= Countess of Shaftesbury =

Countess of Shaftesbury is a title given to the wife of the Earl of Shaftesbury. Women who have held the title include:

- Dorothy Ashley-Cooper, Countess of Shaftesbury (c.1656–1698)
- Emily Ashley-Cooper, Countess of Shaftesbury (1810–1872), wife of Anthony Ashley-Cooper, 7th Earl of Shaftesbury
- Constance Ashley-Cooper, Countess of Shaftesbury (1875–1957), wife of Anthony Ashley-Cooper, 9th Earl of Shaftesbury
- Jamila M'Barek (born c.1961), widow of Anthony Ashley-Cooper, 10th Earl of Shaftesbury
