= Custos Rotulorum of Louth =

The Custos Rotulorum of Louth was the highest civil officer in County Louth.

== Incumbents ==
- 1656–?1675: Henry Moore, 1st Earl of Drogheda (died 1675)
- ?1675–?1679 : ?Charles Moore, 2nd Earl of Drogheda (died 1679)
- 1679–? : Henry Hamilton-Moore, 3rd Earl of Drogheda (died 1714)
- 1769–1798: James Hamilton, 2nd Earl of Clanbrassill
- 1798–1800: John Foster
- 1800–1820: Robert Jocelyn, 2nd Earl of Roden
- 1820–1849: Robert Jocelyn, 3rd Earl of Roden

For later custodes rotulorum, see Lord Lieutenant of Louth
