= Cashel =

Cashel (an Anglicised form of the Irish language word Caiseal, meaning "stone fort") may refer to:

== Places in Ireland ==
- Cashel, County Tipperary
  - The Rock of Cashel, an ancient, hilltop fortress complex for which Cashel is named
  - Archbishop of Cashel
  - Cashel (Parliament of Ireland constituency), before 1800
  - Cashel (UK Parliament constituency) (1801–70)
  - Dean of Cashel
- Cashel, County Galway, a coastal village
- An Caiseal (or Cashel), a village on Achill island, Co. Mayo
- A past name for Collooney, a town in County Sligo

== Places in Canada ==
- Cashel, Ontario: neighbourhood in Markham
- Tudor and Cashel: township in Hastings County, Ontario

== Places elsewhere ==
- Cashel Township, Swift County, Minnesota, United States
- Cashel, Zimbabwe

== People ==
- Ernest Cashel (1882–1904), American-born outlaw who became famous in Canada for his repeated escapes from custody
- Cashel Man, a bog body from the Cúl na Móna bog near Cashel in County Laois, Ireland

== See also ==
- Caiseal (disambiguation)
