= Josselyn =

Josselyn is a surname, and may refer to:

- George Josselyn (1807–1888), English solicitor and politician
- Henry Josselyn (died c. 1683), settler in New England
- John Josselyn (fl.1638–1675), English travel writer
- John Josselyn (MP) (c.1490–1553/4), English politician
- Ralph Josselyn (died 1478), English politician
- Randy Josselyn (born 1974), American actor
- Sheena Josselyn, Canadian neuroscientist
- Simeon T. Josselyn (1842–1905), Union Army officer who was awarded the Medal of Honor

== See also ==
- Jocelyn (surname)
