= John Strange Jocelyn, 5th Earl of Roden =

Anglo-Irish soldier & peer (1823-1897)

The Right Honourable The Earl of Roden
- Born: 5 June 1823; Tollymore Park House, Bryansford, County Down, Ireland
- Died: 3 July 1897 (aged 74); London, England
- Education: Harrow School
- Occupations: Soldier, representative peer
- Spouse: Sophia Hobhouse (m. 1851)
- Children: Lady Violet Jocelyn
- Awards: Legion of Honour; Order of the Medjidie

John Strange Jocelyn, 5th Earl of Roden (5 June 1823 – 3 July 1897), was an Anglo-Irish soldier and representative peer. He was the son of Robert Jocelyn, 3rd Earl of Roden, and inherited the title after the death of his nephew Robert Jocelyn, 4th Earl of Roden, in 1880.

== Early life and education ==
Lord Roden was born at Tollymore Park House in Bryansford, County Down.

Jocelyn was educated at Harrow. A lieutenant colonel in the Scots Guards, Jocelyn served in the Crimean War, being present at the battles of Alma, Balaclava, and Inkerman. He later commanded the 2nd Jäger Corps, British German Legion. He received the French Legion of Honour and the Turkish Order of the Medjidie. He held the office of Deputy Lieutenant of County Down.

== Career ==
He sat in the House of Lords as Baron Clanbrassil, a title his father had obtained in 1821, from 1880 until his death, although he made no contributions there. At his death the title of Baron Clanbrassil became extinct, and the Roden earldom passed to his half-first cousin William Henry Jocelyn (1842-1910), a grandson of the 2nd Earl and his second wife.

The Jocelyns were large landowners, principally in County Down and County Louth.

== Personal life ==
Jocelyn married Sophia Hobhouse (1832-1916) in 1851; they had one daughter:

- Lady Violet Jocelyn (1858-1925); married Reginald Proctor-Beauchamp (1853-1912) in 1880. They had two daughters. In 1896 her husband filed for divorce, naming Hugh Watt, a former Member of Parliament for Glasgow, as a co-respondent; the divorce was granted in 1901 and Proctor-Beauchamp was awarded ten thousand pounds in a suit against Watt for criminal conversation. Watt's wife also divorced him. After his wife refused for many years to finalize the divorce, Watt was convicted of plotting to murder her in 1905. He was released after a year amid public sentiment that the conviction was based on false testimony. The divorce was finally completed and Violet married him after his release from prison in 1906.

Lord Roden died in London in 1897 and is buried in Great St. Mary's church in Sawbridgeworth, Hertfordshire.

There is a pencil drawing of Jocelyn in the National Portrait Gallery by Frank Sargent.

== Churchill connection ==
Jocelyn was a friend of John Spencer-Churchill, a prominent Conservative politician and Winston Churchill's grandfather. Winston Churchill's brother John Strange Spencer-Churchill (known as "Jack") was born shortly after Jocelyn had inherited the Roden estate and was named in his honour. A 1969 biography of Jennie Churchill (Jennie: The Romantic Years 1854-1895 by Ralph Martin) claimed that John may have received his name because he was actually the result of an affair between Jocelyn and Jack's mother, but the evidence was strongly against the claim and one of Jack's sons sued the author successfully for libel.

Peerage of Ireland
Preceded by Robert Jocelyn	Earl of Roden; 1880–1897	Succeeded by William Henry Jocelyn
Peerage of the United Kingdom
Preceded by Robert Jocelyn	Baron Clanbrassil; 1880–1897	Extinct
