= Henry Barley =

16th-century English politician

- Born: c.1487
- Died: 12 November 1529
- Spouses: Elizabeth Northwood; Anne (surname unknown); Anne Jerningham
- Issue: William Barley; Anthony Barley; Anne Barley; Margaret Barley; Elizabeth Barley
- Father: William Barley
- Mother: Elizabeth Darcy

Henry Barley or Barlee (1487 – 12 November 1529), of Albury, Hertfordshire, was a Member of Parliament during the Tudor period.

== Family ==
Henry Barley, born about 1487, was the son of William Barley (1451–1521) of Albury, Hertfordshire, and Elizabeth Darcy (died 1520), the daughter of Sir Robert Darcy of Danbury, Essex. He had three sisters:

- Ann Barley (died after 1 Oct 1557), who married first Sir Robert Sheffield (ca. 1462-1518); secondly, Sir John Grey, who was the son of the 1st Marquis of Dorset; and lastly, Sir Richard Clement of Ightman Mote, Kent (d. 1538).
- Dorothy Barley (died 1557), the last Abbess of Barking Abbey.
- Elizabeth Barley, who married firstly, as his third wife, Sir Ralph Jocelyn (d. 25 October 1478), Lord Mayor of London in 1464 and 1476, and secondly Sir Robert Clifford (d. 15 March 1508), third son of Thomas Clifford, 8th Baron de Clifford. Sir Robert Clifford was a Knight of the Body and Master of the Ordnance to King Henry VII, and one of the earliest supporters of the pretender to the Crown, Perkin Warbeck. There is a canopied altar tomb with brasses to Elizabeth (née Barley) and her second husband, Sir Robert Clifford, in the parish church at Aspenden, Hertfordshire, and portraits of Elizabeth and both her husbands in the stained glass windows of Holy Trinity church, Long Melford, Suffolk.

== Career ==
Although in 1495 Barley’s father, William, was attainted of treason for his support of Perkin Warbeck, and thereby forfeited his property to the Crown, he was pardoned three years later, and by 1501 was once again in possession of his lands, including the manors of Wicken, Elsenham, Albury, Wickhamstead and Moulsham.

Henry Barley was admitted to the Middle Temple on 3 February 1511. He served as a commissioner for goal delivery and for the subsidy in Hertfordshire, and served as a Justice of the Peace for the county from 1521 until his death. He succeeded his father in 1522 and was appointed Sheriff and Hertfordshire for 1523–24. In 1529 he was elected to Parliament for Hertfordshire.

Barley died 12 November 1529. He left a will dated 20 October 1529 in which he requested burial beside his first wife, Elizabeth, in the parish church at Albury, and appointed his sister, Anne (née Barley), as one of his executors.

== Marriages and issue ==
Barley married firstly, before 1517, Elizabeth Northwood, the daughter and coheir of John Northwood of Milton alias Middleton, Kent, by whom he had two sons and three daughters:

- William Barley, who married Joyce Perient, the daughter of Sir John Perient of Digswell, Hertfordshire, Auditor of the Court of Wards and Liveries.
- Anthony Barley, who died without issue.
- Anne Barley, who married Philip Gunter (died 1583), a member of the Worshipful Company of Skinners and an alderman of London.
- Margaret Barley.
- Elizabeth Barley (died 9 May 1592), who married her father's ward, Edward Leventhorpe (d. 22 December 1551) of Shingle Hall in Sawbridgeworth. There is a monument to Elizabeth (nér Barley) and her husband in the parish church at Sawbridgeworth.

He is said to have married secondly a wife named Anne about whom nothing further is known.

He married thirdly Anne (née Jerningham), the daughter of Sir Edward Jerningham (d. 6 January 1515) of Somerleyton, Suffolk, by Margaret Bedingfield (d. 24 March 1504). At the time of her marriage to Barley, Anne (née Jerningham) was the widow of Lord Edward Grey (d. before 1517), eldest son and heir of Thomas Grey, 1st Marquess of Dorset, and grandson of King Edward IV's wife, Elizabeth Woodville. According to the History of Parliament, Barley had one son and three daughters by Anne (née Jerningham); however according to Challen and Richardson, there were no issue of the marriage, and Barley's children were all his children by his first wife, Elizabeth.

After Barley's death, his widow, Anne (née Jerningham) married Sir Robert Drury, and after his death, Sir Edmund Walsingham. She died in 1559, having had no issue by any of her marriages.
