= Isaac Mann =

Church of Ireland Bishop of Cork and Ross

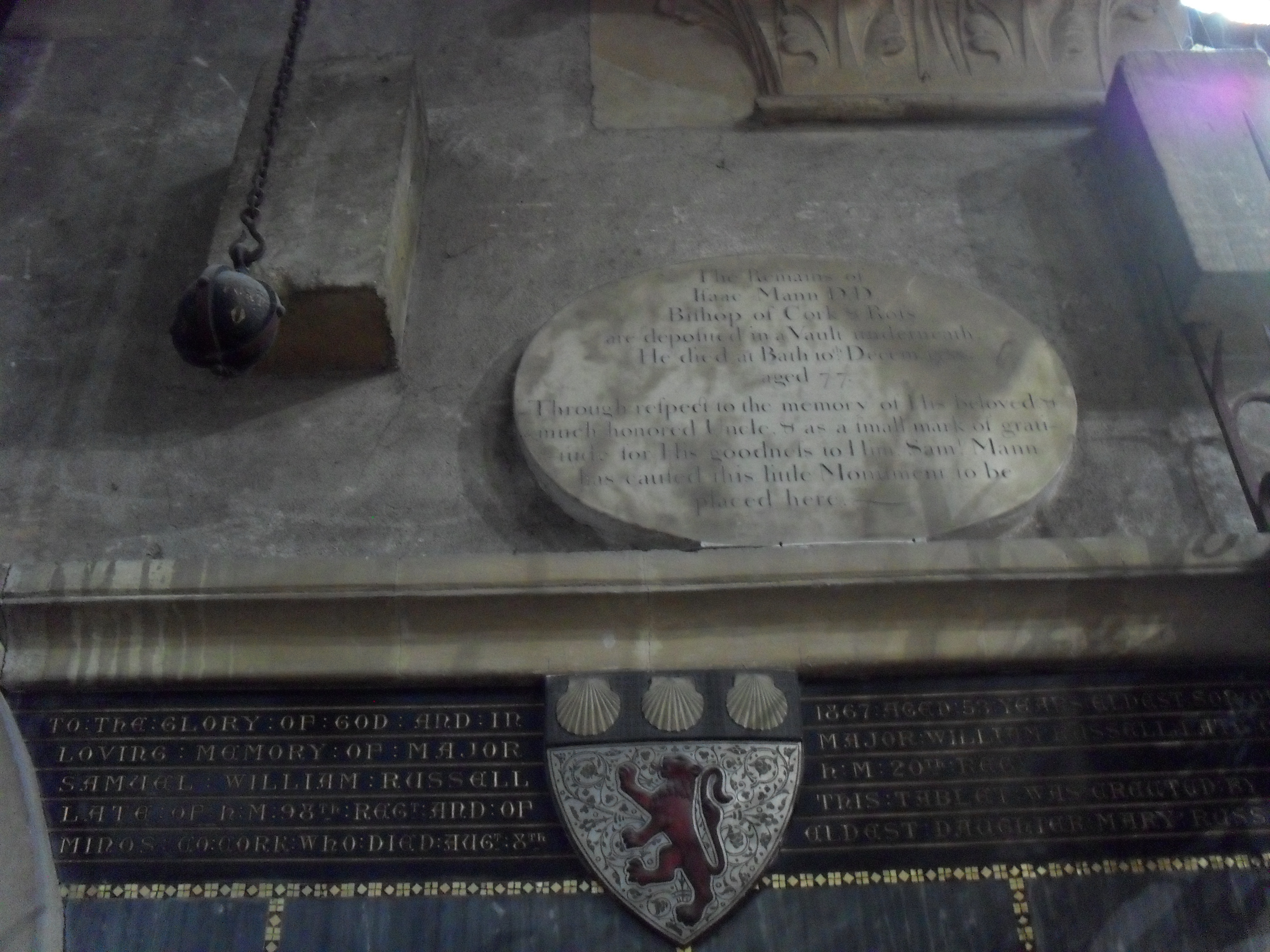
Tomb of Bishop Mann in Saint Fin Barre's Cathedral.

Isaac Mann (December 1710 – 10 December 1788) was Church of Ireland Bishop of Cork and Ross from 1772 to 1788.

Mann was born in Norwich in 1710 and was brought to Ireland as a child, being supported by Lord Chancellor of Ireland Robert Jocelyn, 1st Viscount Jocelyn. He served as Jocelyn's household chaplain for several years. It was a standing joke in Dublin that Mann was frequently mistaken for Jocelyn, since Mann had far more of the grand manner than Jocelyn, who was notably modest and unassuming.

Mann was educated at Trinity College, Dublin, obtaining a scholarship in 1730. He was Archdeacon of Dublin from 1757 until his elevation to the episcopate.

Mann died in Bath, Somerset in 1788. He was buried in Ballinaspic, then his remains were transferred to Saint Fin Barre's Cathedral in 1861.

He had no children of his own but adopted his nieces Frances and Susannah Mann. Frances married Christopher Townshend, and Susannah married the Venerable Joseph Weld, Archdeacon of Ross.
