= Emily Temple, Viscountess Palmerston =

British countess (1787–1869)

The Right Honourable The Viscountess Palmerston
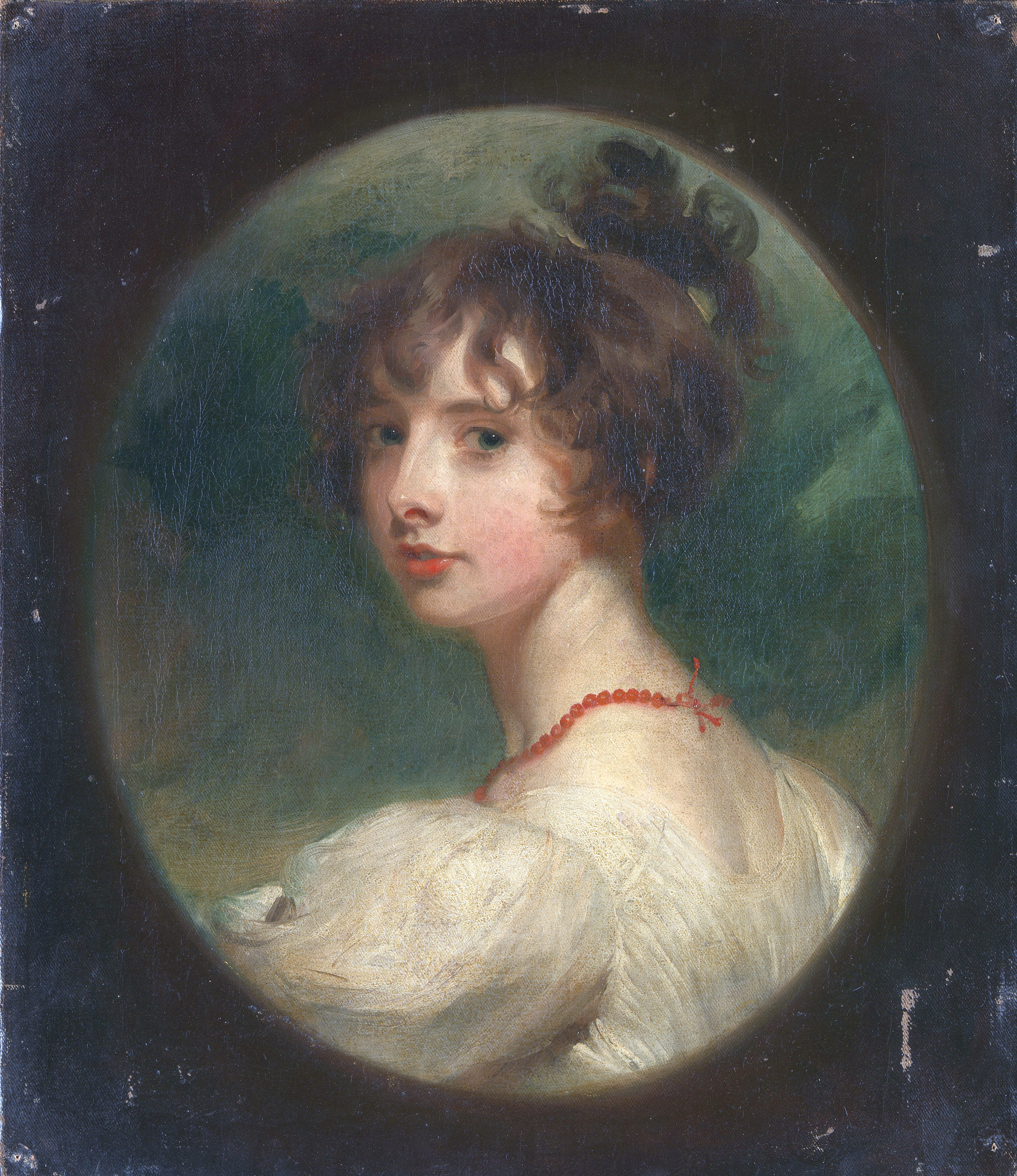
- Portrait of Lady Emily Lamb, aged 16, by Sir Thomas Lawrence
- Born: Emily Lamb; 1787
- Died: 1869 (aged 81–82)
- Known for: Spouse of the prime minister of the United Kingdom (1855–58; 1859–65)
- Spouses: Peter Clavering-Cowper (m. 1805; died 1837) Henry John Temple (m. 1839; died 1865)
- Children: George Cowper, 6th Earl Cowper; Lady Emily Cowper; William Cowper-Temple, 1st Baron Mount Temple; Charles Cowper; Frances Jocelyn, Viscountess Jocelyn
- Parent(s): Peniston Lamb, 1st Viscount Melbourne; Elizabeth Milbanke

Emily Temple, Viscountess Palmerston (née Lamb, later Clavering-Cowper; 1787–1869), styled The Honourable Emily Lamb from 1787 to 1805 and Countess Cowper from 1805 to 1839, was a leading figure of the Almack's social set, sister of Prime Minister Lord Melbourne, wife of the 5th Earl Cowper, and subsequently wife of another Prime Minister, Lord Palmerston.

== The Lamb family ==
Emily was born in 1787 to Peniston Lamb and his wife, Elizabeth (née Milbanke). Due to her mother's numerous love affairs, her true paternity was never verified, and has been described as being "shrouded in mystery". The Lamb family had been politically prominent since the mid-18th century, reaching their zenith of influence in Emily's generation. Her father was made Viscount Melbourne in 1781. Her eldest brother William Lamb twice held the premiership of England, while another brother, Frederick Lamb, was a noted diplomat, and a third, George Lamb, was a minor playwright and journalist of the era. The Lambs were closely linked with the Whig party, and were intimates of Queen Victoria.

There was a lifelong bond between William and Emily, whom he fondly called "that little devil Emily"; by contrast she detested his wife, Lady Caroline Lamb (whom she called "the little beast").

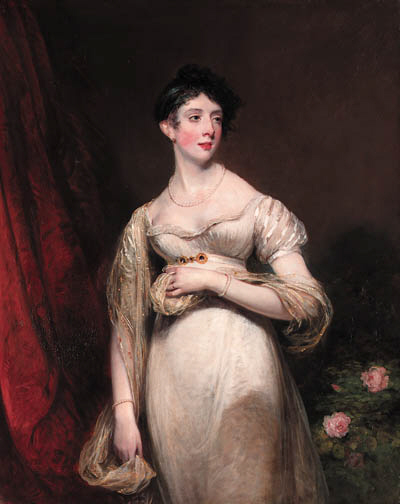
Portrait of Emily Lamb, Countess Cowper by William Owen, ca. 1810

== First marriage ==
Aged eighteen, Emily married Peter Clavering-Cowper, 5th Earl Cowper (1778–1837), who was nine years her senior. Lord Cowper had a reputation for dullness and slowness of speech which were in marked contrast to his wife's social gifts; a more favourable opinion was that he was a quiet, pleasant man who was far less stupid than he appeared to be, but preferred to avoid society and politics. Emily threw herself into the Regency social scene, becoming one of the patronesses of the highly exclusive Almack's club.

She was noted for kindness and generosity, and would do anything for a person she liked. She would even help people she disliked: although she detested her sister-in-law Caroline, when Caroline was barred from Almack's, a sign of the deepest social disgrace, Emily eventually managed to get the ban lifted. Like many of the society ladies of the age, she had love affairs, including one with the Corsican diplomat Carlo Andrea Pozzo di Borgo, later Russian Ambassador to Great Britain.

Emily was noted not only for beauty but for her extraordinary charm: she was described as "grace put in action, whose softness was as seductive as her joyousness". She was undoubtedly the most popular patroness of Almack's, her warmth and charm being a notable contrast to the rudeness and arrogance of some of the other ladies who ran the club, especially Lady Jersey and Princess Lieven.

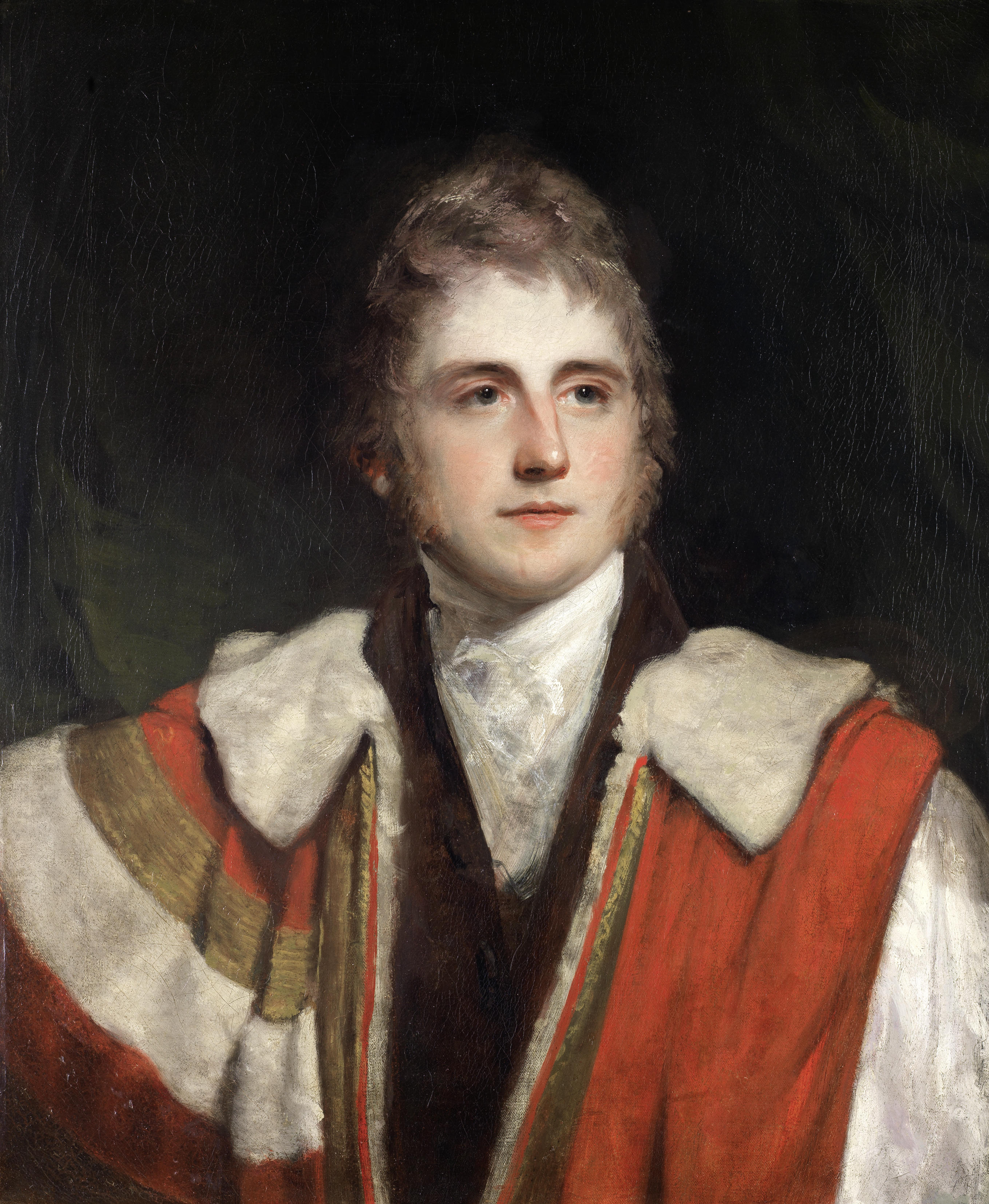
Lord Cowper

== The affair with Palmerston ==
At Almack's, Lady Cowper was increasingly seen in the company of Henry John Temple, 3rd Viscount Palmerston, who was known as "Cupid" at the time for his various romantic dalliances, including affairs with Emily's fellow patronesses of Almack's, Dorothea Lieven and Sarah Villiers, Countess of Jersey. Palmerston was a regular fixture of her parties and salons, and as Lord Cowper sank into a long period of ill health and general decline, Lady Cowper and Lord Palmerston entered into a romantic relationship. This brought Palmerston, originally a Tory, increasingly in contact with notable Whigs, particularly Emily's brother. Of an 1826 proposal for Catholic Emancipation, Palmerston said, "the Whigs supported me most handsomely, and were indeed my chief and most active friends". Soon after, Palmerston switched affiliations and ran as a Whig candidate. Emily's mother on her deathbed in 1818 urged her to remain constant to Palmerston, possibly looking forward to a future time when they would be free to marry.

== Marriage to Palmerston ==
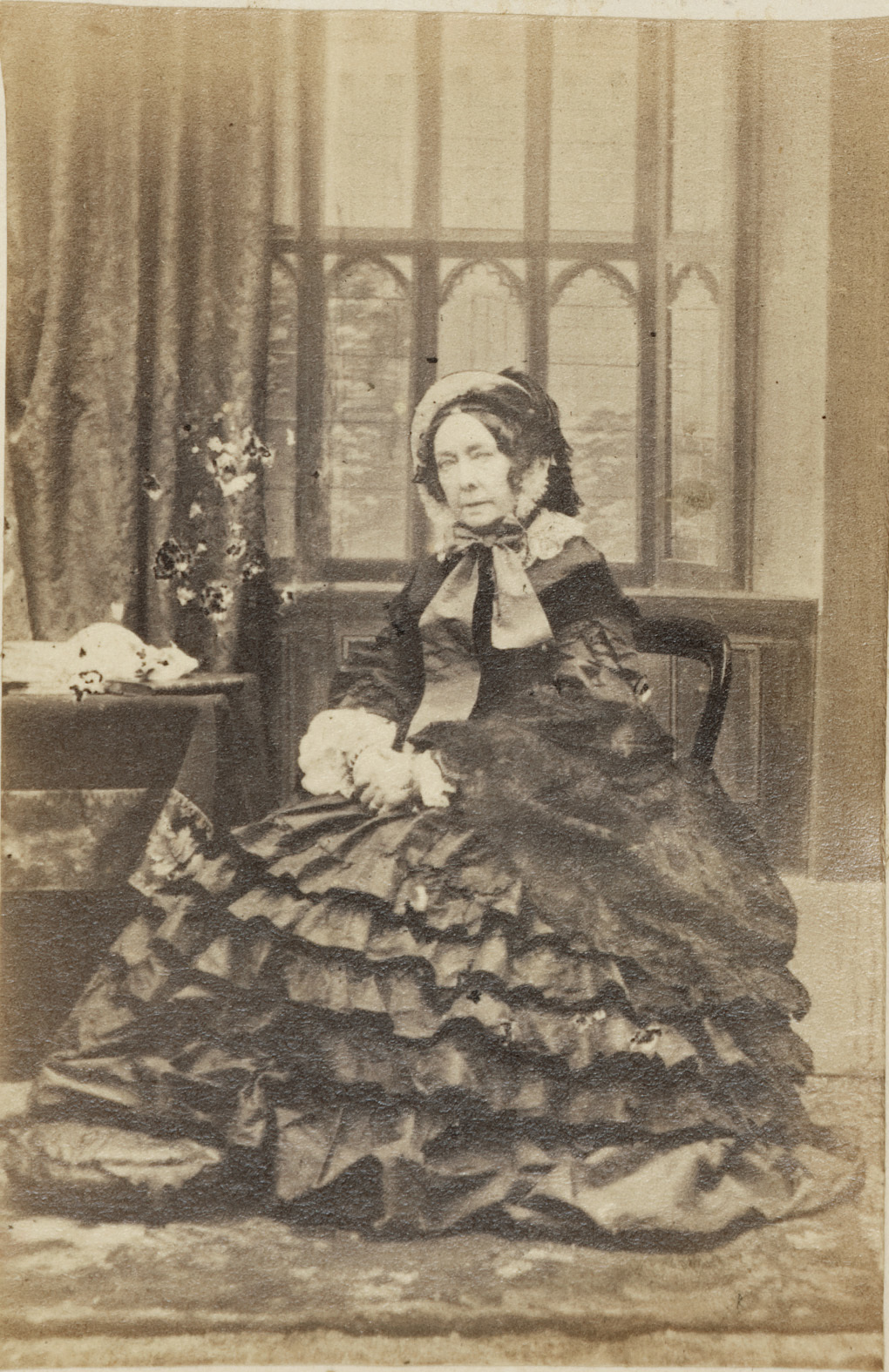
Lady Palmerston in 1860

In 1837, Lord Cowper died, two days into the reign of Queen Victoria. This left the way open for a marriage between Emily and Palmerston, though their age was a cause for concern, as, in the eyes of her family, was Palmerston's reputation as a womaniser. The matter was referred to Queen Victoria, whose approval cleared the way for the marriage on 16 December 1839. Palmerston was 55 at the time, and Lady Cowper was 52.

They set up their home at Broadlands and the union was, by all accounts, a decidedly happy one. Of it, Lord Shaftesbury said, "His attentions to Lady Palmerston, when they both of them were well stricken in years, were those of a perpetual courtship. The sentiment was reciprocal; and I have frequently seen them go out on a morning to plant some trees, almost believing that they would live to eat the fruit, or sit together under the shade."

During the marriage, Lady Palmerston continued an active social role as a salon hostess. As the events were eagerly attended by foreign diplomats, Lord Palmerston would encourage his wife to float his ideas before the assembled guests and report back on their reception as a means of unofficially testing the diplomatic waters before committing himself publicly to an opinion. She could not cure his notorious lack of punctuality since this was a fault she shared to the full; Queen Victoria, while staying with them at Broadlands, complained that Emily had kept her waiting for an hour for a carriage ride. It was a standing joke in London society that they were always so late for dinner that neither of them had ever heard of soup. Psychologically the two were very well-matched. Biographer Herbert Bell states:

If Palmerston brought the greater sum of knowledge and pure intellect to the partnership, his lady was richly dowered in other qualities: sound sense and delicate sensibilities, warmed by beauty and good-heartedness into charm; shrewdness, so linked with impulsiveness that one wonders still how far her ‘indiscretions’ were planned for effect; earnestness and enthusiasm that admit of no such doubt.

Biographer Gillian Gill states the marriage:

was an inspired political alliance as well as a stab at personal happiness. Harry and Emily were supremely well-matched. As the husband of a beautiful, charming, intelligent, rich woman whose friends were the best people in society, Palmerston at last had the money, the social setting, and the personal security he needed to get to the very top of British politics. Lady Palmerston made her husband happy, as he did her, and she was a political power in her own right. In the last and most successful decades of Palmerston’s life, she was his best advisor and most trusted amanuensis. Theirs was one of the great marriages of the century.

== Personal life ==
Lady Cowper was said to be a central figure in Regency high society, especially from 1809–1820, serving as one of the powerful patronesses of Almack’s Assembly Rooms, whose approval effectively determined entry into London Society. She was said to be well connected through her family and marriage, she was at the heart of elite social and political circles and maintained close ties with leading Whig figures. Contemporary letters and diaries consistently describe her as a beauty of her time, tactful and intelligent, very well-educated and warm-tempered, which is notably contrasted with the sharper manners of some of her fellow patronesses.

== Death ==
In 1865, Lord Palmerston died, and Lady Palmerston followed him four years later, in 1869.

== Issue ==
She had five children, three sons and two daughters, all born during her marriage to Lord Cowper, although one of the daughters, Emily, was believed to have been fathered by Palmerston, and her son William may have been fathered by Pozzo di Borgo.

- George Cowper, 6th Earl Cowper (26 June 1806 – 15 April 1856), he married Anne Florence Weddell, Baroness Lucas (daughter of Thomas) on 7 October 1833. They had six children.
- Lady Emily Cowper (1810 – 15 October 1872), she married Anthony Ashley-Cooper, 7th Earl of Shaftesbury on 10 June 1830. They had ten children.
- William Cowper-Temple, 1st Baron Mount Temple (13 December 1811 – 17 October 1888), he married Harriet Gurney on 27 June 1843. He remarried Georgina Tollemache on 22 November 1848.
- The Honorable Charles Spencer Cowper (7 June 1816 – 30 March 1879), he married Lady Harriett Gardiner (daughter of Charles John Gardiner, 1st Earl of Blessington) on 1 September 1852, she was widow of Alfred Comte d'Orsay (died Aug 1852). They had one daughter. He remarried to Jessie McLean on 11 April 1871. He inherited Sandringham House in 1843 and sold it to Queen Victoria's eldest son and heir, Albert Edward, in 1862.
- Frances Jocelyn, Viscountess Jocelyn (1820 – 26 March 1880), she married Robert Jocelyn, Viscount Jocelyn, the eldest son of Robert Jocelyn, 3rd Earl of Roden on 9 April 1841. They had five children.

== Arms ==
Coat of arms of Emily Temple, Viscountess Palmerston
Notes These are the arms to which Lady Melbourne was entitled to as a widow, impaling her late husband's and father's arms on a lozenge. Escutcheon Impaled Dexter Quarterly 1st & 4th, Or, an eagle displayed sable (for Leofric, Earl of Mercia); 2nd & 3rd Argent, two bars sable, each charged with three martlets or (Temple); Sinister Sable on a fess erminois between three cinquefoils argent, two mullets of the field (Lamb). Supporters Two lions gules collared and chained or, on each collar two mullets sable.
