= Emily Ashley-Cooper, Countess of Shaftesbury =

British aristocrat

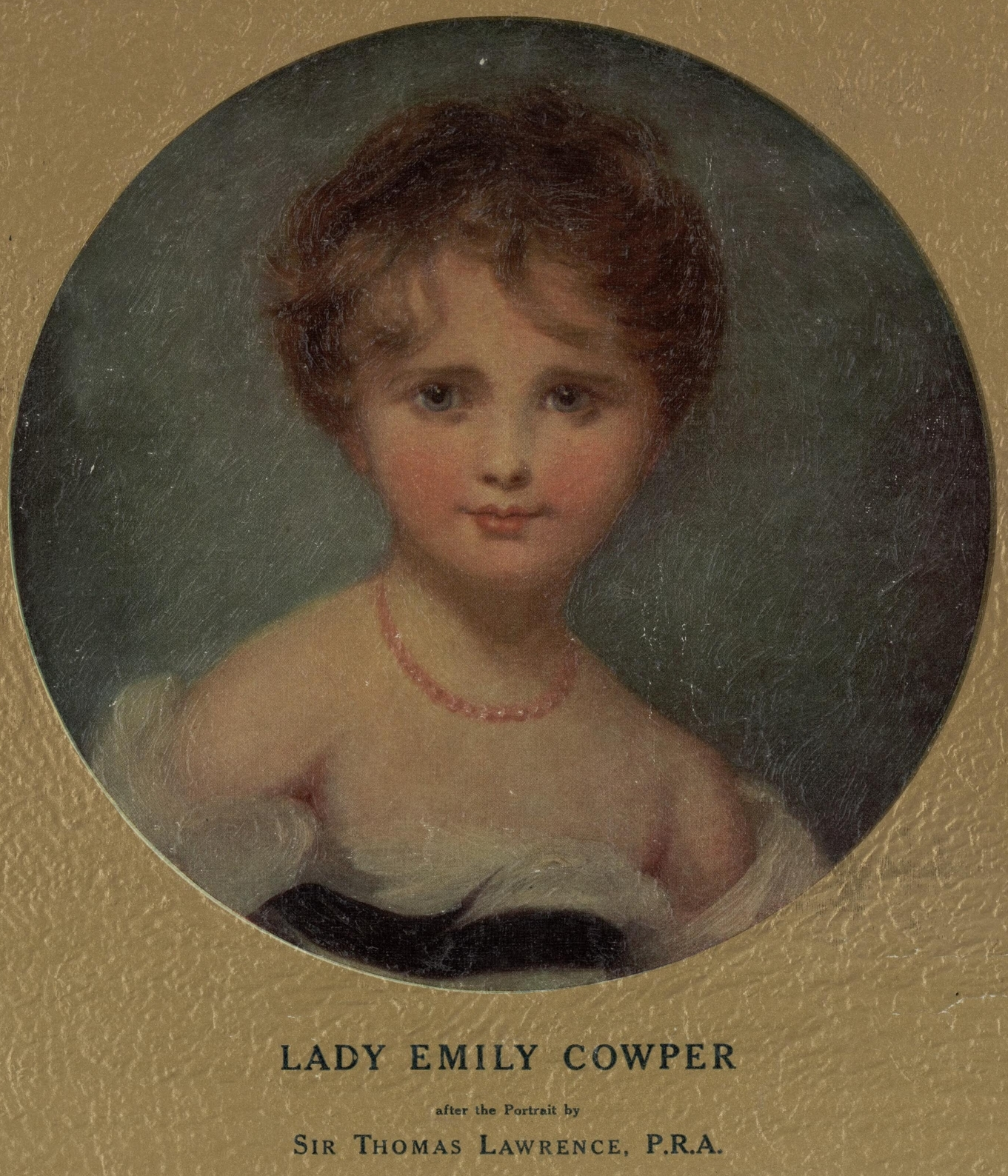
Lady Emily Cowper as a child

Emily Caroline Catherine Frances Ashley-Cooper, Countess of Shaftesbury (6 November 1810 – 15 October 1872), formerly Lady Emily Cowper, was the wife of Anthony Ashley-Cooper, 7th Earl of Shaftesbury, and the mother of the 8th earl.

The daughter of Peter Clavering-Cowper, 5th Earl Cowper, and his wife Emily, Lady Emily was familiarly known as "Minny". It was widely believed that her natural father was Henry John Temple, 3rd Viscount Palmerston, whom her mother married in 1839, following Earl Cowper's death.

Emily was the second child of the Cowpers, after her brother, George Cowper, 6th Earl Cowper. Her younger brothers were William Cowper-Temple, 1st Baron Mount Temple, and The Honorable Charles Cowper. Emily's younger sister, Francess, became a viscountess.

She married Shaftesbury, then known as Lord Ashley and the heir of Cropley Ashley-Cooper, 6th Earl of Shaftesbury, on 10 June 1830. They had ten children:

1. Anthony Ashley-Cooper, 8th Earl of Shaftesbury (1831–1886), who married Lady Harriet Chichester, daughter of George Chichester, 3rd Marquess of Donegall, and had children.
2. Hon. (Anthony) Francis Henry Ashley-Cooper (1833–1849)
3. Hon. (Anthony) Maurice William Ashley-Cooper, third son (1835–1855)
4. Rt. Hon. Evelyn Melbourne Ashley (1836–1907), who was married twice: first, to Sybella Charlotte Farquhar, daughter of Sir Walter Rockcliffe Farquhar, 3rd Bt., and second, to Lady Alice Elizabeth Cole, daughter of William Willoughby Cole, 3rd Earl of Enniskillen; there was one child from the first marriage
5. Lady Victoria Elizabeth Ashley, later Lady Templemore (1837–1927), who married Harry Chichester, 2nd Baron Templemore and had children.
6. Hon (Anthony) Lionel George Ashley-Cooper (1838–1914), who married Frances Elizabeth Leigh and had no children.
7. Lady Mary Charlotte Ashley-Cooper (1842–1861)
8. Lady Constance Emily Ashley-Cooper, known as "Conty" (1845–1872)
9. Lady Edith Florence Ashley-Cooper (1847–1913)
10. Hon. (Anthony) Cecil Ashley-Cooper (1849–1932)

In 1851, Ashley-Cooper succeeded to the earldom of Shaftesbury, at which point his wife became countess. Several of the couple's children suffered ill-health, and the news that Lady Constance's life depended on her going abroad for the winter, as well as the illness of her youngest son, Cecil, caused the countess to fall ill also.

The countess died at the couple's town house in Grosvenor Square, London, aged 61. Her husband described her as "my earthly mainstay", and as a "wonderful combination of truth, simplicity, joyousness of heart and purity of spirit". Lady Constance died two months later in London.
