= Robert Jocelyn, 1st Viscount Jocelyn =

Irish politician, Lord Chancellor of Ireland

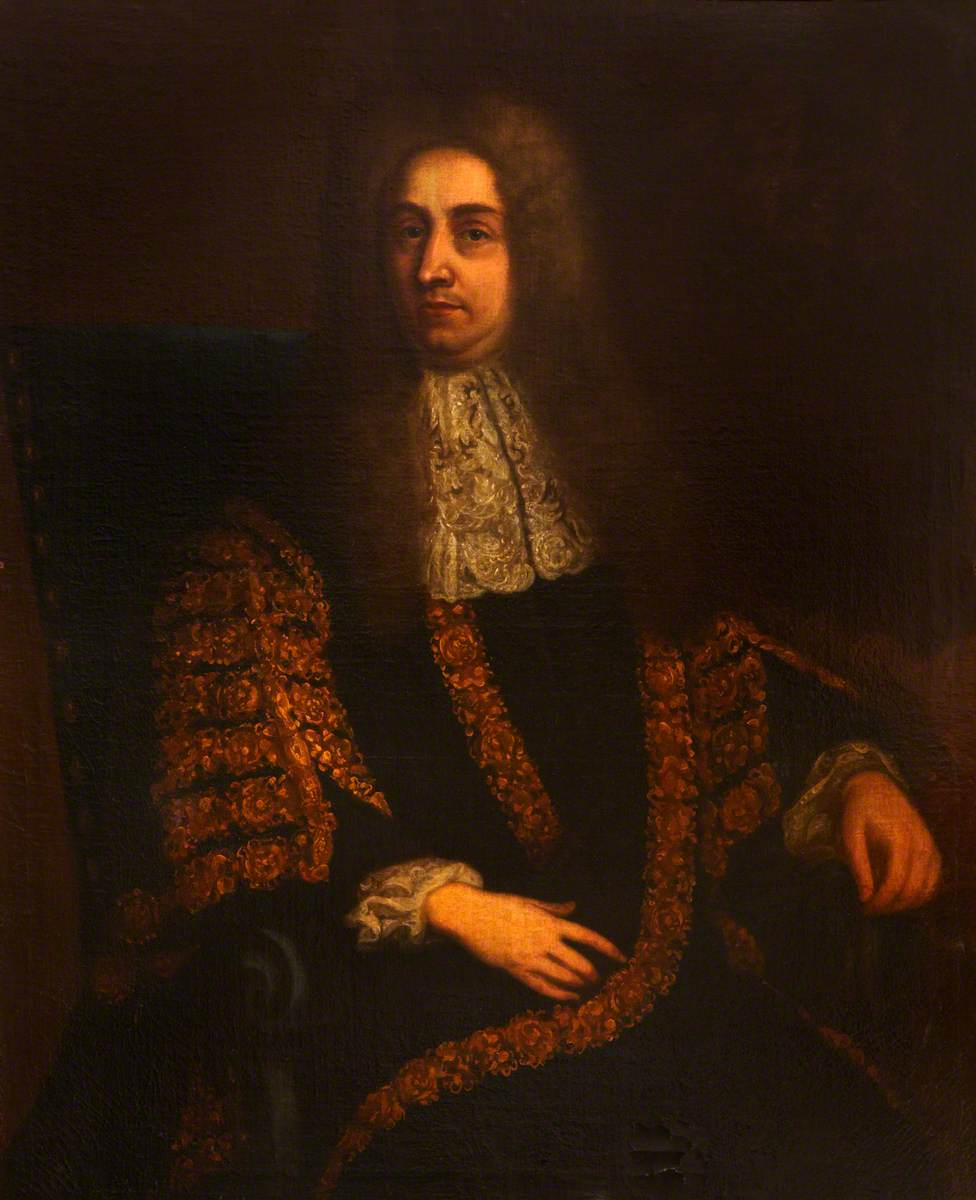
Robert Jocelyn, 1st Viscount Jocelyn

Robert Jocelyn, 1st Viscount Jocelyn PC (I) SL (c. 1688 ? – 3 December 1756) was an Anglo-Irish politician and judge and member of the Peerage of Ireland, best known for serving as Lord Chancellor of Ireland.

== Biography ==
=== Early life ===
Jocelyn was the eldest son of Thomas Jocelyn of Sawbridgeworth, Hertfordshire, and Anne Bray, daughter of Thomas Bray of Westminster. His paternal grandfather was Sir Robert Jocelyn, 1st Baronet, a High Sheriff of Hertfordshire. The Jocelyn are recorded as living in Sawbridgeworth since at least the fifteenth century: notable members of the family included Ralph Josselyn of Hyde Hall (died 1478), who was twice Lord Mayor of London.

He appears to have studied law for some time in the office of an attorney named Salkeld in Brooke Street, Holborn, where he made the acquaintance of Philip Yorke, 1st Earl of Hardwicke, (who served concurrently as Lord High Chancellor of Great Britain during Jocelyn's term as Lord Chancellor of Ireland) and afterwards Lord Hardwicke.

=== Early career ===
Jocelyn was admitted as a student of Gray's Inn in 1709, he was called to the Irish Bar on 27 January 1719, and at a by-election in September 1725 was returned to the Irish House of Commons for Granard, County Longford. He was appointed Third Serjeant on 28 March 1726, and at the general election in 1727 was elected for Newtown, County Down.

=== Law Officer ===
On 4 May 1727, he became Solicitor-General. On the accession of George II Jocelyn was confirmed in his office, and on 22 October 1730 was promoted to the post of Attorney-General, in the place of Thomas Marlay, lately appointed Lord Chief Baron. In 1739 as Attorney-General he prosecuted Lord Santry for the unprovoked murder of Laughlin Murphy, a tavern porter. Santry was convicted and sentenced to death, but he was reprieved and went free.

=== Lord Chancellor ===
On the resignation of Thomas, Lord Wyndham, Jocelyn, through the influence of his old friend Lord Hardwicke, was appointed Lord Chancellor (7 September 1739), and took his seat as speaker of the Irish House of Lords at the opening of Parliament on 9 October 1739. He was created Baron Newport, of Newport, in the County Tipperary by letters patent dated 29 November 1743.

As Lord Chancellor, he was one of those charged with designing measures to alleviate the Famine of 1740–1, which was so severe that it became known as "the year of slaughter". One historian has criticised the measures which were put in place as both harsh and ineffective.

On 3 February 1744 he presided as Lord High Steward at the trial of Nicholas Netterville, 5th Viscount Netterville, who was indicted for the murder of his manservant Michael Walsh, but was "honourably acquitted", on the grounds that the two main witnesses against him had died before the trial, and their depositions could not be relied on as evidence. Surprisingly little is known about the details of the crime.

He was created Viscount Jocelyn, also in the peerage of Ireland, by letters patent dated 6 December 1755 In September 1756 the Great Seal of Ireland was put in commission during Jocelyn's absence from Ireland for the recovery of his health. He never returned, and, dying in London on 3 December 1756, aged 68, was buried at Sawbridgeworth, Hertfordshire.

== Character assessment and memorials ==
Jocelyn is described by Lord Chesterfield as "a man of great worth". He possessed an amiable character, and literary and antiquarian tastes. He served no fewer than nine times as one of the Lords Justices during the absence of the Lord Lieutenant of Ireland, and was president of the Dublin Physico-Historical Society. Among the Addit. MSS. in the British Museum there is an interesting letter written by Jocelyn (dated Dublin 2 November 1754) to the Duke of Newcastle, calling the duke's attention to "the very extraordinary height to which the disputes and animosities here have been unhappily carried".

He had a house at St Stephen's Green in the city centre, and later leased Mount Merrion House, to the south of Dublin, from Viscount FitzWilliam. He was a man of simple tastes and unassuming manner: it was noted with amusement that both his chaplain, Isaac Mann (later Bishop of Cork and Ross), and his house steward Mr Wilde were frequently mistaken for him, as both had far more of the grand manner expected of a nobleman than Jocelyn did. He was happiest at home at Mount Merrion, rarely leaving it in his leisure time, his main recreation being walks in the surrounding countryside (now suburban, Merrion was then largely open country).

Elrington Ball states that though in politics he remained an Englishman, his love for his adopted country, which he scarcely left in the last twenty years of his life, entitles him to be called an honorary Irishman.

Two portraits of Jocelyn by the leading artist Stephen Slaughter were in the possession of the Earl of Roden in 1890. A marble bust by John Bacon was erected to his memory in Sawbridgeworth Church by his son.

== Family ==
Jocelyn married, firstly, in 1720, Charlotte (died 23 February 1747), daughter and co-heiress of Charles Anderson of Worcester; her sister Anne married Timothy Goodwin, Archbishop of Cashel. Robert and Charlotte's only son, Robert, succeeded his father as second viscount, and was created Earl of Roden of High Roding in the county of Tipperary on 1 December 1771. The death of Charlotte, "the best of wives" caused him intense grief.

On 15 November 1754 Jocelyn married, secondly, Frances, daughter of Thomas Claxton of Dublin, and widow of Richard Parsons, 1st Earl of Rosse. Though short-lived, this marriage was also a happy one. She survived her second husband, and died on 25 May 1772.

== Notes ==
Parliament of Ireland
Preceded by James Peppard; Charles Coote	Member of Parliament for Granard; 1725–1727; With: Charles Coote	Succeeded by James Macartney; John Folliott
Preceded by Richard Tighe; Hon. William Ponsonby	Member of Parliament for Newtownards; 1727–1739; With: Sir John Vesey	Succeeded by Sir John Vesey; Hon. John Ponsonby
Legal offices
Preceded by Thomas Marlay	Solicitor-General for Ireland; 1727–1730	Succeeded by John Bowes
Preceded by Thomas Marlay	Attorney-General for Ireland; 1730–1739	Succeeded by John Bowes
Preceded by The Lord Wyndham	Lord Chancellor of Ireland; 1739–1756	Succeeded by John Bowes
Peerage of Ireland
New creation	Viscount Jocelyn; 1755–1756	Succeeded by Robert Jocelyn
New creation	Baron Newport; 1743–1756	Succeeded by Robert Jocelyn
