= Caiseal =

The Gaelic name Caiseal may refer to:

- Ringfort, a circular defensive fort.
- Cashel (disambiguation), various places, mainly in Ireland
- Caiseal Mor, an Australian fantasy author
