= Richard Rigby =

British politician (1722–1788)

The Right Honourable Richard Rigby
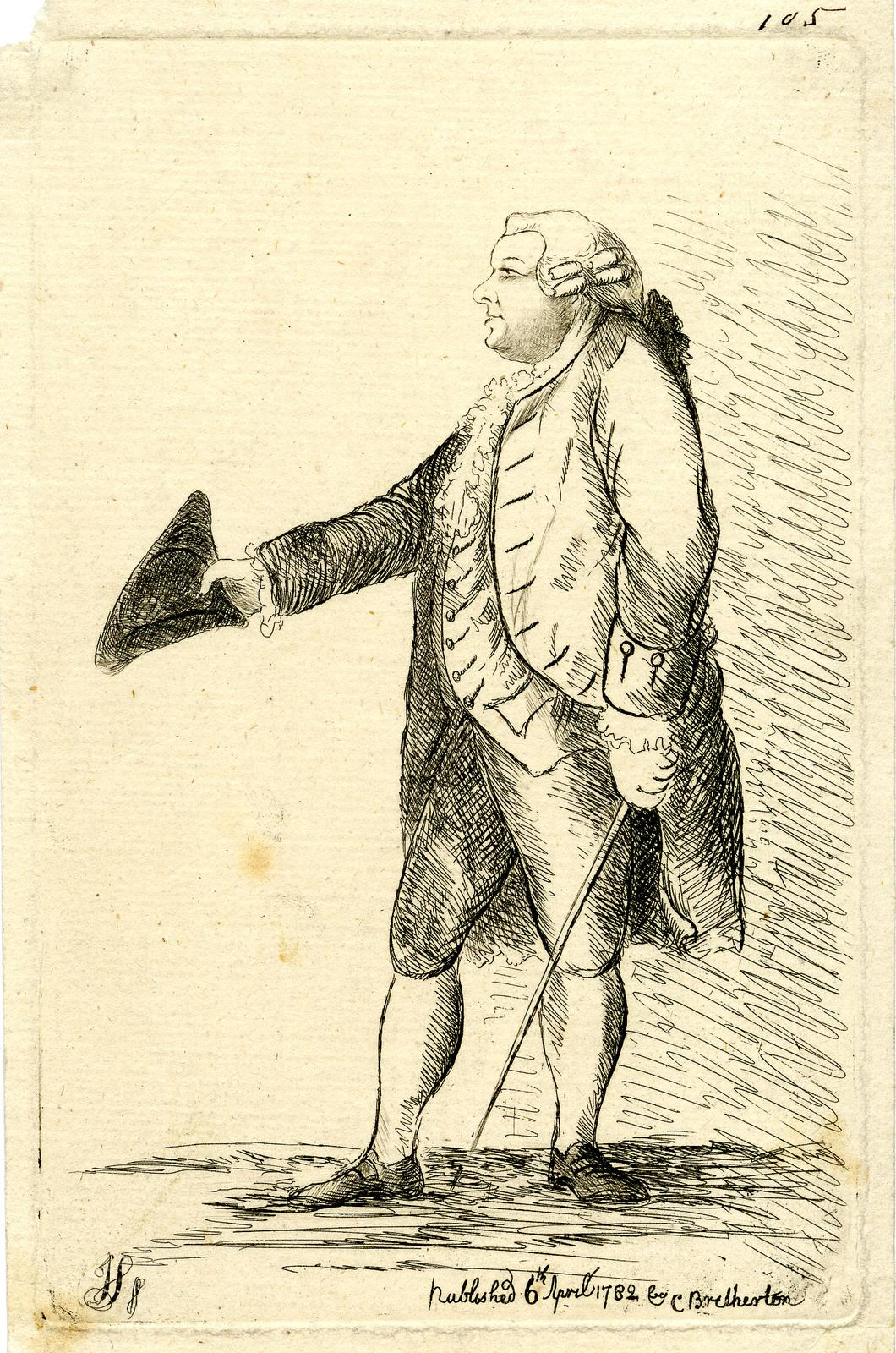

Chief Secretary for Ireland
- In office 1757–1761
- Preceded by: Henry Seymour Conway
- Succeeded by: William Gerard Hamilton

Personal details
- Born: 2 February 1722
- Died: 8 April 1788 (aged 66)

Richard Rigby PC (February 1722 – 8 April 1788) was a British politician who sat in the British House of Commons for 43 years from 1745 to 1788. He served as Chief Secretary for Ireland and Paymaster of the Forces. Rigby accumulated a fortune serving the Crown and politician wheeler-dealers in the dynamic 18th-century parliament.

== Background and education ==
The Rigby family took Mistley Hall in Essex as the site of their manor, but was descended from the Rigby of Burgh family. Rigby's father and immediate ancestors made a fortune as merchant drapers in the City of London, as merchants and colonial officers in the West Indies, and as speculators in the South Sea Bubble. Richard Rigby's father also had the same name, and was significant in the history of Jamaica, serving as its secretary, the provost marshal, and a member of the Royal Assembly in the late 17th and early 18th century.

He was also part-owner of a plantation in Antigua and a slave trader. His elder brother James also served as a colonial officer on the island. Richard and James Rigby were sons of Edward Rigby of Mistley Hall, a London draper and landowner based in Covent Garden, and Anne Hyde, a close cousin of Queen Anne (Hyde), Queen Anne, Queen Mary, and the Earl of Clarendon. Edward and Ann had a London townhouse in the parish of St Andrews High Holborn. Rigby was educated at Corpus Christi College, Cambridge and the Middle Temple.

== Political career ==
Rigby was elected Member of Parliament for Castle Rising in 1745, transferring to Sudbury at the next general election, and was initially a partisan of Frederick, Prince of Wales. Subsequently, he transferred his allegiance to the Duke of Bedford, sitting as Member of Parliament (MP) for the Bedford pocket borough of Tavistock and eventually becoming the Bedford Whigs' permanent "man of business" in the House of Commons.

In June 1753 he wrote to Bedford enclosing the first issue of the opposition weekly The Protester and praising it as “an extremely good preface to a political paper.”

In December 1755 he became a junior minister as one of the Lords of Trade and in 1757, he retained a seat in the Irish House of Commons for Old Leighlin, which he held until 1761. When Bedford was appointed Lord-Lieutenant of Ireland in 1758, in a time of relative peace, Rigby accompanied him as Secretary; the following year he was appointed Master of the Rolls in Ireland. In theory, this was a senior judicial office, but in practice, it was a sinecure and Rigby never sat as a judge. In 1762 Rigby was seriously considered for promotion to Secretary at War, but he preferred to remain in lucrative sinecures rather than to accept more substantive office, and instead was made in 1765 joint Vice-Treasurer of Ireland. His career was also hampered by his violent temper, which caused him to lash out indiscriminately at everyone around him, although when in a good temper he was a model of courtesy and charm. All those who knew him admitted to finding him a puzzling and contradictory character.

In 1768, Rigby was transferred to perhaps the most lucrative of all government posts, Paymaster of the Forces, which he held for the next 16 years. He took a prominent part in opposing John Wilkes, and later led objections to a public funeral for Pitt the Elder. When he died in 1788, he was said to have left "nearly half a million of public money".

== Wealth ==
Rigby spent much of his fortune reinvesting in the family seats of Mistley and Manningtree, employing the top architects and landscape artists of the day to build a port and a spa. The latter endeavour failed, but the ruins of Mistley Towers survive as a tourist destination. Though other members of the family continued to bear the Rigby name and arms, the bulk of Richard Rigby's wealth fell to his sister Martha who married General Bernard Hale, and ultimately to the Pitt-Rivers family. Richard had an illegitimate daughter called Sarah by Sarah Lucas (widow), of Ipswich.

== Sources ==
- Concise Dictionary of National Biography (1930)
- Lewis Namier & John Brooke, The History of Parliament: The House of Commons 1754–1790 (London: HMSO, 1964)
- Leigh Rayment's Historical List of MPs

Parliament of Great Britain
Preceded by Viscount Andover; Charles Churchill	Member of Parliament for Castle Rising; 1745 – 1747; With: Viscount Andover	Succeeded by The Lord Luxborough; Thomas Howard
Preceded by Thomas Fonnereau; Carteret Leathes	Member of Parliament for Sudbury; 1747 – 1754; With: Thomas Fonnereau	Succeeded by Thomas Fonnereau; Thomas Walpole
Preceded by Thomas Brand; Sir Richard Wrottesley	Member of Parliament for Tavistock; 1754–1788; With: Jeffrey French 1754; Richard Vernon 1754–1761; Richard Neville Aldworth 1761–1774; Richard Fitzpatrick 1774–1788	Succeeded by Richard Fitzpatrick; Lord John Russell
Parliament of Ireland
Preceded by Hon. Robert Jocelyn; Thomas Carter	Member of Parliament for Old Leighlin; 1757–1761; With: Thomas Carter	Succeeded by John Bourke; Francis Andrews
Political offices
Preceded by Henry Seymour Conway	Chief Secretary for Ireland; 1757–1761	Succeeded by William Gerard Hamilton
Preceded by George Cooke; Thomas Townshend	Paymaster of the Forces; 1768–1782	Succeeded by Edmund Burke
Preceded by Henry Singleton	Master of the Rolls in Ireland; 1759–1788	Succeeded by The Duke of Leinster
