= Thomas Carter (Old Leighlin MP) =

Irish politician (1720–1765)

Thomas Carter (1720 – 10 September 1765) was an Irish politician. He was a Member of Parliament (MP) for the borough of Old Leighlin in County Carlow from 1745 to 1761.

He was the eldest son of Thomas Carter, one of the leading Irish statesmen of the era, and Mary Claxton, daughter of Thomas Claxton of Dublin. He married Anne Armytage, daughter of Sir Samuel Armytage, 1st Baronet, and Anne Griffith. They had one daughter Maria who married Skeffington Thompson. His widow remarried John Nicholson.

His marriage, only a few days after his father's death, caused some comment. It was suggested that his father had discouraged him from marrying due to a chronic illness, probably tuberculosis, which caused his early death two years later.

Parliament of Ireland
Preceded by Thomas Trotter; John Beauchamp	Member of Parliament for Old Leighlin; 1745–1761; With: Hon. Robert Jocelyn 1745–1757; Richard Rigby 1757–1761	Succeeded by John Bourke; Francis Andrews
