= Ralph Josselyn =

Member of the Parliament of England

Sir Ralph Josselyn (or Jocelyn) KB (died 25 October 1478) was a 15th-century English politician who held several political offices, including two terms as Lord Mayor of London.

== Family background ==
Ralph Josselyn was the son of Jeffrey Josselyn of Hyde Hall in Sawbridgeworth, Hertfordshire, by his wife Katherine Bray. His eldest brother, Thomas Josselyn, was the ancestor of the Earls of Roden.

== Career ==
As Josselyn's elder brother inherited their father's lands on his death, he went to make his career in London. He became a member of the Worshipful Company of Drapers, of which he would become the Master in 1457-8. He became an alderman, of Cornhill Ward, in 1456. In 1458 he was elected one of the Sheriffs of the City of London. In 1464 he was elected to the first of his two mayoral terms. During this term, he was one of four London citizens made a Knight of the Bath, at the coronation of Edward IV's queen, Elizabeth Woodville.

After his first mayoral term, Josselyn continued to be active in the city's affairs. He was elected to Parliament, representing the City of London, in 1467. In 1471, he raised a force to repel the assault of Thomas Neville, Bastard of Fauconbridge, when the latter attacked the city in an unsuccessful attempt to rescue the imprisoned King Henry VI from the Tower of London.

Josselyn was elected to a second term as mayor in 1476. During this term, he initiated a huge effort to repair the city's walls, which had fallen into grave disrepair. He procured massive quantities of bricks and lime, levied taxes to pay for the significant costs of the repairs, and provided for the work to be supervised by a hand-picked panel of citizens representing each of the city's wards. He also took measures to curb the abuses of bakers and victuallers within the city.

== Personal life ==
Josselyn seems to have married three times. His first wife, Margery, may have been either the daughter or the widow of another draper, Thomas Aylesby. His second wife, Philippa, was the daughter of Philip Malpas, another London alderman and (unlike Josselyn) a staunch Lancastrian; her sister married Thomas Cooke, another mayor of London. His third wife was Elizabeth Barley, daughter of William Barley and sister of Henry Barley, MP for Hertfordshire; she survived him and married Sir Robert Clifford, son of Thomas Clifford, 8th Baron Clifford. She and her new husband were sued by her father over ownership of a manor in Linslade, previously owned by Josselyn.

Josselyn died on 25 October 1478 and was buried at St Swithin's Church in London, of which he had been a benefactor; a memorial erected to him in Sawbridgeworth church has caused some authors to state he was buried there. He seems to have had no surviving children, as his heir was his nephew George Josselyn, son of his elder brother Thomas.

== Literary representation ==
Josselyn appears in the Elizabethan playwright Thomas Heywood's Edward IV. In the play, Josselyn is portrayed as a comic, buffoonish character, quite at odds with historical reality.
