= Frances Jocelyn, Viscountess Jocelyn =

British courtier and amateur photographer

Frances Cowper
- Viscountess Jocelyn
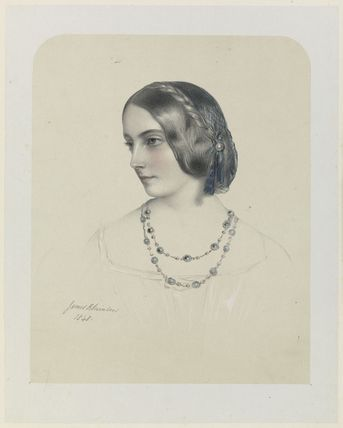
- Lithograph of Viscountess Jocelyn, c. 1849
- Full name: Lady Frances Elizabeth Cowper
- Born: 9 February 1820; London, England
- Died: 26 March 1880 (aged 60); Cannes, France
- Husband: Robert Jocelyn, Viscount Jocelyn (m. 1841; died 1854)
- Issue: Edith Gore, Viscountess Sudley; Robert Jocelyn, 4th Earl of Roden
- Father: Peter Cowper, 5th Earl Cowper
- Mother: Emily Lamb, Countess Cowper

Frances Elizabeth Jocelyn, Viscountess Jocelyn, VA (née Cowper; 9 February 1820 – 26 March 1880) was a British courtier and amateur photographer. She was born as the youngest daughter of Peter Cowper, 5th Earl Cowper and his wife Emily Lamb. However, some have speculated that she and her brother William were fathered by Henry John Temple, 3rd Viscount Palmerston, who Lady Cowper married in 1839, after Cowper's death. Before her marriage, Lady Frances served as one of the trainbearers at the coronation of Queen Victoria, and she also served as a bridesmaid at the wedding of the queen to Prince Albert in 1840.

Lady Frances married Robert Jocelyn, Viscount Jocelyn, the son and heir of the 3rd Earl of Roden, in 1841, and became a Lady of the Bedchamber to the queen later that year. Lord Jocelyn died in 1854, devastating his wife. Lady Jocelyn later turned to photography, focusing on domesticity, a subject that was common for women photographers in the Victorian era. The Encyclopaedia of Nineteenth-century Photography has written that her photographic collages – collections of cut-up images re-inserted onto painted backdrops – and use of watercolours "subverted the realistic nature of photography".

== Family and early life ==
Lady Frances Elizabeth Cowper was born in 1820, the youngest daughter of Emily Lamb, Countess Cowper, a daughter of Peniston Lamb, 1st Viscount Melbourne. Her paternity was officially attributed to Lady Cowper's husband, the 5th Earl Cowper. However, the historian K. D. Reynolds and others have argued that Henry John Temple, 3rd Viscount Palmerston was actually the father of Lady Frances and her brother William. Once widowed, her mother married Palmerston, though Lady Frances did not care for him. He became Prime Minister in 1859.

== Marriage ==
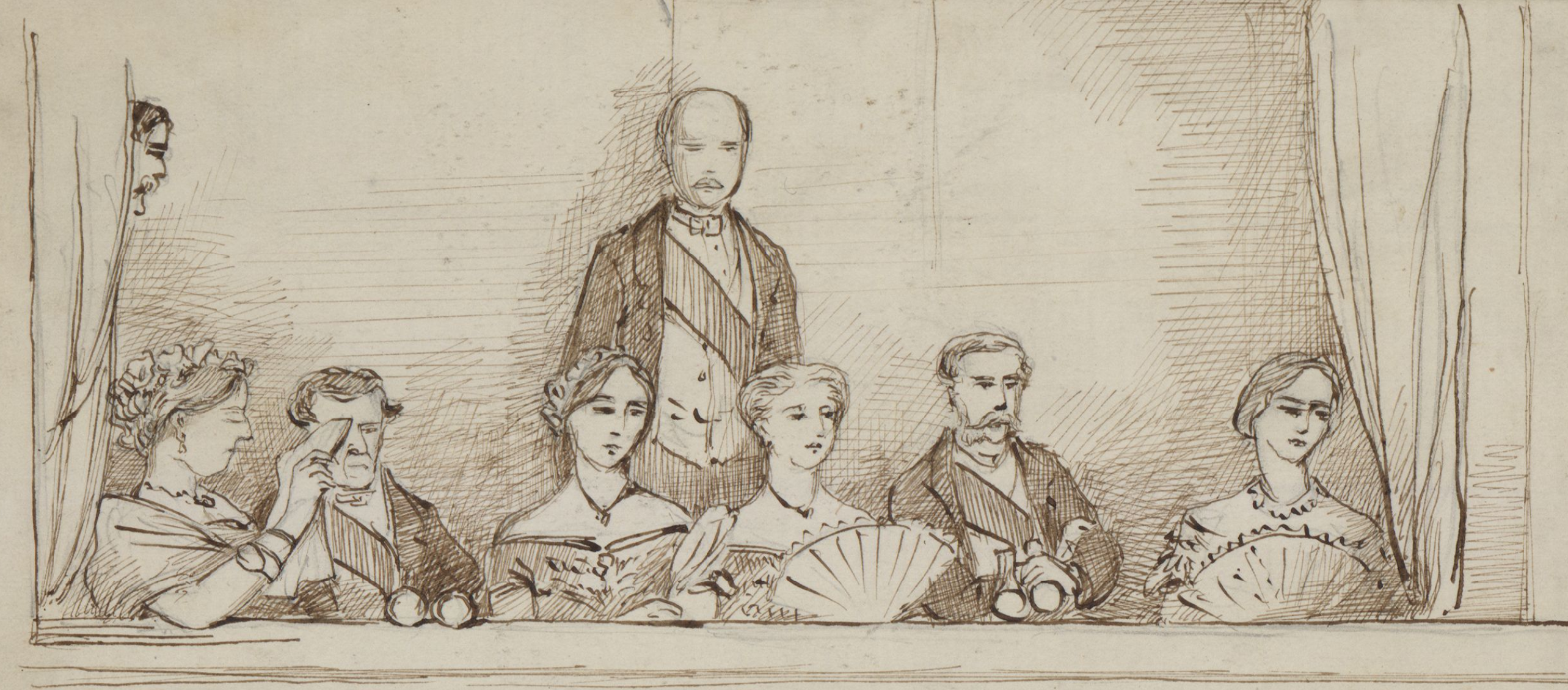
Lady Frances (far right) at the opera with Queen Victoria (far left) and other European Royals, 1857

In 1838, Lady Frances served as a maid of honour at the Coronation of Queen Victoria, and she also served as a bridesmaid at the wedding of the queen to Prince Albert in 1840.

It was expected that Lady Frances would secure a good marriage, being considered a great beauty. On 9 April 1841, Lady Frances married the politician Robert Jocelyn, Viscount Jocelyn, the eldest son and heir of the 3rd Earl of Roden. He was born on 20 February 1816, making him four years older than his wife. Now by courtesy a viscountess, Lady Jocelyn was appointed a Lady of the Bedchamber to the queen later that year, holding that position until 1867.

The Cowper family was secular, while Lord Jocelyn's family was considered sternly religious. Upon their marriage, they moved to Northern Ireland to live on his family's estate. They had five children together. Lord Jocelyn was staying in the Tower of London in preparation for departure to the Crimea when he contracted cholera. After his subsequent death in 1854 at the Palmerstons' house, Lady Jocelyn blamed herself and went into isolation, limiting her contact largely towards her children. After her daughter Alice's death in 1867, she looked after Alice's children as well. Her eldest son Robert succeeded his grandfather in 1870 as Earl of Roden.

== Photography ==
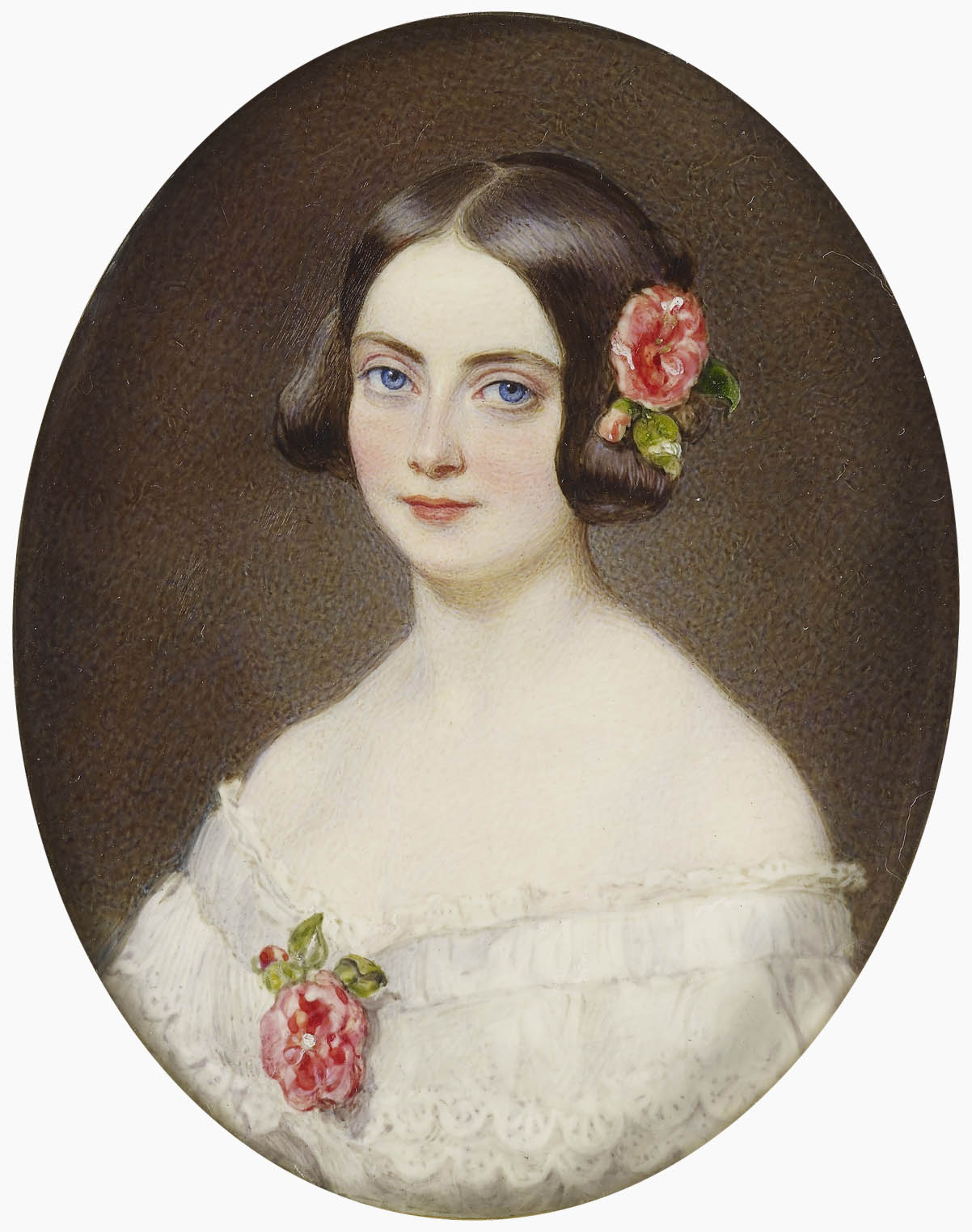
Watercolour miniature of Lady Jocelyn, c. 1841. This is a copy that Queen Victoria commissioned in 1882.

The widowed Lady Jocelyn turned to photography in 1858, possibly with the encouragement of Dr Ernst Becker (1826–1888), Prince Albert's tutor, librarian and private secretary, who was himself encouraged to learn photography by the Prince, and who became a founding member of Royal Photographic Society. Lady Jocelyn soon developed into an accomplished photographer in both landscape and portraiture, and it was clearly an activity of high importance to her in this period of her life – despite being a titled member of the British nobility, she gave her occupation as "photographer" in the 1861 Census. In 1859 she was elected as a member of the Royal Photographic Society and later also joined the Amateur Photographic Association, formed in 1861. In 1862 she exhibited four landscape photographs of the Palmerston estate, Broadlands, at the International Exhibition in London, where the jurors of the Exhibition's Photography Department awarded her an "honourable mention for artistic effect in landscape photography". Several of her photographs were shown under the heading of "Groups and Landscapes" at the International Exhibition in Dublin in 1865.

Women were among the first to engage in the emerging field of photography, whose flexibility, when compared to other art forms, allowed women more freedom to engage in subject matter that interested them, since there was no hierarchy or body of regulations that governed their work. Most women photographers focused on domesticity, choosing to feature their families in an array of images. Keeping within this trend, Lady Jocelyn produced a series of albums in the 1850s. Her photographic collages – collections of cut-up images inserted onto painted backdrops – and use of watercolours "subverted the realistic nature of photography," according to the Encyclopaedia of Nineteenth-century Photography. This publication also describes the work of her and Lady Mary Georgina Filmer as "demonstrat[ing] the creative energy and inventiveness that could be invested in the production of photographic collages".

Viscountess Jocelyn's interest in photography declined in the 1870s. She spent much of her time travelling with her children, visiting seaside resorts in England and France for her health. She died on 24 March 1880 in Cannes, France. All five of her children died before their mother. Several years after her death, Queen Victoria commissioned the artist Eduardo de Moira to copy a miniature that William Ross had made of Lady Jocelyn decades earlier.

== Issue ==
Lord and Lady Jocelyn had five children:

- Hon. Victoria Alexandrina Emily Jocelyn (23 September 1842 – 7 September 1843)
- Hon. Alice Maria Jocelyn (2 December 1843 – 29 November 1867)
- Hon. Edith Elizabeth Henrietta Jocelyn (10 February 1845 – 3 October 1871), married Arthur Gore, Viscount Sudley (later Earl of Arran).
- Robert Jocelyn, 4th Earl of Roden (20 March 1846 – 10 January 1880)
- Hon. Frederick Spencer Jocelyn (11 July 1852 – 12 November 1871)

== See also ==
- List of women photographers
