= Percy Jocelyn =

Irish Anglican bishop

The Rt Revd and Hon. Percy Jocelyn
- Bishop of Clogher
- Church: Church of Ireland
- Province: Province of Armagh
- Installed: 1820
- Term ended: 21 October 1822
- Predecessor: Lord John Beresford
- Successor: Lord Robert Tottenham
- Previous post: Bishop of Ferns and Leighlin

Orders
- Consecration: 13 September 1809 by Charles Dalrymple Lindsay

Personal details
- Born: 29 November 1764
- Died: 3 September 1843 (aged 78)
- Denomination: Anglicanism
- Parents: The 1st Earl of Roden; Lady Anne Hamilton
- Education: Trinity College Dublin

The Rt Rev. and Hon. Percy Jocelyn (29 November 1764 – 3 September 1843) was Anglican Bishop of Clogher in the Church of Ireland from 1820 to 1822. He was forced from his position due to being caught in homosexual practices, which had been outlawed under the Buggery Act 1533.

== Early life ==
He was the third son of the 1st Earl of Roden, whose family estates were in Castlewellan, County Down, by his wife Lady Anne Hamilton. He graduated with a B.A. from Trinity College Dublin. At Trinity, he was regarded as something of a bookworm, spending much of his time in his rooms on Library Square. He was later described as "a tall thin young man with a pale, meagre and melancholy countenance, and so reserved in his manners and recluse in his habits that he was considered by everybody to be both proud and unsociable".

== Career ==
He was rector of Tamlaght, archdeacon of Ross (1788–1790), treasurer of Armagh (1790–1809), a prebend of Lismore (1796–1809), and bishop of Ferns and Leighlin (1809–1820) before becoming bishop of Clogher.

=== 1811 scandal ===
In 1811, James Byrne (who had been a coachman for Jocelyn's brother, John) accused him of "taking indecent familiarities" and of "using indecent or obscene conversations with him". Byrne was sued for criminal libel by Bishop Jocelyn and on conviction was sentenced to two years in gaol and also to public flogging. After he recanted his allegations at the prompting of the bishop's agent, the floggings were stopped.

=== 1822 scandal ===
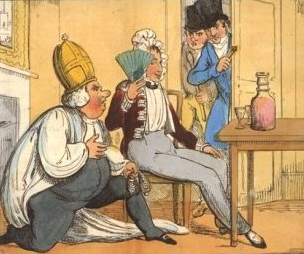
1822 satirical cartoon, "Confirmation"

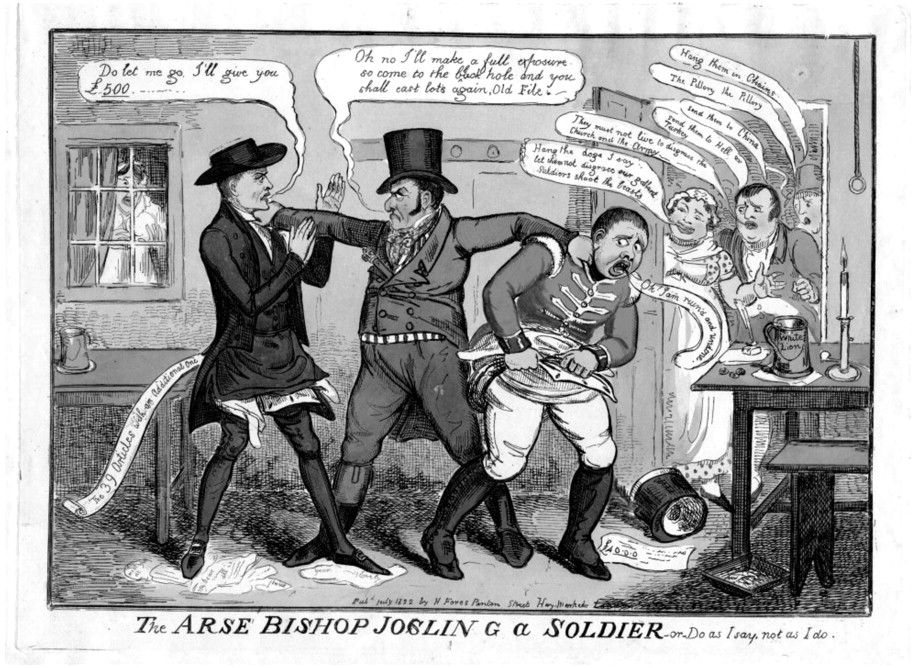
The Bishop of Clogher; caricature by George Cruikshank

On 19 July 1822, Bishop Jocelyn, then aged 57, was caught in a compromising position with a 22-year-old Grenadier Guardsman, John Moverley, in the back room of The White Lion public house, St Albans Place, off The Haymarket in Westminster. He and Moverley were released on bail, provided by the 3rd Earl of Roden and others. Jocelyn broke bail and moved to Scotland where he worked as a butler under an assumed name. He was declared deposed in his absence by the Metropolitan Court of Armagh in October 1822 for "the crimes of immorality, incontinence, Sodomitical practices, habits, and propensities, and neglect of his spiritual, judicial, and ministerial duties". A public subscription was raised to raise money for James Byrne, whose 1811 conviction was now recognised as a miscarriage of justice.

Bishop Jocelyn was the most senior British or Irish churchman to be involved in a public homosexual scandal in the 19th century. It became a subject of satire and popular ribaldry, resulting in more than a dozen illustrated satirical cartoons, pamphlets, and limericks, such as:

The Devil to prove the Church was a farce
Went out to fish for a Bugger.
He baited his hook with a Soldier's arse
And pulled up the Bishop of Clogher.

(This rhyme is dependent on the English reader's ignorance of the pronunciation of Irish placenames; the see is pronounced like "KLAW-er" or "KLOH-er.")

The scandal was so great, that in the days following, "it was not safe for a bishop to show himself in the streets of London", according to Charles Manners-Sutton, Archbishop of Canterbury at the time. In August 1822, The 2nd Marquess of Londonderry (better known to history as Lord Castlereagh), who was both the Foreign Secretary and Leader of the House of Commons, had an audience with King George IV where he said that he was being blackmailed, and that "I am accused of the same crime as the Bishop of Clogher". Lord Londonderry committed suicide shortly afterwards and was thought to have been in a paranoid state at the time.

== Legacy ==
After Bishop Jocelyn's death, it was reported that he had been living quietly for four years at Salisbury Place, Edinburgh, under the assumed name Thomas Wilson, and had previously lived in Glasgow. The plate on his coffin carried no inscription except (in Latin): "Here lie the remains of a great sinner, saved by grace, whose hopes rest in the atoning sacrifice of the Lord Jesus Christ".

However, some years ago the Jocelyn family vault in Kilcoo Parish Church in Bryansford, County Down, Northern Ireland, was opened and it was discovered that it contained one more coffin than the number of grave markers indicated, and that the extra coffin was unmarked. This extra coffin may be that of the dethroned Bishop of Clogher.

For 178 years after the scandal, the Church of Ireland refused to let historians see its papers on the affair. In the 1920s, Archbishop D'Arcy of Armagh ordered that they be burned, but this order was not obeyed. The files were released for Matthew Parris's research for his book The Great Unfrocked.
