= Ann Henning Jocelyn =

Swedish-born Irish playwright, translator, and author

- Born: Ann Margareta Maria Henning; 1948 (age 77–78); Gothenburg, Sweden
- Other names: Ann Jocelyn, Countess of Roden
- Education: University of Gothenburg (BA, 1970); Lund University (BA, 1977)
- Occupations: Writer, translator, screenwriter
- Title: Countess of Roden
- Spouse(s): Robert Jocelyn, 10th Earl of Roden (m. 1986)
- Children: 1
- Website: annhenningjocelyn.com

Ann Henning Jocelyn (born 1948) is a Swedish-born playwright, translator and author, based in Ireland since the 1980s.

== Biography ==
Ann Margareta Maria Henning was born in Gothenburg in 1948. She was raised in Dalsland, on the Norwegian border, and Molndal, outside Gothenburg. While in school she discovered that her love of literature got her bullied, but her ability to write plays which entertained her classmates ensured that even her worst bully was more interested in her next work.

She went on to attend University of Gothenburg in 1968, where she got a degree in classical architecture and drama. On graduation she got a job there as a junior lecturer in art history. But Jocelyn decided she didn't want to settle down and went to London to study theatre at Studio 68. When she left school there Jocelyn got a position in the Open Space Theatre in London, working with Charles Marowitz.

When getting a permit to work in London proved to be more difficult than she had hoped, Jocelyn began to work translating plays and novels, adding a degree in English to her skills. She worked with Ingrid Bergman on translating her novel into Swedish.

In 1982, Jocelyn moved to her current home of Doonreagan House in Connemara. The owner of the house, Robert Jocelyn, 10th Earl of Roden, had lent it to her to work on a book. They married on 13 February 1986, and have a son. As a result of her husband's title, Jocelyn is Countess of Roden.

When they discovered that Ted Hughes had lived in the house she ended up working on her play Doonreagan, about the period when Ted Hughes and his partner Assia Wevill lived there.

Following a run of Doonreagan in London in 2013, her play Only Our Own, chronicling three generations of an Anglo-Irish family, opened in London's West End in 2014 and continued on tour in Ireland.

Her next project was a study of the Boleyn family, inspired by the fact that her husband and son were descendants of Mary Boleyn through her son Lord Hunsdon. It resulted in a stage play and a novel, both entitled The Sphere of Light.

Among the Scandinavian playwrights she translates is Nobel Laureate Jon Fosse, as well as musicals and opera.

== Bibliography ==
=== Books ===
- Life Harvest, 2021
- The Sphere of Light, 2019
- Only Our Own, 2014
- Doonreagan, 2013
- Keylines for Living, 2007
- Keylines, 2000
- The Cosmos and You, 1995
- Honeylove the Bearcub, 1995
- The Connemara Champion, 1994
- The Connemara Stallion, 1991
- The Connemara Whirlwind, 1990
- Modern Astrology, 1983

=== Plays ===
- Smile, Sweden, 1972
- Baptism of Fire, Ireland 1997, Pernik, Bulgaria 1999
- The Alternative, Ireland and U.K.,1998
- Becoming the Tree, adapted from the book by Jill Teck, Ireland 1999
- Doonreagan, Cashel 2013, London 2013, Cambridge 2013, Clifden 2015, Galway 2015, Dublin 2015
- Only Our Own, Dublin 2012, London 2014, Eastbourne 2015, Galway 2015, Dublin 2015
- The Sphere of Light, Cambridge, 2017, Hever Castle Theatre Festival 2023
