= Bryansford =

Village in County Down, Northern Ireland

Coordinates: 54.21°N 5.93°W

Bryansford: Irish: Áth Bhriain
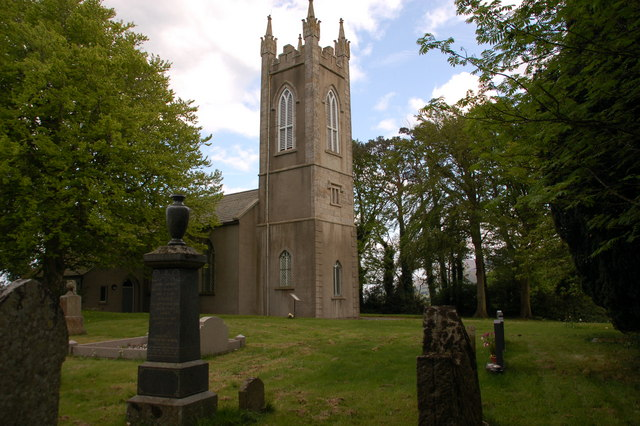
- Kilcoo parish church, Bryansford

- Location within County Down
- Population: 392 (2001 Census)
- District: Newry, Mourne and Down
- County: County Down
- Country: Northern Ireland
- Sovereign state: United Kingdom
- Post town: NEWCASTLE
- Postcode district: BT33
- Dialling code: 028
- UK Parliament: South Down
- NI Assembly: South Down

Bryansford is a small village in County Down, Northern Ireland. It sits at the northern side of Tollymore Forest Park, roughly halfway between the towns of Newcastle and Castlewellan. The village is within the townlands of Ballyhafry and Aghacullion, in the Civil parish of Kilcoo. It had a population of 392 people in the 2001 Census.

== Places of interest ==
Kilcoo Parish Church was built in 1712 by the Annesley family, whose family seat is in nearby Castlewellan. Percy Jocelyn, the Bishop of Clogher from 1820 to 1822, is thought to have been buried in the Roden family vault in the church.

Tollymore Forest Park, at the edge of the village, covers 630 hectares and was formerly owned by the Earl of Roden. Tollymore appears in Season 1 of Game of Thrones as part of "The North".

== People ==
- Sir Norman Stronge was born in the village.
- Jack Kyle lived his later life here.

== Sport ==
The village has a successful Gaelic football team, Bryansford GAC. The team have won the Ulster Senior Club Football Championship twice, in 1969 and 1970. They play their home matches in St. Patricks Park in the nearby town of Newcastle.

== 2001 Census ==
Bryansford is classified as a rural settlement by the NI Statistics and Research Agency (NISRA) On Census day (29 April 2001) there were 392 people living in Bryansford. Of these:

- 27.6% were under 16 years old and 14.8% were aged 60 and above
- 49.5% of the population were male and 50.5% were female
- 61.4% were from a Catholic Community Background and 34.3% were from a 'Protestant and Other Christian (including Christian related)' Community Background.
- 1.2% of people aged 16–74 were unemployed.
