= Robert Jocelyn, 1st Earl of Roden =

Irish peer and politician (1731–1797)

Robert Jocelyn, 1st Earl of Roden (baptised 31 July 1731 – 21 June 1797) was an Irish peer and politician. He was the only son of Robert Jocelyn, 1st Viscount Jocelyn and his first wife Charlotte Anderson.

Jocelyn was MP for Old Leighlin from 1743 to 1756 and Auditor-General of the Exchequer from 1750 until his death.

He succeeded to the peerage on the death of his father on 3 December 1756, and on 1 December 1771, he was created Earl of Roden, of High Roding in County Tipperary. On the death of his cousin, Sir Conyers Jocelyn, 4th Bt, of Hyde Hall, Sawbridgeworth, he also succeeded to the baronetcy.

== Family ==
On 11 December 1752, he married Lady Anne Hamilton (1730-1803), daughter of James Hamilton, 1st Earl of Clanbrassill and his wife Henrietta Bentinck, daughter of William Bentinck, 1st Earl of Portland. The marriage was a happy one, and gave great pleasure to his father, who had been deeply saddened by his own wife's death.

He died in York Street, Dublin. He was succeeded by his eldest son, Robert Jocelyn, 2nd Earl of Roden, best remembered for the crucial, if somewhat ruthless, role he played in putting down the Irish Rebellion of 1798. The Dowager Countess, who spent much of her later life at her old home at Tollymore, County Down, describes the events of 1798 vividly in her diary. She inherited a large fortune when her brother James, 2nd earl of Clanbrassil died without issue less than a year after the death of her husband.

The Jocelyns had eleven children in all. Their son George was MP for Dundalk, jointly with his elder brother. Their third son Percy Jocelyn became Bishop of Clogher, but his career was ruined by a notorious sex scandal in 1822, and he lived out his life under an assumed name. His disgrace is known to have profoundly affected the mental state of Lord Castlereagh, who apparently developed a paranoid delusion that he was to be charged in connection with the Jocelyn case: this is thought to have been a major factor in Castlereagh's suicide.

Parliament of Ireland
Preceded by John Beauchamp; Thomas Trotter	Member of Parliament for Old Leighlin; 1743–1756; With: Thomas Carter	Succeeded by Richard Rigby; Thomas Carter
Peerage of Ireland
New creation	Earl of Roden; 1771–1797	Succeeded by Robert Jocelyn
Preceded by Robert Jocelyn	Viscount Jocelyn; 1756–1797	Succeeded by Robert Jocelyn
Baronetage of Ireland
Preceded by Conyers Jocelyn	Baronet (of Hyde Hall ) 1778–1797	Succeeded by Robert Jocelyn
