= Cashel, County Galway =

Village in County Galway, Ireland

Coordinates: 53.3701°N 9.82244°W

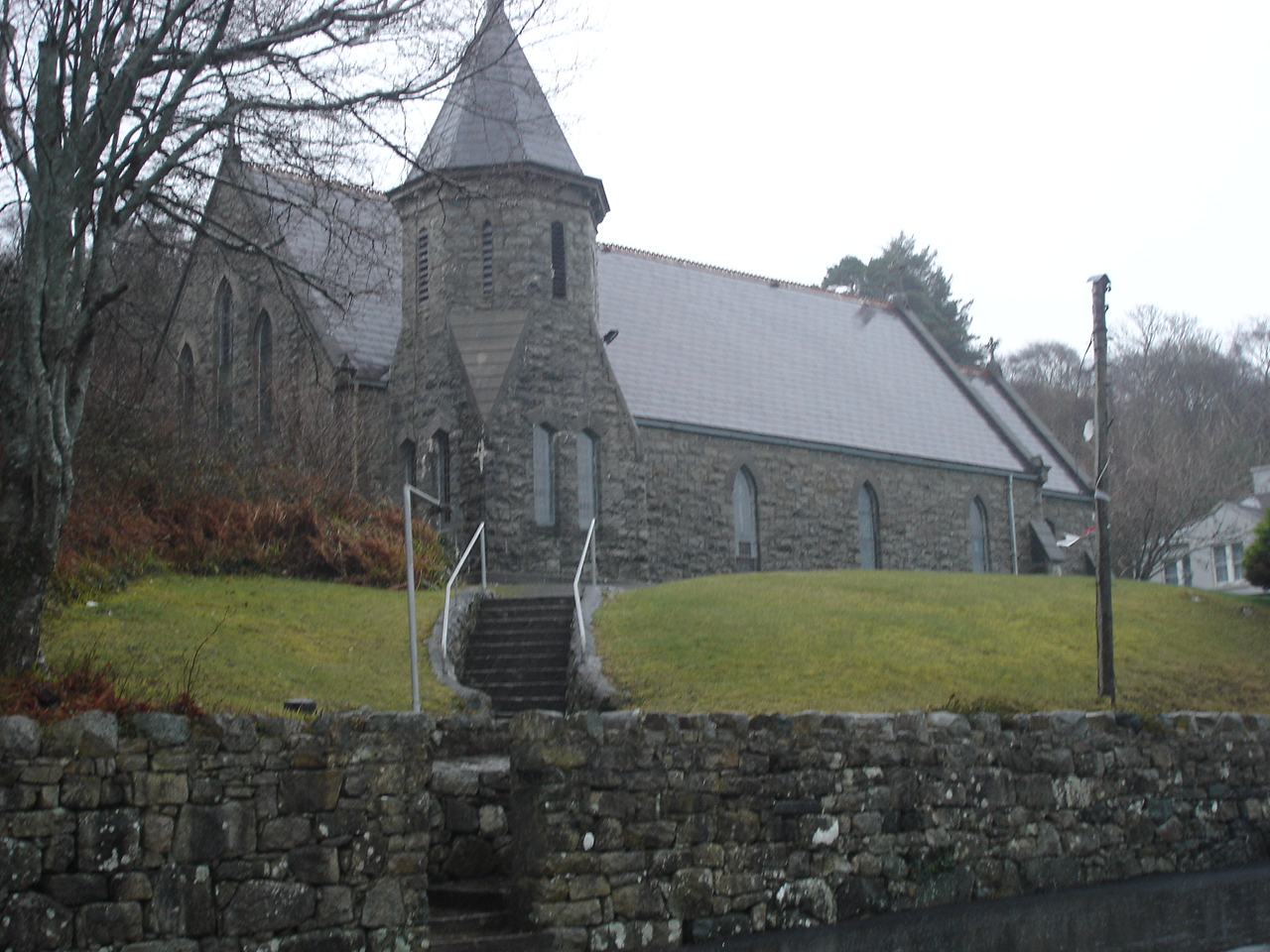
Cashel church

Cashel (Irish: an Caiseal) is a village in County Galway, in the province of Connacht, Ireland. It is located west of Galway city and southeast of Clifden, on the coast.

== History ==
The name Cashel derives from the Irish Caiseal, referring to the stone ringfort surrounding the old part of the cemetery in Caiseal Ard/High Cashel, whose remains lie on the slope of a mountain about 1 km north-east of the town.

To the west is Toombeola Bridge, near which are the remains of a Dominican Abbey, founded in 1427, by one of the O'Flaherty clan which held sway over Connemara until the rule of James II of England.

In 1969, Charles de Gaulle spent two weeks in Cashel, between 23 May and 3 June after he resigned the presidency of France, in Cashel House Hotel.

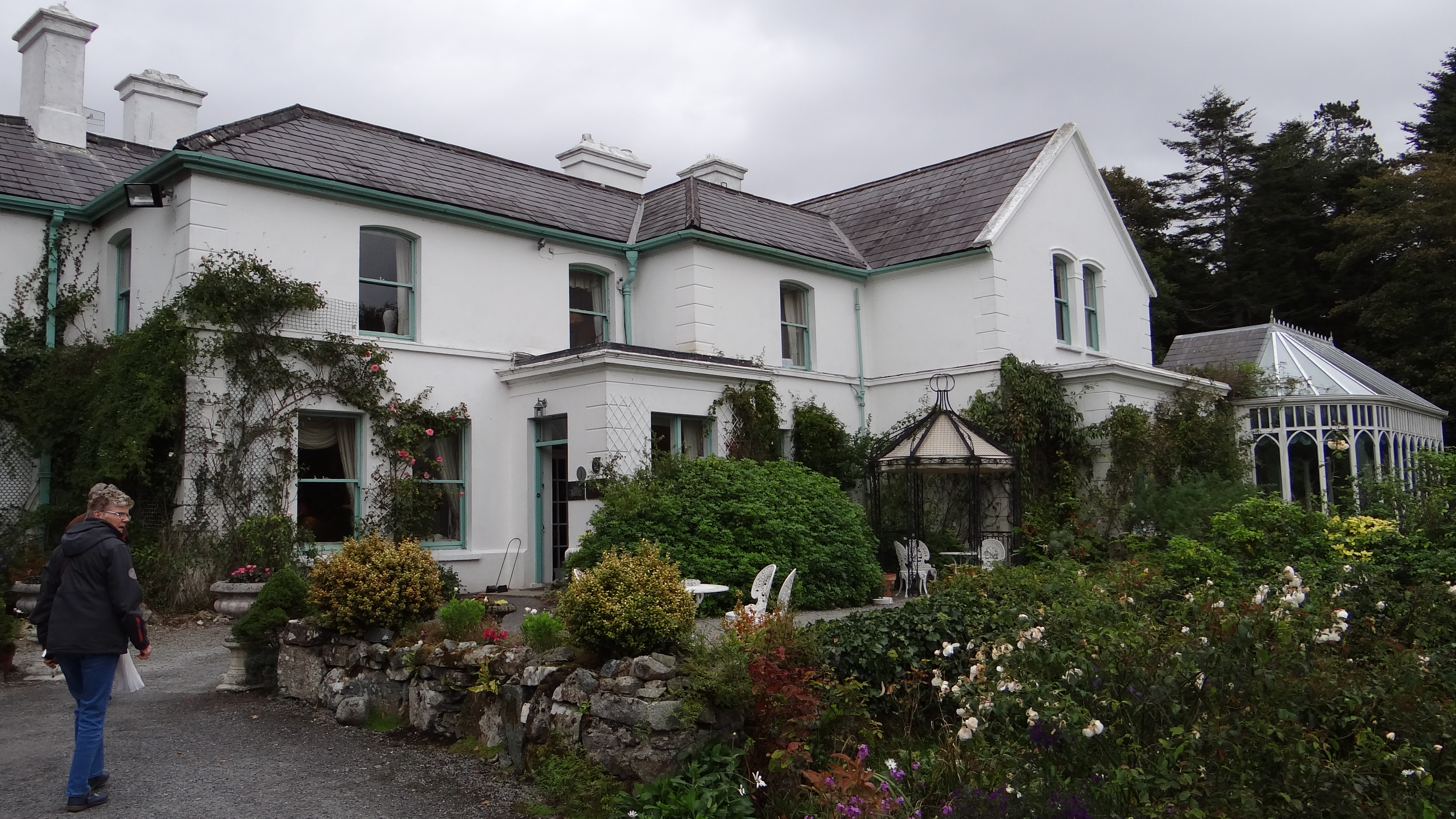
Cashel House Hotel

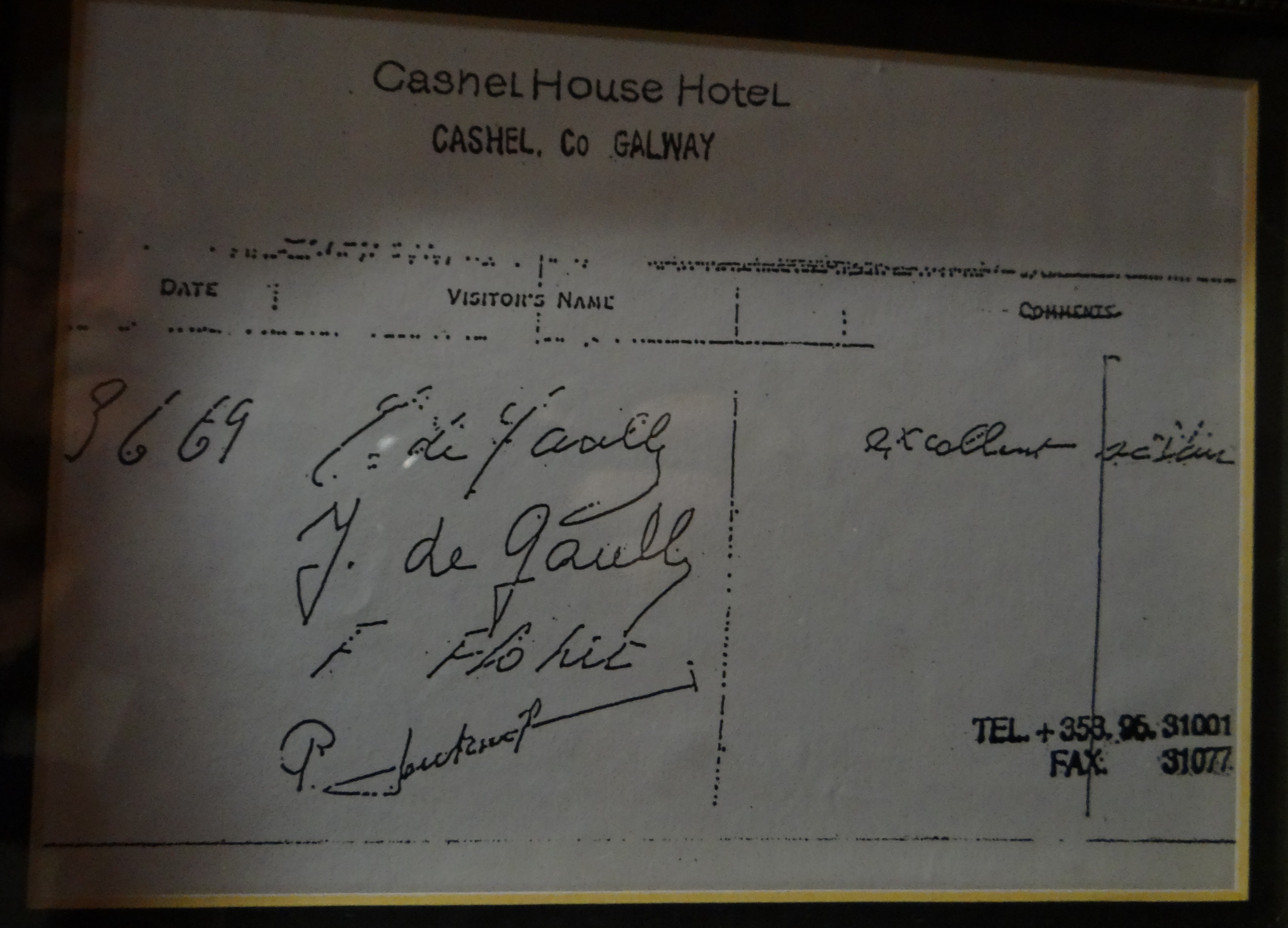
Guestbook

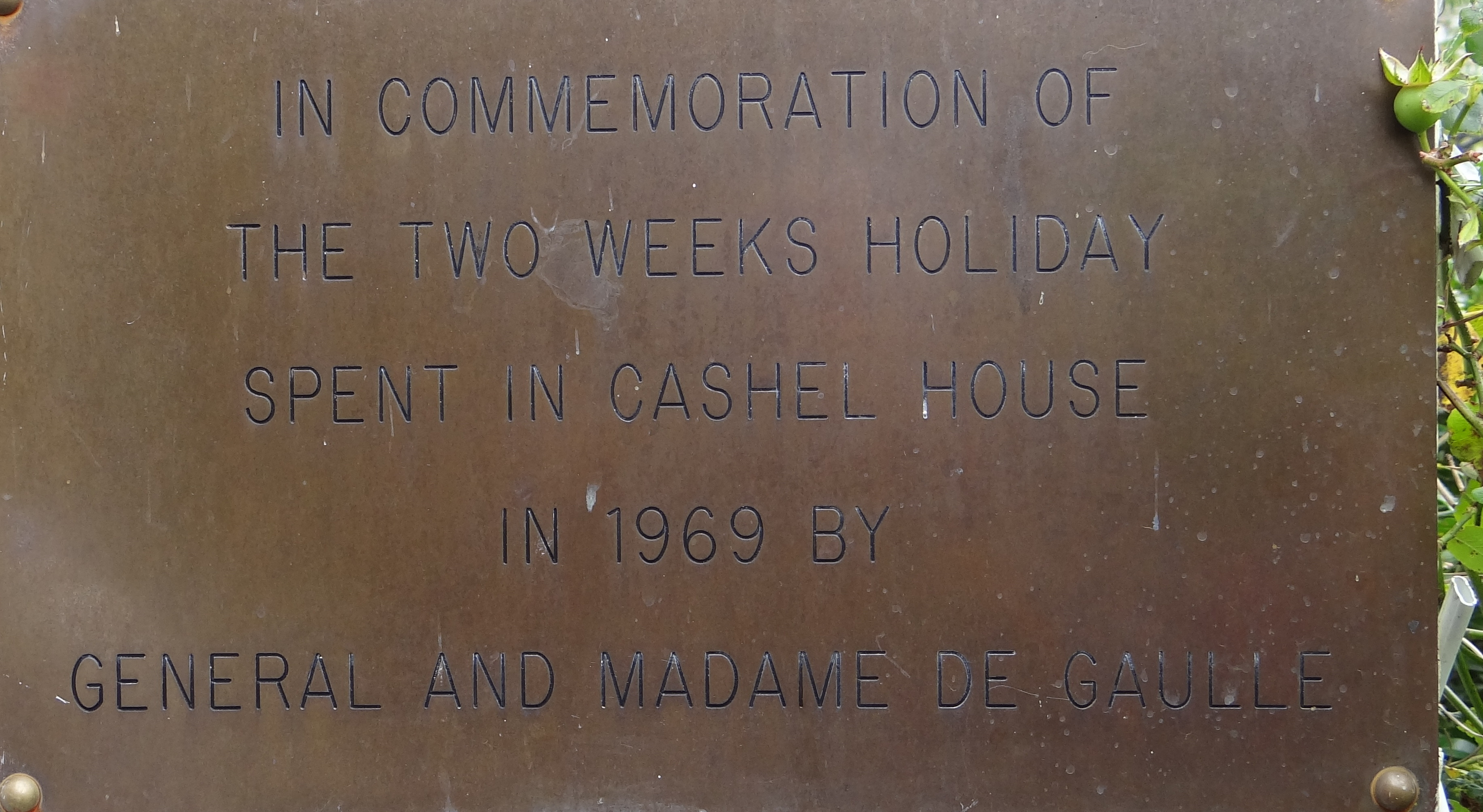
Plaque

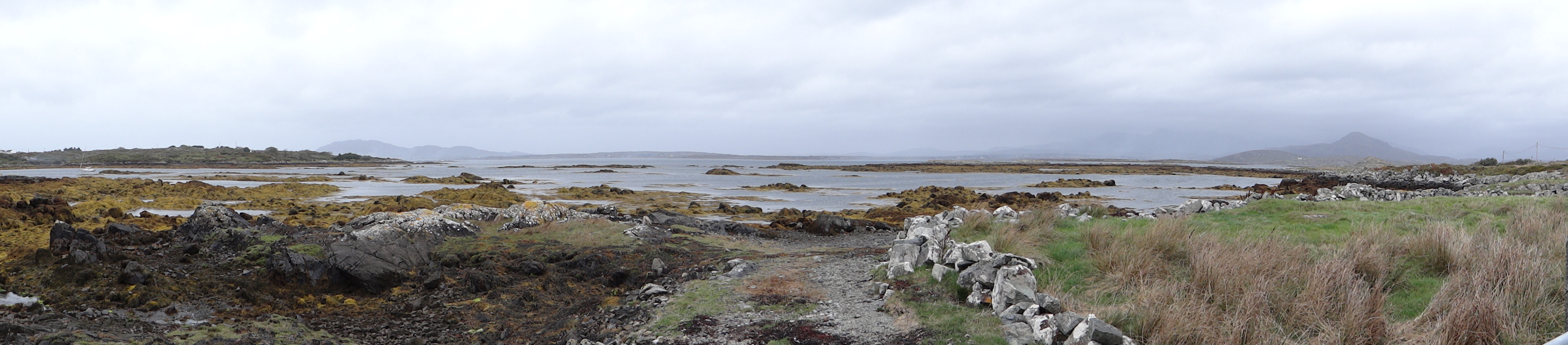
Coastal panorama
