= Robert Jocelyn, 4th Earl of Roden =

Anglo-Irish politician (1846-1880)

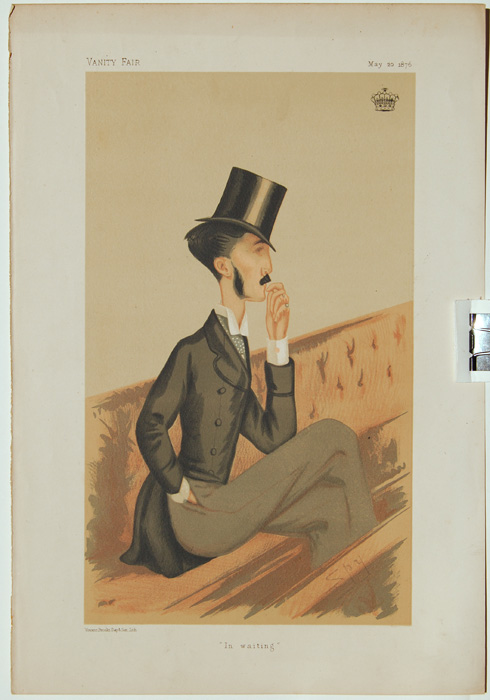
"In waiting". Caricature by Spy published in Vanity Fair in 1876.

Robert Jocelyn, 4th Earl of Roden (22 November 1846 – 10 January 1880), styled The Honourable Robert Jocelyn until 1854 and Viscount Jocelyn from 1854 to 1870, was an Anglo-Irish Conservative politician.

Roden was the eldest son of Robert Jocelyn, Viscount Jocelyn, eldest son of Robert Jocelyn, 3rd Earl of Roden. His mother was Lady Frances Elizabeth Clavering-Cowper, daughter of Peter Cowper, 5th Earl Cowper. He was educated at Eton College and Trinity College, Cambridge, graduating B.A. in 1868. He gained the courtesy title of Viscount Jocelyn on his father's death in 1854.

By 1876, as reported in his Vanity Fair Caricature text he had already retired from the Life Guards.

Jocelyn succeeded his grandfather in the earldom in 1870. In 1874 he was appointed a Lord-in-waiting (government whip in the House of Lords) in the second Conservative administration of Benjamin Disraeli, a post he held until 1880.

Lord Roden died in office in January 1880, aged only 33. He was unmarried and was succeeded in the earldom by his uncle, the Honourable John Strange Jocelyn, 5th Earl of Roden.

== Notes ==
Peerage of Ireland
Preceded by Robert Jocelyn	Earl of Roden; 1870–1880	Succeeded by John Strange Jocelyn
Peerage of the United Kingdom
Preceded by Robert Jocelyn	Baron Clanbrassil; 1870–1880	Succeeded by John Strange Jocelyn
