= Robert Jocelyn, 2nd Earl of Roden =

Irish soldier, peer and politician

The Right Honourable Robert Jocelyn KP PC (Ire)
- The Earl of Roden
- Tenure: 1797–1820
- Predecessor: Robert Jocelyn, 1st Earl of Roden
- Successor: Robert Jocelyn, 3rd Earl of Roden
- Born: 26 October 1756
- Died: 29 June 1820 (aged 63)
- Spouses: Frances Theodosia Bligh (m. 1788; died 1802) Julianna-Anne Orde (m. 1804)
- Issue: Robert Jocelyn, 3rd Earl of Roden; Hon. James Jocelyn; Hon. Thomas Jocelyn; Hon. George Jocelyn; Lady Frances Jocelyn; Lady Anne Jocelyn; Hon. John Jocelyn; Maj. Hon. Augustus Jocelyn
- Father: Robert Jocelyn, 1st Earl of Roden
- Mother: Lady Anne Hamilton

Robert Jocelyn, 2nd Earl of Roden KP, PC (Ire) (26 October 1756 – 29 June 1820) was an Irish peer, soldier and politician. He was styled The Honourable from his birth to 1771, and then Viscount Jocelyn from 1771 to 1797. He was the eldest son of the 1st Earl of Roden and Lady Anne Hamilton, daughter of James Hamilton, 1st Earl of Clanbrassil.

He was a professional soldier, and the company of dragoons he commanded, nicknamed "the Foxhunters", gained much notoriety during the Irish Rebellion of 1798. In particular, they played a leading role in the Gibbet Rath massacre at the Curragh of Kildare on 29 May 1798, where 350–500 insurgents, who had surrendered, were killed in cold blood. In defence of Roden it can be said that he acted on the orders of his superior officer, General Duff, and that the action was widely condoned at the time. In September his dragoons played a crucial part in the final defeat of the invading French army at the Battle of Ballinamuck: Lord Roden accepted the surrender of General Humbert.

He became Earl of Roden in 1797 after the death of his father Robert Jocelyn, 1st Earl of Roden and was appointed a Knight of the Order of St Patrick on 13 November 1806. Jocelyn represented Maryborough in the Irish House of Commons between 1776 and 1778. Between 1783 and 1797, he sat as Member of Parliament for Dundalk, with his brother George serving as the other Member. He turned down a Marquisate due to the lack of his fortune which was needed to uphold this position.

Following the implementation of the Acts of Union 1800 he was elected as one of the original 28 Irish representative peers and took his seat in the House of Lords. He was appointed Custos Rotulorum of Louth for life in 1820.

== Family ==
He married:

1. Frances Theodosia Bligh (died 1802), daughter of the Right Reverend Robert Bligh, Dean of Elphin and Frances Winthrop, on 5 February 1788 at St Andrew's Church, Dublin with issue:
  1. Robert Jocelyn, 3rd Earl of Roden (27 October 1788 – 20 March 1870)
  2. James Bligh Jocelyn (died July 1812)
  3. Thomas Jocelyn (died February 1816)
  4. George Jocelyn
  5. Frances Theodosia Jocelyn (1795 – May 1820), married Richard Wingfield, 5th Viscount Powerscourt
  6. Anne Jocelyn (died October 1822)
2. Juliana-Anne Orde, daughter of John Orde of Weetwood Hall, on 5 July 1804, Edinburgh, with issue:
  1. John Jocelyn (1805–1869)
  2. Major Augustus George Frederick Jocelyn (1811–1887)

Parliament of Ireland
Preceded by Sir John Parnell, 1st Bt; Hunt Walsh	Member of Parliament for Maryborough; 1776–1778; With: Sir John Parnell, 1st Bt	Succeeded by Sir John Parnell, 1st Bt; John Tydd
Preceded by William Conyngham; Robert Lindsay	Member of Parliament for Dundalk; 1783–1797; With: Hon. George Jocelyn	Succeeded by Hon. George Jocelyn; John Jocelyn
Peerage of Ireland
Preceded by Robert Jocelyn	Earl of Roden; 1797–1820	Succeeded by Robert Jocelyn
Parliament of the United Kingdom
New title	Representative peer for Ireland; 1800–1820	Succeeded by The Lord Dufferin and Claneboye
