= Robert Jocelyn, Viscount Jocelyn =

British soldier & politician (1816-1854)

Viscount Jocelyn
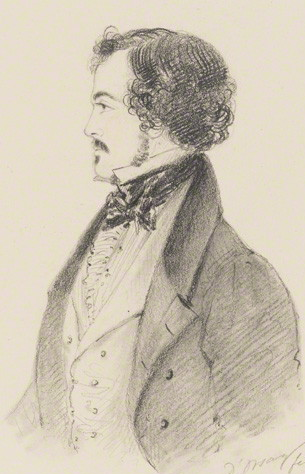
- Lord Jocelyn, 1838
- Born: 20 February 1816; Carlton Gardens, London, England
- Died: 12 August 1854 (aged 38); London, England
- Occupations: Politician, soldier
- Political party: Conservative
- Spouse: Lady Frances Cowper
- Children: Robert Jocelyn, 4th Earl of Roden

Robert Jocelyn, Viscount Jocelyn (20 February 1816 – 12 August 1854), was a British soldier and Conservative politician.

== Background ==
Born at Carlton Gardens, London, Jocelyn was the eldest son and heir apparent of Robert Jocelyn, 3rd Earl of Roden, and the Hon. Maria Frances Catherine, daughter of Thomas Stapleton, 12th Baron le Despencer.

== Military career ==
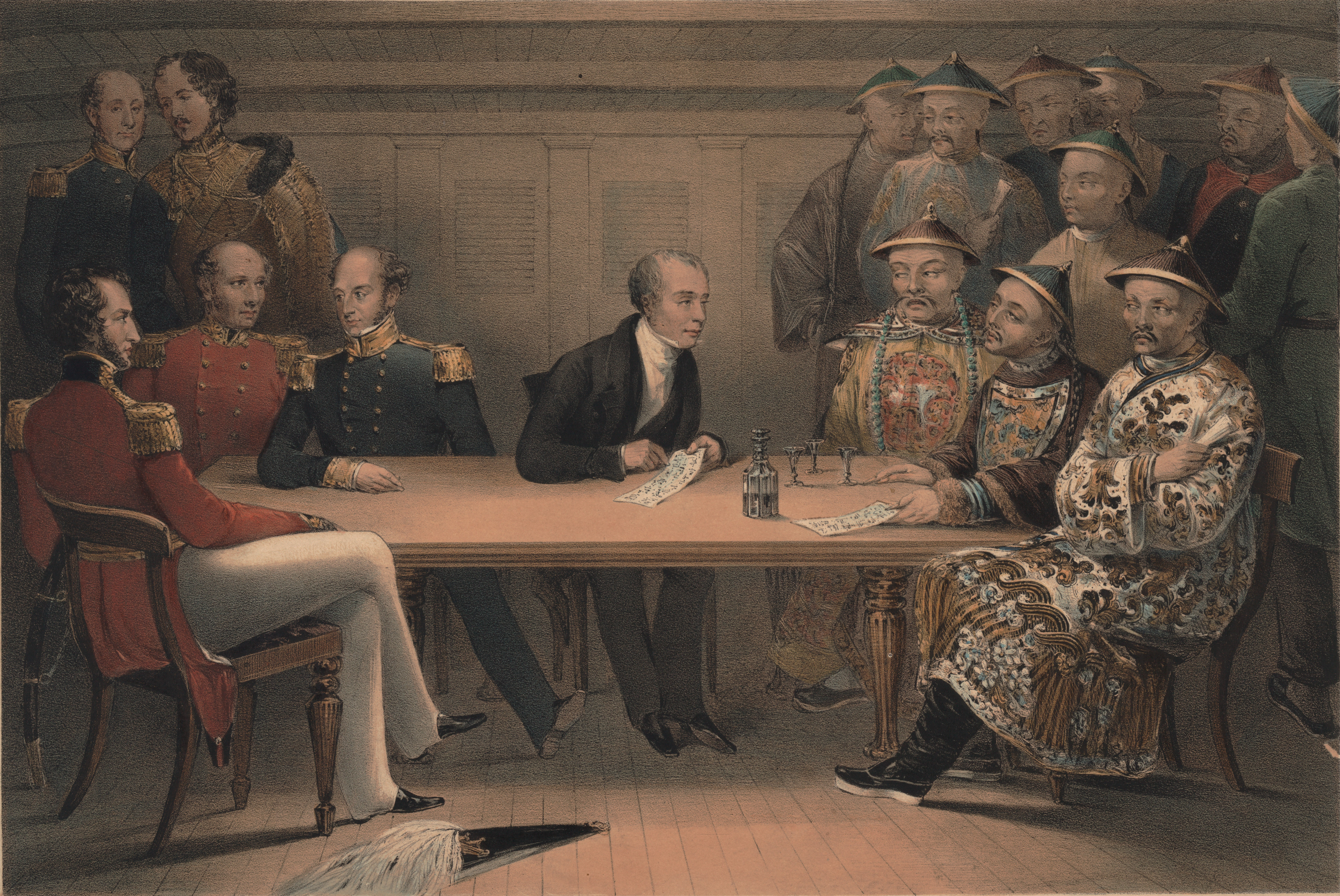
Lord Jocelyn (standing second from left) in a conference between British and Chinese officials on board HMS Wellesley on 4 July 1840

Jocelyn served in the First Opium War as Military Secretary to Lord Saltoun. He published two works on his experiences of the conflict. In 1853 he was appointed Lieutenant-Colonel Commandant of the East Sussex Militia.

== Political career ==
Jocelyn was member of parliament for King's Lynn from 1842 to 1854. He served under Sir Robert Peel as Joint Secretary to the Board of Control between 1845 and 1846.

== Family ==
Lord Jocelyn married Lady Frances Elizabeth, daughter of Peter Clavering-Cowper, 5th Earl Cowper and Emily Lamb, in 1841. They had several children. In 1854, while his regiment, the East Essex Militia, was quartered in the Tower of London, he contracted cholera and died in London in August of that year, aged 38, predeceasing his father by 16 years. His eldest son Robert later succeeded in the earldom. Lady Jocelyn died in March 1880.

== Works ==
- Jocelyn, Robert (1841). Six Months with the Chinese Expedition; or, Leaves from a Soldier's Note-book (2nd ed.). London: John Murray.

Parliament of the United Kingdom
Preceded by Lord George Bentinck; Sir Stratford Canning	Member of Parliament for King's Lynn; 1842–1854; With: Lord George Bentinck 1842–1848; Lord Stanley 1848–1854	Succeeded by Lord Stanley; John Henry Gurney
Political offices
Preceded by James Emerson Tennent; Hon. Bingham Baring	Joint Secretary to the Board of Control; James Emerson Tennent 1845; Viscount Mahon 1845–1846; 1845–1846	Succeeded by Hon. George Byng; Thomas Wyse
