= Robert Jocelyn, 3rd Earl of Roden =

Irish Tory politician and knight

The Right Honourable The Earl of Roden KP PC PC (Ire)
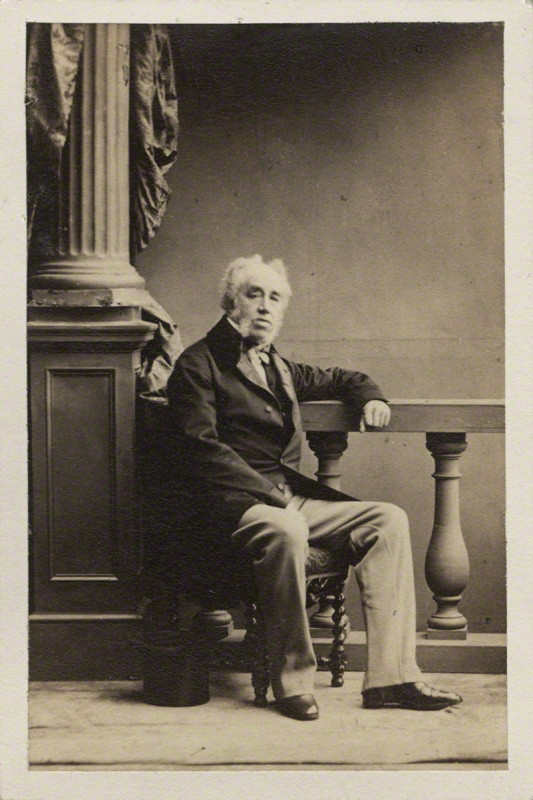

Treasurer of the Household
- In office March 1812 – 29 July 1812
- Monarch: George III
- Prime Minister: Spencer Perceval; The Earl of Liverpool
- Preceded by: The Earl of Courtown
- Succeeded by: Lord Charles Bentinck

Vice-Chamberlain of the Household
- In office 28 July 1812 – 9 April 1827
- Monarchs: George III; George IV
- Prime Minister: The Earl of Liverpool
- Preceded by: Earl of Yarmouth
- Succeeded by: Marquess of Graham

Personal details
- Born: 27 October 1788
- Died: 20 March 1870 (aged 81) Edinburgh, Scotland
- Party: Tory
- Spouses: Hon. Maria Stapleton (m. 1813; died 1861) Clementina Reilly (m. 1862)
- Children: Elizabeth Stewart, Marchioness of Londonderry; Frances Noel, Countess of Gainsborough; Lady Maria Weld Forester; Robert Jocelyn, Viscount Jocelyn; John Strange Jocelyn, 5th Earl of Roden; Hon. William Nassau Jocelyn

Robert Jocelyn, 3rd Earl of Roden, KP PC PC (Ire) (27 October 1788 – 20 March 1870), styled Viscount Jocelyn between 1797 and 1820, was an Irish Tory politician and supporter of Protestant causes.

== Background ==
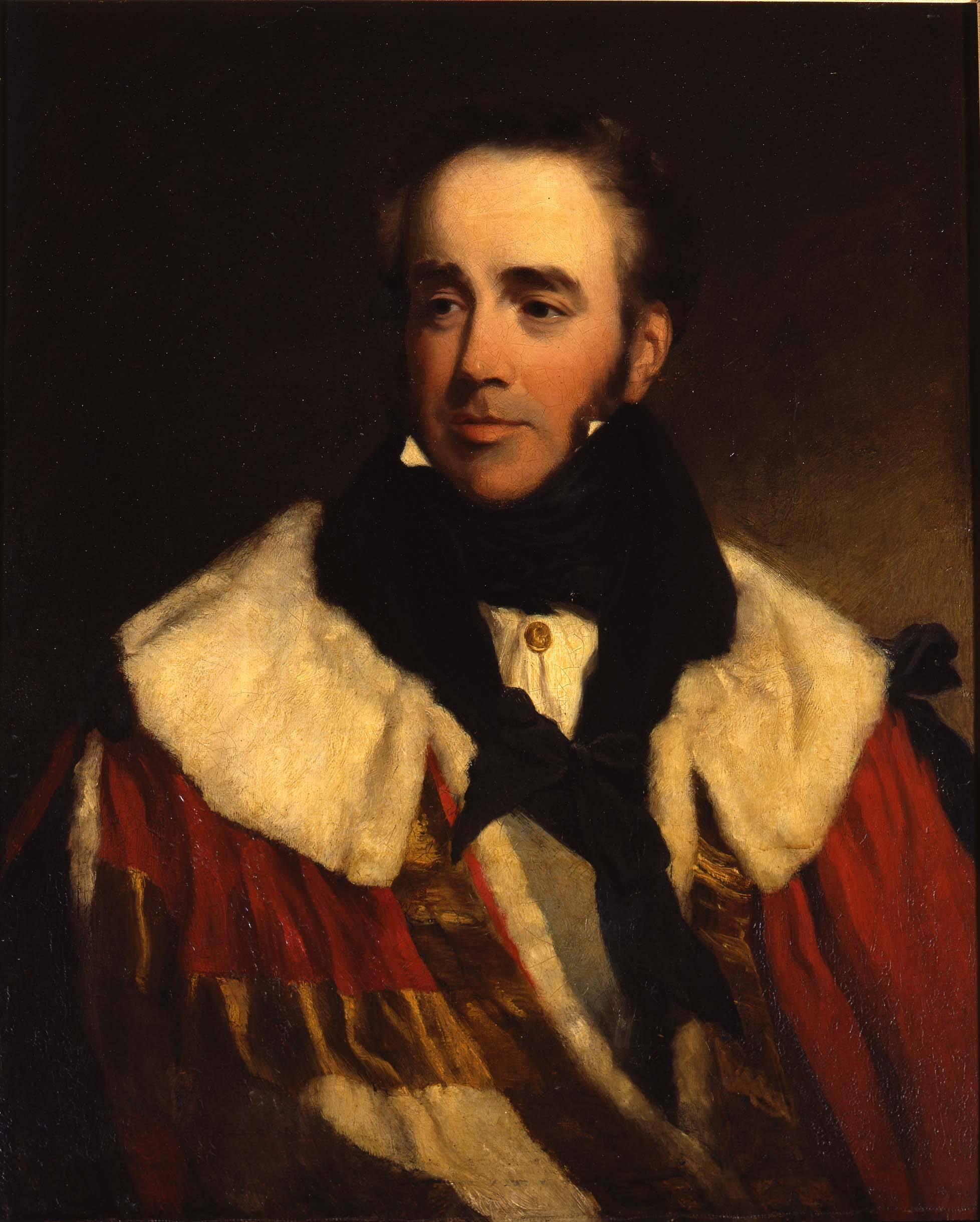
The 3rd Earl of Roden, painted by Frederick Richard Say, c. 1830.

Jocelyn was the son of Robert Jocelyn, 2nd Earl of Roden, and his first wife Frances Theodosia, daughter of the Very Reverend Robert Bligh, Dean of Elphin.

== Political career ==
An ardent conservative, Jocelyn was Member of Parliament for County Louth from 1806 to 1807 and again from 1810 to 1820, when he succeeded his father in the earldom. In March 1812 he was sworn of the Privy Council and appointed Treasurer of the Household under Spencer Perceval, an office he retained when Lord Liverpool became Prime Minister in June 1812 after Perceval's assassination. In July 1812 he was made Vice-Chamberlain of the Household, a post he held until the Liverpool administration fell in 1827.

In 1821 he was created Baron Clanbrassil, of Hyde Hall in the County of Hertford and Dundalk in the County of Louth, in the Peerage of the United Kingdom, which entitled him to an automatic seat in the House of Lords. The same year, on 20 August 1821, he was also appointed a Knight of the Order of St Patrick. In 1858 he was sworn of the Irish Privy Council.

== Supporter of Protestant causes ==
Despite Lord Roden's political career, he is best remembered for his strong support for Protestant causes in the north of Ireland and elsewhere. He supported religious societies such as the Hibernian Bible Society, the Sunday School Society, the Evangelical Alliance and the Protestant Orphan Society, and also conducted service in the private chapel at Tullymore Park, Castlewellan, County Down, his chief residence in Ireland. He was an important leader in the Orange Order, eventually rising to the rank of Grand Master, and was described as a "diehard Unionist".

However, in 1849 a clash took part between Orangeman and Roman Catholics at Dolly's Brae, near Castlewellan, in which several people were killed after he had invited the Orangemen onto his estate and addressed them, urging them to "do their duty as loyal, Protestant men". A commission was set up to examine the event, and severely criticised Roden for his conduct. As a result of this, he was removed from his position as a member of the Commission of the Peace.

== Family ==
Lord Roden was twice married. He married firstly the Hon. Maria Frances Catherine (c. 1793 – 25 February 1861), daughter of Thomas Stapleton, 12th Baron le Despencer, on 9 January 1813. They had three sons and three daughters.

- Lady Elizabeth Frances Charlotte Jocelyn (died 2 September 1884); married, firstly, on 25 January 1836, Richard Wingfield, 6th Viscount Powerscourt, and had issue. She married, secondly, on 30 April 1846, Frederick Stewart, 4th Marquess of Londonderry, no issue.
- Lady Frances Jocelyn (d. 12 May 1885); married Charles Noel, 1st Earl of Gainsborough, on 25 July 1833; has issue. She served as Lady of the Bedchamber to Queen Victoria.
- Lady Maria Jocelyn (d. 17 March 1894); married on 11 June 1848 Hon. Charles Robert Weld Forester, son of Cecil Weld-Forester, 1st Baron Forester; no issue.
- Robert Jocelyn, Viscount Jocelyn (20 February 1816 – 12 August 1854); married on 9 April 1841 Lady Frances Elizabeth Cowper, daughter of Peter Cowper, 5th Earl Cowper; had issue. Lord Jocelyn predeceased his father, and so Lord Jocelyn's eldest son, Robert, succeeded his grandfather to the earldom. However, as Robert died unmarried and without issue, the title next passed to his uncle.
- John Strange Jocelyn, 5th Earl of Roden (5 June 1823 – 3 July 1897); married 31 July 1851 Hon. Sophia Hobhouse, daughter of John John Hobhouse, 1st Baron Broughton. The couple had one daughter, and so the earldom passed to William Henry Jocelyn, a grandson of the 2nd Earl of Roden and his second wife.
- Hon. William Nassau Jocelyn (23 October 1832 – 11 November 1892); married Cecilia Mary Elliot on 11 October 1866; no issue.

Lord Roden's eldest son, Robert Jocelyn, Viscount Jocelyn, was also a politician, but predeceased his father. After Roden's first wife's death on 25 February 1861, he married secondly Clementina Janet, daughter of Thomas Andrews, of Greenknowes, and widow of Captain Robert Lushington Reilly, of Scarva, County Down, on 16 August 1862. They had no children. In later life Lord Roden spent time in Edinburgh, Scotland, to improve his health. He died there in March 1870, aged 81, and was succeeded in the earldom by his grandson Robert, son of the late Viscount Jocelyn. The Countess of Roden died on 9 July 1903.

Parliament of the United Kingdom
Preceded by John Foster; William Charles Fortescue	Member of Parliament for County Louth; 1806–1807; With: John Foster	Succeeded by John Foster; John Jocelyn
Preceded by John Foster; John Jocelyn	Member of Parliament for County Louth; 1810–1820; With: John Foster	Succeeded by John Foster; John Jocelyn
Political offices
Preceded by The Earl of Courtown	Treasurer of the Household; 1812	Succeeded by Lord Charles Bentinck
Preceded by Earl of Yarmouth	Vice-Chamberlain of the Household; 1812–1827	Succeeded by Marquess of Graham
Honorary titles
Preceded by The Viscount Palmerston	Senior Privy Counsellor; 1865–1870	Succeeded by The Viscount Stratford de Redcliffe
Peerage of Ireland
Preceded by Robert Jocelyn	Earl of Roden; 1820–1870	Succeeded by Robert Jocelyn
Peerage of the United Kingdom
New creation	Baron Clanbrassil; 1821–1870	Succeeded by Robert Jocelyn
