= William de Burgh (MP) =

Anglo-Irish politician and theological writer (1741–1808)

William de Burgh DCL

Member of Parliament for Athy
- In office 1769–1776 Serving with Walter Hussey Burgh
- Preceded by: Robert Sandford; William Smith
- Succeeded by: Thomas Burgh; Thomas Burgh (1744–1810)

Personal details
- Born: 1741 County Kildare, Ireland
- Died: 1808 (aged 66–67) York, England
- Resting place: York Minster, York
- Spouse: Mary Warburton (m. 1768)
- Parents: Thomas Burgh of Bert; Anne Downes
- Relatives: Margaretta Foster, 1st Viscountess Ferrard (sister); Walter Hussey Burgh (brother-in-law); Ulysses Burgh, 2nd Baron Downes (nephew); Dive Downes (grandfather)
- Education: Trinity College, Dublin

William de Burgh (English: /dəˈbɜːr/ də-BUR; 1741 – 1808) was a prominent Anglo-Irish politician and theological writer who was a Member of Parliament for Athy (1769–76), a supporter of William Wilberforce, and an active campaigner for the abolition of slavery.

== Descent ==
William Burgh, or de Burgh, was born in 1741 to Thomas Burgh of Bert (1696–1754), Member of Parliament for Lanesborough and landowner in County Kildare, Ireland, and his wife Anne Downes (1709–1801), whom he married in 1731. Anne was the daughter of Dive Downes (1653–1709), Bishop of Cork and Ross, and Catherine Fitzgerald, daughter of Robert FitzGerald and granddaughter of George FitzGerald, 16th Earl of Kildare. William's grandfather, William de Burgh of Bert MP (died 1744) was Comptroller and Accountant-General for Ireland, and a brother of the prominent architect, Colonel Thomas de Burgh of Oldtown, MP (who built Trinity College Library, Dublin). The family were descendants of William de Burgh (c.1160–1206), founder of the House of Burgh, who first settled in Ireland in 1185.

== Education ==
De Burgh was educated at Trinity College, Dublin.

== Career ==
De Burgh began his political career by representing the borough of Athy, Kildare, in the Irish parliament of 1769–76. A keen supporter of liberty of political expression, he was to become a leading figure in the York association for parliamentary reform. From the outset, however, he displayed his opposition to the ideas of the French Revolution, and although this gained him favour with his friend Edmund Burke, it brought him little initial popularity. He was vindicated when the later bloodshed of the revolution brought public opinion around.

Like his brother-in-law, Walter Hussey Burgh, he was opposed to the war in America. A close friend of William Wilberforce, the leading light of the movement for the abolition of slavery, de Burgh enthusiastically supported the campaign.

As a theologian, de Burgh is best known for his defence of the doctrine of the Trinity against Socinianism. A series of intellectual battles with the Rev. Theophilus Lindsey resulted in the publication of A scriptural confutation of the arguments against the one Godhead of the Father, Son, and Holy Ghost produced by the Rev. Mr Lindsay in 1774, and An inquiry into the belief of the Christians of the first three centuries representing the one Godhead of Father, Son, and Holy Ghost, published in York in 1778. Much criticised by anti-trinitarians, his writings received the approval and support of many distinguished laymen, including his friend Edmund Burke, and leading churchmen of the day who included Thomas Newton, Bishop of Bristol. His orthodox theological studies led to the award of a DCL by the University of Oxford in 1788.

== Family ==
Burgh was married to Mary (died 1819), daughter of George Warburton on 25 June 1768, another Irish landowning family. She survived him by 11 years. Although William de Burgh owned considerable estates in Ireland, he lived most of his life in York and was buried in York Minster. In accordance with his will, 328 volumes were bequeathed to the Library at York Minster.

Wiliam's brother, Thomas de Burgh (1741–1810) was also a Member of Parliament and went on to become Accountant-General for Ireland. Thomas' son was General Ulysses de Burgh, 2nd Baron Downes, GCB (1788–1863), a well-known officer in the Peninsular War and aide-de-camp to the Duke of Wellington.

William's two sisters both married prominent politicians. Margaret Amelia (died 1824) married John Foster, Lord Oriel, speaker of the Irish House of Commons, and was created Viscountess Ferrard in 1797. Anne (died 1782) married Rt Hon Walter Hussey Burgh MP PC (1742–1783), Chief Baron of the Irish Exchequer and campaigner for Irish Independence.

== See also ==
- House of Burgh, an Anglo-Norman and Hiberno-Norman dynasty founded in 1193

Parliament of Ireland
Preceded by Robert Sandford; William Smith	Member of Parliament for Athy; 1769–1776; With: Walter Hussey Burgh	Succeeded by Thomas Burgh; Thomas Burgh (1744–1810)
