= John Foster, 1st Baron Oriel =

Anglo-Irish politician (1740–1828)

The Right Honourable The Lord Oriel PC (Ire)
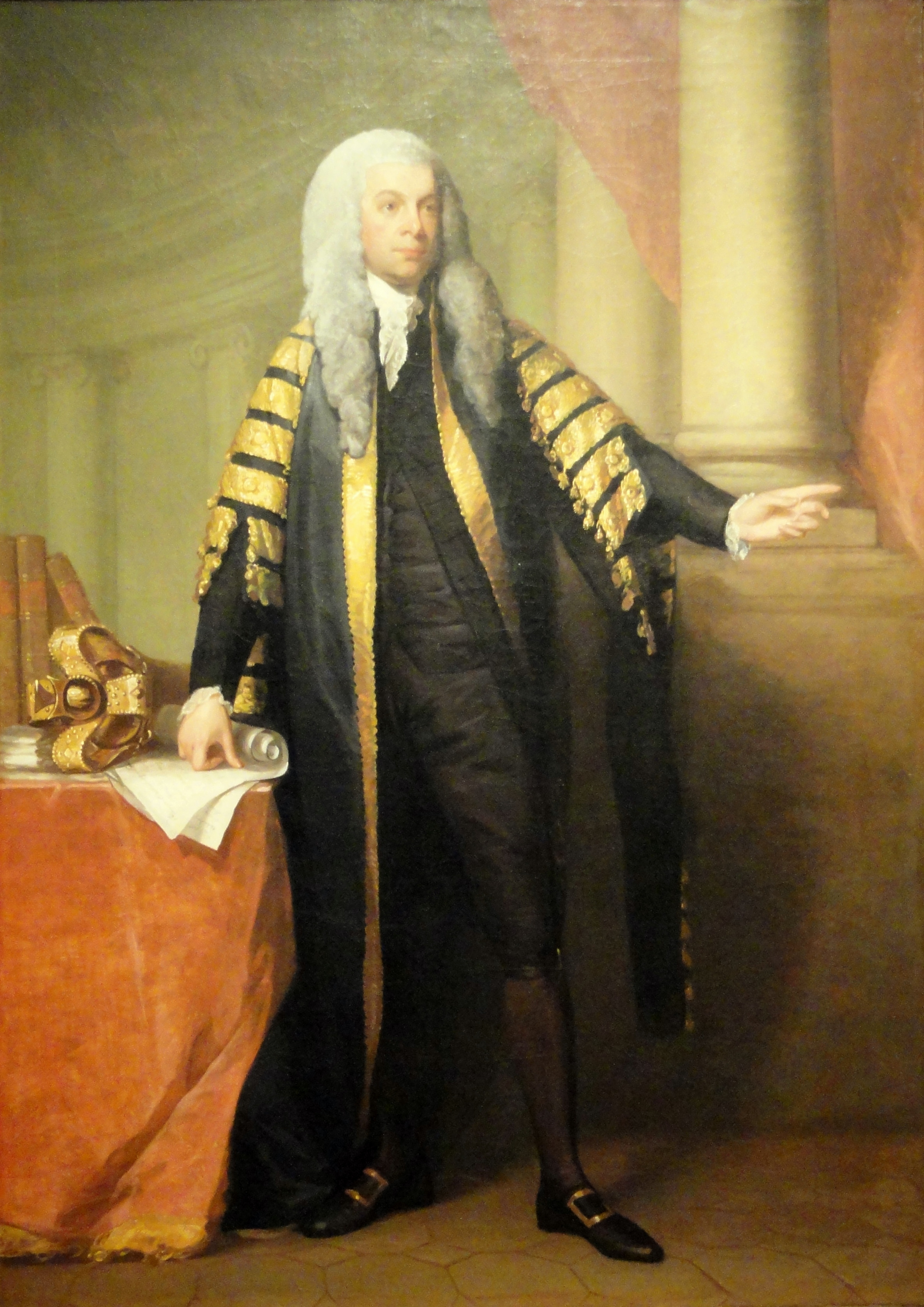
- Portrait by Gilbert Stuart, c. 1790–1791

Chancellor of the Exchequer of Ireland
- In office 30 April 1807 – 1811
- Monarch: George III
- Prime Minister: The Duke of Portland
- Preceded by: Sir John Newport, Bt
- Succeeded by: William Wellesley-Pole
- In office 9 July 1804 – 24 February 1806
- Prime Minister: William Pitt the Younger
- Preceded by: Isaac Corry
- Succeeded by: Sir John Newport, 1st Baronet
- In office 23 April 1784 – 17 September 1785
- Preceded by: George Ponsonby
- Succeeded by: Sir John Parnell, 2nd Baronet

Speaker of the Irish House of Commons
- In office 1785–1800
- Monarch: George III
- Preceded by: Edmund Pery
- Succeeded by: Office abolished (Cathal Brugha as Ceann Comhairle)

Personal details
- Born: 1740
- Died: 23 August 1828 (aged 87–88)
- Spouse: Margaretta Amelia Foster (m. 1764; died 1824)

John Foster, 1st Baron Oriel PC (Ire) (1740 – 23 August 1828) was an Anglo-Irish politician who thrice served as Chancellor of the Exchequer of Ireland and also served as the last speaker of the Irish House of Commons.

== Early life ==
He was the son of Anthony Foster of Dunleer, County Louth, Chief Baron of the Irish Exchequer (himself the son of John Foster, MP for Dunleer) by his first wife Elizabeth Burgh. Foster lived in Merville, now part of the University College Dublin Campus in Clonskeagh, which came into his ownership in 1778. He also inherited Collon House in County Louth from his father, and made extensive improvements to the house and grounds; Collon was famous for its variety of trees and shrubs.

== Political career ==
He was elected Member of Parliament (MP) to the Irish House of Commons for Dunleer in 1761, a seat he held until 1769. He made his mark in financial and commercial questions, being appointed Irish Chancellor of the Exchequer in 1784. His law giving bounties on the exportation of corn and imposing heavy taxes on its importation is noted by William Lecky as being largely responsible for making Ireland an arable instead of a pasture country. In 1785 he became the last Speaker of the Irish House of Commons.

In 1768, Foster was elected for Navan and in 1783 for Sligo. Both times he had also stood for County Louth, which constituency he then chose to represent. He held this seat until the Act of Union in 1801, which he opposed.

It was said by his critics that his opposition to the Union was less political than personal; summoned to London for consultations, he found himself treated with contempt by the English officials he dealt with, who mocked his broad Irish accent and called him "Mister Spaker". On returning to Ireland he launched a campaign of opposition to the Union. He ultimately refused to surrender the Speaker's mace, which was kept by his family and is now on display in the Parliament House, Dublin (now the Bank of Ireland).

He served as Custos Rotulorum of Louth from 1798 to 1801 and Governor of Louth from 1798 to his death.

Foster was returned in 1801 to the new United Kingdom parliament as a member for County Louth, and from 1804 to 1806 was Irish Chancellor of the Exchequer under Pitt.

From 1807 to 1813 he was second Commissioner in the Irish Treasury and from 1807 to 1812 one of the Lord Commissioners of the UK Treasury.

In 1821 he has created a peer of the United Kingdom as Baron Oriel, of Ferrard, in the County of Louth, and died on 23 August 1828.

Foster Place was named for him in the 1780s by the Wide Streets Commissioners while slightly later the Foster Aqueduct on the north side of the city was also named for him.

== Family ==
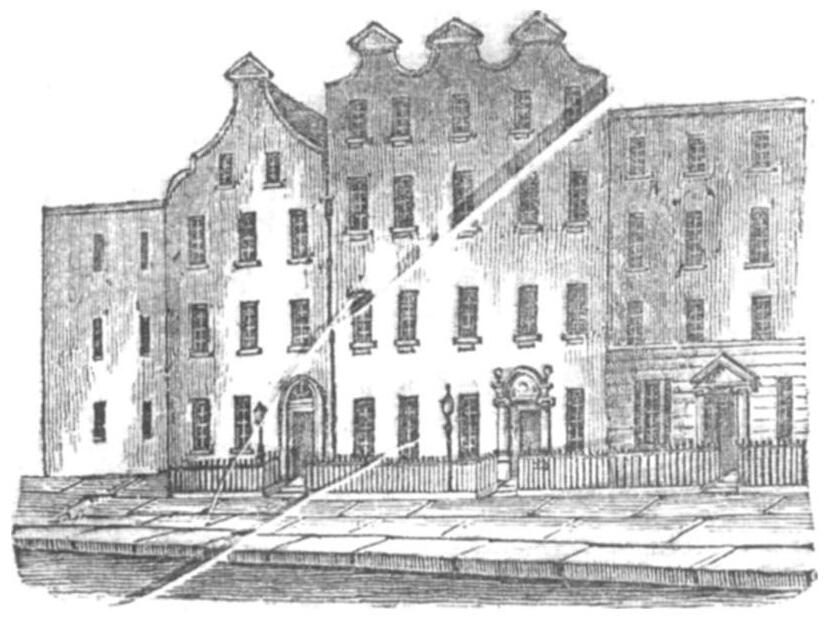
Home of John Foster on Molesworth Street - centre with three gables.

In 1764, he married Margaretta Amelia Burgh, daughter of Thomas Burgh, MP for Lanesborough, and his wife Anne Downes, daughter of Dive Downes, Bishop of Cork and Ross. John and Margaretta had two sons and a daughter.

His elder son, John Foster, was MP for Dunleer 1790–92 and died without issue before 18 April 1792. That John should not be confused with his cousin John William Foster, MP for Dunleer 1783–90.

His wife (died 1824) had in 1790 been created an Irish peeress, as Baroness Oriel, and in 1797 Viscountess Ferrard. Their younger son, Thomas Henry (1772–1843), who married Harriet Skeffington, Viscountess Massereene in her own right, and took the name of Skeffington, inherited all these titles; the later Viscounts Massereene being their descendants.

John and Margaretta also had a daughter, Anne, who married James Blackwood, 2nd Baron Dufferin, but had no children. She outlived her husband by many years and reached the age of 93.

One of his first cousins married Elizabeth Hervey, aka Lady Bess Foster, aka Elizabeth, Duchess of Devonshire. His younger brother was Lord Bishop Foster.

== Arms ==
Coat of arms of John Foster, 1st Baron Oriel

Motto
Divini Gloria Ruris

== Biography and letters ==
- APW Malcomson: "John Foster: The politics of the Anglo-Irish Ascendancy"; ISBN 0-19-920087-4, 504 pages, 1978 Oxford: Oxford University Press
- APW Malcomson: An Anglo-Irish Dialogue: A Calendar of the Correspondence between John Foster and Lord Sheffield 1774-1821"; ISBN 0-905691-00-8, 1975 Belfast: Public Record Office of Northern Ireland

Parliament of Ireland
Preceded by Anthony Foster; Thomas Tennison	Member of Parliament for Dunleer; 1761–1769; With: Thomas Tennison 1761–1762; Dixie Coddington 1762–1769	Succeeded by Robert Sibthorpe; Dixie Coddington
Preceded by John Preston; Joseph Preston	Member of Parliament for Navan; 1768–1769; With: Joseph Preston	Succeeded by John Preston; Joseph Preston
Preceded by Stephen Sibthorpe; James Fortescue	Member of Parliament for County Louth; 1768–1801; With: James Fortescue 1768–1782; Thomas James Fortescue 1782–1796; William Charles Fortescue 1796–1801	Succeeded by Parliament of the United Kingdom
Preceded by Richard Hely-Hutchinson; Owen Wynne	Member of Parliament for Sligo; 1783; With: Owen Wynne	Succeeded by Owen Wynne; Thomas Dawson
Parliament of the United Kingdom
New constituency	Member of Parliament for Louth; 1801–1821; With: William Charles Fortescue to 1806; Viscount Jocelyn 1806–1807; John Jocelyn 1807–1810; Viscount Jocelyn 1810–1820; John Jocelyn from August 1810	Succeeded by Thomas Skeffington and John Jocelyn
Political offices
Preceded by Sir John Newport, Bt	Chancellor of the Exchequer of Ireland; 1807–1811	Succeeded by William Wellesley-Pole
Preceded by Isaac Corry	Chancellor of the Exchequer of Ireland; 1804–1806	Succeeded by Sir John Newport, 1st Baronet
Preceded by Edmund Sexton Pery	Speaker of the Irish House of Commons; 1785–1800	Office abolished
Preceded by George Ponsonby	Chancellor of the Exchequer of Ireland; 1784–1785	Succeeded by Sir John Parnell, 2nd Baronet
Peerage of the United Kingdom
New creation	Baron Oriel; 1821–1828	Succeeded by Thomas Skeffington
