= Thomas Burgh (Lanesborough MP) =

Anglo-Irish politician (1696–1758)

Member of Parliament for Lanesborough
- In office 1727–1758 Serving with Thomas Marlay and Anthony Marlay
- Preceded by: Robert Bray; Wentworth Harman
- Succeeded by: Anthony Marlay; John Hely-Hutchinson

Personal details
- Born: Thomas Burgh; 1696
- Died: 1758 (aged 61–62)
- Spouse: Anne Downes (m. 1731)
- Children: 8, including: Margaretta Burgh
- Parents: William Burgh; Margaret Parnell
- Relatives: John Parnell (uncle); Thomas Parnell (uncle); Ulysses Burgh, 2nd Baron Downes (grandson)
- Education: Trinity College, Dublin

Thomas Burgh (1696 – 20 September 1758) was an Anglo-Irish politician who was elected MP for Lanesborough in the Irish House of Commons (1727–1758).

== Biography ==
Burgh was educated at Trinity College, Dublin.

He was the son of William Burgh of Bert House, near Athy, County Kildare, Comptroller and Auditor General, and Margaret Parnell, sister of the High Court judge John Parnell and the poet and preacher Thomas Parnell. His uncle, John, was an ancestor of the leading statesman Charles Stewart Parnell. Burgh sat in the Irish House of Commons as the Member of Parliament for Lanesborough between 1727 and his death in 1758.

== Family ==
Burgh married Anne Downes, daughter of Rt. Rev. Dive Downes, Bishop of Cork and Ross and his fourth wife Lady Catherine Fitzgerald, sister of the Earl of Kildare, in 1731. They had eight children, three sons and five daughters.

One of their daughters, Margaretta Burgh, married John Foster, 1st Baron Oriel and was created Viscountess Ferrard in 1797. Another, Catherine, married Dixie Coddington MP of Oldbridge, County Meath, but had no surviving issue.

One of their sons, also called Thomas, was the father of Ulysses Burgh, 2nd Baron Downes, who inherited the title by special remainder from his cousin William Downes, 1st Baron Downes, Lord Chief Justice of Ireland, a nephew of Anne Downes. Bert House, a substantial Palladian mansion, still exists.

== See also ==
- House of Burgh, an Anglo-Norman and Hiberno-Norman dynasty founded in 1193

Parliament of Ireland
| Preceded by Robert Bray; Wentworth Harman | Member of Parliament for Lanesborough; 1727 – 1758; With: Thomas Marlay (1727-31); Anthony Marlay (1731-58) | Succeeded by Anthony Marlay; John Hely-Hutchinson |
