= Tennison =

Tennison is a surname, and may refer to:

- Chalee Tennison (born 1969), American singer-songwriter
- Jeni Tennison (born 1972), British software engineer
- Reeth Rishya Tennison (born 1995), Indian table tennis player
- Richard Tennison (1642–1705), Church of Ireland bishop
- Rosalie Tennison (1958–2025), Canadian author and journalist
- Thomas Tennison (1707–1779), Irish politician and judge

== See also ==
- Tenison
- Tennyson (surname)
