= William Cusack =

William Cusack may refer to:

- Sir William Cusack-Smith, 2nd Baronet (1766–1836), Irish baronet, politician, and judge
- Billy Cusack (born 1966), Scottish Olympic judoka

== See also ==
- Cusack-Smith baronets
