= Tennyson (disambiguation) =

Alfred, Lord Tennyson (1809–1892), was an English poet.

Tennyson may also refer to:

== Art, entertainment, and media ==
=== Characters ===
- Ambrose Tennyson, a character in the novel The Mating Season by PG Wodehouse
- Ben Tennyson, the primary protagonist of the Ben 10 media franchise
- Gwen Tennyson, the secondary protagonist of the Ben 10 media franchise

=== Music ===
- Tennyson (band), Canadian duo band

== People ==
- Tennyson (surname)
- Baron Tennyson, the barony itself
- Tennyson Bardwell, American film and TV commercial director and screenwriter
- Tennyson Cooray (1952–2020), Sri Lankan actor and comedian
- Tennyson Guyer (1912–1981), member of the United States House of Representatives
- Frederick Tennyson Congdon (1858–1932), Canadian politician and lawyer
- Alfred D'Orsay Tennyson Dickens (1845–1912), son of Charles Dickens
- Steve Dick Tennyson Matenje (born 1956), Malawian civil servant and permanent representative
- Horace Tennyson O'Rourke (1880–1963), Dublin city architect for 88 Corporation
- B. Tennyson Sebastian II, American sound engineer
- Walter Tennyson Swingle (1871–1952), American agricultural botanist

== Places ==
=== Australia ===
- Tennyson, Queensland
  - Tennyson railway station, Brisbane
- Tennyson, New South Wales
- Tennyson, South Australia
- Tennyson, Victoria
- Tennyson Point, New South Wales

=== New Zealand ===
- Tennyson Inlet

=== United Kingdom ===
- Tennyson Down

=== United States of America ===
- Tennyson, Indiana
- Tennyson, Texas
- Tennyson, Wisconsin

== Ships ==
- SS Tennyson

== See also ==
- Tenison
