= Richard Tenison =

Richard Tenison may refer to:

- Richard Tennison (1642–1705), Irish bishop
- Richard Tenison (politician), Irish M.P
