= Enfield Blackwater =

River in the counties of Kildare and Meath, Ireland

Coordinates: 52°51′N 7°27′W

River Blackwater (Enfield)
- Native name: An Abhainn Dubh (Irish)

Location
- Country: Ireland

Physical characteristics
- Source
  - location: Derrymahon, County Kildare
  - elevation: 90 m (300 ft)
- Mouth
  - location: Donore, County Meath to River Boyne, thence to Irish Sea
- Length: 24.5 km (15.2 mi)
- Basin size: 126.8 km^{2} (49.0 sq mi)
- Discharge
  - average: 0.24 m^{3}/s (8.5 cu ft/s)

The River Blackwater, also called the Enfield Blackwater, or Kildare Blackwater is a river that flows through the counties of Kildare and Meath in Ireland. It is a tributary of the River Boyne which flows into the Irish Sea at Drogheda.

== Course ==
The Enfield Blackwater has its source in the north of Kildare, near Timahoe. It flows northwest past Knockanally Golf Club, through Johnstown Bridge and along the Kildare-Meath county border. It is bridged by the M4 motorway west of Enfield and then passes under the Royal Canal via the Blackwater Aqueduct at Kilmorebrannagh/Kilmurry and continue to form the Kildare-Meath border until it veers northwards near Longwood and passes under the R160 road. The Enfield Blackwater drains into the River Boyne in Donore, County Meath about 12 km southwest of Trim, County Meath, just below Inchamore Bridge.

== Wildlife ==
Brown trout are the main fish species.

== See also ==
- Rivers of Ireland
- Knightsbrook River
