= John Thomas Foster =

Irish politician (1747–1796)

John Thomas Foster of Dunleer (1747 – 10 October 1796), was an Irish politician.

== Biography ==
He was the son of Rev Thomas Foster, Rector of Dunleer and Dorothy née Burgh. Foster was elected member to the Irish House of Commons for Dunleer in 1776 and held this seat until 1783. Subsequently he represented Ennis until 1790.

== Marriage and issue ==
Foster married 1776, Lady Elizabeth Hervey, the daughter of 4th Earl of Bristol; they separated 1781. After their separation, Elizabeth became mistress and later second wife of William Cavendish, 5th Duke of Devonshire. Together, they had two sons and a daughter:

- Frederick Thomas Foster (3 October 1777 – 1853) MP for Bury St Edmunds.
- Elizabeth Foster (17 November 1778 – 25 November 1778).
- Augustus John Foster, later Sir Augustus Foster, 1st Baronet (December 1780 – 1848).

Parliament of Ireland
Preceded by Robert Sibthorpe; Dixie Coddington	Member of Parliament for Dunleer; 1776–1783; With: William Thomas Monsell	Succeeded by John William Foster; Henry Coddington
Preceded by William Burton Conyngham; Francis Bernard	Member of Parliament for Ennis; 1783–1790; With: Stewart Weldon	Succeeded by Sir Lucius O'Brien, 3rd Bt; William Burton Conyngham
