= William Foster (bishop) =

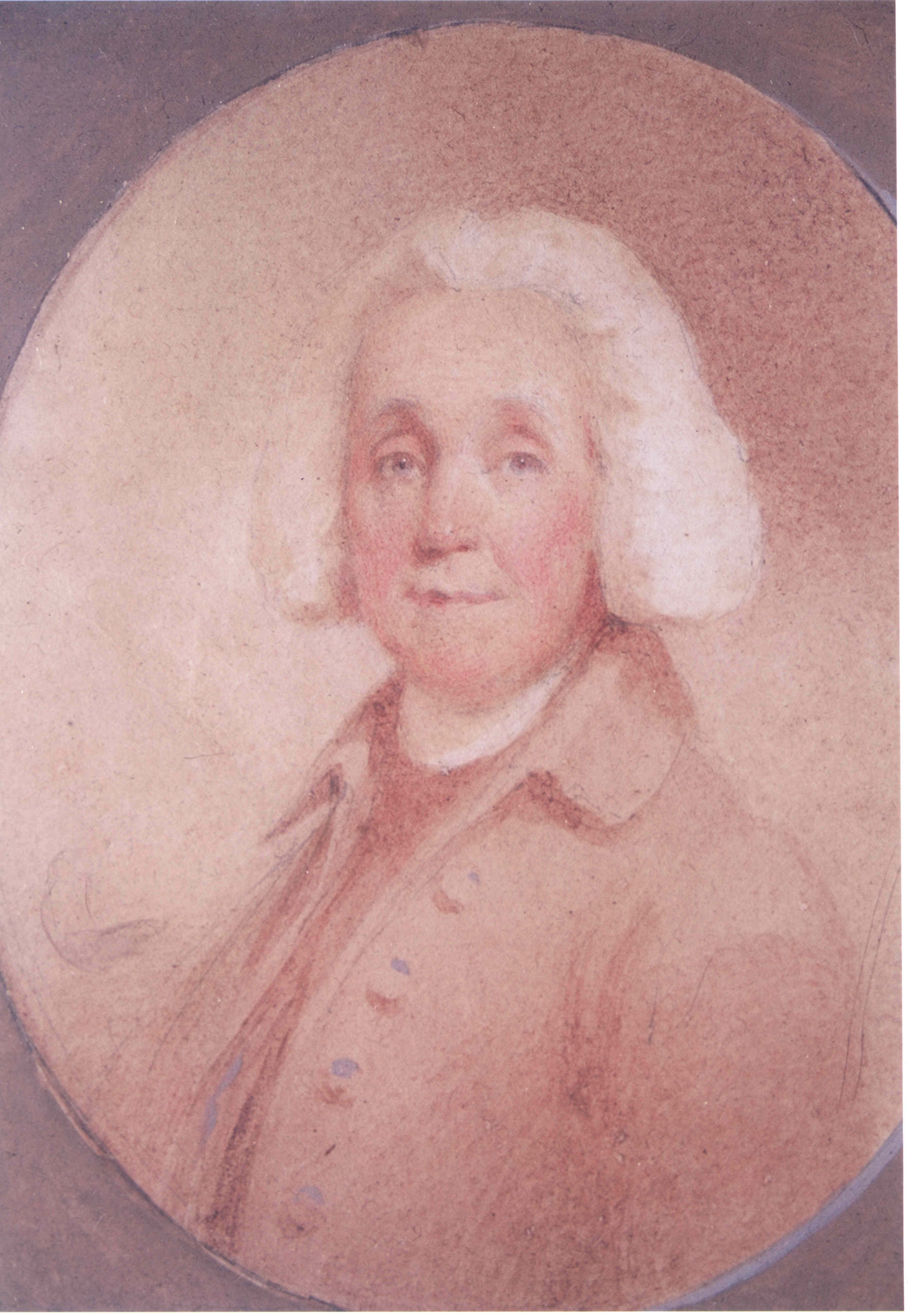
William Foster by Hugh Douglas Hamilton

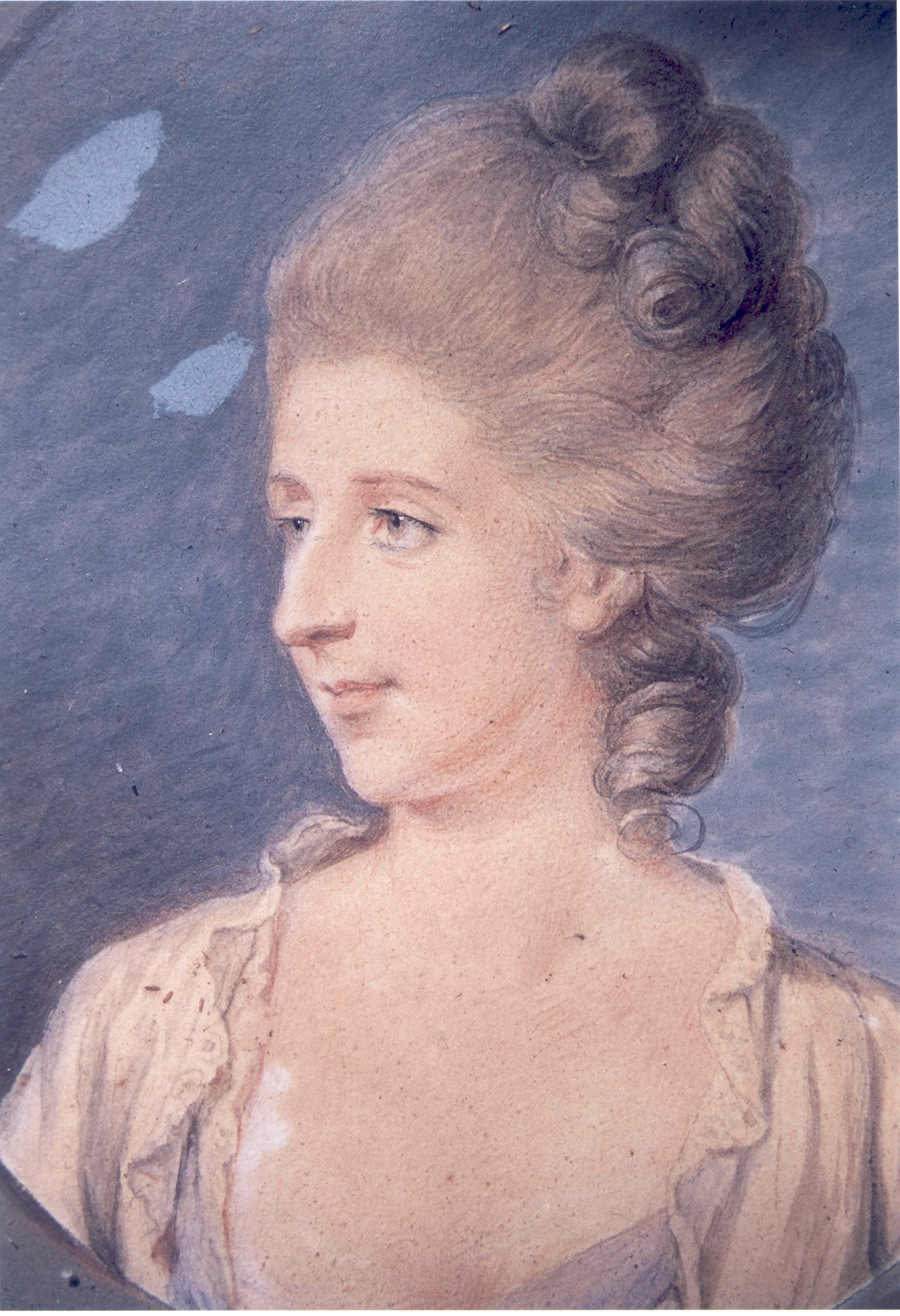
Catherina-Letitia, Mrs. William Foster (d.1814)

William Foster of Dunleer D.D. (3 July 1744 – November 1797) was a Bishop of the several parishes in the Church of Ireland.

== Biography ==
The younger son of Anthony Foster, Chief Baron of the Irish Exchequer, and his first wife Elizabeth Burgh, he was chaplain to the Irish House of Commons (1780–89), then successively Bishop of Cork and Ross (1789–1790), Bishop of Kilmore (1790–1796) and Bishop of Clogher (1796–1797). He was the younger brother of John Foster, 1st Baron Oriel. One of his first cousins, John Thomas Foster married Lady Elizabeth Hervey, a.k.a. Lady Bess Foster, daughter of Frederick Hervey, 4th Earl of Bristol, later mistress William Cavendish, 5th Duke of Devonshire. After the separation and divorce from her first husband and the death of her lover's first wife, Lady Georgina Spencer, Elizabth finally married him in 1809 and became the Duchess of Devonshire.

== Family ==
Foster married Catharina-Letitia Leslie (died 23 November 1814) daughter of Rev. Dr. Henry Leslie (1719–1803), LLD, of Ballibay, co. Monaghan. (Leslie, a scion of the family of the Earl of Rothes, was Prebend of Tullycorbet and then of Tandragee. His father, Rev. Peter Leslie, was rector of Ahoghill, and had married Jane, daughter of Most Rev. Dr. Anthony Dopping, Bishop of Meath). They had two sons, including John Leslie Foster, and five daughters. He was a father-in-law of Jerome, 4th Count de Salis-Soglio. He was a grandfather of Sir William Foster Stawell, William Fane De Salis and John Warren, 3rd Baron de Tabley.

== Death ==
William Foster died in November 1797, at the age of 53.
