= Margaretta Foster, 1st Viscountess Ferrard =

Irish politician (c.1737–1824)

The Right Honourable The Viscountess Ferrand
- Born: Margaretta Amelia Burgh; 1737
- Died: 20 January 1824 (aged 86–87)
- Spouse: John Foster (m. 1764)
- Parents: Thomas Burgh; Anne Downes
- Relatives: William de Burgh (brother); Walter Hussey Burgh (brother-in-law); Ulysses Burgh, 2nd Baron Downes (nephew); Thomas Skeffington (son)

Margaretta Amelia Foster, 1st Viscountess Ferrard (née Burgh; c. 1737 – 20 January 1824), was an Anglo-Irish peeress and wife of John Foster, 1st Baron Oriel who was the last Speaker of the Irish House of Commons.

She was the daughter of Thomas Burgh and Anne Downes, daughter of Dive Downes, Bishop of Cork and Ross, and his fourth wife Lady Catherine Fitzgerald. On 14 December 1764, she married the politician John Foster. On 5 June 1790, she was raised to the Peerage of Ireland as Baroness Oriel in her own right. The title was created in honour of her husband, but in such a way that would enable him to continue to serve as Speaker of the Irish House of Commons (1785–1800). On 22 November 1797, she was further honoured when she was made Viscountess Ferrard. Her husband was created Baron Oriel in his own right in 1821.

== Family ==
Viscountess Ferrard had three children. She was succeeded in her titles by her eldest surviving son by John Foster, Thomas, who also succeeded to his father's barony on his death in 1828.

== See also ==
- House of Burgh, an Anglo-Norman and Hiberno-Norman dynasty founded in 1193

Peerage of Ireland
New creation	Viscountess Ferrard; 1797–1824	Succeeded by Thomas Skeffington
New creation	Baroness Oriel; 1790–1824	Succeeded by Thomas Skeffington
