= Tenison =

Tenison is a surname. Notable people with the surname include:

- Eva Tenison (1880–1961), British historian and novelist
- Edward Tenison (1673–1735), Irish bishop
- Edward King-Tenison (1805–1878), Irish politician and photographer
- Henry Tenison (1667–1709), Irish politician
- Henry King-Tenison, 8th Earl of Kingston (1848–1896), Irish army officer and peer
- Julian Tenison-Woods (1832–1889), English Catholic priest and geologist
- Lady Louisa Tenison (1819–1882), English artist, traveller and author, wife of Edward King-Tenison
- Renee Tenison (born 1968), American actress
- Richard Tenison (politician) (1684–1725), Irish politician
- Rosie Tenison (born 1968), American actress and model, twin sister of Renee Tenison
- Thomas Tenison (1636–1715), Archbishop of Canterbury

== See also ==
- Hanbury-Tenison
- Tennison
- Tennyson (surname)
