= Daniello Concina =

Italian theologian (1687–1756)

The Reverend Daniello Concina O.P.
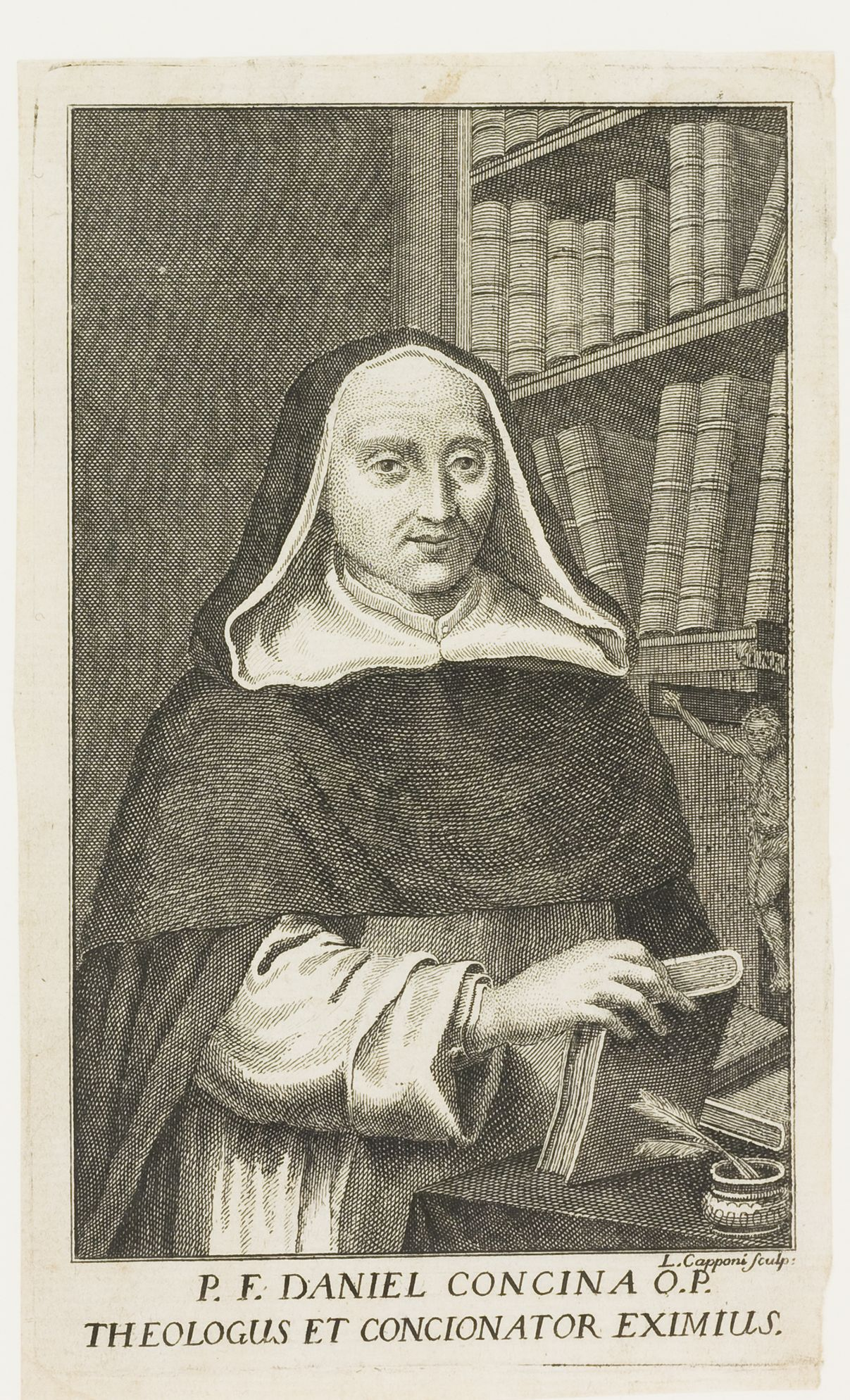
- Born: October 20, 1687; Clauzetto, Republic of Venice
- Died: 21 February 1756 (aged 68); Venice, Republic of Venice
- Resting place: Gesuati
- Occupations: Dominican friar; Theologian; Controversialist
- Parent(s): Pietro Concina and Pasqua Concina (née Cecconia)

Daniello Concina O.P. (20 October 1687 – 21 February 1756) was an Italian Dominican preacher, controversialist and theologian.

== Biography ==
He was born at Clauzetto, in what is now the Province of Pordenone in Friuli.

On the completion of his early studies at the Jesuit college at Görz (then in Austria), he entered the Dominican Order making his religious profession in March 1708, in the convent of Sts. Martin and Rose. After studying philosophy three years, he was sent to study theology in the convent of the Holy Rosary at Venice, where he spent eight years under the direction of the fathers of his order, Domenico Andriussi and Giovanni Alberto Zanchio. In 1717, he was appointed to the chair of philosophy, and later to that of theology, in the convent of Forlì.

About this time, he began to attract attention as a preacher. He confined himself at first to the smaller places, but his success soon brought him to the pulpits of the chief cities of Italy; and he preached the Lenten sermons seven times in the principal churches of Rome.

He died in Venice in 1756.

== Works ==
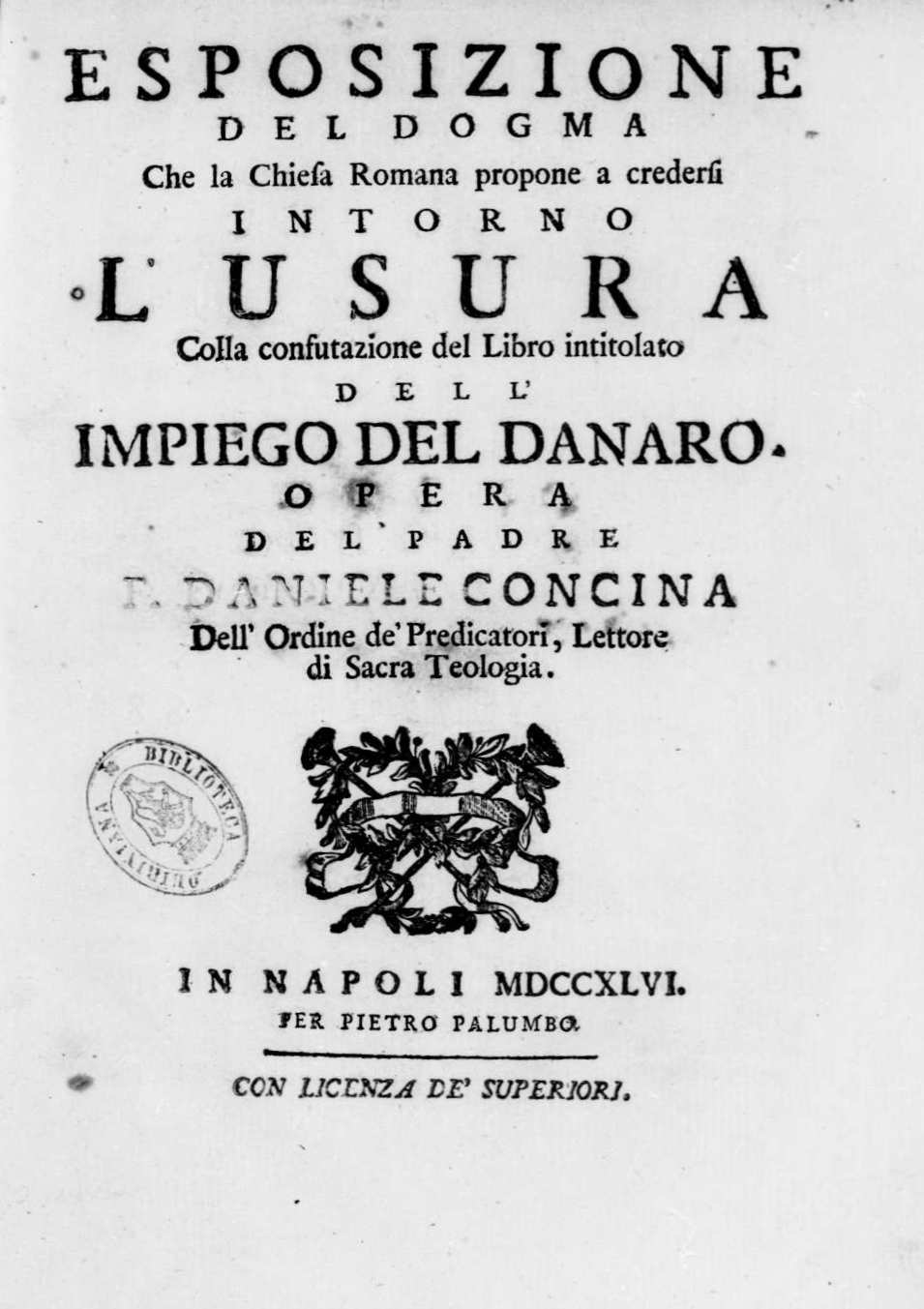
Esposizione del dogma che la Chiesa Romana propone a credersi intorno l'usura, 1746. A book against usury.

Concina's literary activity was confined chiefly to moral topics. His career as a theologian and controversialist began with the publication of his first book, "Commentarius historico apologeticus", etc. (Venice, 1736, 1745), in which he refuted the opinion, then recently adopted by the Bollandists, that St. Dominic had borrowed his ideas and form of religious poverty from St. Francis of Assisi. While engaged in the sharp controversy aroused by this work, he entered into another concerning the Lenten fast, which was not closed until Benedict XIV issued on 30 May 1741 the Encyclical "Non ambigimus" which was favourable to Concina's contention.

Shortly afterwards, he published his Storia del probabilismo e rigorismo (1743), a work composed of theological, moral and critical dissertations. Being directed against the Jesuits, it naturally gave rise to a large controversial literature. The work was highly praised by some notably by Benedict XIV, but among others it met with a very unfavourable reception. The Fathers of the Society of Jesus, the recognized champions of probable opinions in matters of conscience, were not slow in defending their position. The controversy reached a climax when Concina published, under the auspices of Benedict XIV, his Theologia christiana dogmatico-moralis (12 volumes in quarto, 1749–51). The Jesuits appealed to the pope to have it condemned on the ground that it contained errors and was very injurious to the Society. A commission of theologians was then appointed to examine the work, with the result that Concina was requested to prefix to the subsequent edition a declaration dictated by the pope. This declaration, which was practically a summary of the petition of condemnation made by his opponents, appeared in the edition of 1752, but that work itself showed no changes of importance, except the addition of one chapter to the preface in which the author protested that he had always entertained the sincerest regard for the Society of Jesus, that as private theologian he refuted opinions which he considered lax, regardless of authorship, and that if he had erred in any way or done any wrong, he was ready to make a full retractation (cf. Theol. Christ., ch. xiii in praef. t. 1, p. cxxiv).

In his Theologia christiana, Concina found occasion to pay to the Society as a whole a glowing tribute. Many of its writers are spoken of by him in terms of high esteem. In Italy, he promoted the publication of a moral theology by the French Jesuit Paul Gabriel Antoine, which Benedict XIV ordered to be taught in the College of the Propaganda Fide.

Concina was a vehement participant in the controversy over probabilism. He argued for the probabiliorist side, condemning probabilists as lax and pernicious. Due to the severity of his opinions, he is sometimes classed among the rigorists.

Benedict XIV appointed him consultor of several Roman Congregations. Moreover, in his work De Synodo Dioecesana, as also in his Encyclical Libentissime of 10 June 1745, the pope refers to Concina as an authority on the question of the Lenten fast.

Concina is the author of about forty works, several of which are believed to be still in Italian libraries awaiting an editor.

=== Editions ===
- Esposizione del dogma che la Chiesa Romana propone a credersi intorno l'usura (in Italian). Napoli: Pietro Palumbo. 1746.
- Usura contractus (in Italian). Roma: Niccolò Pagliarini & Marco Pagliarini. 1746.
