= Knightsbrook =

- Village
- Location in Ireland
- Coordinates: 53°31′55″N 6°47′13″W
- Country: Ireland
- Province: Leinster
- County: County Meath
- Time zone: UTC+0 (WET)
  - Summer (DST): UTC-1 (IST (WEST))

Knightsbrook is a village and townland in County Meath, Ireland. It is located on the R158 road, close to the junction with the R159. to the south of Trim.

The town is located in the civil parish of Laracor. Knightsbrook Hotel and Golf Club stands to the north, and the Knightsbrook River flows through the south of the townland.

== See also ==
- List of towns and villages in Ireland
