= Bishop Butler =

Bishop Butler may refer to:

- Joseph Butler (b. 1692), Anglican Bishop of Bristol and Durham
- John Butler, 12th Baron Dunboyne (1731–1800), Roman Catholic Bishop of Cork
- Christopher Butler (bishop) (b. 1902), Catholic Bishop of Nova Barbara and Auxiliary Bishop of the Archdiocese of Westminster
- Thomas Frederick Butler (b. 1940), Anglican Bishop of Southwark
- Paul Butler (bishop) (b. 1955), Anglican Bishop of Durham
