= Butler v Moore =

1802 Irish case on priest-penitent privilege

Butler v. Moore, reported in MacNally's Rules of Evidence in 1802, was an Irish case decided by the Master of the Rolls in Ireland, Sir Michael Smith. It is an important precedent in the issue of priest–penitent privilege in the UK. The case concerned the will of Bishop John Butler, 12th Baron Dunboyne, who had converted from Catholicism to Protestantism. He was alleged, however, to have returned to Catholicism and, thereby, to have come within a penal law which deprived "lapsed papists" of the power to make a will.

== Facts ==
Butler was Roman Catholic Bishop of Cork at the time of the death of his nephew Piers Edmond Butler, the 11th Baron. Anxious to be able to transmit in a direct line the peerage and the headship of an ancient house, the new Lord Dunboyne appealed to the Pope for a dispensation from his vow of celibacy. It was refused him, and, thereupon, he became a Protestant and married, but had no issue. It is said that one day while he was driving along a country road a woman rushed out of a cottage, calling for a priest for someone who lay dangerously ill inside. Lord Dunboyne answered her "I am a priest", and, entering the cottage, he heard the dying person's confession. From that moment till the end of his life he conformed again, at least, privately, to the Catholic faith.

== Disputed will ==
His will left all his property to the trustees of the recently founded St. Patrick's College, Maynooth. The will was disputed by his sister, Mrs. Catherine O'Brien Butler, on the ground that, having reconverted to Catholicism, he was incapable of making one. In order to prove that fact, she administered interrogatories to the highly respected priest William Gahan, who had attended Lord Dunboyne, with whom he had maintained a long and friendly correspondence, shortly before his death, to the following effect: What religion did Lord Dunboyne profess, first, from 1783 to 1792? and, second, at the time of his death, and a short time before? As to the first question, Gahan answered that Lord Dunboyne professed the Protestant religion. To the second question he demurred on the ground that his knowledge (if any) arose from a confidential communication made to him in the exercise of his clerical functions, which the principles of his religion forbade him to disclose, nor was he bound by the law of the land to answer. The Master of the Rolls held, after argument by counsel, that there was no privilege, and he overruled the demurrer. Gahan adhered to his refusal to answer and he was adjudged guilty of contempt of court and was briefly imprisoned. This did not end the litigation which went on until 1808, and resulted in a compromise.

== Precedent overturned ==
This authority was decisively rejected by the President of the High Court of Ireland in 1945 in Cook v Carroll, where he found that a priest has an absolute privilege not to reveal what is said in the confessional.

== Bibliography ==
- Costello, C. (2000). Bishop Dunboyne's Dilemma: Faith or Fatherhood? - The Story of John Butler, Catholic Bishop of Cork, 1763-1787. The Woodfield Press. ISBN 0-9528453-9-3.
- Nolan, R. S. (1913) "The Law of the Seal of Confession", Catholic Encyclopaedia
