= Ian Beattie =

Actor from Northern Ireland

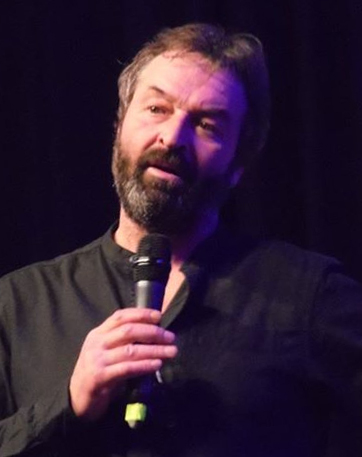
- Beattie in 2015
- Born: 3 March 1965 (age 61); Belfast, Northern Ireland
- Education: Methodist College Belfast; Queen's University Belfast; London Academy of Music and Dramatic Art
- Occupation: Actor
- Years active: 1989–present

Ian Beattie (born 3 March 1965) is an actor from Northern Ireland. He is best known for playing Antigonus in the film Alexander (2004) and Ser Meryn Trant in the television series Game of Thrones (2011–2015).

== Career ==
Beattie's acting career began at an early age, when he used to tour Northern Ireland in a circus with his father. His most notable role is Ser Meryn Trant in five seasons of the HBO fantasy drama Game of Thrones. He has also appeared in numerous other television and film projects, including Antigonus in Oliver Stone's Alexander, Beorhtwulf of Mercia in an episode of the History Channel's Vikings and Showtime's The Tudors.

On stage, he starred in the play Demented by playwright Gary Mitchell at the Lyric Theatre in Belfast.

== Filmography ==
=== Film ===
Year	Title	Role	Notes
1996	Space Truckers	Trooper	
2004	Alexander	Antigonus	
2007	Closing the Ring	Seamus McCarty	
2010	Mo	Michael Stone	TV film
2011	Brendan Smyth: Betrayal of Trust	Brendan Smyth	TV film
2012	Keith Lemon: The Film	Awards host	
2013	Starred Up	Officer Johnson	
2016	The Truth Commissioner	Beckett	
2016	The Journey	Gerry Adams	
2017	Papillon	Toussaint	
2018	Blackbird	Nick	Film released in 2022
2018	Viking Destiny	Kirkwood	
2022	Ann	Diarmuid	

=== Television ===
Year	Title	Role	Notes
1995	The Hanging Gale	Brian Sweeney	
2006	Killinaskully	Father Bob Gilmartin	Episode: 'The Sports Day'
2009	The Tudors	Sergeant	
2011–2015	Game of Thrones	Ser Meryn Trant	17 episodes
2014	Line of Duty	Bob	3 episodes
2014	37 Days	Tsar Nicholas II	
2014	Number2s	McCoubrey	6 episodes
2015	Vikings	King Brihtwulf	Episode: 'Mercenary'
2016	Barbarians Rising	Quinctilius Varus	2 episodes
2017	Doctor Who	Jackdaw	Episode: 'Empress of Mars'
2017	8 Days That Made Rome	Emperor Constantine	Episode: The Rebirth of Rome
2017	Tennison	Dr. Martin	Episode 1
2018	Quantico	Titus Walker	Episode: Ghosts
