= John Butler, 12th Baron Dunboyne =

Irish Catholic bishop and apostate

John Butler, 12th Baron Dunboyne (1731 – 7 May 1800) was an Irish clergyman and aristocrat, Roman Catholic Bishop of Cork and Ross. In order to advance his temporal title and marry he became, as of 2004, the only authenticated apostate in the Catholic hierarchy in Ireland

== Early life ==
Butler was the third son of Edmond Butler, 8th Baron Dunboyne (died 1732) and the widow Anne Nagle, née Grace. The family was part of a wealthy network of landed Butlers across Leinster and Munster. However, the family was subject to the British government's policy of curtailment of civil rights of Irish Catholics (see, Ireland 1691–1801:The Penal Laws).

Raised a Roman Catholic, John early acknowledged a vocation for the Church. His brothers, Pierce and Edmond chose the army and left the family home to fight in the War of the Austrian Succession. Butler commenced his studies at the Irish College in Rome, managing to lose his left eye in a duel, and was ordained priest in 1755 in the Basilica of St. John Lateran. He returned to Ireland in 1758, having completed his doctorate, though his Catholic credentials entailed an interview before a Justice of the Peace in Whitehaven. Butler returned to the Roman Catholic Archdiocese of Cashel and Emly, being appointed parish priest of Ardmayle in 1759. While he was establishing his place in the Church hierarchy, becoming an archdeacon and secretary to the bishop, he was also bolstering his secular role in the Butler family network.

== Bishop of Cork ==
The post of Bishop of Cork fell vacant in 1763 and Butler won immediate support as the leading candidate, being appointed by Pope Clement XIII in 1763. The years following his appointment marked a reduction in the civil disabilities of Catholics in Ireland and the relaxation afforded the Church the opportunity finally to implement the decrees of the Council of Trent in respect of the Irish hierarchy. Butler led the changes but was careful to use his secular network and status to maintain relationships with the Protestant establishment. For fear of Protestant sentiment, Butler stalled Nano Nagle's establishment of the Ursulines in Cork until 1771 and published a condemnation of the 1766 Cork coopers' riots.

Stole fees and other dues were resented and sometimes provided a pretext for Whiteboy violence towards the clergy. Butler issued a declaration, Statuta synodalia pro dioecesi Corcagiensi (1768), that involvement in the Whiteboys was a reserved sin. He supported the Test Act 1774 and gave substantial financial backing to the Catholic Committee.

== Baron Dunboyne ==
Butler inherited the title of Baron Dunboyne in December 1785 on the death of his nephew Pierce Edmond Creagh Butler, 11th Baron Dunboyne. Butler was childless and the Barony threatened with extinction if he had no heir, but as a priest, he was not permitted to marry.

In December 1786, he resigned as bishop and asked the pope for a dispensation from the ban on clerical marriage. The petition was refused. In spite of the refusal, in 1787 he married a cousin, Maria (1764/5-1860), the daughter of Theobald Butler. He took the oath of allegiance, abjuration, and supremacy.

He moved to his ancestral home at Dunboyne, County Meath, where the couple had a daughter who died quite young, and then to Dublin. Dunboyne, and the Catholic chapel, were burned in the 1798 rising. Dunboyne offered to have it rebuilt at his own expense, and donated his chalice to the parish priest at Fethard.

In 1800, an aged and infirm Butler wrote a letter of repentance to the pope, executed a will, and made his confession to Catholic priest Fr. William Gahan. He died in Dublin and was buried in the Augustinian friary at Fethard, County Tipperary.

== Testamentary litigation ==
Butler left his property to St Patrick's College, Maynooth and litigation from his family, notably by his sister, Mrs. Catherine O'Brien-Butler of Bansha Castle, County Tipperary, was swift. The legality of the will was challenged as the Penal Laws deprived Catholics of the right to make a will and a sequence of legal actions, such as Butler v. Moore (1802), ensued before a compromise between the college and the family in 1808. The compromise led to the Dunboyne establishment at the college to endow scholarships.

== See also ==
- Butler dynasty
- Apostasy in Christianity

== Bibliography ==
- Costello, C. (2000). Bishop Dunboyne's Dilemma: Faith or Fatherhood? - The Story of John Butler, Catholic Bishop of Cork, 1763-1787. The Woodfield Press. ISBN 0-9528453-9-3.
- Nolan, R. S. (1913) "The Law of the Seal of Confession", Catholic Encyclopaedia
- O'Connor, T. (2004) "Butler, John, styled twelfth Baron Dunboyne (1731–1800)", Oxford Dictionary of National Biography, Oxford University Press, accessed 9 August 2007 (subscription, Wikipedia Library access or UK public library membership required)

Catholic Church titles
| Preceded by Richard Walsh | Bishop of Cork; 1763–1786 | Succeeded by Francis Moylan |
Peerage of Ireland
| Preceded by Pierce Butler | Baron Dunboyne; 1785–1800 | Succeeded by James Butler |
