= Thomas Tennison =

Irish politician and judge (1707–1779)

Thomas Tennison (1707 – 27 March 1779) was an Irish politician and judge. He served as Prime Serjeant and as a judge of the Court of Common Pleas. He sat in the Irish House of Commons as member for Dunleer for many years.

He was born in Dillonstown, County Louth, only son of Henry Tenison (1667–1709), Member of Parliament for County Monaghan and later for County Louth and grandson of Richard Tennison (1642–1705), Bishop of Meath. The bishop was a cousin of, and on friendly terms with, the earlier Thomas Tenison who was Archbishop of Canterbury. The judge's mother was Anne Moore, daughter and co-heiress of Thomas Moore of Knockballymore, County Fermanagh, a cousin of the Earl of Drogheda. His father was a wealthy landowner of scholarly tastes, who was a member of the Dublin intellectual circle which revolved around Esther Johnson, the beloved Stella of Jonathan Swift; Henry and Swift had been friends at Trinity College Dublin. Henry died when his son was only two years old, and Anne had died the previous year. Thomas and his three sisters were raised by relatives, most likely by their uncle Richard Tenison junior, MP for Dunleer, who founded the County Monaghan branch of the family.

He married the heiress Dorothy Upton, daughter of Thomas Upton, Member of Parliament for Antrim, and cousin of the first Baron Templetown, by his wife Sarah Rowley of Derry. They had one son, Richard, who predeceased his father by 20 years, leaving at least one daughter but no son. Thomas's estate passed at his death to his nephew Dixie Coddington, the son of his sister Mary, who married Nicholas Coddington of Oldbridge. Dixie, like his uncle, represented Dunleer in the Commons for many years.

Thomas went to school in Dublin and matriculated from Trinity College Dublin in 1725. He entered Middle Temple in 1726 and was called to the Irish Bar in 1728. He acted as a Commissioner for Revenue appeals and became Prime Serjeant in 1759. Two years later he was appointed justice of the Court of Common Pleas. He died in Dundalk in 1779, while on assize.

He represented Dunleer in the Parliament of Ireland from 1728 to 1760 and from April to December 1761. As a politician he was noted for a style of oratory which was "warm, if not always clear"; in private life, he was noted as a connoisseur of wine.

Parliament of Ireland
Preceded by Francis North; William Tenison	Member of Parliament for Dunleer; 1728–1761; With: Francis North (1728–1738); Anthony Foster (1738–1761); John Foster (1761)	Succeeded by John Foster; Dixie Coddington
