= Knightsbrook River =

Watercourse in County Meath, Ireland

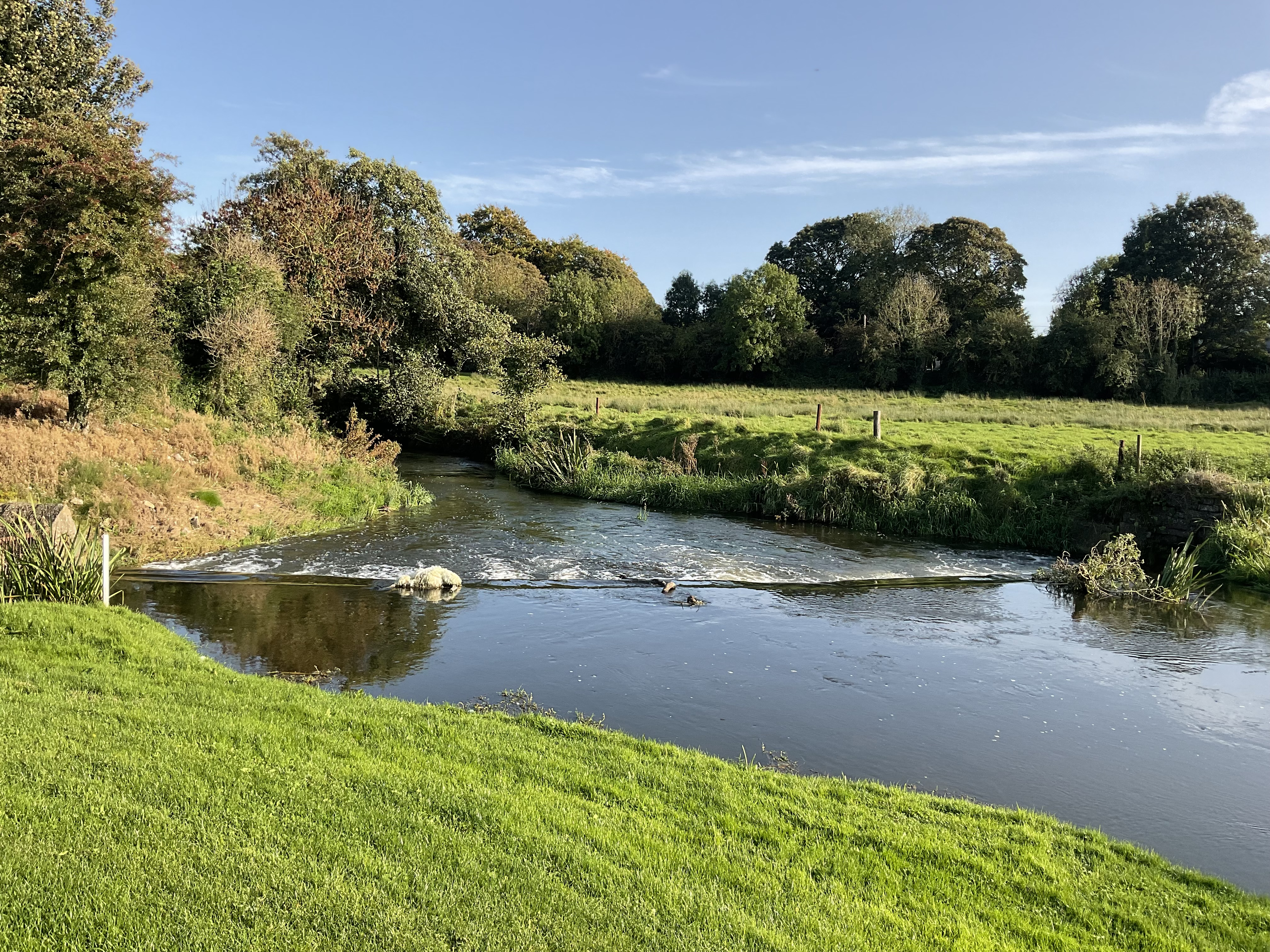
- Knightsbrook River flowing northeast

Physical characteristics
- Source
  - location: County Meath
- Mouth: River Boyne
  - coordinates: 53°33′03″N 6°44′54″W

The Knightsbrook River is a river in County Meath, Ireland.

The river rises near Summerhill, and flows north past the R156, and later the R158 and R159 roads, through Knightsbrook, and merges into the River Boyne a few kilometres to the east of Trim.
