= Michael Smith (judge) =

Irish judge

Sir Michael Smith Bt
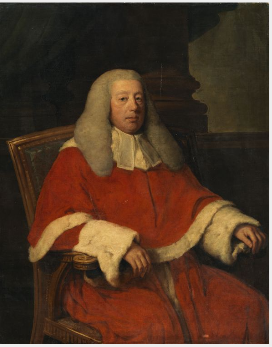

Master of the Rolls in Ireland
- In office 1801–1806

1st Baronet
- In office 1799–1808

Member of Parliament for Randalstown
- In office 1783–1793

Sir Michael Smith, 1st Baronet (1740–1808) was an Irish judge. He was the founder of a judicial dynasty, several of whose members were noted for eccentricity. He was also the first of the Cusack-Smith baronets of Tuam.

== Background and early career ==
He was born at Newtown, County Offaly, the son of William Smith (died 1747) and his wife Hester Lynch of Galway. The Smith family had come to Ireland from Yorkshire in the seventeenth century, and acquired substantial property in the Midlands. Michael revered the memory of his father, who died when his son was only seven, and later composed a eulogy which was inscribed on his father's tombstone. He graduated from Trinity College Dublin, and was called to the Bar in 1769. He was elected member of the Irish House of Commons for Randalstown in 1783, and was noted for his reason and moderation in debate, despite a rather "stiff and monotonous" delivery. As a politician, he supported the cause of Catholic Emancipation (his first wife Maryanne was a Roman Catholic).

== Judge ==
He was raised to the Bench as a Baron of the Court of Exchequer (Ireland) in 1793; in 1801 he became Master of the Rolls in Ireland, retiring in 1806. The Mastership of the Rolls had long been a notorious sinecure for politicians, many of whom had no legal qualifications whatever, and some of whom were Englishmen who rarely visited Ireland. The appointment of Smith, a lawyer of undoubted ability, is thought to have been the result of a conscious policy of making the Mastership a full-time and responsible judicial office; the policy was successful.

== Family ==
His first marriage to Maryanne Cusack, daughter and heiress of James Cusack of Ballyronan, County Wicklow, was an interesting one for an ambitious young lawyer as Maryanne was an open and devout Roman Catholic. They had two children, William and Angelina. Their son Sir William Cusack-Smith, 2nd Baronet followed his father into the law and as a Baron of the Exchequer. His appointment caused some disquiet, both because he was only 35 years old, and because he was already showing marked signs of eccentricity. William's second son Thomas Berry Cusack Smith continued the family traditions of judicial eminence and oddity: like his grandfather, he was Master of the Rolls in Ireland, and like his father, he was notably eccentric. William's sister Angelina married twice but had no issue. Her husbands were Smith Steele, a younger son of Sir Richard Steele, 1st Baronet, and William Borrowes, a younger son of Sir Kildare Borrowes, 5th Baronet of Barretstown Castle.

Maryanne died in 1798. Michael remarried his cousin Eleanor Smith, daughter of another Michael Smith. In 1799 he was made a baronet of Tuam in King's County: it was said that this was in recognition of his elder son's talents rather than his own. By his second marriage, he had one son, Michael, born posthumously. Young Michael joined the Army and rose to the rank of General. Sir Michael Smith died at Newtown on 17 December 1808.

== Reputation ==
According to Elrington Ball, he was noted for learning and eloquence; in contrast to his son and grandson, who were both notably hot-tempered, he was invariably calm and self-controlled. His speeches were invariably well-reasoned, though critics complained that his delivery of them was stiff and monotonous. Daniel O'Connell, then a rising young barrister, who thought poorly of Irish judges in general, complained of Smith's inefficiency, yet praised him as "a gentleman and a scholar, polite, patient and attentive".

While his first marriage to a Roman Catholic suggests that he was personally tolerant of the practice of Catholicism, and he was in favour of Catholic Emancipation, one of his best-known judgments, Butler v. Moore, held that a priest has no legal privilege to withhold evidence of what was said under the seal of the confessional. This decision was overruled in the twentieth century.

== Arms ==
Coat of arms of Michael Smith

Notes
Supporters granted separately to the second baronet by William Betham (Deputy Ulster King of Arms) on 8 March 1810.
Crest
In a ducal coronet Or a unicorn's head Azure armed Gold.
Escutcheon
Quarterly 1st & 4th Argent on a bend between two unicorns' heads erased Azure armed Or three lozenges of the last (Smith) 2nd & 3rd per pale Or and Azure a fess counterchanged (Cusack).
Motto
Mores Meliores Metallo

Legal offices
Preceded by The Earl of Carysfort and The Earl of Glandore (joint)	Master of the Rolls in Ireland; 1801–1806	Succeeded by John Philpot Curran
Baronetage of Ireland
New creation	Baronet (of Tuam); 1808–1836	Succeeded by William Cusack-Smith
