= Tennyson (surname) =

Tennyson is a surname, and may refer to:

- Alfred, Lord Tennyson (1809–1892), English poet
- Audrey Tennyson (1854–1916), British hospital founder, wife of Hallam Tennyson, 2nd Baron Tennyson
- Brian Tennyson (born 1962), American golfer
- Charles Tennyson (civil servant) (1879–1977), British civil servant and industrialist, grandson of Alfred Tennyson
- Charles Tennyson Turner (1808–1879), English poet, elder brother of Alfred Tennyson
- Emilia Tennyson (1811–1887), sister of Alfred Tennyson
- Emily Tennyson, Baroness Tennyson (1813–1896), American author and composer; wife of Alfred Tennyson
- Eóin Tennyson (born 1998), Northern Irish politician
- Frederick Tennyson (1807–1898), English poet, brother of Alfred Tennyson
- George Tennyson (1750–1835), English politician
- Georg Bernhard Tennyson (1930–2007), American scholar
- Hallam Tennyson (radio producer) (1920–2005), British radio producer
- Hallam Tennyson, 2nd Baron Tennyson (1852–1928), Governor-General of Australia, eldest son of Alfred Tennyson
- Harold Tennyson, 4th Baron Tennyson (1919–1991), British peer
- James Tennyson (born 1993), Northern Irish boxer
- Jean Tennyson (1898–1991), American soprano and musical theatre actress
- John Tennyson (born 1985), Irish hurler
- Jonathan Tennyson (car designer) (1945–1997), American solar-powered car designer
- Jonathan Tennyson (physicist) (born 1955), British physicist
- Julian Tennyson (1915–1945), British writer and historian
- Lionel Tennyson, 3rd Baron Tennyson (1889–1951), English cricketer
- Mark Tennyson, 5th Baron Tennyson (1920–2006), British peer and naval officer
- Matt Tennyson (born 1990), American ice hockey player
- Matthew Tennyson, English stage and screen actor
- McKinley Tennyson (born 1979), American soccer player
- Nick Tennyson (born 1950), American politician from North Carolina
- Pat Tennyson (born 1979), Irish hurler
- Pen Tennyson (1912–1941), British film director
- Walter Tennyson (1899–1980), British actor and film director
- William J. Tennyson Jr. (1923–1959), American jazz musician

== See also ==
- Tennyson-d'Eyncourt
- Tenison
