= John William Foster =

John William Foster (1745 – January 1809), of Rosy Park, was an Anglo-Irish volunteer and politician.

He was the grandson of John Foster of Dunleer, MP for Dunleer and Elizabeth, née Fortescue. Foster was appointed High Sheriff of Louth for 1776 and then elected member to the Irish House of Commons for Dunleer in 1783 and held this seat until 1790. His parents were William Foster and Patience Fowke who married in 1743.

Foster married 1788, Rebecca (b.c. 1764 d. 1853) only child of Hamilton McClure,. Esq., of Dublin, and died 1809.

He was ancestor of the Foster family of Ballymascanlon.

Parliament of Ireland
Preceded by John Thomas Foster; William Thomas Monsell	Member of Parliament for Dunleer; 1783–1790; With: Henry Coddington	Succeeded by Nicholas Coddington; John Foster
