= Laracor =

Parish in County Meath, Ireland

Coordinates: 53.521°N 6.785°W

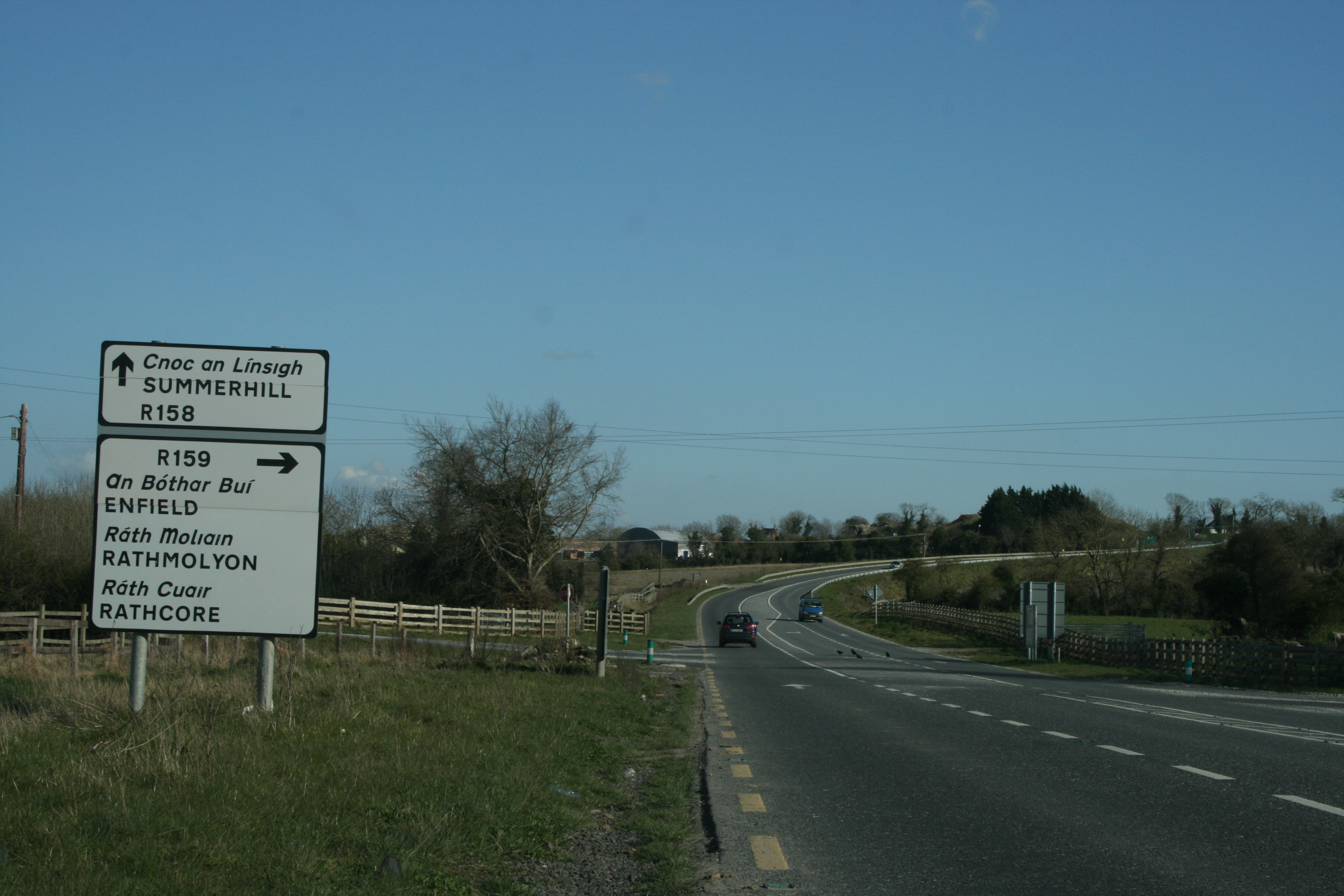
Crossroads at Laracor

Laracor, in Irish Láithreach Cora, is a civil parish which is located in County Meath in Ireland, south of Trim. It overlaps with the electoral division of the same name.

The civil parish consists of the 21 townlands of Adamstown, Ballinrig, Brownstown, Clondoogan, Clonmahon, Cnoc an Línsigh (Summerhill), An Daingean (Dangan), Fearann Eoin Baiste (Saintjohns), Freffans Great, Freffans Little, Ifferknock, Knightsbrook, the eponymous Láithreach Cora (Laracor), Maigh (Moy), Readstown, Springvalley, Stokestown, Summerhill Demesne, Summerstown, Umberstone Great, and Umberstown Little. Main roads are the R158 traversing the parish area lengthwise, the R159 joining the former in the north of the parish, and the R156 crossing the R158 in Summerhill village, the largest settlement in the parish area.

Jonathan Swift lived at Laracor from 1700 to 1713 as a church minister. His friend Richard Tenison, Bishop of Meath, had been Vicar of Laracor in the 1670s.

The ruins of Dangan Castle, the childhood home of Arthur Wellesley, 1st Duke of Wellington, are situated in Dangan townland north of Summerhill village.
