= Blackbird (2018 film) =

2018 spy film directed by Michael Flatley

- Official Poster
- Directed by: Michael Flatley
- Screenplay by: Michael Flatley
- Produced by: Michael Flatley
- Starring: Michael Flatley; Eric Roberts; Patrick Bergin; Ian Beattie
- Cinematography: Luke Palmer
- Edited by: Weronika Kamińska
- Music by: Owen Brady
- Production companies: Dance Lord Productions; West One Entertainment; Egg Studios; Five Knight Films Limited; Parachute Film Studios
- Release date: September 28, 2018 (Raindance)
- Running time: 90 minutes
- Country: United Kingdom
- Language: English

Blackbird is a 2018 spy film directed, produced, written by and starring Michael Flatley. With a release delayed for several years, Blackbird was dismissed as a vanity project by the entertainment press, with Brian Lloyd of entertainment.ie comparing Flatley to Tommy Wiseau of The Room infamy.

== Plot ==
The secret agent "Blackbird" retires and opens a nightclub in the Caribbean to escape his past. A former lover comes to meet him, but brings trouble with her.

== Cast ==
- Michael Flatley as Victor Blackley
- Eric Roberts as Blake
- Patrick Bergin as The Head
- Ian Beattie as Nick
- Rachel Warren as Brea
- Serhat Metin as Muhammed
- Nicole Evans as Vivian

== Production ==
Filming took place in County Cork, London and Barbados. It was largely financed by Flatley himself.

== Release ==
The first screening was a June 2018 private showing for cast and crew at the Stella Cinema, Rathmines, Dublin; Blackbird was shown at The May Fair Hotel, London as part of the Raindance Film Festival on 28 September 2018.

In 2018, Flatley claimed to be in pre-production for Blackbird 2. However, there was little news on a general release of Blackbird, fuelling speculation about the film's quality. In 2019, Brian Lloyd of entertainment.ie wrote a lengthy investigation of the film, finding out that "over 200 people attended the screening of 'Blackbird', and so far as can be reasonably determined, none of them were journalists or critics. When asked if perhaps the jury of Raindance Film Festival may have seen 'Blackbird', [David Martinez, a festival producer with Raindance] says this did not take place."

A general release of the film to Irish cinemas had been announced for September 2, 2022. The film premiered August 2022 in the Light House Cinema in Dublin.

=== Critical response ===
On Rotten Tomatoes, Flatley's film fell flat with an approval rating of 18% based on 11 reviews, it has an average rating of 2.00 out of 10. Film critic Mark Kermode said the film was "one of the worst films I've ever seen" and "Its not a vanity project, but an insanity project." Peter Bradshaw of The Guardian gave the film one out of five stars, lambasting the writing and directing, remarking, "In a way, it is amazing that Flatley is able to fulfil a 12-year-old boy's fantasy of being a secret agent, with a 12-year-old's idea of what a secret agent actually does. The acting and writing are like the non-sexy bits that come between the sexy bits in a porn film made in 1985." Ed Power in The Telegraph also gave it one out of five stars, dubbing it "unintentionally hilarious." Ian Freer of Empire opined, "By far the best performance in the film is by Flatley's seemingly endless collection of hats, the jaunty angle of a trilby suggesting more emotion than the actor ever does."

Michael Flatley won best actor at the 2021 Monaco Streaming Film Festival.
