= Paul Gabriel Antoine =

French theologian (1678–1743)

Paul Gabriel Antoine (10 January 1678 – 22 January 1743) was a French Jesuit theologian.

== Biography ==
Paul Gabriel Antoine was born at Lunéville. At the age of fifteen he applied for admission into the Society of Jesus, and was received 9 October 1693. On the completion of his studies, he taught humanities for several years, first in Pont-à-Mousson, and then in Colmar. Returning to the former town, he occupied the chair of philosophy, and later that of theology, the first edition of his Dogmatic Theology appearing in 1723, and three years later his Moral Theology in three volumes. Afterwards he was rector of the College of Pont-à-Mousson, where he died in his sixty-fifth year.

== Works ==
- Theologia universa, speculativa et dogmatica, a broad scholastic work which received an enthusiastic reception and established Antoine's theological reputation
- Theologia moralis universa (Nancy, 1726); another popular work, republished sixty times, including a 1747 Roman edition by Filippo da Carbognano with added chapters on Condemned Propositions, Reserved Cases, decrees of Benedict XIV, etc.

Benedict XIV prescribed the use of Antoine's Moral Theology by the students of the College of Propaganda, and it was likewise received by many of the bishops throughout France and Italy. In the opinion of Jean-Pierre Gury and Alphonsus Liguori, however, Antoine inclines too much toward the side of severity.

Besides his theological works, Antoine published also several ascetical and devotional treatises.
