= Anthony Foster =

Anglo-Irish politician and judge

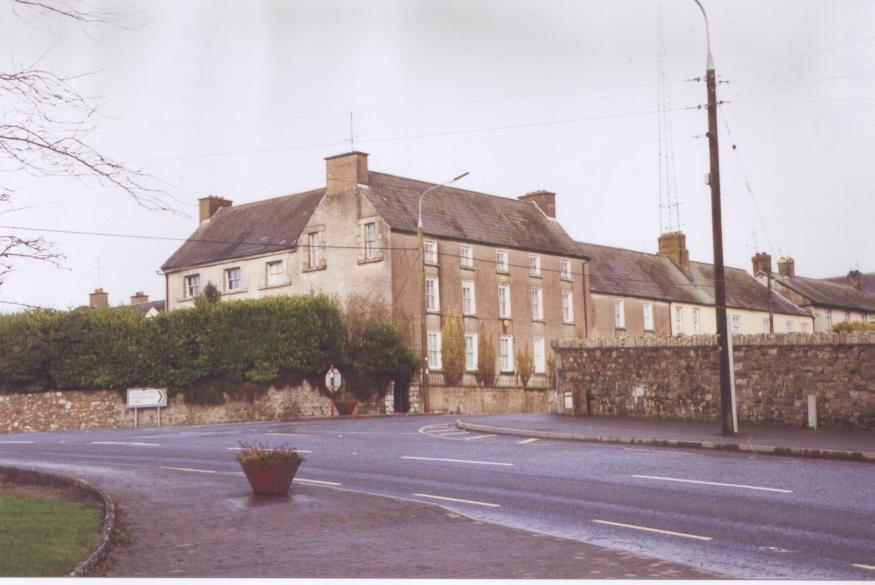
Collon House, which Foster built around 1740, present day

Anthony Foster of Dunleer (1705 – April 1779), of Collon, County Louth, was an Anglo-Irish politician and judge.

== Early life ==
He was the eldest son of John Foster, MP for Dunleer, and his wife Elizabeth Fortescue, youngest daughter of William Fortescue of Newrath, who was a member of the Fortescue family which later held the title Earl of Clermont. The Fosters had come to Ireland from Cumberland in the previous century and had acquired lands and political influence in Louth. He was Chief Baron of the Irish Exchequer 1766–1777. Prior to his appointment to the Bench, he represented the family constituency of Dunleer in the Irish House of Commons from 1738 to 1761 and subsequently County Louth from 1761 to 1767.

== Career ==
He attended the school in Dublin run by Thomas Sheridan, the friend of Jonathan Swift and grandfather of Richard Brinsley Sheridan. He matriculated from the Trinity College Dublin in 1722 and took his degree of Bachelor of Arts in 1726. He entered Middle Temple in 1726 and was called to the Irish Bar in 1732. He became King's Counsel in 1760 and acted as counsel to the Board of Revenue; unlike many of his judicial colleagues he never held office as a Law Officer or as Serjeant-at-law.

As a member of Parliament he worked hard to promote the interests of the manufacturers of Irish linen; there is no reason to doubt the sincerity of his belief in this cause (it fits well with his known interest in the improvement of agriculture), although Elrington Ball rather cynically notes that his support for the linen manufacturers brought him rich rewards, including a gold box. As an orator (which was a much-prized skill among the Irish public figures of his time) he was badly thought of, being described as "slow, sleepy and charmless".

== Family and personal life ==
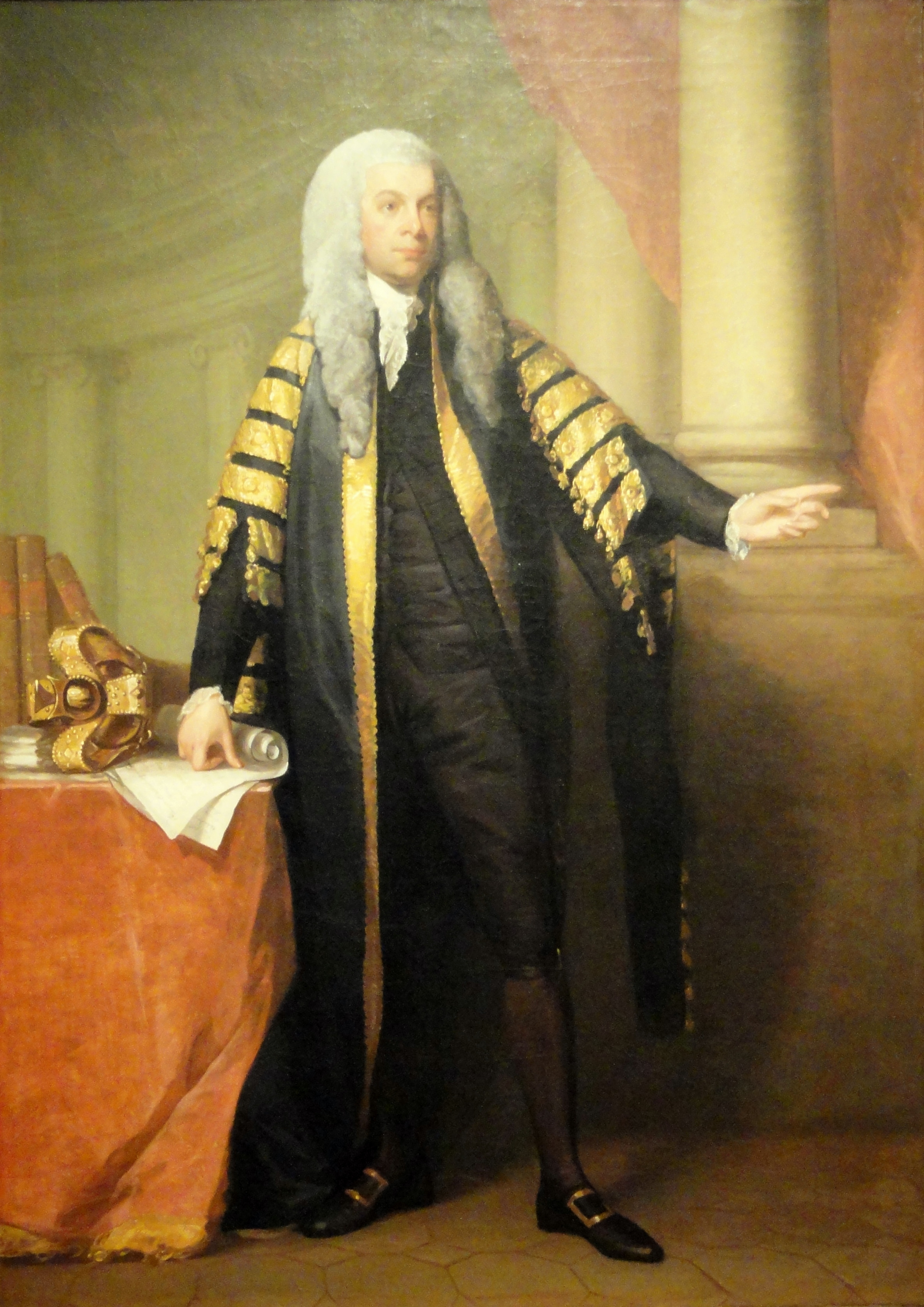
Anthony's eldest son and heir, John Foster, 1st Baron Oriel

He married firstly Elizabeth Burgh, daughter of William Burgh in 1736; she died in 1744. Together, they had three children, two sons and one daughter:

- John Foster, 1st Baron Oriel, the last Speaker of the Irish House of Commons.
- William Foster, who was successively Bishop of Cork and Ross, Bishop of Kilmore and Bishop of Clogher.
- Margaret Foster who married Henry Maxwell, successively Dean of Kilmore, Bishop of Dromore and Bishop of Meath.

He married secondly Elizabeth's cousin Dorothea de Burgh, daughter of the celebrated architect Thomas de Burgh and his wife Mary Smyth, in 1749. They had no children.

He built an impressive country seat, Collon House, which was much added to by his eldest son and heir, John Foster, 1st Baron Oriel. Anthony had a keen interest in agricultural development, and his improvements at Collon were described as being "of a magnitude never before attempted". Collon became famous for its great variety of trees and shrubs and its cider orchard.

== Reputation ==
Foster was not regarded as the most outstanding lawyer on the Irish Bench in his lifetime, but it has been argued that he was its most gifted member overall, with his wide-ranging interests in law, politics, trade and agriculture. If he has been largely forgotten, this may be because his reputation was eclipsed by that of his even more gifted son, John.

Parliament of Ireland
Preceded by Francis North; Thomas Tennison	Member of Parliament for Dunleer; 1738–1761; With: Thomas Tennison	Succeeded by John Foster; Thomas Tennison
Preceded by Thomas Tipping; William Henry Fortescue	Member of Parliament for County Louth; 1761–1767; With: James Fortescue	Succeeded by Stephen Sibthorpe; James Fortescue
