= John Foster of Dunleer =

John Foster of Dunleer (born 1665-died 16 May 1747) was elected member to the Irish House of Commons for the constituency of Dunleer, in County Louth.

== Biography ==
He was the son of Colonel Anthony Foster of Dunleer, whose father Samuel had come to Ireland from Cumberland. He held the position of Mayor of Dunleer Corporation.

== Personal life ==
He married in 1704 Elizabeth Fortescue, youngest daughter of William Fortescue of Newrath, County Louth, and first cousin to William Henry Fortescue, 1st Earl of Clermont. They had six children:

- Anthony Foster, Chief Baron of the Irish Exchequer
- Rev Thomas Foster DD
- John William Foster, MP for Dunleer. This, while widely quoted, seems to be incorrect. John had a son William Foster who married Patience Fowke, and John William Foster, MP for Dunleer, was their son
- Margaret Foster who married Stephen Sibthorpe
- Charlotte Foster who married Nicholas Forster
- Alice Foster who married Thomas Bolton.
- Rhoda Foster who married Roger Anketell
