= Cusack-Smith baronets =

Extinct baronetcy in the Baronetage of Ireland

The Smith, later Cusack-Smith Baronetcy, of Tuam in the King's County, was a title in the Baronetage of Ireland. It was created on 28 August 1799 for Sir Michael Smith, 1st Baronet, who was subsequently appointed Master of the Rolls in Ireland. Smith married as his first wife Maryanne Cusack of Ballyronan, County Wicklow. Their son, the second Baronet, assumed the additional surname of Cusack. He served as Solicitor-General for Ireland between 1800 and 1801, and as Baron of the Court of Exchequer (Ireland) from 1801 to 1836. The fourth baronet published a work on warships. The title became extinct on the death of the sixth Baronet in 1970.

The family seat was Newtown in County Offaly.

Thomas Cusack-Smith, younger son of the second Baronet, served Attorney-General for Ireland and as Master of the Rolls in Ireland.

Motto: En Dieu est mon Espoir (In God is my hope)

== Smith, later Cusack-Smith baronets, of Tuam (1799) ==
- Sir Michael Smith, 1st Baronet (1740–1808)
- Sir William Cusack-Smith, 2nd Baronet (1766–1836)
- Sir Michael Cusack-Smith, 3rd Baronet (1793–1859)
- Sir William Cusack-Smith, 4th Baronet (1822–1919), the author of Our War-Ships A Naval Essay (1886).
- Sir (Thomas) Berry Cusack-Smith, KCMG, 5th Baronet, (1859–1929), Her Majesty's Consul to Samoa 1890–1897, British Consulate-General, Valparaiso 1898–1907.
- Sir William Robert Dermot Joshua Cusack-Smith, 6th Baronet (1907–1970)

== Arms ==
Coat of arms of Cusack-Smith baronets
Notes Supporters granted separately to the second baronet by William Betham (Deputy Ulster King of Arms) on 8 March 1810. Crest In a ducal coronet Or a unicorn's head Azure armed Gold. Escutcheon Quarterly 1st & 4th Argent on a bend between two unicorns' heads erased Azure armed Or three lozenges of the last (Smith) 2nd & 3rd per pale Or and Azure a fess counterchanged (Cusack). Supporters Dexter a merman Sable crined and garnished Or bearing in his exterior hand a trident of the second sinister a mermaid Sable crined and garnished Or and bearing in her exterior hand a mirror Proper framed and handled of the second. Motto Mores Meliores Metallo
