= William Downes, 1st Baron Downes =

Irish judge and politician

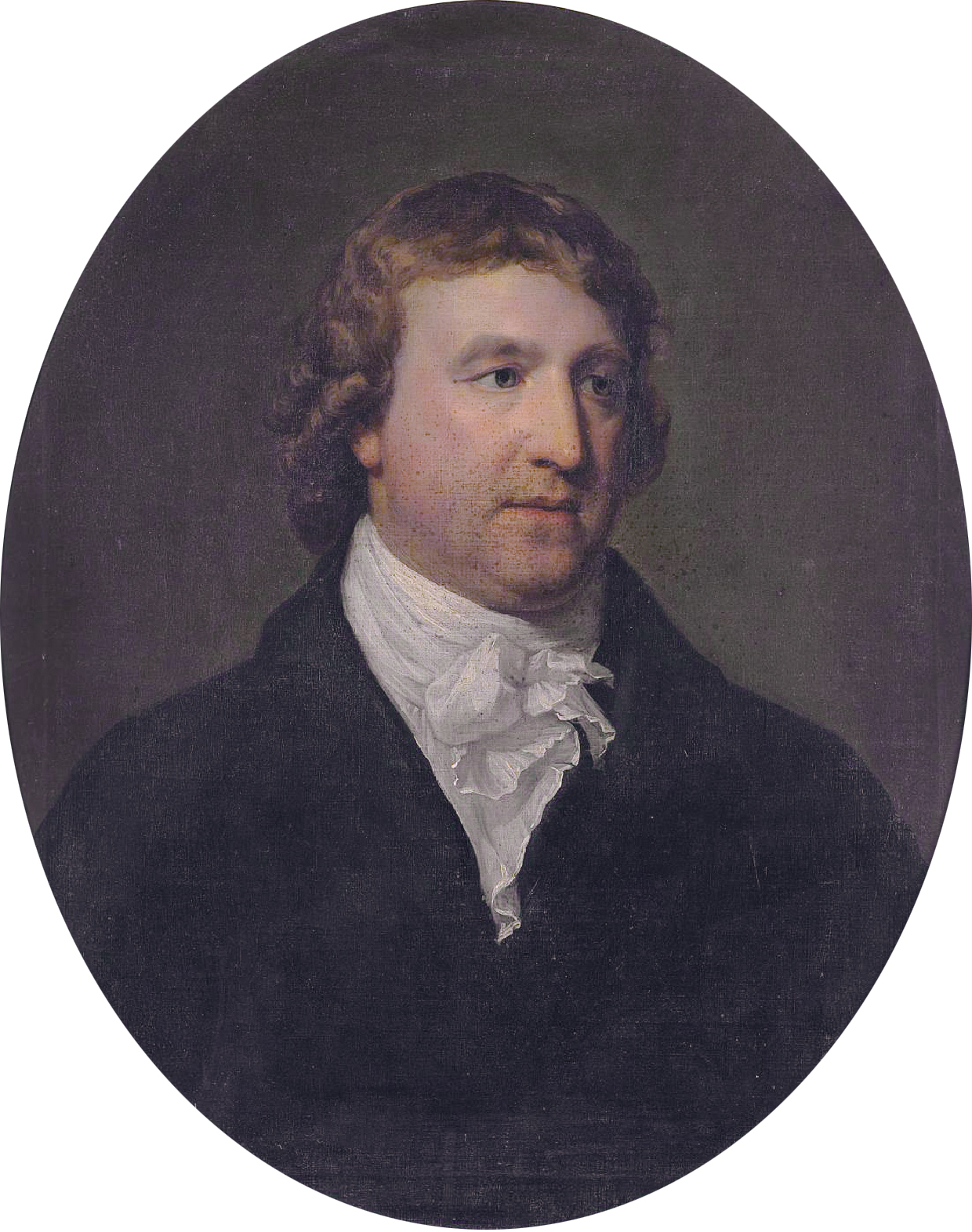
Lord Downes by Hugh Douglas Hamilton.

William Downes, 1st Baron Downes PC (1751 – 3 March 1826) was one of the leading Irish judges of his time, who held office as Lord Chief Justice of Ireland.

== Family ==
Downes was the second son of Robert Downes (1708-1754) of Donnybrook Castle, Dublin, MP for Kildare, and his wife Elizabeth Twigge, daughter of William Twigge, also of Donnybrook; he was a grandson of Dive Downes, Bishop of Cork and Ross and his fourth wife Catherine Fitzgerald. The Downes family came originally from Thornby, Northamptonshire. He was related to the influential Burgh and Foster families and, through his FitzGerald grandmother, to the Earl of Kildare. He had an elder brother Dive, who took holy orders; Dive died in 1798. Their father died when William was only three, reportedly from accidentally running himself through with his own sword.

== Career ==
He graduated from Trinity College Dublin, was called to the Bar in 1776 and was elected a member of the Irish House of Commons for Donegal Borough in 1790. He was appointed a judge of the Court of King's Bench in 1792; after the murder of Lord Kilwarden in 1803, Downes succeeded him as Lord Chief Justice of the King's Bench in Ireland. He was Vice-Chancellor of the University of Dublin 1806–1816.

=== Lord Chief Justice ===
Downes was regarded as "the acknowledged father of the law". The very low opinion held of him by his predecessor as Lord Chief Justice, John Scott, 1st Earl of Clonmell, who called him "cunning and vain", can be safely disregarded, as Clonmell disliked and despised most of his judicial colleagues and was never fair to them. Downes was not much liked, but he was respected for his integrity, although his manner was stern and intimidating, and it was said that he never laughed. He did enjoy a warm friendship with his colleague Tankerville Chamberlain, whose early death affected him greatly, but he disliked women, and was always uneasy in female company.

According to Elrington Ball, after the death of Kilwarden it was generally agreed that only Downes was fit to succeed him. He was one of the few judges whom Daniel O'Connell could not intimidate. At the trial of John Magee for seditious libel in 1813, O'Connell's conduct of the defence was so intemperate that another barrister said that he should have been prevented from speaking; Downes said drily that he personally regretted not having prevented O'Connell from practising law in the first place. On the other hand, Downes did let O'Connell speak in defence of his client at great length, and was severely criticised by the Chief Secretary for Ireland, Sir Robert Peel, for so doing.

He took a severe view of any form of judicial misconduct. In 1803 the author of a series of scurrilous letters attacking the Government, published under the pen name "Juverna" was exposed as Robert Johnson, a justice of the Court of Common Pleas (Ireland). Downes drove hard for his prosecution and conviction on the charge of seditious libel, and for Johnson's enforced retirement from the Bench. When Johnson tried to evade prosecution Downes had him arrested, telling him sternly that his attempt to evade justice was as great a crime as the libel itself.

He retired in 1822; despite his considerable age, and the fact that he had neither wife nor children (his dislike of women was proverbial), he accepted a peerage, and was created Baron Downes, of Aghanville in the King's County, with a special remainder to his cousin Ulysses Burgh. Ulysses was the grandson of William's aunt Anne Downes, who had married Thomas Burgh. He succeeded William as second and last Baron Downes. William lived at Booterstown, County Dublin.

== Death and burial ==
When he died he was buried in St Anne's Church, Dublin next to his judicial colleague William Tankerville Chamberlain (died 1802), who had been his inseparable friend for many years:"their friendship and union was complete...and now by the desire of the survivor they lie together in the same tomb" according to the epitaph.

Parliament of Ireland
Preceded by Henry Hatton; Sir John Evans-Freke, Bt	Member of Parliament for Donegal Borough; 1790–1797; With: Humphrey Butler	Succeeded by Humphrey Butler; William Keller
Legal offices
Preceded by The Viscount Kilwarden	Lord Chief Justice of Ireland; 1803–1822	Succeeded by Charles Kendal Bushe
Peerage of Ireland
New creation	Baron Downes; 1822–1826	Succeeded by Ulysses Burgh
