= Pat Tennyson =

Irish hurler

Personal information
- Native name: Pádraig Tennyson (Irish)
- Born: 16 May 1979 (age 47) Hugginstown, County Kilkenny, Ireland
- Occupation: Sales manager
- Height: 5 ft 11 in (180 cm)

Sport
- Sport: Hurling
- Position: Midfield
Club
- Years: Club
- Carrickshock
Club titles
- Kilkenny titles: 0
College
- Years: College
- 1999-2002: University College Dublin
College titles
- Fitzgibbon titles: 0
Inter-county
Years	County	Apps (scores)
2002-2004	Kilkenny	3 (0-02)
Inter-county titles
- Leinster titles: 2
- All-Irelands: 2
- NHL: 2
- All Stars: 0

Patrick Thomas Tennyson (born 16 May 1979) is an Irish hurler who played as a midfielder for the Kilkenny senior team.

Brother of Kilkenny hurler John, Tennyson joined the team during the 2002 Walsh Cup and was a regular member of the team for just three seasons. During that time he won two National Hurling League winners' medals on the field of play.

At club level Tennyson is a Leinster and county club championship medalist with Carrickshock in the intermediate grade. All Ireland Intermediate Club Championship winner 2017.

== Honours ==
Carrickshock

- All-Ireland Intermediate Club Hurling Championship: 2017
- Leinster Intermediate Club Hurling Championship: 2004, 2016
- Kilkenny Intermediate Hurling Championship: 2004, 2016
- Kilkenny Junior Hurling Championship: 1999

Kilkenny

- All-Ireland Senior Hurling Championship: 2002, 2003
- Leinster Senior Hurling Championship: 2002, 2003
- National Hurling League: 2002, 2003
- All-Ireland Under-21 Hurling Championship: 1999
- Leinster Under-21 Hurling Championship: 1999
