= John Foster (Dunleer MP) =

Anglo-Irish politician

John Foster (1770 – April 1792), styled The Honourable, was an Anglo-Irish politician.

Foster was the son of John Foster, 1st Baron Oriel and Margaretta, Viscountess Ferrard. He was educated at Eton College and Trinity College, Cambridge. Foster served as the Member of Parliament (MP) for Dunleer in the Irish House of Commons between 1790 and his early death in 1792. His brother Thomas Henry Foster succeeded him as MP.
