= Sir William Cusack-Smith, 2nd Baronet =

Irish baronet, politician and judge

Sir William Cusack-Smith Bt FRS
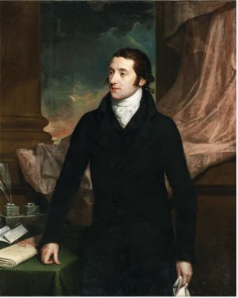

Member, Irish House of Commons
- In office 1794–1801
- Constituency: Lanesborough; Donegal Borough

Solicitor-General for Ireland
- In office 1800–1801

Baron of the Exchequer
- In office 1801–1836

Personal details
- Born: 23 January 1766
- Died: 21 August 1836 (aged 70)
- Spouse: Hester Berry
- Children: Michael, Thomas, Frances, Mary Anne

Sir William Cusack-Smith, 2nd Baronet FRS (23 January 1766 – 21 August 1836) was an Irish baronet, politician, and judge.

== Background and education ==
Cusack-Smith was the only surviving son of Sir Michael Smith, 1st Baronet, Master of the Rolls in Ireland from 1801 to 1806, and his first wife Maryanne Cusack, daughter of James Cusack of Ballyronan, County Wicklow. He was educated at Eton and Christ Church, Oxford.

== Legal and judicial career ==
Cusack-Smith was called to the Irish Bar in 1788, having studied at Lincoln's Inn, became King's Counsel in 1795, and was made Solicitor-General for Ireland in 1800. He was appointed a Baron of the Exchequer in 1801 at the remarkably early age of 35. The appointment caused some adverse comments, both because of his youth and because he was already displaying signs of eccentricity. In April 1805 he was elected a Fellow of the Royal Society.

He was an eccentric judge who offended Daniel O'Connell. O'Connell raised a motion, carried by MPs on 13 February 1834, to appoint a select committee to enquire into the conduct of Lord Smith in respect of his neglect of duty as a judge, and the introduction of political topics in his charges to grand juries. On the count of neglect, Cusack-Smith had been accused of rarely beginning his court sessions until after noon, occasionally running them until late into the night. The accusation of introducing political topics stemmed from statements made from the bench to grand juries condemning partisan agitation practices, which were themselves perceived as inflammatory due to their one-sided nature, although in fairness he was far from being the only judge to behave in this manner. On 21 February there was an important debate on the matter, and the resolution to appoint the committee was rescinded by a majority of six.

Cusack-Smith, though a devout member of the Church of Ireland, was a lifelong supporter of Catholic Emancipation (his mother was a Roman Catholic), but moved from early rejection of the Act of Union to supporting it. Despite this reversal, his conscientious conduct as a judge was well thought of to the extent that he was even congratulated by voices among the Repealers movement on his escape from parliamentary inquiry.

Cusack-Smith represented Lanesborough in the Irish House of Commons from 1794 to 1798. Subsequently, he sat for Donegal Borough until the Act of Union in 1801.

He was ill for some months before his death, but had appeared to recover. His death, at the family seat in Newtown, was sudden, and was generally believed to be suicide.

== Family ==
William Cusack-Smith added his mother's surname to his own upon her death. He married Hester Fleetwood Berry (29 Jan 1762 – 4 Jun 1832), daughter of Thomas Berry of Eglish Castle, County Offaly and his wife and cousin Frances. They had four children:

- Sir Michael Cusack-Smith, 3rd Baronet (1793–1859)
- Thomas Cusack-Smith, who followed in his grandfather's footsteps to become Master of the Rolls in Ireland.
- Two daughters, Frances Mary Anne and Mary Anne Angelina, neither of whom married. Frances (Fanny) lived to be 94.

Many of Hester's letters to members of her family, particularly her favourite brother Robert, survive.

== Publications ==
- The Patriot, or Political Essays, 1793.
- The Anonymous, Volume I, 1810.
- The Anonymous, Volume II, 1810.
- The Maze, a poem, 1815.
- Tracts upon the Union, 1831.
- Metaphysic Rambles, 1835.
- Ramble On; or dialogue the second between Warner Search, and Peter Peeradeal, 1835.
- Another stroll, being the third, of W.C.S. and his alter idem friend P.P., 1836
- The Goblins of Neapolis, 1836.

== Arms ==
Coat of arms of Sir William Cusack-Smith, 2nd Baronet
Notes Supporters granted separately to the second baronet by William Betham (Deputy Ulster King of Arms) on 8 March 1810. Crest In a ducal coronet Or a unicorn's head Azure armed Gold. Escutcheon Quarterly 1st & 4th Argent on a bend between two unicorns' heads erased Azure armed Or three lozenges of the last (Smith) 2nd & 3rd per pale Or and Azure a fess counterchanged (Cusack). Supporters Dexter a merman Sable crined and garnished Or bearing in his exterior hand a trident of the second sinister a mermaid Sable crined and garnished Or and bearing in her exterior hand a mirror Proper framed and handled of the second. Motto Mores Meliores Metallo

Parliament of Ireland
Preceded by Gervase Parker Bushe; Stephen Moore	Member of Parliament for Lanesborough; 1794–1798; With: Stephen Moore	Succeeded by Edmond Stanley; John La Touche
Preceded by William Keller; Humphrey Butler	Member of Parliament for Donegal Borough; 1798 – 1801; With: Hugh O'Donnell 1798–1799; Charles Kendal Bushe 1799–1801	Succeeded by Parliament of the United Kingdom
Legal offices
Preceded by John Stewart	Solicitor-General for Ireland; 1800–1801	Succeeded by James McClelland
Baronetage of Ireland
Preceded by Michael Smith	Baronet (of Tuam); 1808–1836	Succeeded by Michael Cusack-Smith
