= Dixie Coddington =

Irish politician (1726–1794)

Dixie Coddington (1726–1794) was an Irish MP and army officer.

Coddington was born in Drogheda, eldest son of Nicholas Coddington of Oldbridge and Mary Tenison, daughter of Henry Tenison MP, of Dillonstown, and Anne Moore of County Fermanagh. He was baptised on 31 January 1727. His unusual first name was derived from his great-grandmother Anne Dixie, who was possibly a daughter of Sir Wolstan Dixie, 1st Baronet (1602–1682), first of the Dixie Baronets; she married the first Nicholas Coddington about 1660. Coddington was educated at Trinity College, Dublin.

Coddington represented Dunleer in the Irish House of Commons from 1761 to 1776. It was effectively a family seat, having been occupied for many years by his uncle Thomas Tennison. He was High Sheriff of Meath in 1754, and an officer in the 9th Queen's Royal Lancers.

He married Catherine Burgh, daughter of Thomas Burgh and Anne Downes, daughter of Dive Downes, Bishop of Cork and Ross in 1754, and had several daughters, who all died young. He inherited a fortune from his uncle Thomas Tennison, MP and justice of the Court of Common Pleas (Ireland), who died in 1779. His main residence was Oldbridge House, County Meath, which still stands. On his death, without surviving issue, it passed to his brother Henry.

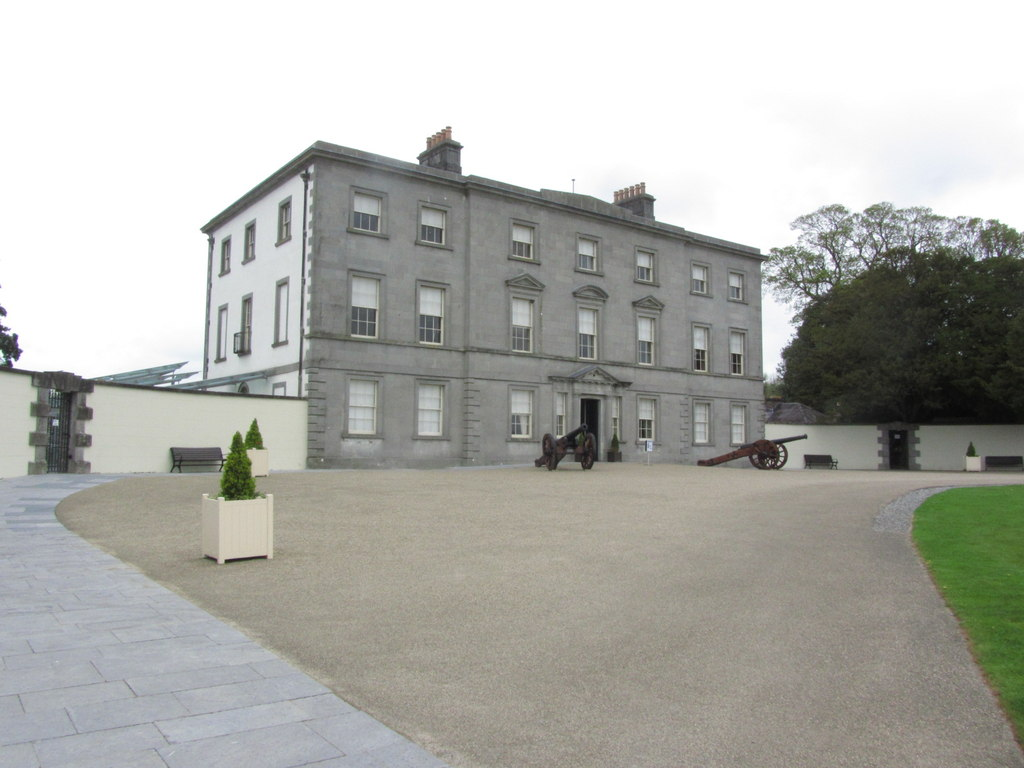
Oldbridge House near Drogheda, the Coddington family home
