= William Gahan =

Irish writer and priest

William Gahan (5 June 1732 in the parish of St. Nicholas, Dublin – 6 December 1804 in the parish of St. Nicolas, Dublin) was an Irish priest and author.

== Life ==
Gahan entered on his novitiate in the Augustinian Order, on 12 September 1748 and made his solemn profession on 18 September 1749. Shortly afterwards he was sent to the Catholic University of Leuven, where he commenced his ecclesiastical studies, on 1 June 1750. He was ordained priest on 25 May 1755, but remained some years longer in the university to obtain his degree of Doctor of Divinity. In 1761 he returned to Dublin, and the supply of parochial clergy at the time being insufficient, he was asked by Archbishop Richard Lincoln, and was permitted by his superiors, to take up the work of a curate in St. Paul's Parish. After three years in this capacity he returned to his convent in St. John's Street, where he held the office of prior from 1770 to 1778. In 1783 he was made provincial of his order, an office which he continued to hold for some years. In 1786-7 he travelled through England, France, and Italy.

=== Lord Dunboyne's will ===
About 1783 he made the acquaintance of Dr. John Butler, 12th Baron Dunboyne, Bishop of Cork, who afterwards turned Protestant on his succession to the title and estates of Dunboyne. A frequent and friendly correspondence took place between these two, and the grief which Dr. Gahan felt for his friend's abandonment of the Catholic faith (1787) was turned into joy when he attended Lord Dunboyne on his deathbed, and received him back into the Church (1800). For this, however, he was to suffer. In spite of Dr. Gahan's advice and that of John Thomas Troy, Roman Catholic Archbishop of Dublin, Lord Dunboyne insisted on willing his County Meath estate to the trustees of Maynooth College, recently founded (1795) by the Irish Parliament. But as the will was disputed by Lord Dunboyne's sister Catherine, and the issue of its validity, according to the law then in force, depended on whether or not the testator had died "a relapsed Papist", Dr. Gahan was compelled to appear as a witness and was asked to reveal the nature of his ministrations to the dying nobleman. He refused, of course, to do so, and after undergoing six painful examinations in the Chancery office in Dublin, he was committed to jail at the Trim assizes, on 24 August 1802, to which the case had been referred for final judgment, his persistent refusal to testify as to the religion in which Dunboyne had died being ruled by the presiding judge, Arthur Wolfe, 1st Viscount Kilwarden, to constitute contempt of court. This imprisonment, however, lasted only a couple of days.

=== Death and burial ===
Afterwards, Gahan returned to his convent in Dublin, where he remained for the rest of his life. He was elected prior again in 1803, an office he held until his death in the following year. As there were no Catholic cemeteries at the time, his remains were laid to rest in the graveyard attached to St. James's Protestant Church.

== Works ==
Gahan's major work is his "Sermons and Moral Discourses", which have gone through several editions (7th ed., Dublin, 1873). The 1913 Catholic Encyclopedia describes them as "characterized not so much by exceptional eloquence as by solid learning and genuine piety."

His other writings include:

- "A History of the Christian Church"
- "The Christian's Guide to Heaven, or complete Manual of Catholic Piety"
- "A Short and Plain Exposition of the Catechism"; "Catholic Devotion"
- "A Short and Easy Method to Discern the True Religion from all the Sects which undeservedly assume that name"
- "Youth Instructed in the Grounds of the Christian Religion"
- "The Devout Communicant" (a revision of Pacificus Baker's original)
- "The Spiritual Retreat, translated from the French of Bourdaloue"
- "An Abridgment of the History of the Old and New Testament", i.e. of Reeve's translation from the French of Royamount.

== Literary references ==
In James Joyce's story Araby, a copy of Gahan's "The Devout Communicant" is one of several paper-bound books which the protagonist - an adolescent boy in Dublin at the turn of the 20th Century - finds among old papers left by a deceased former tenant in his home, who had been a priest.
