= Tennyson-d'Eyncourt =

Tennyson-d'Eyncourt is a surname, and may refer to:

- Charles Tennyson-d'Eyncourt (1784–1861), British landowner and politician
- Edwin Tennyson-d'Eyncourt (1813–1903), British Royal Navy officer
- Sir Eustace Tennyson-d'Eyncourt, 1st Baronet (1868–1951), British naval architect and engineer
- Sir Gervais Tennyson-d'Eyncourt, 2nd Baronet (1902–1971), son of the 1st Baronet
