= Baron Downes =

Title in the Peerage of Ireland

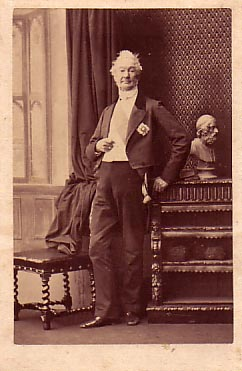
Ulysses Burgh, 2nd Baron Downes

Baron Downes, of Aghanville in the King's County, was a title in the Peerage of Ireland. It was created on 10 December 1822 for William Downes, Lord Chief Justice of Ireland from 1803 to 1822, with a special remainder in default of male issue (as seemed inevitable, as he was still unmarried at seventy, and was notorious for his dislike of the opposite sex) to his second cousin Ulysses Burgh. Lord Downes died childless and was succeeded according to the special remainder by his second cousin, the second Baron. He was a General in the Army, Member of Parliament for County Carlow and Queenborough and sat in the House of Lords as an Irish representative peer from 1833 to 1863. On his death on 26 July 1863, the barony became extinct.

== Barons Downes (1822) ==
- William Downes, 1st Baron Downes (1751–1826)
- Ulysses Burgh, 2nd Baron Downes (1788–1863)

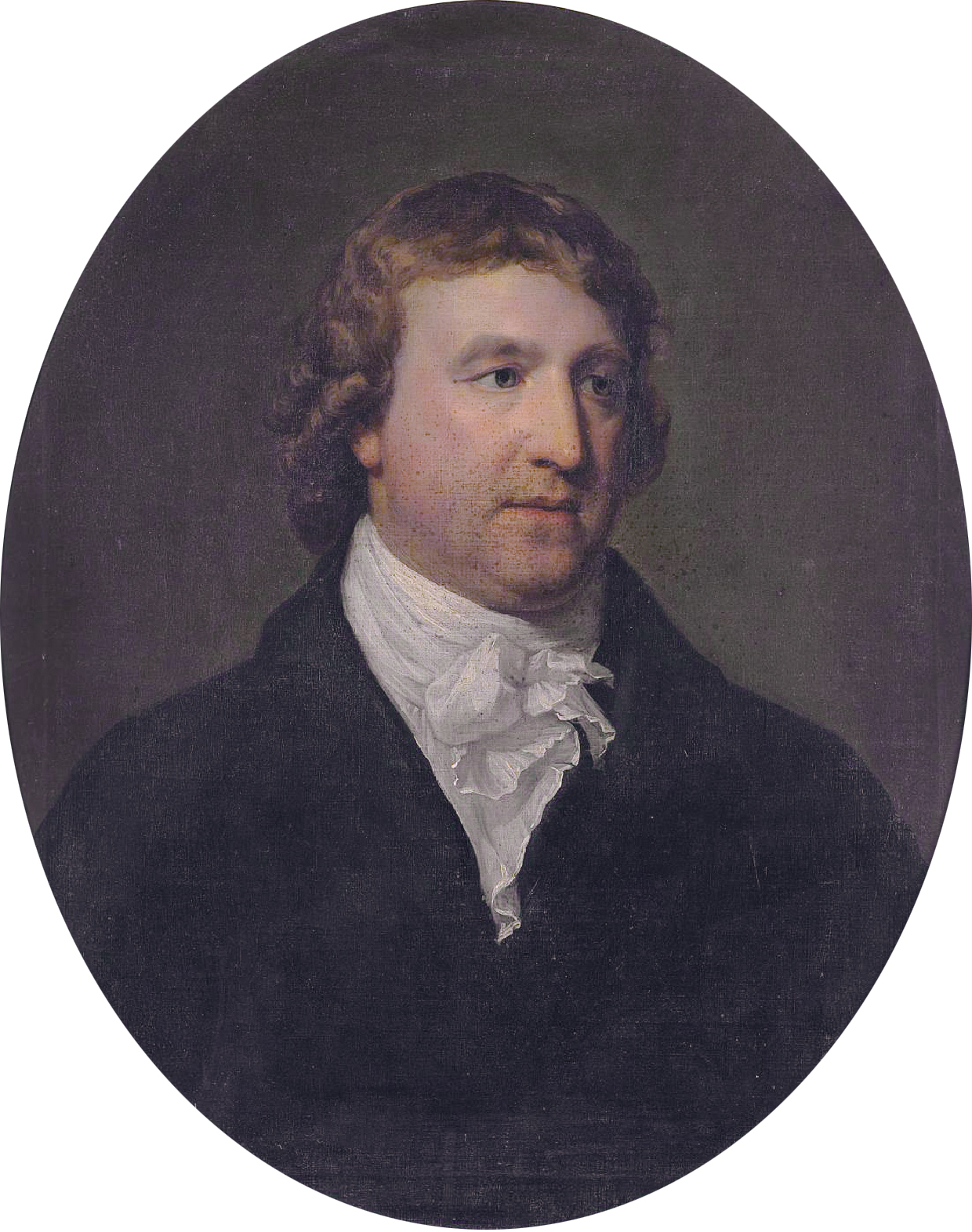
William, 1st Baron Downes by Hugh Douglas Hamilton
