= Dunleer (Parliament of Ireland constituency) =

Pre-1801 Irish constituency

- Former borough constituency for the Irish House of Commons
- County: County Louth
- Borough: Dunleer

1679–1801
- Seats: 2
- Replaced by: Disfranchised

Dunleer was a constituency represented in the Irish House of Commons to 1801.

== History ==
In the Patriot Parliament of 1689 summoned by James II, Dunleer was not represented.

== Members of Parliament, 1679–1801 ==
=== 1689–1801 ===
Election	First MP	Second MP
1689	Dunleer was not represented in the Patriot Parliament	
1692	Robert Aylway	Blayney Townley
1703	Stephen Ludlow	Blayney Townley
1713	Peter Ludlow	Blayney Townley
1715	Stephen Ludlow	Richard Tenison
1721	William Aston	Richard Tenison
1725	William Aston	Edward Moore
1727	Francis North	William Tenison
1728	Francis North	Thomas Tennison
1738	Anthony Foster	Thomas Tennison
1761	John Foster (Note: Also elected for County Louth in 1768, for which he chose to sit.)	Thomas Tennison
1762	John Foster	Dixie Coddington
1769	Robert Sibthorpe	Dixie Coddington
1776	John Thomas Foster	William Thomas Monsell
1783	John William Foster	Henry Coddington
1790	Nicholas Coddington	Hon. John Foster
1793	Nicholas Coddington	Hon. Thomas Henry Skeffington
1798	Henry Coddington	Hon. Thomas Henry Skeffington
1800	Quintin Dick	Hon. Thomas Henry Skeffington
1801	Disenfranchised	

== Bibliography ==
- O'Hart, John (2007). The Irish and Anglo-Irish Landed Gentry: When Cromwell came to Ireland. Vol. II. Heritage Books. ISBN 0-7884-1927-7.
- Leigh Rayment's historical List of Members of the Irish House of Commons. Cites: Johnston-Liik, Edith Mary (2002). The History of the Irish Parliament 1692-1800 (6 volumes). Ulster Historical Foundation.
