= Henry Tenison =

Irish politician (1667–1709)

Henry Tenison (1667–1709) was an Irish M.P.

The eldest son of Richard Tenison of Carrickfergus, Bishop of Meath and his wife Anne, he represented County Monaghan in the Irish House of Commons from 1695 to 1699, and thereafter represented County Louth from 1703 until his death.

He was educated at Trinity College Dublin and the Middle Temple. A man of scholarly tastes, he was a college friend of Jonathan Swift. Later, for a few years, he formed part of the intellectual circle which grew up around Esther Johnson, Swift's beloved Stella.

He was an active and dedicated Parliamentarian, supporting measures on social and moral reform, to strengthen the Church of Ireland, and to suppress the Roman Catholic faith. He worked hard to secure the passage of the Popery Act 1703, which was widely regarded as an attempt to eliminate the Catholic landowning class completely, and was consequently subject to fierce attacks by prominent members of that class like Sir Theobald Butler.

He married Anne Moore (died 1798), daughter and co-heiress of Thomas Moore of Knockballymore, County Fermanagh, a cousin of the Earl of Drogheda, and had four children, including Thomas Tennison, judge of the Court of Common Pleas (Ireland) and Mary, who married Nicholas Coddington of Oldbridge, County Meath, and had with other issue Dixie Coddington MP. After his own and his wife's early deaths, his children were evidently raised by his brother Richard Tennison. He lived at Dillonstown, County Louth.
