= Reeth Rishya Tennison =

Indian table tennis player (born 1995)

Reeth Rishya
Personal information
- Full name: Reeth Rishya Tennison
- Nationality: Indian
- Born: 27 April 1995 (age 31) Chennai, India

Sport
- Sport: Table tennis
Medal record
Women's table tennis
Representing India

Reeth Rishya Tennison (born 27 April 1995) is an Indian table tennis player. As of 2021, she is the second top-ranked female table tennis player in India and ranked 118th in the world as of March 2022. She represented India in the 2022 Commonwealth Games Birmingham.

== Early life ==
Reeth Rishya born 27 April 1995 in Chennai, Tamil Nadu. She is married to Sanil Shetty

== Career ==
Reeth has won her first international pro tour by winning the ITTF Ecuador Open, 2021.
