= Robert Bray (politician) =

Irish Member of Parliament of the 18th century

Robert Bray was an Irish politician.

Bray was educated at Trinity College, Dublin. He was MP for Lanesborough from 1715 until 1727.
