= Richard Tennison =

Church of Ireland bishop (1642–1705)

Richard Tenison (1642 – 29 July 1705) was an Irish bishop of Killala, Clogher and Meath.

== Biography ==
He was born the eldest son of Thomas Tenison of Carrickfergus and matriculated from Trinity College Dublin in 1659. Thomas Tenison, Archbishop of Canterbury, was a cousin, and supported Richard in his career; in his will the Archbishop left bequests to Richard's sons.

He was made headmaster of the Diocesan School at Trim. In 1669 he was presented as Rector and Vicar of the nearby parish of Laracor and in 1675 he was appointed Rector of Louth and Dean of Clogher. At Clogher, he was renowned for his skill in converting Nonconformists to the Church of Ireland. He owed his advancement largely to the Lord Lieutenant of Ireland, Arthur Capell, 1st Earl of Essex, whose private chaplain he became in 1672. On 19 February 1682 he was consecrated Bishop of Killala and Achonry, a position he held until he was translated to Clogher on 28 February 1691. He strongly opposed the pro-Roman Catholic policy of James II and, despite being summoned to the 1689 Patriot Parliament, ultimately left Ireland in protest. He took up a living in London, from which he returned to Ireland in 1690. From Clogher he was translated a second time on 25 June 1697 to Meath, where he remained until his death in 1705.

He was made a Privy Counsellor in 1697 and Vice-Chancellor of the University of Dublin in 1698.

By his wife Ann, he had eight children, six sons and two daughters. His eldest son, Henry (1667–1709), became MP for County Monaghan. Henry was a friend of Jonathan Swift and Esther Johnson ("Stella"), and father of Thomas Tennison, judge of the Court of Common Pleas. The Bishop's second son, Richard junior, was MP for Dunleer.

Richard is said to have been a respected and conscientious bishop, but without much political influence, or any desire to play a role in high politics.
