= Reserved cases =

Reserved cases (in the 1983 Code of Canon Law) or reserved sins (in the 1917 Code of Canon Law) is a term of Catholic doctrine, used for sins whose absolution is not within the power of every confessor, but is reserved to himself by the superior of the confessor, or only specially granted to some other confessor by that superior.

To reserve a case is then to refuse jurisdiction for the absolution of a certain sin. The reservation of sins presupposes jurisdiction, and therefore the pope alone can make reservation for the whole Church; bishops can do the same for their diocese only, and certain regular prelates for their religious subjects. That a sin be reserved it must be mortal, external, and consummated.

If a sin be reserved in one diocese, and a penitent, without the intention of evading the law, confess to a priest in another diocese where the sin is not reserved, the latter may absolve the reserved sin. Cases are reserved either

- merely on account of the sin itself, that is without censure, or
- on account of the censure attached to it.

In most cases, one's Ordinary (usually one's bishop) has the ability to lift ecclesiastical censure, although certain sins are reserved to the Apostolic See, including host desecration, assaulting the Pope, breaking the seal of the confessional, and consecrating another bishop without permission from the Pope.

If a penitent be in danger of death, any priest can absolve him, both from reserved censures and reserved sins. In case of reserved censures, if he recover, he must later present himself to the one having special power for reserved censures, unless the case was simply reserved to the pope. As to reserved sins, he need not, as a general rule, present himself again after convalescence.

In a case of urgent necessity, when it is not possible to have recourse to the proper superior, an ordinary priest may absolve a penitent, directly from unreserved sins and indirectly from episcopal reserved cases, but the penitent must afterwards apply to the person having power to absolve from the reservation. If there were also papal reservations, either simple or special, the absolution is direct, but in case of special reservations to the pope a relation must be made to the Holy See that its mandates on the subject may be obtained.

Ignorance of a censure prevents its being incurred, but moralists dispute whether ignorance of a reservation, with or without censure, excuses from its incurrence. If a case with censure reserved to the pope, all agree that ignorance does excuse from it; if reserved to a bishop, it is controversial. Some moralists hold that ignorance excuses from all reservations, whether with or without censure. It is certain, however, that a bishop has authority to declare that ignorance of a reservation does not prevent its incurrence in his diocese.

Ignorance of a censure (excommunication, interdict, removal from the exercise of certain ministries, or for clerics- deacons, priests, or Bishops, suspension from certain faculties), or of a reservation (to the Pope or the Bishop or Ordinary) attached to a particular mortal sin, are both distinct from ignorance of its status as a mortal sin. Persons who have reached the age of reason (about 6 or 7 years), have previously received the Sacrament of Reconciliation, and who possess the mental and other faculties needed to commit serious sins, and who committed the act (of omission or commission) with full knowledge and intent and were aware of its seriousness, may not receive Holy Communion—or any other prohibited Sacraments, if they are aware of the censure attached—before being properly absolved.

The 1917 Code of Canon Law divided reserved sins into two categories, ratione peccati (the nature of the sin itself) and ratione censuræ (the nature of the penalty attached).

== See also ==
- List of excommunicable offences in the Catholic Church
