= Dive Downes =

Dive Downes (b Thornby, Northamptonshire 1652 – d Dublin 1709) was Bishop of Cork and Ross from 1699 to 1709.

Downes was born in Northamptonshire, son of the Reverend Lewis Downes. He was educated at Trinity College, Dublin. He was ordained in 1678. In 1683 he became a prebendary of St Patrick's Cathedral, Dublin, and in 1690 Archdeacon of Dublin.

He was married four times. He married firstly Sarah Dodwell, daughter of Henry Dodwell of Athlone, secondly Anne Carleton, and thirdly Elizabeth Becher, daughter of Thomas Becher of Sherkin and widow of Horatio Townshend, by whom he had a daughter Elizabeth, who married her cousin Henry Baldwin of Mount Pleasant. By his fourth wife Catherine FitzGerald, daughter of the Honorable Robert FitzGerald and Mary Clotworthy, and sister of Robert FitzGerald, 19th Earl of Kildare, he had a son Robert Downes, MP for Kildare, of Donnybrook Castle, and a daughter Anne. Robert was the father of William Downes, 1st Baron Downes, Lord Chief Justice of Ireland. Anne married Thomas Burgh and was the mother of Margaretta Foster, 1st Viscountess Ferrard, and grandmother of Ulysses Burgh, 2nd Baron Downes.

He was a conscientious bishop, and in 1699–1700 he visited every parish in his diocese: his "Visitation of Cork" has survived.
