= R159 road (Ireland) =

Road in Ireland

R159 road
- Bóthar R159

Location
- Country: Ireland
- Primary destinations: Enfield - R148; Baconstown; Rathmolyon; Laracor terminates at the R158

Highway system
- Roads in Ireland; Motorways; Primary; Secondary; Regional

The R159 road is a regional road in County Meath, linking Enfield to Laracor.

== See also ==
- Roads in Ireland
- National primary road
- National secondary road
