= Lanesborough (Parliament of Ireland constituency) =

Pre-1801 Irish constituency

- Former borough constituency for the Irish House of Commons
- County: County Longford
- Borough: Lanesborough

–1801
- Seats: 2

Lanesborough was a constituency represented in the Irish House of Commons until 1800. It takes its name from the village of Lanesborough in County Longford.

== Members of Parliament ==
=== 1661–1692 ===
Election	First member	Second member
1661	Maurice Barklay	Sir Edward Crofton, 1st Baronet

=== 1689 (Patriot Parliament) ===
Election	First member	Second member
1689	Oliver FitzGerald	Roger Farrell

=== 1692–1801 ===
Election	First MP	Second MP	
1692	Fergus Farrell	Sir Humphrey Jervis	
October 1692	Thomas Handcock	Sir Humphrey Jervis	
1695	Thomas Handcock	Richard Gardiner	
1703	Nicholas Sankey	Henry Fox	
1713	William Burgh	Wentworth Harman	
1715	Robert Bray	Wentworth Harman	
1727	Thomas Marlay	Thomas Burgh	
1731	Anthony Marlay	Thomas Burgh	
1759	Anthony Marlay	John Hely-Hutchinson	Patriot
1761	William Harward	Henry Gore	
1768	William Harward	Matthias Earbery	
1771	Edward Bellingham Swan	Matthias Earbery	
1776	Robert Dillon	John Hely-Hutchinson	Administration
October 1783	Robert Dillon	David La Touche	
1783	Robert Dillon	Cornelius Bolton	
1790	Gervase Parker Bushe	Stephen Moore	
1794	William Smith	Stephen Moore	
January 1798	Edmond Stanley	John La Touche	
1798	Edmond Stanley	Richard Martin	
1800	Edmond Stanley	John Kelly	
