= Robert Sibthorpe =

English clergyman

Robert Sibthorpe or Sibthorp (died 1662) was an English clergyman who gained notoriety during the reign of King Charles I of England for his outspoken defense of the divine right of kings.

== Biography ==
Sibthorpe was a fellow of Trinity College, Cambridge, receiving his M. A. from that institution in 1619. He became vicar of The Holy Sepulchre, Northampton in 1619. He received his D.D. ca. 1626.

Sibthorpe first gained national prominence in 1627, when he gave an assize sermon in which he asserted the doctrine of passive obedience. King Charles I wanted to have Sibthorpe's sermon, along with a similar sermon delivered by Roger Maynwaring, printed. George Abbot, Archbishop of Canterbury opposed the publication of these sermons, but William Laud, Bishop of Bath and Wells urged George Montaigne, Bishop of London to license the publication and as a result the sermons were published. (Laud was promoted to Bishop of London in 1628 as a result.)

At the 1628 Parliament, John Pym moved in the House of Commons of England to impeach Sibthorpe and Maynwaring. In the House of Lords, the two were accused of subverting the commonwealth. As a result, Sibthorpe and Maywaring were imprisoned and fined; suspended from the ministry, prevented from clerical or secular advancement, and told they could not preach at Court.

The King was furious at Parliament's actions, and instructed Attorney General Robert Heath to draw up papers giving Sibthorpe and Maynwaring a royal pardon. Charles then made Sibthorpe a chaplain in the Chapel Royal, signaling his intention to defend Sibthorpe against future attacks from Parliament.

In 1629, Sibthorpe was appointed rector at Burton Latimer. He later became commissary of the Diocese of Peterborough, and in that capacity he gained a reputation as a zealous oppressor of Puritanism.

With the outbreak of the English Civil War, in 1643 Sibthorpe joined the king at Oxford. His living was sequestrated by the Long Parliament in 1647, but restored in 1660 at the time of the English Restoration.

== Legacy ==
Sibthorpe and Maynwaring remained hated by defenders of English liberty. Anthony Ashley Cooper, 1st Earl of Shaftesbury and John Locke continued to denounce Sibthorpe's opinions decades after his death. Algernon Sidney also spoke out against Sibthorpe and Maynwaring. In the next century, Jonathan Mayhew was continuing to denounce Sibthorpe and Maynwaring.
