= Richard Tenison (politician) =

Irish politician (1684–1725)

Richard Tenison (1684–1725) was an Irish M.P.

== Life ==
A younger son of Richard Tenison of Carrickfergus, Bishop of Meath and his wife Anne, and a brother of Henry Tenison, he represented Dunleer from 1715 to 1721. His cousin Thomas Tenison, Archbishop of Canterbury, left him a legacy at his death in 1714.

By his wife Margaret, he had a son William (died 1728) and two daughters. William briefly replaced his father as MP for Dunleer, but died in his early twenties, leaving issue. After Richard's death Margaret, who had been left a wealthy widow, married the well-known cleric Patrick Delany. She died in 1741.
