= Ulysses Burgh, 2nd Baron Downes =

British Army general and politician (1788–1864)

General The Right Honourable The Lord Downes GCB
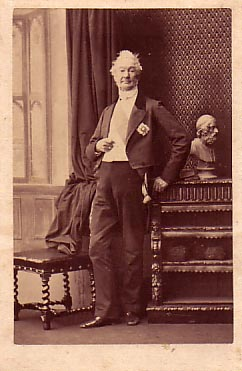
- Downes in 1850

Surveyor-General of the Ordnance
- In office 16 March 1820 – 18 May 1827
- Monarch: George IV
- Prime Minister: The Earl of Liverpool
- Preceded by: Sir Robert Moorsom
- Succeeded by: Sir Edward Owen
Parliamentary offices
Member of the House of Lords
Lord Temporal
Representative Peer for Ireland; 30 March 1833 – 26 July 1863
Preceded by	The Marquess Conyngham
Succeeded by	The Lord Inchiquin
Member of Parliament for Queenborough
In office 1826–1830 Serving with: John Capel
Preceded by	George Peter Holford; Lord Frederick Bentinck
Succeeded by	William Holmes; Sir Philip Durham
Member of Parliament for County Carlow
In office 1818–1826 Serving with: Henry Bruen
Preceded by	Henry Bruen; Robert Anthony Latouche
Succeeded by	Henry Bruen; Thomas Kavanagh

Personal details
- Born: 15 August 1788
- Died: 26 July 1864 (aged 75)
- Party: Tory
- Spouses: Maria Bagenal (m. 1815; died 1842) Christopheria Buchanan (m. 1846; died 1860)
- Military career
- Allegiance: United Kingdom
- Branch: British Army
- Service years: 1804–1863
- Rank: General
- Units: 54th Regiment of Foot; 92nd Regiment of Foot; 1st Foot Guards
- Commands: 54th Regiment of Foot; Grenadier guards; 29th Regiment of Foot
- Conflicts: Napoleonic Wars; Peninsular War; Battle of Talavera (WIA); Battle of Busaco; Battle of Fuentes de Oñoro; Battle of El Bodón; Siege of Ciudad Rodrigo; Siege of Badajoz; Battle of Salamanca; Battle of Majadahonda; Siege of Burgos; Battle of Vitoria; Battle of the Pyrenees; Battle of the Bidassoa; Battle of Nivelle; Battle of the Nive; Battle of Toulouse (WIA)
- Awards: Army Gold Cross; Military General Service Medal; Order of Saint Anna (Russia)

General Ulysses de Burgh, 2nd Baron Downes (15 August 1788 – 26 July 1864), was an Irish soldier and Tory politician. A General in the British Army, he served as Surveyor-General of the Ordnance under Lord Liverpool (1820–27) and, after succeeding a cousin as second Baron Downes (1826), he was an Irish representative peer in the House of Lords (1833–64).

== Background ==
Born Ulysses Burgh, he was the son of Thomas Burgh and Anne, daughter of David Aigion. His great-grandfather was Ulysses Burgh, Bishop of Ardagh. In 1848 he assumed by Royal licence the surname of de Burgh in lieu of simply Burgh. His grandfather Thomas Burgh was one of the foremost Irish architects of his time, who designed many notable buildings, including Trinity College Library and Dr Steevens' Hospital. His father was comptroller-general and commissioner of the revenue of Ireland, and second cousin of William Downes, who was Lord Chief Justice of Ireland from 1803 to 1822; and his two sisters had married respectively the Chancellor of the Irish Exchequer and the Chief Baron of the Irish Exchequer.

Ulysses Burgh was born in Dublin on 15 August 1788. He entered the British Army, and was promoted by family influence. He was gazetted ensign in the 54th Regiment of Foot on 31 March 1804, and was promoted lieutenant on 12 November 1804, and captain on 4 September 1806. He was employed in ordinary garrison duty with his regiment at Gibraltar and in the West Indies till 1808, when he exchanged into the 92nd and accompanied Sir John Cradock to Portugal as aide-de-camp.

== Peninsular War ==
When Sir Arthur Wellesley succeeded Cradock, he in his turn took Burgh, whose father was a close friend, as an aide-de-camp. Burgh was present at the battle of Talavera, where he was slightly wounded. He brought home the despatch announcing the victory at the battle of Busaco on 29 September 1810, was promoted major for the news, and was back again in Portugal by January 1811. He was then present at the battle of Fuentes d'Onor, at the combat of El Bodon, at the storming of Ciudad Rodrigo and Badajoz, and the battle of Salamanca, and again took home the news of Wellington's entry into Madrid. He was promoted lieutenant-colonel on 25 September 1812. He returned to Spain, and was present at the battle of Vittoria and the battle of the Pyrenees. He was present at the storming of San Sebastián, at the battle of the Nivelle, where his horse was killed under him; at the battle of the Nive, and the battle of Toulouse, where he was again wounded.

At the end of the war in 1814 Burgh was made KCB and KTS, and received a company in the Grenadier guards.

== Political career ==
Burgh was returned to parliament for County Carlow in 1818, a seat he held until 1826, and then represented Queenborough between 1826 and 1830. He held office under Lord Liverpool as Surveyor-General of the Ordnance between 1820 and 1827. In 1826 he succeeded his second cousin William Downes, 1st Baron Downes, who had no children, as second Baron Downes according to a special remainder in the letters patent. As this was an Irish peerage it did not entitle him to an automatic seat in the House of Lords and he was able to remain a member of the House of Commons. However, in 1833 he was elected an Irish representative peer and entered the House of Lords. In 1860 he was appointed a Knight Grand Cross of the Order of the Bath.

On the retirement of the Duke of Wellington from political life, Lord Downes also retired and occupied himself with the life of a country gentleman. He became in due course major-general on 10 January 1837, lieutenant-general on 9 November 1846, colonel of the 54th foot 1845–50, colonel of the 29th regiment on 15 August 1850, full general on 20 June 1854, and was made G.C.B. in 1869.

Downes died at Bert House, Athy, County Kildare, on 26 July 1863.

== Family ==
Lord Downes was twice married. He married firstly Maria, daughter of Walter Bagenal, in 1815. They had two daughters:

- Charlotte who married James Colborne, 2nd Baron Seaton
- Anne who married John Scott, 3rd Earl of Clonmell.

After her death in August 1842, he married secondly Christopheria, daughter of James Buchanan and widow of John Willis Fleming of North Stoneham Park, in 1846. There were no children from this marriage. She died in October 1860. Lord Downes died in July 1864, aged 75. The barony became extinct on his death as he had no sons.

== Honours ==
=== Orders, Decorations, and Medals ===
Country	Date	Appointment	Ribbon	Post-nominals
United Kingdom	1814–1864	Knight Grand Cross of the Most Honourable Order of the Bath		GCB
Portugal	1814–1864	Knight of the Military Order of the Tower and Sword		KTS
Russian Empire	1814–1864	Knight of the Order of St Anna		
United Kingdom	1810–1864	Army Gold Medal		
United Kingdom	1848–1864	Military General Service Medal		

== Ancestry ==
Ancestors of Ulysses Burgh, 2nd Baron Downes

8. William Burgh
4. Thomas Burgh
9. Margaret Parnell
2. Thomas Burgh
10. Dive Downes
5. Anne Downes
11. Catherine FitzGerald
1. Ulysses Burgh, 2nd Baron Downes
6. David Aigion
3. Anne Aigion

== See also ==
- House of Burgh, an Anglo-Norman and Hiberno-Norman dynasty founded in 1193

Military offices
Preceded by Sir John Byng, 1st Earl of Strafford	Colonel of the 29th (Worcestershire) Regiment of Foot; 1850–1863	Succeeded by James Simpson
Preceded by Sir Henry Sheehy Keating	Colonel of the 54th (West Norfolk) Regiment of Foot; 1845–1850	Succeeded by William Alexander Gordon
Parliament of the United Kingdom
Preceded by Henry Bruen; Robert Anthony Latouche	Member of Parliament for County Carlow; 1818–1826; With: Henry Bruen	Succeeded by Henry Bruen; Thomas Kavanagh
Preceded by George Peter Holford; Lord Frederick Bentinck	Member of Parliament for Queenborough; 1826–1830; With: John Capel	Succeeded by William Holmes; Sir Philip Durham
Preceded by The Marquess Conyngham	Representative Peer for Ireland; 1833–1863	Succeeded by The Lord Inchiquin
Political offices
Preceded by Sir Robert Moorsom	Surveyor-General of the Ordnance; 1820–1827	Succeeded by Sir Edward Owen
Peerage of Ireland
Preceded by William Downes	Baron Downes; 1826–1864	Extinct
