= Viscount Clermont =

Arms of Fortescue: Azure, a bend engrailed argent, plain cotised or

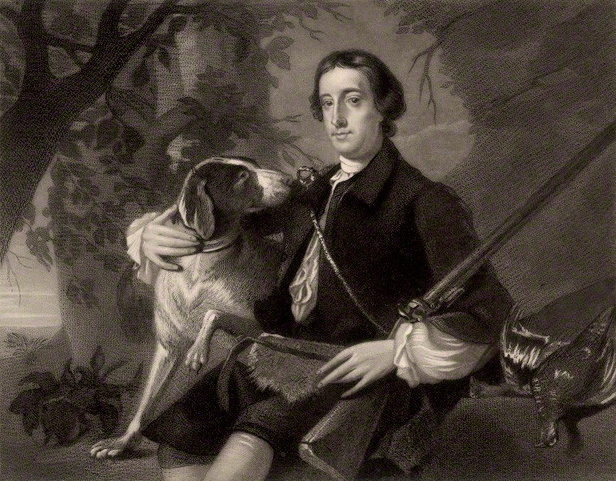
William Fortescue (1722–1806), 1st Baron Clermont (1770, normal remainder); 1st Baron Clermont (1776, special remainder); 1st Viscount Clermont (1776, special remainder); 1st Earl of Clermont (1777, normal remainder), all in the Peerage of Ireland. Mezzotint engraving of portrait by Thomas Hudson (1701–1779). Normal remainder titles extinct 1806, special remainder titles extinct 1829.

Viscount Clermont, of Clermont in the County of Louth, was a title in the Peerage of Ireland. It was created in 1776 for William Fortescue, 1st Baron Clermont, with special remainder in default of male issue of his own to his brother James Fortescue and the heirs male of his body.

He was the son of Thomas Fortescue (1683–1769), an Irish Member of Parliament and a descendant of the prominent and widespread family of Fortescue of Whympston in the parish of Modbury in Devon, England, the earliest Fortescue seat in the British Isles. Of the many branches of the Fortescue family which remained in Devon, that seated at Filleigh inherited in 1721 the ancient title Baron Clinton in the Peerage of England and subsequently obtained new titles in the Peerage of Great Britain of Baron Fortescue (1746), Earl Clinton (1746), Viscount Ebrington (1789) and Earl Fortescue (1789).

William Henry Fortescue had already been made Baron Clermont, of Clermont in the County of Louth, in the Peerage of Ireland in 1770, with normal remainder to heirs male, and in 1776 was again made Baron Clermont, of Clermont in the County of Louth, in the Peerage of Ireland, at the same time he was granted the viscountcy, but with special remainder to his brother James Fortescue. By that date it was apparent that he was unlikely to produce his own son and heir, hence the special remainder was granted. In 1777 he was further honoured when he was made Earl of Clermont, in the County of Louth, in the Peerage of Ireland, with normal remainder to heirs male. Lord Clermont died without male issue in 1806 when the barony of 1770 and earldom became extinct. He was succeeded in the barony of 1776 and viscountcy according to the special remainder by his nephew William Fortescue, the 2nd Viscount Clermont and 2nd Baron Clermont, the son of his aforementioned brother James Fortescue. The 2nd Viscount Clermont represented County Louth in both the Irish and British Parliaments and was an Irish representative peer. He died unmarried in 1829 when the barony and viscountcy became extinct.

The Clermont title was revived in 1852 when Thomas Fortescue was made Baron Clermont. He was a descendant of Chichester Fortescue, brother of William Fortescue, grandfather of the first Earl of Clermont.

== Nomenclature ==
William Henry Fortescue (1722–1806), the first holder of an Irish title using the name Clermont (the title Lord Clermont was used in the Peerage of Scotland), was a francophile with connections in the royal court of France, and it is believed for that reason adopted a French-sounding title, meaning literally "clear mountain", and a common place name in France. Sir Nathaniel Wraxall wrote on this subject as follows in his memoirs:

The very title of "Clermont" which he assumed when raised to the peerage — and which might be esteemed fictitious, as no such place I believe existed in Ireland — assimilated him to the blood royal of France; a younger branch of the illustrious line of Condé having been denominated "Comtes de Clermont". Probably he was not oblivious of this fact, in his selection of the title.

However, his biographer and kinsman Lord Clermont (d.1887), countered this suggestion and stated:

I cannot suppose that Lord Clermont was influenced by any such motive. The name, common among French towns, probably struck him as well-sounding, and he changed the appellation of one of his seats in Ireland to it, calling Reynoldstown "Clermont Park" and afterwards took his title from his residence. The fact of the name of Fortescue being made up of two French words may have suggested the idea of giving a French name to his estate.

However the same author had stated previously that the Earl's father, Thomas Fortescue, had purchased an estate near Dromiskin in Ireland, named Randalstown, which he renamed "Clermont Park". Clermont Park is an estate within County Louth and is near to Lurgangreen, Mooretown and Blackrock and Dromiskin. The mansion house was burned down by armed men in February 1923 when owned by Col. Charles Davis Guinness, county representative of the Irish Unionist Alliance, in one of the many politically motivated arson attacks at that period. An Industrial estate known as "Clermont Business Park" now occupies the site. Only the gatehouse survives, next to St Paul's Church, Haynestown. A Neolithic chambered cairn dating from about 4000–3500 BC, survives atop Black Mountain in the Cooley Mountains in County Louth, in which was situated Fortescue's estate, known in native Irish as Carnán Mhaighréid Náir, also known as Black Mountain Chambered Cairn and Clermont Cairn.

== Barons Clermont (1770) ==
- William Henry Fortescue, 1st Baron Clermont (1722–1806) (created Viscount Clermont in 1776)

=== Viscounts Clermont (1776) ===
- William Henry Fortescue, 1st Viscount Clermont (1722–1806) (created Earl of Clermont in 1777)

=== Earls of Clermont (1777) ===
- William Henry Fortescue, 1st Earl of Clermont (1722–1806)

=== Viscounts Clermont (1776; reverted) ===
- William Charles Fortescue, 2nd Viscount Clermont (1764–1829)

== Jacobite creation ==
In 1701, Charles Middleton, previously 2nd Earl of Middleton, was awarded the Jacobite peerages of Earl of Monmouth and Viscount Clermont in the Peerage of England. The titles, such as they were, became extinct on the death of his son in 1747.

== See also ==
- Baron Clermont
