= Baron Clermont =

Extinct barony in the Peerage of the United Kingdom

Arms of Fortescue: Azure, a bend engrailed argent, plain cotised or

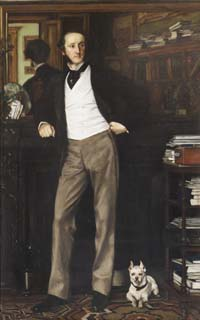
The 2nd Baron Clermont and 1st Baron Carlingford (1823–1898)

Baron Clermont is a title that has been created three times, twice in the Peerage of Ireland and once in the Peerage of the United Kingdom. All three creations are extinct. The first creation, Baron Clermont, of Clermont in the County of Louth, came in the Peerage of Ireland on 26 May 1770 for William Fortescue, who was later made Viscount Clermont and Earl of Clermont. For more information on this creation see Viscount Clermont, a title which became extinct in 1829. The second creation came in the Peerage of Ireland on 11 February 1852 when Thomas Fortescue, formerly Member of Parliament for Louth, was made Baron Clermont, of Dromisken in the County of Louth, with special remainder failing heirs male of his own to his younger brother Chichester Fortescue and the heirs male of his body.

Thomas Fortescue was the son of Chichester Fortescue, member of the Irish House of Commons for Hillsborough, son of Thomas Fortescue, member of the Irish Parliament for Trim, son of Chichester Fortescue, MP for Trim, grandson of Chichester Fortescue, whose brother William Fortescue was the grandfather of the aforementioned William Fortescue, 1st Earl of Clermont (see Viscount Clermont). Chichester Fortescue was the great-grandson of John Fortescue, husband of Susannah, daughter of Sir John Chichester and sister of Arthur Chichester, 1st Baron Chichester and Edward Chichester, 1st Viscount Chichester, ancestor of the Marquesses of Donegall (hence the common first name of Chichester). In 1866 Lord Clermont was also made Baron Clermont, of Clermont Park in the County of Louth, in the Peerage of the United Kingdom, with normal remainder to the heirs male of his body.

He died childless in 1887 when the barony of 1866 became extinct while he was succeeded in the barony of 1852 according to the special remainder by his younger brother, Chichester Fortescue, who in 1863 had assumed the additional surname of Parkinson. He was a Liberal politician and had already been raised to the Peerage of the United Kingdom in his own right as Baron Carlingford, of Carlingford in the County of Louth, on 28 February 1874, with normal remainder to heirs male. Like his elder brother Lord Carlingford was childless and both the Carlingford and Clermont baronies became extinct on his death in 1898.

Sir Chichester Fortescue, son of Chichester Fortescue, MP for Trim, was a Rear-Admiral in the Royal Navy and member of the Irish Parliament for Trim.

== Barons Clermont; First creation (1770) ==
- See Viscount Clermont

== Barons Clermont; Second creation (1852) ==
- Thomas Fortescue, 1st Baron Clermont (1815–1887)
- Chichester Samuel Parkinson-Fortescue, 1st Baron Carlingford, 2nd Baron Clermont (1823–1898) (brother)

== Barons Clermont; Third creation (1866) ==
- Thomas Fortescue, 1st Baron Clermont (1815–1887)
