= John Hamilton (died 1757) =

Anglo-Irish politician

John Hamilton (died 1757) of Holmpatrick, county Dublin was an Anglo-Irish politician who sat in the Irish House of Commons from 1725 to 1757 and in the British House of Commons from 1728 to 1734.

Hamilton was the second son of Henry Hamilton, of Bailieborough, County Cavan, and his wife Rebecca Blackwell. He was the great-grandson of William Bailie, Bishop of Clonfert.

Hamilton was returned to the Irish Parliament as Member for Carlow in 1725 and sat until 1727. He was then Member for Dundalk from 1728. He was returned as Member of Parliament for Wendover by a considerable majority at a by-election on 18 March 1728, presumably due to his distant cousin Lord Limerick, the other sitting Member. He was consulted by John Perceval, 1st Earl of Egmont on Irish matters in 1731, when he drafted a petition and bill to allow unenumerated commodities to go direct to Ireland from the colonies, instead of through Great Britain. He supported the Government, voting with them on the army in 1732 and the Excise Bill in 1733. He was proposed as a government candidate for Wendover late in 1733, but did not stand at the 1734 British general election.

Hamilton married Miss Ligoe and had one son Henry. His elder brother James Hamilton of Carlow, MP in the Parliament of Ireland was an ancestor of the Lords Holmpatrick.

Parliament of Ireland
Preceded by Richard Wolseley; Walter Weldon	Member of Parliament for Carlow; 1725–1727; With: Richard Wolseley	Succeeded by James Hamilton; Richard Wolseley
Preceded by Thomas Fortescue; Hans Hamilton	Member of Parliament for Dundalk; 1728–1757; With: Thomas Fortescue	Succeeded by Thomas Fortescue; James Fortescue
Parliament of Great Britain
Preceded by Richard Hampden; The Viscount Limerick	Member of Parliament for Wendover; 1728–1734; With: The Viscount Limerick	Succeeded by John Boteler; John Hampden
