= Bham =

Bham may refer to:

== People ==
- Min Bahadur Bham (fl. 2010s), Nepali film director
- Navnit Bham (1928–2007), Indian film director
- Y Bham Enoul, leader of United Front for the Liberation of Oppressed Races

== Places ==
- Bham Dam in Maharashtra, India

== See also ==
- Bham Bolenath, a 2017 Telugu film
- Birmingham, also known as "B'ham"
- Archie J. Bahm (1907–1996), American philosopher
- Bam (disambiguation)
- Birmingham (disambiguation)
- Bellingham (disambiguation)
