= William Fortescue, 2nd Viscount Clermont =

Irish politician

Arms of Fortescue: Azure, a bend engrailed argent, plain cotised or

William Charles Fortescue, 2nd Viscount Clermont (12 October 1764 – 24 June 1829), was an Irish politician.

== Origins ==
Fortescue was the son of James Fortescue by his wife Mary Henrietta Hunter, a daughter of Thomas Orby Hunter, of Crowland Abbey, Lincolnshire. His uncle was William Fortescue, 1st Earl of Clermont, 1st Viscount Clermont.

== Career ==
He served in the British Army, reaching the rank of lieutenant. In 1796 he was returned to the Irish House of Commons for County Louth (succeeding his brother Thomas James Fortescue), a seat he held until 1800, when the Irish Parliament was abolished on the formation of the Union. He was instead returned to the British Parliament for County Louth, where he remained until 1806.

== Succeeds uncle ==
In 1806 he succeeded his uncle Lord Clermont as 2nd Viscount Clermont according to a special remainder in the letters patent. This was an Irish peerage and did not entitle him to an automatic seat in the English House of Lords although he was forced to resign his seat in Parliament as Irish peers were barred from representing Irish constituencies in the House of Commons.

== Death ==
Lord Clermont died at Ravensdale Park, County Louth, in June 1829, aged 64. He was unmarried and the viscountcy died with him. The Clermont title was revived in 1852 when his kinsman Thomas Fortescue was made Baron Clermont.

Parliament of Ireland
Preceded by John Foster; Thomas James Fortescue	Member of Parliament for County Louth; 1796–1800; With: John Foster	Parliament of the United Kingdom
Parliament of the United Kingdom
New constituency	Member of Parliament for County Louth; 1800–1806; With: John Foster	Succeeded by John Foster; Viscount Jocelyn
Peerage of Ireland
Preceded by William Clermont	Viscount Clermont; 1806–1829	Extinct
