= Bellingham (surname) =

Bellingham is a surname. Notable people with the surname include:

- Alastair Bellingham (1938–2017), British haematologist
- Edward Bellingham (1506–1549), Lord Deputy of Ireland
- Sir Daniel Bellingham, 1st Baronet (c. 1620–1672), Anglo–Irish merchant and official
- Sir Edward Bellingham, 5th Baronet (1879–1956), Irish politician and soldier
- Elizabeth, Lady Echlin, née Bellingham, (c. 1704–1782), English writer
- Geoff Bellingham (born 1976), New Zealand badminton player
- George Bellingham (1862–1932), Australian politician
- Henry Bellingham, Baron Bellingham (born 1955), English politician
- Sir Henry Bellingham, 1st Baronet (died 1650), English politician
- Henry Bellingham (Irish politician) (died 1676), Anglo-Irish soldier and politician
- Sir Henry Bellingham, 4th Baronet (1846–1921), Anglo-Irish barrister-at-law
- James Bellingham (1623–1650), English politician
- James Bellingham (footballer) (1877–1955), Scottish footballer
- Jobe Bellingham (born 2005), English footballer
- John Bellingham (c. 1769–1812), assassin of British Prime Minister Spencer Perceval
- Jude Bellingham (born 2003), English footballer
- Judy Bellingham (born 1949 or 1950), New Zealand opera singer
- Kate Bellingham (born 1963), British engineer and former television presenter
- Lynda Bellingham (1948–2014), English actress
- Mark Bellingham (born 1976), English footballer
- Norman Bellingham (born 1964), American canoeist and Olympic champion
- Phillip Bellingham (born 1991), Australian cross-country skier
- Ray Bellingham (1916–1998), American basketball player
- Richard Bellingham (c. 1592–1672), colonial magistrate, lawyer, and governor of the Massachusetts Bay Colony
- Sydney Robert Bellingham (1808–1900), Irish-born Canadian businessman
- Thomas Bellingham (1644 or 1645 – 1721), Anglo-Irish soldier and politician
- Sir William Bellingham, 1st Baronet (1756–1826), after whom Bellingham Bay is named

Fictional characters:

- Morag Bellingham, fictional character in Home & Away
