= Dundalk (Parliament of Ireland constituency) =

Pre-1801 Irish constituency

- Former borough constituency for the Irish House of Commons
- County: County Louth
- Borough: Dundalk

1264–1801
- Seats: 2
- Replaced by: Dundalk

Dundalk was a constituency represented in the Irish House of Commons until its abolition in 1801.

== History ==
In the Patriot Parliament of 1689 summoned by James II, Dundalk was represented with two members.

== Members of Parliament, 1264–1801 ==
- 1560: Christopher More and Patrick Stanley
- 1585: Richard Bellew, Thomas Bathe and John Monye
- 1613–1615: William Cashell and Richard Ellis
- 1634–1635: Peter Clynton and Oliver Cashell
- 1639–1649: Oliver Cashell (expelled and replaced 1642 by Francis Moore. Moore died and replaced 1644 by John Hatch) and Nicholas Smyth (died and replaced 1644 by John Stoyte)
- 1661–1666: Wolstan Dixie and Nicholas Combes

=== 1689–1801 ===
Election	First MP	Second MP
1689	Robert Dermott	John Dowdall
1692	Thomas Perceval	William Shaw
1695	Thomas Perceval	Kilner Brasier
1703	Henry Bellingham	James Somerville
1707	Henry Bellingham	Richard Tisdall
1713	Henry Bellingham	Henry Brooke
1715	James Hamilton	Henry Brooke
1719	Henry Morrison	Henry Brooke
1721	James Tisdall	Henry Brooke
1727	Thomas Fortescue	Hans Hamilton
1728	Thomas Fortescue	John Hamilton
1757	Thomas Fortescue	James Fortescue
May 1761	James Smyth (Note: Also elected for Antrim in 1761, for which he chose to sit)	Robert Waller
1761	David La Touche	Robert Waller
1768	William Henry Fortescue (Note: Also elected for Monaghan Borough in 1768, for which he chose to sit)	Robert Waller
1769	James Smyth	Robert Waller
1771	James Sheil	Robert Waller
1776	William Conyngham	Robert Waller
1781	William Conyngham	Robert Lindsay
1783	Viscount Jocelyn	Hon. George Jocelyn
1798	John Jocelyn	Hon. George Jocelyn
1799	John Jocelyn	John Straton
1801	Succeeded by the Westminster constituency Dundalk	

== Bibliography ==
- O'Hart, John (2007). The Irish and Anglo-Irish Landed Gentry: When Cromwell came to Ireland. Vol. II. Heritage Books. ISBN 978-0-7884-1927-0.
- Leigh Rayment's historical List of Members of the Irish House of Commons. Cites: Johnston-Liik, Edith Mary (2002). The History of the Irish Parliament 1692-1800 (6 volumes). Ulster Historical Foundation.
