= Henry Bellingham (disambiguation) =

Henry Bellingham, Baron Bellingham (born 1955) is a British politician who sits in the House of Lords and was formally MP for North West Norfolk.

Henry Bellingham may also refer to:

- Henry Bellingham (c. 1564–1637), English MP for Chichester
- Sir Henry Bellingham, 1st Baronet (died 1650), English MP for Westmorland
- Henry Bellingham (Irish politician) (died 1676), Anglo-Irish soldier and politician
- Henry Bellingham (died 1755), Anglo-Irish politician
- Sir Henry Bellingham, 4th Baronet (1846–1921), British MP for County Louth, Lord Lieutenant of Louth
