= Richard Dawson (Irish politician, died 1766) =

Irish Member of Parliament

Richard Dawson of Dawson Grove, County Monaghan (c. 1693 – 29 December 1766) was an Irish Member of Parliament.

== Biography ==
Dawson was a banker at Dublin and an alderman of Dublin Corporation. He sat in the Irish House of Commons for St Canice from 1727 to 1760 and for Monaghan from 1761 until his death. By his wife Elizabeth, daughter of John Vesey, Archbishop of Tuam, he was the father of Thomas Dawson, 1st Viscount Cremorne.

Parliament of Ireland
Preceded by Sir Standish Hartstonge; Sir Robert Maude	Member of Parliament for St Canice; 1727–1760; With: James Agar 1727–1733; Richard Reade 1734; Hervey Morres 1734–1757; Viscount Moore 1757–1758; Eland Mossom 1759–1760	Succeeded by Eland Mossom; Thomas Waite
Preceded by William Blair; Oliver Anketell	Member of Parliament for Monaghan; 1761–1766; With: William Henry Fortescue	Succeeded by William Henry Fortescue; Richard Power
