= Proleek Dolmen =

- Dolmain Phroilíg (Irish)
- The Giant's Load; Proleek Cromlech
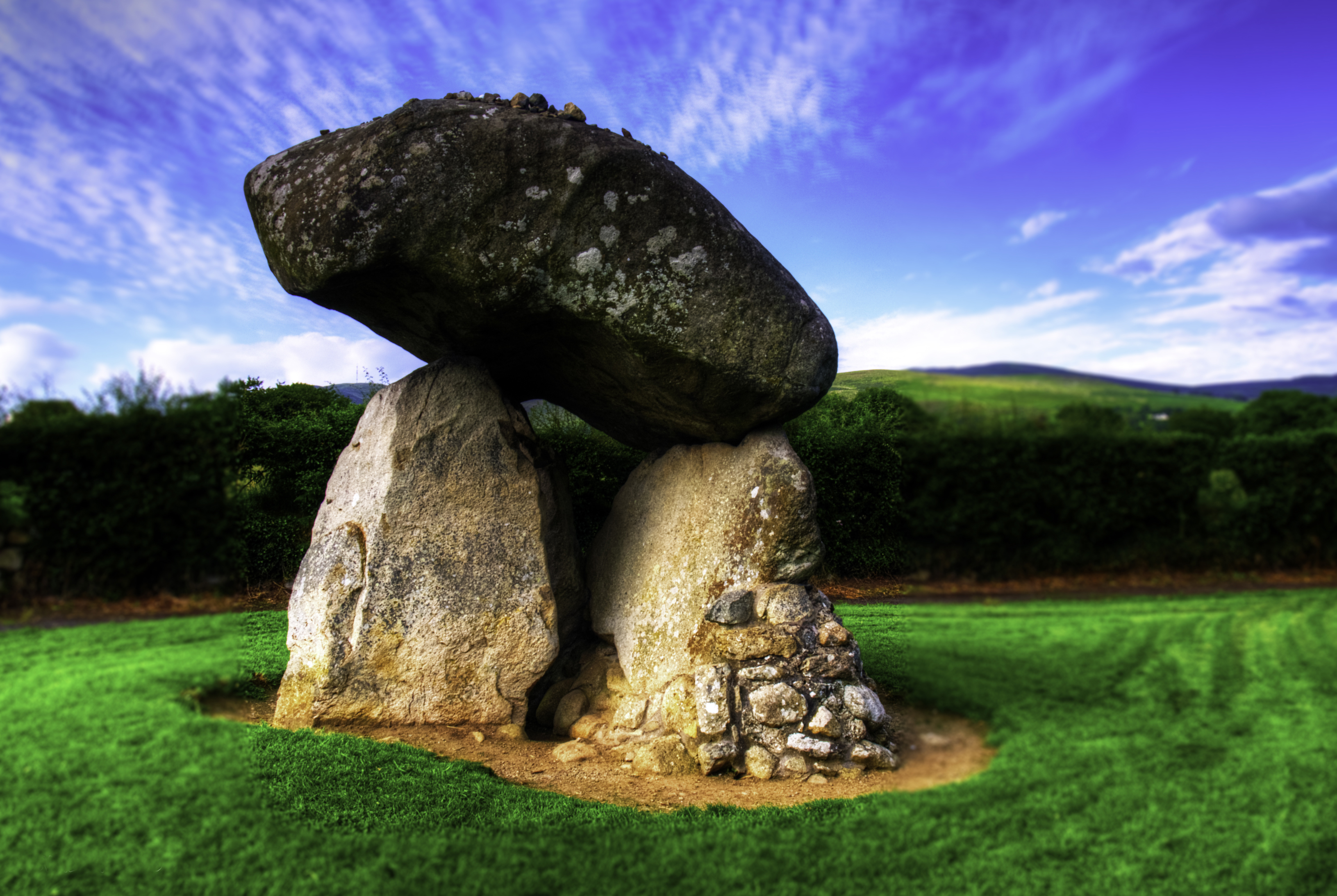
- The dolmen in 2012

- Location in Ireland
- 54.037200°N 6.348270°W
- Type: Dolmen
- Location: Proleek, Ravensdale, County Louth, Ireland

History
- Built: c. 3000 BC

Site notes
- Elevation: 21 m (69 ft)
- Height: 4 m (13 ft)
- Area: Cooley Peninsula

National monument of Ireland
- Official name: Proleek
- Reference no.: 476

Proleek Dolmen is a dolmen (portal tomb) and national monument in County Louth, Ireland.

== Location ==
Proleek Dolmen is 4.3 km (2.7 mi) northeast of Dundalk, on the west bank of the Ballymascanlan River.

== History ==
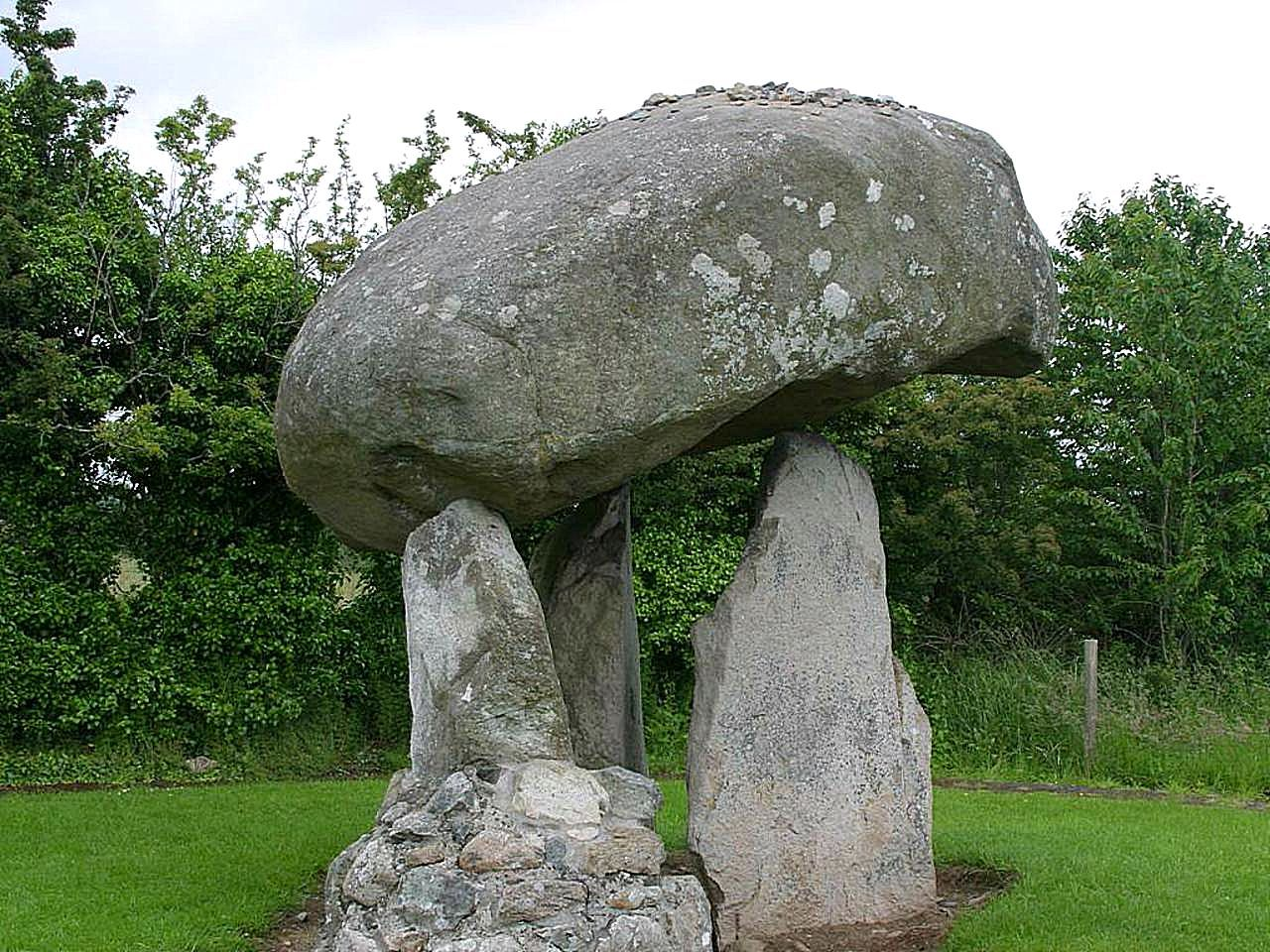
Another view

The dolmen dates to the Neolithic, around 3000 BC. It was used for interments in which the cremated remains were placed in the tomb, often accompanied by grave goods, including tools, beads and pottery. The tomb may be aligned so that its portal points towards Slieve Gullion and/or the setting sun at the summer solstice.

Local legend claims that the dolmen was carried here by the Scottish giant Para Buidhe Mór Mhac Seoidin (or Parrah Boug MacShagean; "Great Yellow Para, son of Seoidín"). Para challenged Fionn mac Cumhaill to combat, but Fionn poisoned the nearby river and Para drank from it. The Scottish giant was buried at the wedge tomb nearby. Another local tradition claims that if a visitor lands three stones atop the dolmen, they will be granted a wish, or will be married within the year.

== Description ==
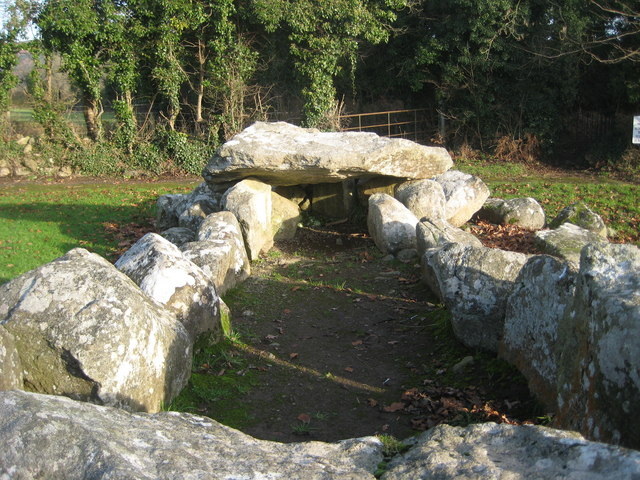
The Giant's Grave nearby

Proleek dolmen is composed of two portal stones, a lower backstone and a massive capstone, which weighs about 40 tonnes. The portal faces northwest.

90 metres (100 yd) to the south-east is a wedge-shaped gallery grave ("Giant's Grave") with a 6.7 m (22 ft) gallery.
