= Chichester Parkinson-Fortescue, 1st Baron Carlingford =

British politician (1823–1898)

The Right Honourable The Lord Carlingford KP PC
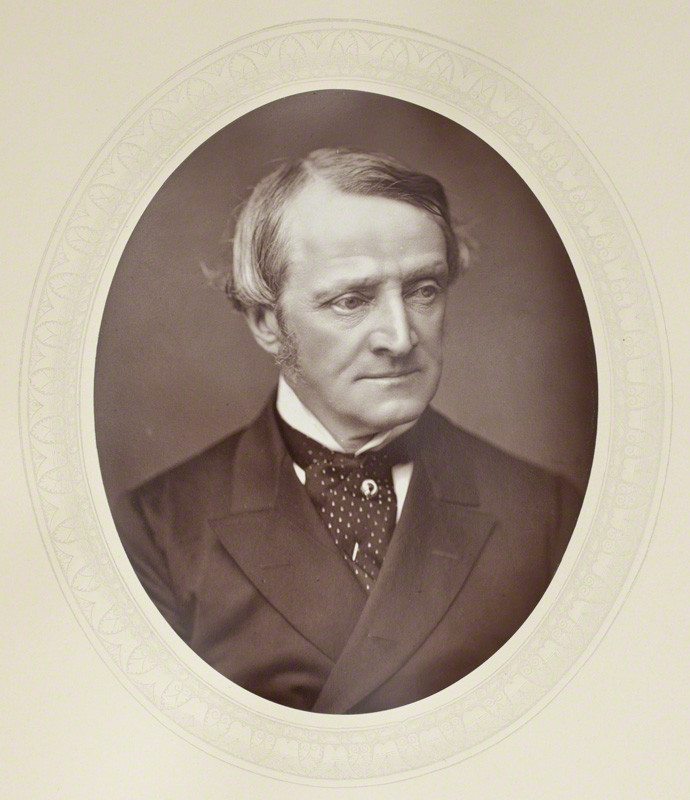

Lord President of the Council
- In office 19 March 1883 – 24 June 1885
- Monarch: Victoria
- Prime Minister: William Ewart Gladstone
- Preceded by: The Earl Spencer
- Succeeded by: The Viscount Cranbrook

President of the Board of Trade
- In office 14 January 1871 – 17 February 1874
- Monarch: Victoria
- Prime Minister: William Ewart Gladstone
- Preceded by: John Bright
- Succeeded by: Sir Charles Adderley

Personal details
- Born: 18 January 1823 Glyde, County Louth
- Died: 30 January 1898 (aged 75) Marseille, France
- Party: Liberal later Liberal Unionist
- Spouse(s): Frances Braham (1863-1879)
- Education: Christ Church, Oxford

Chichester Samuel Parkinson-Fortescue, 2nd Baron Clermont and 1st Baron Carlingford KP PC (18 January 1823 – 30 January 1898), known as Chichester Fortescue until 1863 and as Chichester Parkinson-Fortescue between 1863 and 1874 and Lord Carlingford after 1874, was a British Liberal politician of the 19th century.

== Background and education ==
Born Chichester Fortescue, Carlingford was the son of Chichester Fortescue (died 1826), Member of Parliament for Hillsborough in the Irish Parliament. He came of an old Anglo-Irish family settled in Ireland since the days of Sir Faithful Fortescue (1581–1666), whose uncle, The 1st Baron Chichester, was Lord Deputy. The history of the family was written by his elder brother, Thomas Fortescue, who in 1852 was created Baron Clermont. His mother was Martha Angel, daughter of Samuel Meade Hobson. The future Lord Carlingford was educated at Christ Church, Oxford, where he took a first in Classics (1844) and won the chancellor's English essay (1846). In 1863, he assumed by Royal Licence the additional surname of Parkinson as heir to his aunt's husband, William Parkinson Ruxton.

== Political career ==
In 1847, the then Chichester Fortescue was elected to Parliament for Louth as a Liberal. He became a junior Lord of the Treasury in 1854 under Lord Palmerston, a post he held until 1855, and was later Under-Secretary of State for the Colonies under Palmerston between 1857 and 1858 and 1859 and 1865. He was admitted to the Imperial Privy Council in 1864 and the following year he was made Chief Secretary for Ireland under Lord Russell, a post which he again occupied under William Ewart Gladstone from 1868 to 1871 (this time with a seat in the Cabinet). In 1866, he was also admitted to the Irish Privy Council. He was then President of the Board of Trade between 1871 and 1874. In the latter year he was elevated to the peerage as Baron Carlingford, of Carlingford in the County of Louth.

Lord Carlingford later served under Gladstone as Lord Privy Seal between 1881 and 1885 and as Lord President of the Council between 1883 and 1885. In 1882, he was appointed a Knight of the Order of St Patrick. He parted from Gladstone on the question of Irish Home Rule, but in earlier years he was his active supporter on Irish questions.

== Personal life ==
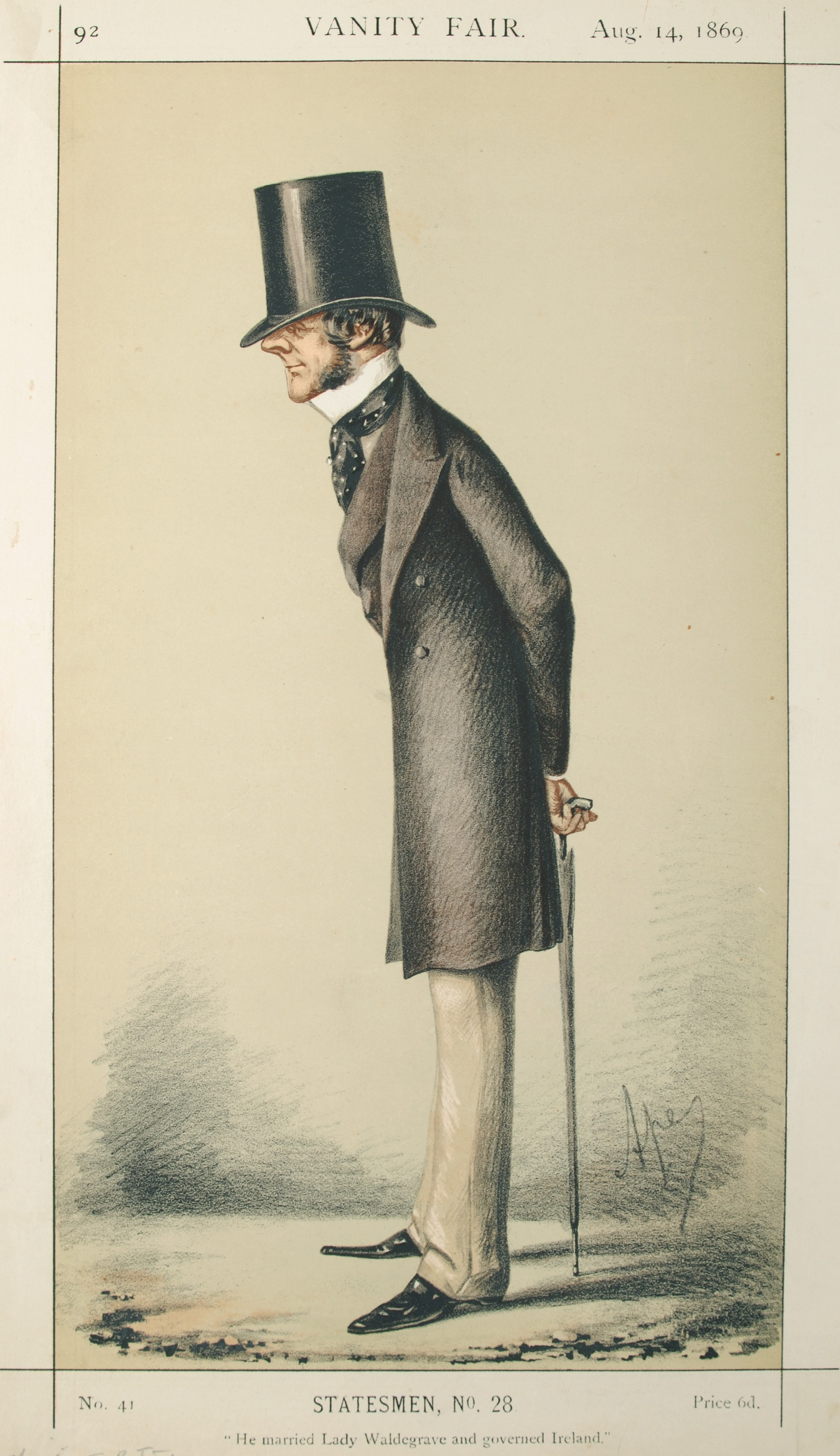
Lord Carlingford caricatured by Ape in Vanity Fair, 1869

Lord Carlingford married Frances Elizabeth Anne, Countess Waldegrave, daughter of John Braham, in 1863. She had been married three times before, the second time to The 7th Earl Waldegrave. There were no children from the marriage. Carlingford's influence in society was due largely to her. She died in July 1879, aged 58.

In 1887, Carlingford's brother, Lord Clermont, died, and Carlingford inherited his peerage according to a special remainder, after which he was known as Lord Carlingford and Clermont.

He died at Marseille, France, in January 1898, aged 75. Both his titles became extinct on his death for lack of heirs as his marriage had produced no children.

== Arms ==
Coat of arms of Chichester Parkinson-Fortescue, 1st Baron Carlingford

Notes
Granted 9 November 1861 by Sir John Bernard Burke, Ulster King of Arms
Crest
1st an heraldic tiger Proper supporting with his forepaw a plain shield Argent charged on the shoulder with a crescent Sable for difference (Fortescue) 2nd a falcon wings addorsed Proper belled Or and charged on the breast with a pellet in the beak an ostrich feathers Argent (Parkinson) on an escroll the motto (Si Celeres Quatit Pennas).
Escutcheon
Quarterly 1st & 4th Azure a bend engrailed Argent cotised Or a crescent for difference (Fortescue) 2nd & 3rd per chevron Gules and Azure on a chevron engrailed Argent between three ostrich feathers erect of the third as many pellets (Parkinson).
Supporters
Same as Lord Clermont, duly differenced.
Motto
Forte Scutum Salus Ducum (English, "A strong shield is the safeguard of our leaders")

== Sources ==
- Matthew, H. C. G. "Fortescue, Chichester Samuel Parkinson-, Baron Carlingford and second Baron Clermont (1823–1898)". Oxford Dictionary of National Biography (online ed.). Oxford University Press. doi:10.1093/ref:odnb/9938. (Subscription, Wikipedia Library access or UK public library membership required.)
- Rigg, James McMullen (1901). "Fortescue, Chichester Samuel" . In Lee, Sidney (ed.). Dictionary of National Biography (1st supplement). London: Smith, Elder & Co.

Parliament of the United Kingdom
Preceded by Thomas Vesey Dawson and Richard Bellew	Member of Parliament for County Louth; 1847 – 1874; With: Richard Bellew to 1852; Tristram Kennedy 1852–1857; John McClintock 1857–1859; Richard Montesquieu Bellew 1859–1865; Tristram Kennedy 1865–1868; Matthew O'Reilly Dease 1868–1874	Succeeded by Alexander Martin Sullivan and Philip Callan
Political offices
Preceded by John Ball	Under-Secretary of State for the Colonies; 1857 – 1858	Succeeded by The Earl of Carnarvon
Preceded by The Earl of Carnarvon	Under-Secretary of State for the Colonies; 1859 – 1865	Succeeded by William Edward Forster
Preceded by Sir Robert Peel, Bt	Chief Secretary for Ireland; 1865 – 1866	Succeeded by Lord Naas
Preceded by John Wilson-Patten	Chief Secretary for Ireland; 1868 – 1871	Succeeded by Marquess of Hartington
Preceded by John Bright	President of the Board of Trade; 1871 – 1874	Succeeded by Sir Charles Adderley
Preceded by The Duke of Argyll	Lord Privy Seal; 1881 – 1885	Succeeded by The Earl of Rosebery
Preceded by The Earl Spencer	Lord President of the Council; 1883 – 1885	Succeeded by The Viscount Cranbrook
Honorary titles
Preceded by Sir Thomas Western, Bt	Lord Lieutenant of Essex; 1873 – 1892	Succeeded by The Lord Rayleigh
Peerage of the United Kingdom
New title	Baron Carlingford; 1874–1898	Extinct
Peerage of Ireland
Preceded by Thomas Fortescue	Baron Clermont; 1887–1898	Extinct
