= Jenkinstown =

Jenkinstown could refer to several places:

- Jenkinstown, County Louth, a town in County Louth, Ireland
- Jenkinstown Park, a parkland in County Kilkenny, Ireland
- Jenkinstown, a hamlet located in the town of Gardiner, New York, USA
- Jenkinstown, North Carolina, USA, an unincorporated community
