= Clermont Carn =

Mountain in County Louth, Ireland

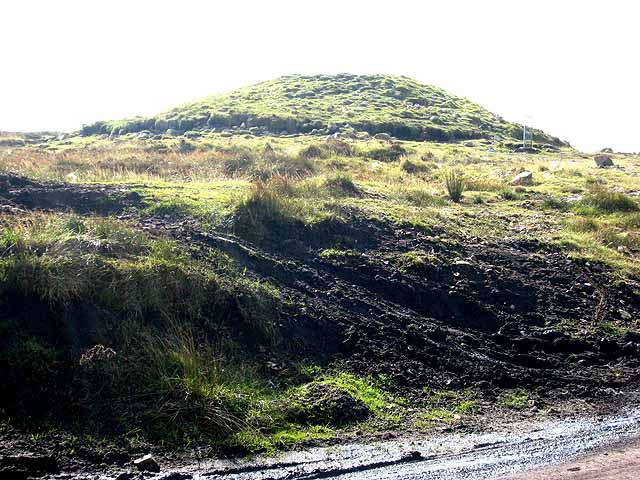
- Clermont Carn summit.

Highest point
- Elevation: 510 m (1,670 ft)
- Prominence: 312 m (1,024 ft)
- Coordinates: 54.0801°N 6.3215°W

Naming
- Native name: Carnán Mhaighréid Náir

Geography
- Location within island of Ireland
- Location: County Louth, Ireland
- Parent range: Cooley Mountains

Clermont Carn (Irish: Carnán Mhaighréid Náir, meaning 'cairn of noble Margaret'), also known as Black Mountain, is a mountain that rises to 510 metres (1,670 ft) in the Cooley Mountains of County Louth, Ireland. It is at the border with Northern Ireland, and is also the location of the Clermont Carn transmission site. The mountain's name refers to an ancient burial cairn on its summit, and to Lord Clermont of Ravensdale.

== Cairn ==
The 'carn' in the mountain's name refers to an ancient burial monument on its summit, also known as 'Black Mountain Chambered Cairn' or 'Ravensdale Park Cairn'. This cairn is 21 m (69 ft) in diameter and over 4 m (13 ft) high, with the remains of another trapezoidal cairn 3.5 m (11 ft) long in the southwest part. Three lintels are in position and the rear part is corbelled. Surrounding this was a court (5.5 × 7 m) and a gallery containing at least two burial chambers.

It was built in the early Neolithic, c. 4000–3500 BC, and forms part of the Clyde-Carlingford group of court cairns. In recent decades the site has been disturbed by quarrying and blasting. It is a protected National Monument.

== Transmission site ==
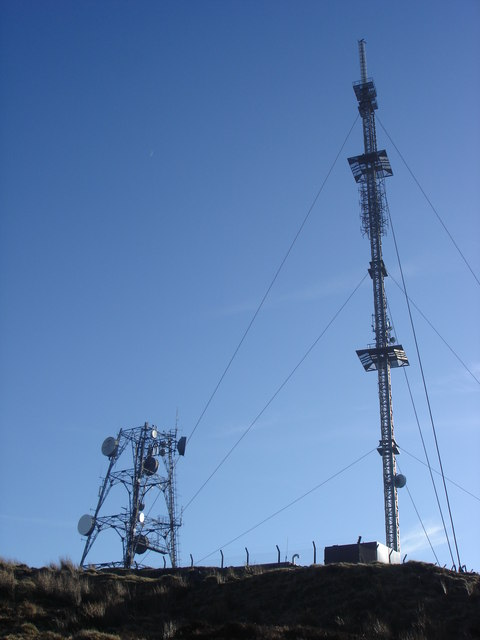
The links tower and transmitter mast

The Clermont Carn transmission site is situated at the summit of Clermont Carn and was opened in 1981 to provide UHF television coverage for the northeast of the Republic of Ireland, counties Louth, Meath, and North County Dublin.

With the site being less than two kilometres (1.2 mi) from the border it was clear that this transmitter would be used to provide RTÉ services into Northern Ireland. Initially the two channels RTÉ One and RTÉ2 were carried on Ch52 and Ch56 with TV3 on Ch66 and TG4 on Ch68 following later. FM radio transmission was also added providing coverage of the five national channels to its service area, and in 1982, a 2M Amateur Radio Repeater was installed. In 2002, a new 120-metre-tall (390 ft) cable-stayed mast was erected and this greatly improved coverage into Northern Ireland. The original self-supporting tower was truncated, and is now only used for microwave links and the Amateur Radio Repeater.

Digital terrestrial television (DTT) trials started in 2008, and in common with all 2RN transmitters in Ireland, analogue television transmissions from this site ended on 24 October 2012. Uniquely, Clermont Carn is the only main television transmitter in Ireland that is vertically polarised, and does not service any relay transmitters. Today the Irish digital television service Saorview is broadcast from here to a sizeable area including a large tract of Northern Ireland, with a good signal being received in Belfast and beyond. This overspill has been welcomed by the UK's Ofcom who have provided information for viewers in Northern Ireland about receiving the RTÉ channels and TG4 both from within Northern Ireland on the UK's Freeview service, and via the Saorview overspill.

== Current Transmissions ==
=== Digital television ===
Frequency	UHF	ERP	Multiplex	Pol
642 MHz	42	160 kW	2RN 1	V
666 MHz	45	160 kW	2RN 2	V

=== Analogue television ===
All services ceased 24 October 2012. (PAL-I UHF)

Frequency	UHF	kW	Service
719.25 MHz	52	250 kW	RTÉ One
751.25 MHz	56	250 kW	RTÉ Two
831.25 MHz	66	250 kW	TV3
847.25 MHz	68	250 kW	TG4

=== Digital Radio ===
Ceased on 31 March 2021.

Frequency	Block	kW	Operator
227.360 MHz	12C	5 kW	DAB Ireland Mux 1

=== FM radio ===
Frequency	ERP	Service
87.8 MHz	40 kW	RTÉ Radio 1
95.2 MHz	40 kW	RTÉ lyric fm
97.0 MHz	40 kW	RTÉ 2fm
102.7 MHz	40 kW	RTÉ Raidió na Gaeltachta
105.5 MHz	80 kW	Today FM
107.9 MHz	4 kW	Newstalk

=== Amateur radio ===
Frequency	ERP	Service
145.675 MHz (Output) 145.075 MHz (Input) CTCSS 110.9 Hz	15 W	EI2CCR 2m 12.5 kHz Repeater (Dundalk Amateur Radio Society www.ei7dar.com)

== Gallery ==
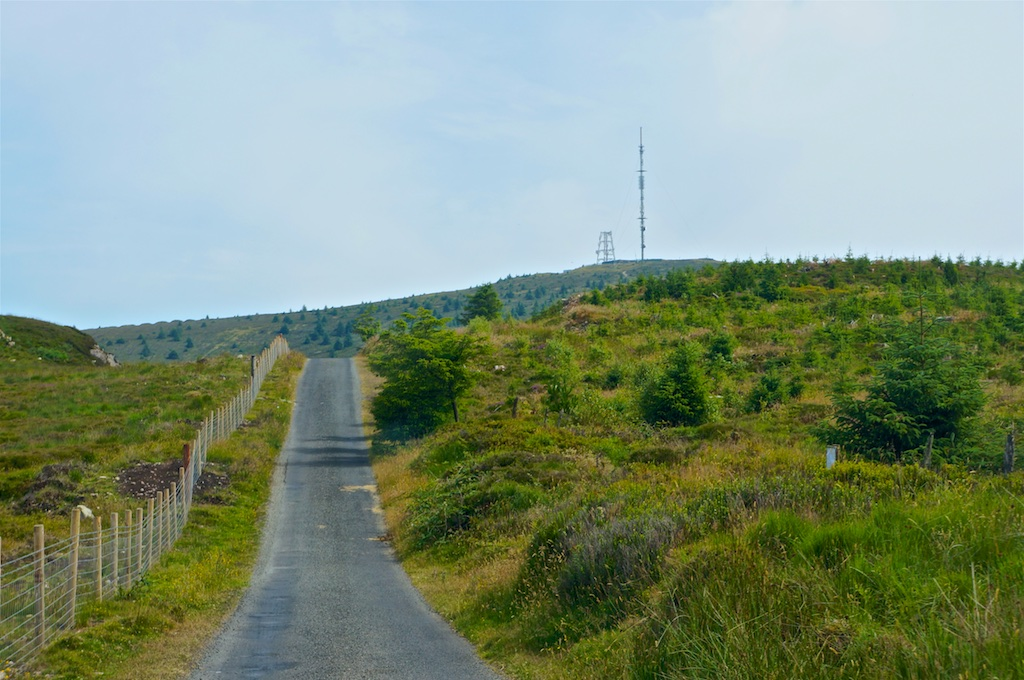
Approach road to Clermont summit

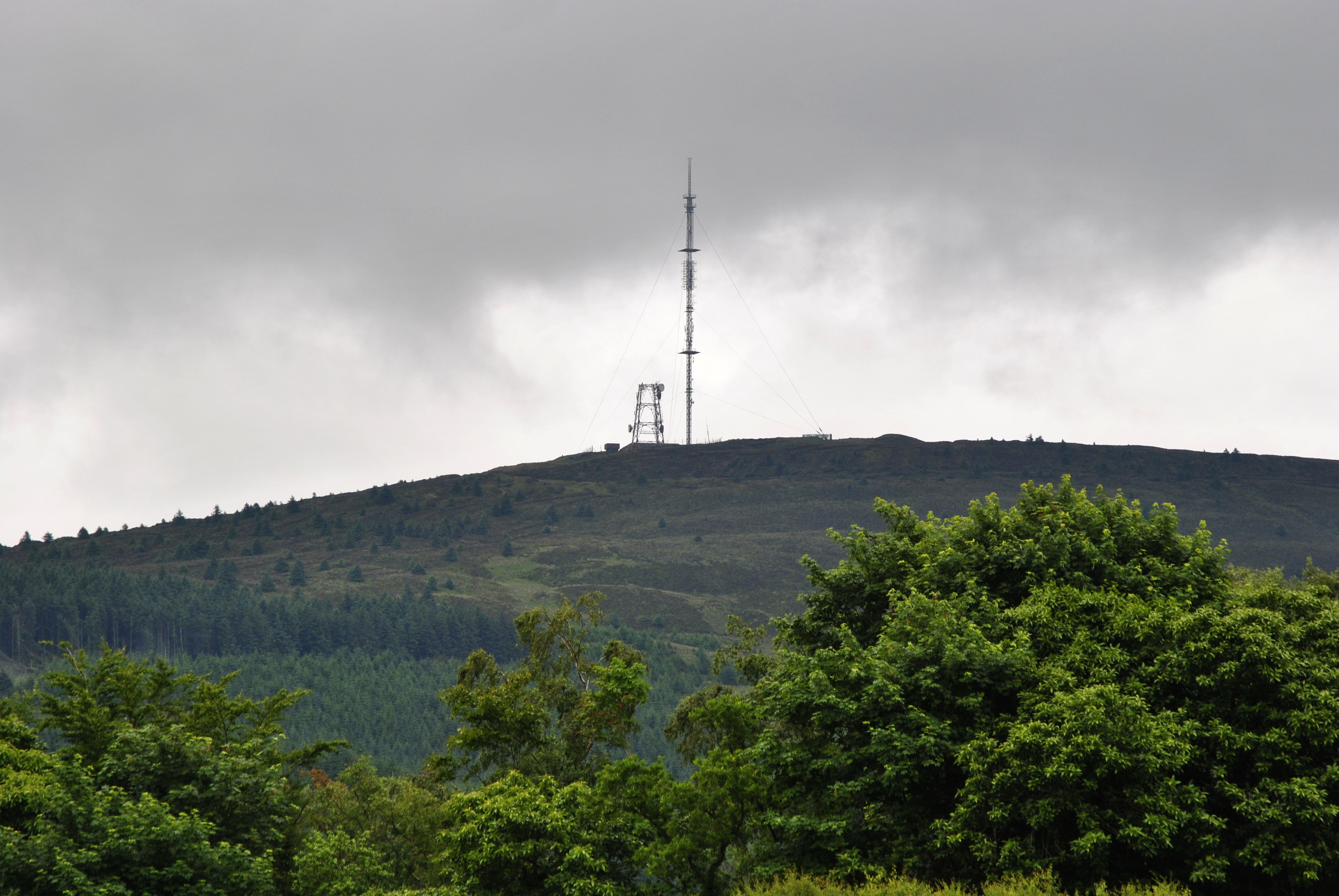
Summit seen from Church Hill Road Jonesborough County Armagh

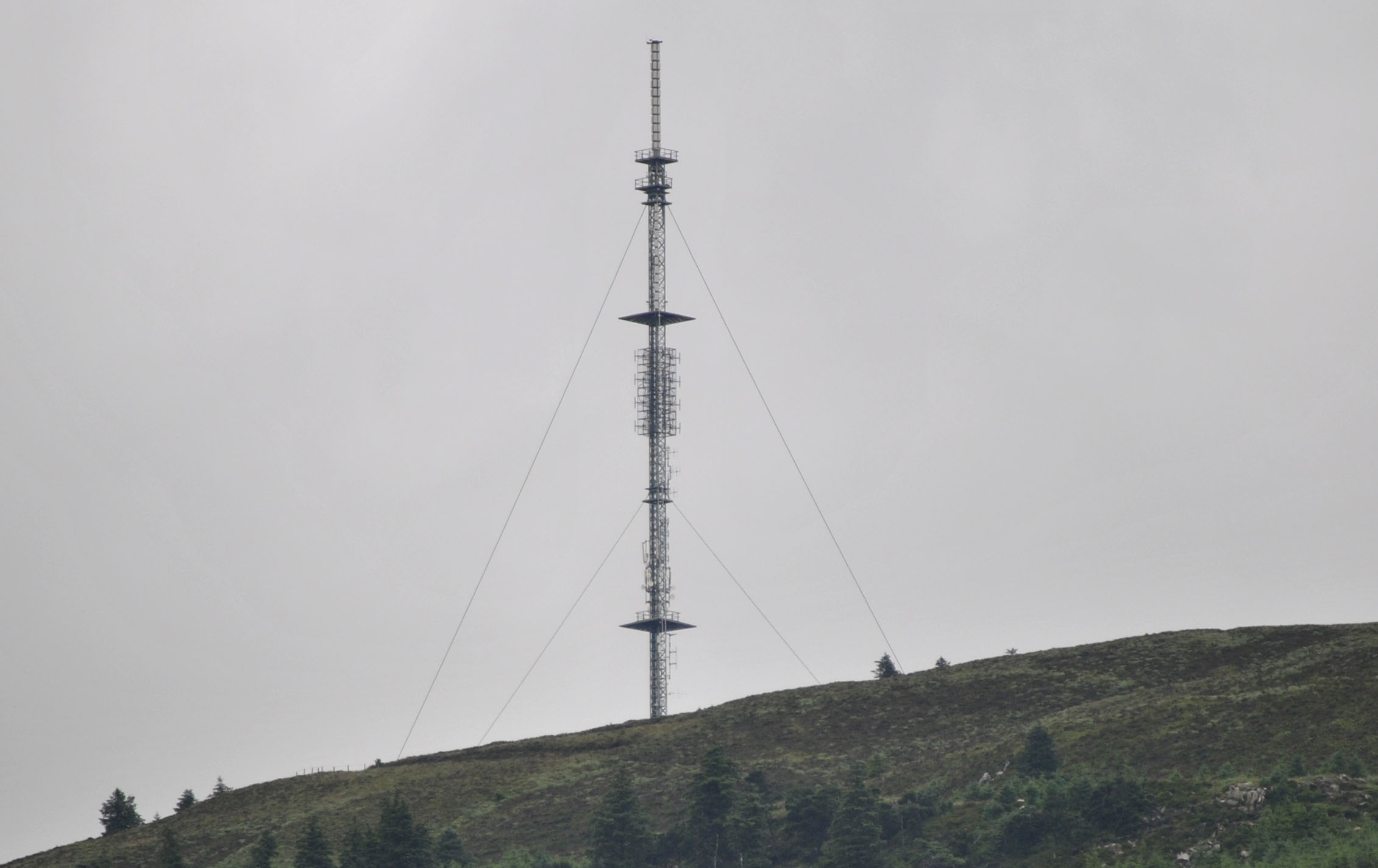
Mast seen from the N1 road

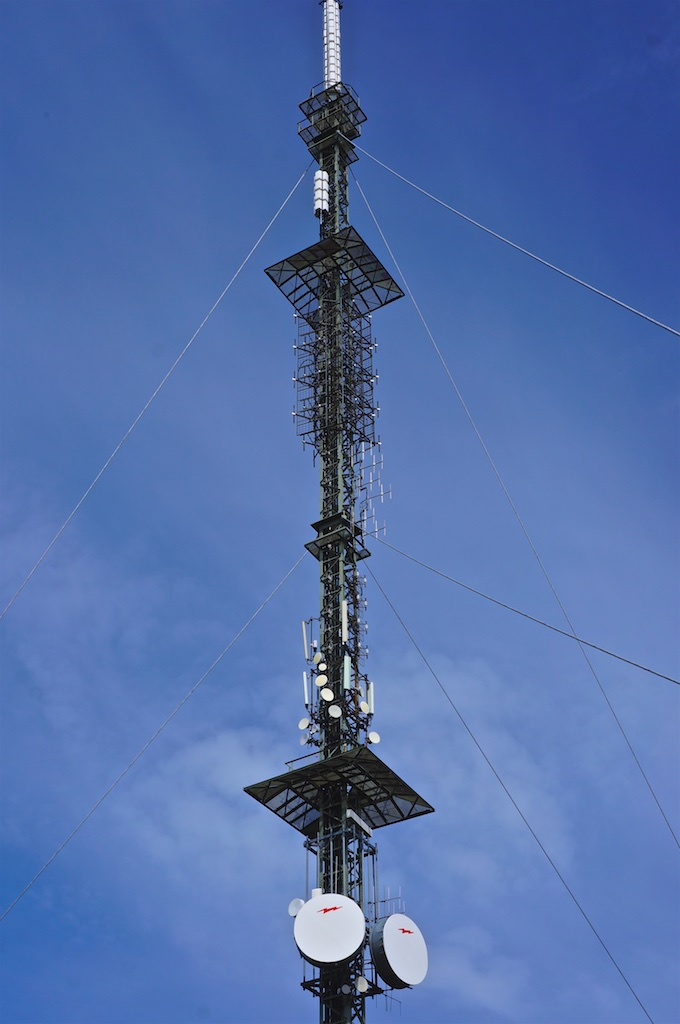
Top of mast

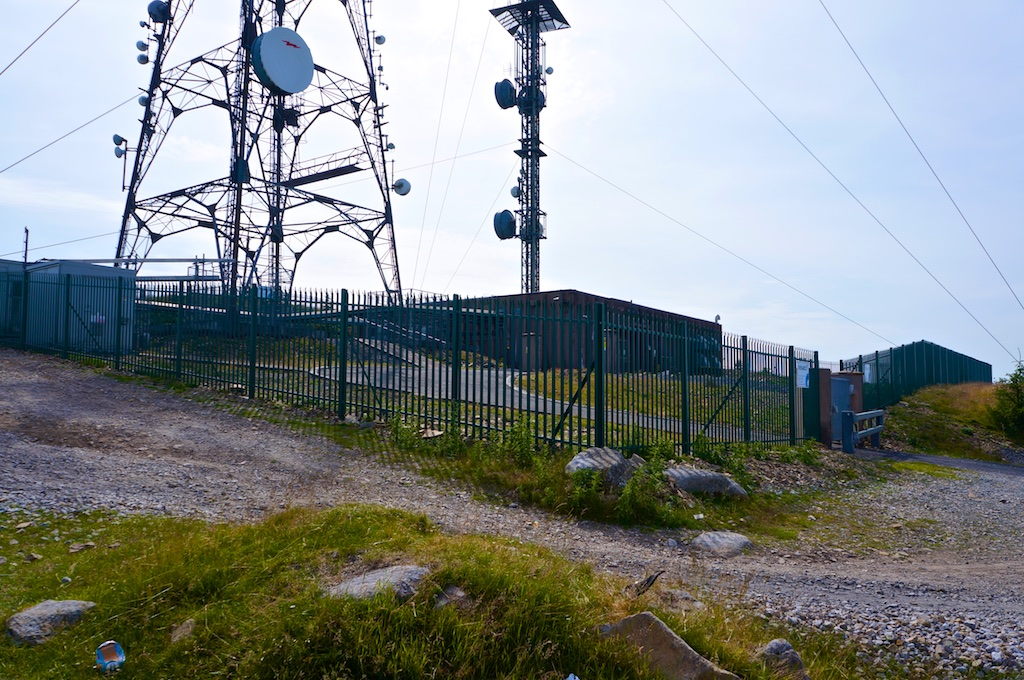
The transmitter building
