= Jenkinstown, County Louth =

Village in County Louth, Ireland

Jenkinstown Irish: Baile Sheinicín
- Village
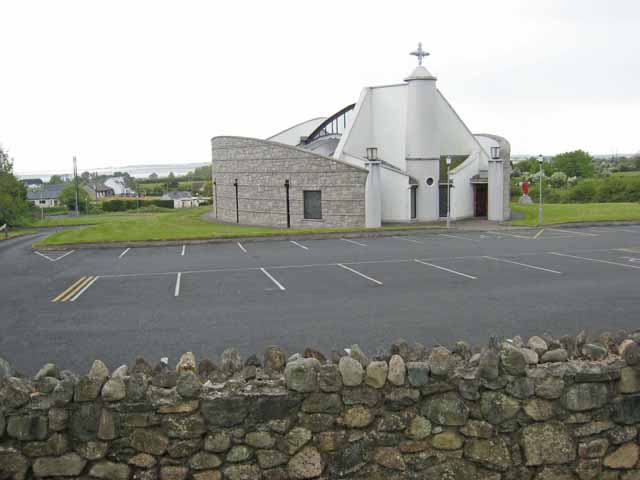
- Our Lady of the Wayside Church at Jenkinstown Cross

- Location in Ireland
- Coordinates: 54°01′06″N 6°17′58″W
- Country: Ireland
- Province: Leinster
- County: County Louth

Population (2022)
  - Total: 360

Jenkinstown (Irish: Baile Sheinicín) is a village and townland in the Municipal District of Dundalk, County Louth, Ireland on the Cooley Peninsula.

The population is concentrated in the townlands of Annaloughan, Rockmarshall, Loughanmore, Slievenaglogh and the eponymous townland of Jenkinstown.

Neighbouring villages include Ballymascanlan in the west, Ravensdale in the north, and Rathcor in the north and east. The area of Jenkinstown is bounded by the mountains of Glenmore to the north and Dundalk Bay to the south. The Little River, a tributary of Castletown River, forms the northeastern boundary.

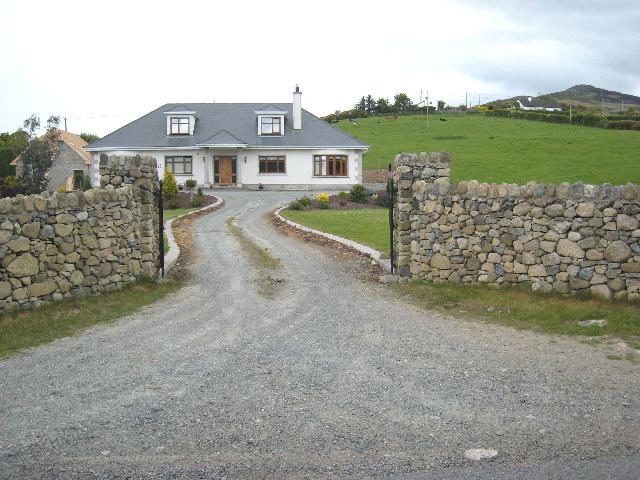
Bungalow in Jenkinstown and Round Mountain

Notable elevations within the village area are the Round Mountain near its western boundary, Annaloughan Mountain, and Slievenalogh. The main road is R173, which is joined by R174 in Rockmarshall townland. The abandoned Dundalk, Newry and Greenore Branch of the LNWR passed through Jenkinstown.

Jenkinstown Crossroads is at the centre of the village, where one can go north up to the Long Womans Grave and the Magic Hill, or south past Jenkinstown Church. Also nearby is Fitzpatrick's Bar and Restaurant, which was included in the Michelin Eating Out Guide 2010.

== See also ==
- List of towns and villages in Ireland
- Lordship, County Louth
