= William Fortescue, 1st Earl of Clermont =

Irish politician

The Right Honourable William Fortescue KP
- Earl of Clermont
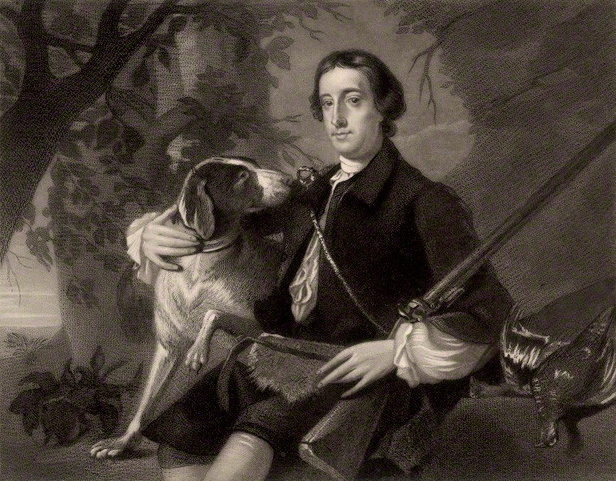
- William Fortescue, 1st Earl of Clermont (1722–1806), mezzotint engraving of portrait by Thomas Hudson (1701–1779).

- Coat of arms
- Tenure: 1777–1806 (as Earl of Clermont); 1776–1806 (as Viscount Clermont and Baron Clermont (2nd creation)); 1770–1806 (as Baron Clermont (1st creation))
- Predecessor: New creation
- Successor: William Fortescue, 2nd Viscount Clermont (as Viscount Clermont and Baron Clermont (2nd creation))
- Other titles: Viscount Clermont; Baron Clermont (1st creation); Baron Clermont (2nd creation)
- Born: 5 August 1722
- Died: 30 September 1806 (aged 84)
- Spouse: Frances Cairnes Murray
- Issue: Louisa Fortescue
- Father: Thomas Fortescue
- Mother: Elizabeth Hamilton

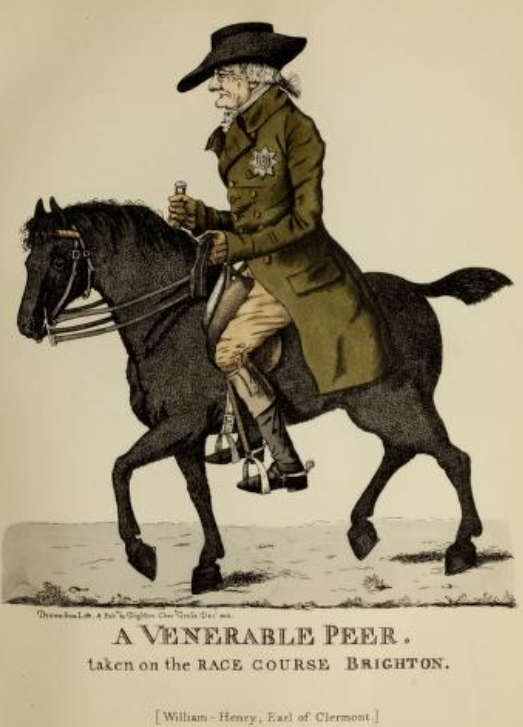
William Fortescue, 1st Earl of Clermont, 1802 caricature.

Arms of Fortescue: Azure, a bend engrailed argent, plain cotised or

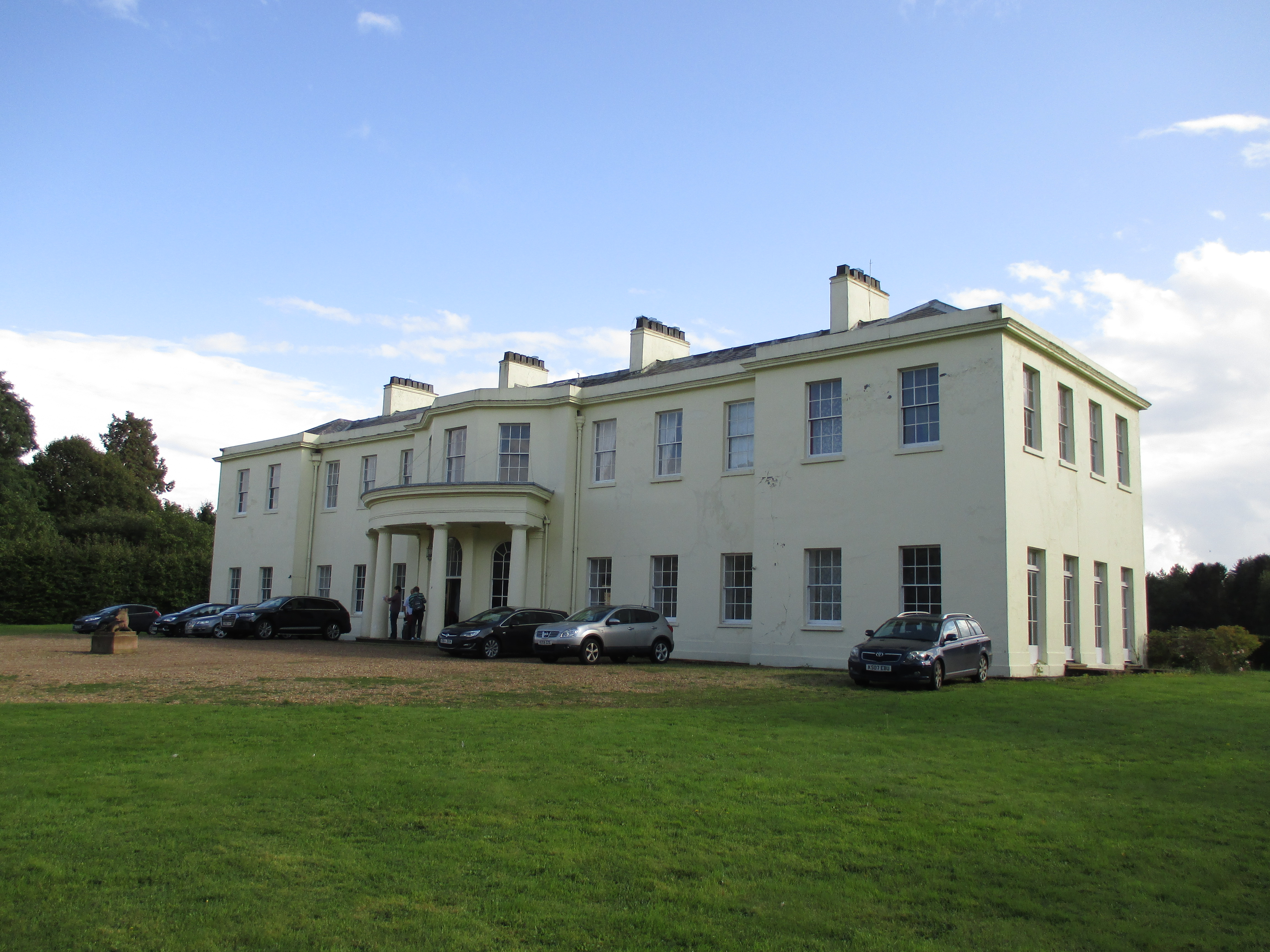
Clermont Hall in the parish of Little Cressingham, Norfolk, originally built as a shooting lodge by the 1st Earl of Clermont and extended by his nephew Viscount Clermont.

William Henry Fortescue, 1st Earl of Clermont, KP (5 August 1722 – 30 September 1806), was an Irish peer and politician.

== Origins ==
He was the eldest son of Thomas Fortescue (1683–1769), a Member of Parliament for Dundalk. His younger brother was James Fortescue, MP and Privy Counsellor.

== Career ==
He served as High Sheriff of Louth in 1746. He represented County Louth in the Irish House of Commons from 1745 to 1760 and subsequently the borough of Monaghan from 1761 to 1770. In 1768 he sat briefly as Member of Parliament for Dundalk before opting to sit for Monaghan Borough, for which he had also been elected. He was appointed Governor and Custos Rotulorum of County Monaghan for life in 1775, standing down just before his death in 1806. He was created Earl of Clermont in 1777 and a Knight Founder of the Order of St Patrick on 30 March 1795. He was a francophile and it is believed on that account he selected Clermont as the name of his earldom.

He had horseracing interests and his racing silks were all crimson. He was known in racing circles as the Father of the Turf and won the Derby with his horse Aimwell. He had a country estate in Norfolk.

His London townhouse was 44 Berkeley Square in Mayfair, which he purchased from George Finch-Hatton in 1774, after the death of its builder, Lady Isabella Finch (1700–1771), the 7th daughter of Daniel Finch, 7th Earl of Winchilsea. In the early 1960s it became the home of the Clermont Club, an exclusive gambling club, and its basement and garden were occupied until 2018 by the then exclusive nightclub Annabel's.

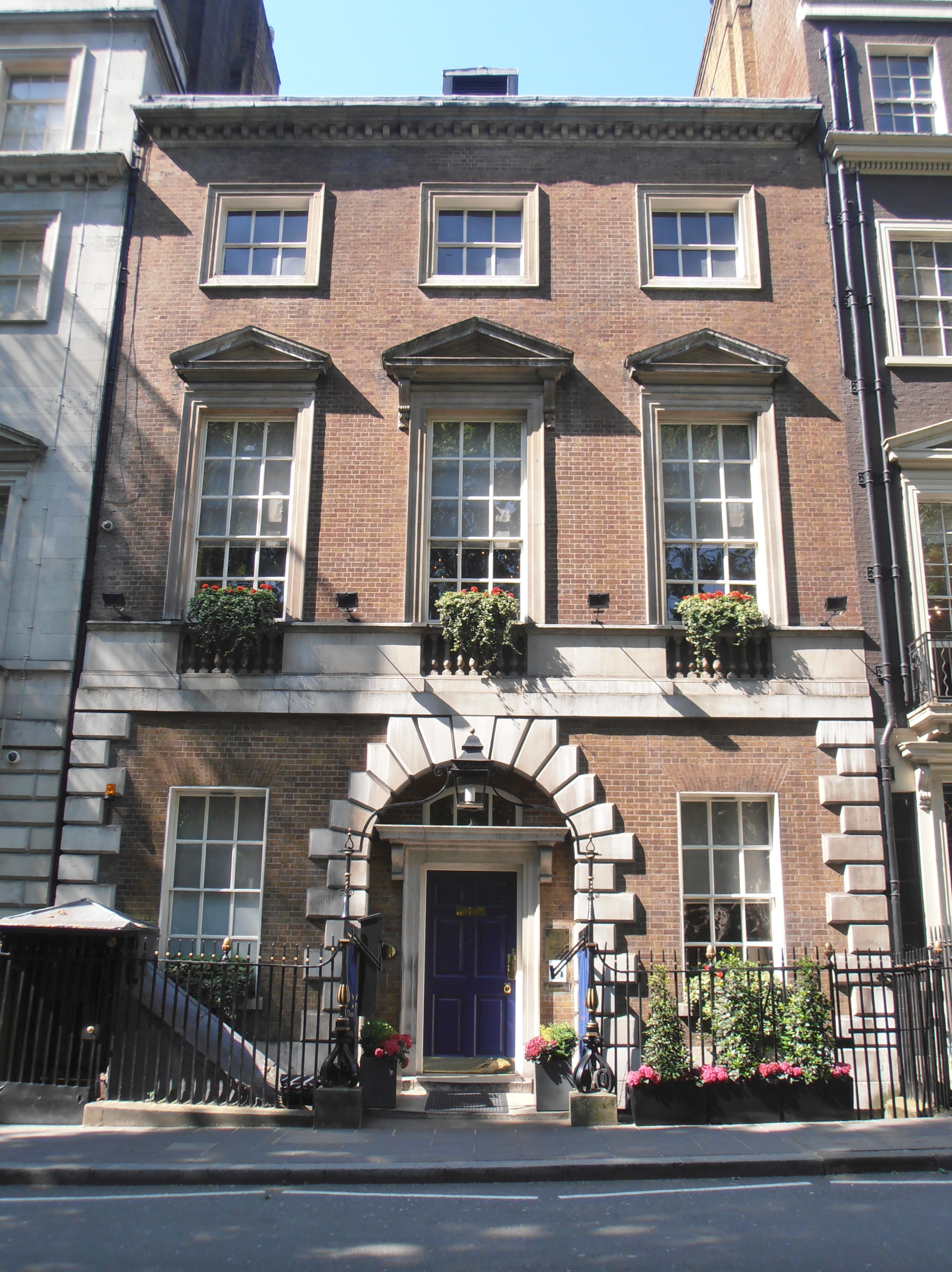
44 Berkeley Square, London, townhouse of Lord Clermont. In the 1960s it became the first home of the Clermont Club, an exclusive gambling club. Until 2018, the basement was the location of the exclusive nightclub Annabel's, operated originally as part of the Clermont Club

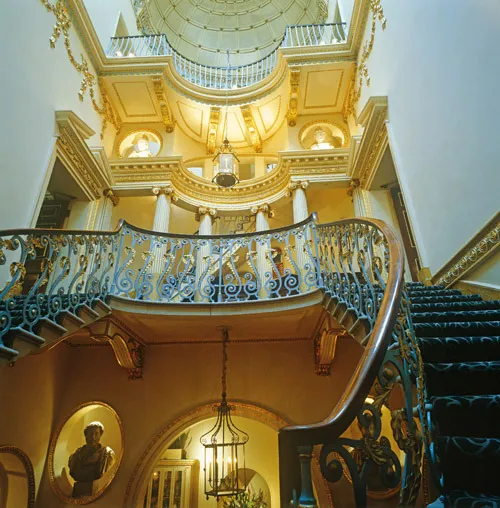
44 Berkeley Square's theatrical stairs by William Kent

== Marriage and progeny ==
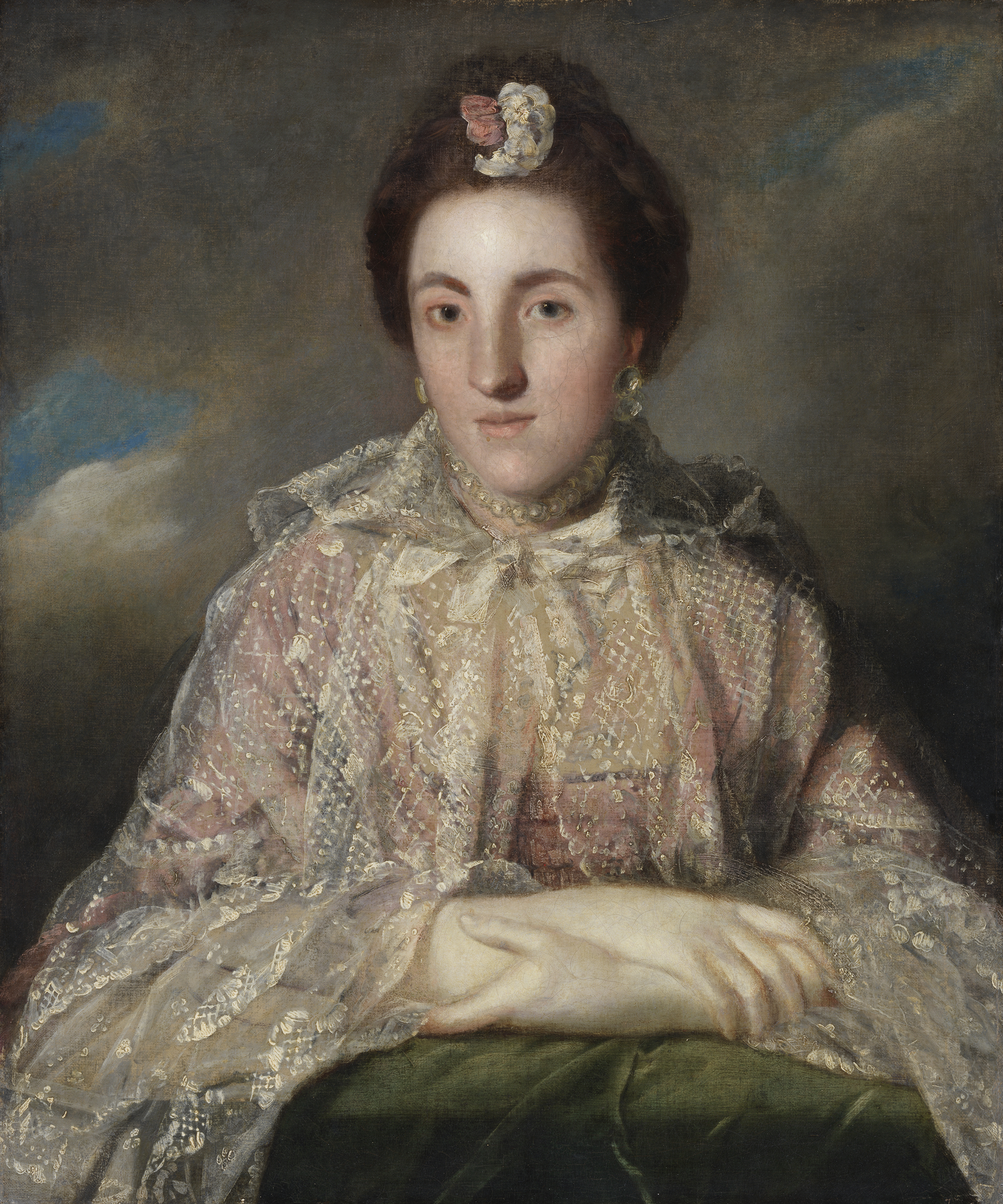
Lady Clermont by Joshua Reynolds c. 1761-1762

He married Frances Cairnes Murray, a daughter and co-heiress of Colonel John Murray, MP for County Monaghan, by whom he had an only daughter:

- Louisa Fortescue.

== Death, burial and succession ==
He died aged 85 at Brighton on 29 September 1806, without male progeny, and was buried at Little Cressingham Church in Norfolk, in which parish was situated Clermont Lodge (now Clermont Hall), his shooting lodge. As he died without male progeny his earldom of Clermont and 1770 barony of Clermont became extinct, whilst his viscountcy and 1776 barony of Clermont were inherited by his nephew William Charles Fortescue, who had been MP for County Louth and then County Louth since 1796.

== Monument in St Andrew's Church, Little Cressingham ==
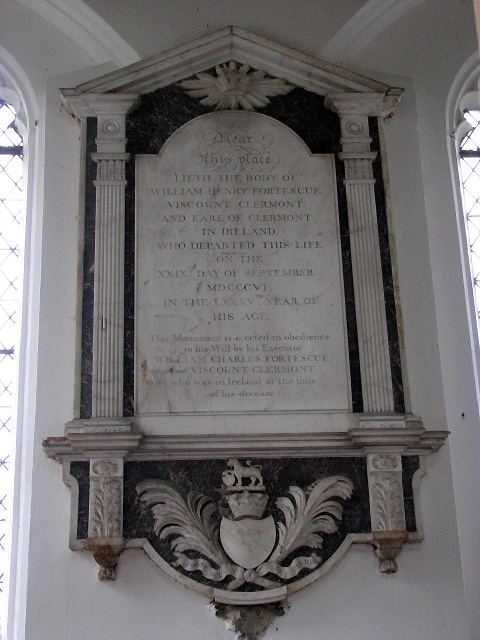
Mural monument to Lord Clermont in St Andrew's Church, Little Cressingham, Norfolk

A mural monument survives in St Andrew's Church, Little Cressingham, inscribed as follows:

Near this place lyeth the body of William Henry Fortescue Viscount Clermont, and Earl of Clermont in Ireland, who departed this life on the 29th day of September, 1806, in the 85th year of his age. This monument is erected in obedience to his will by his executor William Charles Fortescue, now Viscount Clermont, who was in Ireland at the time of his decease.

Parliament of Ireland
Preceded by Henry Bellingham	Member of Parliament for County Louth; 1745–1760; With: Henry Bellingham 1745–1755; Thomas Tipping 1755–1761	Succeeded by Anthony Foster; James Fortescue
Preceded by William Blair; Oliver Anketell	Member of Parliament for Monaghan Borough; 1761–1770; With: Richard Dawson 1761–1767; Richard Power 1767–1768; Robert Cuninghame 1768–1771	Succeeded by Henry Westenra; Robert Cuninghame
Peerage of Ireland
New creation	Earl of Clermont; 1777–1806	Extinct
New creation	Viscount Clermont; 1776–1806	Succeeded by William Fortescue
New creation	Baron Clermont; 2nd creation 1776–1806	Succeeded by William Fortescue
New creation	Baron Clermont; 1st creation 1770–1806	Extinct
