= William Talbot (died 1724) =

Irish Jacobite politician

William Talbot (c. 1643 – 26 December 1724) was an Irish Jacobite politician.

== Biography ==
Talbot was the son of Garrett Talbot and Margaret Gaydon, and a nephew of Richard Talbot, 1st Earl of Tyrconnell. In 1689 he was the Member of Parliament for County Louth in the Patriot Parliament called by James II of England. Upon the death of his uncle in August 1691, he assumed his title as 2nd Earl of Tyrconnell in the Jacobite peerage; a claim never recognised by the English government. Following the Williamite War in Ireland, Talbot was attainted and fled first to France and then to Spain, where he was commonly called Conde de Tyrconnel.

Talbot entered the service of Philip V of Spain and fought in the War of the Spanish Succession. He was aide-de-camp to Philippe II, Duke of Orléans during the Siege of Tortosa (1708).

He married Mary White in May 1689. Their son, Richard Talbot (styled Lord Talbot by Jacobites), married Charlotte, daughter of the 1st Earl of Tyrconnell, in 1702. Talbot's grandson was Richard Francis Talbot.

Parliament of Ireland
Preceded by Henry Bellingham; Sir Thomas Stanley	Member of Parliament for County Louth; 1689; With: Thomas Bellew	Succeeded by Thomas Bellingham; William Tichborne
