= James Hamilton (died 1771) =

Irish landowner and politician

James Hamilton (1685 – November 1771) was an Irish landowner and politician.

== Biography ==
He was the eldest son of Henry Hamilton of Bailieborough, who was killed at the siege of Limerick. Bailieborough had come to the Hamilton family through Henry's mother Jane, daughter of Bishop William Bailie. James's younger brother John was also an MP.

Hamilton was elected to the Irish House of Commons for the borough of Newry in 1723, following the death of Robert Clements. He then represented the borough of Carlow during the long parliament of George II; he had purchased the manor of Carlow from Lord Thomond. He was High Sheriff of Donegal in 1739.

By his wife Anne Hall he had several children, including a third son James who was the father of Hans Hamilton, MP for County Dublin and ancestor of the Lords Holmpatrick.
