= Henry Colley (MP for Monaghan) =

Irish politician

Sir Henry Colley was an Irish politician.

Colley was educated at Trinity College, Dublin.

Colley represented Monaghan Borough from 1613 until 1615.
