= Thomas Fortescue, 1st Baron Clermont =

Irish Whig politician and historian

Arms of Fortescue: Azure, a bend engrailed argent, plain cotised or

Thomas Fortescue, 1st Baron Clermont (9 March 1815 – 29 July 1887) of Ravensdale Park in County Louth, Ireland, was an Irish Whig politician and was the historian of the ancient Fortescue family having 12th century Devonshire origins.

== Origins ==
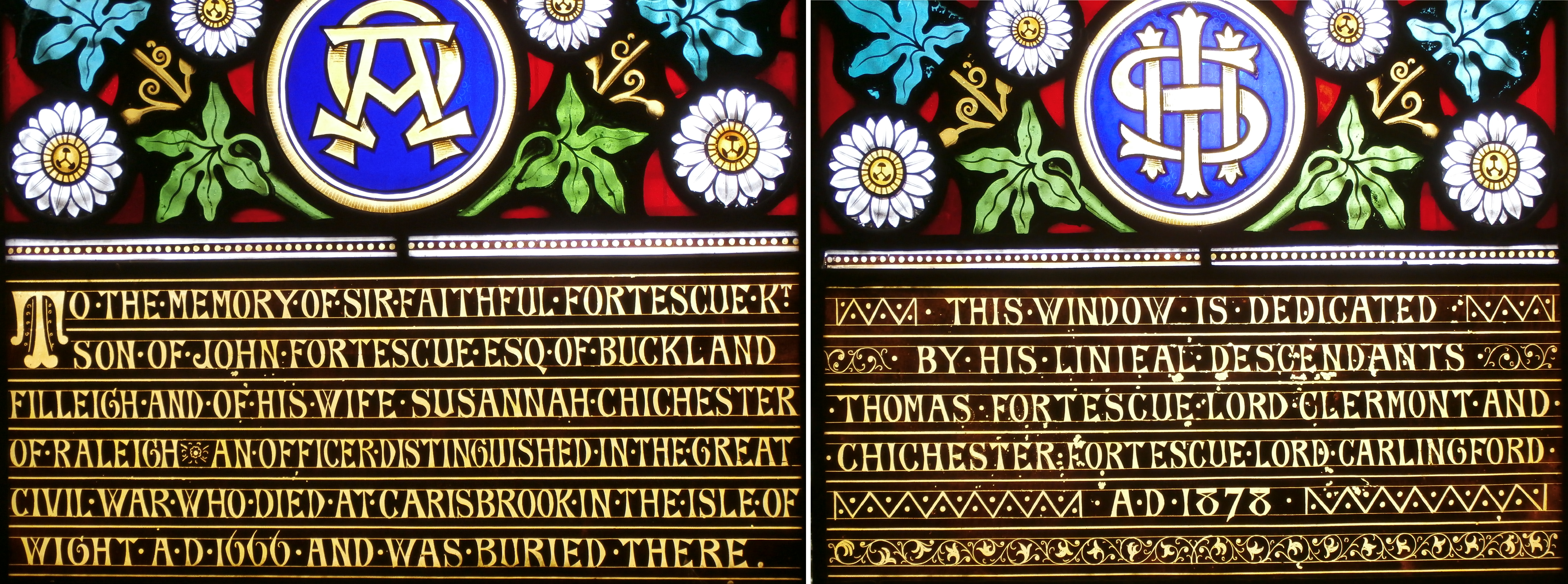
Inscriptions in 1878 stained glass window in Buckland Filleigh Church, Devon, erected jointly by Thomas Fortescue and his younger brother Chichester

He was born on 9 March 1815, the son of Chichester Fortescue (1777–1826) of Dromisken, County Louth, Ireland, by his wife Martha Angel Hobson, a daughter of Samuel Meade Hobson of Muchridge House, County Cork, Ireland, a barrister. His younger brother was Chichester Parkinson-Fortescue, 1st Baron Carlingford (1823-1898). He was a descendant of Chichester Fortescue of Dromisken, whose brother William Fortescue was the grandfather of William Fortescue, 1st Earl of Clermont (1722-1806).

== Career ==
He was educated at Exeter College, Oxford. In 1833 he inherited Ravensdale Park, County Louth, upon the death of Sir Henry James Goodricke, 7th Baronet, son of Sir Henry Goodricke, 6th Baronet by his wife Charlotte Fortescue, sister of the 1st Earl of Clermont. He served as High Sheriff of Louth in 1839. In 1840 he was returned to parliament as one of two representatives for County Louth, a seat he held until 1841. In 1852 he was raised to the Peerage of Ireland as Baron Clermont, of Dromisken in the County of Louth, a revival of the extinct Clermont titles held by his kinsman. The peerage was created with special remainder to his younger brother Chichester Fortescue. In 1866 he was also created Baron Clermont, of Clermont Park in the County of Louth, in the Peerage of the United Kingdom, which entitled him to a seat in the House of Lords. This peerage was created with normal remainder to his heirs male.

== Marriage ==
In 1840 he married Lady Louisa Grace Butler, a daughter of James Butler, 1st Marquess of Ormonde, which marriage was childless. She survived her husband and died at Ravensdale Park in November 1896, aged 80.

== Death and succession ==
He died childless at Ravensdale Park in July 1887, aged 72. His United Kingdom peerage became extinct on his death but he was succeeded in the Irish peerage, in accordance with the special remainder, by his brother Chichester Parkinson-Fortescue, 1st Baron Carlingford, who in 1874 had been elevated to the Peerage of the United Kingdom in his own right as Baron Carlingford.

== History of the Family of Fortescue ==
Lord Clermont wrote the definitive history of the ancient Fortescue family, titled History of the Family of Fortescue in all its Branches, London, 1869; 2nd edition London, 1880. He produced a Supplement in 1885 containing new information following his discovery of two 13th-century Fortescue charters in Eton College library. In the preface to the first edition he wrote of himself:

"It has been his desire, by tracing the various branches of the family to a common ancestor, who lived at the time when the history of Anglo-Norman England may be said to begin, to present it as an ideal whole, taking part through one or more of its members, and to a greater or less extent, in the events of almost every period of the history of our country; not, indeed, with any such prominence as to entitle it to a place among the powerful families of the land, but sufficiently to stamp it as a fair example of a knightly and noble House of England".

In the preface to the second edition he wrote:

"A last reading over of the beginning of the volume induces me to remind the reader that the so-called early history of this family, like that of many others, is really not history at all, not being founded on documentary evidence, but tradition — deserving of credit so far only as it is not contradicted by probability or historic fact. The "Domesday Book" does not record, in any recognizable form, an ancestor of the Fortescues among the persons who received grants of land from William the Conqueror. The residence, therefore, at Wimstone, immediately after the Conquest, of Adam Fortescue, either as a tenant-in-chief or as an under-tenant, must not be unreservedly accepted. If the Fortescues were there at all at that early time, it was probably in some other capacity than that which either of those tenures would imply".

Parliament of the United Kingdom
Preceded by Richard Bellew; Henry Chester	Member of Parliament for County Louth; 1840–1841; With: Richard Bellew	Succeeded by Richard Bellew; Thomas Vesey Dawson
Peerage of Ireland
New creation	Baron Clermont; 1852–1887	Succeeded by Chichester Parkinson-Fortescue
Peerage of the United Kingdom
New creation	Baron Clermont; 1866–1887	Extinct
