= Bellingham =

Bellingham most commonly refers to

- Bellingham, Washington, U.S., a city
- Jude Bellingham (born 2003), English footballer
- Bellingham (surname)

Bellingham may also refer to:

== Places ==
=== Australia ===
- Bellingham, Tasmania, coastal hamlet in Northern Tasmania

=== United Kingdom ===
- Bellingham, London, neighbourhood in the London Borough of Lewisham
  - Bellingham (Lewisham ward), an electoral ward of Lewisham London Borough Council created in 1964
- Bellingham, Northumberland, village

=== United States ===
- Bellingham, Massachusetts, a town in Norfolk County
  - Bellingham High School (Massachusetts)
  - Bellingham (CDP), Massachusetts, a census-designated place within the town
- Bellingham, Minnesota, a city in Lac qui Parle County
- Bellingham, Washington, a city in Whatcom County
  - Bellingham Bay, bay in Washington
  - Bellingham High School (Washington)

== Other uses ==
- Bellingham (surname)
- Bellingham baronets, three baronetcies created for persons with the surname Bellingham, one in the Baronetage of England, one in the Baronetage of Ireland and one in the Baronetage of Great Britain
- Bellingham Bells, a baseball team in Bellingham, Washington
- USS Bellingham (ID-3552), a United States Navy cargo ship in commission from 1918 to 1919
