= John Hampden (1696–1754) =

English politician

Arms of Hampden: Argent, a saltire gules between four eagles displayed azure

John Hampden (c. 1696 – 4 February 1754), of Great Hampden, Buckinghamshire, was an English politician who sat in the House of Commons from 1734 to 1754.

Hampden was the second son of John Hampden, MP, of Great Hampden, and his second wife Anne Cornwallis, second daughter of Hon. Frederick Cornwallis. His father committed suicide in 1696, putting a "sad cloud over the family". He was page of honour of the royal stables in 1712 and became captain in Colonel Sir Robert Rich's regiment of Dragoons in about 1715. He succeeded his brother Richard Hampden at Great Hampden in 1728.

At the 1734 British general election Hampden was returned as a Whig Member of Parliament for Wendover. In 1735 he was granted a lucrative place as commissary general for Gibraltar which he held until 1747. He was returned again as MP for Wendover in 1741 and 1747.

He was a founding governor of London's Foundling Hospital, a charity dedicated to the salvation of the capital's abandoned children.

He married Isabella Ellys, but left no children.

Hampden was the last male-line descendant of John Hampden, and left his estates on his death to his cousin Hon. Robert Trevor, who assumed the Hampden surname.

Parliament of Great Britain
Preceded by The Viscount Limerick; John Hamilton	Member of Parliament for Wendover; 1734–1754; With: John Boteler 1734–35; The Viscount Limerick 1735–41; The 1st Earl Verney 1741–52; The 2nd Earl Verney 1753–54	Succeeded by The 2nd Earl Verney; John Calvert
