= Richard Francis Talbot =

Richard Francis Talbot (December 1710 – 12 March 1752) was a French soldier and diplomat of Irish descent.

Talbot was born in France to Irish exiles, the son of Richard Talbot (son of William Talbot) and Charlotte Talbot (daughter of Richard Talbot, 1st Earl of Tyrconnell). Talbot's paternal grandfather had assumed the title of Talbot's maternal grandfather in 1691, and in 1724 Talbot became the titular Earl of Tyrconnell in Jacobite circles.

In 1721 he joined Fitzjames' Horse, a regiment in the Irish Brigade of the French Royal Army. He was promoted to captain in 1729 and served under James FitzJames, 1st Duke of Berwick in the War of the Polish Succession. He later served in Bavaria, Upper Alsace and Lower Rhine. Talbot was captured by British forces in a ship off the coast of Ostend while attempting to sail to join the Jacobite Rising of 1745, but was later released in a prisoner exchange. He was appointed Maréchal de camp in April 1748 during the Siege of Maastricht and was honoured as a chevalier of the Order of Saint Louis.

After the Treaty of Aix-la-Chapelle, Talbot was named by Louis XV as his ambassador to the Kingdom of Prussia, arriving in Berlin in March 1750. From September 1751 his health declined rapidly and he died in Berlin in March 1752.

He was described by Thomas Carlyle as "a Jacobite Irishman, of blusterous qualities, though with plenty of sagacity and rough sense".
