= Monaghan Borough (Parliament of Ireland constituency) =

Pre-1801 Irish constituency

Monaghan
- Former borough constituency for the Irish House of Commons
- County: County Monaghan
- Borough: Monaghan

–1801
- Replaced by: Disfranchised

Monaghan was a constituency represented in the Irish House of Commons until 1800. Between 1725 and 1793 Catholics and those married to Catholics could not vote.

== Members of Parliament ==
Election	First MP	Second MP
1613	Henry Colley	Thomas Ryves
1634	Richard Blayney	Arthur Blayney
1639	Arthur Culme	William Cadogan
1661	Thomas Vincent	Joseph Fox
1692	Charles Dering	Edward Forde
1695	Charles Dering	Robert Echlin
1703	Sir Thomas Prendergast	Sir Richard Vernon
1710	Sir Alexander Cairnes	Sir Richard Vernon
1713	Francis Lucas	Richard Pockrich
1715	Francis Lucas	Hugh Willoughby
1727	Francis Lucas	Sir Alexander Cairnes
1733	Francis Lucas	Sir Henry Cairnes
1743	Francis Lucas	John Dawson
1747	William Blair	Baptist Johnston
1753	William Blair	Oliver Anketell
1761	William Henry Fortescue	Richard Dawson
1767	William Henry Fortescue	Richard Power
1768	William Henry Fortescue	Robert Cuninghame
1771	Henry Westenra	Robert Cuninghame
1776	James Fortescue	Robert Cuninghame
1777	Robert Dobson	Robert Cuninghame
October 1783	Thomas James Fortescue	Robert Cuninghame
1783	Theophilus Jones	Robert Cuninghame
1791	Cromwell Price	Robert Cuninghame
1796	Cromwell Price	Henry Westenra
January 1798	William Charles Fortescue	Henry Westenra
1798	William Fortescue	Henry Westenra
1800	Faithful William Fortescue	Henry Westenra
1801	Constituency disenfranchised	
