= Slieve Foy =

Mountain in County Louth, Ireland

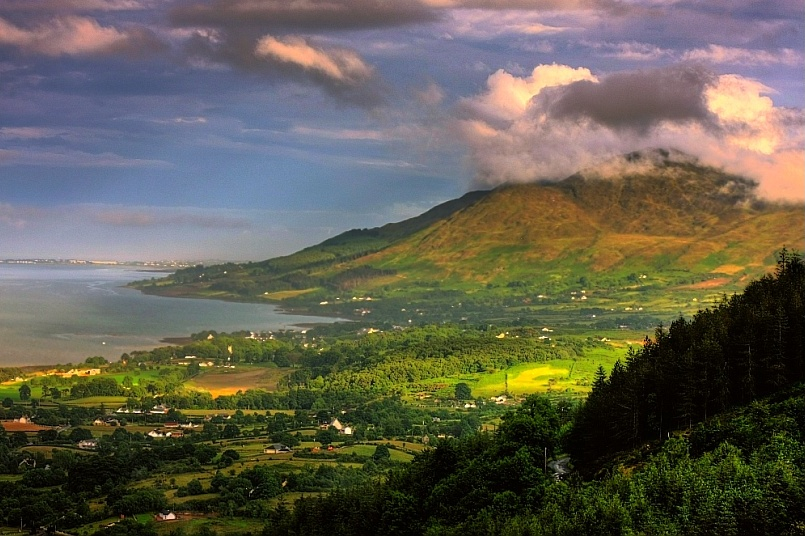
- Slieve Foy from the northwest

Highest point
- Elevation: 589 m (1,932 ft)
- Prominence: 494 m (1,621 ft)
- Listing: County Top (Louth), Marilyn
- Coordinates: 54°02′40″N 6°13′05″W

Naming
- Native name: Sliabh Feá

Geography
- Location within island of Ireland
- Location: County Louth, Ireland
- Parent range: Cooley Mountains
- OSI/OSNI grid: J168119
- Topo map: OSi Discovery 36

Slieve Foy or Slieve Foye (Irish: Sliabh Feá) is a mountain on the Cooley Peninsula in County Louth, Ireland. It rises to 589 metres (1,932 ft), making it the highest of the Cooley Mountains and the highest in Louth. It overlooks Carlingford Lough and the village of Carlingford, and is sometimes called Carlingford Mountain.

== Geography ==
Slieve Foy is one of two ridges which make up the Cooley Mountains and is separated from the rest of the range by the Windy Gap. It is an elongated mountain running northwest–southeast and includes the lesser summits known as The Foxes Rock, The Ravens Rock, The Eagles Rock, and Barnavave.

== Naming ==
The name Sliabh Feá means 'mountain of the woods'. Locally the name is understood as Sliabh Fathaigh, 'mountain of the giant', because its outline is said to resemble a sleeping giant. Local lore has it that the giant Finn McCool, representing summer, stood on the mountain while fighting his rival Ruscaire, representing winter. Finn is said to have beaten Ruscaire by throwing a boulder across the lough at him, which became the Cloughmore (The Big Stone) on Slieve Martin.

The mountain also appears in the Táin Bó Cúailnge (Cattle Raid of Cooley). The army of Queen Medb (Maeve) is said to have dug a pass through the mountain, which became known as Barnavave (Bearna Mhéabha, "Maeve's gap").

== Leprechauns ==
A local businessman began organising leprechaun-related tourist activities in the area in 1989, including a "leprechaun hunt" to find hidden ceramic figures. In 2009, with support from local councillors, the mountain was formally declared a "Designated Area of Protection for Flora, Fauna, Wild Animals and Little People" under the EU Habitats Directive.

== See also ==
- Lists of mountains in Ireland
- List of Irish counties by highest point
- List of mountains of the British Isles by height
- List of Marilyns in the British Isles
