= James Hamilton, 1st Earl of Clanbrassil (second creation) =

British peer and politician

The Right Honourable James Hamilton PC (Ire)
- Earl of Clanbrassil
- Tenure: 1756–1758 (as Earl of Clanbrassil); 1719–1758 (as Viscount of the City of Limerick)
- Predecessor: New creation
- Successor: James Hamilton, 2nd Earl of Clanbrassil
- Born: 14 August 1694
- Died: 17 March 1758 (aged 63)
- Spouse: Lady Harriet Bentinck (m. 1728)
- Issue: James Hamilton, 2nd Earl of Clanbrassil; Lady Anne Hamilton
- Father: James Hamilton
- Mother: Hon. Anne Mordaunt

James Hamilton, 1st Earl of Clanbrassil PC(I) (14 August 1694 – 17 March 1758) was a British politician and peer.

== Early life ==
Hamilton was the son of James Hamilton and Hon. Anne Mordaunt, the daughter of The 1st Viscount Mordaunt.

== Career ==
He first stood for elected office in Ireland, and sat as the Member of the Irish House of Commons for Dundalk between 1715 and 1719. On 13 May 1719, he was created Baron Clanboye and Viscount of the City of Limerick in the Peerage of Ireland. As his titles were in the Irish peerage, he was not barred from election to the House of Commons of Great Britain and served as the MP for Wendover (1735–1741), Tavistock (1741–1747) and for Morpeth (1747–1754). On 14 April 1746, he was invested as a member of the Privy Council of Ireland. On 24 November 1756, he was created Earl of Clanbrassil, also in the Peerage of Ireland, and subsequently served as Governor of County Louth between 1756 and his death in 1758.

== Marriage and issue ==
He married Lady Harriet Bentinck, daughter of William Bentinck, 1st Earl of Portland and Jane Martha Temple, on 15 October 1728. Together they had two children, James and Anne, who married Robert Jocelyn, 1st Earl of Roden. He was succeeded by his only son, James Hamilton.

Parliament of Ireland
Preceded by Henry Bellingham; Henry Brooke	Member of Parliament for Dundalk; 1715–1719; With: Henry Brooke	Succeeded by Henry Brooke; Henry Morrison
Parliament of Great Britain
Preceded by Richard Hampden; Sir Richard Steele	Member of Parliament for Wendover; 1727–1734; With: Richard Hampden 1727–1728; John Hamilton 1728–1734	Succeeded by John Boteler; John Hampden
Preceded by John Boteler; John Hampden	Member of Parliament for Wendover; 1735–1741; With: John Hampden	Succeeded by John Hampden; The Earl Verney
Preceded by Hon. Charles Fane; Lord Sherard Manners	Member of Parliament for Tavistock; 1742–1747; With: The Viscount Fane	Succeeded by Richard Leveson-Gower; Thomas Brand
Preceded by Robert Ord; Sir Henry Liddell	Member of Parliament for Morpeth; 1747–1754; With: Robert Ord	Succeeded by Robert Ord; Thomas Duncombe
Peerage of Ireland
New creation	Earl of Clanbrassil; 2nd creation 1756–1758	Succeeded by James Hamilton
New creation	Viscount of the City of Limerick; 1719–1758	Succeeded by James Hamilton
