= Baile an Fhaoitigh =

Baile an Fhaoitigh may refer to two places in Ireland:

- Ballyneety, a village in County Limerick
- Whitestown, a townland in County Louth; see Dundalk Lower
