= Chichester Fortescue (1777–1826) =

Irish Member of Parliament

Chichester Fortescue (12 August 1777 – 25 November 1826) briefly served as an Irish Member of Parliament.

He was the son of Thomas Fortescue and father of The 1st Baron Clermont and The 1st Baron Carlingford and Harriet Angelina Fortescue.

He was elected to the Irish House of Commons for Hillsborough in January 1800 but lost his seat when the Parliament of Ireland was abolished by the Act of Union 1800.
