= Thomas Fortescue (1744–1799) =

Irish Member of Parliament

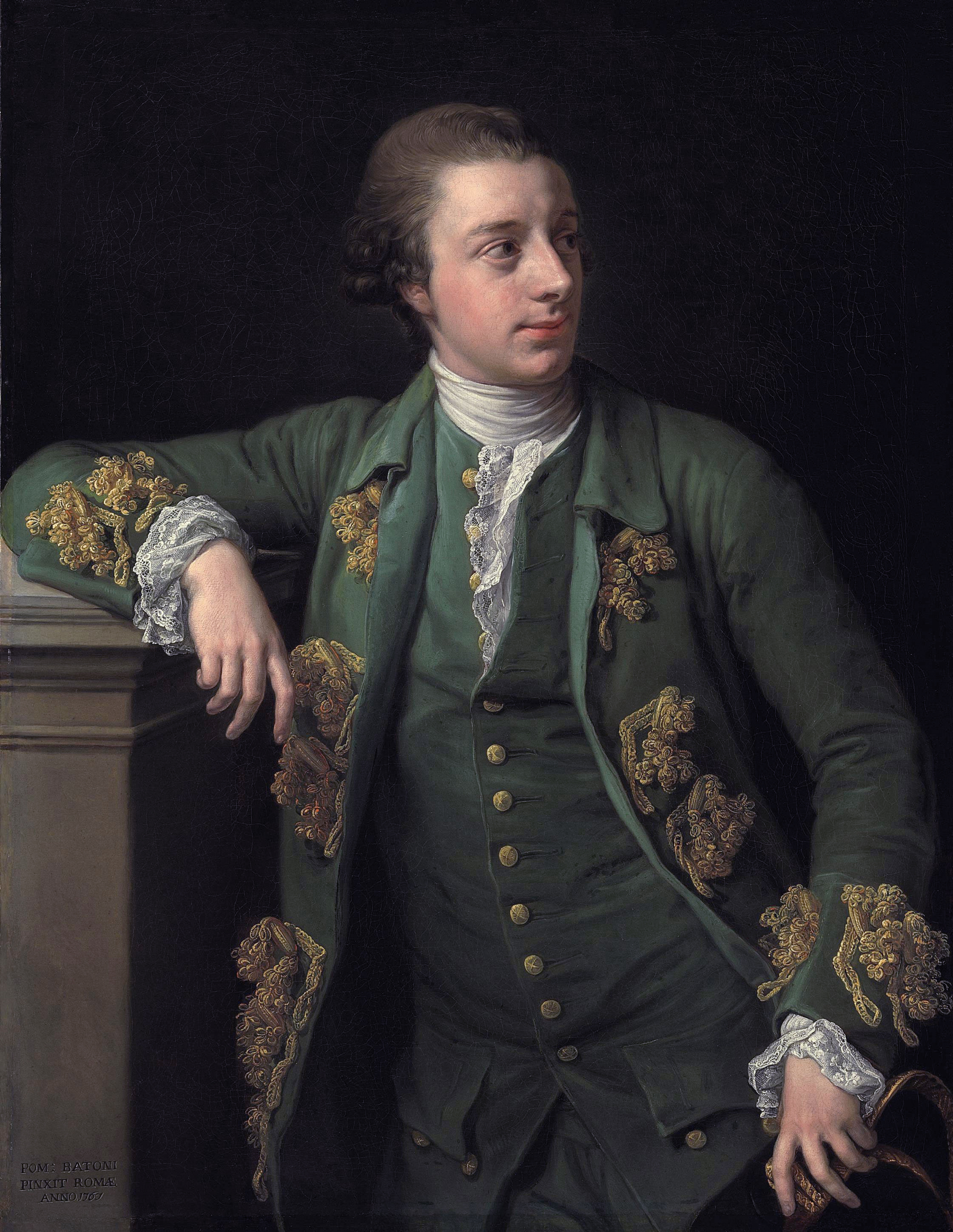
Thomas Fortescu (Pompeo Girolamo Batoni)

Thomas Fortescue (1 May 1744 – 10 December 1779) was an Irish Member of Parliament.

He represented Trim in the Irish House of Commons from 1768 to his death.

He was son of Chichester Fortescue by his wife Elizabeth, daughter of Richard Wesley, 1st Baron Mornington. His son Chichester also served as an MP.
