= Ravensdale, County Louth =

Village in County Louth, Ireland

Ravensdale Gleann na bhFiach
- Townland
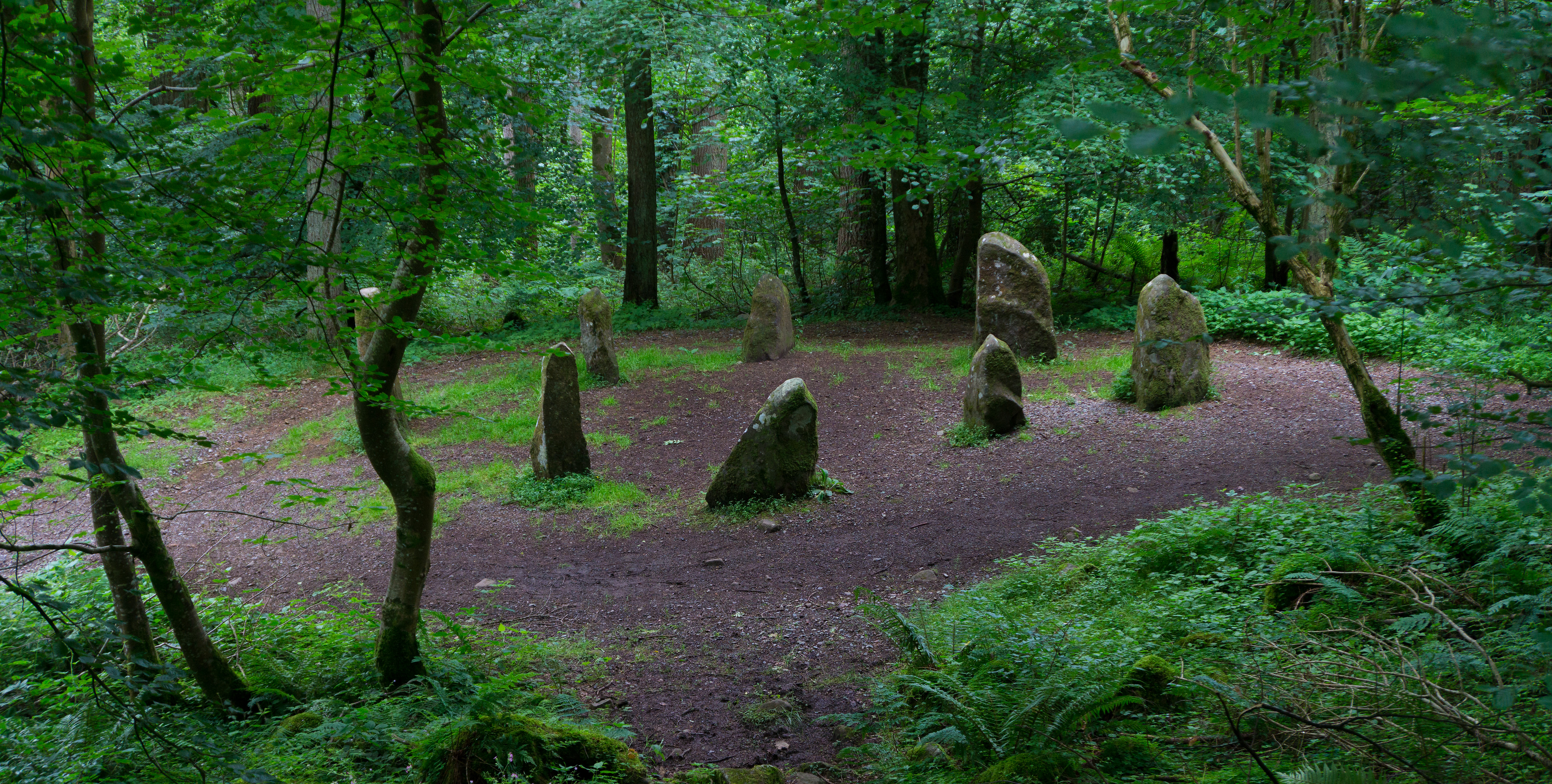
- Standing stones in Ravensdale Forest

- Location in Ireland
- Coordinates: 54°03′08″N 6°20′23″W
- Country: Ireland
- Province: Leinster
- County: County Louth

Government
  - Dáil Éireann: Louth
- Time zone: UTC+0 (WET)
  - Summer (DST): UTC-1 (IST (WEST))
- Area codes: 042, +353 42
- Irish grid reference: J088131

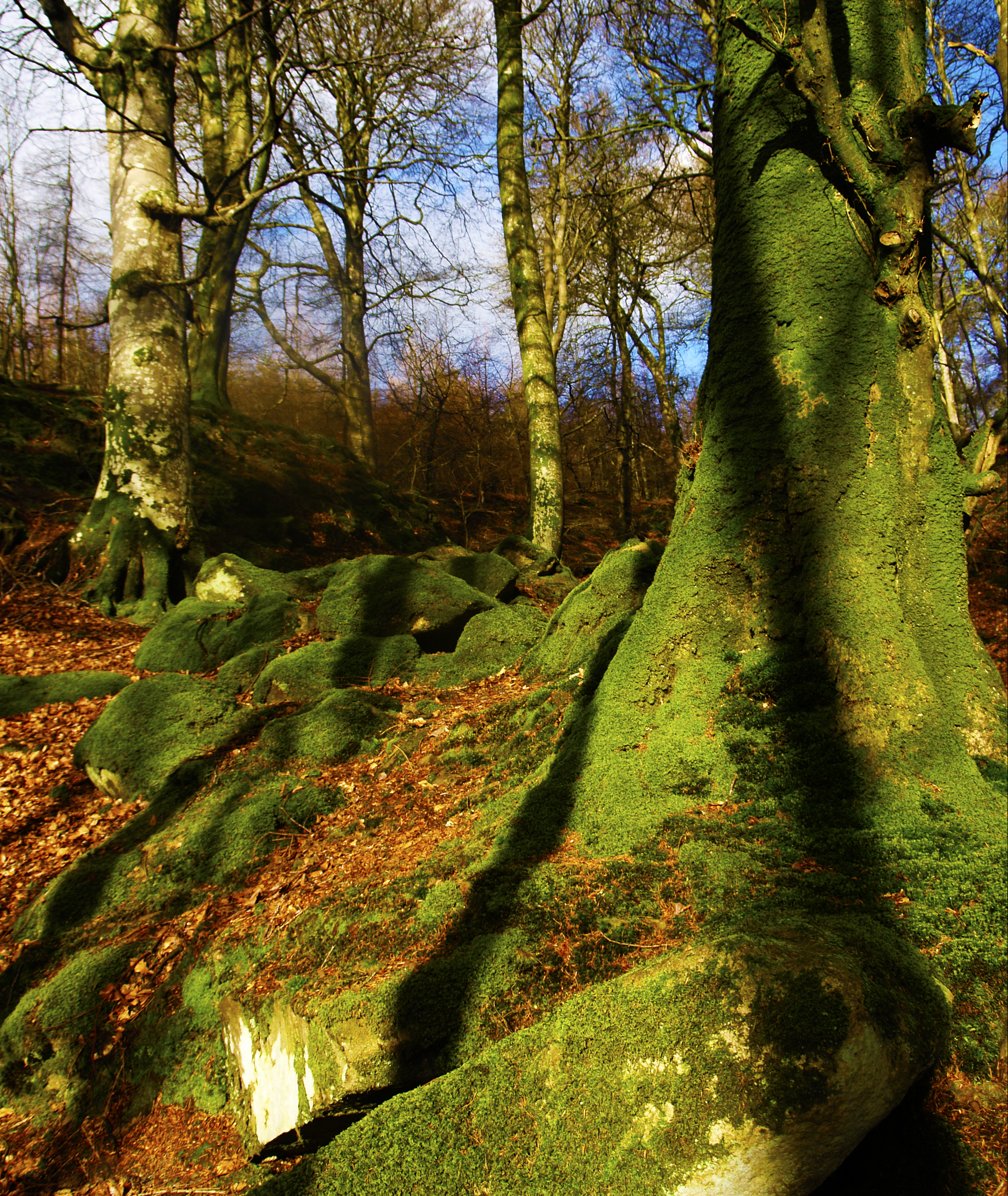
Trees in Ravensdale

Ravensdale (Irish: Gleann na bhFiach) is a village, townland and electoral division located at the foothills of the Cooley Mountains on the Cooley Peninsula in the north of County Louth in Ireland. Bordering with the townland of Doolargy (Irish: An Dúleargaidh), Ravensdale is approximately 8 km to the north of Dundalk. The dual carriageway between Dublin and Belfast runs nearby, and the R174 connects it with Jenkinstown.

A number of public buildings in Ravensdale village, including a now-disused courthouse, former school and Saint Mary's Roman Catholic Church, were originally built in the mid-19th century.

Ravensdale is part of the ecclesiastical parish of Ballymacscanlon and Lordship; however, the northern part of Ravensdale is part of the parish area of Jonesborough and Dromintee.

Ravensdale, which is situated beside Bellurgan, contains a number of wooded areas. The Ravensdale Forest nature trail is located in the wooded demesne of the former seat of the Barons Clermont, which straddles the border between County Armagh in Northern Ireland and County Louth in the Republic of Ireland. Ravensdale Park, also known as Ravensdale Castle, the 19th-century country house itself, was one of a number of such country houses destroyed during the Irish revolutionary period. Burned in 1921, the stonework of the house was later dismantled and reused during the construction of the Church of St. Brigid in Glassdrummond in 1927.

The Flurry River, which flows through the area before entering Dundalk Bay at Bellurgan, was in past times a trout and salmon fishery.
