= Thomas Bellingham =

Anglo-Irish soldier and politician (1644 or 1645 – 1721)

Thomas Bellingham (1644 or 1645 – 15 September 1721) was an Anglo-Irish soldier and politician.

Bellingham was the son of Henry Bellingham and Lucy Sibthorpe. He was educated at the cathedral school of St Patrick's Cathedral, Dublin before entering Trinity College Dublin on 16 February 1660.

He was appointed High Sheriff of Louth in 1684. Following the Glorious Revolution in 1688, Bellingham fled Ireland to live with cousins in Preston, Lancashire. His house at Castlebellingham was burnt down by Jacobites in 1690. He returned to Ireland in May 1690 as a colonel in the army of William III of England. He was an aide to King William prior to the Battle of the Boyne, when his knowledge of the Louth countryside aided Williamite preparations for the battle. He was appointed High Sheriff of Louth for a second term in 1690.

Following the conclusion of the Williamite War in Ireland, Bellingham was elected as a Member of Parliament for County Louth in the Irish House of Commons, sitting between 1692 and 1713.

He rebuilt the family home of Bellingham Castle in the Dutch style in the 1690s. He kept a campaign diary for the period 28 August 1689 to 12 September 1690, which was edited and published by Anthony Hewitson as the Diary of Thomas Bellingham, an officer under William III (1908).

Parliament of Ireland
Preceded by Thomas Bellew; William Talbot	Member of Parliament for County Louth; 1692–1713; With: Sir William Tichborne (1692–1693); Henry Tichborne (1695–1699); Henry Tenison (1703–1710); Sir Henry Tichborne, Bt (1710–1713)	Succeeded by Richard Tisdall; Stephen Ludlow
