= Glyde =

Glyde may refer to:

- George Glyde (1821–1898), settler of Western Australia
- Henry George Glyde (1906–1998), Canadian painter
- Lavington Glyde (1825–1890), South Australian politician, perhaps not related to Samuel and William
- Rosemary Glyde (1948–1994), violist and composer
- Samuel Dening Glyde (1842–1898), South Australian wheat merchant and politician, brother of William
- Tania Glyde, British novelist
- William Dening Glyde (c. 1826–1901), South Australian wheat merchant and politician, brother of Samuel

as a given name

- Glyde Butler (1932–2000), politician of Victoria, Australia

== See also ==
- Glyde, Pennsylvania
- Glyde Farm Produce
- Glyde River in the Top End of Australia
- River Glyde, Ireland
- Samsung SCH-U940
