= Thomas Fortescue (1683–1769) =

Irish politician

Arms of Fortescue: Azure, a bend engrailed argent, plain cotised or

Thomas Fortescue (1683 – 23 January 1769) was an Irish Member of Parliament.

== Origins ==
He was a great-grandson of Sir Faithful Fortescue (c.1581–1666), a royalist commander during the English Civil War who established the family's fortunes in Ireland, and was a member of the Fortescue family of Buckland Filleigh in Devon, descended from Sir John Fortescue (c.1394-1479), Chief Justice of the King's Bench, of Ebrington Manor, Gloucestershire, a younger grandson of the Fortescue family of Whympston in the parish of Modbury in Devon, the earliest Fortescue seat in England.

== Career ==
He sat in the Irish House of Commons for Dundalk from 1727 to 1760.

== Marriage and children ==
He married Elizabeth Hamilton, a daughter of James Hamilton, a sister of James Hamilton, 1st Earl of Clanbrassil and a granddaughter of John Mordaunt, 1st Viscount Mordaunt, by whom he had children including:

- William Henry Fortescue, 1st Earl of Clermont;
- James Fortescue, an MP and Privy Councillor;
- Charlotte Fortescue, who married Sir Henry Goodricke, 6th Baronet;
- Margaret Fortescue, who married Sir Arthur Brooke, 1st Baronet.
