= Navnit Bham =

Navnit Bham (23 August 1928 – 9 March 2007) was an Indian film director and producer. He directed a number of Hindi and Gujarati films. He was one of the pioneers of Gujarati cinema and set up the first film studio in Gujarat.
