= County Louth (Parliament of Ireland constituency) =

Pre-1801 Irish constituency

- Former county constituency for the Irish House of Commons
- County: County Louth

–1801
- Seats: 2
- Replaced by: County Louth

County Louth was a constituency represented in the Irish House of Commons to 1801.

== Members of Parliament ==
- 1370:, citing Roger Gernon, Richard Vernon
- 1376: Roger Gernoun and Richard Verdoun were elected to come to England to consult with the king and council about the government of Ireland and about an aid for the king.
- 1420: citing Bartholomew Vernon, Richard Bagot
- 1560: Nicholas Taaffe of Ballebragane and Edward Dowdall of Glaspistal
- 1585: Roger Gerlone (Garland) and William Moore of Barmeath
- 1613–1315: Christopher Verdon de Clonmore and Richard Gernon de Stabanan
- 1634–1635: Sir Christopher Bellew and Christopher Dowdall
- 1639–1642: Christopher Bellew and John Bellew (both expelled)
- 1642–1644: Philip, Lord Lisle and Col. Lawrence Crawford (both absent in England without leave)
- 1644–1649: Hon Francis Moore and Gerrard Moore
- 1659: John Ruxton
- 1661–1666: Henry Bellingham and Sir Thomas Stanley

=== 1689–1801 ===
Election	First MP	Second MP
1689	Thomas Bellew	William Talbot
1692	Thomas Bellingham	Sir William Tichborne
1695	Thomas Bellingham	Sir Henry Tichborne
1703	Thomas Bellingham	Henry Tenison
1710	Thomas Bellingham	Sir Henry Tichborne, 1st Bt
1713	Richard Tisdall	Stephen Ludlow
1715	Richard Tisdall	Robert Moore
1727	Faithful Fortescue	William Aston
1741	Henry Bellingham	William Aston
1745	Henry Bellingham	William Henry Fortescue
1755	Thomas Tipping	William Henry Fortescue
1761	Anthony Foster	James Fortescue
1767	Stephen Sibthorpe	James Fortescue
1768	John Foster	James Fortescue
1782	John Foster	Thomas James Fortescue
1796	John Foster	William Fortescue
1801	Replaced by Westminster constituency of County Louth	
