= Sir Daniel Bellingham, 1st Baronet =

Anglo-Irish merchant and official (c.1620–1672)

Sir Daniel Bellingham, 1st Baronet, (c. 1620–1672) was an Anglo-Irish merchant and official in the Dublin Castle administration of Ireland.

== Biography ==
Bellingham was the elder son of Robert Bellingham, an attorney in the Court of Exchequer, and Margaret Whyte. He was the older brother of Henry Bellingham. He became a member of the Goldsmiths’ Company of Dublin in 1644. Bellingham was made a freeman of Dublin in 1648, served a term as Sheriff of Dublin City in 1655, and became an alderman in 1656. In 1659 Bellingham was appointed a major in the city militia, although he maintained secret contact with the exiled Royalist Duke of Ormond throughout the 1650s and was not punished after the Stuart Restoration.

A wealthy man by 1660, Bellingham was recommended to undertake the supply of clothing for the Irish Army in 1661. From 1661, he was one of a group that sought a patent to issue coinage in Ireland and that was granted the office of alnage of cloth in 1662. He was knighted on 30 September 1662 at Dublin Castle. He served a term as Lord Mayor of Dublin from 1665 to 1666 and was the first holder of the office to use the prefix "lord". From 1661 to 1667 he was Deputy Receiver-General and Vice-Treasurer of Ireland. His time in office was not successful; a London treasury investigation in 1668 revealed his inept handling of Ireland's finances.

On 18 March 1667, he was created a baronet, of Dubber in the Baronetage of Ireland. In around 1645 he married Jane, daughter of Richard Barlow of Cheshire; they had one son and six daughters. Upon Bellingham's death in 1672, he was buried in St. Werburgh's Church, Dublin. He was succeeded in his title by his eldest son, Richard.

Civic offices
Preceded by William Smyth as Mayor of Dublin	Lord Mayor of Dublin; 1665–1666	Succeeded by John Desmynieres
Baronetage of Ireland
New creation	Baronet (of Dubber); 1667–1672	Succeeded by Richard Bellingham
