= Cooley Mountains =

Mountains in County Louth, Ireland

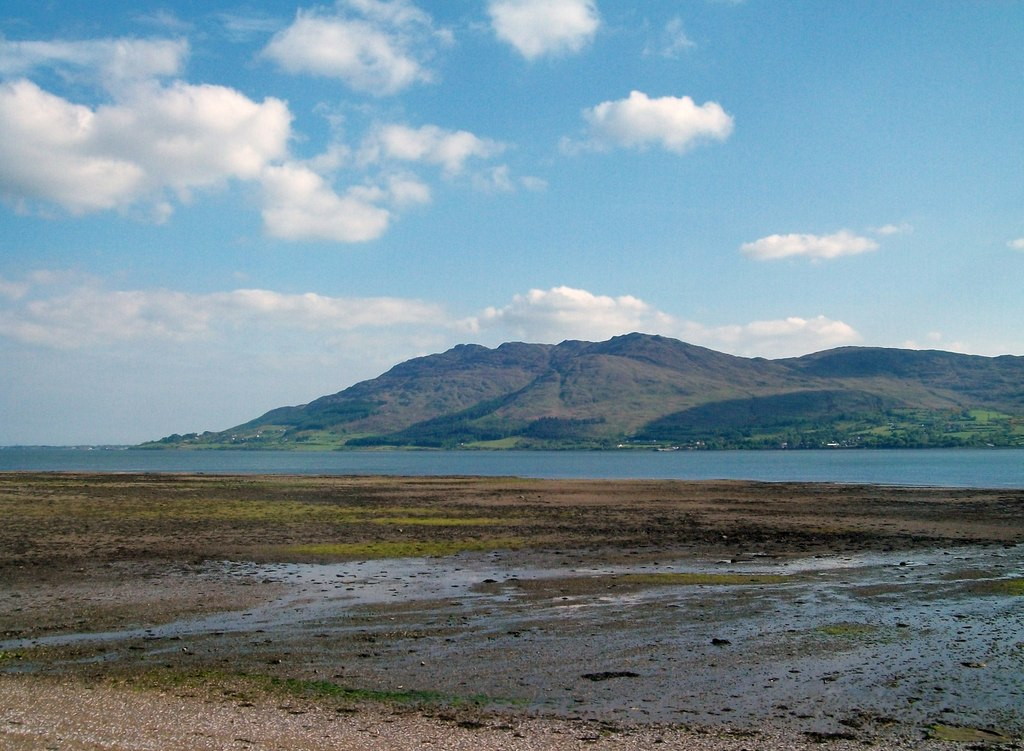
- The eastern ridge of the Cooley Mountains seen from Warrenpoint

Highest point
- Peak: Slieve Foy
- Elevation: 589 m (1,932 ft)
- Coordinates: 54°03′11.7″N 6°16′30″W

Geography
- Country: Ireland
- Provinces of Ireland: Leinster

The Cooley Mountains (Irish: Sléibhte Cuaille) are on the Cooley Peninsula in northeast County Louth in Ireland. They consist of two ridges running northwest to southeast, separated by the valley of Glenmore with the Big River running through it.

Slieve Foy, at 589 metres (1,932 ft), is the highest peak of the range and the highest in County Louth. It is on the eastern ridge, which is about 6 km (3.7 mi) long and also includes the peaks of The Eagles Rock (528m), The Ravens Rock (457m), The Foxes Rock (404m), and Barnavave (350m). This latter name comes from Bearna Mhéabha (Maeve's Gap), and refers to the legendary Queen Medb (Maeve), whose army is said to have dug a pass through the mountain.

The western ridge is made up of Clermont Carn (510 m), Carnavaddy (475m) and Slievenaglogh (310m).

The mountains are the mythical home of hurling as told in the Táin Bó Cúailnge (Cattle Raid of Cooley), when Sétanta traveled through the mountains hitting his sliothar (ball) before him on his way to Emain Macha. This feat is re-enacted every year in the All-Ireland Poc Fada Championship which takes place on Annaverna Mountain.
