= Oliver Anketell =

Oliver Anketell was an 18th-century Irish politician.

Anketell was born in Dungannon in 1679 and educated at Trinity College, Dublin. From 1753 to 1760, he was MP for Monaghan Borough.
