= James Fortescue (politician) =

Irish politician

James Fortescue (15 May 1725 – May 1782) was an Irish politician.

He sat in the Irish House of Commons for Dundalk between 1757 and 1760 and County Louth between 1761 and his death. He was also elected for Monaghan in 1776, but chose to continue sitting for Louth.

He was appointed to the Irish Privy Council on 7 May 1770.

He was the son of Thomas Fortescue, brother of William Henry Fortescue, 1st Earl of Clermont, and father of Thomas James Fortescue and William Charles Fortescue, 2nd Viscount Clermont.
