= Cooley Peninsula =

Peninsula in County Louth, Ireland

Coordinates: 54°2′4″N 6°13′36″W

Cuaille
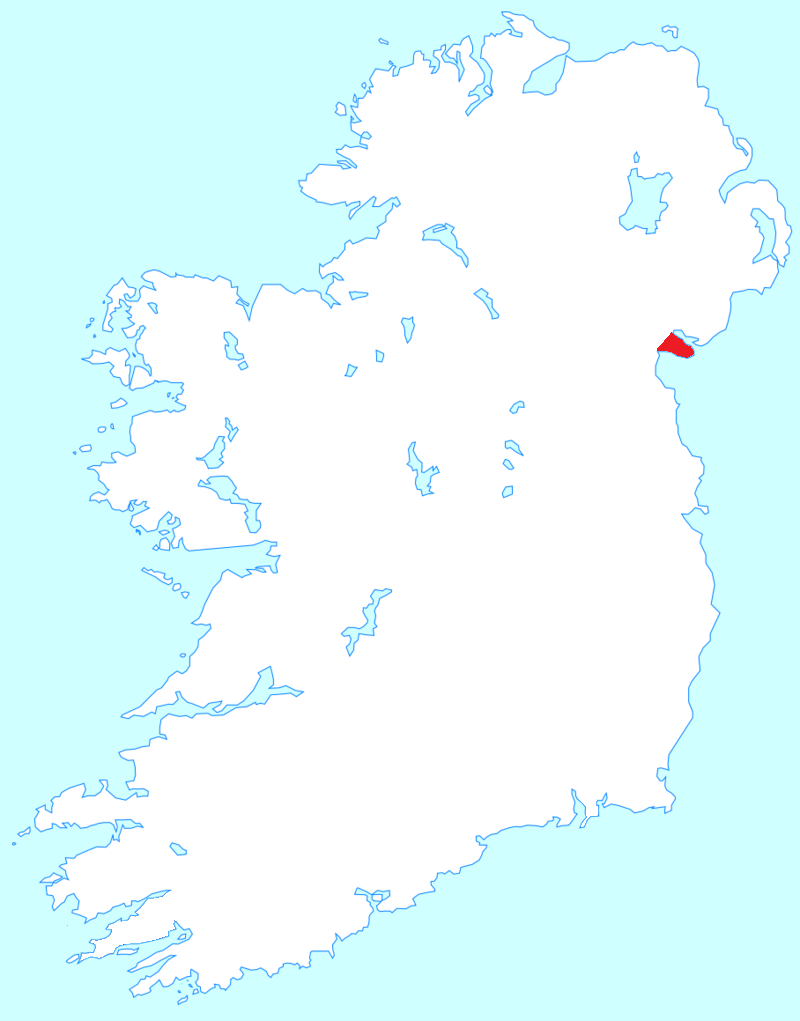
- Location of the Cooley Peninsula
- Interactive map of Cooley Peninsula

Geography
- Location: Ireland
- Adjacent to: Irish Sea
- Area: 155 km^{2} (60 sq mi)
- Highest elevation: 589 m (1932 ft)
- Highest point: Slieve Foy

Administration
- Ireland
- County: County Louth
- Barony: Dundalk Lower

Demographics
- Population: 9,212 (2016)
- Pop. density: 59.4/km^{2} (153.8/sq mi)

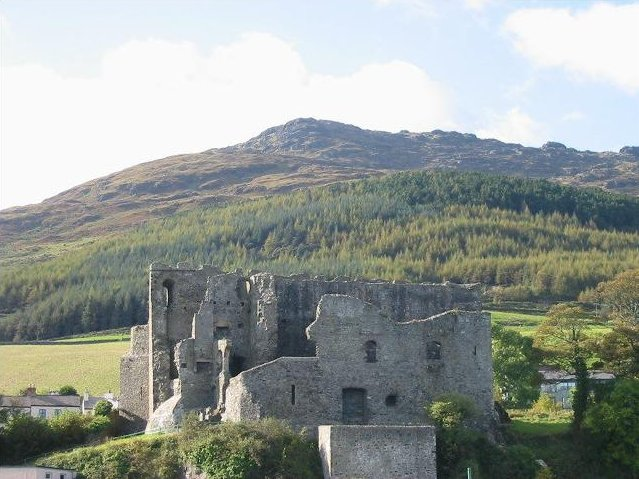
The Cooley Peninsula's highest point, Slieve Foy, as seen from Carlingford

The Cooley Peninsula (from Irish Cuaille, older Cúalṅge) is a hilly peninsula in the north of County Louth on the east coast of Ireland; the peninsula includes the small town of Carlingford, the port of Greenore and the village of Omeath. The peninsula is roughly coextensive with the Barony of Dundalk Lower.

== Geography ==
The peninsula contains the Cooley Mountains, the highest of which, Slieve Foy, is also the highest peak in County Louth at 589 metres (1,932 ft). To the north is Carlingford Lough and the Province of Ulster; to the south is Dundalk Bay. The peninsula is ringed by the R173 regional road.

The peninsula is geologically diverse, with 440-million-year-old Silurian greywacke sandstones in the northwest and southwest, 340-million-year-old limestones in the east, and 60-million-year-old volcanic rocks forming the Cooley Mountains.

== Antiquity ==
In Irish mythology, Cooley (Old Irish Cúalnge) was the home of the bull Donn Cuailnge, and the site of the Táin Bó Cúailnge, "Cattle Raid of Cooley". Ancient monuments in Cooley include the Proleek Dolmen, whose capstone weighs an estimated 35 tons (31.75 tonnes), and a Bronze Age gallery grave, both near Ballymascanlan.

== Business ==
The peninsula is primarily agricultural territory, but is also home to a number of hotels and bed-and-breakfasts, the first new distillery in Ireland in decades, the Cooley Distillery opened by John Teeling on the site of a former potato alcohol factory, several warehouse and logistics facilities, a garden centre, two cafes and other businesses.

There is a ferry service to County Down in Northern Ireland at Greenore.

== Sport ==
The local Gaelic football and ladies' Gaelic football club is Cooley Kickhams, based south of Carlingford.

== People ==
The Cooley Peninsula is the home of former Leinster and Irish rugby players, Rob Kearney and David Kearney. The former U.S. President Joe Biden has ancestors from the area. He shares a great-grandfather with the Kearney brothers. RTÉ sports commentator Jimmy Magee (1935–2017) was raised on the Cooley Peninsula.
