= Henry Bellingham (Irish politician) =

Anglo-Irish soldier and politician (died 1676)

Member of Parliament
- In office 1661-1666
- Constituency: County Louth

High Sheriff of Kildare
- In office 1654–1656
- Preceded by: George Medlicott of Tully
- Succeeded by: John Hewetson of Kildare

High Sheriff of Louth
- In office 1671–1672
- Preceded by: William Disney
- Succeeded by: Henry Townley

Personal details
- Died: 1676
- Relations: Sir Daniel Bellingham, 1st Baronet (brother)
- Children: Thomas Bellingham (son)

Military service
- Allegiance: Kingdom of England (until 1648); Commonwealth of England (from 1648)
- Branch/service: New Model Army
- Years of service: 1640s-1653
- Rank: Cornet
- Battles/wars: Cromwellian conquest of Ireland

Henry Bellingham (died 1676) was an Anglo-Irish soldier, landowner, and politician.

Bellingham was the younger son of Robert Bellingham, attorney in the Court of Exchequer, and Margaret Whyte. He was the younger brother of Sir Daniel Bellingham, 1st Baronet.

He served as an army officer in Ireland in the 1640s, and signed a predominantly military petition addressed to Charles I of England by Protestants in Ireland in late 1643. By 1648, his allegiance was with the Commonwealth and he is recorded as a lieutenant in the army of Michael Jones. He participated in the Cromwellian conquest of Ireland as a cornet in John Hewson's cavalry regiment. In 1653, he left military service and was granted land in County Louth under the Act for the Settlement of Ireland 1652, in lieu of pay, at what would later become Castlebellingham.

In 1654, Bellingham was High Sheriff of Kildare. During the 1650s, he became a figure of significant influence in Louth. He served as a revenue commissioner in 1654 and 1657, a member of a commission investigating the organisation of parishes in 1658, a commissioner for the civil survey in the county, and a captain of a militia company from 1659 to 1662. He represented Louth in the Irish Convention of 1660 and was elected as a Member of Parliament for County Louth in 1661. Bellingham was a poll tax commissioner in 1660 and 1661, a commissioner for setting of lands in 1662, and an assessor of hearth money in 1664. His ownership of lands in Louth was confirmed in the Act of Settlement 1662. In 1671, he was High Sheriff of Louth.

Bellingham married Lucy Sibthorpe; they had one son, the politician Thomas Bellingham.

Parliament of Ireland
Preceded by Third Protectorate Parliament; John Ruxton	Member of Parliament for County Louth; 1661–1666; With: Sir Thomas Stanley	Succeeded by Thomas Bellew; William Talbot
