= Bellingham baronets of Castle Bellingham (1796) =

Escutcheon of the Bellingham baronets

The Bellingham baronetcy, of Castle Bellingham in the County of Louth, was created in the Baronetage of Great Britain on 19 April 1796 for William Bellingham. He was Member of Parliament for Reigate from 1784 to 1789, and private secretary to William Pitt the Younger. The title was created with special remainder to the heirs male of his father Colonel Alan Bellingham; he was a direct descendant of Henry Bellingham, younger brother of the 1st Baronet of the 1667 creation.

Bellingham died childless and was succeeded according to the remainder by his nephew, the 2nd Baronet, son of Alan Bellingham. He was succeeded by his son, the 3rd Baronet, High Sheriff of County Louth in 1829. On his death the title passed to his son, the 4th Baronet, Member of Parliament for County Louth from 1880 to 1885, and Lord-Lieutenant of County Louth in 1897.

He was succeeded by his son the 5th Baronet, Brigadier-General in the British Army, a Senator of the Irish Free State and Lord-Lieutenant of County Louth. He died without male issue and was succeeded by his nephew the 6th Baronet (the son of Captain Roger Charles Noel Bellingham, second son of the 4th Baronet). His sons became the 7th and 8th Baronets.

The family seat was Castle Bellingham, near the village of Castlebellingham (formerly Gernonstown), County Louth. It passed out of the family c. 1956, who had possessed it since the beginning of the 18th century, soon after the death of the 5th Baronet.

== Bellingham baronets, of Castle Bellingham (1796) ==
- Sir William Bellingham, 1st Baronet (c. 1756–1826)
- Sir Alan Bellingham, 2nd Baronet (1776–1827)
- Sir Alan Edward Bellingham, 3rd Baronet (1800–1889)
- Sir (Alan) Henry Bellingham, 4th Baronet (1846–1921)
- Sir Edward Henry Charles Patrick Bellingham, 5th Baronet (1879–1956)
- Sir Roger Carroll Patrick Stephen Bellingham, 6th Baronet (1911–1973)
- Sir Noel Peter Roger Bellingham, 7th Baronet (1943–1999)
- Sir Anthony Edward Norman Bellingham, 8th Baronet (1947–2015)
- Sir William Alexander Noel Bellingham, 9th Baronet (born 1991).

== Extended family ==
- Alice Sophia, daughter of the 3rd Baronet, was the wife of Sir Victor Brooke, 3rd Baronet, and the mother of Alan Brooke, 1st Viscount Alanbrooke.

== Notes ==
Baronetage of Great Britain
Preceded by Pellew baronets	Bellingham baronets of Castle Bellingham; 19 April 1796	Succeeded by Hippisley baronets
