= Ronald McClintock =

Irish-born British flying ace

Ronald Saint Clair McClintock
- Born: 13 July 1892; County Carlow, Ireland
- Died: 22 June 1922 (aged 29); RAF Northolt, London, England
- Relatives: John McClintock (great-grandfather)
- Military career
- Allegiance: United Kingdom
- Branch: British Army; Royal Air Force
- Service years: 1914–1922
- Rank: Major
- Units: Ceylon Planters' Rifle Corps; Royal Field Artillery; No. 2 Squadron RFC; No. 64 Squadron RFC
- Commands: No. 3 Squadron RAF
- Awards: Military Cross

Major Ronald Saint Clair McClintock MC (13 July 1892 – 22 June 1922) was a British World War I flying ace credited with five aerial victories.

== Family background ==
McClintock was born in County Carlow, Ireland, the fifth and youngest son of Arthur George Florence McClintock JP DL, of Rathvinden, Leighlandbridge and first wife Susan Heywood-Collins. His grandfather was Lieutenant-Colonel George Augustus Jocelyn McClintock, of the 52nd Regiment of Foot and the Sligo Rifles, and his great-grandfather, John McClintock, of Drumcar House, was Serjeant-at-Arms to the Irish House of Commons and High Sheriff of Louth. He married Lady Elizabeth Le Poer Trench, third daughter of William Trench, 1st Earl of Clancarty.

== World War I service ==
McClintock first served in Egypt from November 1914, as a private in the Ceylon Planters' Rifle Corps, however he was soon commissioned as a second lieutenant in the West Lancashire Brigade, Royal Field Artillery (Territorial Force), and was promoted to temporary lieutenant on 5 July 1915.

He was seconded for duty with the Royal Flying Corps on 4 April 1916, and was appointed a flying officer (observer). He first served as an observer/gunner in No. 2 Squadron RFC, before training as a pilot, and being appointed a flying officer on 4 August. On 1 January 1917 he was appointed a flight commander with the temporary rank of captain. On 28 June his promotion to lieutenant in the Royal Field Artillery was made substantive, while remaining seconded to the RFC.

In July he was posted to No. 64 Squadron RFC, flying the Airco DH.5 fighter. The squadron moved to France in October, and took part in the battle of Cambrai, flying low-level ground attack missions. The squadron replaced their DH.5s with the SE.5a in March 1918.

McClintock gained his first aerial victory on 10 March 1918, driving down an LVG C reconnaissance aircraft over Marquion. On the afternoon of 23 March he destroyed a Pfalz D.III over Pronville, and an Albatros D.V over Biache. The following day he destroyed another Type C over Le Transloy, and finally on 2 April another D.V over Fricourt. On 20 April he was appointed a temporary major, to serve as commander of No. 3 Squadron RAF.

McClintock was awarded the Military Cross which was gazetted on 21 June 1918. His citation read:

Lieutenant (Temporary Captain) Ronald Sinclair McClintock, RFA and RFC.

"For conspicuous gallantry and devotion to duty. On one occasion he shot down two enemy machines, and on the following day he attacked and shot down a hostile two-seater machine at a height of 100 feet. He has led upwards of forty patrols and has performed much valuable work on low-flying reconnaissance and bombing patrols. As a flight commander he has been untiring in his care of personnel and machines, and as a patrol leader he has displayed the greatest courage and resource."

== Post-war career ==
McClintock was granted a permanent commission in the RAF, with the rank of captain, on 1 August 1919. From 1920 he served at the No. 3 School of Technical Training (Men) at RAF Manston, while living in Birchington-on-Sea.

On 22 June 1922 Flight Lieutenant McClintock was flying a Sopwith Snipe at RAF Northolt, practising for a relay race to be held at the RAF's Annual Aerial Pageant at Hendon Aerodrome, when his aircraft hit an air pocket and he was catapulted from his plane and was killed.

== Personal life ==
McClintock married Mary Gordon Laird, daughter of John Laird, Chairman of shipbuilders Cammel Laird, at the Church of the Holy Trinity, Kensington Gore, London, on 20 December 1916. They had two children. John Arthur Peter McClintock (1920–1940), who served as a flight lieutenant in Auxiliary Air Force Squadron 615 In World War II. He fought in the Battle of Britain and became a member of the Caterpillar Club, surviving bailing out over the North Sea. He was killed in action in October 1940 aged 20. He left a sister, Pamela Mary McClintock, (b 19 Feb 1922). She was less than four months old at the time of her father's death.
