= Joseph Nolan (politician) =

British politician

Joseph Nolan (1846 – 14 September 1928) was an Irish nationalist politician and Member of Parliament (MP) in the House of Commons of the United Kingdom of Great Britain and Ireland. As a member of the Irish Parliamentary Party, he represented North Louth from 1885 to 1892, and South Louth from 1900 to 1918. The Irish Times (15 September 1928) said he was "One of the Fenians whom Parnellism conquered."

Nolan was born at Castleblayney, County Monaghan. He married Mary Flinn, who had been born in County Down, in 1884. She was 12–14 years his junior. Together they had nine children, of whom two died young, leaving by 1911 three sons and four daughters. Nolan was originally a schoolteacher, in Ireland and then at a reformatory school in Liverpool. He later became manager of the Aquarium and Casino in New Brighton on the Wirral Peninsula near Liverpool, and this was his job at the time of his first election to Parliament for the new seat of North Louth in the Nationalist landslide of 1885. In this election, as the official Irish National League candidate supported by Charles Stewart Parnell, he defeated Philip Callan, who had previously sat for Co. Louth as a Home Ruler but had fallen out with Parnell and now stood as an Independent Nationalist. Nolan was then returned unopposed in 1886.

When the Irish Parliamentary Party split over the leadership of Charles Stewart Parnell in 1890, Nolan supported Parnell. At the following election in 1892 he stood in South Louth but was defeated by an Anti-Parnellite by more than 2 to 1. At the general election of July 1895 he stood in the North Louth seat again, challenging the prominent Anti-Parnellite incumbent Tim Healy, but was again defeated, this time by 3 to 2. In a by-election the following September, he came within 88 votes of winning Limerick City as a Parnellite.

At the general election of October 1900, following the reunification of the Irish Parliamentary Party, he stood in the South Louth seat as an Independent Nationalist against the official Nationalist candidate, and won with 57% of the vote. He was subsequently reconciled to the official Party and returned unopposed at South Louth until 1918, when he retired.

In a characteristically colourful obituary in the Daily Telegraph, T. P. O'Connor said, like the Irish Times, that 'Nolan was one of the Fenians whom Parnellism conquered'. He went on to write: '....and when Parnell was on the look-out for candidates to join his new and soon-to-be-powerful party his mind was directed to Nolan, who had a record of obscure but violent acts behind him....He was a very fine-looking fellow, 6 ft 2in or 3in high, very well proportioned, with a handsome and refined face....He could speak, but with such slowness as to make a speech from him almost an infliction....he was always in or about the House of Commons....Forced to make a living - for there was no salary for Members of Parliament in those days, and a very small allowance from the party funds - Nolan was always engaged in some enterprise which he was trying to push....At one time it was to purchase rum of Jamaica; at another he had some scheme for exploring and exploiting a large piece of land in Labrador. Like all his colleagues, I heard Labrador described with his maddening slowness of speech, until in the end I had to protect myself by rarely seeing him.' O'Connor added that at the end of his life Nolan 'got into a state of almost complete destitution'.

In 1901 he was working as a 'dealer's agent, own account' and in 1911 as a wine shipper. It can be inferred from the Census records that he never lived in Ireland after about 1884.

His last recorded public appearance seems to have been at a service of thanksgiving for the signing of the Anglo-Irish Treaty held in Westminster Cathedral, London, on 8 December 1921, which was also attended by his former Irish Parliamentary Party colleagues T. P. O'Connor and Thomas Scanlan.

== Sources ==
- Census of England and Wales, 1901 and 1911
- Irish Times, 15 September 1928
- Rt Hon. T. P. O'Connor M.P., Obituary, Mr Joseph Nolan, Daily Telegraph, 15 September 1928
- Michael Stenton & Stephen Lees, Who's Who of British Members of Parliament, Vol.2 1886–1918, Sussex, Harvester Press, 1978
- The Times (London), 4 December 1885, 5 July 1892, 9 December 1921
- Brian M. Walker (ed.), Parliamentary Election Results in Ireland, 1801-1922, Dublin, Royal Irish Academy, 1978

Parliament of the United Kingdom
New constituency	Member of Parliament for North Louth; 1885 – 1892	Succeeded by Tim Healy
Preceded by Richard McGhee	Member of Parliament for South Louth; 1900 – 1918	Constituency abolished (see County Louth)
