= Baron Rathdonnell =

Title in the Peerage of Ireland

Baron Rathdonnell, of Rathdonnell in the County of Donegal, is a title in the Peerage of Ireland. It was created on 21 December 1868 for John McClintock, with remainder to the male issue of his deceased younger brother Captain William McClintock-Bunbury (who had represented County Carlow in the House of Commons). The barony is named after the townland of Rathdonnell, near the village of Trentagh, just north-west of Letterkenny.

The barony of Rathdonnell was the second-last barony created in the Peerage of Ireland. Lord Rathdonnell was succeeded according to the special remainder by his nephew, the second Baron, who sat in the House of Lords as an Irish representative peer from 1889 to 1929 and also served as Lord Lieutenant of County Carlow between 1890 and 1922. As of 2025 the title is held by the sixth Baron, the second Baron's great-great-grandson, who succeeded his father in that year.

The Arctic explorer, Admiral Sir Leopold McClintock, was the nephew of the first Baron.

The family seat is Lisnavagh House, near Rathvilly, County Carlow.

== Barons Rathdonnell (1868) ==
- John McClintock, 1st Baron Rathdonnell (1798–1879)
- Thomas Kane McClintock-Bunbury, 2nd Baron Rathdonnell (1848–1929)
- Thomas Leopold McClintock-Bunbury, 3rd Baron Rathdonnell (1881–1937)
- William Robert McClintock-Bunbury, 4th Baron Rathdonnell (1914–1959)
- Thomas Benjamin McClintock-Bunbury, 5th Baron Rathdonnell (Ben Rathdonnell; 1938–2025)
- William Leopold McClintock-Bunbury, 6th Baron Rathdonnell (born 1966)

The heir apparent is the present holder's son, the Hon. Thomas Anthony McClintock-Bunbury (born 2011).

=== Line of succession ===
Line of succession
- John McClintock (1770–1855)
  - John McClintock, 1st Baron Rathdonnell (1798–1879)
  - Capt. William Bunbury McClintock-Bunbury (1800–1866)
    - Thomas Kane McClintock-Bunbury, 2nd Baron Rathdonnell (1848–1929)
      - Thomas Leopold McClintock-Bunbury, 3rd Baron Rathdonnell (1881–1937)
        - William Robert McClintock-Bunbury, 4th Baron Rathdonnell (1914–1959)
          - Thomas Benjamin McClintock-Bunbury, 5th Baron Rathdonnell (1938–2025)
            - William Leopold McClintock-Bunbury, 6th Baron Rathdonnell (born 1966)
              - (1) Hon. Thomas Anthony McClintock-Bunbury (born 2011)
            - (2) Hon. George Andrew Kane McClintock-Bunbury (born 1968)
              - (3) Shamus Alick McClintock-Bunbury (born 2001)
            - (4) Hon. James Alexander Hugh McClintock-Bunbury (born 1972)

== Arms ==
Coat of arms of Baron Rathdonnell
Crest A lion passant Proper. Escutcheon Per pale Gules and Azure a chevron Ermine between three escallop shells Argent. Supporters Dexter a lion and sinister a leopard both Proper each gorged with a collar Ermine and each charged on the shoulder with an escallop Argent. Motto Virtute Et Labore
