= Drumcar =

Village in County Louth, Ireland

Drumcar Droim Chora
- Village
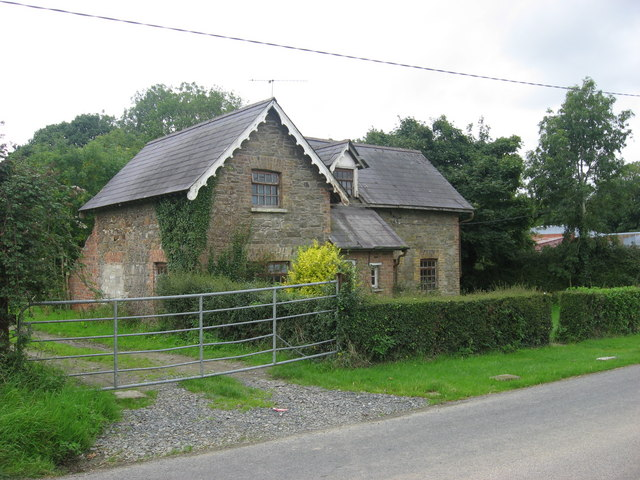
- Estate house in Drumcar

- Location in Ireland
- Coordinates: 53°51′37″N 6°22′40″W
- Country: Ireland
- Province: Leinster
- County: County Louth
- Barony: Ardee
- Time zone: UTC+0 (WET)
  - Summer (DST): UTC-1 (IST (WEST))

Drumcar (Irish: Droim Chora, meaning 'ridge of the weir') is a village and a historical parish, in the barony of Ardee in County Louth, Ireland.

== Geography ==
Drumcar is 1.5 miles (2.4 km) northeast of Dunleer, on the River Glyde, and near the high road from Dublin to Belfast. It comprises, according to the Ordnance Survey, 4041 ½ statute acres, of which, 3712 are applotted under the tithe act, and 18 ½ are in the River Glyde. Nearby are Kilsaran, Dillonstown Cross, Keenanʼs Cross, Annagassan, Baile an Ghearlánaigh, Castlebellingham, Clonmore, Stabannan, Dromin, Grangebellew, Civil Hollow, Lurgan, Martinʼs Cross, Salterstown, Mooretown, Milltown, Dromiskin, and Togher. The River Drumcar is formed from two streams that merge at a bridge.

== History ==
Early records that mention Drumcar are noted in the Annals of Ulster, 431 to 1540, that Cellach, son of Muirghis, who was Abbot of Druin-cara, was slain by Gertide, son of Tuathal.

The Patron Saint of Drumcar was Saint Fintan (d. 603) who founded a monastery in the village. Tradition places it 840 feet (260 m) west of the old church. It was named Raire na bratar. There was reportedly an abbey located in Drumcar as far back as 811. The Patron Day is celebrated in Drumcar on 29 July.

The parish church history is that of the Diocese of Armagh. The vicarage formed part of the union of Dunleer. The Protestant parishioners attended the church at Dunleer, but religious service was also performed every Sunday evening by the curate in the school room at Drumcar. The rectory was under the jurisdiction of the Lord-Primate. Advowsons were granted to Peter Pipard in 1187. Between ca.1200 and 1220, Ralph de Repenteny granted the tithes, mills, fisheries and lands of the Church of St. Fintan, Drumcar, to the Abbot and Convent of St. Mary's Church, Dublin. From 1582, the rectory, parsonage, church and chapel were granted to Lord Ormond. They passed to Sir John Bath in 1630-1. William DiUon was impropriator in 1633. The tithes were rented by Henry Usher in 1656. There was an endowment for a clergyman to be appointed by the lord of the town. A payment of £50 per annum to the perpetual curate of Moylary was a provision of a testator's will as of 1837. The tithes amounted to £343, of which £292 was payable to the lord-primate and £51 to the vicar. The glebe comprised 11 acres. A churchyard was used as a burial-ground; it contains the featureless ruins of the previous church.

In the Roman Catholic church, the parish forms part of the union or district of Dysart. Historically, it did not have a regular chapel, but a house was given to the priest, in which he officiated.

Drumcar contained 1634 inhabitants as of 1837.

== Notable buildings ==
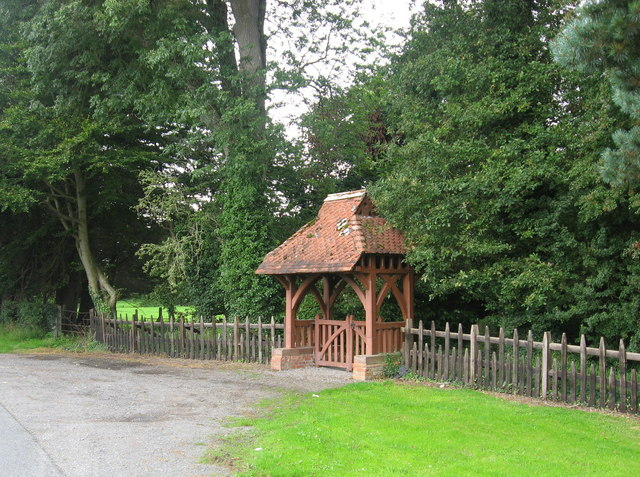
The lychgate to St. Fintan's Church of Ireland church in Drumcar

In County Louth, dedications to Irish saints were common, such as Ultan at Killany, Edan at Clonken, and Fintan at Drumcar. St. Fintans's, the Drumcar parish church, under the Church of Ireland was built in 1845 by John McClintock, 1st Baron Rathdonnell. It cost £1,550, of which the Ecclesiastical Commissioners contributed £160. It was consecrated on 15 May 1845 by the Bishop of Meath. The architectural style follows the High Anglicanism design of John Henry Newman's Littlemore church. Its features include a small four-bay lancet hall, buttresses, a bellcote over the west gable, a south porch, and limestone [dressings. In 1868, the choir section was extended and the chancel, with a triple-light east window, was added by Slater & Carpenter. The lychgate is from 1895 while a 1924 stained glass east window is of the Ascension by F. Clarke & Sons. The octagonal McClintock mausoleum is located opposite the church's north door. Built in 1868 by Slater & Carpenter, it is of Protestant High Victorian architecture style.

Drumcar House, the seat of John McClintock, Esq., MP, was an elegant mansion. Built in 1777, it is situated in an extensive and richly wooded demesne, commanding a view of the Carlingford and Mourne mountains and the sea. In 1948, it was sold and became St. Mary's Hospital, a colony for the mentally ill. It was later converted to Saint John of God Residence, a rectory, hospital/infirmary. The Old Rectory stands on 2.5 hectares, and was up for auction in 2000.

== Education ==
In his Topographical Dictionary of Ireland, published in 1837, Samuel Lewis records that a local school was supported by Mr. and Lady McClintock who paid a master for teaching more than 100 children and other expenses, amounting to £50 per annum as of 1837. Another school was supported by a Mr. Thompson in which 40 children were instructed.

As of the present day, students are served by St Mary's Special School, and St. Finian's National School.
