= Thomas McClintock (disambiguation) =

Thomas McClintock can refer to:

- Tom McClintock (born 1956), American Republican politician
- Thomas M'Clintock (1792–1876), American abolitionist
- Thomas McClintock-Bunbury, 2nd Baron Rathdonnell (1848–1929), Anglo-Irish peer, politician and army officer
