= Sir Henry Bellingham, 4th Baronet =

Anglo-Irish Conservative Member of Parliament

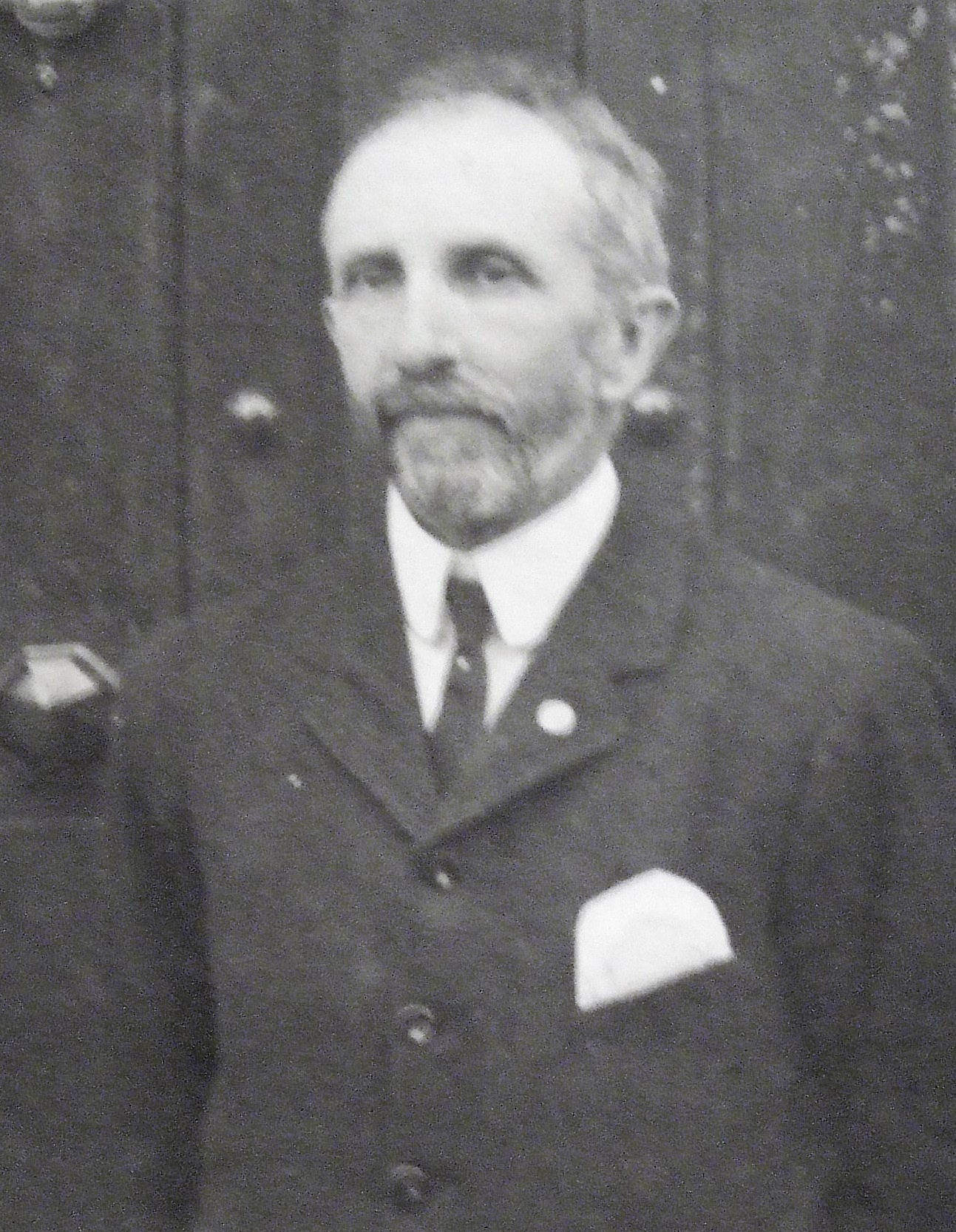
Sir Alan Henry Bellingham, 4th Baronet

Sir Alan Henry Bellingham, 4th Baronet, (23 August 1846 – 9 June 1921) was an Anglo-Irish Conservative Member of Parliament. He was Justice of the Peace, High Sheriff of Louth and Lord Lieutenant of Louth. He was Senator of the Royal University of Ireland and Private Chamberlain to popes Pius IX, Leo XIII and Pius X. He was the father of the diplomat Sir Edward Bellingham, 5th Bt. and the uncle of Sir Evelyn Wrench, editor of The Spectator.

== Early life ==
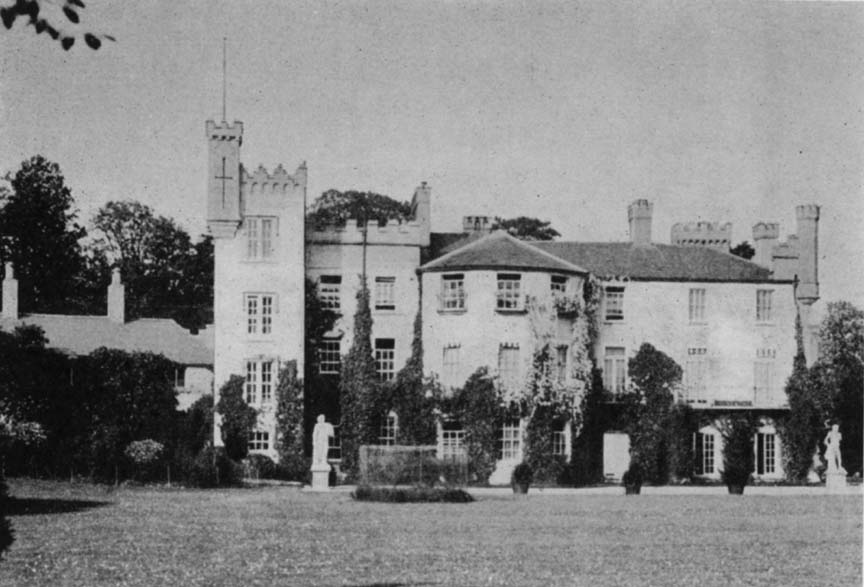
Castle Bellingham, County Louth; seat of the Bellinghams since 1660.

Born at Dunany House, Castlebellingham, County Louth, he was the eldest son of Sir Alan Bellingham, 3rd Baronet (1800–1889), and his wife Elizabeth Clarke, only daughter of Henry Clarke, of West Skirbeck House, Lincolnshire. He was the uncle of Sir Evelyn Wrench, editor of The Spectator.

He was educated at Windlesham House School, Harrow School and Exeter College, Oxford, where he graduated with a Bachelor of Arts in 1869 and a Master of Arts three years later. In 1909, he received an Honorary Doctorate of Law from the Royal University of Ireland and became one of its senators.

== Career ==
He succeeded his father as baronet in 1889. In 1900, he inherited the Castlebellingham estate from his uncle, Sydney Robert Bellingham.

In 1875, he was called to the bar by Lincoln's Inn. Bellingham served in the British Army and captain in the 6th Battalion, Royal Irish Rifles. He entered the British House of Commons in 1880, representing County Louth as Member of Parliament (MP) until 1885. He was High Sheriff of Louth in 1897, Justice of the Peace for this county and, having been previously a Deputy Lieutenant was appointed Lord Lieutenant of Louth in 1911, an office he held until his death in 1921. Bellingham was Commissioner of National Education for Ireland and was successively Private Chamberlain to the three popes, Pius IX, Leo XIII and Pius X.

== Personal life ==
On 13 January 1874, he married firstly Lady Constance Julia Eleanor Georgiana Noel, daughter of Charles Noel, 2nd Earl of Gainsborough at St Thomas of Canterbury Chapel at Exton Hall. Before her death in 1891, they were the parents of two sons and two daughters, including:

- Ida Mary Elizabeth Agnes Bellingham (1876–1945), a nun of the Society of the Holy Child Jesus who died unmarried.
- Sir Edward Henry Charles Patrick Bellingham, 5th Baronet (1879–1956), a Brig.-Gen. who married Charlotte Elizabeth Payne, daughter of Alfred Payne, in 1904.
- Augusta Mary Monica Bellingham (1880–1947), who married John Crichton-Stuart, 4th Marquess of Bute.
- Roger Charles Noel Bellingham (1884–1915), a Captain in the Royal Field Artillery who was killed in action during World War I; he married Alice Ann Naish, a daughter of Richard Naish, in 1910.

On 11 June 1895, Bellingham married secondly Hon. Lelgarde Harry Florence Clifton, younger daughter of Augustus Wykeham Clifton and his wife Bertha Clifton, 22nd Baroness Grey de Ruthyn at the Church of Our Lady, St John's Wood.

He died aged 74 and was succeeded in the baronetcy by his older son Edward.

Parliament of the United Kingdom
Preceded by Alexander Martin Sullivan; Philip Callan	Member of Parliament for County Louth; 1880 – 1885; With: Philip Callan	Constituency abolished
Honorary titles
Preceded by The Lord Bellew	Lord Lieutenant of Louth; 1911–1921	Succeeded by Sir Edward Bellingham, 5th Bt
Baronetage of Ireland
Preceded by Alan Bellingham	Baronet (of Castle Bellingham); 1889–1921	Succeeded by Edward Bellingham
