= Edward Bellingham (disambiguation) =

Edward Bellingham (1506–1549) was Lord Deputy of Ireland.

Edward Bellingham may also refer to:

- Edward Bellingham (died 1605), Member of Parliament for Lewes
- Sir Edward Bellingham, 5th Baronet (1879–1956), British soldier, politician and diplomat
