= Castlebellingham =

Village in County Louth, Ireland

Castlebellingham Baile an Ghearlánaigh
- Village
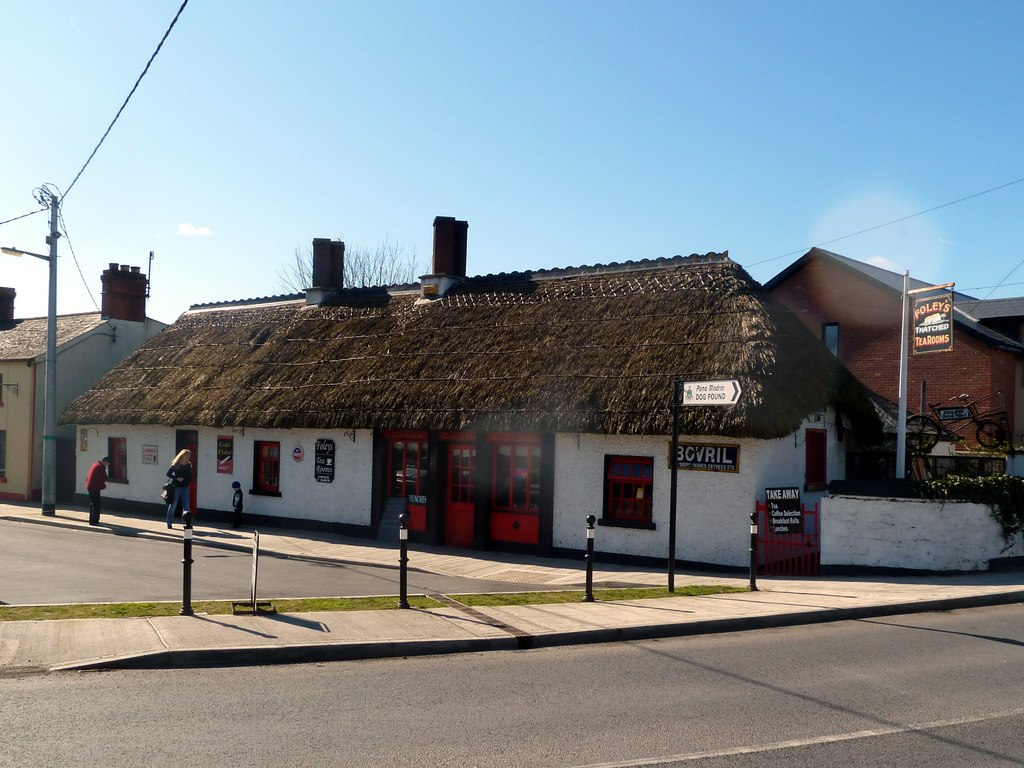
- Foleys Tea Rooms, Castlebellingham, in 2012

- Location in Ireland
- Coordinates: 53°54′N 6°23′W
- Country: Ireland
- Province: Leinster
- County: County Louth

Population (2016)
  - Total: 1,126
- (includes Kilsaran townland)

Castlebellingham (Irish: Baile an Ghearlánaigh) is a village and townland in County Louth, Ireland. The population of Castlebellingham-Kilsaran (named for the two townlands which make up the census area) increased from 721 inhabitants as of the 2002 census to 1,126 people as of the 2016 census.

== History ==
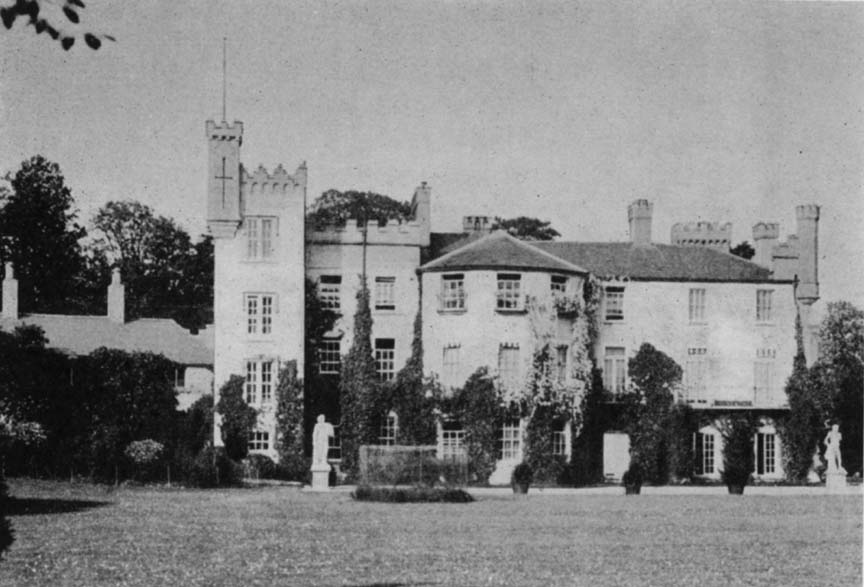
Castle Bellingham, County Louth

Evidence of ancient settlement in the area include fulacht fiadh, fosse (ring ditch) and a motte and bailey site in the surrounding townlands of Castlebellingham, Greenmount and Kilsaran. A religious house in Kilsaran townland, of which no trace is visible and which had a reputed association with the Knights Templar, is recorded in some texts.

From at least 1301, the area was known as Gernonstown (also spelled Gernoun or Garland), a reference to the prominent Anglo-Norman family which had significant lands in County Louth. It is believed the name originated from Montfiquet in Normandy. The surname is derived from the old French word gernon, meaning "moustache", likely a nickname for an ancestor.

=== Castle Bellingham ===
The castle of Castlebellingham served as one of the ancestral homes of members of the eponymous Bellingham family from the 17th century to the mid-20th century. The family originated in the small town of Kendal, Westmorland in England. The original ancestor of the Irish Bellinghams, Alan Bellingham, hailed from here. Henry Bellingham (d.1676), a descendant of Alan was a cavalry officer who first came to Ireland during the English Civil War. The lands of Gernonstown were granted to Henry during the Cromwellian Settlement, in which a large amount of native Irish lands were given to Englishmen in reward for their service. Henry is named in the list of grantees under the Acts of Settlement and Explanation of Charles II s. In 1666, Charles II formally granted the lands to him for his ‘faithful service as a good soldier in the late wars’. The castle was rebuilt by Thomas Bellingham in the 1690s following the first castle's destruction by Jacobites during the Williamite War in Ireland.

The calvary near the castle was built by Sir Alan Henry Bellingham (1846–1921) in memory of his first wife, Lady Constance. A collection of inset religious panels is to be seen on the upper facades of many of the village buildings. These are also a reflection of Sir Henry's religious sentiments, and they are unique in Ireland. In addition to the many panels, there are biblical quotations cut into the stone window sills of some buildings. North of the castle is a carefully preserved group of "widows' dwellings", built from charitable motives by Sir Henry. The war memorial in the village was built in the Celtic style in 1920 and was unveiled by Cardinal Logue.

Castlebellingham was home to the Bellinghams until the late 1950s. The last Bellingham to live there was Brigadier General Sir Edward Bellingham, born in 1879, last Lord Lieutenant of Louth (1921), and Guardian of the Rolls (Custos Rotulorum). He was then elected to the Irish free State Senate from 1925 to 1936. The house was purchased by Dermot Meehan in 1958 from the Irish Land Commission for £3,065.00. Meehan spent several years converting the house into the Bellingham Castle Hotel, which remains today. Meehan sold the hotel and 17 acres in 1967 for £30,636.61.

The hotel, including the 17 acres, was offered for sale at €1,500,000 in 2011. In December 2012, the hotel was bought by the Corscadden family, who also own and run Cabra Castle Hotel in Kingscourt, County Cavan and Ballyseede Castle Hotel in Tralee, County Kerry. Bellingham Castle has also been a wedding venue since 1905.

== Transport ==
Castlebellingham railway station opened on 1 April 1851, but finally closed on 6 September 1976.

The opening of a section of the M1 motorway between Dunleer and Dundalk, in early 2001, reduced the volume of road traffic through the village. A motorway service area, on the M1, was opened at Castlebellingham in September 2010.

== Sport ==
The local Gaelic football team, O'Connells GFC, won their first Louth Intermediate Football Championship in 2012. After victories over Laois and Meath opposition, they narrowly lost to Monasterevin of Kildare in the 2012 Leinster Intermediate Championship final.

== See also ==
- List of towns and villages in Ireland
