= Henry Chester (MP) =

Irish politician

Henry Chester (died 1855) was an Irish politician.

Living at Cartown, near Drogheda, Chester became a deputy-lieutenant and magistrate of County Louth. Chester was appointed as High Sheriff of Louth in 1837, unusually for a Catholic whose name was not put forward by judges. However, he wished to contest the 1837 UK general election in County Louth as a Whig. He was permitted to resign as High Sheriff in order to stand, and won the seat. However, he resigned in 1840 by accepting the Chiltern Hundreds.

Parliament of the United Kingdom
Preceded by Richard Bellew; Patrick Bellew	Member of Parliament for County Louth; 1837–1840; With: Richard Bellew	Succeeded by Richard Bellew; Thomas Fortescue
