= South Louth =

Westminster constituency in Ireland, 1885–1918

- Former county constituency for the House of Commons

1885–1918
- Seats: 1
- Created from: County Louth and Drogheda
- Replaced by: County Louth

South Louth was a parliamentary constituency in Ireland, which returned one Member of Parliament (MP) to the House of Commons of the Parliament of the United Kingdom, elected on a system of first-past-the-post, from 1885 to 1918. Prior to the 1885 general election and after the dissolution of Parliament in 1918 the area was part of the Louth constituency.

== Boundaries ==
This constituency comprised the southern part of County Louth including the towns of Drogheda and Ardee. The seat was defined under the Redistribution of Seats Act 1885 as comprising the baronies of Drogheda and Ferrard, that part of the barony of Ardee not contained within the constituency of North Louth, and the county of the town of Drogheda.

== Members of Parliament ==
Years	Member	Party
1885–1890	T. P. Gill	Irish Parliamentary Party
1891–1892	T. P. Gill	Irish National Federation
1892–1895	Daniel Ambrose	Irish National Federation
1896–1900	Richard McGhee	Irish National Federation
1900–1901	Joseph Nolan	Independent Nationalist
1901–1918	Joseph Nolan	Irish Parliamentary Party
1918	constituency abolished: see County Louth	

== Elections ==
The elections in this constituency took place using the first past the post electoral system.

=== Elections in the 1880s ===
1885 general election: South Louth
Party	Candidate	Votes	%	±%
Irish Parliamentary	T. P. Gill	Unopposed		
Registered electors		5,796		
Irish Parliamentary win (new seat)				

1886 general election: South Louth
Party	Candidate	Votes	%	±%
Irish Parliamentary	T. P. Gill	Unopposed		
Registered electors		5,796		
Irish Parliamentary hold				

=== Elections in the 1890s ===
1892 general election: South Louth
Party	Candidate	Votes	%	±%
Irish National Federation	Daniel Ambrose	2,451	68.5	N/A
Irish National League	Joseph Nolan	1,126	31.5	N/A
Majority		1,325	37.0	N/A
Turnout		3,577	66.0	N/A
Registered electors		5,418		
Irish National Federation gain from Irish Parliamentary		Swing	N/A	

1895 general election: South Louth
Party	Candidate	Votes	%	±%
Irish National Federation	Daniel Ambrose	2,006	65.8	−2.7
Irish National League	James Gubbins Fitzgerald	1,044	34.2	+2.7
Majority		962	31.6	−5.4
Turnout		3,050	58.4	−7.6
Registered electors		5,221		
Irish National Federation hold		Swing	−2.7	

Ambrose's death causes a by-election.

By-Election 19 March 1896: South Louth
Party	Candidate	Votes	%	±%
Irish National Federation	Richard McGhee	1,626	48.8	−17.0
Irish National League	J. P. Nolan	1,249	37.5	+3.3
Ind. Nationalist	Philip Callan	459	13.8	New
Majority		377	11.3	−20.3
Turnout		3,334	64.7	+6.3
Registered electors		5,155		
Irish National Federation hold		Swing	−10.2	

=== Elections in the 1900s ===
1900 general election: South Louth
Party	Candidate	Votes	%	±%
Ind. Nationalist	Joseph Nolan	1,233	56.9	N/A
Irish Parliamentary	Richard McGhee	934	43.1	N/A
Majority		299	13.8	N/A
Turnout		2,167	39.5	−18.9
Registered electors		5,480		
Ind. Nationalist gain from Irish Parliamentary		Swing		

1906 general election: South Louth
Party	Candidate	Votes	%	±%
Irish Parliamentary	Joseph Nolan	Unopposed		
Registered electors		4,997		
Irish Parliamentary gain from Ind. Nationalist				

=== Elections in the 1910s ===
January 1910 general election: South Louth
Party	Candidate	Votes	%	±%
Irish Parliamentary	Joseph Nolan	Unopposed		
Registered electors		4,802		
Irish Parliamentary hold				

December 1910 general election: South Louth
Party	Candidate	Votes	%	±%
Irish Parliamentary	Joseph Nolan	Unopposed		
Registered electors		4,802		
Irish Parliamentary hold				
