= Dundalk (UK Parliament constituency) =

UK parliamentary constituency in Ireland, 1801–1885

- Former borough constituency for the House of Commons
- County: County Louth
- Borough: Dundalk

1801–1885
- Seats: 1
- Created from: Dundalk
- Replaced by: North Louth

Dundalk was a parliamentary borough constituency in Ireland, which returned one Member of Parliament (MP) to the House of Commons of the United Kingdom from 1801 to 1885.

== History ==
It was an original constituency represented in Parliament when the Union of Great Britain and Ireland took effect on 1 January 1801, succeeding the Dundalk constituency in the Parliament of Ireland. The constituency had been two-member borough constituency in the Irish House of Commons, which became a single-member United Kingdom constituency when the union of Great Britain and Ireland took effect on 1 January 1801.

The first member of the United Kingdom House of Commons was to be selected from the area's two MPs in the Irish Parliament, by drawing lots. However both members had resigned, so the seat could not be filled by co-option and a by-election was necessary. The by-election took place on 28 February 1801. Isaac Corry, the Chancellor of the Exchequer of Ireland, was elected the first United Kingdom MP for Dundalk. Corry was associated with what came to be called the Tory Party after the death of William Pitt the Younger in 1806.

Dundalk had a population of 9,256 in 1821. Walker records that the electorate in 1831 numbered 36. The population in 1831 had increased to 10,750. All the elections in the borough between 1801 and 1831 were unopposed returns. Up until the extension of the franchise under the Representation of the People (Ireland) Act 1832, the borough was strongly Tory in representation. The 1832 general election was conducted on a new franchise. No Tory or Conservative was elected after 1832. The registered electorate, under the new system, numbered 318. At the borough's first contested election of the century, 295 people voted (Liberal 167, Conservative 128).

From 1832 to 1885 the constituency returned members who were Liberals or who belonged to a series of Irish-based groups (the Repeal Association, the Independent Irish Party and the Home Rule League). The Liberals elected in Dundalk tended to have nationalist leanings.

The borough was disfranchised under the Redistribution of Seats Act 1885, which took effect at the 1885 general election.

The last MP for the constituency was the Liberal lawyer-politician, Charles Russell. An Irish-born Catholic, Russell was to be the lead counsel for Charles Stewart Parnell during the inquiry into allegations which had appeared in The Times. In March 1887 it had been suggested that Parnell was complicit in the murders of the Chief Secretary for Ireland Lord Frederick Cavendish and the Permanent Under-Secretary for Ireland, T. H. Burke. Letters were produced to support the allegations. As a result of Russell's cross-examination of Richard Pigott, the forger of the letters, the Commission of Enquiry vindicated Parnell.

== Boundaries ==
This constituency was the parliamentary borough of Dundalk in County Louth. In November 1831, boundary commissioners proposed boundaries for the borough. It was defined by the Parliamentary Boundaries (Ireland) Act 1832 as:

From the Point on the East of the Town, about Eight hundred Yards from the Enclosure Wall of the Cavalry Barracks, at which a Road which runs from the Sea-shore through the Marshes to Black Rock leaves the Sea-shore, along such Road to the Point at which the same meets the Boundary of the Lower Marsh Townland; thence, Westward, along the Boundary of the Lower Marsh Townland to the Point at which the same reaches the Bridge on the Dublin Road; thence in a straight Line for about One hundred Yards in a South-westerly Direction to the nearest Point of the Boundary of the Town Parks; thence, Westward, along the Boundary of the Town Parks to the Point at which the same meets the Boundary of Lord Roden’s Demesne; thence, Eastward, along the Boundary of Lord Roden’s Demesne to the Point at which the same meets the Boundary between the Parishes of Dundalk and Castletown, excluding the whole of the Demesne; thence, Northward, along the Boundary between the Parishes of Dundalk and Castletown to the Point at which the same meets the Boundary of the Town Parks at the River; thence, Eastward, along the Boundary of the Town Parks to the Bridge on the Newry Road; thence along the Southern Shore of the Bay of Dundalk to the Point first described.

== Members of Parliament ==
Election	Member	Party	Note
1801, 1 January	seat vacant	...	Both members in the Irish Parliament had resigned
1801, 28 February	Rt Hon. Isaac Corry	Tory	
1802, 15 July	Richard Archdall	Tory	
1806, 22 November	John Metge	Tory	Resigned (appointed Escheator of Munster)
1807, 20 January	Josias Porcher	Tory	1807, May: Also returned by and elected to sit for Old Sarum
1807, 4 August	Patrick Bruce		Resigned (appointed Steward of the Manor of East Hendred)
1808, 27 July	Thomas Hughan		Died
1812, 21 February	Frederick Trench	Tory	
1812, 26 October	John Metge	Tory	Resigned (appointed Escheator of Munster)
1813, 2 January	Lyndon Evelyn	Tory	
1818, 29 June	Gerrard Callaghan	Tory	
1820, 24 March	John Metge	Tory	Resigned (appointed Escheator of Munster)
1820, 29 June	George Hartopp	Tory	Died
1824, 5 May	Sir Robert Inglis, Bt	Tory	
1826, 12 June	Charles Barclay	Tory	
1830, 14 August	Hon. John Hobart Caradoc	Whig	
1831, 13 May	James Edward Gordon	Tory	
1832, 19 December	William O'Reilly	Whig	
1835, 14 January	William Sharman Crawford	Radical	
1837, 2 August	Thomas Nicholas Redington	Whig	Appointed Under-Secretary to the Lord Lieutenant
1846, 31 July	Daniel O'Connell Jnr	Repeal Association	
1847, 6 August	Charles MacTavish	Repeal Association	Unseated on petition
1848, 20 March	William Torrens McCullagh	Whig	Declared duly elected, on petition
1852, 15 July	Sir George Bowyer, Bt	Independent Irish Party	
1857, 2 April	Sir George Bowyer, Bt	Whig	
1859, 2 May	Sir George Bowyer, Bt	Liberal	
1868, 21 November	Philip Callan	Liberal	Re-elected as a Home Rule League candidate
1874, 5 February	Philip Callan	Home Rule League	Also returned by County Louth, but elects to sit here
1880, 2 April	Charles Russell	Liberal	Last MP from the constituency
1885	Constituency abolished		

== Elections ==
=== Elections in the 1830s ===
General election 1830: Dundalk
Party	Candidate	Votes	%
Whig	John Hobart Caradoc	Unopposed	
Registered electors		c. 32	
Whig gain from Tory			

General election 1831: Dundalk
Party	Candidate	Votes	%
Tory	James Edward Gordon (MP)	Unopposed	
Registered electors		36	
Tory gain from Whig			

General election 1832: Dundalk
Party	Candidate	Votes	%
Whig	William O'Reilly	167	56.6
Tory	John Jocelyn	128	43.4
Majority		39	13.2
Turnout		295	92.8
Registered electors		318	
Whig gain from Tory			

General election 1835: Dundalk
Party	Candidate	Votes	%
Radical	William Sharman Crawford	Unopposed	
Registered electors		376	
Radical gain from Whig			

General election 1837: Dundalk
Party	Candidate	Votes	%
Whig	Thomas Nicholas Redington	Unopposed	
Registered electors		557	
Whig gain from Radical			

=== Elections in the 1840s ===
General election 1841: Dundalk
Party	Candidate	Votes	%	±%
Whig	Thomas Nicholas Redington	Unopposed		
Registered electors		538		
Whig hold				

Redington resigned after being appointed Under-Secretary for Ireland, causing a by-election.

By-election, 31 July 1846: Dundalk
Party	Candidate	Votes	%	±%
Repeal	Daniel O'Connell	Unopposed		
Repeal gain from Whig				

General election 1847: Dundalk
Party	Candidate	Votes	%	±%
Repeal	Charles MacTavish	124	50.6	N/A
Whig	William McCullagh	121	49.4	N/A
Majority		3	1.2	N/A
Turnout		245	50.2	N/A
Registered electors		488		
Repeal gain from Whig				

Upon petition, MacTavish was unseated and McCullagh was declared elected on 20 March 1848

=== Elections in the 1850s ===
General election 1852: Dundalk
Party	Candidate	Votes	%	±%
Independent Irish	George Bowyer	Unopposed		
Registered electors		267		
Independent Irish gain from Repeal				

General election 1857: Dundalk
Party	Candidate	Votes	%	±%
Whig	George Bowyer	133	77.3	New
Independent Irish	John MacNamara Cantwell	39	22.7	N/A
Majority		94	54.6	N/A
Turnout		172	67.2	N/A
Registered electors		256		
Whig gain from Independent Irish		Swing	N/A	

General election 1859: Dundalk
Party	Candidate	Votes	%	±%
Liberal	George Bowyer	Unopposed		
Registered electors		293		
Liberal hold				

=== Elections in the 1860s ===
General election 1865: Dundalk
Party	Candidate	Votes	%	±%
Liberal	George Bowyer	Unopposed		
Registered electors		287		
Liberal hold				

General election 1868: Dundalk
Party	Candidate	Votes	%	±%
Liberal	Philip Callan	164	43.2	N/A
Liberal	Charles Russell	143	37.6	N/A
Liberal	George Bowyer	72	18.9	N/A
Independent	William Robson	1	0.3	New
Majority		21	5.6	N/A
Turnout		380	85.0	N/A
Registered electors		447		
Liberal hold		Swing	N/A	

=== Elections in the 1870s ===
General election 1874: Dundalk
Party	Candidate	Votes	%	±%
Home Rule	Philip Callan	257	53.3	New
Liberal	Charles Russell	225	46.7	−51.0
Majority		32	6.6	+1.0
Turnout		482	82.4	−2.6
Registered electors		585		
Home Rule gain from Liberal		Swing	+0.5	

=== Elections in the 1880s ===
General election 1880: Dundalk
Party	Candidate	Votes	%	±%
Liberal	Charles Russell	263	54.1	+7.4
Home Rule	Philip Callan	214	44.0	−9.3
Conservative	James Davis	9	1.9	New
Majority		49	10.1	N/A
Turnout		486	86.3	+3.9
Registered electors		563		
Liberal gain from Home Rule		Swing	+8.4	
