= Daniel Ambrose =

Politician in United Kingdom (1843–1895)

Member of Parliament for South Louth
- In office 1892–1896
- Preceded by: T. P. Gill
- Succeeded by: Richard McGhee

Personal details
- Born: c. 1843
- Died: 17 December, 1895 (aged 51–52)

Daniel Ambrose (c. 1843 – 17 December 1895) was a medical practitioner and an Irish nationalist politician and member of parliament (MP) in the House of Commons of the United Kingdom of Great Britain and Ireland. He was born in Loughill Co Limerick and his parents were Stephen Ambrose, from Ardagh and Margaret Kennedy from Adare.

He was elected as an Irish National Federation (Anti-Parnellite) MP for the South Louth constituency at the 1892 general election. He was re-elected at the 1895 general election, but died in office in December 1895. The by-election for his seat was won by the Anti-Parnellite Richard McGhee.

His cousin, Robert Ambrose, also served as an Anti-Parnellite MP.

Parliament of the United Kingdom
Preceded by T. P. Gill	Member of Parliament for South Louth; 1892 – 1896	Succeeded by Richard McGhee
