= Matthew Dease =

Irish Liberal politician

Matthew Dease MP

Member of Parliament for County Louth
- In office 24 November 1868 – 14 February 1874 Serving with Chichester Parkinson-Fortescue
- Preceded by: Tristram Kennedy; Chichester Parkinson-Fortescue
- Succeeded by: Alexander Martin Sullivan; Philip Callan

Personal details
- Born: 1819
- Died: 17 August 1887 (aged 68)
- Party: Liberal
- Parent(s): Richard Dease; Anna Maria O'Reilly

Matthew O'Reilly Dease (1819 – 17 August 1887) was an Irish Liberal politician.

Dease was the son of Richard Dease and Anna Maria O'Reilly, daughter of Matthew O'Reilly. He was born in Dublin and educated at Trinity College, Dublin.

He was elected unopposed as one of the two Members of Parliament (MPs) for County Louth at the 1868 general election but was defeated at the next election in 1874.

He was also a Justice of the Peace and Deputy Lieutenant for County Louth. He was High Sheriff of Louth for 1857, and for County Cavan in 1861.

Dease owned a significant amount of land across Ireland, 6,488 acres in all, including land in Ballyamona, County Limerick, Charleville in County Louth (nearly 2,000 acres), County Cavan, County Meath, and Dublin. His largest estate, at 2,366 acres, was in County Mayo, and was sold to the Congested Districts' Board on 2 December 1898. His entailed estates in County Louth were inherited by Edmond O'Conor of Charleville, a distant relative.

Parliament of the United Kingdom
Preceded by Tristram Kennedy; Chichester Parkinson-Fortescue	Member of Parliament for County Louth; 1868 – 1874; With: Chichester Parkinson-Fortescue	Succeeded by Alexander Martin Sullivan; Philip Callan
