= Hippisley baronets =

Escutcheon of the Hippisley baronets of Warfield

The Hippisley baronetcy, of Warfield in the County of Berkshire, was a title in the Baronetage of Great Britain. It was created on 10 May 1796 for the barrister, diplomat and politician John Hippisley. He was Member of Parliament for Sudbury from 1790 to 1796, and 1802 to 1818.

The title became extinct on the death of his son, the 2nd Baronet, in 1867.

== Hippisley baronets, of Warfield (1796) ==
- Sir John Coxe Hippisley, 1st Baronet (c. 1748–1825)
- Sir John Stuart Hippisley, 2nd Baronet (1790–1867)

Baronetage of Great Britain
Preceded by Bellingham baronets	Hippisley baronets of Castle Bellingham; 10 May 1796	Succeeded by Amcotts baronets
