= John McClintock, 1st Baron Rathdonnell =

Irish conservative MP

John McClintock, 1st Baron Rathdonnell (26 August 1798 – 17 May 1879), was an Irish Conservative peer and Member of Parliament.

== Biography ==
He was the eldest son of John McClintock, an Irish magistrate for County Louth, and formerly Serjeant at Arms in the Irish House of Commons. His mother was Jane, the only daughter of William Bunbury, Esq of Moyle. Jane was sister to Thomas Bunbury, MP for County Carlow. McClintock was appointed High Sheriff of Louth in 1840 and elected Member of Parliament for County Louth in 1857, a seat he held until 1859. He later served as Lord Lieutenant of County Louth from 1867 until his death in 1879. On 21 December 1868 he was raised to the Peerage of Ireland as Baron Rathdonnell, of Rathdonnell in the County of Donegal, with remainder to the male issue of his deceased younger brother Captain William McClintock-Bunbury. It was to be the second last title granted in the Irish peerage.

Lord Rathdonnell was married to Anne Lefroy, sister of Sir John Henry Lefroy, and they lived between Drumcar, County Louth, and their London house at 80 Chester Square. The marriage was childless. Rathdonnell was also an uncle of the Arctic explorer Sir Francis Leopold McClintock. Lord Rathdonnell died in May 1879, aged 80. He was succeeded in the Barony according to the special remainder by his nephew Thomas McClintock-Bunbury, who notably served as Lord Lieutenant of County Carlow and as President of the Royal Dublin Society.

== Arms ==
Coat of arms of John McClintock, 1st Baron Rathdonnell
Crest A lion passant Proper. Escutcheon Per pale Gules and Azure a chevron Ermine between three escallop shells Argent. Supporters Dexter a lion and sinister a leopard both Proper each gorged with a collar Ermine and each charged on the shoulder with an escallop Argent. Motto Virtute Et Labore

Parliament of the United Kingdom
Preceded by Chichester Fortescue; Tristram Kennedy	Member of Parliament for County Louth; 1857–1859; With: Chichester Fortescue	Succeeded by Chichester Fortescue; Richard Montesquieu Bellew
Honorary titles
Preceded by The Lord Bellew	Lord Lieutenant of Louth; 1867–1879	Succeeded by The Viscount Massereene
Peerage of Ireland
New creation	Baron Rathdonnell; 1868–1879	Succeeded by Thomas McClintock-Bunbury
