= 1869 County Louth by-election =

UK parliamentary by-election

The 1869 County Louth by-election was contested on 11 January 1869. The by-election was held because the incumbent Liberal MP, Chichester Fortescue, had become the Chief Secretary for Ireland. Under the law at the time if an MP attained certain government positions, they were required to resign their seat and run for it again. The seat was retained by Fortescue. The number of electors was 2443.
