= Richard McGhee =

Irish nationalist politician (1851–1930)

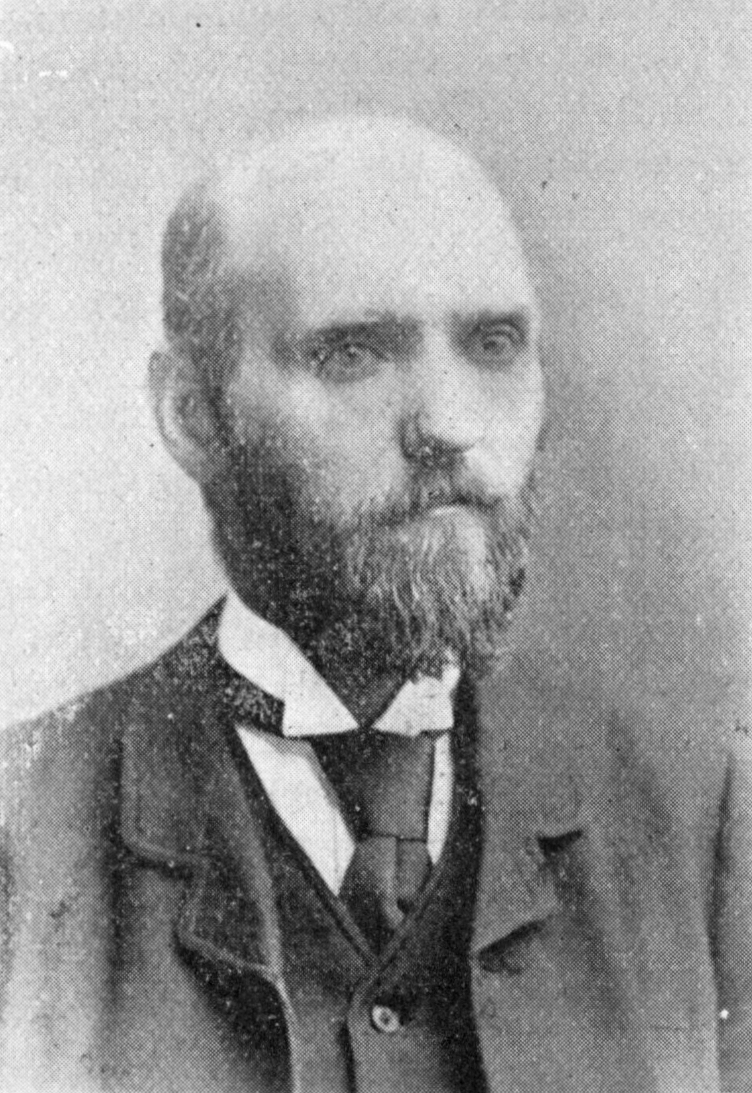
McGhee c. 1899

Richard McGhee (1851 –7 April 1930) was an Irish Protestant Nationalist home rule politician. A Georgist Land League and trade union activist, he was a Member of Parliament (MP) in the House of Commons of the United Kingdom of Great Britain and Ireland for more than 20 years.

== Family and education ==
McGhee was born in Lurgan, County Armagh in January or early February 1851, the son of a tenant farmer who later became a shopkeeper. McGhee was educated at the local school in Lurgan and then went to Glasgow to become an engineering apprentice. In 1880 he married Mary Campbell, who lived until 1949. They had five sons and a daughter. One of his sons was Henry McGhee who became the Labour MP for Penistone from 1935 to 1959.

== Career ==
McGhee was a merchant with connections to industry in County Antrim. He specialised in cutlery and stationery. In the 1880s he became involved in labour and trade union causes. He belonged to the American Knights of Labor which had set up some branches in Britain and by 1887 was one of their organisers in Cradley Heath in the Black Country of the West Midlands. The Knights then sent McGhee to Glasgow to recruit new members. McGhee stepped up his labour activism and developed an interest in radical causes, particularly Irish Home Rule even though he was a Protestant, a member of the Church of Ireland. He was a committed follower of the American political economist Henry George and George's policies around land reform and was prominent in the Irish Land League. In 1889 McGhee was a co-founder of the National Union of Dock Labourers (NUDL) and was for a time its president. In 1893 McGhee resigned from the NUDL but continued to be active in related trade unionism becoming an executive council member of the International Federation of Ship, Dock and River Workers, later the International Transport Workers' Federation and he worked with the National Union of Seamen on various campaigns to improve working conditions.

== Politics ==
As a strong supporter of Home Rule, McGhee was engaged in political activity and sought a nomination for a Parliamentary seat. In March 1896 he was elected the Nationalist member for South Louth in a by-election and he held the seat until 1900. His by-election platform was home rule on advanced nationalist principles, the endorsement of Catholic demands on education, the complete abolition of landlordism, and support for labourers. After losing his seat in 1900 he returned to the House of Commons at the December 1910 general election to represent Mid Tyrone, beating the sitting Unionist MP, Gerald Fitzgibbon Brunskill, by a majority of 723 votes. He held the seat until it was abolished in 1918.

As an MP, McGhee was described as an orthodox Irish nationalist. In 1917 one of his meetings in Omagh was broken up by Sinn Féin supporters. McGhee supported the Irish nationalist leader John Redmond and endorsed his decision in 1914 to support the British and Allied war effort at the outbreak of World War I and his condemnation of the Easter rising of 1916. But the reaction of the British government to the rising and the suspension of the Home Rule Act 1914 which Redmond had negotiated and which would have granted a strong measure of Home Rule, destroyed Redmond and his movement to achieve Home Rule through constitutional Parliamentary means. McGhee did not seek re-election in 1918.

== Death ==
McGhee died at his home in Glasgow on 7 April 1930.

Parliament of the United Kingdom
Preceded by Daniel Ambrose	Member of Parliament for South Louth; 1896 – 1900	Succeeded by Joseph Nolan
Preceded by Gerald Brunskill	Member of Parliament for Mid Tyrone; December 1910 – 1918	abolished
