= Elaine Bellew-Bryan, Baroness Bellew =

South Africa-born Irish nurse (1885–1973)

Elaine, Lady Bellew
- Bellew in 1934
- Born: 1885; South Africa
- Died: 7 March 1973 (aged 87–88); Kilkenny, Ireland

Elaine Carlisle Bellew-Bryan, Baroness Bellew (1885 – 7 March 1973), served in the First World War as a nurse and was one of the first women to be a member of the corporation in Kilkenny, from 1955 until 1973.

== Early life ==
Elaine Carlisle Leach was born in 1885 in South Africa to John Benjamin Leach and Emma Frances Leach (née Fichat), known as Dolly. Bellew married Herbert Lloyd-Dodd in South Africa where she was trained as a nurse. He died in 1914. She served during the First World War, first in the Richmond Military Hospital and then as part of the Voluntary Aid Detachment She was mentioned in dispatches during the war.

== Life in Ireland ==
She then married George Bellew-Bryan, 4th Baron Bellew, on 9 April 1927. She met him while he was on a trip to Libya, which was then part of the Italian Empire. She became known as Elaine, Lady Bellew. She moved to Jenkinstown House outside Kilkenny city and became very involved in local activities. She became a member of the Kilkenny Archaeological Society. She ran auctions from the house. She was well known as speaking her mind. Lady Bellew was also known for her gardens.

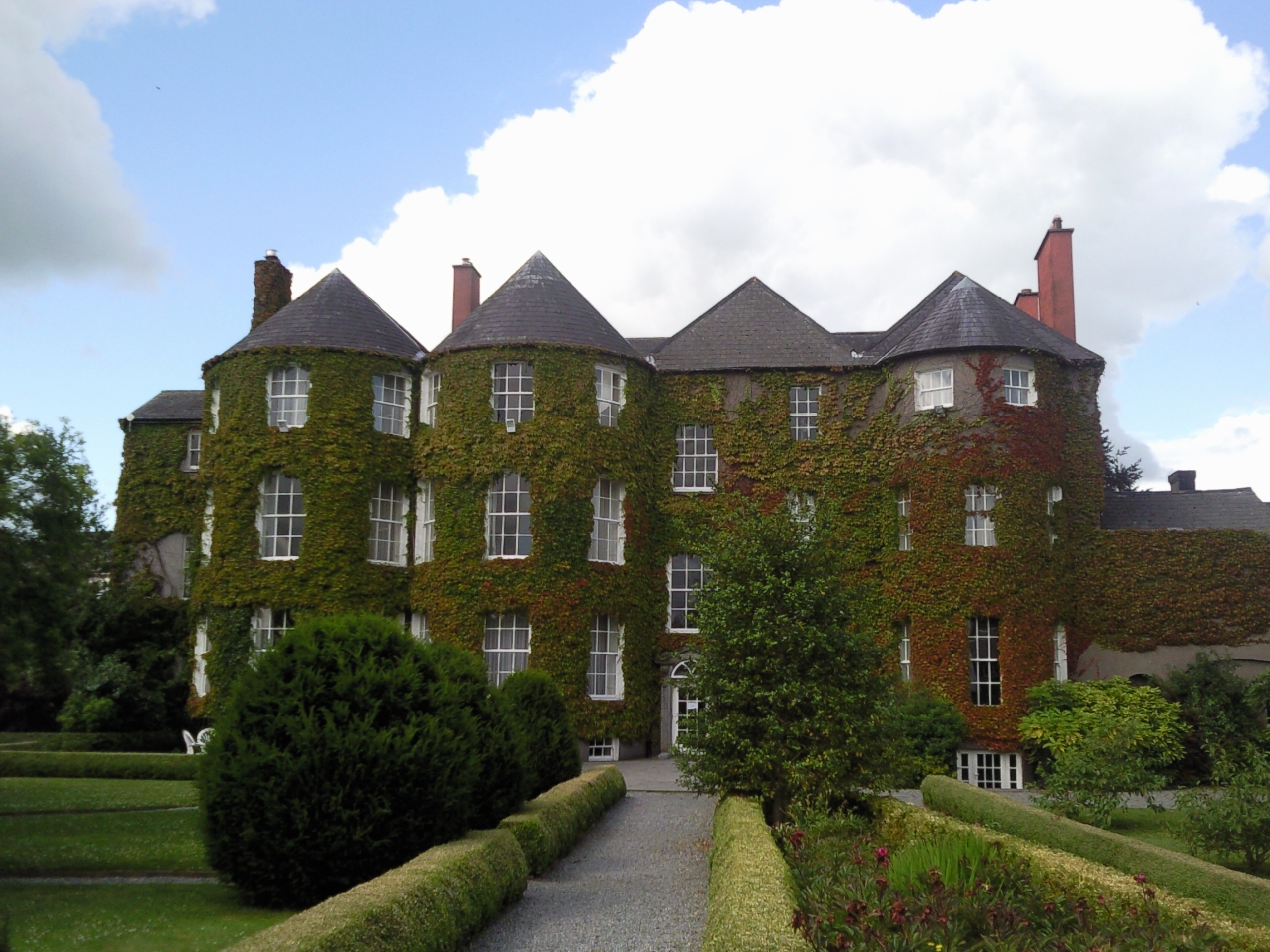
Butler House

Lady Bellew began a fete in Jenkinstown c. 1930 and this continued until the 1940s. Proceeds were given to the Jubilee Nurses Organisation. She also held dances to support the District Nursing Association of which she was president. Her husband died in 1935 and the property in Jenkinstown passed to his heir. As a result, Lady Bellew moved into the city to live. Initially she lived in Rosemount House and then moved into Butler House. She was given an annuity of £500 per year. This was when she became more involved in the activities in the city itself. She became a councillor for Kilkenny from 1955 until 1973.

The Rt Hon. Elaine, Dowager Baroness Bellew, died on 7 March 1973, and is buried at St. Kieran's Cemetery in Kilkenny.
