= 1874 County Louth by-election =

UK Parliamentary by-election

The 1874 County Louth by-election was fought on 8 April 1874. The by-election was fought due to the double Election, chose to sit for Dundalk of the incumbent Home Rule MP, Philip Callan. It was won by the Home Rule candidate George Harley Kirk.

1874 County Louth by-election (1 seat)
Party	Candidate	Votes	%	±%
Home Rule	George Kirk	997	66.3	−7.5
Home Rule	Bernard Charles Molloy	507	33.7	+7.4
Majority		490	32.6	+14.7
Turnout		1,504	64.9	−14.3
Registered electors		2,316		
Home Rule hold		Swing	-7.5	
