= List of fellows of the Royal Society elected in 1819 =

Fellows of the Royal Society elected in 1819.

== Fellows ==
1. Clarke Abel (1780–1826)
2. Robert Barlow (1757–1843)
3. Henry Thomas de la Beche (1796–1855)
4. John Brooke (1773–1821)
5. Henry James Brooke (1771–1857)
6. Joshua Brookes (1761–1833)
7. George Butler (1774–1853)
8. John Douglas Edward Henry Campbell (1777–1847)
9. Thomas Chevalier (1767–1824)
10. Sir George Clerk (1787–1867)
11. George Lewis Newnham Collingwood (1782–1837)
12. William Daniel Conybeare (1787–1857)
13. John Hutton Cooper (1765–1828)
14. George Gilbert Currey (d. 1822)
15. George Dollond (1774–1852)
16. Henry Ellis (1777–1855)
17. John Fisher (1748–1825)
18. John Leslie Foster (d. 1842)
19. Benjamin Gompertz (1779–1865)
20. Thomas Greatorex (1758–1831)
21. Robert Hamilton (d. 1832)
22. George Hunt (1789–1861)
23. James Devereux Hustler (d. 1850)
24. Jeremiah Ives (1777–1829)
25. Archibald Kennedy (1770–1846)
26. Charles Henry Bellenden Ker (1785–1871)
27. Francis Lunn (1795–1839)
28. Colin Mackenzie (1753–1821)
29. George Magrath (1775–1857)
30. Alfred Le Marchant (b. 1819)
31. Frederick Marryat (1792–1848)
32. Murray Maxwell (1775–1831)
33. James Justinian Morier (1780–1849)
34. Charles Savill Onley (1757–1843)
35. George Ormerod (1785–1873)
36. William Pearson (1767–1847)
37. Thomas Phillips (1770–1845)
38. Archibald John Primrose (1783–1868)
39. William Prout (1785–1850)
40. John Spratt Rainier (d. 1822)
41. John Ramsbottom (d. 1845)
42. Joseph Smith (1775–1857)
43. Charles Tweedie (1799–1821)
44. Henry Walter (1785–1859)
45. Grant David Yeats (1773–1836)

== Foreign members ==
1. Felipe Bauza (1764–1834)
2. Francisco de Borja Garção Stockler (1759–1829)

== Royal fellows ==
1. Maximilian Joseph (1782–1863)
