= Thomas FitzGerald (County Louth politician) =

Irish politician and slave trader

Thomas FitzGerald (died October/November 1834) was an Irish politician and slave trader. FitzGerald worked as a merchant and became wealthy in the West Indies. The Centre for the Study of the Legacies of British Slavery states that he was probably the owner of Richmond Hill in Demerera, and as having been a slave factor in the colony as of 1807.

In 1823, FitzGerald returned to Ireland, where he purchased Fane Valley in County Louth. At the 1832 UK general election, he stood in County Louth for the Repeal Association, and won election. He died in 1834, while still in office.

FitzGerald had two sons: Thomas Christopher, and Percy Hetherington Fitzgerald.

Parliament of the United Kingdom
Preceded by Patrick Bellew; Richard Lalor Sheil	Member of Parliament for Louth; 1832 – 1834; With: Richard Bellew	Succeeded by Patrick Bellew; Richard Bellew
