= Patrick Bellew, 1st Baron Bellew =

Irish Whig politician

Patrick Bellew, 1st Baron Bellew PC (Ire) (29 January 1798 – 10 December 1866), known as Sir Patrick Bellew, 7th Baronet, from 1827 to 1848, was an Irish Whig politician.

== Early life ==
Born in London, he was born as the second son of Sir Edward Bellew, 6th Baronet (1760-1827), and his wife Mary Anne Strange (1760-1837), daughter of Richard Strange of Rockwell Castle. He succeeded his father as baronet in 1827.

== Career ==
In 1831, he was elected to the House of Commons for County Louth, a seat he held until 1832. He was reelected for the constituency in 1834, representing it for the next three years. Bellew served as high sheriff of County Louth in 1831 and was then appointed lord lieutenant of Louth until his death in 1866. He was also commissioner of national education in Ireland from 1839 to 1866 and a commissioner of charitable donations and bequests for Ireland from 1844 to 1857. He was admitted to the Irish Privy Council in 1838 and in 1848 he was raised to the Peerage of Ireland as Baron Bellew, of Barmeath, in the County of Louth.

== Personal life ==
Bellew married Spanish noblewoman Anna Fermina de Mendoza (1800–1857), only daughter of Admiral Don José Maria de Mendoza y Rios (1761-1816), in 1829. She died in 1857. Bellew survived her by nine years and died in December 1866, aged 68. He was succeeded in his titles by his son Edward.

== Notes ==
Parliament of the United Kingdom
Preceded by Alexander Dawson; Richard Lalor Sheil	Member of Parliament for County Louth; 1831–1832; With: Richard Lalor Sheil	Succeeded by Thomas FitzGerald; Richard Montesquieu Bellew
Preceded by Thomas FitzGerald; Richard Montesquieu Bellew	Member of Parliament for County Louth; 1834–1837; With: Richard Montesquieu Bellew	Succeeded by Richard Montesquieu Bellew; Henry Chester
Honorary titles
New office	Lord Lieutenant of Louth; 1831–1866	Succeeded by John McClintock
Peerage of Ireland
New creation	Baron Bellew; 1848–1866	Succeeded by Edward Joseph Bellew
Baronetage of Ireland
Preceded by Edward Bellew	Baronet (of Barmeath); 1827–1866	Succeeded by Edward Joseph Bellew
