= T. P. Gill =

Irish journalist and politician (1858–1931)

Thomas Patrick Gill
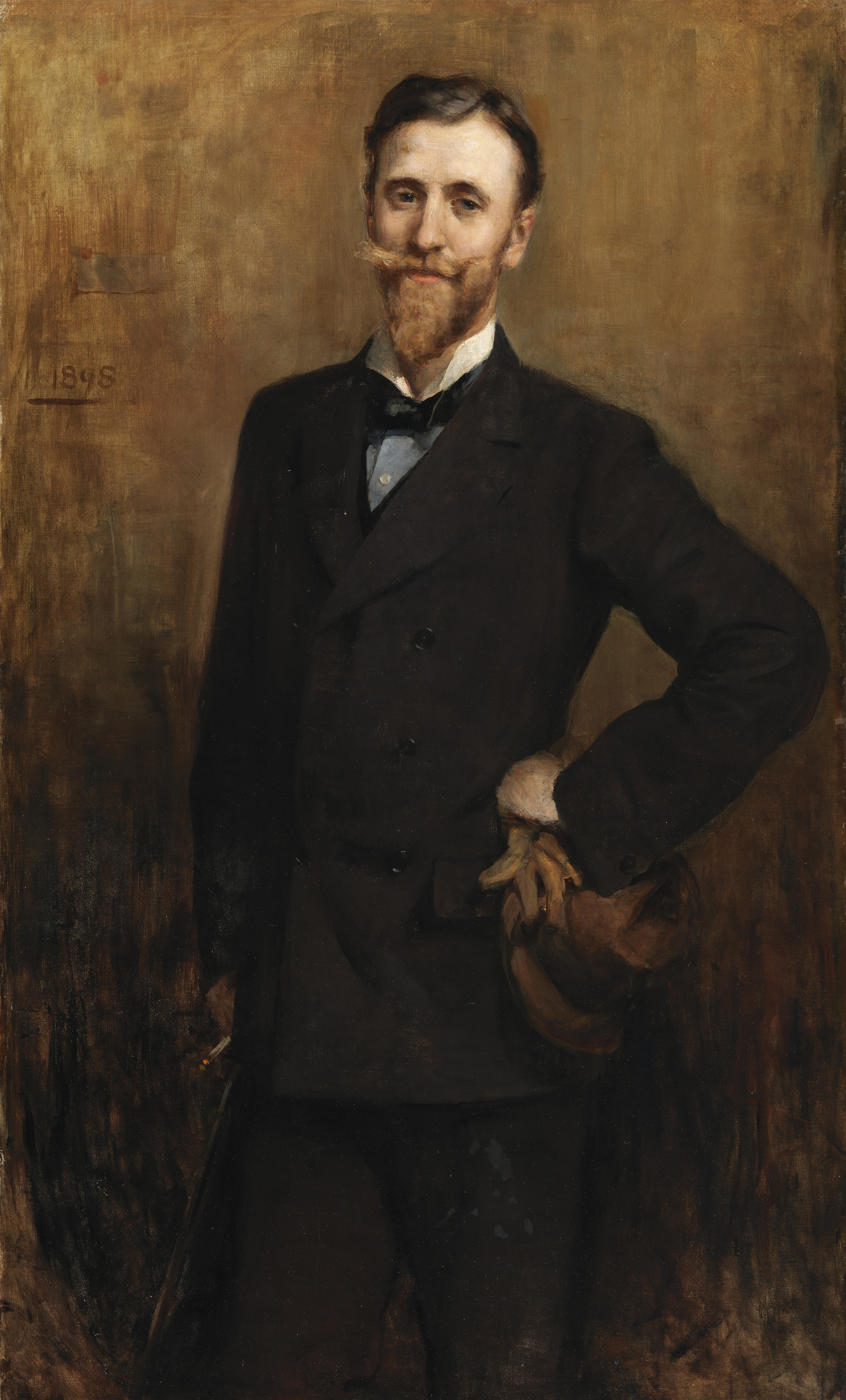

Member of Parliament for South Louth
- In office 1885–1892
- Preceded by: New constituency
- Succeeded by: Daniel Ambrose

Personal details
- Born: 25 October 1858
- Died: 19 January 1931 (aged 72)

Thomas Patrick Gill (25 Oct 1858 – 19 January 1931) was a journalist and politician. A member of the Irish Parliamentary Party in the late 19th and early 20th century, he was also a Member of Parliament in the British House of Commons representing the South Louth constituency unopposed from 1885 to 1892.

== Life ==
Gill was born 25 October 1858, in Ballygraigue, Nenagh, County Tipperary, the eldest son of Robert Gill, a civil engineer. He was educated at Trinity College Dublin and became a journalist, firstly as editor of the Catholic World magazine of New York, and an associate editor of the North American Review, 1883–85. In 1882, he married Annie Fennell of Dublin, they had three children. His uncle Peter Gill had unsuccessfully contested the County Tipperary constituency.

Gill was a friend and political ally of Charles Stewart Parnell. After the death of Parnell he remained with the Irish Parliamentary Party. He worked with Horace Plunkett in developing the Irish co-operative movement. He was member and honorary secretary to the 1895 Recess Committee which led to the formation of both the Department of Agriculture and Technical Instruction for Ireland (DATI), and the Vocational Education Committees (VEC). Gill's key work for the Recess committee was research into the state aid to agriculture in France and Denmark. In February 1900, he was appointed Secretary of the new Department of Agriculture and Technical Instruction for Ireland. In 1907, Gill was appointed Chairman of the Departmental Committee on Irish Forestry. He also served on a number of governmental committees concerning agriculture and agricultural production. He was President of the Irish Technical Instruction Association from 1925 to 1929.

Gill was an uncle of former Workers' Party president and Dublin West TD Tomás Mac Giolla.

Parliament of the United Kingdom
New constituency	Member of Parliament for South Louth; 1885 – 1892	Succeeded by Daniel Ambrose
