= Alexander Martin Sullivan =

Irish Nationalist politician, lawyer and journalist (1829–1884)

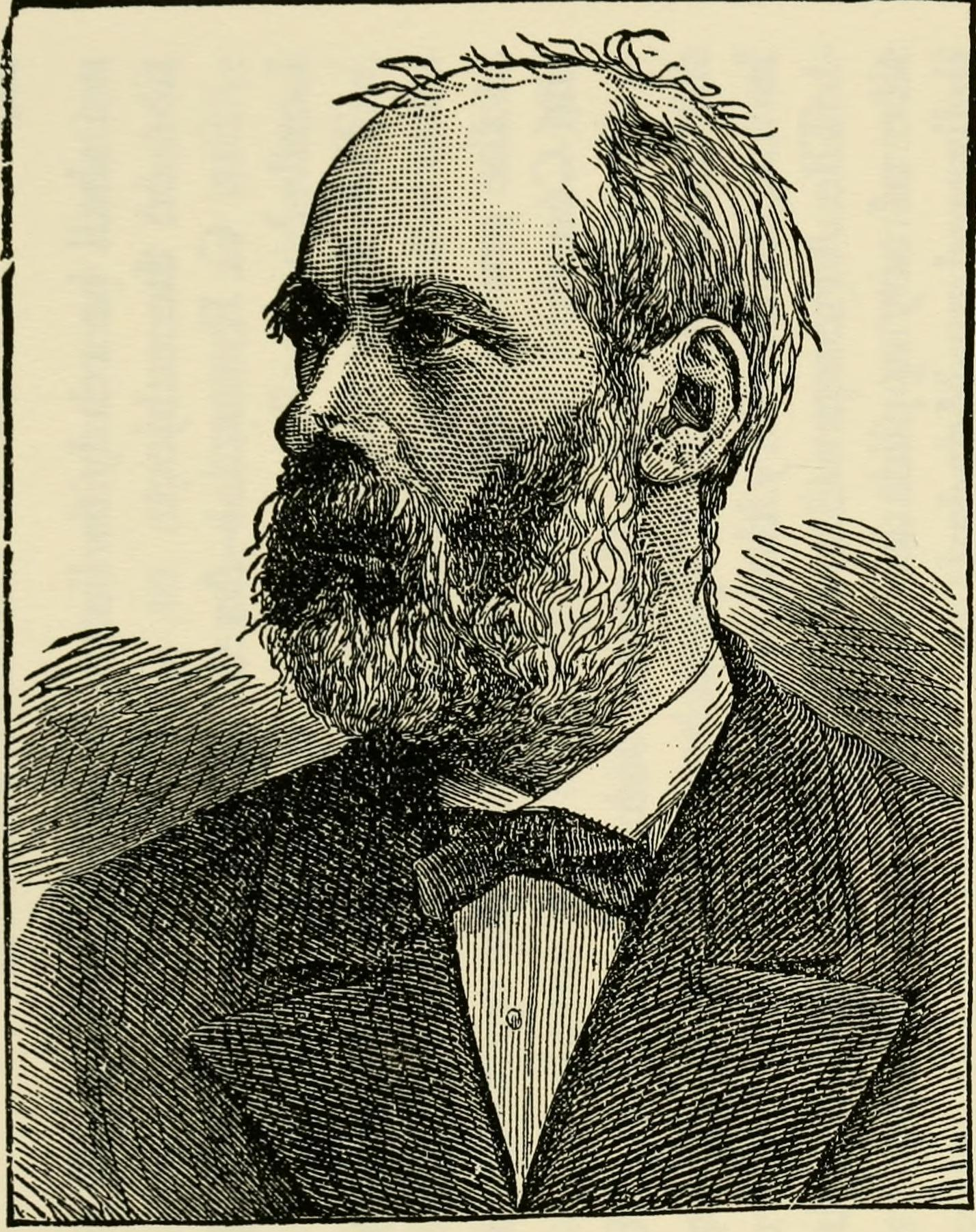
Alexander Martin Sullivan

Alexander Martin Sullivan (1829 – 17 October 1884) was an Irish nationalist politician, barrister, and journalist from Bantry, County Cork.

== Biography ==
Alexander Martin Sullivan, the second son of Daniel Sullivan of Dublin, was born in 1829 (A popular date for Sullivan's birth appears in many histories as 1830, but his grave stone reads 1829) at Bantry, County Cork, the second of six sons. He was educated in the local national school. One of Sullivan's brothers was Timothy Daniel Sullivan, the Lord Mayor of Dublin from 1886 to 1888.

During the Great Famine of 1845 to 1847, Sullivan was employed as a clerk in connection with the relief works started by the government. Deeply influenced by the distress he then witnessed, he afterwards joined the Confederate Club formed at Bantry in support of the revolutionary movement of the Young Irelanders, and was the organiser of the enthusiastic reception given by the town to William Smith O'Brien in July 1848 during the insurgent leader's tour of the southern counties. Early in 1853, Sullivan went to Dublin to seek employment as an artist. An exhibition of the arts and industries of Ireland was held in Dublin that year, and he was engaged to supply pencil sketches to the Dublin Expositor, a journal issued in connection with the exhibition. Subsequently, he obtained a post as a draughtsman in the Irish valuation office, and afterwards as a reporter on the Liverpool Daily Post.

In 1850, Sullivan became assistant-editor of The Nation in 1855, and subsequently editor and proprietor. From 1861 to 1884, in conjunction with his elder brother, T. D. Sullivan, he made The Nation one of the most potent factors in the Irish Nationalist cause, and also issued the Weekly News and Zozimus. Called to the Irish bar in 1876, he was a 'special call' of the Inner Temple in 1877, and was made QC in 1881. He mainly practiced at the English bar, though he acted in some political cases in Ireland.

At the 1874 general election he was elected as member of parliament (MP) for Louth, but although he did not formally resign, he did not take his seat. At the general election in April 1880, Sullivan was again returned for Louth, but this time formally resigned from the Commons on 18 May 1880. However, Charles Stewart Parnell had been elected for both Cork City and for County Meath, and chose to sit for Cork. At the resulting by-election on 20 May 1880, Sullivan was returned unopposed to fill the vacancy in Meath, and held that seat until his resignation on 3 February 1882. He then concentrated on his work at the parliamentary bar.

As a member of the Dublin Corporation, he secured a magnificent site for the Grattan Monument (to Henry Grattan), towards which he donated £400, the amount of a subscription by his admirers while he was undergoing imprisonment for a political offence in 1868. This monument was formally unveiled in January 1876. Between 1878 and 1882 he was engaged in many notable trials. His last great case was on 30 November 1883 when he was a colleague of Lord Russell in the defence of Patrick O'Donnell for the murder of James Carey, an informer. He was buried at Glasnevin Cemetery. In addition to his labours, Alexander Sullivan was a great temperance reformer. He also wrote two notable books, The Story of Ireland and New Ireland and contributed many sketches (including some verse) to Irish Penny Readings (1879–85). He died at Dartry Lodge, Rathmines, Dublin on 17 October 1884.

== Family ==
Sullivan married Frances Genevieve Donovan and had several children. His second son and namesake, Alexander, was a leading barrister, the last to hold the rank of Serjeant-at-law (Ireland). He is remembered chiefly for his unsuccessful defence of Roger Casement on charges of treason.

== Notes ==
Parliament of the United Kingdom
Preceded by Matthew O'Reilly Dease and Chichester Fortescue	Member of Parliament for County Louth; 1874–1880; With: Philip Callan to April 1874; George Kirk April 1874 – April 1880; Philip Callan from April 1880	Succeeded by Alan Henry Bellingham and Philip Callan
Preceded by Charles Stewart Parnell and Robert Henry Metge	Member of Parliament for County Meath; 1880–1882; With: Robert Henry Metge	Succeeded by Michael Davitt and Robert Henry Metge
