= John Leslie Foster =

Irish barrister, judge and Tory Member of Parliament

John Leslie Foster, FRS (c. 1781 – 10 July 1842) was an Irish barrister, judge and Tory Member of Parliament (MP) in the United Kingdom Parliament. In 1830 he was appointed a Baron of the Court of Exchequer of Ireland.

He was the son of William Foster, Bishop of Clogher (1744–1797) and nephew of John Foster, 1st Baron Oriel. He was educated at Trinity College Dublin and St John's College, Cambridge.

== Early life ==
After his father's death while he was about sixteen, his uncle, John Foster, oversaw his further education, encouraged him to travel and employed him (presumably part-time) as his private secretary (in an office for the loss of which he was later compensated on the Union with Great Britain with an annuity of £10 5s).
Taking advantage of a respite in hostilities between Britain and France thanks to the Treaty of Amiens, he visited Paris in April 1802 where he attended a levée, was presented to Napoleon and noted that the splendour of the court of the Tuileries was "much greater than ever was the old court of France".
His travels continued later that year when he set out in July on a tour of Europe encompassing Switzerland, Italy, Austria, Prussia, the Black Sea and Constantinople before returning to Dublin in September 1803.

== Family ==
On 9 August 1814 he married Letitia Vesey-Fitzgerald, daughter of James Fitzgerald, with whom he had five sons and a daughter, including the Australian politician, John Foster Vesey-Fitzgerald.

In the summer of 1814 he acquired his family seat at Rathescar, Co. Louth, an estate where his uncle, John Foster had lived in the 1770s and where John Leslie Foster undertook substantial repairs and alterations.

== Career ==
John Leslie Foster was called to the Bar in Ireland in 1803 and was sometime a member of Lincoln's Inn. In 1804 he published an Essay on the Principles of Commercial Exchanges, particularly between England and Ireland.
He was one of the commissioners appointed in September 1809 to the Commission for Improving the Bogs of Ireland.

Between 1807 and 1812 he represented Dublin University, having first contested the seat in 1806. He returned to the bar in 1812, but in 1816 was brought back to Parliament at the instigation of the government as member for Sir Leonard Holmes's borough of Yarmouth on the Isle of Wight.

At the 1818 general election, he was elected for both Lisburn and Armagh City. He chose to sit for the latter constituency and served from 1818 to 1820.

From April 1818 until its abolition in 1826, he was Counsel to the Commissioners of the Irish Board of Customs and Excise. Between 1824 and 1830 he was the MP for County Louth, and from 1825 was a director of the Drogheda Steam Packet Company. He also acted as Mayor of Drogheda during this period.

On 24 June 1824, he was appointed to the Royal Commission for inquiring into the nature and extent of the Instruction afforded by the several Institutions in Ireland established for the purpose of Education where he served with the other Commissioners: Thomas Frankland Lewis, William Grant, James Glassford and Anthony Richard Blake. In this office Foster is reported by the Roman Catholic politician and barrister, Richard Lalor Sheil, to have taken the part of “a knight-errant against popery” whose “object was to bring out whatever was unfavourable to the Catholic Priesthood; while [his fellow Commissioner] Mr Blake (himself a Roman Catholic) justly endeavored to rectify the misconstructions of his brother inquirer”.

== Co. Louth Election – 1826 ==
At the Co. Louth Election in August 1826 John Leslie Foster was knocked down to second place in the two-seat constituency by Alexander Dawson, a candidate put up by O’Connell's ascendant Catholic Association. After the turbulent election John Leslie complained to his sister that: ‘the priests attacked me in all their Chapels … they made it distinctly a matter of Eternal Damnation to vote for me & an atonement for Sin to vote against me’. The Catholic Association had already gained success in Co. Waterford and this election was a precursor to their further success two years later in County Clare.

== Catholic Emancipation ==
Although John Leslie Foster was (as he assured the House of Commons in February 1829) ‘no Orangeman’, he was a persistent opponent to Catholic Emancipation. His speech opposing Henry Grattan's 1812 Catholic Relief Bill was published as a pamphlet in 1817. However, following the election of O’Connell as MP for County Clare in July 1828, it became clear to Peel and the government that continued opposition was unsustainable. Foster was eventually brought round to support the Emancipation Bill once proper safeguards had been offered.

On 25 January 1829, Lord Ellenborough, Henry Goulburn, J. C. Herries, William Vesey-Fitzgerald, Lord Lyndhurst, Lord Francis Leveson-Gower, John Henry North, John Leslie Foster, John Doherty and George Dawson (Peel's brother-in-law) met at Peel's to discuss the matter. If Emancipation was to be granted, a concession was needed and the Forty-Shilling Freeholders' Bill was brought forward. Lord Ellenborough recorded that ‘Peel told us he had seen [John] Leslie Foster who was for a settlement, but strongly against paying the Roman Catholic clergy. He will therefore support the [Roman Catholic Relief] Bill. … Foster [is] consulting with the cabinet how Catholic emancipation may best be brought about!’

On 30 March 1829, when the 1829 Roman Catholic Relief Bill received the Royal Assent, Foster's concession, the Forty Shilling Freeholders’ Bill was also approved. This Bill, which raised the franchise qualification to ten pounds, was the ‘security’ that John Leslie Foster with two of his brothers-in-law, John Henry North and William Vesey Fitzgerald, had helped to frame and was intended to prevent ‘the freeholder from being the tool of the landlord, or the slave of the priest’.

== Court of Exchequer of Ireland ==
Foster did not stand at the 1830 general election as it had long been agreed by Peel and Leveson-Gower that, following the abolition of his post as Counsel to the Revenue in January 1828, his claims to promotion were ‘very much superior’ to any others and, following his retirement from politics, John Leslie Foster was appointed as a Baron of the Court of Exchequer of Ireland on 16 July 1830. He later moved to the Court of Common Pleas and died while on circuit at Cavan on 10 July 1842.

He served as Treasurer of King's Inns from 1832 to 1833 and from 1838 to 1839.

Parliament of the United Kingdom
Preceded by George Knox	Member of Parliament for Dublin University; 1807–1812	Succeeded by William Plunket
Preceded by Richard Wellesley and Sir Henry Montgomery, Bt	Member of Parliament for Yarmouth; 1816–1818; With: Richard Wellesley to 1817; Alexander Maconochie 1817–1818; John Copley 1818	Succeeded by William Mount and John Taylor
Preceded by Daniel Webb Webber	Member of Parliament for Armagh City; 1818 – 1820	Succeeded by William Stuart
Preceded by Thomas Skeffington and John Jocelyn	Member of Parliament for County Louth; 1824–1830; With: John Jocelyn to 1826; Alexander Dawson from 1826	Succeeded by John McClintock and Alexander Dawson
