= Drumcar House =

Irish manor house

- Location within Ireland

General information
- Type: Historic house
- Architectural style: Georgian
- Location: Near Drumcar, Ardee, Dunleer, County Louth, Leinster, Ireland
- Coordinates: 53°51′44.5″N 6°22′49.1″W
- Owner: McClintock family

Drumcar House (later: St. Mary's Hospital; currently: Saint John of God Residence) is a manor house in the historical parish of Drumcar in the barony of Ardee, 1 mile (1.6 km) northeast of Dunleer, County Louth, Leinster, Ireland. The house was built in 1777. It was home to the McClintock family from then to the 1940s, stemming from Alexander McClintock (1692–1775). One of its best known owners was John McClintock (1770–1855), a magistrate for County Louth, and formerly Serjeant at Arms in the Irish House of Commons, who was known to be occupying the estate in 1805 and until his death. The house was sold in about 1903 by The 2nd Baron Rathdonnell to his cousin, Frank McClintock (1853–1924), Rector of Drumcar and Dean of Armagh.

In 1948, it became St. Mary's Hospital, a colony for the mentally ill. Still later, it was converted to Saint John of God Residence, a hospital/infirmary.

Drumcar House is listed in the Record of Protected Structures maintained by Louth County Council.

== Architecture and fittings ==
John McClintock (1770–1855), one of the former owners of Drumcar House

The white Georgian mansion was originally large and rectangular, three storeys over a basement. It was two rooms deep split by a large central hall. A shallow hipped roof was hidden behind a cornice. There was a blocking course that included chimneystacks. The entrance front had five bay windows. The original building had a simple tripartite doorcase that was set in a shallow relieving arch, as well as single-storey walls with built-in niches and sunken panels. These joined the main block and included a pedimented carriage arch on each side. It was described in A Topographical Dictionary of Ireland, published by Samuel Lewis in 1837, as "the seat of J. McClintock, Esq., an elegant mansion, beautifully situated in an extensive and richly wooded demesne, commanding a fine view of the Carlingford and Mourne mountains and the sea". The view extends to Dundalk Bay.

A mid-19th century expansion included a four-columned Doric porch and balcony. Also moulded window surrounds and changes to the ground-floor windows occurred at this time. A later expansion added two-storey, three-bay wings. Another renovation added Mansard roofs.

The interior was entirely remodelled by Kelly & Jones when Drumcar House became St. Mary's Hospital, a colony for the mentally ill, in 1948. The conversion and extension cost approximately £360,000.

A plaque on the portico commemorates 50 years of residence by Saint John of God brothers.

The grounds are large and there are a number of single-storey buildings for accommodation and clinics.
