= Bellingham baronets =

Set index for Bellingham baronets

There have been three baronetcies created for persons with the surname Bellingham, one in the Baronetage of England, one in the Baronetage of Ireland and one in the Baronetage of Great Britain. As of 2026 one creation is extant. The surname is pronounced "Bellinjum"

- Bellingham baronets of Hilsington (1620)
- Bellingham baronets of Dubber (1667)
- Bellingham baronets of Castle Bellingham (1796)
