= George Kirk (MP) =

George Kirk MP

Member of Parliament for County Louth
- In office 9 April 1874 – 31 March 1880 Serving with Alexander Martin Sullivan
- Preceded by: Alexander Martin Sullivan; Philip Callan
- Succeeded by: Alexander Martin Sullivan; Philip Callan

Personal details
- Born: 1831
- Died: 13 March 1912 (aged 80)
- Party: Home Rule League

George Harley Kirk (1831 – 13 March 1912) was an Irish Home Rule League politician.

He was elected a Member of Parliament (MP) for County Louth at a by-election in 1874 but was defeated at the next general election in 1880.

Parliament of the United Kingdom
Preceded by Alexander Martin Sullivan; Philip Callan	Member of Parliament for County Louth; 1874 – 1880; With: Alexander Martin Sullivan	Succeeded by Alexander Martin Sullivan; Philip Callan
