= Tristram Kennedy =

Irish Liberal, Whig and Independent Irish Party politician, and lawyer

Tristram Kennedy MP

Member of Parliament for County Louth
- In office 15 April 1865 – 24 November 1868 Serving with Chichester Parkinson-Fortescue
- Preceded by: Richard Bellew; Chichester Parkinson-Fortescue
- Succeeded by: Chichester Parkinson-Fortescue; Matthew Dease
- In office 22 July 1852 – 10 April 1857 Serving with Chichester Fortescue
- Preceded by: Richard Bellew; Chichester Fortescue
- Succeeded by: Chichester Fortescue; John McClintock

Personal details
- Born: 27 June 1805 Inishowen, County Donegal, Ireland
- Died: 20 November 1885 (aged 80) Weston-super-Mare, Somerset, England
- Resting place: Cossington, Somerset, England
- Party: Liberal
- Other political affiliations: Independent Irish Party (July 1852–1859); Whig (until July 1852)
- Spouse: Sarah Graham (m. 1862)
- Children: Seven
- Parent(s): John Pitt Kennedy; Mary Cary

Tristram Edward Kennedy (27 June 1805 – 20 November 1885) was an Irish Liberal, Whig and Independent Irish Party politician, and lawyer.

== Family ==
Born at Inishowen, County Donegal, Kennedy was the twelfth child of Church of Ireland clergyman John Pitt Kennedy and Mary Cary, daughter of Thomas Cary. In 1862, he married Sarah Helen Margaret Graham, daughter of George Templar Graham and Frances Margaret Golightly, and together they had seven children:

- Horace Graham Kennedy (born 1863)
- George Portalés (died as an infant)
- Tristram Edward Whiteside Kennedy (born 1866)
- Pitt Shadwell Portalés Kennedy (1868–1911)
- Francis Malcolm Evory Kennedy (born 1869), an officer in the Worcestershire Regiment
- Theodora (died as an infant)
- Caroline Mary Dorothea Kennedy (born 1880)

== Legal career ==
He was educated at Derry Free Grammar School, becoming an attorney and then, in 1828, High Sheriff of Londonderry City. In that role, he chaired a lengthy and controversial debate between Protestant and Catholic clergyman, winning admiration from both sides. However, in 1829, he was struck off the roll of attorneys, and entered Lincoln's Inn and King's Inns in Dublin, before being called to the bar of Ireland in 1834, aiming to improve legal education standards.

In doing this, he opened the Dublin Law Institute in 1839, starting the education of a subject not taught systematically in Ireland for at least 200 years. This campaign to reform legal education was widely supported, and helped by Waterford City MP Thomas Wyse. It was also said to stimulate the academic study of English law at British and Irish universities, sped up the introduction of qualifications, and pointed out ideological rationale at the time that attorneys must attend English law inns before being able to practice on the Irish Bar.

In 1846, the House of Commons select committee on legal education, chaired by Wyse, produced a report on legal education, influencing the future of both English and Irish legal education.

However, this law school entered troubled times and collapsed in 1845, leading to Kennedy shortly after ending his legal career and becoming a land agent on the 13,500-tenant Bath estates in County Monaghan, where he "sternly refused to adopt any of the cruel remedies applied in other quarters" during the Great Famine, and allowed tenants to run great arrears. Fewer than one in four tenants were able to read and write, leading Kennedy to establish seven new national schools. This work, and his initiation of the Carrickmacross lace industry, is largely credited to his later election to Parliament.

== Political career ==
He was elected MP for County Louth as a Whig candidate in 1852 before joining the Independent Irish Party just after the election. Whilst in Parliament, he contributed primarily to debates on landlord and tenant matters, or national and industrial education. Standing in this capacity in 1857, he lost the seat. At the 1859 general election, he stood as a Liberal for King's County, but ended at the bottom of the poll.

He was re-elected as a Liberal candidate at a by-election in 1865 and held the seat until he stood down in 1868, after a sectarian campaign waged by Matthew Dease, the successful Liberal candidate. In 1874, Kennedy stood for election in County Donegal, but was unsuccessful.

== Later life ==
Kennedy was also a member of the Dublin Social and Statistical Inquiry Society, visiting Belgium to inspect responses to poverty in that country and then, in 1855 with W. K. Sullivan, publishing a booklet on industrial training. He later, in 1877 and 1878, published two tracts on the reform of law and legal education.

Kennedy died in 1885 at his home, Charleville, The Shrubbery, Weston-super-Mare, Somerset and was buried at Cossington village church.

Parliament of the United Kingdom
Preceded by Richard Bellew; Chichester Parkinson-Fortescue	Member of Parliament for County Louth; 1865 – 1868; With: Chichester Parkinson-Fortescue	Succeeded by Chichester Parkinson-Fortescue; Matthew Dease
Preceded by Richard Bellew; Chichester Fortescue	Member of Parliament for County Louth; 1852 – 1857; With: Chichester Fortescue	Succeeded by Chichester Fortescue; John McClintock
