= Thomas McClintock-Bunbury, 2nd Baron Rathdonnell =

Anglo-Irish peer, British Army officer and politician

Thomas Kane McClintock-Bunbury, 2nd Baron Rathdonnell (29 November 1848 – 22 May 1929), was an Anglo-Irish peer, British Army officer and politician.

== Biography ==
He was the son of Captain William Bunbury McClintock-Bunbury and Pauline Caroline Diana Mary Stronge. He was educated at Eton College. He gained a commission in the Leicestershire Yeomanry, and later transferred to regular service in the Royal Scots Greys. In 1876 he served as High Sheriff of Carlow.

Upon the death of his uncle, John McClintock, 1st Baron Rathdonnell, on 17 May 1879, McClintock-Bunbury succeeded to his title by special remainder. He served as a Deputy Lieutenant for County Louth. On 8 April 1889 he was elected as an Irish representative peer and took his seat in the British House of Lords. On 26 February 1890 he became Lord Lieutenant of Carlow, a position he held until 1922. In 1896 he was made the Honorary Colonel of the 6th Battalion, Royal Irish Rifles. Between 1918 and his death he was President of the Royal Dublin Society.

In 1921 Lord Rathdonnell was appointed to the Senate of Southern Ireland in his capacity as a peer. He attended the three meetings of the Senate prior to its dissolution in 1922.

He married Katharine Anne Bruen, daughter of Henry Bruen and Mary Margaret Conolly, on 26 February 1874. Their eldest son, William McClintock Bunbury (1878–1900) was an officer in the Royal Scots Greys and died on active service during the Second Boer War in South Africa. He was therefore succeeded in his title by his second son, Thomas.

== Arms ==
Coat of arms of Thomas McClintock-Bunbury, 2nd Baron Rathdonnell
Crest A lion passant Proper. Escutcheon Per pale Gules and Azure a chevron Ermine between three escallop shells Argent. Supporters Dexter a lion and sinister a leopard both Proper each gorged with a collar Ermine and each charged on the shoulder with an escallop Argent. Motto Virtute Et Labore

Political offices
Preceded by The Lord Dunsany	Representative peer for Ireland; 1889–1929	Succeeded by Office lapsed
Honorary titles
Preceded by Arthur MacMurrough Kavanagh	Lord Lieutenant of Carlow; 1890–1922	Succeeded by Office lapsed
Peerage of Ireland
Preceded by John McClintock	Baron Rathdonnell; 1879–1929	Succeeded by Thomas McClintock-Bunbury
