= Richard Bellew =

Irish politician

Richard Montesquieu Bellew (12 February 1803 – 8 January 1880) was an Irish politician. He was educated at Trinity College, Dublin. He took office as a Junior Lord of the Treasury in Lord John Russell's first government on the death of Denis O'Conor.

Parliament of the United Kingdom
Preceded by Richard Lalor Sheil; Sir Patrick Bellew, Bt	Member of Parliament for Louth; 1832 – 1852; With: Thomas FitzGerald 1832–1834; Sir Patrick Bellew, Bt 1834–1837; Henry Chester 1837–1840; Thomas Fortescue 1840–1841; Thomas Vesey Dawson 1841–1847; Chichester Parkinson-Fortescue from 1847	Succeeded by Tristram Kennedy; Chichester Parkinson-Fortescue
Preceded by Chichester Parkinson-Fortescue and John McClintock	Member of Parliament for Louth; 1859 – 1865; With: Chichester Parkinson-Fortescue	Succeeded by Chichester Parkinson-Fortescue and Tristram Kennedy
Political offices
Preceded by Denis O'Conor	Junior Lord of the Treasury; 1847 – 1852	Succeeded by Marquess of Chandos; The Lord Henry Lennox; Thomas Bateson
