= Bellingham baronets of Hilsington (1620) =

Escutcheon of the Bellingham baronets of Hilsington

The Bellingham baronetcy, of Hilsington in the County of Westmorland, was created in the Baronetage of England on 30 May 1620 for Henry Bellingham, Member of Parliament for Westmorland. He was from 1625 four times elected to Westminster, sitting in the Short Parliament and Long Parliament. A Royalist from 1642, he sat also in the Oxford Parliament called by Charles.

He was succeeded by his son, the 2nd Baronet, who also sat as Member of Parliament for Westmorland, in the Long Parliament from 1646 to 1648. On his death in 1650, a matter of days after his father, the baronetcy became extinct.

== Bellingham baronets, of Hilsington (1620) ==
- Sir Henry Bellingham, 1st Baronet (died 1650)
- Sir James Bellingham, 2nd Baronet (1623–1650), left no heir.
