= Sir Edward Bellingham, 5th Baronet =

Anglo-Irish soldier and politician (1879–1956)

Brigadier-General Sir Edward Bellingham Bt CMG DSO DL
- Bellingham in 1922

Senator
- In office 17 September 1925 – 29 May 1936

Personal details
- Born: 26 January 1879
- Died: 19 May 1956 (aged 77)
- Party: Independent
- Spouse: Charlotte Gough (m. 1904)
- Children: 1
- Parent: Henry Bellingham (father)
- Education: Royal Military College, Sandhurst

Military service
- Allegiance: United Kingdom
- Branch/service: British Army; Royal Air Force
- Rank: Brigadier-General
- Unit: Royal Scots
- Battles/wars: Second Boer War; First World War; Second World War
- Awards: Companion of the Order of St Michael and St George; Distinguished Service Order; Mentioned in Despatches (3)

Sir Edward Henry Charles Patrick Bellingham, 5th Baronet, CMG, DSO, DL (26 January 1879 – 19 May 1956) was an Anglo-Irish British Army officer, politician, and diplomat.

== Background and education ==
Bellingham was the eldest son of Sir Henry Bellingham, 4th Baronet and his wife, Lady Constance Noel, the second daughter of Charles Noel, 2nd Earl of Gainsborough. He was educated at The Oratory School and went then to the Royal Military College, Sandhurst. In 1921, he succeeded his father as baronet.

== Career ==
Bellingham was commissioned into the Royal Scots regiment as a second lieutenant on 23 August 1899. He fought with his regiment in the Second Boer War and was wounded.. For his service in South Africa he was awarded the Queen's South Africa Medal and the King's South Africa Medal with three clasps. During the First World War, Bellingham was wounded and mentioned in despatches three times. He was awarded the Distinguished Service Order in 1916 and promoted to Major in 1917, while serving as temporary Brigadier-General, having been appointed to command 118th Brigade on 3 February. He commanded the brigade during the Third Battle of Ypres in July–November that year. In the 1918 New Year Honours, he was appointed a Companion of the Order of St Michael and St George. He and his Brigade major were taken prisoner on 28 March 1918 while commanding a rearguard during the confusion of the 'Great Retreat'. After the Armistice he was promoted to Brevet Lieutenant-Colonel. He retired in 1922.

Resident at Castlebellingham, County Louth, Bellingham was appointed Lord Lieutenant of Louth in 1921, a post he held for only one year until the establishment of the Irish Free State. In 1925, he was elected to the Free State Seanad Éireann with the ninth highest number of first preference votes nationwide of the 76 candidates, and he sat there until its abolition in 1936.

With the outbreak of the Second World War, Bellingham joined the Royal Air Force. He was appointed as a Flying Officer in 1941 and later was a Squadron Leader in the RAF Regiment. After the war he served in the Commission of Control in Germany until 1947. In his last years he was vice-consul at the British embassy in Guatemala.

== Personal life ==
Bellingham was a breeder of pedigree pigs and Aberdeen Angus cattle. On 11 June 1904, he married Charlotte Elizabeth; she was the daughter of Alfred Payne and widow of Frederick Gough. They had an only daughter. Bellingham died in 1956 and was survived by his wife, who died in 1964. He was succeeded in the baronetcy by his nephew, Roger.

== Notes ==
Honorary titles
| Preceded by Sir Henry Bellingham, Bt | Lord Lieutenant of Louth; 1921–1922 | Office abolished |
Baronetage of Great Britain
| Preceded by Sir Henry Bellingham, Bt | Baronet (of Castle Bellingham); 1921–1956 | Succeeded by Roger Bellingham |
