= George Bellew-Bryan, 4th Baron Bellew =

Irish politician

The Right Honourable George Bellew-Bryan 4th Baron Bellew
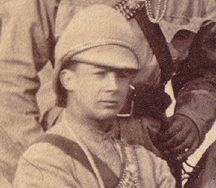
- George Bellew-Bryan, 4th Baron Bellew, 1879

Baron Bellew
- In office 1911–1935
- Preceded by: Charles Bellew, 3rd Baron Bellew
- Succeeded by: Edward Bellew, 5th Baron Bellew

Lord Lieutenant of Louth
- In office 1898–1911

Representative peer for Ireland
- In office 1914–1935

Personal details
- Born: George Leopold Bryan; January 22, 1857
- Died: January 26, 1935 (aged 78)
- Spouse: Elaine Carlisle Leach
- Profession: Soldier, Peer

Military service
- Allegiance: United Kingdom
- Branch/service: British Army
- Rank: Major
- Unit: 10th Royal Hussars
- Battles/wars: Second Anglo-Afghan War, Nile Expedition, Second Boer War, World War I

George Bellew-Bryan, 4th Baron Bellew (1857–1935) was an Irish peer, the son of Edward Joseph Bellew, 2nd Baron Bellew.

== Biography ==
He was born on 22 January 1857.

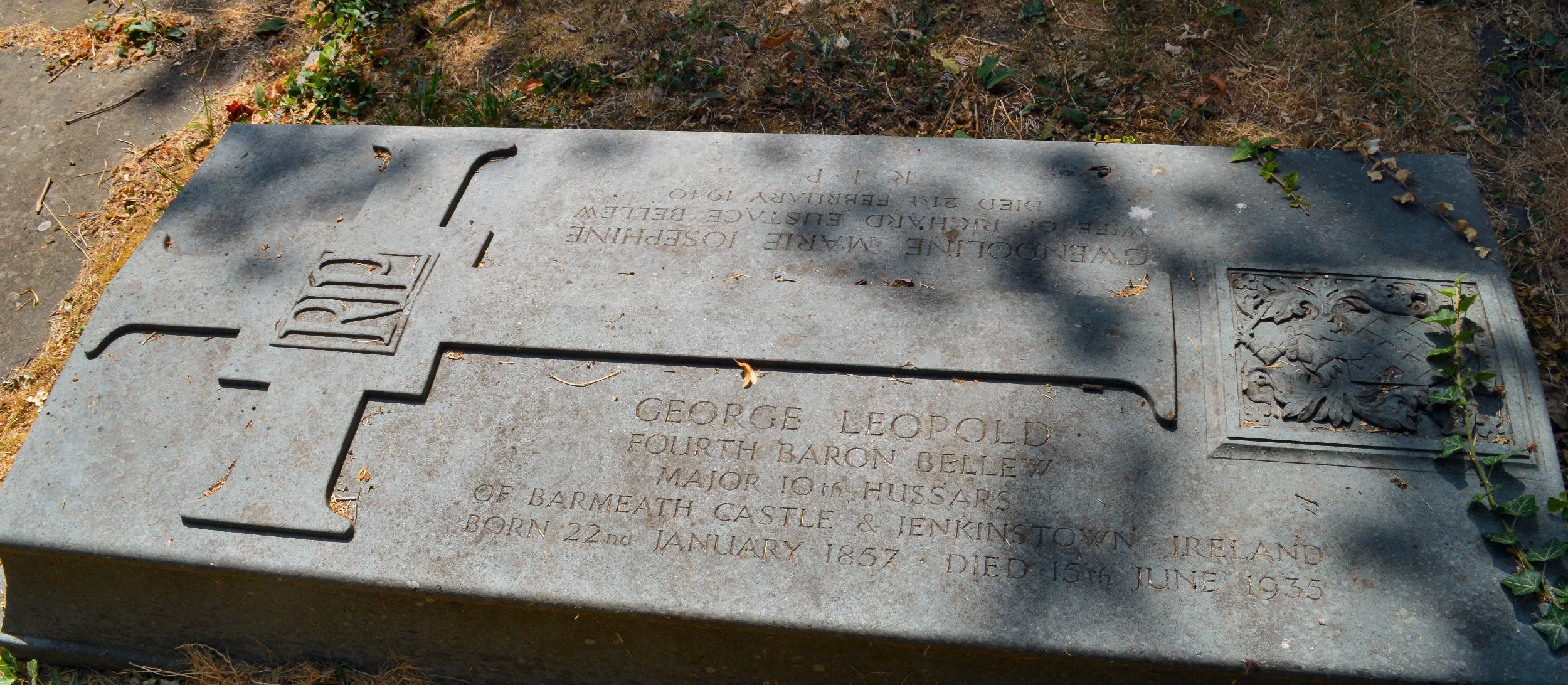
St Mary Magdalen, Mortlake

He fought in the Second Anglo-Afghan War from 1878 to 1879. From 1884 to 1885, he fought in the Nile Expedition. He was appointed 2nd in command of the 5th Battalion, Imperial Yeomanry on 3 February 1900, and fought in the Second Boer War from 1900 to 1901. He became a lieutenant, then a major in the 10th Royal Hussars. He later fought in the First World War.

From 1898 to 1911, he served as Lord Lieutenant of Louth in Ireland. In 1911, he became the 4th Baron Bellew, and was elected to sit as an Irish representative peer in the House of Lords.

In 1899, he played in the first international polo match between England and Australia in Melbourne alongside Thomas Brand, 3rd Viscount Hampden.

He married Elaine Carlisle Leach, daughter of John Benjamin Leach, on 9 April 1927. She later became known as Elaine Lady Bellew and served as a City Councillor on the Kilkenny Corporation. He is buried at St Mary Magdalen, Mortlake.

Peerage of Ireland
Preceded by Charles Bellew	Baron Bellew; 1911–1935	Succeeded by Edward Bellew
Political offices
Preceded by The Lord Ventry	Representative peer for Ireland; 1914–1935	Office lapsed
