= Lord Lieutenant of Louth =

Ceremonial officer in Louth, Ireland

This is a list of people who have served as Lord Lieutenant of Louth.

There were lieutenants of counties in Ireland until the reign of James II, when they were renamed governors. The office of Lord Lieutenant was recreated on 23 August 1831.

== Governors ==
- Oliver Plunkett, 6th Baron Louth (died 1679)
- Matthew Plunkett, 7th Baron Louth: 1687–1689
- Viscount Limerick: 1756–1758
- James Hamilton, 2nd Earl of Clanbrassil: 1769–1798 (died 1798)
- John Foster, 1st Baron Oriel 1798–1828
- Thomas Skeffington, 2nd Viscount Ferrard 1805–1831 (jointly until 1828)

== Lord Lieutenants ==
- Patrick Bellew, 1st Baron Bellew 9 December 1831 – 10 December 1866
- John McClintock, 1st Baron Rathdonnell 14 January 1867 – 17 April 1879
- Clotworthy Skeffington, 11th Viscount Massereene 13 November 1879 – March 1898
- George Bellew-Bryan, 4th Baron Bellew 14 March 1898 – 15 July 1911
- Sir Alan Bellingham, 4th Baronet 4 November 1911 – 9 June 1921
- Sir Edward Bellingham, 5th Baronet 22 July 1921 – 1922
