= County Louth (UK Parliament constituency) =

Former parliamentary constituency in the United Kingdom

- Former county constituency for the House of Commons
- County: County Louth

1801–1885
- Seats: 2
- Created from: Louth County
- Replaced by: North Louth; South Louth

1918–1922
- Seats: 1
- Created from: North Louth; South Louth
- Replaced by: Louth–Meath

County Louth is a former parliamentary constituency in Ireland, which was represented in the House of Commons of the Parliament of the United Kingdom. It returned two Members of Parliament (MPs) from 1801 to 1885, and one MP from 1918 to 1922.

== History ==
From 1801 to 1885, the constituency comprised County Louth, except for the parliamentary boroughs of Drogheda and Dundalk. It succeeded the constituency of County Louth in the Irish House of Commons. Between 1885 and 1918 the county was divided into the county divisions of North Louth and South Louth. In 1918, the reunited constituency covered the entire county of Louth plus a small part of County Meath near Drogheda.

At the 1918 general election, Sinn Féin won by 255 votes, its narrowest margin of victory in that election. John J. O'Kelly, a native of County Kerry, resident in Glasnevin, Dublin, was Louth's first TD. The constituency was merged with Meath to form the 5-seat Louth–Meath constituency for the 2nd and 3rd Dála.

== Members of Parliament ==
=== MPs 1801–85 ===
Election	1st Member	1st Party	2nd Member	2nd Party
1801, 1 January	John Foster		William Fortescue	
1806, 18 November	John Foster	Tory	Richard Jocelyn	Tory
1807, 19 May	John Foster	Tory	John Jocelyn	
1810, 10 February	John Foster	Tory	Richard Jocelyn	Tory
1820, 10 August	John Foster	Tory	John Jocelyn	
1821, 27 September	Thomas Skeffington		John Jocelyn	
1824, 21 February	John Leslie Foster	Tory	John Jocelyn	
1826, 21 June	John Leslie Foster	Tory	Alexander Dawson	Radical
1830, 13 August	John McClintock	Tory	Alexander Dawson	Radical
1831, 18 May	Richard Lalor Sheil	Repeal Association	Alexander Dawson	Radical
1831, 28 September	Richard Lalor Sheil	Repeal Association	Sir Patrick Bellew, Bt	Whig
1832, 21 December	Thomas FitzGerald	Repeal Association	Richard Bellew	Repeal Association
1834, 24 December	Sir Patrick Bellew, Bt	Whig	Richard Bellew	Repeal Association
1837, 5 August	Henry Chester	Whig	Richard Bellew	Repeal Association
1840, 31 July	Thomas Fortescue	Whig	Richard Bellew	Repeal Association
1841, 15 July	Thomas Vesey Dawson	Whig	Richard Bellew	Whig
1847, 10 August	Chichester Fortescue	Whig	Richard Bellew	Whig
1852, 22 July	Chichester Fortescue	Whig	Tristram Kennedy	Ind. Irish
1857, 10 April	Chichester Fortescue	Whig	John McClintock	Conservative
1859, 16 May	Chichester Fortescue	Liberal	Richard Bellew	Liberal
1865, 15 April	Chichester Fortescue	Liberal	Tristram Kennedy	Liberal
1868, 24 November	Chichester Fortescue	Liberal	Matthew Dease	Liberal
1874, 14 February	Alexander Martin Sullivan	Home Rule League	Philip Callan (Note: Philip Callan was also returned for Dundalk, for which he chose to sit.)	Home Rule League
1874, 9 April	Alexander Martin Sullivan	Home Rule League	George Kirk	Home Rule League
1880, 9 April	Alexander Martin Sullivan	Home Rule League	Philip Callan	Home Rule League
1880, 31 May	Henry Bellingham	Home Rule League	Philip Callan	Home Rule League
1885	Constituency divided: see North Louth and South Louth			

=== MPs 1918–22 ===
Election	Member	Party
1918	John J. O'Kelly	Sinn Féin
1922	Constituency abolished	

== Elections ==
=== Elections in the 1830s ===
General election 1830: County Louth (2 seats)
Party	Candidate	Votes	%	±%
Radical	Alexander Dawson (MP)	294	32.9	
Tory	John McClintock	256	28.6	
Repeal	Richard Lalor Sheil	213	23.8	
Repeal	Richard Bellew	131	14.7	
Turnout		569	81.6	
Registered electors		697		
Majority		38	4.3	
Radical hold		Swing		
Majority		43	4.8	
Tory hold		Swing		

General election 1831: County Louth (2 seats)
Party	Candidate	Votes	%
Radical	Alexander Dawson (MP)	Unopposed	
Repeal	Richard Lalor Sheil	Unopposed	
Registered electors		697	
Radical hold			
Repeal gain from Tory			

Dawson's death caused a by-election.

By-election, 28 September 1831: County Louth
Party	Candidate	Votes	%
Whig	Patrick Bellew	Unopposed	
Registered electors		697	
Whig gain from Radical			

General election 1832: County Louth (2 seats)
Party	Candidate	Votes	%
Repeal	Thomas FitzGerald (MP for County Louth)	Unopposed	
Repeal	Richard Bellew	Unopposed	
Registered electors		863	
Repeal hold			
Repeal gain from Radical			

FitzGerald's death caused a by-election.

By-election, 24 December 1834: County Louth
Party	Candidate	Votes	%
Whig	Patrick Bellew	Unopposed	
Whig gain from Repeal			

General election 1835: County Louth (2 seats)
Party	Candidate	Votes	%
Whig	Patrick Bellew	497	40.8
Repeal (Whig)	Richard Bellew	456	37.4
Conservative	Chichester Thomas Skeffington Foster	265	21.8
Turnout		c. 609	c. 67.4
Registered electors		904	
Majority		41	3.4
Whig gain from Repeal			
Majority		191	15.6
Repeal hold			

General election 1837: County Louth (2 seats)
Party	Candidate	Votes	%
Whig	Henry Chester (MP)	Unopposed	
Repeal (Whig)	Richard Bellew	Unopposed	
Registered electors		995	
Whig hold			
Repeal hold			

=== Elections in the 1840s ===
Chester resigned by accepting the office of Steward of the Chiltern Hundreds, causing a by-election.

By-election, 31 July 1840: County Louth
Party	Candidate	Votes	%	±%
Whig	Thomas Fortescue	Unopposed		
Whig hold				

General election 1841: County Louth (2 seats)
Party	Candidate	Votes	%	±%
Whig	Richard Bellew	447	36.1	N/A
Whig	Thomas Vesey Dawson	430	34.7	N/A
Conservative	Matthew Fortescue	358	28.9	New
Conservative	John McClintock	4	0.3	New
Majority		72	5.8	N/A
Turnout		832	86.6	N/A
Registered electors		961		
Whig hold		Swing	N/A	
Whig gain from Repeal		Swing	N/A	

General election 1847: County Louth (2 seats)
Party	Candidate	Votes	%	±%
Whig	Richard Bellew	Unopposed		
Whig	Chichester Fortescue	Unopposed		
Registered electors		1,410		
Whig hold				
Whig hold				

=== Elections in the 1850s ===
General election 1852: County Louth (2 seats)
Party	Candidate	Votes	%	±%
Whig	Chichester Fortescue	1,152	38.0	N/A
Independent Irish	Tristram Kennedy	999	32.9	N/A
Conservative	John McClintock	884	29.1	New
Turnout		1,518 (est)	73.1 (est)	N/A
Registered electors		2,078		
Majority		153	5.1	N/A
Whig hold		Swing	N/A	
Majority		115	3.8	N/A
Independent Irish gain from Whig		Swing	N/A	

Fortescue was appointed a Lord Commissioner of the Treasury, requiring a by-election.

By-election, 27 February 1854: County Louth
Party	Candidate	Votes	%	±%
Whig	Chichester Fortescue	916	54.5	+16.5
Independent Irish	John MacNamara Cantwell	766	45.5	+12.6
Majority		150	9.0	+3.9
Turnout		1,682	80.9	+7.8
Registered electors		2,078		
Whig hold		Swing	+2.0	

General election 1857: County Louth (2 seats)
Party	Candidate	Votes	%	±%
Whig	Chichester Fortescue	1,376	36.8	−1.2
Conservative	John McClintock	1,059	28.4	−0.7
Whig	Richard Bellew	894	23.9	N/A
Independent Irish	Tristram Kennedy	406	10.9	−22.0
Turnout		1,868 (est)	77.3 (est)	+4.2
Registered electors		2,418		
Majority		317	8.5	+3.5
Whig hold		Swing	−0.4	
Majority		653	17.5	N/A
Conservative gain from Independent Irish		Swing	+5.2	

General election 1859: County Louth (2 seats)
Party	Candidate	Votes	%	±%
Liberal	Chichester Fortescue	1,379	36.8	—
Liberal	Richard Bellew	1,208	32.2	+8.3
Conservative	John McClintock	1,138	30.4	+2.0
Conservative	Frederick John Foster	23	0.6	N/A
Majority		70	1.8	−6.7
Turnout		1,874 (est)	76.8 (est)	−0.5
Registered electors		2,439		
Liberal hold		Swing	−0.5	
Liberal gain from Conservative		Swing	+3.7	

=== Elections in the 1860s ===
Bellew resigned after he was appointed a law commissioner, causing a by-election.

By-election, 15 April 1865 (1 seat)
Party	Candidate	Votes	%	±%
Liberal	Tristram Kennedy	1,002	52.1	−16.9
Conservative	John McClintock	923	47.9	+16.9
Majority		79	4.2	+2.4
Turnout		1,925	78.9	+2.1
Registered electors		2,441		
Liberal hold		Swing	−16.9	

General election 1865: County Louth (2 seats)
Party	Candidate	Votes	%	±%
Liberal	Chichester Parkinson-Fortescue	628	50.3	+13.5
Liberal	Tristram Kennedy	607	48.6	+16.4
Conservative	Frederick John Foster	8	0.6	—
Conservative	John McClintock	6	0.5	−29.9
Majority		599	48.0	+46.2
Turnout		625 (est)	25.6 (est)	−51.2
Registered electors		2,441		
Liberal hold		Swing	+14.2	
Liberal hold		Swing	+15.7	

Parkinson-Fortescue was appointed Chief Secretary for Ireland, requiring a by-election.

1866 County Louth by-election (1 seat)
Party	Candidate	Votes	%	±%
Liberal	Chichester Parkinson-Fortescue	Unopposed		
Registered electors		2,441		
Liberal hold				

General election 1868: County Louth (2 seats)
Party	Candidate	Votes	%	±%
Liberal	Chichester Parkinson-Fortescue	Unopposed		
Liberal	Matthew Dease	Unopposed		
Registered electors		2,443		
Liberal hold				
Liberal hold				

Parkinson-Fortescue was appointed Chief Secretary for Ireland, requiring a by-election.

1869 County Louth by-election (1 seat)
Party	Candidate	Votes	%	±%
Liberal	Chichester Parkinson-Fortescue	Unopposed		
Registered electors		2,443		
Liberal hold				

=== Elections in the 1870s ===
General election 1874: County Louth (2 seats)
Party	Candidate	Votes	%	±%
Home Rule	Alexander Martin Sullivan	1,250	37.6	New
Home Rule	Philip Callan	1,202	36.2	New
Liberal	Chichester Parkinson-Fortescue	608	18.3	N/A
Liberal	Matthew Dease	265	8.0	N/A
Majority		594	17.9	N/A
Turnout		1,834 (est)	79.2 (est)	N/A
Registered electors		2,316		
Home Rule gain from Liberal		Swing	N/A	
Home Rule gain from Liberal		Swing	N/A	

Callan was also elected MP for Dundalk and opted to sit there.

1874 County Louth by-election (1 seat)
Party	Candidate	Votes	%	±%
Home Rule	George Kirk	997	66.3	−7.5
Home Rule	Bernard Charles Molloy	507	33.7	+7.4
Majority		490	32.6	+14.7
Turnout		1,504	64.9	−14.3
Registered electors		2,316		
Home Rule hold		Swing	-7.5	

=== Elections in the 1880s ===
General election 1880: County Louth (2 seats)
Party	Candidate	Votes	%	±%
Home Rule	Philip Callan	902	37.6	+1.4
Home Rule	Alexander Martin Sullivan	830	34.6	−3.0
Home Rule	George Kirk	668	27.8	N/A
Majority		162	6.8	−11.1
Turnout		1,570 (est)	75.1 (est)	−4.1
Registered electors		2,091		
Home Rule hold		Swing	N/A	
Home Rule hold		Swing	N/A	

Sullivan declined to take the seat, causing a by-election.

1880 County Louth by-election (1 seat)
Party	Candidate	Votes	%	±%
Home Rule	Henry Bellingham	Unopposed		
Registered electors		2,091		
Home Rule hold				

=== Elections in the 1910s ===
1918 general election: County Louth
Party	Candidate	Votes	%	±%
Sinn Féin	John J. O'Kelly	10,770	50.6	New
Irish Parliamentary	Richard Hazleton	10,515	49.4	N/A
Majority		255	1.2	N/A
Turnout		21,285	73.0	N/A
Registered electors		29,176		
Sinn Féin win (new seat)				

== Sources ==
- The Parliaments of England by Henry Stooks Smith (1st edition published in three volumes 1844–50), 2nd edition edited (in one volume) by F.W.S. Craig (Political Reference Publications 1973)
- Walker, Brian M., ed. (1978). Parliamentary Election Results in Ireland, 1801–1922. Dublin: Royal Irish Academy. ISBN 0901714127.
- Kelly, O. S. (2006). County Louth: the Irish political revolution and the 1918 general election (MA thesis thesis). University College Dublin.
- Leigh Rayment's Historical List of MPs – Constituencies beginning with "L" (part 4)
