= Lord Lieutenant of Carlow =

Ceremonial officer in Carlow, Ireland

This is a list of people who have served as Lord Lieutenant of Carlow.

There were lieutenants of counties in Ireland until the reign of James II, when they were renamed governors. The office of Lord Lieutenant was recreated on 23 August 1831.

== Governors ==
- Dudley Bagenal 1689–1690 (Jacobite)
- Sir Thomas Butler, 3rd Baronet 1699–
- Henry O'Brien, 8th Earl of Thomond 1714–1741
- Sir Thomas Burdett, 1st Baronet, of Dunmore 1725–1727
- William Burton 1741–
- Beauchamp Bagenal 1767–1800
- Clement Wolseley
- William Henry Burton 1767–1800
- John Staunton Rochfort: 1779–1798 –1831
- David La Touche: 1798–1816
- William Browne: –1831
- Henry Bruen: 1816–1831
- Ulysses Burgh, 2nd Baron Downes: 1820–1831
- Thomas Kavanagh: –1831

== Lord Lieutenants ==
- John Ponsonby, 4th Earl of Bessborough: 17 October 1831 – 1838
- John Ponsonby, 5th Earl of Bessborough: November 1838 – 28 January 1880
- Arthur MacMurrough Kavanagh: 25 March 1880 – 25 December 1889
- Thomas McClintock-Bunbury, 2nd Baron Rathdonnell: 26 February 1890 – 1922
