= Bellingham baronets of Dubber (1667) =

Extinct baronetcy in Ireland

Escutcheon of the Bellingham baronets of Dubber

The Bellingham baronetcy, of Dubber in the County of Dublin, was created in the Baronetage of Ireland on 18 March 1667 for Daniel Bellingham, Deputy Receiver-General and Vice-Treasurer of Ireland. He was Lord Mayor of Dublin for 1665–6.

He was succeeded by his son, the 2nd Baronet, Sheriff of County Dublin in 1684. He was childless and on his death in 1699 the title became extinct.

== Bellingham baronets, of Dubber (1667–1699) ==
- Sir Daniel Bellingham, 1st Baronet (c. 1620–1672)
- Sir Richard Bellingham, 2nd Baronet (1648–1699)
