= John McClintock (1770–1855) =

Irish magistrate

John McClintock

John McClintock (14 August 1770 – 12 July 1855) was an Irish magistrate for County Louth, and formerly Serjeant at Arms in the Irish House of Commons.

== Early years ==
He was the eldest son of John 'Bumper Jack' McClintock, MP for Enniskillen and Belturbet in the Irish House of Commons who commissioned the building of this mansion at Drumcar House near Drumcar, northeast of Dunleer in 1777. His mother was Patience, daughter of William Foster, esq. M.P. for the Co. Louth, and first-cousin to John Foster, 1st Baron Oriel. His paternal grandfather was Alexander McClintock (died May 1775).

In 1787, John McClintock enrolled at Trinity College Dublin, studying for three and a half years before attaining his degree of Bachelor of Arts.

== Career ==
Though he had intended becoming a lawyer, McClintock was granted the office of Serjeant at Arms to the Irish House of Commons in 1794, aged 21, in conjunction with his younger brother, William Foster McClintock (died 1839).

McClintock was present during the Kingsborough Trial.

McClintock served the office of High Sheriff of Louth in 1798. He was present in the same year at the Battles of Arklow and Vinegar Hill. At the general election in 1820, McClintock was returned to the Parliament for Athlone, but he resigned his seat in the same year. In 1830, he took the place of John Leslie Foster, and he was elected after a poll.

His son, John McClintock, Major of the Louthshire militia, ran for the election to Parliament in 1841 representing County Louth, but was unsuccessful.

== Personal life ==
In February 1799, when his father Bumper Jack died aged 57, McClintock succeeded to run Drumcar House.

John married firstly Jane Bunbury on 11 July 1797, the only daughter of William Bunbury esq of Moyle. Jane was sister to Thomas Bunbury, MP for Co. Carlow. On 26 August 1798 Jane gave birth to a boy, John McClintock, 1st Baron Rathdonnell. A second son, William McClintock-Bunbury, was born in September 1800. In early 1801, Jane was killed in a tragic horse accident.

John married secondly on 15 April 1805, the Lady Elizabeth Le Poer Trench, third daughter of William Trench, 1st Earl of Clancarty. With Lady Elizabeth, John had five sons and three daughters:

- Frederick William Pitt McClintock
- Charles Alexander McClintock
- Rev. Robert Le Poer McClintock
- Henry Stanley McClintock (father of the Arctic explorer Francis Leopold McClintock who gave his name to the expanse McClintock Channel),
- George Augustus Jocelyn McClintock
- Anne Florence
- Harriet Elizabeth
- Emily Selina Frances.

He died in 1855 at Drumcar, survived by his second wife.

Parliament of the United Kingdom
Preceded by John Gordon	Member of Parliament for Athlone; 1820	Succeeded by David Ker
Preceded by Alexander Dawson; John Leslie Foster	Member of Parliament for County Louth; 1830 – 1831; With: Alexander Dawson	Succeeded by Alexander Dawson; Richard Lalor Shiel
