= Philip Callan =

Irish politician (1837-1902)

Philip Callan (1837 - 13 June 1902) was an Irish Member of Parliament.

== Early life ==
Callan was born in Cookstown House Ardee in 1837 and was the son of Owen Callan. He studied law at Trinity College Dublin, and also at the King's Inns as can be seen in his papers for Kings Inns Admittance. He was called to the Bar in Dublin in 1865 and shortly after was also called to the English Bar.

== Member of Parliament ==
Callan was elected to Parliament as a Liberal, for the Borough constituency of Dundalk, in 1868. Re-elected as a Home Ruler in the 1874 general election, he was elected also for County Louth. He chose to continue sitting for the Dundalk seat. In 1880, however, he ran for the Louth constituency instead and was elected, remaining as MP until the 1885 general election. He tried, unsuccessfully, to be re-elected in 1892 and 1896.

Callan died, from heart disease, at his residence in Dublin on 13 June 1902.

When in 1829 Catholics were admitted to parliament, his father, Owen Callan of Ardee, had been the first Catholic Representative of County Louth since the Battle of the Boyne. Mr. Philip Callan was devoted to Butt

— F. Hugh O'Donnell, A History of the Irish Parliamentary Party Vol. 1, Longmans, Green & Co. 1910

=== Walter Ernest Everard Callan ===
Walter Ernest Everard Callan, son of Philip Callan MP also studied Law and attended Kings Inns in Dublin. He was called to the Bar in 1903. Walter was private secretary to the last Viceroy in Ireland and continued in the civil service, serving in Australia as Private Secretary to the Governor General. Papers to this effect can be obtained from the National Library of Australia and correspondence from and to Mr Walter Callan can be seen in Prime Minister Deakins' Papers which are also available from the National Museum of Australia. Walter Callan went on to become Senior Counsel at the Irish Bar and resided at Baggot Street, Dublin until his death.

== Sources ==
- Note Mr. P. Callan, M.P was convicted of libel against Mr. A.M. Sullivan M.P. 30 Nov, 1880 (Magistrates List 1880)
- National Museum of Australia, Papers of Prime Minister Deakin of Australia.
- Kings Inns Admittance Papers of Philip Callan, 1865, Kings Inns Library.
- Kings Inns Admittance Papers of Walter Ernest Everard Callan, 1903, Kings Inns Library.
- Gerard Moran, "Philip Callan, A Nationalist MP", Article County Louth Archaeological Journal 1994. Available at Drogheda Civic Library.
- F. Hugh O'Donnell, A History of the Irish Parliamentary Party Vol 1 & 2. (1910), Longmans, Green & Co.

Parliament of the United Kingdom
Preceded by Sir George Bowyer, Bt	Member of Parliament for Dundalk; 1868 – 1880	Succeeded by Charles Russell
Preceded by Chichester Parkinson-Fortescue; Matthew O'Reilly Dease	Member of Parliament for County Louth; 1874 – 1874; With: Alexander Martin Sullivan	Succeeded by George Kirk; Alexander Martin Sullivan
Preceded by Alexander Martin Sullivan and George Kirk	Member of Parliament for County Louth; 1880 – 1885; With: Alexander Martin Sullivan to May 1880; Arthur Henry Bellingham from May 1880	Constituency abolished
