= Cairnes (surname) =

Cairnes is a surname. Notable people with the surname include:

- Alexander Cairnes (1665–1732), Irish politician and banker
- Colin and Cameron Cairnes, Australian filmmaking duo
- David Cairnes (1645–1722), Irish lawyer and MP
- Henry Cairnes (1673–1743), Irish politician, banker, and merchant
- Isaac Cairnes (died 1890), American politician
- Jack Cairnes (born 1943), American politician
- John Cairnes (politician) (17th century), Irish politician
- John Elliott Cairnes (1823–1875), Irish economist
- Joseph Cairnes (1907–1993), American engineer and baseball executive
- William Cairnes (c.1669–1707), Irish politician and merchant
- William Elliot Cairnes (1862–1902), Irish officer in the British Army

== See also ==
- Cairnes Anthony Daniell (1834–1915), British civil servant in India
- Cairnes baronets
- Mount Cairnes, Yukon, Canada
- Mount Cairnes (British Columbia)
- Cairns (disambiguation)
