= List of Irish MPs 1703–1713 =

This is a list of members of the Irish House of Commons between 1703 and 1713. There were 300 MPs at a time in this period.

Name	Constituency	Notes
Joseph Addison		Chief Secretary for Ireland 1708–1710
John Allen		
Joshua Allen		
Arthur Annesley		
John Asgill		
James Barry		
James Barry		
Edward Bayly		
Thomas Beecher		
Francis Bernard		
Sir Henry Bingham		
Robert Blennerhassett		
Thomas Bligh		
Sir Francis Blundell		
Sir Kildare Borrowes		
Gustavus Hamilton		
Thomas Brodrick		
Alan Brodrick		
St John Brodrick		
Sir Richard Bulkeley		
Sir Thomas Burdett		
Sir Pierce Butler		
Sir Thomas Butler		
Alexander Cairnes		
William Cairnes		
George Evans		
John Caulfeild		
William Conolly		
James Corry		
John Corry		
Joseph Deane		
Sir Thomas Dilkes	Castlemartyr	1703–1707
George Dodington		Chief Secretary for Ireland 1707–1708
John Perceval		
Thomas Erle		
John Forster		
Percy Freke		
Ralph Freke		
Sir Arthur Gore		
Sir Ralph Gore		
Frederick Hamilton		
William Handcock		
William Handcock		
Charles Howard		
Thomas Knox		
Sir Richard Levinge		
Robert Molesworth		
Sir Donough O'Brien		
Sir Thomas Prendergast		
William Robinson	Dublin University	
William Nassau de Zuylestein		
Robert Rochfort		
Oliver St George		
Richard St George		
Henry Boyle		
Edward Southwell	Dublin University	Chief Secretary for Ireland 1703–1707, 1710–1713
Thomas Southwell		
William Southwell		
Sir Richard Vernon		
William Whitshed		
