= List of parliaments of Ireland =

This is a list of parliaments of Ireland to 1801.

For subsequent parliaments, see the list of parliaments of the United Kingdom. For post-1918 parliaments, see elections in Ireland. Parliaments before 1264 are not currently listed.

Monarch	Sequence (Note: For medieval parliaments, no distinction is made between parliaments separated by dissolutions, sessions of a single parliament, and adjourned or prorogued portions of a session; all are treated as sessions.)	Opened	Dismissed (Note: For medieval parliaments, only the start date of the last session is known.)	Commons	Speaker (date (Note: Where no date is given, the speaker took the chair at the opening of Parliament))	Sessions	Great Councils (Note: The "Great Council" was similar to a Privy Council of Ireland meeting extended to members of parliament. Other "Councils" were similar but not summoned under the Great Seal of Ireland.)	Councils	Locations (no. sessions)	Notes
Henry III	—	18 June 1264	After 29 September 1269	None		2			Castledermot (1); unknown (1)	
Edward I	—	1276–7	After 9 April 1307			19		1	Dublin (13); Kildare (1); Kilkenny (4)	"Wogan's Parliament" of 1297 was the first with representatives elected by counties.
Edward II	—	9 February 1310	After 8 July 1326			14			Dublin (6), Kildare (1), Kilmainham (1), Kilkenny (5).	
Edward III	—	10 May 1327	After 8 January 1377			29	8	9	Dublin (20), Ballydoyle/Cashel (1), Kilkenny (11).	The Statutes of Kilkenny were passed by the 1366 session.
Richard II	—	14 January 1378	Summer 1396			13	5	11	Dublin (4), Trim (1), Kilkenny (2), Castledermot (4).	
Henry IV	—	Spring 1401	After 4 February 1412			13	2	5	Dublin (7), New Ross (1), Kilkenny (2) Waterford (2).	
Henry VI	—	1425	21 July 1460			32	17	1	Dublin (30), Trim (1), Naas (2), Drogheda (6), Kilkenny (1).	The 1460 parliament was assembled by Richard of York and declared that "the land of Ireland is, and at all times has been, corporate of itself".
Edward IV	—	12 June 1461	After 7 February 1483			61			Dublin (31), Bray (1), Trim (2), Naas (5), Limerick (1), Drogheda (15), Connell, County Kildare (1), Wexford (1), Waterford (1)	In 1478, Garret Mór, Earl of Kildare refused to yield the Lord Deputyship to Lord Grey. A Parliament summoned by Grey at Trim on 6 November 1478 annulled one summoned by Kildare at Naas in May.
Richard III	—	19 March 1484	After 24 October 1485			8	2		Dublin (3), Naas (2), Trim (2), unknown (1)	
Henry VII	—	14 July 1486	After July 1509			20	1	1	Dublin (9), Castledermot (2), Trim (2), Drogheda (4).	Poynings' Parliament (1494–5) annulled the 1493 Parliament summoned by Poynings' predecessor Robert Preston, 1st Viscount Gormanston, and passed Poynings' Law, which tightly regulated future Parliaments.
"Edward VI" (Lambert Simnel)	—	May/June 1487	October 1487			1	1		Dublin	Parliament summoned by Lord Deputy Kildare considered void; the 1495 statute 10 Hen. 7. c. 14 (I) may have annulled it.
Henry VIII	1	25 February 1516	2 October 1516			3			Dublin (3)	
Henry VIII	2	4 June 1521	21 March 1522			7			Dublin (7)	
Henry VIII	3	15 September 1531	31 October 1531			2			Dublin (1), Drogheda (1)	
Henry VIII	4	19 May 1533	After 2 October 1533			3			Dublin (3)	
Henry VIII	5	1 May 1536	20 December 1537			At least 9			Dublin (at least 6) Kilkenny (1), Cashel (1), Limerick (1)	Instigated the Reformation in Ireland. It also removed the right of the proctors, representing the lower clergy, to sit in Parliament.
Henry VIII	6	13 June 1541	19 November 1543		Sir Thomas Cusack (c. 13 June 1541)	8			Dublin (6), Trim (1), Limerick (1)	Passed the Crown of Ireland Act 1542
Mary I	1	1 June 1557	1 March 1558		James Stanihurst	3			Dublin (1), Limerick (1), Drogheda (1)	
Elizabeth I	1	12 January 1560	1 February 1560		James Stanihurst	1			Dublin	
Elizabeth I	2	17 January 1569	25 April 1571		James Stanihurst	10			Dublin (9), Drogheda (1)	
Elizabeth I	3	26 April 1585	14 May 1586	List	Nicholas Walsh	7				
James I	1	18 May 1613	24 October 1615		Sir John Davies	3				First Irish parliament with a Protestant majority, achieved largely (following the Ulster plantation) by the creation of new boroughs by the king, many of which were little more than villages or empty plots of land.
Charles I	1	14 July 1634	18 April 1635		Sir Nathaniel Catelyn	4				
Charles I	2	16 March 1639	30 January 1649 (Note: Dissolved by the King's death)	List	Sir Maurice Eustace	6				
Interregnum										30 Irish MPs sat at Westminster in the Protectorate Parliament (1653–59)
Charles II	1	8 May 1661	7 August 1666	List	Sir Audley Mervyn	4				Restoration Parliament
James II	1	7 May 1689	18 July 1689	List	Sir Richard Nagle	1				Patriot Parliament convened by Jacobites after the Revolution of 1688. The Irish act 7 Will. 3. c. 3 (I) (1695) annulled all actions of this "pretended Parliament" and ordered its records burnt.
William III and Mary II	1	5 October 1692	26 June 1693	List	Sir Richard Levinge	1				
William III	2	27 August 1695	14 June 1699	List	Robert Rochfort	2				
Anne	1	21 September 1703	6 May 1713	List	Alan Brodrick	6				
Anne	1	21 September 1703	6 May 1713	List	John Forster (19 May 1710)	6				
Anne	2	25 November 1713	1 August 1714	List	Alan Brodrick	1				Dissolved by the death of the Queen
George I	1	12 November 1715	11 June 1727	List	William Conolly	6				Dissolved by the death of the King
George II	1	28 November 1727	25 October 1760	List	William Conolly	17				Dissolved by the death of the King
George II	1	28 November 1727	25 October 1760	List	Sir Ralph Gore (13 October 1729)	17				Dissolved by the death of the King
George II	1	28 November 1727	25 October 1760	List	Henry Boyle (4 October 1733)	17				Dissolved by the death of the King
George II	1	28 November 1727	25 October 1760	List	John Ponsonby (26 April 1756)	17				Dissolved by the death of the King
George III	1	22 October 1761	28 May 1768	List	John Ponsonby	4				The Octennial Act passed in 1768 limited parliaments to a term of 8 years at most
George III	2	17 October 1769	5 April 1776	List	John Ponsonby	5				
George III	2	17 October 1769	5 April 1776	List	Edmund Sexton Pery (7 March 1771)	5				
George III	3	18 June 1776	25 July 1783	List	Edmund Sexton Pery	4				The Constitution of 1782 instigated Grattan's Parliament
George III	4	14 October 1783	8 April 1790	List	Edmund Sexton Pery	7				
George III	4	14 October 1783	8 April 1790	List	John Foster (5 September 1785)	7				
George III	5	2 July 1790	11 July 1797	List	John Foster	8				
George III	6	9 January 1798	31 December 1800	List	John Foster	3				Dissolved by the Acts of Union 1800

The kingdoms of Ireland and Great Britain joined on 1 January 1801. For subsequent parliaments see the list of parliaments of the United Kingdom.

== Sources ==
- Cosgrove, Art; Woods, C. J. (1984). "Parliament in Ireland, 1264–1800". In Moody, T. W.; Martin, F. X.; Byrne, F. J. (eds.). Maps, Genealogies, Lists: A Companion to Irish History, Part II. Oxford: Clarendon Press. pp. 593–608. ISBN 0-19-821745-5.
