= Irish Famine (1740–1741) =

Famine in the Kingdom of Ireland

Irish Famine (1740–1741) Bliain an Áir
- Ireland in the 1730s
- Country: Kingdom of Ireland
- Location: Ireland
- Period: 1740–1741
- Total deaths: 300,000–480,000
- Causes: Extreme weather
- Relief: See below
- Effect on demographics: Population fell by 13–20%
- Consequences: Permanent change in the country's demographic and economic landscape
- Succeeded by: The Great Famine (An Gorta Mór)

The Irish Famine of 1740–1741 (Irish: Bliain an Áir, meaning the Year of Slaughter) in the Kingdom of Ireland, is estimated to have killed between 13% and 20% of the 1740 population of 2.4 million people, which was a proportionately greater loss than during the Great Famine of 1845–1852.

The famine of 1740–1741 was due to extremely cold and then dry weather in successive years, resulting in food losses in three categories: a series of poor grain harvests, a shortage of milk, and frost damage to potatoes. At this time, grains, particularly oats, were more important than potatoes as staples in the diet of most workers.

Deaths from mass starvation in 1740–1741 were compounded by an outbreak of fatal diseases. The cold and its effects extended across Europe, but mortality was higher in Ireland because both grain and potatoes failed. This is now considered by scholars to be the last serious cold period at the end of the Little Ice Age of about 1400–1800.

The famine of 1740–1741 is different from the Great Famine of the 19th century. By the mid-19th century, potatoes made up a greater portion of Irish diets, with adverse consequences when the crop failed, causing famine from 1845 to 1852. The Great Famine differed by "cause, scale and timing" from the Irish Famine of 1740–1741. The Great Famine was instead caused by an oomycete infection which destroyed much of the potato crop for several years running, a crisis exacerbated by the laissez-faire policies of the ruling British government, continued exportation of food, insufficient relief, rigid government regulations and state sponsored evictions.

== Background ==
In 1740, Ireland had a population of 2.4 million people, most of whom depended on grains (oats, wheat, barley and rye) and potatoes as their staple foods. Half their expenses for food went for grain, 35% for animal products and the remainder for potatoes. Some survived only on oatmeal, buttermilk and potatoes. Over a year, in the period 1776-1778 (thirty years later), daily consumption of potatoes was estimated at 2.7 to 3.2 kg (6 to 7 lb) per person. Diets varied according to village locations and individual income, with many people supplementing these staples with river, lake or sea fish, especially herring, and small game such as wild duck. At the time social welfare was an entirely private initiative undertaken on a local level by the village or parish, with the government not being oriented to large-scale relief efforts.

== Cause ==
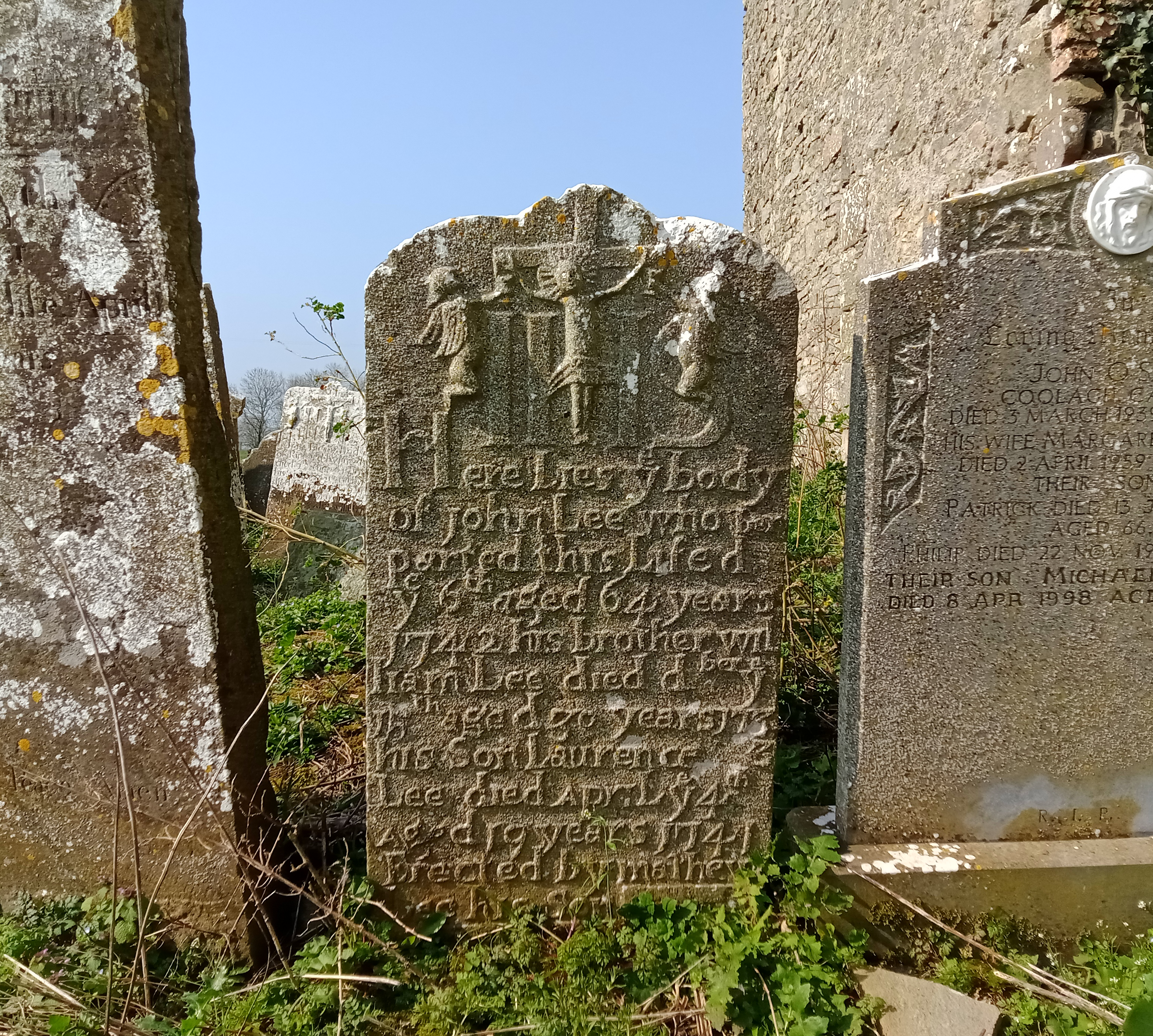
Gravestone in Coolaghmore, County Kilkenny of the Lee family, of whom three members died in 1741–42, aged 19, 30 and 64. The fact that they could afford a carved headstone makes it unlikely that they died of hunger, but the disease epidemics triggered by the famine may have caused the deaths of some or all of them.

An extraordinary climatic shock struck Ireland and the rest of Europe between December 1739 and September 1741 following a decade of relatively mild winters. Its cause remains unknown. Charting its course sharply illuminates how climatic events can result in famine and epidemic disease, and affect economies, energy sources, and politics. One possible cause could have been associated with two volcanic eruptions that occurred in Japan and Italy in 1739.

In the winter of 1739–1740, Ireland suffered seven weeks of very cold weather known as the "Great Frost". Although no barometric or temperature readings for Ireland survive from the Great Frost, a scattered few records survive from Englishmen who made personal readings. The mercury thermometer was invented 25 years earlier by German pioneer Daniel Gabriel Fahrenheit. Indoor values during January 1740 were as low as 10 °F (−12 °C). The one outdoor reading that has survived was stated as "thirty-two degrees of frost," equivalent to 0 °F (−18 °C). This did not include the effects of the wind chill factor, which would have been severe. This kind of weather was "quite outside the Irish experience," notes David Dickson, author of Arctic Ireland: The Extraordinary Story of the Great Frost and Forgotten Famine of 1740–41.

In the period before the crisis in January 1740, the winds and terrible cold intensified, yet barely any snow fell. Ireland was locked into a stable and vast high-pressure system which affected most of Europe in a broadly similar way, from Scandinavia and Russia to northern Italy. Rivers, lakes, and waterfalls froze and fish died in these first weeks of the Great Frost. People tried to avoid hypothermia without using up winter fuel reserves in a matter of days. People living in the country were probably better off than city-dwellers because in Ireland country people had cabins sheltered by turf stacks, while the latter, especially the poor, dwelt in freezing basements and garrets.

Coal dealers and shippers during normal times ferried coal from Cumbria and South Wales to east and south-coast ports in Ireland, but the ice-bound quays and frozen coal yards temporarily stopped such trade. When in late January 1740 the traffic across the Irish Sea resumed, retail prices for coal soared. Desperate people stripped bare hedges, ornamental trees, and nurseries around Dublin to obtain substitute fuel. Also affected by the frost were the pre-industrial town mill-wheels, which froze. The machinery was stilled that customarily ground wheat for the bakers, tucked cloth for the weavers, and pulped rags for the printers. The abrupt weather change disrupted craft employment and food processing.

== Protestants and alms-giving ==
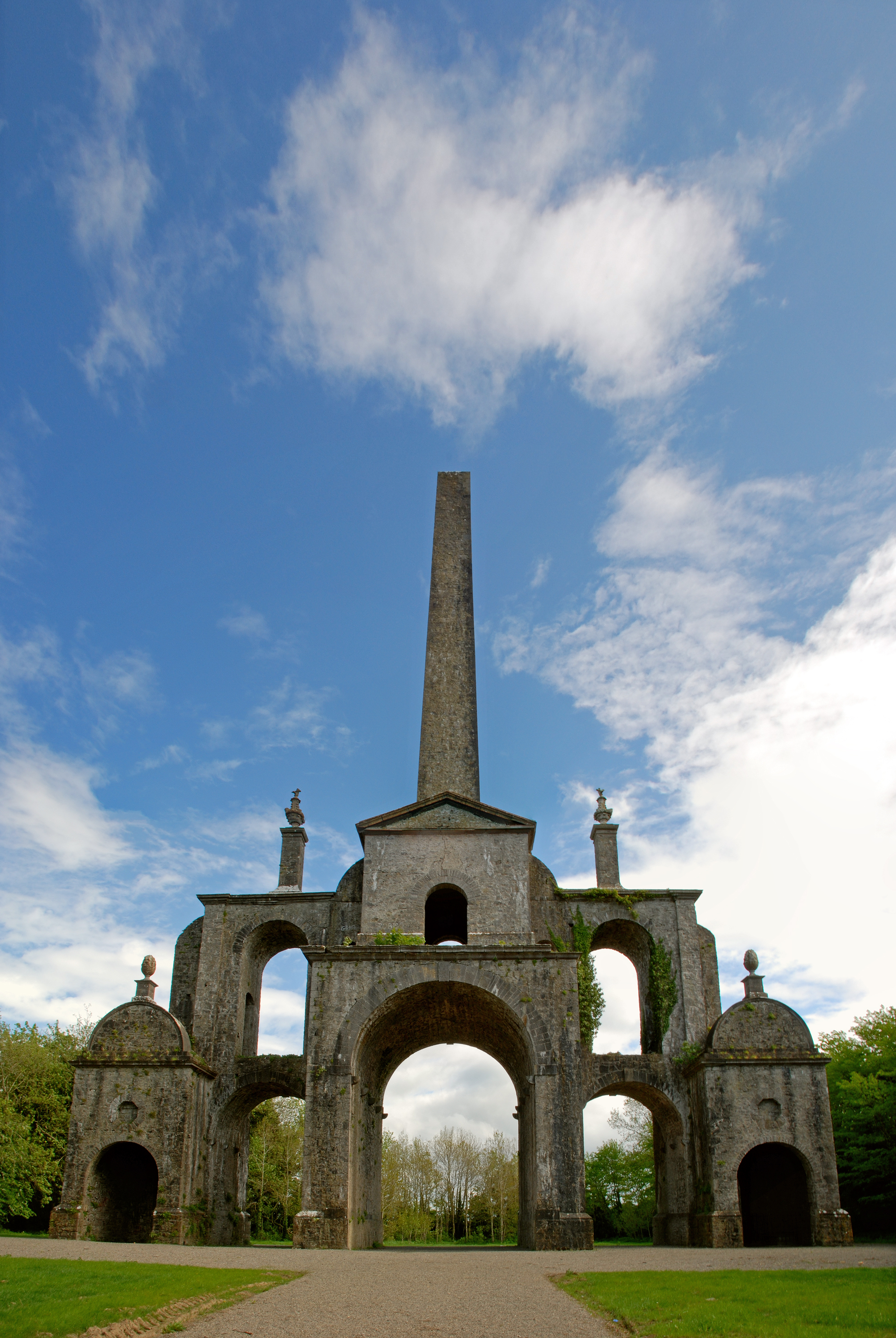
The Conolly Folly, built in 1740 to give employment to local workers

The municipal leaders (mostly Protestant merchants and members of the landed gentry) paid closer attention to the state of urban and rural artisans and tradespeople because of their contributions to the commercial economy on which the landowners depended. These leaders knew from experience that "an unemployed or hungry town often became a sickly town and such sickness might be no respecter of class or wealth". This is what happened as the Frost continued.

The propertied classes began to respond to fuel and food shortages when the Frost was about two weeks old. The Church of Ireland parish clergy solicited donations, which they converted into free rations in the city parishes, distributing nearly 80 tons of coal and ten tons of meal four weeks into the Frost. The Lord Lieutenant, the Duke of Devonshire, in an unprecedented move on 19 January 1740, prohibited the export of grain out of Ireland to any destination except Britain. This action was in response to Cork Corporation (City of Cork), which remembered vividly the city events of eleven years earlier when serious food riots erupted and four people died.

In Celbridge, County Kildare, Katherine, the widow of William Conolly, commissioned the construction of the Conolly Folly in 1740 to give employment to local workers. In 1743, she had The Wonderful Barn built nearby as a food store in case of further famines.

== Potatoes deteriorate ==
The Great Frost affected the potato, which was one of the two main staples (the other was oatmeal) in rural Ireland. Potatoes typically were left in storage in gardens and in special storage in fields. The crops from the autumn of 1739 were frozen, destroyed and inedible. They could not serve as seeds for the next growing season. "Richard Purcell, one of the best rural witnesses of the unfolding crisis, reported in late February [1740] that had the Frost not occurred, there would have been enough potatoes in his district to have kept the country [Ireland] fed until August [1740], indicating a rare local abundance of the crop. 'But both root and branch…is destroyed every where', except for 'a few which happen'd to be housed', and 'in a very few deep…and turfy moulded gardens where some, perhaps enough for seed for the same ground, are sound.'"

At that time, potatoes were typically stored in the fields where they were grown, in earthen banks known as potato clamps. They were put among layers of soil and straw that normally prevented frost from penetrating deeply enough to destroy the contents of the clamp. This disruption of the agricultural cycle created problems in Ireland in the winter of 1740–1741.

== Spring drought, 1740 ==
In spring 1740, the expected rains did not arrive. Although the Frost dissipated, the temperatures remained low and the northerly winds fierce. The drought killed off animals in the field, particularly sheep in Connacht and black cattle in the south.

By the end of April, it destroyed much of the tillage crops (wheat and barley) sown the previous autumn, and grains were more important in the diet than were potatoes. The important corn crop also failed, which resulted in greater mortality in Ireland than in Britain or the Continent.

Grains were so scarce that the Irish hierarchy of the Catholic Church allowed Catholics to eat meat four days each week during Lent, but not everyone could afford meat. The potato crisis caused an increase in grain prices, resulting in smaller and smaller loaves of bread for the old price. Dickson explains that the "wholesale rise in the price of wheat, oats and barley reflected not just the current supply position, but the dealers' assessment as to the state of things later in the year."

By summer 1740, the Frost had decimated the potatoes, and the drought had decimated the grain harvest and herds of cattle and sheep. Starving rural dwellers started a "mass vagrancy" towards the better-supplied towns, such as Cork in southern Ireland. By mid-June 1740, beggars lined the streets.

== Food riots ==
With the soaring cost of food, hungry townspeople "vented their frustration on grain dealers, meal-mongers and bakers, and when they turned to direct action the most likely flashpoints were markets or warehouses" where food owners stored bulk food. The first "flareup" occurred at Drogheda, north of Dublin on the east coast of Ireland, in mid-April. A band of citizens boarded a vessel laden with oatmeal, which was preparing to depart for Scotland. They removed the rudder and sails. The officials made sure that Scotland would receive no more food from their port. They, like the Cork Corporation officials, wanted no trouble from the Irish citizens.

A riot broke out in Dublin on Saturday and Sunday near the end of May 1740 when the populace believed that bakers were holding off baking bread. They broke into the bakers' shops and sold some of the loaves, giving the money to the bakers. Other people simply took the bread and left. On Monday, rioters raided to take the meal from mills near the city and resold it at discounted prices. Trying to restore order, troops from the Royal Barracks killed several rioters. City officials tried to "smoke out hoarders of grain and to police food markets, but prices remained stubbornly high throughout the summer".

Similar skirmishes over food continued in different Irish cities throughout the summer of 1740. The War of the Austrian Succession (1740–1748) began, interrupting trade as Spanish privateers captured ships bound for Ireland, including those carrying grain. Linen, salted beef and pickled butter were Ireland's chief export earners, and the war endangered this trade as well.

== The cold returns ==
In autumn 1740, a meagre harvest commenced and prices in the towns started to fall. Cattle began to recover. But in the dairying districts, cows had been so weak after the Frost that at least a third of them had failed to "take bull," or become impregnated by breeding. This resulted in fewer calves, a shortage of milk, which was widely consumed, and a decline in butter production.

To make conditions worse, blizzards swept along the east coast in late October 1740 depositing snow and returned several times in November. A massive rain downpour on 9 December 1740 caused widespread flooding. A day after the floods, the temperature plummeted, snow fell, and rivers and other bodies of water froze. Warm temperatures followed the cold snap, which lasted about ten days. Great chunks of ice careened down the Liffey River through the heart of Dublin, overturning light vessels and causing larger vessels to break anchor.

The strange autumn of 1740 pushed food prices up. Dublin wheat prices on 20 December were at an all-time high. The widening wars in mid-December 1740 encouraged people with stored food to hoard it. The populace needed food, and riots erupted again in various cities throughout the country. By December 1740, signs were growing that full-blown famine and epidemic were upon the citizens of Ireland.

== Relief schemes ==
The Lord Mayor of Dublin, Samuel Cooke, consulted with the Lords Justices – Archbishop Boulter; Henry Boyle, Speaker of the Commons; and Lord Jocelyn, the Lord Chancellor of Ireland – on 15 December 1740 to figure out a way to bring down the price of corn. Boulter launched an emergency feeding programme for the poor of Dublin at his own expense. The Privy Council instructed the High Sheriff in each county to count all stocks of grain in the possession of farmers and merchants and to report total cereal stocks in their county.

The reports indicated a number of privately held stocks, for instance County Louth held over 85,000 barrels of grain, mainly oats, owned by some 1,655 farmers. Some major landowners, such as the widow of Speaker William Conolly, builder of Castletown House, distributed food and cash during the "black spring" of 1741 on their own initiative. The widow Conolly and other philanthropists hired workers to develop infrastructure or do work associated with local improvements: such as building an obelisk, paving, fencing, draining, making roads or canals, and cleaning harbours. In Drogheda, the Chief Justice of the Irish Common Pleas, Henry Singleton, a citizen of the town, donated much of his private fortune for famine relief.

== Return of normal weather ==
Five vessels loaded with grain, presumably from British America, reached Galway on the west coast in June 1741. In the first week of July 1741, grain prices at last decreased and old-hoarded wheat suddenly flooded the market. The quality of the Autumn harvest of 1741 was mixed. The food crisis was over, and seasons of rare plenty followed for the next two years.

== Death toll ==
Documentation of deaths was poor during the Great Frost. Cemeteries provide fragmentary information, e.g., during February and March 1740, 47 children were buried in St. Catherine's parish. The normal death rate tripled in January and February 1740, and burials averaged out about 50% higher during the twenty-one-month crisis than for the years 1737–1739, according to Dickson. Summing up all his sources, Dickson suggests that the famine resulted in the deaths of between 13 and 20% of the population.

Based on contemporary accounts and burial parish records, famine-related deaths may have totalled 300,000–480,000 in Ireland, with rates highest in the south and east of the country. This was a proportionately greater toll than during the Great Famine (1845–52). That famine, however, was unique in "cause, scale and timing", persisting over several years.

== Summary ==
The Irish Great Frost of 1740–1741 demonstrated human social behaviour under crisis conditions and the far-reaching effects of a major climate crisis. As conditions eased, "the population entered into a period of unprecedented growth", although additional famines occurred during the eighteenth century. Dickson notes that an upsurge in migration out of Ireland in the years after the 1740–1741 crisis did not take place, perhaps in part because conditions improved relatively quickly although the most likely primary reason was that a transoceanic voyage was far beyond the means of most of the population at this time. Irish dendrochronologist Mike Baillie has confirmed tree ring patterns in 1740 that were consistent with severe cold.

The year 1741, during which the famine was at its worst and mortality was greatest, was known in folk memory as the "year of the slaughter" (or bliain an áir in Irish).

== See also ==
- Great Famine (Ireland) (1845–1852)
- Irish Famine (1879)
- List of famines

== Bibliography ==
- Mike Baillie: A Slice Through Time: Dendrochronology and Precision Dating. Routledge, London, 1996, pp. 16–31.
- E. Margaret Crawford (ed.), Famine: the Irish experience, Edinburgh: John Donald, 1989
- David Dickson, Arctic Ireland (White Row Press, Dublin 1997).
- Dillon Papers, N.L.I. Mic. P. 2762, John Scott, Cork to Thomas Dillon & Co, 25 Jan 1739–40: "An express from Corke, with an account of a blood battle fought between the mob of that city and the standing army…(Dublin, 1729). Cork merchants in 1740 were adamant that they would not risk shipping out corn from the port." Source: Footnote 12 in Dickson, p. 78.brendan
- Michael Drake, "The Irish Demographic Crisis of 1740–41", Historical Studies VI, T. W. Moody (ed.), Routledge & Kegan Paul, London 1968.
- Neal Garnham: "Local Elite Creation in Early Hanoverian Ireland: The Case of the County Grand Jury", The Historical Journal, September 1999, volume 42, number 3, pp. 623–642.
- Geber, J. and Murphy, E. (2012), Scurvy in the Great Irish Famine: Evidence of vitamin C deficiency from a mid-19th century skeletal population. Am. J. Phys. Anthropol., 148: 512–524. doi:10.1002/ajpa.22066
- Joe Lee, The Modernisation of Irish Society (ISBN 0-7171-0567-9)
- Brendan McWilliams (19 February 2001). "The Great Frost and forgotten famine". The Irish Times.
- Eamonn O Ciardha: Ireland and the Jacobite Cause, 1685–1766: A Fatal Attachment, Four Courts Press, Dublin, 2002. Review at Reviews in History. Accessed 18 September 2018.
- Cathal Póirtéir, (ed.) The Great Irish Famine, Mercier Press 1955
- Gary L. Roberts: Doc Holliday: The Live and the Legend, John Wiley & Sons, 2006, p. 10.
- SEMP Biot Report #430: "Dendrochronology: How Climate Catastrophes Show Up in Tree Rings" (11 June 2007). Available at http://www.semp.us/publications/biot_reader.php?Bi...; accessed 11 July 2007.
