= List of Irish MPs 1715–1727 =

This is a list of members of the Irish House of Commons between 1715 and 1727. There were 300 MPs at a time in this period.

Name	Constituency	Notes
John Stratford		
John Allen		
Joshua Allen		
James Barry		
James Barry		
James Barry		
Redmond Barry		
Michael Beecher		
Francis Bernard		
Martin Bladen	Bandonbridge	Joint Chief Secretary for Ireland, 1715–1717
William Blakeney		
Walter Borrowes		
Thomas Brodrick		
St John Brodrick		
Henry Brooke		
Eustace Budgell		
Sir Thomas Burdett		
Thomas Burgh		
Francis Burton		
Alexander Cairnes		
William Flower		
Thomas Clutterbuck	Lisburn	Chief Secretary for Ireland, 1724–1730
Henry Colley		
William Conolly		
Algernon Coote		
Thomas Coote	County Monaghan	
James Corry		
John Corry		
James Stopford		
Arthur Hill		
Charles Fane		
John Folliot		
John Forster		
Percy Freke		
Ralph Freke		
Luke Gardiner		
Sir Arthur Gore		
George Gore	Longford Borough	
Sir Ralph Gore		
Gustavus Hamilton		
Henry Hamilton		
Gustavus Handcock		
William Handcock		
Trevor Hill		
Thomas Knox		
Humphrey Butler		
Richard Molesworth		
Alexander Montgomery		
Brockhill Newburgh		
Sir John Osborne		
William Ponsonby		
Oliver St George		
Richard St George		
Henry Boyle		
Thomas Southwell		
Thomas Southwell		
William Southwell		
Charles Stewart		
Frederick Trench		
Marcus Beresford		
John Ussher		
Michael Ward		
Edward Worth		
Owen Wynne		
