= 1713 Irish general election =

- May 1713

All 300 seats of the House of Commons 151 seats were needed for a majority
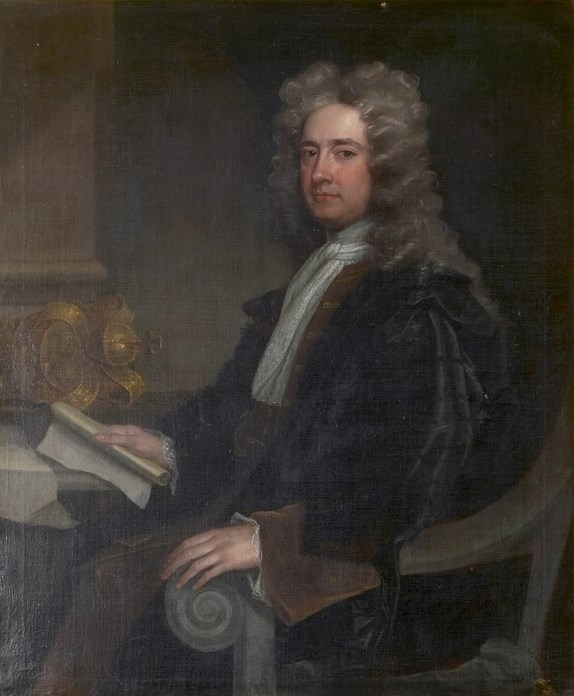

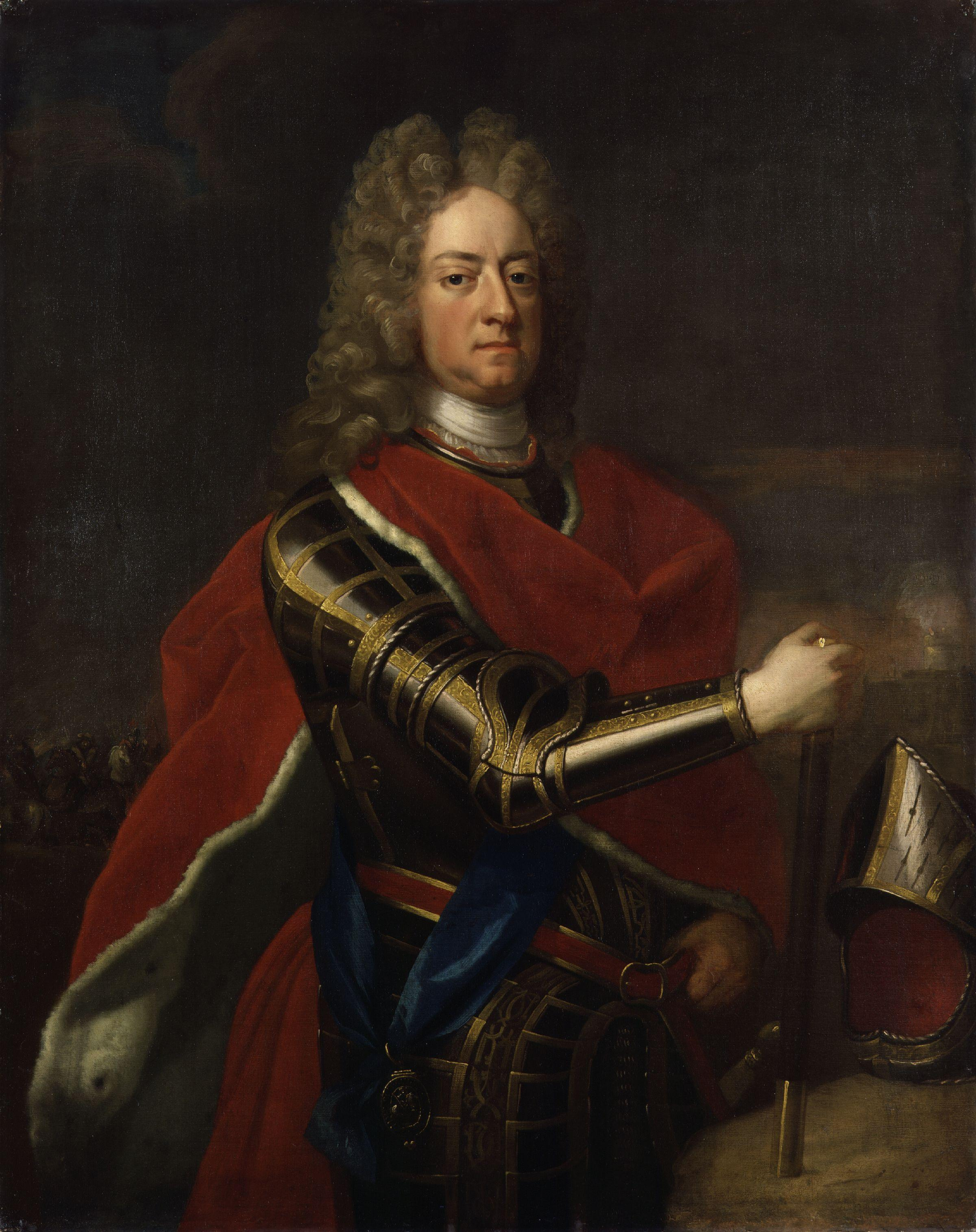
	First party	Second party
Leader	William Conolly	Duke of Ormonde
Party	Whig	Tory
Seats won	151+
Seat change	▲	▼
Popular vote	-	-
Percentage	-	-

The 1713 Irish general election returned members to serve in the House of Commons. The election took place during a high-point for party politics in Ireland, and saw heavy losses for the Tories and the emergence of a Whiggish majority in the commons.

== Election ==
Since 1703 Irish politics had taken on a far more confrontational hue, with clear party dividing lines being drawn along Tory-Whig lines, mirroring the division in England (and later Great Britain). Simultaneously Irish politics, like British politics, had come to focus on questions of religion, with the ruling Anglican elite fearing subversion from both the majority Catholic population, and the growing, and equally hostile, Presbyterian population in Ulster.

Irish Whigs advocated Protestant unity, seeing Catholics as the greatest threat, and thereby advocated further penal laws. In contrast the Tories regarded Ireland's Catholics as a spent force, and focused their efforts on dealing with Ireland's growing Presbyterian population. The Tories therefore advocated retaining the Sacramental Test clause of the 1704 Popery Act, which excluded from public office those who refused to receive the sacrament in the manners according to the established church, which in Ireland's case was the Anglican Church of Ireland.

Whilst the Tories could rely on support for their views on the Test clause, they were vulnerable on issues relating to succession. Irish public opinion, fearful of a return of the Jacobites, rallied behind the Whigs, ushering in a pro-Hanoverian and anti-ministerial majority in the commons. The Irish Whigs used the popular cry "No peace without Spain" as an electoral slogan.

The voting for the Dublin City constituency was hotly disputed, leading to the Dublin election riot.

== Dates of election ==
At this period elections did not take place at the same time in every constituency. The returning officer in each county or parliamentary borough fixed the precise date (see hustings for details of the conduct of the elections).

== See also ==
- List of parliaments of Ireland
- MPs elected in the Irish general election, 1713
