= List of Irish MPs 1695–1699 =

This is a list of members of the Irish House of Commons between 1695 and 1699. There were 300 MPs at a time in this period.

Name	Constituency	Dates	Notes
James Hamilton			
Sir Nicholas Acheson			
Richard Aldworth	Dublin University		Chief Secretary for Ireland 1693-96
John Allen			
James Barry			
James Barry			
Thomas Beecher			
Sir Tristram Beresford			
Francis Bernard			
Sir Henry Bingham			
Robert Blennerhassett			
Thomas Bligh			
Sir Francis Blundell			
Gustavus Hamilton			
St John Brodrick			
Thomas Brodrick			
Alan Brodrick			
Sir Richard Bulkeley			
Sir Thomas Butler			
Henry Colley	County Kildare	1698–1699	
William Conolly			
James Corry			
Francis Folliott			
Henry Folliott			
Percy Freke			
Thomas Handcock			
William Handcock			
William Handcock			
Michael Hill			
Thomas FitzMaurice			
Thomas Knox			
Sir Richard Levinge			
James Macartney			
Robert Molesworth			
Sir Thomas Molyneux			
William Molyneux			
Sir Donough O'Brien			
Charles Boyle			
William Palmer	Castlebar		Chief Secretary for Ireland 1696-97
Henry Petty			
William Robinson	Wicklow		Surveyor General of Ireland
Robert Rochfort			
Sir John Rogerson			
Popham Seymour			
Thomas Southwell			
Arthur St George			
Bryan Townsend			
John Trevor			
William Nassau de Zuylestein			
Joseph Williamson			
