= List of Irish MPs 1713–1714 =

This is a list of members of the Irish House of Commons between 1713 and 1714. There were 300 MPs at a time in this period.

Name	Constituency	Notes
John Allen		
Joshua Allen		
James Barry		
James Barry		
Richard Barry	Baltimore	
Edward Bayly		
Michael Beecher		
Arthur Bernard	Bandonbridge	
Francis Bernard		
Sir Henry Bingham		
Gustavus Hamilton		
Alan Brodrick		
St John Brodrick		
Henry Brooke		
Sir Thomas Burdett		
Thomas Burgh		
Samuel Burton		
Sir Pierce Butler		
Alexander Cairnes		
George Evans		
William Conolly		
James Corry		
Arthur Davys		
Joseph Deane		
Sir Matthew Deane		
John Forster		
Ralph Freke		
Sir Arthur Gore		
Sir Ralph Gore		
Frederick Hamilton		
William Handcock		
Trevor Hill		
Peter Holmes		
Thomas Knox		
Sir Richard Levinge		
Robert Molesworth		
Sir Donough O'Brien		
Sir John Perceval	County Cork	
Richard Pockrich		
John Rogerson		
Oliver St George		
Richard St George		
William Southwell		
Sir John Stanley		Chief Secretary for Ireland, 1713–14
Michael Ward		
William Whitshed		
