= Collegiate School Celbridge =

Coordinates: 53°20′06″N 6°33′11″W

- Location within Ireland
- Former names: Setanta House Hotel
- Alternative names: Celbridge Manor Hotel

General information
- Status: Hotel
- Type: School
- Architectural style: Georgian
- Location: Celbridge, County Kildare, Ireland
- Construction started: 1733
- Estimated completion: 1737

Technical details
- Material: limestone

Design and construction
- Architect: Thomas Burgh
- Developer: Katherine Conolly and William Conolly

Celbridge Collegiate School is a former charter school and Protestant girls school situated outside Celbridge in County Kildare in Ireland located 22 kilometres (13 miles) from Dublin. It was known as a nursery of teachers for the Church of Ireland training college and for the proficiency of the Irish language among students.

== History ==
The vision for the school was set out in the will of William Conolly:

"to be laid out by them a convenient building in or near to the town of Celbridge in the county of Kildare on such spot of ground as shall be set out for them for that purpose by my said dear wife and nephew for the reception of forty orphans or other poor children.”

It was developed from 1733–7 by Katherine Conolly, who gave £50 a year for its maintenance during her life.

=== Architecture ===
The building is of Georgian architecture and its most characteristic feature is the triple gates. It was designed by architect Thomas Burgh who also built the Royal Barracks and famous library building at Trinity College both in Dublin on fifty acres of land to accommodate forty female who were to be "lodged, clothed and dieted" there. The aim of this charity school was to rescue children of the "poor natives from ignorance and superstition" and instruct them in "the English tongue, in manners and in the Protestant faith." Students were employed on the farm and they carried on linen and hempen manufacture through all stages from seed, to loom, to bleaching.

In 1837 one hundred students attended, thirty of whom were nominated by Edward Conolly. At the time of Lady Louisa's death it had 600 pupils, It served as a boarding school for Protestant girls until 1973. when the Incorporated Society for Promoting Protestant Schools in Ireland closed the school and transferred the pupils to Kilkenny College.

=== Hotel ===
The building reopened as the Setanta House Hotel on January 25, 1980 and it later became the Celbridge Manor Hotel. It was acquired by a consortium led by US businessman Jeff Leo in 2013 and was later sold in 2022 for around €5.5m.

== Principals (Headmistresses) ==
- 1783 Mary Taylor
- 1789 Katharine Holt
- 1811 Bridget Boyle
- John Boyle husband of Bridget
- 1850 Mary McKenny Died
- 1851 Anne Boyle
- 1859 Sarah Crawford
- 1864 Anne Crawford (Interim)
- 1864 Eliza Crawford (Interim)
- 1867 Anne E Crawford
- 1894 Bessie St George (Matron)
- 1895 Augusta L’Estrange
- 1898 Annie McCullough
- 1909 Georgina E Osborne
- (Died before taking up office
- 1909 Emma McClelland
- 1920 Dora Cos (Interim)
- 1920 Emma McClelland
- 1942 Anna Hadassah "Nancy" O’Connor
- 1967 Mary Taylor
- 1970 Freda D Yates
- 1973 School closed
