= Michael Beecher =

Michael Beecher may refer to:

- Michael Beecher (politician) (1673–1726), Irish MP for Baltimore
- Michael Beecher (actor) (1939–1993), Australian actor and model
