= Sir Thomas Prendergast, 2nd Baronet =

Irish politician

Sir Thomas Prendergast, 2nd Baronet (1702 – 23 September 1760) was an Irish politician. His career was helped by influential family connections, but apparently hampered by his own lack of ability. To Jonathan Swift, who detested him, he was "Noisy Tom", while the King called him "that Irish blockhead".

== Early life ==
He was the eldest son of Sir Thomas Prendergast, 1st Baronet, and his wife Penelope Cadogan, sister of William Cadogan, 1st Earl Cadogan. He was a first cousin of Sarah Lennox, Duchess of Richmond, and was assiduous in using the powerful Lennox connection to further his career. He succeeded his father in the baronetcy in 1709. His mother spent her later years in a state of almost continuous litigation, including a lawsuit against her own brother over young Thomas's inheritance, an almost interminable lawsuit with Sir Toby Butler and his heirs over the ownership of lands in County Galway, and a lawsuit brought by the O'Shaughnessy family over their forfeited estate at Gort, which had been acquired by Thomas's father.

He was educated at Clare College, Cambridge and the Inner Temple.

== Career ==
He was elected to the Irish House of Commons for Clonmel (1727–1760) and, with the help of the Richmonds, to the British House of Commons as Member of Parliament for Chichester from 1733 to 1734. Having been returned as a Government candidate, he promptly infuriated the administration by voting against a Government bill. He lost his seat in the English Commons the following year, and despite his best efforts was never able to obtain another.

His father was born a Roman Catholic but both father and son for the sake of their careers were obliged to conform to the Church of Ireland. Despite his nominal Protestantism young Thomas was noted for his anti-clerical views, and this earned him the enmity of Swift, who mocked him as "Noisy Tom". Swift also vilified the elder Sir Thomas, describing him as a traitor, informer and assassin. These charges have no foundation, and seem to be a garbled reference to the elder Sir Thomas's role in uncovering the Assassination Plot of 1696, which was admittedly very advantageous to the Prendergast family. King George II of Great Britain called the younger Thomas "that Irish blockhead", an opinion which seems to have been widely shared.

In 1754, the younger Sir Thomas was made Custos Rotulorum and Governor of County Galway. He was Postmaster General for Ireland, a post he seems to have performed capably enough, and a member of the Privy Council of Ireland. He was a leading Freemason.

== Personal life ==
In 1739 he married Anne Williams, daughter of Sir Griffith Williams, 6th Baronet of the Williams-Bulkeley baronets of Penrhyn and his wife Catherine Anwyl, but they had no children.

After Sir Thomas's death, his widow married his cousin, Terence Prendergast, causing a minor scandal. The baronetcy expired but Prendergast's estates were inherited by his nephew, John Prendergast-Smyth, 1st Viscount Gort, the son of his sister Elizabeth and her husband Charles Smyth. At the time of his death he was apparently expecting to be raised to the peerage as Viscount Clonmel.

Parliament of Ireland
Preceded by Robert Marshall; Robert Hamerton	Member of Parliament for Clonmel; 1733–1760; With: Robert Marshall 1733–1756; William Bagwell 1756–1757; Guy Moore 1757–1760	Succeeded by Guy Moore; Richard Moore
Parliament of Great Britain
Preceded by Lord William Beauclerk; James Lumley	Member of Parliament for Chichester; 1733 – 1734; With: James Lumley	Succeeded by James Brudenell; Thomas Yates
Baronetage of Ireland
Preceded by Thomas Prendergast	Baronet (of Gort); 1709–1760	Extinct
