= Prendergast baronets =

Extinct baronetcy in the Baronetage of Ireland

The Prendergast Baronetcy, of Gort in the County of Galway was a title in the Baronetage of Ireland. It was created on 15 July 1699 for the Irish soldier and politician Thomas Prendergast.

Sir Thomas was killed at the Battle of Malplaquet in 1709 and was succeeded by his son, the second baronet. He was a member of both the Irish and British Parliaments. He was to be created Viscount Clonmel but died childless in September 1760 before the patent was completed. On his death, the baronetcy became extinct. However, the Prendergast estates passed to the late baronet's nephew, John Smyth, the second son of his sister Elizabeth and her husband Charles Smyth. He assumed the surname of Prendergast and was created Viscount Gort in 1816.

== Prendergast baronets, of Gort (1699) ==
- Sir Thomas Prendergast, 1st Baronet (died 1709)
- Sir Thomas Prendergast, 2nd Baronet (died 1760)

== See also ==
- Viscount Gort
