= De Neufville baronets =

Escutcheon of the de Neufville baronets of Frankfort

The de Neufville baronetcy, of Frankfurt in Germany, was a title in the Baronetage of Great Britain. It was created by Queen Anne of Great Britain on 18 March 1709 for Robert de Neufville, born in Frankfurt to the banker Peter de Neufville (1623–1691) and his wife Maria Clinget (died 1673). At the time of his death he was the Postmaster General at the Dutch City of Leiden. The title is presumed to have become extinct on his death.

== De Neufville baronets, of Frankfort (1709) ==
- Sir Robert de Neufville, 1st Baronet (1671–1735)

Baronetage of Great Britain
| Preceded by Cairnes baronets | De Neufville baronets of Frankfurt; 18 March 1709 | Succeeded by Abercrombie baronets |
