= Haman baronets =

Extinct baronetcy in the Baronetage of Ireland

The Haman Baronetcy, of Woodhill, was a title in the Baronetage of Ireland by George II. It was created on 19 November 1727 for John Dickson Haman. He married Elizabeth, second daughter of Sir Thomas Prendergast, 1st Baronet [I. 1699], of Gort, co. Galway, by Penelope Cadogan, daughter of Henry Cadogan, of Liscartan, County Meath.

The title became extinct on his death on 28 January 1728, a few months after his creation.

== Haman baronets, of Woodhill (1727) ==
- Sir John Dickson Haman, 1st Baronet (died 1728)
