= Conolly's Folly =

Monument in County Kildare, Ireland

The Conolly Folly
- Baois Uí Chongaile
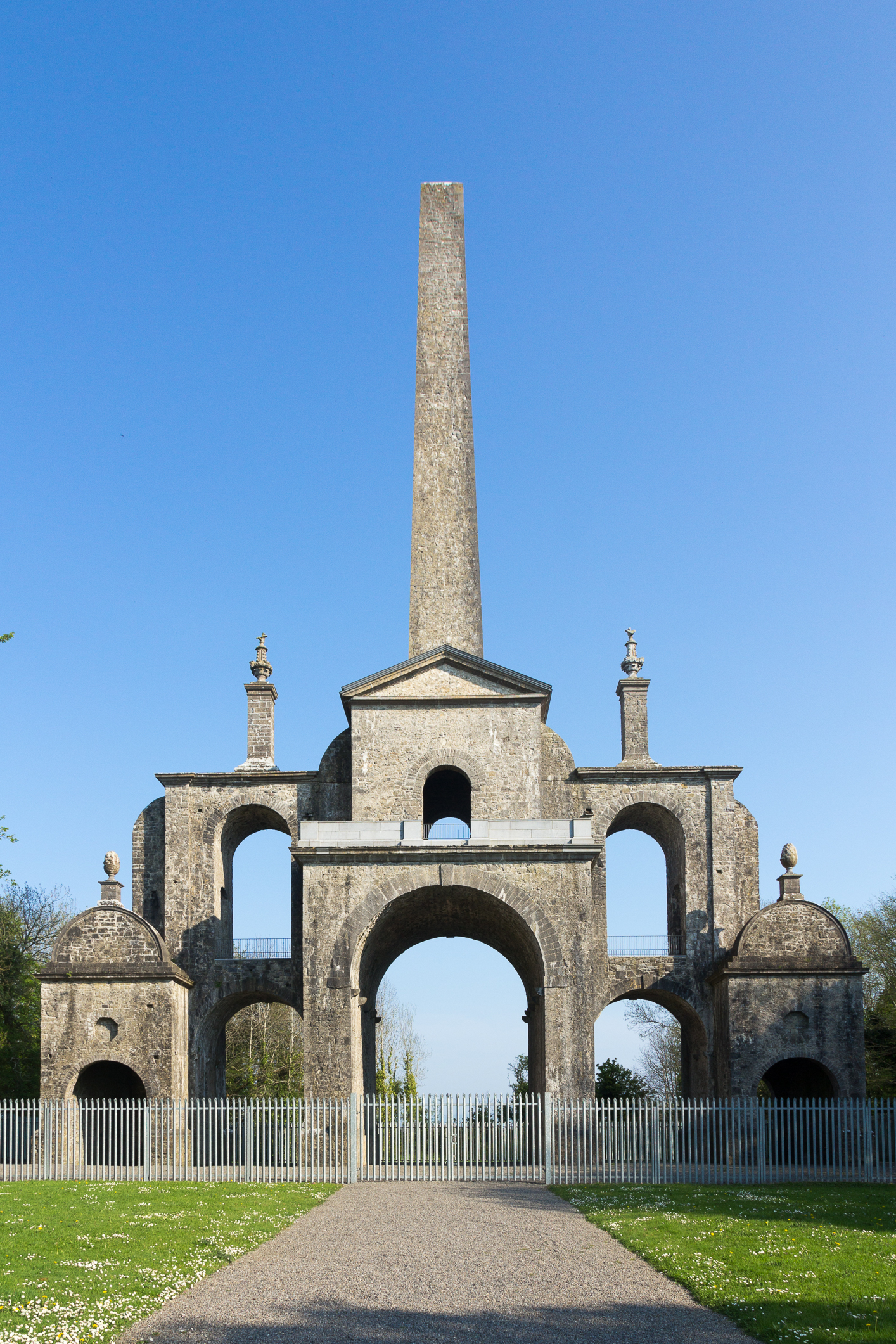
- Conolly's Folly as of May 2016
- Location: Barrogstown West, Celbridge, County Kildare, Ireland
- Coordinates: 53.3690°N 6.5605°W
- Designer: Richard Cassels
- Type: Arch structure with Obelisk
- Height: 42 m (138 ft)
- Completion date: 1740
- Dedicated to: William Conolly
- Designation: National monument (ref 681)

The Conolly Folly (Irish: Baois Uí Chonghaile), a.k.a. The Obelisk, is an obelisk structure located between Celbridge, Leixlip and Maynooth in County Kildare, Ireland. It was built in the mid-18th century by the Conolly family, then owners of the Castletown Estate. It was restored in the mid-20th century by the Irish Georgian Society, and is now a national monument in state care.

== History ==
The folly was built just outside Castletown Estate (containing Castletown House), which contains two follies, both commissioned by Katherine Conolly, the philanthropic widow of Speaker William Conolly. It was built at a cost of £400 to provide employment for the poor of Celbridge when the famine of 1740–41 was at its worst. The obelisk was built in 1740 after a particularly severe winter. As a folly, it could be seen from the back of Castletown some 4 kilometres (2.5 miles) away and it is built exactly perpendicular to the centre of the house. It was intended to mark the rear entrance gateway to Castletown house in conjunction with an avenue leading to the house.

The folly was built on land that was near to, but not on, the Conolly estate. It therefore belonged to neighbouring Carton, the home of the Fitzgerald family, Dukes of Leinster.

Designed by Richard Castle, it is 42 metres (140 feet) high and is composed of several arches, adorned by stone pineapples and eagles, topped by a massive obelisk pillar.

It was restored between 1962 and 1965 by the Irish Georgian Society (IGS), in what was the society's first major restoration project. The organisation now uses an image of the folly on its emblem. The folly, on its 5 acres of woodland, was acquired by the IGS in 1968 thanks to American donor Rose Saul Zalles. The grave of the co-founder of the society, Mariga Guinness (1932–1989), is located at the folly.

The site, which is designated as a "national monument in state ownership", is now in the care of the Office of Public Works (OPW). The OPW has erected modern fencing to protect the structure by preventing direct public access.

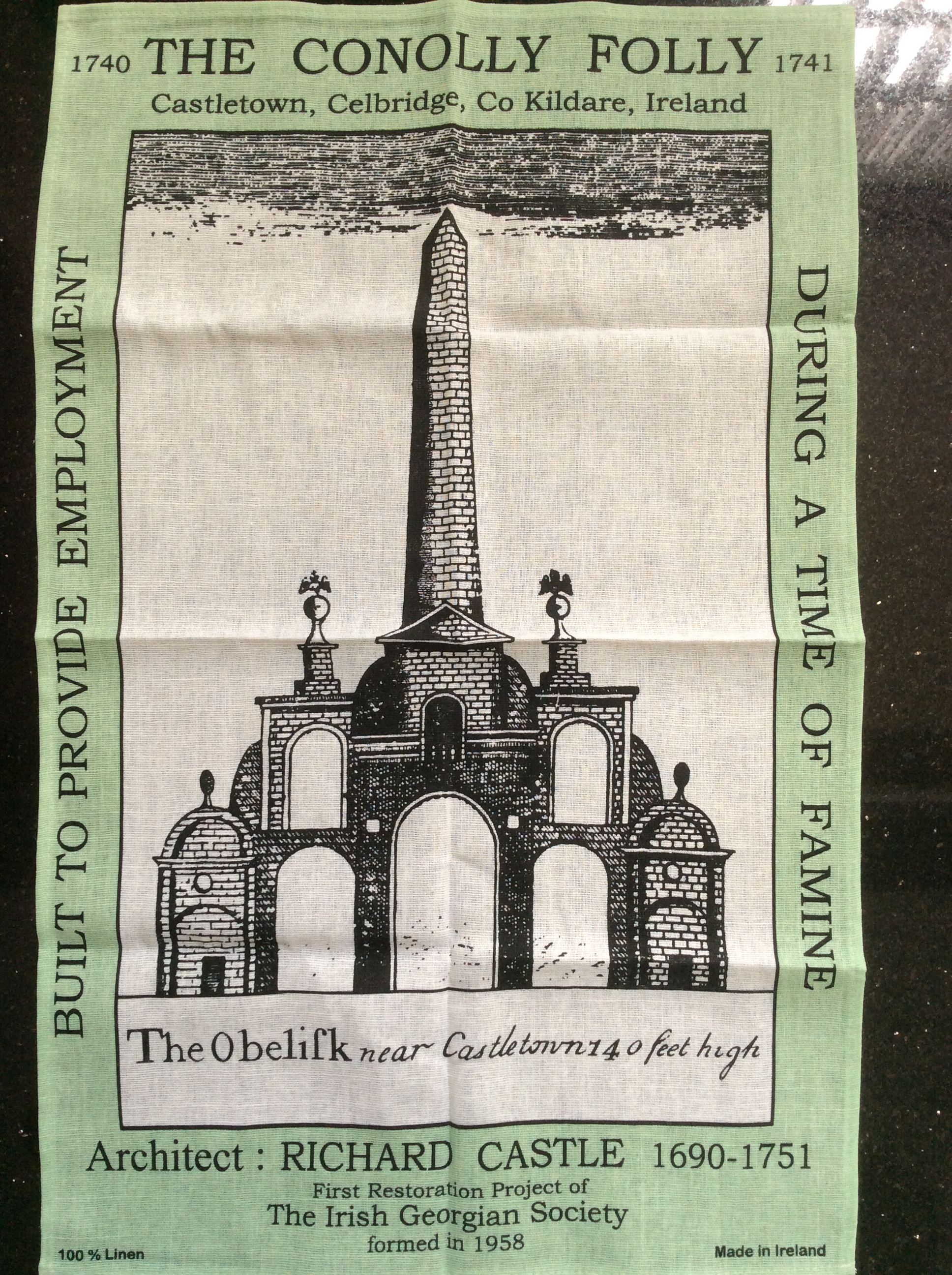
Tea towel of the Conolly Folly

== Spelling ==
The name Conolly is used, rather than the more common spelling Connolly, as it was the spelling used by William Conolly and by all his descendants. It derived from the Irish 'Ui Conghaile'.

== See also ==
- The Wonderful Barn
