= Castletown House =

Palladian country house in County Kildare, Ireland

- Teach Bhaile an Chaisleáin
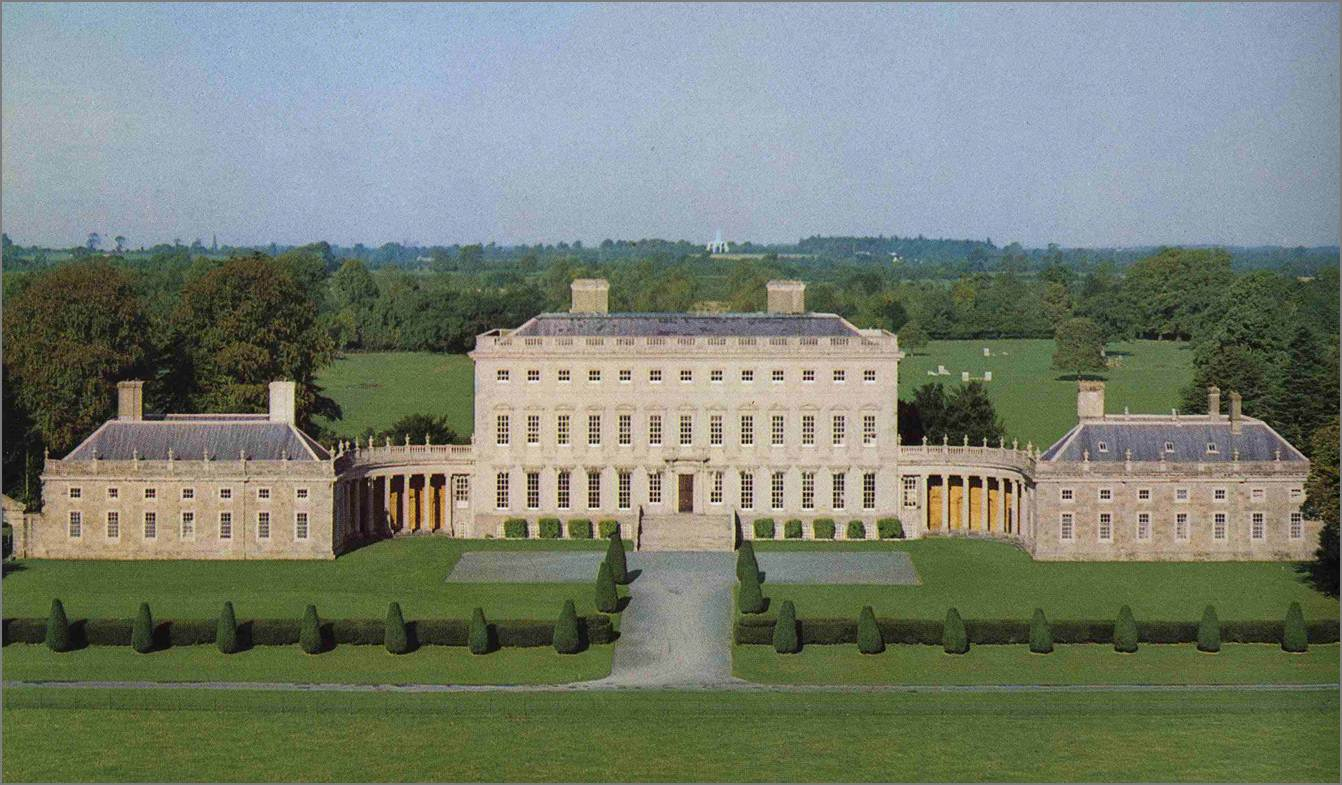

- Location within Ireland

General information
- Status: Museum
- Type: House
- Architectural style: Palladian
- Location: Celbridge; County Kildare; W23 V9H3, Ireland
- Coordinates: 53.349079°N 6.530444°W
- Elevation: 61 m (200 ft)
- Groundbreaking: 1722
- Owner: Office of Public Works

Height
- Height: 21 m (69 ft)

Technical details
- Floor count: 3
- Floor area: 4,880 m^{2} (52,500 sq ft)
- Lifts/elevators: 1
- Grounds: 220 ha (540 acres)

Design and construction
- Architects: Alessandro Galilei; Edward Lovett Pearce (wings)
- Other designers: William Chambers (1760); Simon Vierpyl (1766); Richard Cranfield (1768)

Other information
- Parking: On-site

Website
- castletown.ie

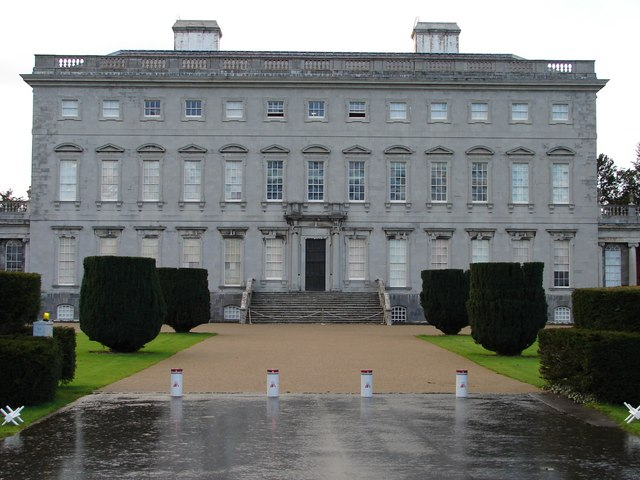
Castletown House

Castletown House, Celbridge, County Kildare, Ireland, is a Palladian house built in 1722 for William Conolly, the Speaker of the Irish House of Commons. It formed the centrepiece of an 800-acre (320 ha) estate. The estate was sold in 1965 by William Conolly-Carew, 6th Baron Carew, and later sub-divided.

The house and a core demesne of 120 acres were bought by a group of preservationists, and became the first major project of the Irish Georgian Society; they were later transferred to a dedicated charitable foundation, and ultimately to state ownership in 1994. In November 2025 the Office of Public Works acquired 235-acre (95 ha) of the remaining part of the estate in private ownership.

== Interiors ==
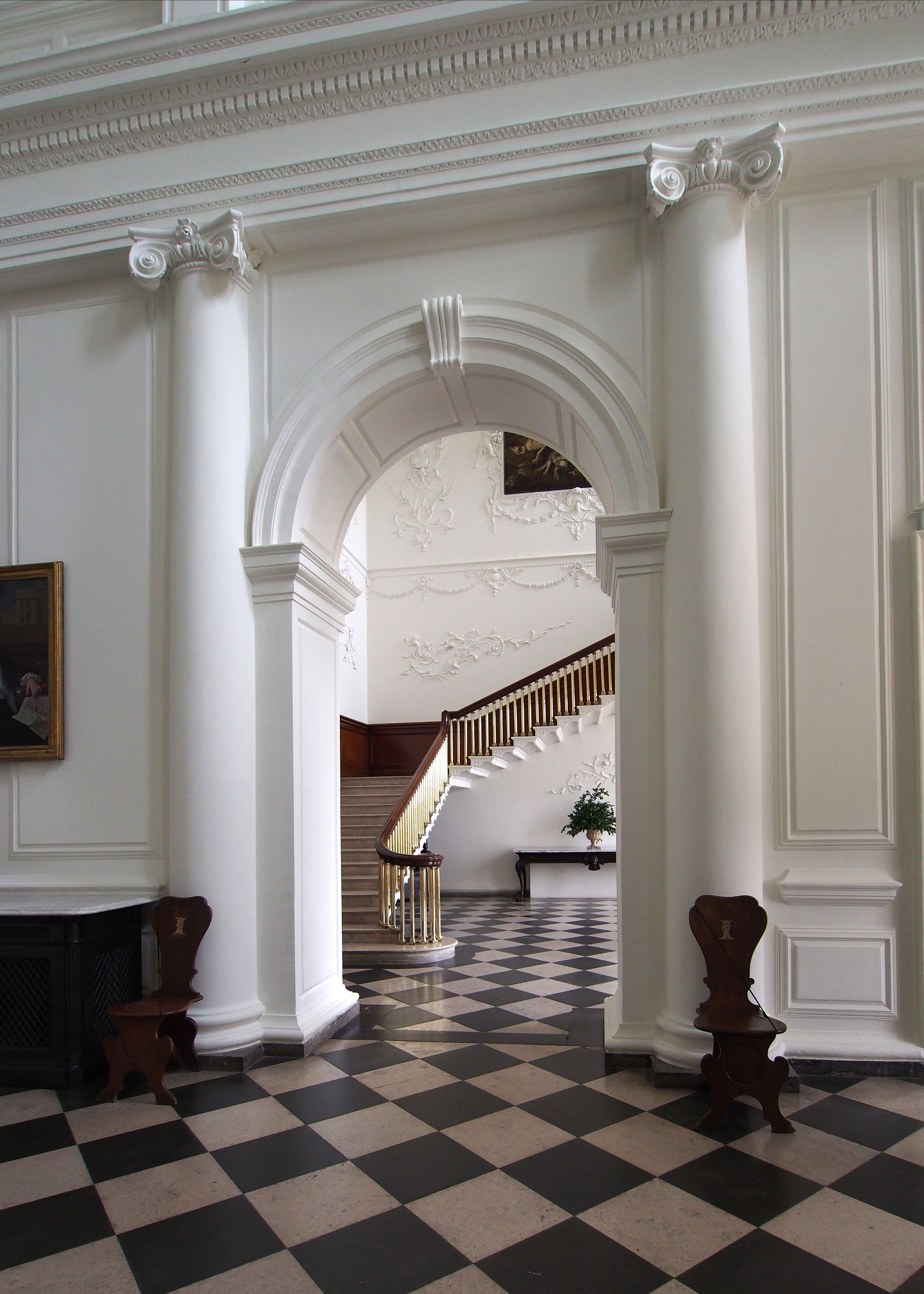

On the piano nobile there are a series of ever-grander reception rooms, typical of the 1720s. The house was entered by ascending a staircase outside before coming into a large entrance hall which was decorated with stucco gilding and pictures of the family. To the left is the dining room which was made out of two smaller rooms. To the right of the hall was the huge staircase itself. This was made of Portland stone and is cantilevered.

Straight on on the left is the Green Drawing Room, also known as the Saloon because of its position in the house. This was the room that the family used to receive their guests in before leaving and (staying on the left hand side of the house) entering the Red Drawing Room. Beyond this, the Print Room is decorated with cut-outs of favourite images, following the fashion of the 1760s. This room is on the right side and is thought to be the only surviving example of this type of room in Ireland from this period. Further on is the State Bedroom, which was never used by royalty as such, but by the various viceroys based in Dublin. In it are chairs which were from Venice.

Another feature of Castletown is the Long Gallery, an 80-foot (24 m) long room decorated in the Pompeian manner by O'Reilly in the 1770s in blue, red and gold.

== History ==
=== Early history ===
On William Conolly's death in 1729, his widow Katherine (née Conyngham) continued living in the house and hosting extravagant entertainments there until her own death in 1752. The Castletown estate then passed to Conolly's nephew William James Conolly, MP for Ballyshannon. On William James' death in 1754 it passed to his son Tom Conolly whose wife, Lady Louisa (great-granddaughter of Charles II of England and Louise de Keroualle), finished the interior decoration during the 1760s and 1770s. Lady Louisa had grown up in Carton House, within a demesne to the north-east of Castletown house. Much of the work on the interior was carried out to designs of William Chambers. Lady Louisa also ordered extensive work on the grounds; the drainage scheme through the woodland is ingenious, creating dry paths for walking on land that is below the watertable (the ha-ha fence is part of this intricate network). The paths through the forest she set out are still in walking condition although, due to anti-joyrider measures, several of the culverts have broken and the pathways are again subject to flooding.

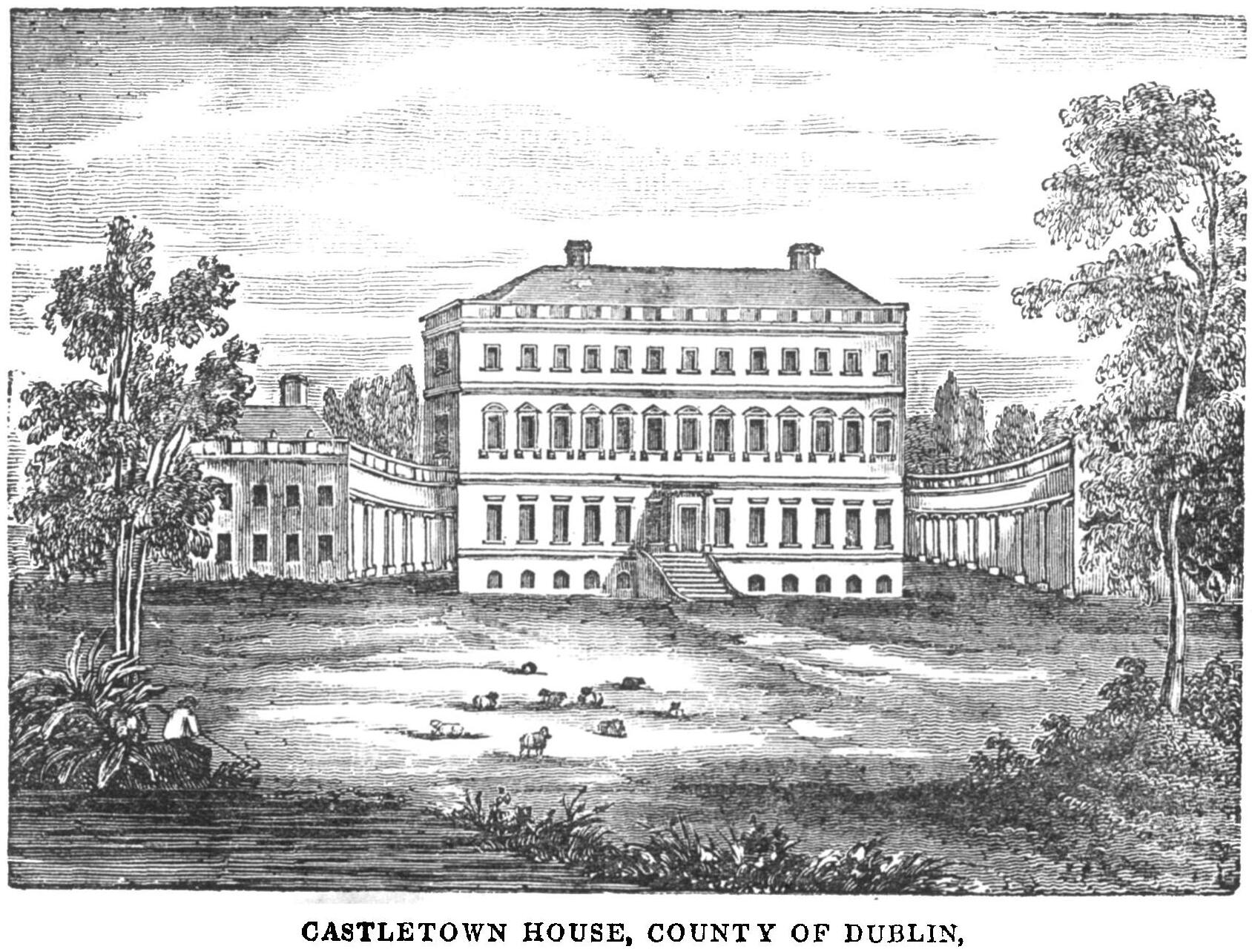
The house in 1835, Dublin Penny Journal

When Tom Conolly died in 1803, he left the estate to his wife, who on her own death in 1821 bequeathed it to her great-nephew, Edward Michael Pakenham, later the MP for County Donegal, on condition he adopted the surname of Conolly. He was succeeded by his eldest son, another Tom Conolly, the eccentric MP for Donegal from 1849 to 1876. Tom's eldest son Thomas inherited Castletown, but after he was killed in 1900 the estate passed to his brother Major Edward Conolly.

The Conolly family continued to reside in their ancestral home, later bearing the compound surname Connolly-Carew and the title Baron Carew, until 1965. That year, the 6th Baron Carew sold Castletown House—along with its contents and 580 acres of land—for £166,000. The purchasers were Julian de Lisle, a London-based property owner, businessman, and cousin of the Guinness family, and Major James Wilson, Master of the Kildare Hunt and also a cousin of de Lisle. Portions of the estate have since been sold and developed, although some original features have been preserved within the new constructions.

=== Desmond Guinness and the Castletown Foundation ===
The house was bought in 1967 by Mariga and Desmond Guinness for £93,000 to save it from vandalism, became the flagship of the Irish Georgian Society, and was eventually handed over to the newly established Castletown Foundation.

The estate was sold on in parts, with 120 acres (0.49 km^{2}) held as curtilage around the house, some small quantities retained privately by Desmond Guinness, the forested Crodaun Woods part sold to what became Coillte and around 25 acres (100,000 m^{2}) acquired over time by Kildare County Council. Most of the core estate remains as woodland or green space but a large fraction in the south west was developed as Castletown Estate, controversially approaching the main house closely, and taking in the walled garden and the orchard (the wall of which remains), which were lost. However, some other features, such as the Gazebo, the Steward's House and a mock temple, were retained, after negotiations between developer Janus Securities and the Irish Georgian Society.

=== Modern times ===
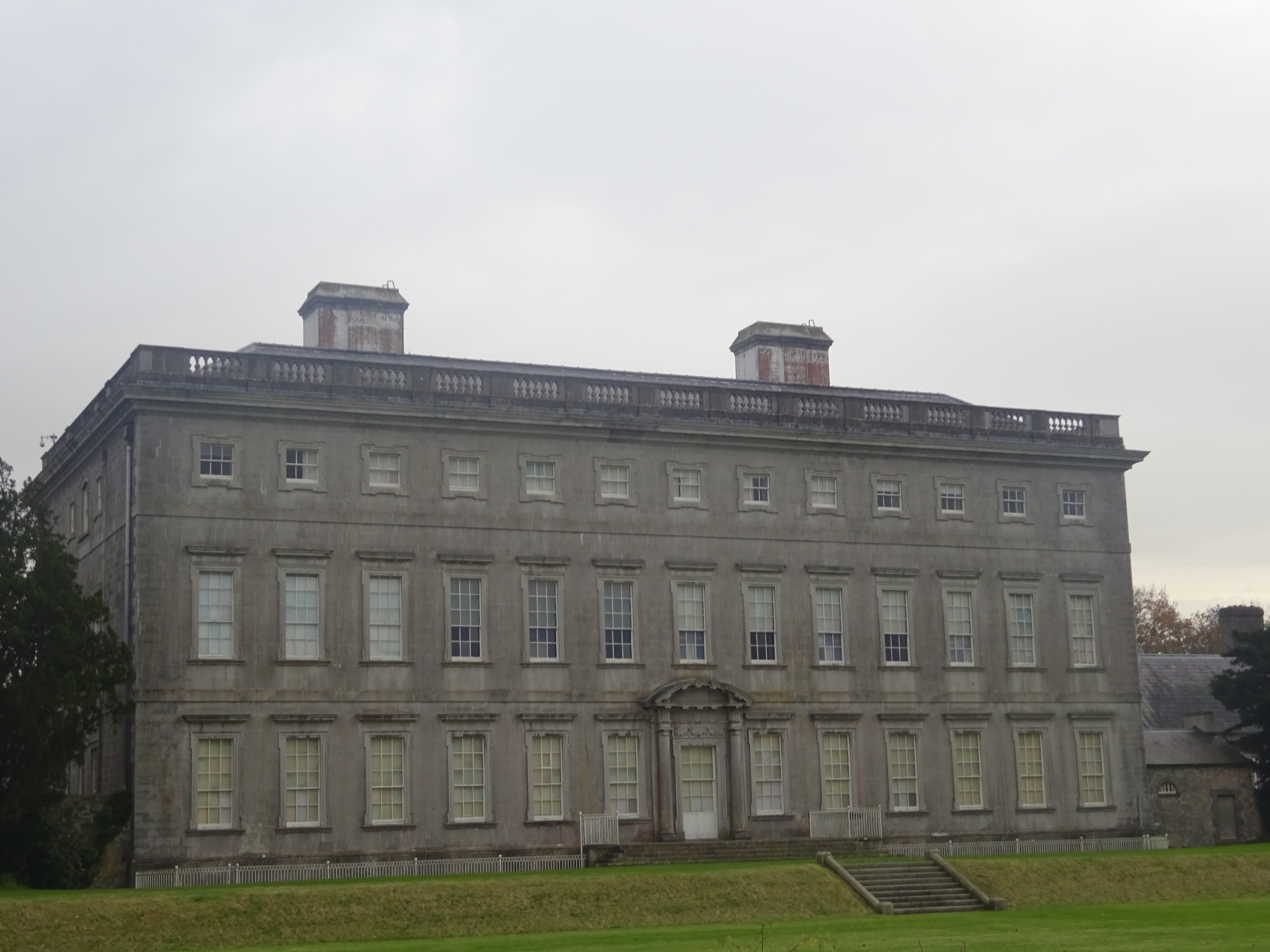
Rear (northwest) facade

The charitable Castletown Foundation struggled with the financial and operational demands of maintenance and ongoing restoration, and in 1994, following extensive negotiations between the foundation and the State, Castletown House, with its 120-acre residual demesne, was transferred to the Office of Public Works (OPW).

In 2024, the OPW acquired Donaghcumper House and ancillary lands from Kildare County Council. Located south of the river Liffey, opposite Castletown House, this purchase ensured the protection of the historic vistas to and from Castletown House. In November 2025, the Irish State purchased the remainder of the Castletown Demesne, bringing the total area of lands around the House in State ownership to 475 acres. The OPW continued the programme of restoration, of both house and lands.

Across the broader former estate, and despite the protection of the house and some estate features, at least one of the outlying features, The Gazebo, was partly demolished, without planning permission, in late 2007. An enforcement notice was served on the developer concerned, and further action was expected.

In 2012, work began to restore the lake on the lawn between Castletown House and the Liffey, and this was followed in 2016 by work on the pleasure grounds behind and to the west of the house.

Following some years of dispute over access and visitor parking, after the sale of parts of the demesne, the Office of Public Works purchased some 235 acres of land for €11.25 million, including the access from the M4 motorway. This was added to the existing 227 acres of the Castletown Demesne already in State ownership and OPW management. This purchase brought to an end the long running and bitter dispute over public and vehicular access to the estate. On 22 December 2025 full public access to the Castletown estate was restored.

== Access and rights of way ==
Access by pedestrians is possible from one end of Celbridge's main street, along the former half-mile main drive, lined with lime trees. Access by car is, since 2007, from the north beside junction 6 of the N4 / M4 motorway, with car parking near the house. In September 2023, it was announced that the vehicular entrance, and both main and disabled car parking areas, would be closing, due to disagreement between the State agency managing Castletown and the new owners of much of the remaining land, leading to active local protests. Vehicular access to the House and state from the M4 motorway was restored in December 2025 following purchase of part of the lands by the Office of Public Works.

An informal footpath runs along the river Liffey, and a second path runs from the house towards Leixlip, passing the gate lodge designed by Batty Langley.

== Current activities ==
Castletown House is available daily for tour until the 4th November 2026. Tickets can be purchases through the Heritage Ireland website.

A full cultural program is offered each year. Talks and concerts will be advertised on www.eventbrite.ie.

Castletown House has hosted various academic and artistic organisations. The first arts organisation to take up residency at Castletown House in 2007 was The Performance Corporation, a site-specific theatre company, which established an office on the premises, as well as running rehearsals for their productions, and hosting an annual international cross-artform residency programme, the "SPACE Programme".

The OPW-Maynooth University Archive and Research Centre was launched by President Mary McAleese in November 2008. It was established to facilitate the care and study of archives and other sources dealing with the history of Irish estates, their houses and inhabitants. It also facilitates research in the decorative arts. The Archive and Research Centre is located on the second floor of Castletown House.

From 2018 until 2023, a weekly 5 km parkrun took place in the parklands of Castletown house on Saturday mornings.

== See also ==
- The Wonderful Barn
- The Conolly Folly
