= John Cairnes (politician) =

Irish politician

John Cairnes was an Irish politician.

He was the son of Thomas Cairnes and his wife Jane Scott, daughter of John Scott. In 1639, Cairnes was elected as Member of Parliament for Augher, representing the constituency in the Irish House of Commons until the following year.

He married Jane Miller, daughter of James Miller. Cairnes's oldest son Alexander was created a baronet and was succeeded by his younger brother Henry. Like his second son William, both sat also in the Parliament of Ireland.
