= Cairnes Anthony Daniell =

- Born: 1834; Macau, China
- Died: 18 August 1915; Shanklin, Isle of Wight
- Occupation: Indian Civil Service

Cairnes Anthony Daniell (1834 - 18 August 1915) was a British civil servant in India, where he held several administrative posts including joint magistrate and deputy collector at Dehra Dun, judge at Gorakhpur, agent governor-general at Benares, and senior member of the Board of Revenue, North-Western Provinces (NWP).

== Early life and education ==
Cairnes Anthony Daniell was born in Macau, China in 1834, to James Nugent Daniell, of the East India Company. He was educated at Harrow School, leaving there in 1850. From 1851 to 1853 he attended Haileybury, and arrived in India the following year.

== Career ==
Daniell joined the Bengal Civil Service in March 1856, though immediately took leave due to sickness. He returned to India in January 1859 to join the NWP, where he was appointed assistant under the Commissioner at Meerut. In March of that year he was posted to Dehra Dun as assistant superintendent, and promoted to joint magistrate and deputy collector there in August 1861. In 1874 he became district and circuit judge at Gorakhpur.

From 17 October 1867 to 16 July 1869, Daniell held an administrative post at the district of Bulandshahr. In 1885 he was appointed senior member of NWP's Board of Revenue. In 1880 he was appointed agent governor-general at Benares.

Daniell retired in 1889 and settled in Shanklin, Isle of Wight, where he supported the Conservative Party. From the formation of the local Primrose League, he was its secretary and later its treasurer. He also served as Vicar's warden to St. Saviour's Church.

== Personal and family ==
He married Emma Catherine, daughter of Major Eckford. They had two sons and one daughter. As a result of an eye injury from a railway accident in India, Daniell later became totally blind.

== See also ==
- 8th Light Cavalry
