= William Elliot Cairnes =

Captain William Elliot Cairnes (18 September 1862 – 19 April 1902) was an Irish officer of the British Army and military writer.

== Early life and military career ==
Cairnes was born in Galway on 18 September 1862, to an old family of Scottish descent, the son of John Elliott Cairnes (1823–1875), an economist at Queens College Galway and University College London. He was educated at Blackheath Proprietary School and at University College, London.

In 1882, he was commissioned a lieutenant in the Militia of the Royal Irish Rifles. From the militia, he received a commission as a lieutenant in the 3rd Dragoon Guards on 14 May 1884 and was transferred to the South Staffordshire Regiment a week later, and again to the 2nd Battalion of the Royal Irish Fusiliers in July 1884. He was promoted captain on 21 May 1890. In March 1897, he was appointed Adjutant of the 1st Volunteer Battalion of the Yorkshire Light Infantry. He was Secretary to the 1902 Committee on Education and Training of Officers, and also to the Military Court of Inquiry into the Remount Department.

He died in London on 19 April 1902.

== Family ==
Cairnes married, in 1884, Mamie McClelland. They had one daughter.

== Books ==
Cairnes was the author of a number of works on military subjects, mostly written as commentaries during the Second Boer War (some was published anonymously):

- An absent minded War: Being some Reflections on our Reverses and the Causes which have led to them (1900), on the early part of the Second Boer War. This book was re-printed in 2010.
- The Army from Within (1901)
- The coming Waterloo (1901)
- Lord Roberts as a Soldier in Peace and War (1901)
