= Sir Richard Vernon, 3rd Baronet =

British diplomat and politician

Richard Vernon

British envoy to Poland
- In office 1715 – 1718 Serving with Sir Thomas Prendergast, 1st Bt (1703–1710); Sir Alexander Cairnes, 1st Bt (1710–1713)

Member of Parliament for Monaghan Borough
- In office 1703 – 1713

Personal details
- Born: 22 June 1678
- Died: 1 October 1725 (aged 47) Poland
- Military career
- Rank: Lieutenant
- Unit: 2nd Regiment of Foot Guards

Sir Richard Vernon, 3rd Baronet (22 June 1678 – 1 October 1725) was a British diplomat and politician.

He succeeded in the baronetcy in 1683, when aged only five. He was commissioned a lieutenant in the 2nd Regiment of Foot Guards on 10 November 1702, but left the regiment in 1703. He became a Member of the Irish Parliament for Monaghan Borough in 1703 and sat for it until 1713.

== Envoy to Poland ==
Vernon was subsequently dispatched as British envoy to Poland, also visiting Dresden. On his way he passed through The Hague in September 1715. The following April he travelled from Dresden to Danzig to attend the wedding between the Duke of Mecklenburg and the Tsar's niece. The following October, he passed through Berlin on his way to Gohr, returning in November. He was still in Berlin a month later, but about to go to Dresden to await the king of Poland there or go on to Poland. By October 1718, he had been superseded and returned to England.

He died in Poland in 1723 in the court of Augustus II the Strong.

Parliament of Ireland
Preceded by Charles Dering; Robert Echlin	Member of Parliament for Monaghan Borough; 1703 – 1713; With: Sir Thomas Prendergast, 1st Bt 1703–1710; Sir Alexander Cairnes, 1st Bt 1710–1713	Succeeded by Richard Pockrich; Francis Lucas
Diplomatic posts
Unknown	British envoy to Poland; 1715 – 1718	Unknown
Baronetage of England
Preceded by Thomas Vernon	Baronet; 1683–1725	Extinct
