= Cairnes baronets =

Escutcheon of the Cairnes baronets of Monaghan

The Cairnes baronetcy, of Monaghan in Ireland, was a title in the Baronetage of Great Britain. It was created on 6 May 1708 for the Irish banker and politician Alexander Cairnes, with remainder to his younger brother, Henry Cairnes. Cairnes had no surviving male issue and was succeeded according to the special remainder by his brother, the 2nd Baronet. The title became extinct on the latter's death in 1743.

== Cairnes baronets, of Monaghan (1708) ==
- Sir Alexander Cairnes, 1st Baronet (1665–1732)
- Sir Henry Cairnes, 2nd Baronet (1673–1743)

Baronetage of Great Britain
Preceded by Lloyd baronets	Cairnes baronets of Monaghan; 6 May 1708	Succeeded by De Neufville baronets
