= John Elliott Cairnes =

Irish political economist (1823–1875)

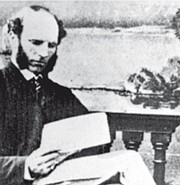
- Born: 26 December 1823; Castlebellingham, County Louth, Ireland
- Died: 8 July 1875 (aged 51); Blackheath, near London, England
- Spouse: Elizabeth Charlotte Alexander (maiden)

Academic background
- Education: Trinity College Dublin

Academic work
- Discipline: Political economy
- School or tradition: Classical economics
- Institutions: Queens College Galway; University College London

John Elliott Cairnes (26 December 1823 – 8 July 1875) was an Irish political economist. He has been described as the "last of the classical economists".

== Biography ==
John Cairnes was born at Castlebellingham, County Louth. He was the son of William Elliott Cairnes (1787–1863) of Stameen, near Drogheda, and Marianne Woolsey, whose mother was the sister of Sir William Bellingham, 1st Baronet of Castlebellingham. John's father decided upon a business career, against the wishes of his mother (Catherine Moore of Moore Hall, Killinchy), and became a partner in the Woolsey Brewery at Castlebellingham. In 1825, William Cairnes started on his own account in Drogheda, making the Drogheda Brewery an unqualified success. He was remembered for his great business capacity and for the deep interest he took in charity.

After leaving school, John Cairnes spent some years in the counting-house of his father at Drogheda. His tastes, however, lay altogether in the direction of study, and he was permitted to enter Trinity College Dublin, where he took the degree of BA in 1848, and six years later that of M.A.He was educated at Trinity College, Dublin. After passing through the curriculum of Arts, he engaged in the study of Law and was called to the Irish bar. But, he lacked a desire to pursue the legal profession, and over some ensuing years, he devoted himself to writing in various publications about social and economic questions and treatises that related to Ireland. He focused mostly on political economy, which he studied thoroughly.

While residing in Dublin, he made the acquaintance of Archbishop Whately, who conceived a very high respect for Cairnes' character and abilities. In 1856, a vacancy occurred in the chair of political economy at Dublin, founded by Whately, and Cairnes received the appointment. In accordance with the regulations of the foundation, the lectures of his first year's course were published. The book appeared in 1857 with the title Character and Logical Method of Political Economy. It followed up on and expanded J. S. Mill's treatment in the Essays on some Unsettled Questions in Political Economy, and formed an admirable introduction to the study of economics as a science. In it, the author's peculiar powers of thought and expression are displayed to the best advantage. Logical exactness, precision of language, and firm grasp of the true nature of economic facts are the qualities characteristic of this as of all his other works. If the book had done nothing more, it would still have conferred an inestimable benefit on political economists by its clear exposition of the true nature and meaning of the ambiguous term law. To the view of the province and method of political economy expounded in this early work, the author always remained true, and several of his later essays, such as those on Political Economy and Land, Political Economy and Laissez-Faire, are but reiterations of the same doctrine. His next contribution to economic science was a series of articles on the gold question, published partly in Fraser's Magazine, in which the probable consequences of the increased supply of gold attendant on the Australian and Californian gold discoveries were analysed with great skill and ability. And a critical article on M. Chevaliers' work, On the Probable Fall in the Value of Gold, appeared in the Edinburgh Review for July 1860.

In 1861, Cairnes was appointed to the professorship of jurisprudence and political economy in Queens College Galway, and in the following year he published his admirable work The Slave Power, one of the finest specimens of applied economic philosophy. The inherent disadvantages of the employment of slave labour were exposed with great fulness and ability, and the conclusions arrived at have taken their place among the recognised doctrines of political economy. The opinions expressed by Cairnes as to the probable issue of American Civil War were largely verified by the actual course of events, and the appearance of the book had a marked influence on the attitude taken by serious political thinkers in England towards the Confederate States of America.

During the remainder of his residence at Galway, Professor Cairnes published nothing beyond some fragments and pamphlets, mainly upon Irish questions. The most valuable of these papers is the series devoted to the consideration of university education. His health, at no time very good, was still further weakened in 1865 by a fall from his horse. He was ever afterwards incapacitated from active exertion and was constantly liable to have his work interfered with by attacks of illness. In 1866, he was appointed professor of political economy at University College London. He was compelled to spend the session 1868–1869 in Italy, but on his return continued to lecture until 1872. During his last session, he conducted a mixed class, with ladies being admitted to his lectures. His health soon rendered it impossible for him to discharge his public duties; he resigned from his post in 1872 and retired with the honorary title of professor emeritus of political economy. In 1873, his own university conferred on him the degree of LL.D. He died at Blackheath, near London, on 8 July 1875.

== Family ==
Cairnes, on 27 November 1860, married Elizabeth ("Eliza") Charlotte Alexander (maiden; 1838–1896) in Galway at the St. Nicholas Collegiate Church. She was the daughter of George Henry Minto Alexander (1811–1853), a Judge of the High Court in India. John and Eliza Cairnes had four children, a daughter and three sons, one being William Elliot Cairnes (1862–1902), an officer and writer. John and Eliza named their second son, Robert Gould Cairnes (1863–1868), after Robert Gould Shaw (1837–1863), a Union Army Civil War hero.

== Work ==
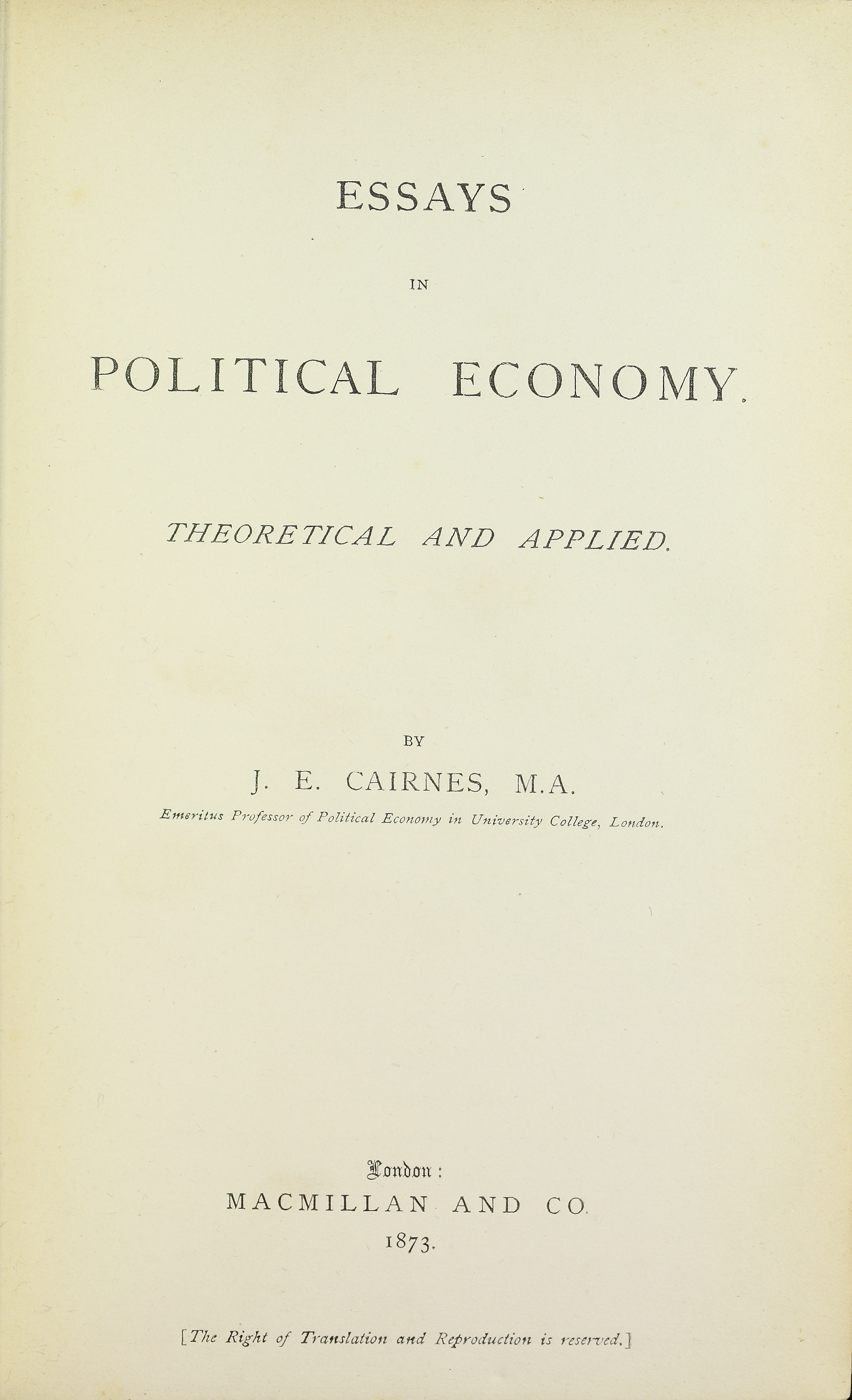
Essays in political economy (1873)

The last years of Cairnes' life were spent in the collection and publication of some scattered papers, contributing to various reviews and magazines, and in the preparation of his most extensive and important work. The Political Essays, published in 1873, comprise all his papers relating to Ireland and its university system, together with some other articles of a somewhat similar nature. The Essays in Political Economy, Theoretical and Applied, which appeared in the same year, contain the essays towards a solution of the gold question, brought up to date and tested by comparison with statistics of prices. Among the other articles in the volume, the more important are the criticisms on Frédéric Bastiat and Auguste Comte, and the essays on Political Economy and Land, and on Political Economy and Laissez-Faire, which have been referred to above. In 1874, appeared his largest work, Some Leading Principles of Political Economy, newly Expounded, which is beyond doubt a worthy successor to the great treatises of Adam Smith, Thomas Malthus, David Ricardo and John Stuart Mill. It does not expound a completed system of political economy; many important doctrines are left untouched; and in general, the treatment of problems is not such as would be suited for a systematic manual. The work is essentially a commentary on some of the principal doctrines of the English school of economists, such as value, cost of production, wages, labour and capital, and international values, and is replete with keen criticism and lucid illustration. While in fundamental harmony with Mill, especially as regards the general conception of the science, Cairnes differs from him to a greater or lesser extent on nearly all the cardinal doctrines, subjects his opinions to a searching examination, and generally succeeds in giving to the truth that is common to both a firmer basis and a more precise statement. The last labour to which he devoted himself was a republication of his first work on the Logical Method of Political Economy.

Taken as a whole, the works of Cairnes formed the most important contribution to economic science made by the English school since the publication of J. S. Mill's Principles. It is not possible to indicate more than generally the special advances in economic doctrine effected by him, but the following points may be noted as establishing for him a claim to a place beside Ricardo and Mill.

Cairnes' exposition of the province and method of political economy: He never suffers it to be forgotten that political economy is a science and, consequently, that its results are entirely neutral with respect to social facts or systems. It has simply to trace the necessary connections among the phenomena of wealth and dictates no rules for practice. Further, he is distinctly opposed both to those who would treat political economy as an integral part of social philosophy, and to those who have attempted to express economic facts in quantitative formulae and to make economy a branch of applied mathematics. According to him political economy is a mixed science, its field being partly mental, partly physical. It may be called a positive science, because its premises are facts, but it is hypothetical in so far as the laws it lays down are only approximately true, i.e. are only valid in the absence of counteracting agencies.

From this view of the nature of the science, it follows at once that the method to be pursued must be that called by Mill the physical or concrete deductive, which starts from certain known causes, investigates their consequences and verifies or tests the result by comparison with facts of experience. It may, perhaps, be thought that Cairnes gives too little attention to the effects of the organism of society on economic facts, and that he is disposed to overlook what Walter Bagehot called the postulates of political economy.

Cairnes' analysis of cost of production in its relation to value: According to Mill, the universal elements in cost of production are the wages of labour and the profits of capital. To this theory, Cairnes objects that wages, being remuneration, can in no sense be considered as cost, and could only have come to be regarded as cost in consequence of the whole problem being treated from the point of view of the capitalist, to whom, no doubt, the wages paid represent cost. The real elements of cost of production he looks upon as labour, abstinence and risk, the second of these falling mainly, though not necessarily, upon the capitalist. In this analysis, he, to a considerable extent, follows and improves upon Nassau William Senior, who had previously defined cost of production as the sum of the labour and abstinence necessary to production.

Cairnes' exposition of the natural or social limit to free competition, and of its bearing on the theory of value: He points out that in any organised society, there can hardly be the ready transference of capital from one employment to another, which is the indispensable condition of free competition; while class distinctions render it impossible for labour to transfer itself readily to new occupations. Society may thus be regarded as consisting of a series of non-competing industrial groups, with free competition among the members of any one group or class. Now, the only condition under which cost of production will regulate value is perfect competition. It follows that the normal value of commodities-the value which gives to the producers the average and usual remuneration will depend upon cost of production only when the exchange is confined to the members of one class, among whom there is free competition. In exchange between classes or non-competing industrial groups, the normal value is simply a case of international value, and depends upon reciprocal demand, that is to say, is such as will satisfy the equation of demand. This theory is a substantial contribution to economic science and throws great light upon the general problem of value. At the same time, it may be thought that Cairnes overlooked a point brought forward prominently by Senior, who also had called attention to the bearing of competition on the relation between cost of production and value. The cost to the producer fixes the limit below which the price cannot fall without the supply being affected; but it is the desire of the consumer-i.e. what he is willing to give up rather than be compelled to produce the commodity for himself that fixes the maximum value of the article. To treat the whole problem of natural or normal value from the point of view of the producer is to give but a one-sided theory of the facts.

Cairnes' defence of the wages fund doctrine: This doctrine, expounded by Mill in his Principles, had been relinquished by him, but Cairnes still undertook to defend it. He certainly succeeded in removing from the theory much that bad tended to obscure its real meaning and in placing it in its very best aspect. He also showed the sense in which, when treating the problem of wages, we must refer to some fund devoted to the payment of wages, and pointed out the conditions under which the wages fund may increase or decrease. It may be added that his Leading Principles contain admirable discussions on trade unions and protection, together with a clear analysis of the difficult theory of international trade and value, in which there is much that is both novel and valuable. The Logical Method contains an exposition and defence of Ricardo's theory of rent, and the Essays contain a criticism of Frédéric Bastiat's economic doctrines.

His legacy lives on today at the University of Galway with the J.E. Cairnes School of Business & Economics named after him.

== Selected extant publications ==
=== Articles, lectures, papers ===
1. Dublin Statistical Society, papers:
  1. "On the Best Means of Raising the Supplies for a War Expenditure," read to the Society 20 March 1854
  2. An Examination Into the Principles of Currency Involved in the Bank Charter Act of 1844, read to the Society 19 June 1854
2. Journal of the Dublin Statistical Society
  1. "The Effect of War on Prices," Vol. 1, No. 4, April 1856, pps. 223–238
  2. "The Laws according to which a depreciation of the precious metals consequent upon an increase of supply takes place, considered in connection with recent gold discoveries," Vol. 2, No. 1, January 1859, pps. 236–269
3. Fraser's Magazine
  1. "Essay Towards an Experimental Solution to the Gold Question," Vol. 60, September 1859, pps. 267–278
  2. "Essay Towards a Solution to the Gold Question" (2^{nd} paper), Vol. 61, January 1860, pps. 38–53
4. Edinburgh Review
  1. "Review of Chevalier's 1859 book, (← article link/book link →) On the Probable Fall in the Value of Gold," (re: Michel Chevalier) (book review), Vol. 112, No. 227, July 1860, pps. 1–33
  2. "Ireland" (Cairne's authorship was anonymous), Vol. 119, January to April 1864, pps. 279–304
5. The Slave Power: Its Character, Career, and Probable Designs: Being an Attempt to Explain the Real Issues Involved in the American Contest (1862; 2^{nd} ed., 1862)
6. Dublin YMCA in connection with the United Church of England and Ireland
  1. "The Revolution in America: A Lecture" (1862; 7^{th} ed., 1863)
  2. "Colonization and Colonial Government: A Lecture," presented in the Metropolitan Hall, 26 October 1864
7. "Estrangement Between the United States and Great Britain," 1862, London Anti-Slavery Advocate (repr. Living Age, Third Series, Vol. 19, 1962, pps. 328–330)
8. The Southern Confederacy and the African Slave Trade, A correspondence between Prof. Cairnes and George McHenry (1824–1880) (1863):
  McHenry was a pro-Confederate export merchant from Philadelphia who authored in 1863, The Cotton Trade
9. "Notes on the State of Ireland" (an 1864 essay on the agrarian conditions of Ireland, prepared for John Stuart Mill's 1865 6^{th} ed. of Principals)
10. The Economist
  1. "Irish Education" (letter to the editor), Vol. 23, No. 1147, 19 August 1965, pps. 1000–1002
  2. "Ireland in Transition" (series on Cottierism)
    1. "Ireland in Transition," Vol. 23, No. 1150, 9 September 1865, pps. 1087–1088
    2. "Free Trade," Vol. 23, No. 1151, 16 September 1865, pps. 1116–1117
    3. "Ireland in Transition," Vol. 23, No. 1150, 30 September 1865, pps. 1173–1175
    4. "The Decline of Cottierism," Vol. 23, No. 1152, 7 October 1865, pps. 1204–1205
    5. "The Irish Cottier," Vol. 23, No. 1152, 21 October 1865, pps. 1146–1147
    6. "Peasant Proprietorship," Vol. 23, No. 1158, 4 November 1865, pps. 1333–1334
  3. "The 'Law' of Demand and Supply" (in two parts) (re: supply and demand)
    1. Vol. 24, No. 1208, 20 October 1866, pps. 1221–1222
    2. Vol. 24, No. 1210, 3 November 1866, pps. 1279–1281
11. Fortnightly Review, volumes numbered by New Series
  1. "Bastiat" (re: Frédéric Bastiat), Vol. 12, No. 46, May 1870, pps. 411–428
  2. "Political Economy and Land," Vol. 12, 1 January – 1 June 1870, p. 41–63
  3. "M. Comte and Political Economy" (re: Auguste Comte; 1798–1855), Vol. 41, 1 May 1870, p. 579
  4. "A Note" (on Frederic Harrison), Vol. 44, 1 August 1870, pps. 246–247
  5. "Political Economy and Laissez-Faire" (re: laissez-faire), Vol. 10, 1 January – 1 June 1871, pps. 80–97
  6. "Our Defences: A National or Standing Army?" Vol. 9, 1 January – 1 June 1871, pps. 167–198
  7. "New Theories of Political Economy," Vol. 11, 1 January – 1 June 1872, pps. 71–76
  8. "Froude's Irish History" (re: James Anthony Froude), Vol. 92, 1 August 1874, p. 171
  9. Herbert Spencer on Social Evolution
    1. "Mr. Spencer on Social Evolution," Vol. 17, 1 January 1875, pps. 63–82
    2. "Mr. Spencer on the Study of Sociology," Vol. 17, 1 January – 1 June 1875, pps. 200–213
12. John Stuart Mill, His Life and Works: Twelve Sketches, James R. Osgood and Company (1873)
  8. "His Work in Political Economy," by Cairnes, pps. 65–73
13. Some Leading Principles of Political Economy, Newly Expounded (1874)
14. Macmillan's Magazine
  1. "England's Neutrality in the American Contest – Regarded from the Federal Point of View," Vol. 9, No. 51, January 1864, pps. 260–272
    Reprint with additions by the Emancipation Society, 1864
  2. "The Negro Suffrage," Vol. 12, No. 68, August 1865, pps. 334–343
  3. "Woman Suffrage – A Reply" (to Mr. Goldwin Smith), Vol. 30, No. 179, September 1874, pps. 377–388
    Excerpts re-printed in The New York Times, Vol. 14, No. 7182, 23 September 1874, p. 3
15. "Woman Suffrage as Affecting the Family," Popular Science Monthly, November 1874, pps. 87–90

=== Compilations, reprints ===
1. The Character and Logical Method of Political Economy – "Being a course of lectures delivered in the Hilary term, 1857," by Cairnes, Whatley Professor of Political Economy, Trinity College Dublin (1857; 2^{nd} ed., 1875)
1. "Of the Character, Objects, and Limits of Political Economy"
2. "Of the Mental and Physical Premises of Political Economy, and of the Logical Character of the Doctrines thence deduced"
3. "Of the Logical Method of Political Economy"
4. "Of the Solution of an Economic Problem, and of the degree of perfection of which it is suspectible"
5. "Of the Malthusian Doctrine of Population" (re: Thomas Robert Malthus)
6. "Of the Theory of Rent"
7. Appendix A
8. Appendix B
9. Appendix C
Essays in Political Economy – Theoretical and Applied, 1873

"Essays Towards a Solution of the Gold Question"

"Introductory"

1. "The Australian Episode" (re: Australian gold rushes)
  "Postscript"
2. "The Course of Depreciation"
3. "International Results"
4. "Summary of the Movement – M. Chevalier's Views"
  "Postscript"
5. "Co-Operation in the Slate Quarries of North Wales" (re: Slate industry in Wales)
6. "Political Economy and Land"
  "Note"
7. "Political Economy and Laissez-Faire"
8. "M. Comte and Political Economy"
  "Note"
9. "Bastait" (re: Frédéric Bastiat)
Political Essays, 1873
1. "Colonization and Colonial Government"
2. "The Revolution in America"
3. "International Law"
4. "Fragments on Ireland"
  1. "The Agricultural Revolution – Protection and Free Trade"
  2. "The Emigration"
  3. "The Irish Cottier"
  4. "The Landlordism"
5. "Our Defences: A National or a Standing Army?"
6. "Thoughts on University Reform d-propos of the Irish Educational Crisis of 1865–6"
  "Notes"
7. "The Present Position of the Irish University Question; 1873" (re: Irish University Bill)

== See also ==
- History of economic thought
