= Sir Thomas Prendergast, 1st Baronet =

British Army general

Brigadier-General Sir Thomas Prendergast Bt MP

Member of Parliament for Monaghan Borough
- In office 1703–1709 Serving with Sir Richard Vernon, 3rd Bt
- Preceded by: Charles Dering; Robert Echlin
- Succeeded by: Sir Alexander Cairnes, 1st Bt; Sir Richard Vernon, 3rd Bt

Personal details
- Born: Thomas Prendergast c. 1660 Croane, County Limerick
- Died: 11 September 1709 (aged 48–49) Malplaquet, Artois, France
- Spouse: Penelope Cadogan (m. 1697)
- Relations: John Prendergast-Smyth, 1st Viscount Gort (grandson)
- Children: Sir Thomas Prendergast, 2nd Baronet
- Parent(s): Thomas Prendergast; Eleanor Condon

Military service
- Rank: Brigadier-General
- Battles/wars: Battle of Oudenarde; Battle of Malplaquet

Brigadier-General Sir Thomas Prendergast, 1st Baronet (c. 1660 – 11 September 1709) was an Irish politician and soldier.

== Early life ==
He was the son of Thomas Prendergast (d. 1725) of Croane, County Limerick, a small Catholic landowner, and Eleanor Condon, daughter of Daniel Condon. Eleanor was related to the Butler family. Little is known of his early life.

His family suffered greatly under Oliver Cromwell, and he is thought to have grown up in poverty. Jonathan Swift, who detested him, called him the son of a cottager who narrowly escaped being hanged for stealing cows. However, his friends esteemed him as a man of honour and ability.

== Career ==
On 15 July 1699 he was created a baronet, of Gort, in the County of Galway. He received his baronetage for informing King William III of the Jacobite plot to ambush the King's coach at Turnham Green. The plot had been conceived by Sir George Barclay, who landed at Romney in January 1696 intent upon assassinating the King. Prendergast was called upon on Thursday 13 February 1696 by Captain George Porter, one of the forty-odd conspirators, to stop the coach on Saturday 15 February. However, on the Friday he went to Whitehall and informed the Earl of Portland of the conspiracy. A man named Fisher had already reported the planned assassination but the plot was taken seriously only after Prendergast's account. It was made known on the Saturday morning that the King would not be driving to Richmond, and so the plotters postponed the assassination until the following Saturday 21 February. Another informer, De La Rue, revealed the plot but the King wanted confirmation from Prendergast, whom he felt he could trust and rely on. On the morning of the plot, the conspirators heard that guards had been dispatched but soon most of them had been rounded up and were eventually charged, thanks mainly to the testimonies of Prendergast.

He was rewarded with a grant from the Treasury and the Gort Estate in County Galway, which was confiscated from the O'Shaughnessy family. This, and his marriage to Penelope Cadogan, enabled his family's fortunes to grow, although the O'Shaughnessy family did not give up easily, and litigation over the right to Gort went on for fifty years. He became a Member of Parliament for Monaghan Borough in 1703, and rose to the rank of Brigadier-General, seeing action at the Battle of Oudenarde and finally being killed at the Battle of Malplaquet on 11 September 1709 whilst leading his regiment against the French troops at Blaregnies.

Fighting against him at both of the latter battles was William O'Shaughnessy of the O'Shaughnessy family whose ancestral lands of the Gort Estate in County Galway were forfeited and regranted to Thomas Prendergast, leading to decades of litigation.

== Personal life ==
On 10 August 1697 he married Penelope Cadogan (d. 1746), sister of William Cadogan, 1st Earl Cadogan, and daughter of Henry Cadogan and Bridget Waller. Together, they were the parents of a son and three daughters:

- Sir Thomas Prendergast, 2nd Baronet (1702–1760), who married Anne Williams, daughter of Sir Griffith Williams, 6th Baronet, in 1739.
- Elizabeth Prendergast, who married Sir John Dickson Haman, 1st Baronet, and, secondly, Charles Smyth, parents of John Prendergast-Smyth, 1st Viscount Gort.
- Anne Prendergast, who married Samuel Hobson, Esq. of Muckridge House, Youghal.
- Juliana Prendergast (d. 1758), who married Chaworth Brabazon, 6th Earl of Meath.

On his death at the Battle of Malplaquet, he was succeeded by his son Sir Thomas Prendergast, 2nd Baronet. His widow was greatly troubled in her later years by protracted lawsuits against the Butler family of Ballyline over the right to certain lands in County Galway, and several other lawsuits, including one involving her own brother. Jonathan Swift, a bitter personal enemy of the younger Thomas, extended his hatred to the elder: "him who shamed our isle, traitor, assassin and informer vile". This appears to be a garbled reference to the Assassination Plot.

Parliament of Ireland
Preceded by Charles Dering; Robert Echlin	Member of Parliament for Monaghan Borough; 1703–1709; With: Sir Richard Vernon, 3rd Bt	Succeeded by Sir Alexander Cairnes, 1st Bt; Sir Richard Vernon, 3rd Bt
Baronetage of Ireland
New creation	Baronet (of Gort); 1699–1709	Succeeded by Thomas Prendergast
