= Henry Cairnes =

Irish politician and merchant

Sir Henry Cairnes, 2nd Baronet (1673 – 16 June 1743) was an Irish politician, a banker and merchant in London and a baronet in the Baronetage of Great Britain.

He was the third and youngest son of John Cairnes and his wife Jane Miller, daughter of James Miller. On 30 October 1732, according to a special remainder, he succeeded his oldest brother Alexander as baronet. Another brother was William Cairnes. In 1732, Cairnes entered the Irish House of Commons for Monaghan Borough, the same constituency Alexander had represented before, and sat for it until his death in 1743.

On 10 July 1711, he married Frances Gould, daughter of John Gould, his brother's brother-in-law and a Director of the East India Company, at St Peter le Poer in London. He died childless on 16 June 1743 and with his death the baronetcy became extinct. His will was proven on 24 August 1745.

His widow died on 8 March 1750 and was buried 3 days later at Putney.

Parliament of Ireland
| Preceded by Francis Lucas; Sir Alexander Cairnes, Bt | Member of Parliament for Monaghan Borough; 1732–1743; With: Francis Lucas | Succeeded by Francis Lucas; John Dawson |
Baronetage of Great Britain
| Preceded by Alexander Cairnes | Baronet (of Monaghan); 1732–1743 | Extinct |
