= Katherine Conolly =

Irish political hostess

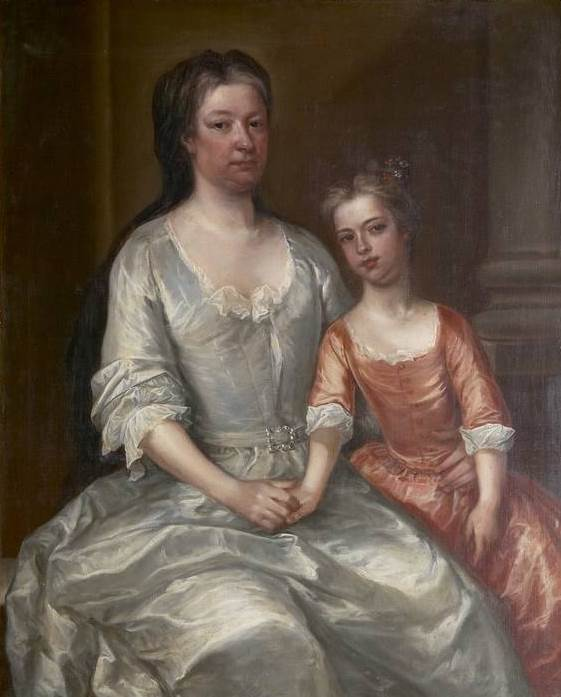
- Painting by Charles Jervas
- Born: Katherine Conyngham c.1662
- Died: 23 September 1752 (aged 89–90); Castletown House, County Kildare

Katherine Conolly (c.1662 – 1752) was an Irish political hostess, landowner, and philanthropist.

== Life ==
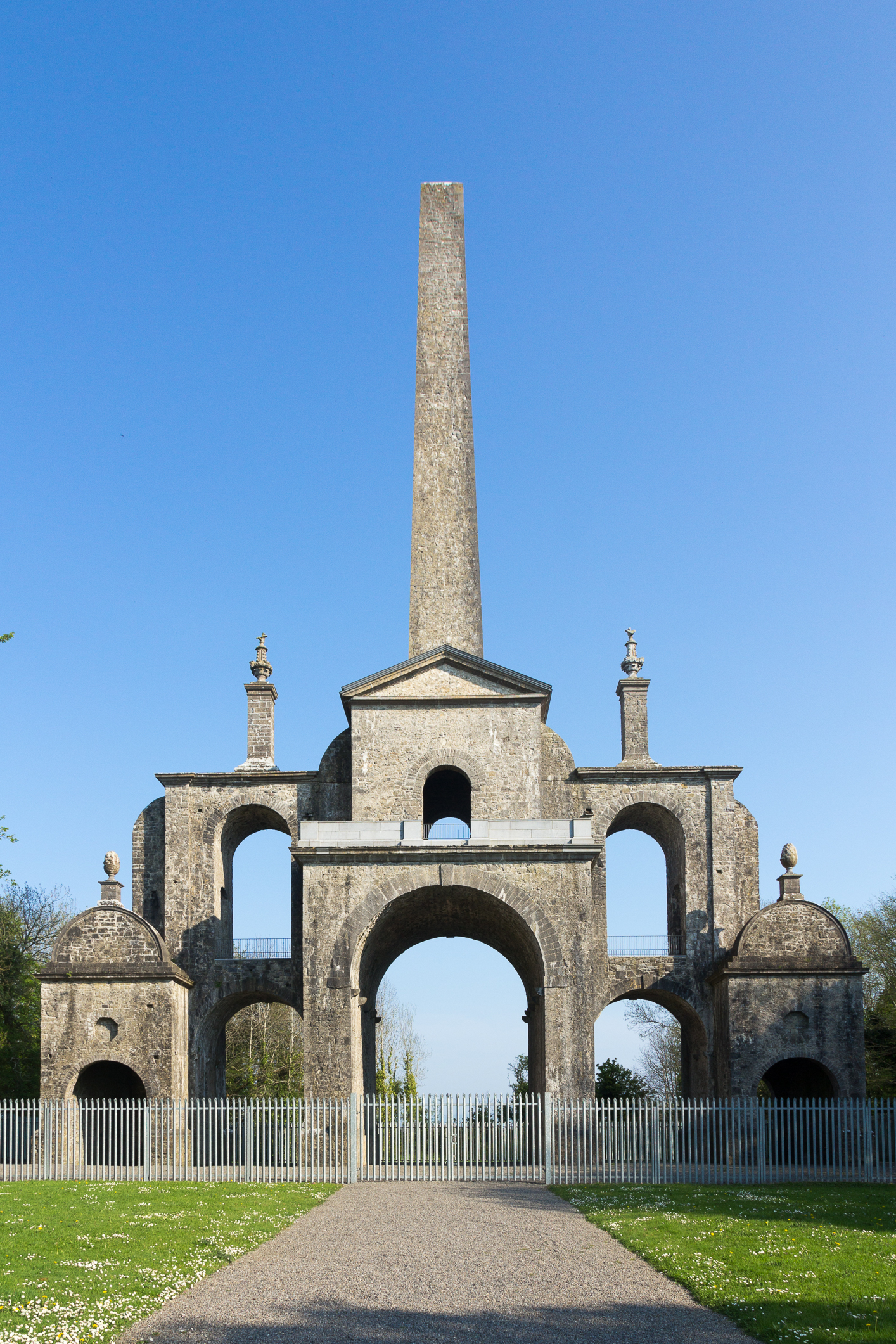
Conolly's Folly

Katherine Conolly was born Katherine Conyngham around 1662. Her parents were Sir Albert Conyngham and Margaret (née Leslie). She was the eldest of their 10 children, with one of her brothers being Henry Conyngham. Her maternal grandfather was Henry Leslie. She married William Conolly in 1694, a speaker of the Irish House of Commons and purported to be the wealthiest man in Ireland. The marriage was likely to have been a love match. The couple used her dowry of £2,300 to purchase their first estates in County Meath. Through her connections, her husband was able to ally himself with the influential protestant families such as the Gores, Montgomerys and Leslies. She became known as a political hostess, gaining a mention in a ballad detailing the 1723 Westmeath by-election.

Upon the death of her husband in 1729, Connolly inherited estates in Wales, as well as in counties Meath, Roscommon, Westmeath and Kildare. She continued to be influential in Irish public affairs, being asked for her opinions and counsel. Living on Capel Street, Dublin and at Castletown House, County Kildare, she entertained a large circle of friends. She carried on her husband's plan to build the residential Collegiate School, Celbridge, built from 1733 to 1737, then supported the school with £50 each year. She commissioned a monument in her husband's memory by Thomas Carter, in Kildrought church, Celbridge. She also commissioned Conolly's Folly in 1740 and The Wonderful Barn in 1743 to generate employment in the area.

Connolly died in Castletown House on 23 September 1752. A portrait of her by Charles Jervas still hangs there. Upon hearing of her death, Mary Delany noted:

is a general loss. Her table was open to all her friends of all ranks, and her purse to the poor ... she was clever at business, and wrote all her own letters ... she was a plain and vulgar woman in her manner, but had very valuable qualities.
