= Thomas Beecher =

Irish politician & soldier (1640–1709)

Colonel Thomas Be(e)cher JP (1640 – 10 October 1709) was an Irish politician and soldier. The family's surname varies in its spelling, caused by its pronunciation.

== Background ==
Born in Baltimore, County Cork, he was the son of Major Henry Becher and his wife Elizabeth, daughter of Thomas Notte. His paternal grandfather Henry was Lord President of Munster. The elder Henry married Mary Lyon, daughter of William Lyon, Bishop of Cork, Cloyne and Ross. Becher was educated at Trinity College, Dublin and graduated in 1658.

== Career ==
Becher was nominated a Justice of the Peace in 1665, assigned to County Cork. He fought in the Battle of the Boyne in 1690, serving as aide-de-camp to William of Orange, for which he was awarded a watch by the later King. In 1692, he was appointed Governor of Sherkin Island. Later in that year he entered the Irish House of Commons, having stood for Baltimore. He was returned for the constituency until his death in 1709. In Parliament he supported Henry Capell, 1st Baron Capell of Tewkesbury, at that time the Lord Deputy of Ireland.

Signature of Thomas Becher 1702

== Family and legacy ==
In 1665, he married Elizabeth Turner, daughter of Henry Turner; they had fifteen children, nine sons and six daughters. Becher died in 1709 and was buried at St Matthew's Church in Aughadown. Elizabeth died about 1720, her will being dated 26 September was proved in the prerogative court in Cork in the following year. His son Michael sat also in the Parliament of Ireland, representing the same constituency as his father.

Surviving letters are held by the Bristol Archives. Notable descendants were the social reformer John Thomas Becher (1769–1848), a friend of the poet Lord Byron as well as Anne Becher (1792–1864), the mother of William Makepeace Thackeray.

== Notes ==
Parliament of Ireland
Preceded by Patriot Parliament	Member of Parliament for Baltimore; 1692–1709; With: Edward Richardson 1692–1703; Percy Freke 1703–1707; Edward Riggs 1707–1709	Succeeded by Francis Langston; Edward Riggs
