= William Cairnes =

Irish politician and merchant

William Cairnes (c.1669 – August 1707) was an Irish politician and merchant.

He was the second son of John Cairnes and his wife Jane Miller, daughter of James Miller. His brothers were Alexander Cairnes and Henry Cairnes. In 1703, Cairnes was elected as member of parliament for Newtown Limavady and Belfast, representing the latter constituency in the Irish House of Commons until his death in 1707.

Cairnes died without children and was buried at St Michan's Church in Dublin on 9 August 1707.

Parliament of Ireland
Preceded by Charles Chichester; James Macartney	Member of Parliament for Belfast; 1703–1707; With: William Crafford	Succeeded by William Crafford; Samuel Ogle
Preceded by William Porter; Richard Stone	Member of Parliament for Newtown Limavady; 1703; With: William Conolly	Succeeded by George Macartney; Thomas Carr
