= The Wonderful Barn =

Building in Celbridge, Ireland

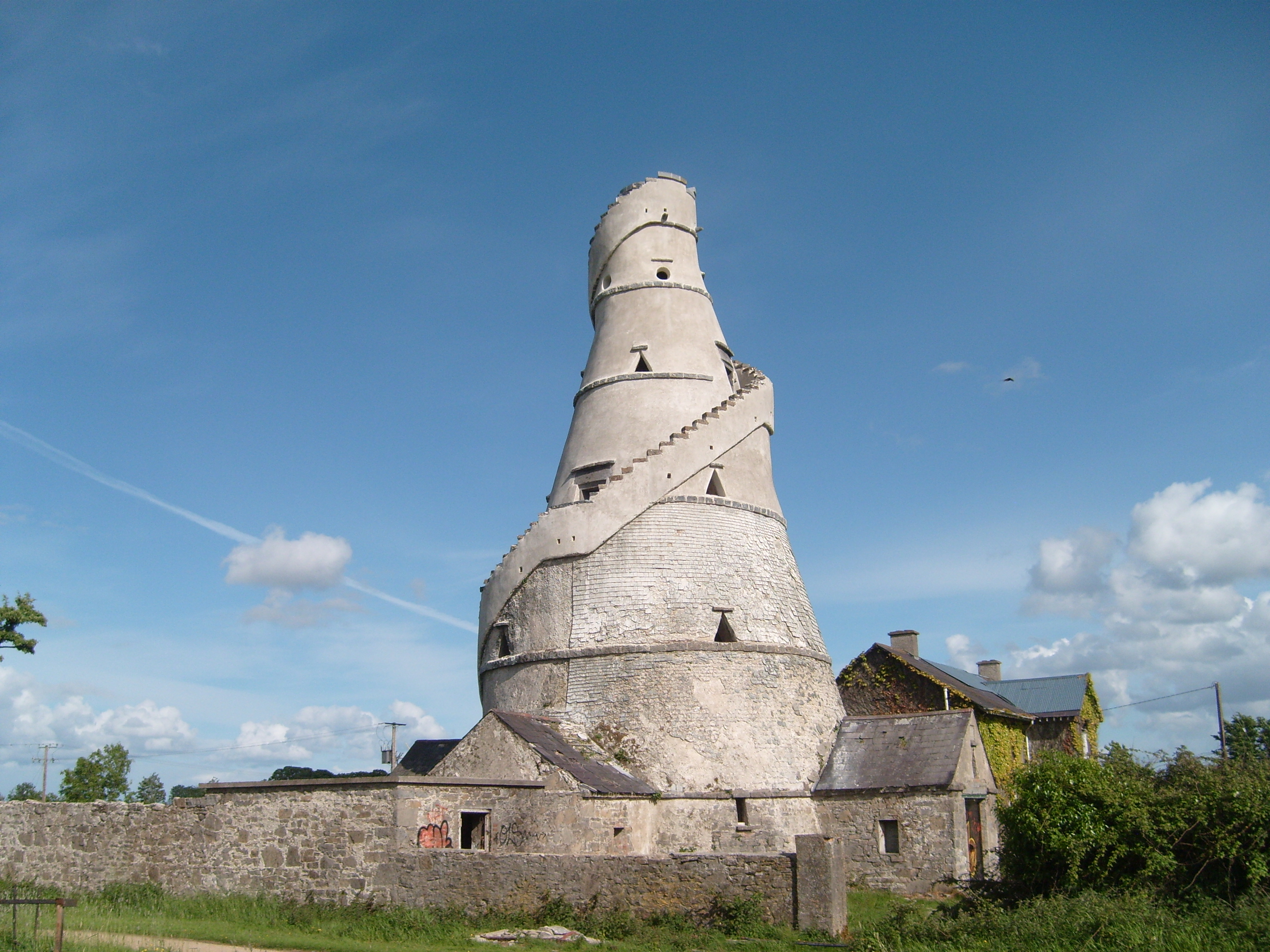

- Location within Dublin

General information
- Status: Inactive, heritage building
- Architectural style: Georgian
- Location: Barnhall, Leixlip, Ireland
- Coordinates: 53.359757°N 6.510011°W
- Elevation: 60 m (200 ft)
- Completed: 1743
- Landlord: John Glin

Height
- Height: 22 m (72 ft)

Dimensions
- Diameter: 11 m (36 ft) at base
- Circumference: 35 m (115 ft) at base

Technical details
- Material: red brick overlain with rubble stone
- Floor count: 7

Design and construction
- Known for: unusual shape

The Wonderful Barn is a corkscrew-shaped building on the edge of Castletown House Estate, formerly of the Conolly family, in Celbridge, County Kildare, Ireland. The barn itself is formally in neighbouring Leixlip.

== Structure ==
Flanked by two smaller dovecote towers, the barn was built with the stairs ascending around the exterior of the building.

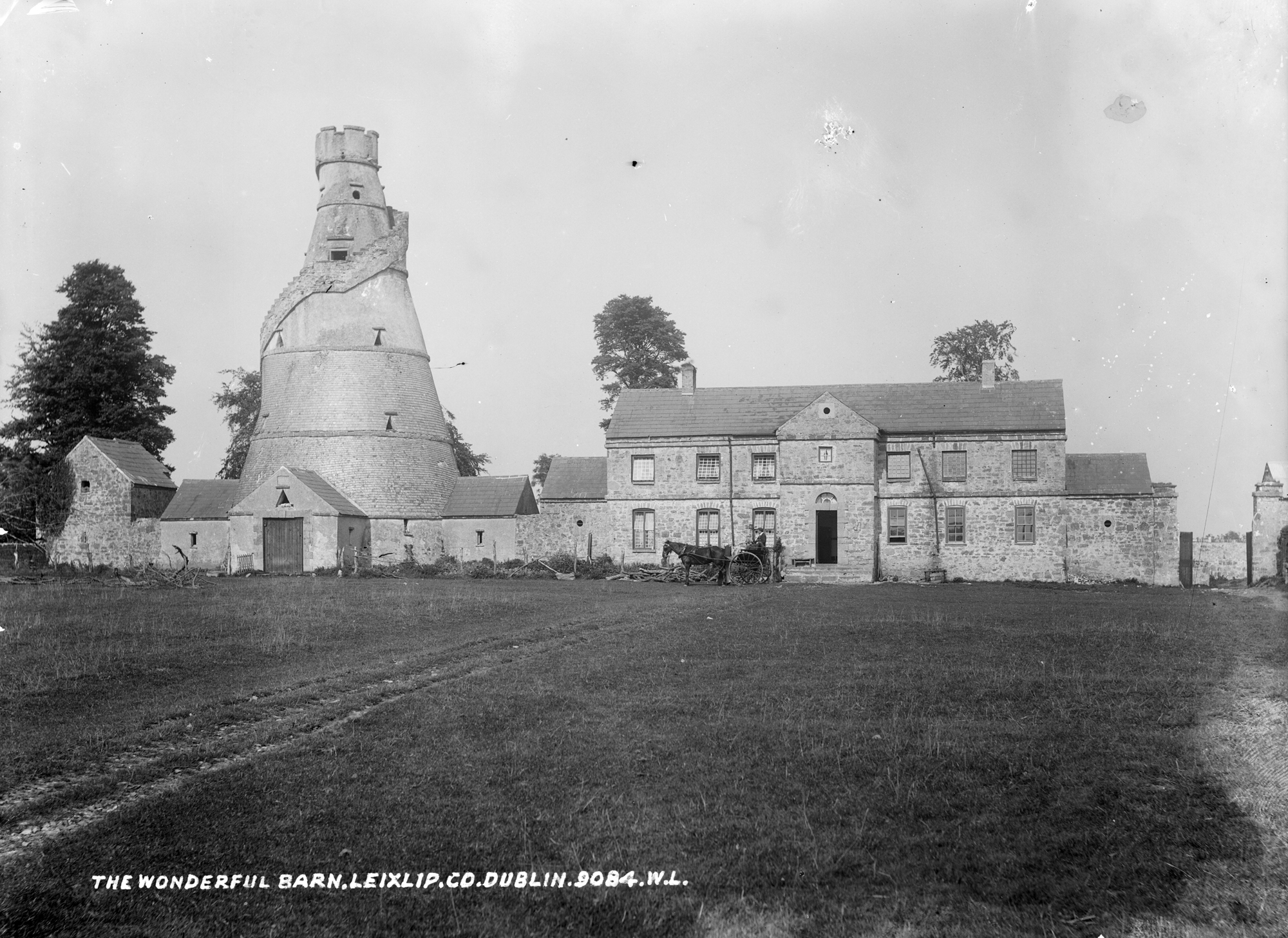
View of the Barn and the adjoining house, circa 1900

== History ==
The barn was built in 1743 on the Leixlip side of the Castletown Estate.

Several purposes are suggested for the unique structure:

- One theory is based on the custom in Georgian times of using doves as a delicacy when other game or animals were not in season, and suggest its use as a dovecote.
- The height of the structure would also lend itself to sport shooting, supporting another theory of its use as a shooting or gamekeepers tower.
- The tower is seen from the east windows of Castletown House, so it filled that vista, possibly as a folly.
- However, a central hole through each of the floors supports the generally accepted theory of its use as a granary. The barn was built in the years immediately following the famine of 1740–41, as there was a need for new grain stores in case of another famine. The Conollys owned Kilmacredock and rented it out, so the barn was also useful for their tenants.

The construction project also likely served as a way to keep the local poor employed. In this, it is not unlike the Conolly Folly (an Obelisk), which was built on the estate in 1740-41.

A similar structure known as the Bottle Tower, built in imitation of the Wonderful Barn, is located in Churchtown, close to Rathfarnham.

== See also ==
- The Minaret of Samarra
