= Michael Beecher (politician) =

Irish politician (1674–1726)

Michael Beecher (8 April 1674 – 1726) was an Irish politician.

Born at Aughadown in County Cork, he was the son of Colonel Thomas Beecher and his wife Elizabeth Turner, daughter of Henry Turner. Beecher was educated at the Trinity College, Dublin and graduated with a Bachelor of Arts in 1695. Between 1713 and 1727, he sat in the Irish House of Commons for Baltimore, the same constituency his father had represented before. Beecher was married to Peniel Gates. in 1698. His will was proved 8 September 1726.

Although the surname was spelt Becher by the family, the version today used is Beecher.

Parliament of Ireland
Preceded by Francis Langston; Edward Riggs	Member of Parliament for Baltimore; 1713–1726; With: Richard Barry 1713–1715; William Southwell 1715–1721; Sir Percy Freke, 2nd Bt 1721–1726	Succeeded by Sir Percy Freke, 2nd Bt; Richard Tonson
