= Alexander Cairnes =

Sir Alexander Cairnes, 1st Baronet (1665 – 30 October 1732) was an Irish politician and banker.

== Background ==
He was the oldest son of John Cairnes of Donoghmore, co. Donegal, and his wife Jane Miller, daughter of James Miller, MD. His younger brother was William Cairnes. During his military service, he became friend with John Churchill, 1st Duke of Marlborough.

== Career ==
Cairnes served in the British Army and took part in the Battle of Blenheim. For this, he was created a baronet, of Monaghan, in Ireland by Queen Anne of Great Britain on 6 May 1708, with a special remainder to his youngest brother Henry. In 1710, Cairnes entered the Irish House of Commons for Monaghan Borough, representing it until 1713. Subsequently, he was returned for County Monaghan until 1727, when he stood also for Monaghan Borough. He was elected for both constituencies, however, chose the latter and sat for it as Member of Parliament until his death in 1733. Cairnes was appointed Keeper of Phoenix Park in 1712.

Thomas Sheridan thought him "an eminent Banker", but Jonathan Swift dismissed him as "a scrupulous puppy" and "a shuffling scoundrel".

== Family ==
On 17 February 1697/98, he married Elizabeth Gould, daughter of John Gould and sister of Sir Nathaniel Gould, at St Peter le Poer in London, and had by her a daughter and a son, Mary and William Henry.

Elizabeth died at Monaghan before 4 June 1731, when the administration of her estate was granted to her husband. Cairnes died at Dublin on 30 October 1732 and his son having predeceased him, was succeeded in the baronetcy according to the special remainder by his brother. His daughter was fostered and educated by Sarah Churchill, Duchess of Marlborough.

Mary Cairnes (died 28 August 1790) married Baron Blayney, and at the time of Cairnes's death, she was a childless widow. She subsequently remarried, in 1734, to Col. John Murray, who was Member of Parliament for County Monaghan in the early 1740s. Murray died on 29 June 1743 leaving his wife with several daughters. One of the daughters, Elizabeth, married Robert Cuninghame, 1st Baron Rossmore, and another, Harriet, was the mother of Warner Westenra, 2nd Baron Rossmore, who succeeded to his maternal aunt's husband's barony by special remainder.

Parliament of Ireland
Preceded by Sir Thomas Prendergast, 1st Bt; Sir Richard Vernon, 3rd Bt	Member of Parliament for Monaghan Borough; 1710–1713; With: Sir Richard Vernon, 3rd Bt	Succeeded by Francis Lucas; Richard Pockrich
Preceded by Robert Echlin; William Barton	Member of Parliament for County Monaghan; 1713–1728; With: Alexander Montgomery 1713–1723; Thomas Coote 1723–1727; John Montgomery 1727–1728	Succeeded by Hugh Willoughby; John Montgomery
Preceded by Francis Lucas; Hugh Willoughby	Member of Parliament for Monaghan Borough; 1727–1732; With: Francis Lucas	Succeeded by Francis Lucas; Sir Henry Cairnes, 2nd Bt
Baronetage of Great Britain
New creation	Baronet (of Monaghan); 1708–1732	Succeeded by Henry Cairnes
