= Thomas Knox (died 1728) =

Irish politician

Thomas Knox (circa 1640 – 11 May 1728) was an Irish politician.

He sat in the Irish House of Commons for Newtownards from 1692 to 1693 and then for Dungannon from 1695 to 1727. On 18 November 1715 he was appointed to the Irish Privy Council.

His daughter Mary married Oliver St George in 1701.
