= William Conolly =

Irish politician

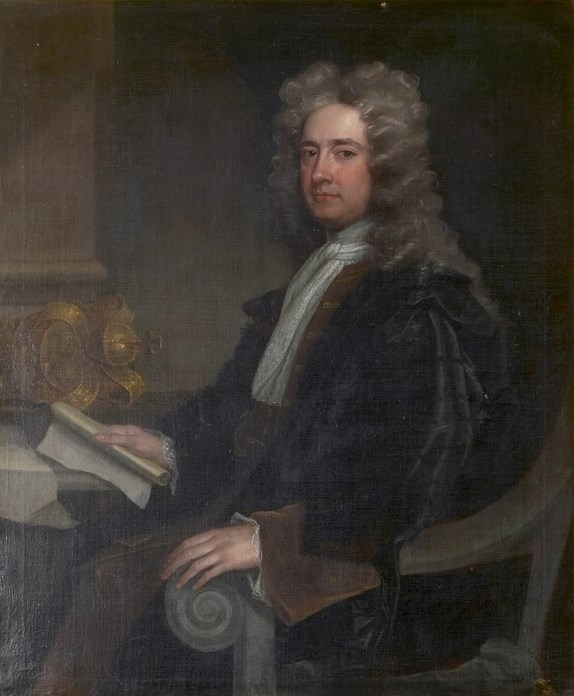
- Portrait by Charles Jervas

Personal details
- Born: 9 April 1662 Ballyshannon, County Donegal, Ireland
- Died: 30 October 1729 (aged 67) Castletown House, Celbridge, County Kildare, Ireland
- Spouse: Katherine Conyngham
- Relations: William James Conolly (nephew), Thomas Conolly (great nephew)

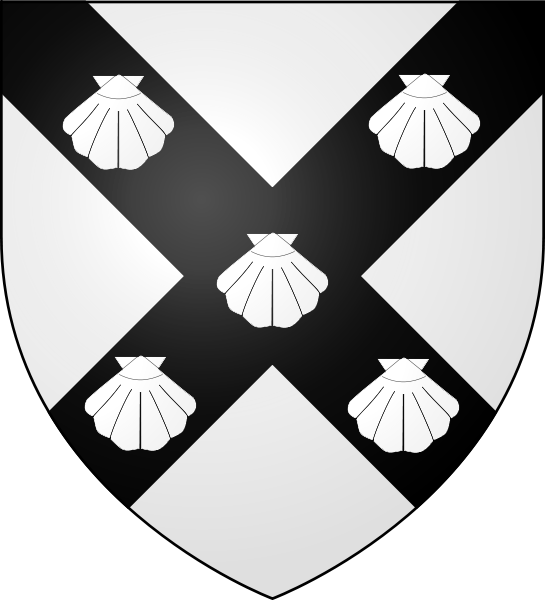
Arms of Conolly: Argent, on a saltire sable five escallops of the field

William Conolly (9 April 1662 – 30 October 1729), also known as Speaker Conolly, was an Irish Whig politician, Commissioner of Revenue, lawyer and landowner. He was an influential figure in Irish politics, serving as Speaker of the Irish House of Commons between 1715 and his death.

== Career ==
William Conolly was born the son of an inn-keeper, Patrick Conolly, in Ballyshannon, County Donegal. Patrick Conolly was a native of County Monaghan, and a descendant of the Ó Conghalaigh clan of Airgíalla. Patrick settled in County Donegal, embraced the Anglican Church, and had children William, Patrick, Hugh, Phelim and Thady. He set aside enough money that he was able to send William to Dublin to study law. William Conolly qualified as an attorney in 1685, aged twenty-three.

He practised as a lawyer in Dublin and in 1694 he married Katherine Conyngham, daughter of General Sir Albert Conyngham. The Conynghams were an Ulster Scots family who were originally from Mountcharles (pronounced 'Mount-char-liss') in County Donegal. The family later settled at Slane Castle in County Meath in the 1780s, where the Conynghams still reside. They had no children, and on Katherine's death in 1752 the estates were inherited by William James Conolly, his nephew by his brother Patrick.

He made his fortune from land transfers, following the confiscations by the Crown of lands belonging to supporters of King James II, in the wake of the Glorious Revolution and the accession of William III and Mary II in 1688–91, known as the "Williamite War in Ireland". About 600,000 Irish acres were confiscated to be sold to pay for the costs of the war, (equivalent to 972,000 statute acres), nearly 5% of the land area of Ireland. Conolly was the largest individual buyer, in particular buying 3,300 acres in County Meath that had been assigned to the Earl of Albemarle.

He built the first winged Palladian house in Ireland, Castletown House in Celbridge, County Kildare, starting in 1722, and specified that every part of it had to be made from Irish materials. His Dublin town house was on Capel Street, then the most fashionable part of the city. He also commissioned the Old Custom House and the Irish Houses of Parliament, the world's first building specifically designed as a bicameral parliament.

Conolly was the most important of the "Undertakers", the managers of Government business in the Irish House of Commons, in the early 18th century. He was associated with the moderate faction of Whigs and was opposed by the Brodrick faction from Cork. He was a Member of Parliament for Donegal Borough from 1692 to 1703 and subsequently for County Londonderry until his death in 1729. In 1703 and 1713, he was also elected for Newtown Limavady and in 1727 for Ballyshannon, but chose each time not to sit.

He was Speaker of the Irish House of Commons and a Commissioner of the Revenue from 1715 to his death in 1729. His name was spelt "Conolly", rather than the more familiar Connolly, deriving ultimately from the Gaelic surname "O Conghaile".

On his death, Archbishop Boulter estimated Conolly's income in 1729 at £17,000 p.a. His widow Katherine continued to live in style at Castletown until her death in 1752. She built the Wonderful Barn and the Conolly Folly in the 1740s. Then their estates passed briefly to William's nephew William junior, and then on to his great-nephew Tom Conolly M.P., known as "Squire Tom", who was married to Lady Louisa Conolly.

A pub in Celbridge, "The Speaker's Bar", was named in his memory. There is also a pub in Firhouse, Dublin, called "The Speaker Conolly" named after him.

== Wealth ==
Conolly was reputed to be the wealthiest man in Ireland at the date of his death. He paid £32,000 and an annuity of £500 p.a., for his 30,586-acre estate at his birthplace in Ballyshannon, County Donegal, in 1718; £62,000 for his 10,360-acre estate in Rathfarnham, County Dublin, in 1723; and £12,000 for 809 acres including Leixlip, County Kildare, in 1728, together with other properties in Dublin. His 2,300-acre property at Celbridge was bought in 1709 from Thomas Dongan, 2nd Earl of Limerick.

By his death he owned 148,487 acres that yielded a gross income of £14,926 p.a.

The Conolly residence "Cliff House", on the banks of the River Erne between Belleek, County Fermanagh and Ballyshannon, was demolished as part of the Erne Hydroelectric scheme, which constructed the Cliff and Cathleen's Fall hydroelectric power stations. Cliff hydroelectric power station was constructed on the site of "Cliff House" and was commissioned in 1950.

Parliament of Ireland
Unknown	Member of Parliament for Donegal Borough; 1692–1703; With: John Hamilton 1692–1695; William Gore 1695–1703	Succeeded by Sir Ralph Gore, 4th Bt; Richard Jones
Preceded by William Porter; Richard Stone	Member of Parliament for Newtown Limavady; 1703; With: William Cairnes	Succeeded by George Macartney; Thomas Carr
Preceded by Sir Tristram Beresford, 3rd Bt; William Jackson	Member of Parliament for County Londonderry; 1703–1729; With: Hercules Rowley	Succeeded by Arthur Dawson; Hercules Rowley
Preceded by George Macartney; Thomas Carr	Member of Parliament for Newtown Limavady; 1713–1714; With: Hugh Henry	Succeeded by Benjamin Parry; William Ussher
Preceded by Owen Wynne; John Rochfort	Member of Parliament for Ballyshannon; 1727; With: Thomas Pearson	Succeeded by William James Conolly; Thomas Pearson
Political offices
Preceded by Alan Brodrick	Speaker of the Irish House of Commons; 1715–1729	Succeeded by Ralph Gore
