= List of Irish MPs 1727–1760 =

This is a list of members of the Irish House of Commons between 1727 and 1760. There were 300 MPs at a time in this period.

| Name | Constituency | Notes |
|---|---|---|
| Archibald Acheson | Dublin University (1741-1761) | |
| Sir Arthur Acheson | Mullingar (1727-1748) | |
| James Agar | Gowran (1753-1761) | |
| Edward Stratford | Baltinglass (1759-1768) | |
| John Stratford | Baltinglass (1717-1763) | |
| John Allen | Carysfort (1733-1742) | |
| John Allen | County Wicklow (1742-1745) | |
| Francis Andrews | Midleton (1759-1761) | |
| John Gore | Jamestown (1747-1760) | |
| Arthur Gore | Donegal Borough (1727-1758) | |
| Arthur Gore | Donegal Borough (1759-1761) | |
| Tichborne Aston | Ardee (1741-1748) | |
| Bernard Ward | County Down (1745-1770) | |
| James Barry | Rathcormack (1727-1743) | |
| Redmond Barry | Tallow and Rathcormack (1717-1750) | |
| Sir Edward Barry | Charleville (1744-1760) | |
| Thomas Taylour | Kells (1747-1760) | |
| Sir John Bingham | County Mayo (1727-1749) | |
| Sir John Bingham | County Mayo (1749-1750) | |
| John Blakeney | Athenry (1727-1747) | |
| Robert Blakeney | Athenry (1721-1733) | |
| Robert Blakeney | Athenry (1747-1762) | |
| William Blakeney | Kilmallock (1725-1757) | |
| Arthur Blennerhassett | Tralee (1727 to 1743) | |
| John Blunden | Kilkenny City (1727-1752) | |
| Sir Kildare Borrowes | County Kildare (1745-1776) | |
| Walter Borrowes | Athy (1727-1741) | |
| John Bowes | Taghmon (1731-1742) | |
| Henry Boyle | Tallow (1751-1756) | |
| Robert Boyle | Dungarvan (1758-1768) | |
| Richard Hamilton | Navan (1755-1761) | |
| Philip Bragg | Armagh () | |
| St John Brodrick | County of Cork (1715-1728) | |
| Henry Brooke | County Fermanagh (1727-1761) | |
| Thomas Burgh | Naas (1713-1730) | |
| Dominick Burke | Galway (1735-1747) | |
| Francis Burton | County Clare (1727-1744) | |
| Samuel Burton | Dublin City (1727-) | |
| Sir Richard Butler | County Carlow (1730-1761) | |
| Alexander Cairnes | Monaghan (1727-1732) | |
| Henry Cairnes | Monaghan (1732-1743) | |
| Walter Carey | Clogher | Chief Secretary for Ireland, 1730–37 |
| William Flower | | |
| St George Caulfeild | | |
| Nathaniel Clements | | |
| William Fortescue | | |
| Thomas Clutterbuck | Lisburn | Chief Secretary for Ireland, 1724–30 |
| Marmaduke Coghill | | |
| John Cole | | |
| William Conolly | | |
| Henry Seymour Conway | | Chief Secretary for Ireland, 1755–57 |
| Francis Conyngham | | |
| Henry Conyngham | | |
| Hamilton Boyle | | |
| Leslie Corry | | |
| James Stopford | | |
| Maurice Crosbie | | |
| William Crosbie | | |
| William Francis Crosbie | | |
| James Cuffe | | |
| James Daly | | |
| John Bligh | | |
| Sir Matthew Deane | | |
| Sir Matthew Deane | | |
| Sir Robert Deane | | |
| Richard Nugent | | |
| Michael O'Brien | | |
| Arthur Dobbs | Carrickfergus (1727-1760) | Surveyor General of Ireland, 1733–44 |
| William Ponsonby | | Chief Secretary for Ireland, 1741–45 |
| John Perceval | | |
| Abraham Creighton | | |
| Daniel Falkiner | | |
| Barry Maxwell | | |
| John Maxwell | | |
| Robert Maxwell | | |
| John FitzGerald | | |
| Robert FitzGerald | | |
| John Petty | | |
| Richard FitzPatrick | | |
| Henry Flood | | |
| Warden Flood | | |
| John Folliot | | |
| John Folliott | | |
| John Forbes | | |
| Chichester Fortescue | | |
| James Fortescue | | |
| Thomas Fortescue | | |
| Anthony Foster | | |
| John Redmond Freke | | |
| Percy Freke | | |
| Robert French | | |
| Charles Gardiner | | |
| Luke Gardiner | | |
| William Annesley | | |
| Sir Arthur Gore | | |
| Sir Ralph Gore | | |
| St George Gore | | |
| George Forbes | | |
| Charles Hamilton | | |
| George Hamilton | | |
| Gustavus Hamilton | | |
| Henry Hamilton | | |
| Gustavus Handcock | | |
| Robert Handcock | | |
| William Handcock | | |
| William Handcock | | |
| Price Hartstonge | | |
| John Hely | | |
| Francis Ingram | | |
| Peter Holmes | | |
| Nicholas Hume | | |
| Robert Jocelyn | | |
| Arthur Jones | | |
| Robert King | | |
| Sir Edward Knatchbull | | |
| George Beresford | | |
| Humphrey Butler | | |
| Joseph Leeson | | |
| Joseph Leeson | | |
| Richard Liddell | Jamestown | Chief Secretary for Ireland, 1745–46 |
| James FitzGerald | | |
| James Hamilton | | |
| John Lysaght | | |
| Henry Loftus | | |
| Thomas Pakenham | | |
| Gorges Lowther | | |
| Hugh Massy | | |
| Samuel Molyneux | | |
| Alexander Montgomery | | |
| Alexander Montgomery | | |
| John Montgomery | | |
| John Montgomery | | |
| Thomas Montgomery | | |
| Stephen Moore | | |
| Charles Moore | | |
| Brinsley Butler | | |
| Thomas Knox | | |
| Sir Edward O'Brien | | |
| Murrough O'Brien | | |
| Sir John Osborne | | |
| Robert Parkinson | | |
| Sir William Parsons | | |
| Marcus Paterson | | |
| Edward Lovett Pearce | | |
| Edmund Pery | | |
| Ambrose Philips | | |
| John Pomeroy | | |
| John Ponsonby | | |
| Sir Thomas Prendergast | | |
| William Richardson | | |
| Richard Rigby | | Chief Secretary for Ireland, 1757–61 |
| Ralph Gore | | |
| Robert Cuninghame | | |
| Francis Russell | | |
| John Ruxton | | |
| William Ruxton | | |
| Lord George Sackville | | Chief Secretary for Ireland, 1750–55 |
| Oliver St George | | |
| William Scott | | |
| Henry Boyle | | |
| Richard Boyle | | |
| George Smyth | | |
| Sir James Somerville | | |
| Bowen Southwell | | |
| Henry Southwell | | |
| Richard Southwell | | |
| Thomas Southwell | | |
| St George St George | | |
| Philip Tisdall | | |
| Charles Tottenham | | |
| Richard Townsend | | |
| Frederick Trench | | |
| Richard Trench | | |
| John Ussher | | |
| John Ussher | | |
| Edward Walpole | | Chief Secretary for Ireland, 1737–39 |
| Garret Wesley | | |
| Richard Wesley | | |
| Edward Weston | | Chief Secretary for Ireland, 1746–50 |
| Owen Wynne | | |
