= Ruxton =

Ruxton may refer to:

== Places ==
- Ruxton, a place in Herefordshire, England
- Ruxton-Riderwood, Maryland, United States
- Ruxton Creek, Manitou Springs, Colorado, United States
- Ruxton Island, near Vancouver, Canada
- Ruxton Park, Manitou Springs, Colorado, United States

== People ==
=== Surname ===
- Bruce Ruxton (1926–2011), Australian veteran
- Buck Ruxton (1899–1936), physician and convicted murderer
- Charles Ruxton (1726–1806), Irish landowner and Member of Parliament
- George Ruxton (1821–1848), British explorer and travel writer
- Graeme Ruxton, ecologist
- John Ruxton (1721–1785), Irish landowner and Member of Parliament
- William Parkinson Ruxton (1766–1847), Irish Member of Parliament
- William Ruxton (1697–1751), Irish landowner and Member of Parliament

=== Given name ===
- Nicholas Ruxton Moore (1756–1816), United States Representative from Maryland
- Ruxton Hayward (1930–2011), British eccentric said to have inspired the character Bluebottle in The Goon Show
- William Ruxton Davison (died 1893), British ornithologist and collector

== Other ==
- Ruxton (automobile), produced 1929–1931 in the United States
