= William Aston (disambiguation) =

William Aston (1916–1997) was an Australian politician.

William Aston may also refer to:

- William Aston (Jesuit) (1735–1800), English Jesuit
- Bill Aston (1900–1974), British racing driver
- William George Aston (1841–1911), British scholar of Japan
- William Aston (Irish judge) (1613–1671), English-born barrister, politician and soldier
- William Aston (MP) (fl. 1407), English politician, MP for Liskeard

== See also ==
- Francis William Aston (1877–1945), British chemist and physicist
