= Tichborne (disambiguation) =

Tichborne is a village in Hampshire, England. The term may also refer to:

== People ==
- Chidiock Tichborne (1558–1586), English conspirator and poet
- Nancy Tichborne (born 1942), New Zealand watercolour artist
- Nicholas Tichborne (16th century – 1601), English activist
- Thomas Tichborne (1567–1602), English religious leader
- Tichborne Aston (1723–1748), Irish politician

== Other uses ==
- Tichborne, Ontario, village in Central Frontenac Township, in Canada
- Tichborne baronets, two baronetcies in the Baronetage of England
- Tichborne case, 19th century fraud prosecution of someone claiming to be Sir Roger Tichborne
- Tichborne Dole, English charity festival held in Tichborne
