= William Ruxton =

William Ruxton may refer to:

- William Ruxton (1697–1751), Irish landowner and Member of Parliament
- William Parkinson Ruxton (1766–1847), Irish Member of Parliament
