= Sir Henry Tichborne =

17th-century English soldier and politician

Sir Henry Tichborne PC (Ire) (1581–1667) was an English soldier and politician. He excelled at the Siege of Drogheda during the Irish Rebellion of 1641. He governed Ireland as one of the two Lord Justices from 1642 to 1644. In 1647, he fought under Michael Jones against the Irish Catholic Confederates in the Battle of Dungan's Hill. He was given the Beaulieu Manor by Cromwell and its possession was confirmed to him at the Restoration.

== Birth and origins ==
Henry was born in 1581 in England, the fourth son of Benjamin Tichborne and his second wife, Amphilis Weston. His father would be created the 1st Baronet of Tichborne, Hampshire, in 1621. His mother was a daughter of Richard Weston of Skrynes in Roxwell, Essex, and Wilburga Catesby. His branch of the family was Anglican, and he was only remotely related to the Catholic martyrs Nicholas Tichborne (died 1601) and Thomas Tichborne (died 1602).

== Early life ==
Like many younger sons of English landowning families, Henry chose a military career. He served as a soldier in the north of Ireland, where the Plantation of Ulster was in progress. He became governor of Lifford, County Donegal, about 1620. He was knighted on 24 August 1623 at Tichborne in England by King James I.

In December 1623, Tichbourne was appointed a Commissioner for the Plantation of County Londonderry. He received large grants of land in County Leitrim and County Donegal that had been confiscated from Irish landowners.

He was elected MP for Tyrone County in the Parliament of 1634–1635, the first of Charles I.

== Irish wars ==
Ireland suffered 11 years of war from 1641 to 1652, which are usually divided into the Rebellion of 1641, the Confederate Wars, and the Cromwellian Conquest. This eleven years' war in turn forms part of the Wars of the Three Kingdoms, also known as the British Civil Wars.

=== Siege of Drogheda ===
When the Irish Rebellion of 1641 broke out Tichborne was living at Finglas near Dublin. He brought his family to Dublin for safety, and the Crown quickly enlisted his services for the defence of Drogheda. He held the town in Royalist hands despite the hostility of most of the inhabitants who favoured the insurgents. He showed great courage and determination and refused to contemplate surrender even when the situation was desperate. When the garrison were reduced to eating their own horses, he said that "he would stay till the last bit of horseflesh was eaten, then fight his way out". Despite repeated onslaughts from the rebels, and some suspicion of treachery on his own side, he managed to hold out from November 1641 until 5 March 1642 when the rebels raised the siege. This was "for the English, the first good news out of Ireland in five appalling months". He then received reinforcements from James Butler, 12th Earl of Ormond and joined forces with Charles Moore, 2nd Viscount Moore of Drogheda to prevent the rebels from regaining control of the Pale. Tichbourne and Moore marched on Dundalk, which they took on 26 March: Tichborne became governor of the town.

=== After Drogheda ===
His defence of Drogheda greatly enhanced his political standing. On 11 May 1642 he was sworn of the privy council and in March 1643 King Charles I appointed him Lord Justice of Ireland jointly with Sir John Borlase, instead of Sir William Parsons, 1st Baronet of Bellamont. He held office until 21 January 1644 when Ormond was appointed Lord Lieutenant of Ireland.

Clarendon said that he was by then a man of "so excellent a fame" that even the King's bitterest enemies in Parliament had nothing to say against the appointment. He opposed the cease-fire with the Confederates that was negotiated by Ormond and signed on 15 September 1643. In 1644 he went to England with the aim of advising the King in his negotiations with the Irish Confederacy, but was captured by Parliamentary forces on his way back and spent several months in the Tower of London, until Parliament consented to his exchange.

=== Siding with the English Parliament ===
Back in Ireland in the autumn of 1645, he resumed his office as Governor of Drogheda. He soon concluded, as did many others, that the Royalists could not retain control of Ireland: the real struggle was between the Irish Confederacy and Parliament, and Tichborne, having already fought against the Confederates, decided to throw in his lot with Parliament. Though he was initially regarded with some suspicion by his new masters, he relieved their doubts about his loyalty by fighting with distinction at the Battle of Dungan's Hill in April 1647 where Michael Jones crushed the Confederate army of Leinster; and he was highly rewarded as a result. At the same time he acquired a reputation for ruthlessness towards his Irish opponents which was notable even by the standards of the time: "killing many hundreds with his own hands". In 1650 he had a personal interview with Oliver Cromwell who assured him of his goodwill, and promised him the estate of Beaulieu, forfeited by the attainder of Christopher Plunket, 2nd Earl of Fingall The estate was promised to him in 1654, but Louth and Meath had been set apart for the adventurers and he could not get it. He was eventually given equivalent lands in Wicklow in 1656. (which he eventually obtained possession of, with some difficulty). His famous letter to his wife, written in 1651, is a valuable first-hand description of the Siege of Drogheda and of his later military exploits. It has been suggested that it was intended for more widespread circulation, with a view to obtaining further reward for his services.

== Restoration ==
From 1650 on he lived in retirement until the Restoration of Charles II, when his submission to Parliament was not held against him (such conduct having been common enough among both English and Irish royalists). Sir Henry was made marshal of the army of Ireland for life in July 1660. He was elected to the Irish House of Commons as member for Sligo in 1661. In 1666 he was finally confirmed by the Court of Claims as owner of the confiscated estate of Christopher Plunket, 2nd Earl of Fingall in County Louth, originally promised to him by Cromwell, where he began the building of a mansion, Beaulieu House, which still exists, although it was substantially rebuilt by his grandson, Lord Ferrard. He was clearly a very rich man: as late as 1717 his great-granddaughter Judith brought a fortune to her husband Charles Spencer, 3rd Earl of Sunderland. He fell ill towards the end of the year and planned to travel to Spa for his health but was too weak to leave home (he was now about eighty-five, a great age for the time). He died at Beaulieu early in 1667 and was buried in St Mary's Church, Drogheda.

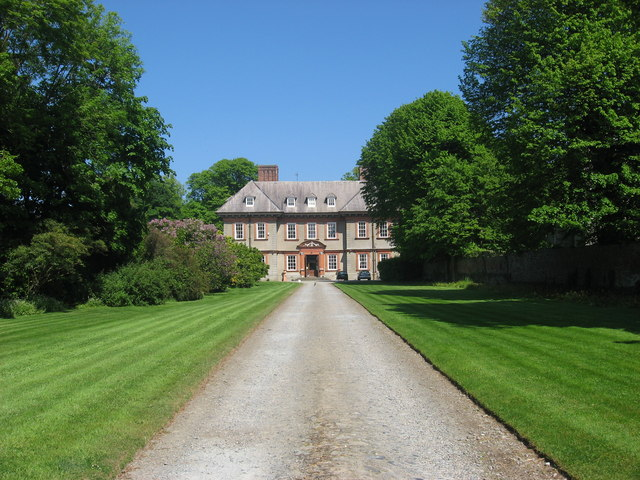
Beaulieu House

== Marriage and children ==
He married Jane, daughter of Sir Robert Newcomen of Keenagh, County Longford, first of the Newcomen baronets, and his first wife Katherine Molyneux, daughter of Sir Thomas Molyneux, Chancellor of the Exchequer of Ireland, and his wife Catherine Stabeort of Bruges. They are said to have quarrelled over his desertion of the Royalist cause, and for a time she left him and went to live on the Isle of Man (although it is possible that this was for her own safety). They seem to have become reconciled in their later years, (she was of course the recipient of his famous letter of 1651), since they are buried together at Beaulieu. Jane died in 1664.

Henry and Jane had eight children, five sons:

1. Benjamin, killed at Belruddery during the Irish Confederate war, aged 21
2. William (died 1693), married Judith Bysse, daughter of John Bysse, Chief Baron of the Irish Exchequer, and widow of Robert Molesworth, by whom he was the father of Henry, first and last Baron Ferrard
3. Richard, major of the Horse Guards in Ireland, died unmarried
4. Henry, died unmarried
5. Samuel, died young

—and three daughters:

1. Dorcas, married William Toxteth, Esquire, of Drogheda, a native of Lancashire
2. Amphilis, married Richard Broughton, a younger brother of Sir Edward Broughton; in 1674, at the time of her marriage, she was painted by the noted pastellist Edmund Ashfield.
3. Elizabeth, married Roger West of The Rock, County Wicklow and Ballydugan, County Down, who was High Sheriff of Down in 1657.

== Character ==
Tichborne was praised in his own time by the Confederate Ireland leader Richard Bellings as a man who was "trusty to the King, valiant and moderate", but the accuracy of this verdict has since been questioned. His willingness to come to an accommodation with Cromwell, and to be enriched by him, casts doubt on how "trusty" he was to either the King or his subsequent masters. His courage and military skill are not in dispute, but these qualities are overshadowed by his ruthlessness, even by the standards of the time, towards the Irish. He was described by a contemporary, the regicide John Moore, later Governor of Dublin, as "so great an enemy to the rebels in Ireland, killing many hundreds of them at his own hand or standing by to watch them executed". Tichborne himself admitted that he was a man who "showed little mercy". A modern view is that he was valued in his own time for his military skills, but not for his political judgment or humane qualities.

== Sources ==
- Armstrong, R. M. (2004). "Tichborne, Sir Henry (1581?–1667)". In Matthew, Colin; Harrison, Brian (eds.). Oxford Dictionary of National Biography. Vol. 54. New York: Oxford University Press. pp. 754–756. ISBN 0-19-861404-7.
- Burke, Bernard (1866). A Genealogical History of the Dormant, Abeyant, Forfeited and Extinct Peerages of the British Empire (New ed.). London: Harrison. OCLC 11501348.
- Burton, Edwin (1913). "Tichborne, Ven. Nicholas". In Herbermann, Charles George (ed.). Catholic Encyclopedia. Vol. 14. New York: The Encyclopedia Press. p. 721. OCLC 1157968788.
- Clavin, Terry. "Tichbourne, Henry". Dictionary of Irish Biography. – Online edition
- Cokayne, George Edward (1900). Complete Baronetage, 1611 to 1800. Vol. 1 (1st ed.). Exeter: William Pollard & Co. OCLC 866278985. – 1611 to 1625
- Dunlop, Robert (1898). "Tichborne, Sir Henry (1581 ?–1667)". In Lee, Sidney (ed.). Dictionary of National Biography. Vol. 56. London: Smith, Elder, & Co. pp. 375–377. OCLC 8544105.
- Gilbert, John Thomas, ed. (1882). History of the Irish Confederation and the War in Ireland 1641–1643. Historic literature of Ireland. Vol. 1 (limited to two hundred copies ed.). Dublin: Printed for the editor by M. H. Gill & Son. OCLC 220683699. – History based on Richard Bellings memoirs
- House of Commons (1878). Return. Members of Parliament – Part II. Parliaments of Great Britain, 1705–1796. Parliaments of the United Kingdom, 1801–1874. Parliaments and Conventions of the Estates of Scotland, 1357–1707. Parliaments of Ireland, 1599–1800. London: His/Her Majesty's Stationery Office. OCLC 13112546.
- Mahaffy, Robert Pentland, ed. (1903). Calendar of the State Papers Relating to Ireland Preserved in the Public Record Office. 1647–1660. London: His/Her Majesty's Stationery Office.
- Mahaffy, Robert Pentland, ed. (1905). Calendar of the State Papers Relating to Ireland. Preserved in the Public Record Office. 1660–1662. London: His/Her Majesty's Stationery Office.
- Morrill, John, ed. (1991). The Impact of the English Civil War. London: Collins & Brown. ISBN 1-85585-042-7.
- Pocock, John Greville Agard (1996). "The Atlantic Archipelago and the War of the Three Kingdoms". In Bradshaw, Brendan; Morrill, John (eds.). The British Problem c. 1534–1707: State Formation in the Atlantic Archipelago. London: MacMillan Education. pp. 172–191. doi:10.1007/978-1-349-24731-8_7. ISBN 978-0-333-59246-5.
- Temple, John (1751). The Irish Rebellion: Or, an History of the Beginnings, and First Progress of the General Rebellion Raised within the Kingdom of Ireland, in the Year 1641. London: E. Golding. OCLC 35303794.
- Wainewright, John B. (1913). "Tichborne, Ven. Nicholas". In Herbermann, Charles George (ed.). Catholic Encyclopedia. Vol. 14. New York: The Encyclopedia Press. p. 721. OCLC 1157968788.
- Webb, Alfred (1878). "Tichborne, Sir Henry". Compendium of Irish Biography. Dublin: M. H. Gill & Son. p. 525. OCLC 122693688.
- Wedgwood, Cicely Veronica (1978) [1st pub. 1958]. The King's War 1641–1647. London: Collins. ISBN 0-00-211404-6.
