= William Moore (Ardee MP) =

Irish politician

Hon. William Moore (c. 1685 – 1 April 1732) was an Irish politician. He sat in the Irish House of Commons from 1715 to 1727 as a Member of Parliament (MP) for the borough of Ardee in County Louth.

He was the fifth son of Henry Hamilton-Moore, 3rd Earl of Drogheda.

He married Lucy Parkinson, 1697-aft 1721 in March 1717/1718, daughter of Rev. Edward Parkinson and Mary Armstrong. They had 2 children, Henry, 1719-1794 and Mary, 1721-? Source: Brydges, Sir Egerton - Collins’s Peerage of England - AMS Press, Inc. - 9 - p. 29

Parliament of Ireland
Preceded by James Tisdall; Michael Tisdall	Member of Parliament for Ardee; 1715–1727; With: Michael Tisdall	Succeeded by Robert Parkinson; John Donnellan
