= John Wolfe, 2nd Viscount Kilwarden =

John Wolfe, 2nd Viscount Kilwarden (11 November 1769—22 May 1830) was an Irish peer.

== Biography ==
He was the son of Arthur Wolfe, 1st Viscount Kilwarden and his wife Anne Wolfe, 1st Baroness Kilwarden in her own right, daughter of William Ruxton of Ardee. At the 1790 Irish general election he was returned to the Irish House of Commons for Ardee by his cousin William Ruxton, but left Parliament at the 1797 Irish general election. He succeeded to the viscountcy when his father was killed during the Irish rebellion of 1803, but he was unmarried and his titles became extinct on his death.
