= Tallagh =

Tallagh may refer to:

- Tallaght, Dublin (obsolete spelling)
- Tallow, County Waterford (obsolete spelling)
  - Tallow (Parliament of Ireland constituency), officially Tallagh
