= Tichborne Aston =

Tichborne Aston (1 November 1716 – 4 March 1748) was an Irish politician.

He was the son of William Aston, MP for Dunleer, and his wife Hon. Salisbury Tichborne, daughter of Henry Tichborne, 1st Baron Ferrard and Arabella Cotton; The Astons, a junior branch of the family of Lord Aston of Forfar, came originally from Staffordshire. Tichborne's great-grandfather Sir William Aston, moved to `Ireland and became a prominent judge.

He was educated at Trinity College, Dublin. Aston entered the Irish House of Commons in 1741 and was Member of Parliament (MP) for Ardee until his death in 1748. He was appointed High Sheriff of Louth in 1742.

In 1746, he married Jane Rowan, daughter of William Rowan. Their only son William succeeded as Lord Aston.

Parliament of Ireland
Preceded by Robert Parkinson; John Donnellan	Member of Parliament for Ardee; 1741 – 1748; With: Robert Parkinson	Succeeded by Robert Parkinson; William Ruxton
