= High Sheriff of Louth =

The High Sheriff of Louth was the Crown's representative for County Louth, a territory known as his bailiwick. Selected from three nominated people, he held his office for the duration of a year. He had judicial, ceremonial and administrative functions and executed High Court Writs.

== History ==
The office of High Sheriff is the oldest under the British crown. It was established in Louth in 1227 and remained first in precedence in the county until the reign of Edward VII, when an Order in Council in 1908 gave the Lord-Lieutenant the prime office under the Crown as the Sovereign's personal representative. In the United Kingdom, the High Sheriff remains the Sovereign's county representative for all matters relating to the Judiciary and the maintenance of law and order. The office of High Sheriff of Louth was abolished in 1922 when the Irish Free State became largely independent.

== High Sheriffs of County Louth ==
- 1234: Ralph de Pitchford
- 1270–1272: John de Pitchford
- 1274: John de Baskervill
- 1275: Roger de Crumba
- 1281–1284: Nicholas de Netterville
- 1285–1291: William de Spineto
- 1287: Nicholas de Netterville
- 1291: Thomas de Stanley
- 1293: Richard Taaffe
- 1297: William de Hatch
- 1310: William Dowdall
- 1311: Richard Gernon (murdered)
- 1315: Richard Taaffe
- 1329: Geoffrey de Brandwade
- 1331: John Gernon
- 1346: James Audley
- 1355: John Clinton, or Clintoun (also Escheator for Louth)
- 1375: John Dowdall
- 1377: John Taaffe
- 1381: Peter Peppard
- 1385: Milo Haddesor
- 1386: George Telyng
- 1400: Thomas Talbot
- 1401: Walter Plunkett
- 1402: John Clynton of Keppock
- 1403: Sir John Bedilowe, Kt
- 1405: John Dowdall (killed)
- 1407: John Cusack
- 1408: John Cusack
- 1410: Walter Plunkett (second term)
- 1424: Sir James White
- 1425: Sir John Bellew, Kt
- 1426: John Bellew
- 1427: John Bellew
- 1440: Sir Nicholas Taaffe
- 1496: Patrick Plunkett
- 1497: Richard Plunkett
- 1499: John Gernon of Killencoole
- 1558: Edward Gernon of Gernonstown
- 1562: Sir John Bellew
- 1578: Roger Gernon or Garland
- 1593: Thomas Gernon
- 1594: Roger Gernon
- 1595: Rice Jones
- 1596: Rice Jones

== 17th century ==
- 1613: Ambrose Jones
- 1634: James Clinton of Clintonstown
- 1640: Bartholomew White
- 1642: Anthony Townley
- 1643: Anthony Townley
- 1644: Anthony Townley
- 1655: William Taylor
- 1656: William Toxteth
- 1657: James Smallwood
- 1658:
- 1659: John Ruxton
- 1660: John Ruxton
- 1661: John Fowke
- 1662: Nicholas Moore
- 1663: Sir James Graham
- 1664: Sir Thomas Bramhall, 1st Baronet
- 1665: Thomas Toxteth
- 1666: Wolstan Dixie
- 1667: Arthur Brownlow
- 1668: Major James Garstin
- 1669: William Armitage
- 1670: William Disney
- 1671: Henry Bellingham
- 1672: Henry Townley
- 1673: William Peppard
- 1674: John Ruxton
- 1675: John Thomlinson
- 1676: Timothy Armitage / Thomas Franke
- 1677: James Smallwood
- 1678: James Smallwood
- 1679: John Pepper
- 1680: Nehemiah Donellan
- 1681:
- 1682: Robert Moore
- 1683: Robert Moore (2nd year)
- 1684: Thomas Bellingham / John Holt
- 1685: Norman Garstin
- 1686: Sir Patrick Bellew, 1st Baronet
- 1687: Roger Bellew
- 1688: Roger Bellew
- 1689: John Taaffe
- 1690: Thomas Bellingham
- 1691: Henry Tichbourne
- 1692: Joseph Tomlinson
- 1693: William Barron
- 1694: Blayney Townley
- 1695: William Render
- 1696: John Smith
- 1697: John Graham
- 1698: John Keating
- 1699:

== 18th century ==
- 1700: James Tisdall
- 1701: Joseph Tomlinson
- 1702: Timothy Armitage
- 1703: Edward Singleton
- 1704: William Stannus
- 1705: William Eccleston of Drumshallon
- 1706: Henry Tichbourne
- 1707: John Ruxton
- 1708: William Brabazon
- 1709: Thomas Fortescue
- 1710: Thomas Clarke
- 1711: William Fortescue
- 1712:
- 1713: James Leigh
- 1714: Peter Ludlow of Ardsallagh Castle
- 1715: William Aston of Beaulieu
- 1716: Thomas Tippin
- 1717: James Tisdall
- 1718: Robert Sibthorpe
- 1719: William Moore
- 1720: Randle Hern
- 1721: Ephraim Dawson / Thomas Tipping / James Stannus
- 1722: George Ball
- 1723: John Pepper of Pepper's Town
- 1724: Nicholas Moore of Ardastowne
- 1725: Stephen Sibthorpe
- 1726: Harry Townley
- 1727: Thomas Fortescue
- 1728: William Ruxton of Ardee
- 1729: Brabazon Newcomen
- 1730: Brabazon Eccleston of Drumshallon
- 1731: Wallop Brabazon of Killelly
- 1732: Richard Hansard of Peghanstown
- 1733: John Sotheby
- 1734: Henry Bellingham jnr of Castle Bellingham
- 1735: James Wallace
- 1736: Robert Parkinson
- 1737: John Taaffe
- 1738: John Graham
- 1739: Thomas Tennison of Thomastown
- 1740: Rt Hon William Graham of Castlering
- 1741: James Poe of Dromgoldstown
- 1742: Tichborne Aston
- 1743: John Harper of Mell
- 1744: Trevor Stannus of Stannus Hill
- 1745: Thomas Tipping of Castletown
- 1746: William Henry Fortescue, 1st Earl of Clermont
- 1747: William Lee
- 1748: Ephraim Stannus of Carlingford
- 1749: Arthur Craven of Dromcashill
- 1750: Edward Smith of Maine
- 1751: William Brabazon of Willville
- 1752: Ross Moore of Carlingford
- 1753: Oliver Plunkett of Louth Hall
- 1754: William Foster of Dunleare
- 1755: James Fortescue
- 1756: Robert Sibthorpe
- 1757: James Hamilton, 2nd Earl of Clanbrassill
- 1758: Anthony Foster of Dunleare
- 1759: Robert Ball of Priorstown
- 1760: Latham Blacker
- 1761: Blayney Townley Balfour of Townley Hall
- 1762: Edward Tipping of Ballraggin
- 1763: Anthony Garstin of Bragganstown
- 1764: William Eccleston of Termafikin
- 1765: Thomas Newcomen of Callistown
- 1766: Richard Dawson jnr of Atherdee
- 1767: Charles Craven of Applefield
- 1768: John McClintock
- 1769: John Foster of Collon
- 1770: Thomas Fortescue of Dromiskin
- 1771: Blayney Townley Balfour of Townley Hall
- 1772: William Eccleston of Drumshallon
- 1773: William Filgate of Lissreny
- 1774: John Bowes Benson of Catherine Grove
- 1775: Samuel Poe of Poe's Court
- 1776: John William Foster of Rosy Park
- 1777: Edward Smith Stafford of Maine
- 1778: Thomas Lee of Tullykeel
- 1779: William Shiels of Newtown Darver
- 1780: Philip Brabazon of Belleview
- 1781: Henry Bellingham of Castle Bellingham
- 1782: John Thomas Foster of Dunleer
- 1783: Richard Cooper of Rathescar
- 1784: Henry Coddington of Dunleer
- 1785: Charles Cobbe of Dowdstown
- 1786: Thomas James Fortescue of Ravensdale
- 1787: Matthew Fortescue of Stephenstown
- 1788: James Tisdall of Bawn
- 1789: Turner Camac of Greenmount Lodge
- 1790: Henry Foster of Green Mount
- 1791: Thomas William Filgate of Arthurstown
- 1792: Hon. Mathew Plunkett of Charlestown
- 1793: Blayney Townley Balfour of Townley Hall
- 1794: Francis Manning of Drakestown
- 1795: Nicholas Coddington
- 1796: John Burne jnr
- 1797: William Latham Blacker Hamlin of Rath Esker Lodge
- 1798: John McClintock jnr of Drumcar
- 1799: Wallop Brabazon of Rath

== 19th century ==
- 1800: Chichester Fortescue
- 1801: Turner Macan of Greenmount Lodge
- 1802: John Strahan of Dundalk
- 1804: Francis Eastwood of Killincoole
- 1805: Francis Eastwood of Killincoole
- 1806: John Bolton of Maine
- 1807: Alexander Filgate of Lisrenny
- 1808: John Page of Dundalk
- 1809: Robert Thompson of Anagassan
- 1810: Henry Brabazon of Dromiskin
- 1811: Right Hon. Thomas Henry Foster of Collon
- 1812: Hon Robert Jocelyn, Viscount Jocelyn replaced by Charles Eastwood of Castletown
- 1813: Philip Pendleton of Dromgooldstown
- 1814: Matthew Fortescue of Stephenstown
- 1815: George Shiels Eccleston of Dromiskin
- 1816: Brabazon Disney Shiel of Newtown Darver
- 1817: Turner Macan of Greenmount, Castlebellingham
- 1818: Faithful Fortescue of Conderry
- 1819: William Parkinson Ruxton of Red House
- 1820: Thomas Lee Norman of Corbollis
- 1821: Faithful William Fortescue of Miltown Grange
- 1822: Thomas Tisdall
- 1823: John Fitzherbert Ruxton of Ardee House
- 1824: James Thomas Townley Tisdall of Bawn
- 1825: Nathaniel Manning of Drakestown
- 1826: John Woolsey of Milestown, Castlebellingham
- 1827: Robert Portland, of Blackhail, Drogheda
- 1828: Berkeley Buckingham Stafford
- 1829: Sir Alan Edward Bellingham, 3rd Baronet of Castlebellingham
- 1830: Turner Macan of Greenmount, Castlebellingham
- 1831: Patrick Bellew, 1st Baron Bellew of Barmeath
- 1832: William Filgate of Lisrenny
- 1833: Edward Tipping of Bellurgan Park
- 1834: Francis Donagh of Newtown
- 1835: George Taaffe of Smarmore Castle
- 1836: Mathew O'Reilly of Thomastown
- 1837: Henry Chester of Cartown, Drogheda
- 1838: Michael Chester of Stone House
- 1839: Thomas Fortescue, 1st Baron Clermont of Dromisken
- 1840: John McClintock, 1st Baron Rathdonnell
- 1841: Blaney Balfour jnr of Townley Hall, Dunleer
- 1842: Robert Jocelyn, Viscount Jocelyn of Dundalk
- 1843: Samuel McClintock of Newtown, Drogheda
- 1844: Sir Richard Robinson, 2nd Baronet of Rokeby Hall, Dunleer
- 1845: Frederick J. Foster, Castle Ring
- 1846: Lewis Upton of Glyde Farm, Ardee
- 1847: William Ruxton of Ardee House, Ardee
- 1848: Miles William O'Reilly of Knockabbey Castle, Louth
- 1849: Sir John Stephen Robinson, 3rd Baronet of Rokeby Hall, Dunleer
- 1850: Sir Frederick George Foster, 2nd Baronet
- 1851: George Ruxton of Rahanna, Ardee
- 1852: John Murphy of Castletown, Dundalk
- 1853: Richard Macan of Greenmount, Castlebellingham
- 1854: Edward Joseph Bellew, 2nd Baron Bellew of Barmeath
- 1855: Richard Thomas Montgomery of Beaulieu, Drogheda
- 1856: Myles Taaffe of Smarmore, Ardee
- 1857: Matthew O'Reilly Dease of Charleville, Dunleer
- 1858: Michael Carraher of Cardistown, Ardee
- 1859: Arthur Blackburn of Corderry, Ardee
- 1860: Laurence Waldron of Ballybrack Dalkey, Co. Dublin
- 1861: Lieut.-Col. John Charles William Fortescue of Stephenstown, Dundalk
- 1862: Henry Edward Singletown of Hazley Heath, Hampshire
- 1863: Charles Brinsley Marlay
- 1864: Edward Singleton Belpatrick, Collon
- 1865: Henry St. George Smith of Piperstown, Drogheda
- 1866: St. Clair Kilburn Mulholland, of Kelburn
- 1867: Charles Cobbe of Newbridge, Donabate
- 1868: William Woolsey of The Crescent, Castlebellingham
- 1869: Ralph Smyth of Newtown House, Drogheda
- 1870: James Hugh Smith-Barry
- 1871: Richard Altamont Smythe of Newtown, Drogheda
- 1872: John Arthur Henry Moore-Brabazon
- 1873: Robert Foster Dunlop of Monasterboice Ho., Collon
- 1874: Thomas Mahon Richardson of Prospect, Dundalk
- 1875: John Frederick Foster of Glyde Court, Ardee
- 1876: Percy Fitzgerald of Fane Valley, Dundalk
- 1877: Arthur Pemberton Heywood Lonsdale
- 1878: John Taafe of Smarmoor Castle
- 1879: William de Salis Filgate of Lissrenny
- 1880: John R. Garstin
- 1881: John Alexander Lee-Norman of Corbollis, Ardee
- 1882: Arthur Macan of Drumcashel, Castlebellingham
- 1883: Conway Edward Dobbs
- 1884: Philip Callan of Dowdstown, Ardee
- 1885: Blayney Reynell Townley Balfour of Townley Hall, Drogheda
- 1886: Thomas Plunkett Cairnes Stameen, Drogheda
- 1887: George Charles Smyth of Newtown, Drogheda
- 1888: Malcolm Brown Murray of Roden Place, Dundalk
- 1889: Major-General O'Brien Bellingham Woolsey of Milestown, Castlebellingham
- 1890: Patrick Ternan of Listoke, Drogheda.
- 1891: John Coleman Kiernan of Rathbrist, Drogheda.
- 1892: Patrick Casey Connolly of Beaulieu, Drogheda.
- 1893: Henry Chester of Williamstown, Castlebellingham.
- 1894: Edmond O'Conor of Charleville, Dunleer.
- 1895: Charles Bertram Bellew, 3rd Baron Bellew of Barmeath.
- 1896: Major James Patrick Waldron
- 1897: Alan Henry Bellingham, 4th Baronet.
- 1898: Sir Gerald Collingwood Robinson, 4th Baronet of Rokeby Hall, Dunleer.
- 1899: Henry J. Daly of Donacarney House, Drogheda.

== 20th century ==
- 1900: Capt. Mark Singleton.
- 1901: Sir Augustus Vere Foster, 4th Baronet of Glyde Court, Ardee.
- 1902: George Leopold Bryan, 4th Baron Bellew of Barmeath.
- 1903: Major Matthew Charles Edward Fortescue of Stephenstown, Dundalk.
- 1904: William Bellingham Jameson of Beaulieu, Drogheda.
- 1905: Richard Walter Walsh of Williamstown, Castlebellingham.
- 1906: John Roland Singleton of Mell, Drogheda
- 1907: George Joseph Taaffe of Smarmore Castle.
- 1908: Blayney Reynall Townley Balfour of Townley Hall, Drogheda.
- 1909: John James Eastwood Bigger of Falmore Hall, Dundalk.
- 1910: Richard Johnston Montgomery of Killineer House, Drogheda.
- 1911: Alfred Bellingham Cairnes of Listoke, Drogheda.
- 1912: John Dobbin Bell of Killin, Dundalk.
- 1913: Maxwell Thomas Moore-Boyle of Dundalk.
- 1914: Captain George Knaggs of Corderry.
- 1915: William Townley George Seymour Macartney-Filgate.
- 1916: Thomas William Bell of Dundalk.
- 1917: Thomas Callan Macardle of Dundalk.
- 1918: Charles Davis Guinness of Dundalk.
