= Edmund Ashfield (disambiguation) =

Edmund Ashfield (fl. 1660–1690) was an English painter.

Edmund Ashfield may also refer to:

- Edmund Ashfield (Catholic agent) (1576–c. 1620), English Catholic
- Edmund Ashfield (MP) (died 1578), MP for Wallingford
