= Joseph Weld =

Joseph Weld may refer to:

- Captain Joseph Weld (1599-1646), Weld family#Joseph Weld, ancestor of many Boston Welds
- Joseph Weld (yachtsman), English yachtsman (1777–1863), brother of Cardinal Thomas Weld
- Joseph Weld (MP) (1651–1712), MP for Bury St Edmunds 1709–1712
- Joseph Weld (priest) (?–1781), Archdeacon of Ross
- Joseph William Weld (1909–1992), British army officer and landowner
