= Richard Stephens (judge) =

Irish judge & politician (c.1630–1692)

Sir Richard Stephens (c. 1630–1692) was an Irish barrister, politician and judge of the seventeenth century. He was a highly successful lawyer, who made a fortune at the Bar, but his judicial career was hampered by his unorthodox religious and political views. He became Serjeant-at-law (Ireland) under King Charles II, but was dismissed from office after only two years. He was in political disgrace during the following reign. After the Glorious Revolution he was appointed to the Irish High Court bench, but he died only two years later.

== Early years ==
He was born in Wexford, the son of Richard Stephens senior. He entered Lincoln's Inn in 1658 and the King's Inn in 1663. He became one of the most successful practitioners at the Irish Bar, and was made Recorder of Waterford and Clonmel. In 1665 he was elected to the Irish House of Commons as member for Ardee, after the expulsion of the previous member, John Chambers.

== Popish Plot ==
In the autumn of 1678 the great wave of anti-Catholic hysteria which is popularly known as the Popish Plot, sparked by the invention by the informer Titus Oates of a wholly fictitious Jesuit conspiracy to murder the King, broke out in England, and the Plot also gained credence in Ireland. At that time several Irish judges and Law Officers, who were aware of the King's own leaning towards the Roman Catholic religion, openly admitted their own Catholic beliefs, even though Irish office holders were in theory disqualified if they admitted to practising that faith. The Lord Lieutenant of Ireland, James Butler, 1st Duke of Ormonde, although himself a staunch Anglican, had pursued a policy of unofficial religious toleration towards Roman Catholics. By 1679 however public opinion demanded the appointment to office of men of staunchly Protestant views: and Stephens was a political client of Anthony Ashley Cooper, 1st Earl of Shaftesbury, who had used the Popish Plot to become effective Leader of the Opposition in the English Parliament. Ormonde, despite his personal antipathy to Stephens, now recommended him to the King as a man who was worth promoting: Stephens met the King at Portsmouth and was given a knighthood.

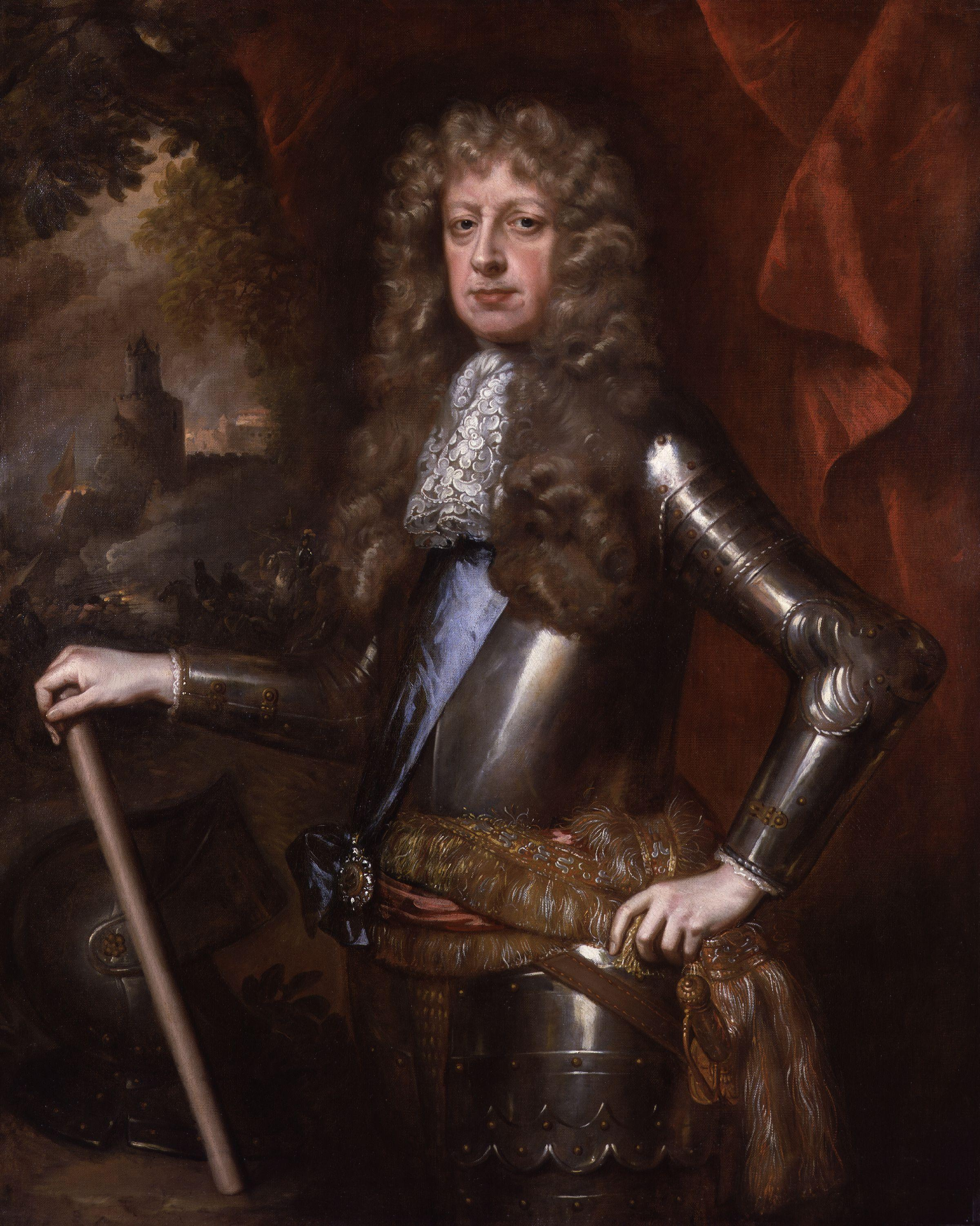
James Butler, 1st Duke of Ormonde- he distrusted Stephens, but nonetheless recommended him for judicial office

== Office ==
His career did not advance as quickly as he could have hoped: he failed in his efforts to become Master of the Rolls in Ireland, Solicitor General for Ireland, or Chief Baron of the Irish Exchequer. He finally achieved public office as Second Serjeant-at-law in 1680. He went as a judge of assize in the north-west of Ireland, and apparently planned to enter the English House of Commons.

== Dismissal ==
The waning of popular belief in the Popish Plot in the early 1680s, and the downfall of Stephens's patron Lord Shaftesbury, who was forced to flee from England in 1682 and died in exile in Amsterdam early the following year, made Stephens's position precarious. Ormonde was noted for his deep-seated loyalty to his friends, who included most of the Irish judiciary, but he seems to have disliked Stephens. Stephens was dismissed from the office of King's Serjeant late in 1682 at Ormonde's request, on the grounds that he was a "fanatic", i.e. a non-conforming Protestant (Ormonde's policy of religious tolerance clearly had limits).

Stephens complained bitterly that he had lost £1000 a year as a result of his dismissal from office: although the nominal salary of a Serjeant was fixed a few years later at £30 a year, there is a good deal of evidence that the perquisites of the office brought the actual income up to roughly the figure which Stephens mentioned, although the matter is complicated by the fact that a Serjeant could also continue with his private practice. Stephens may have derived some ironic amusement from the fiasco which followed his removal, as no less than three candidates- William Beckett, Sir Richard Ryves and Sir John Lyndon- claimed that they had been promised his job. Ormonde, whose indifference to the question of who held the office of Serjeant was largely responsible for the difficulty, felt it necessary to create a new office of Third Serjeant to satisfy the rivals, even though it was generally believed that there was not enough work for the existing two Serjeants.

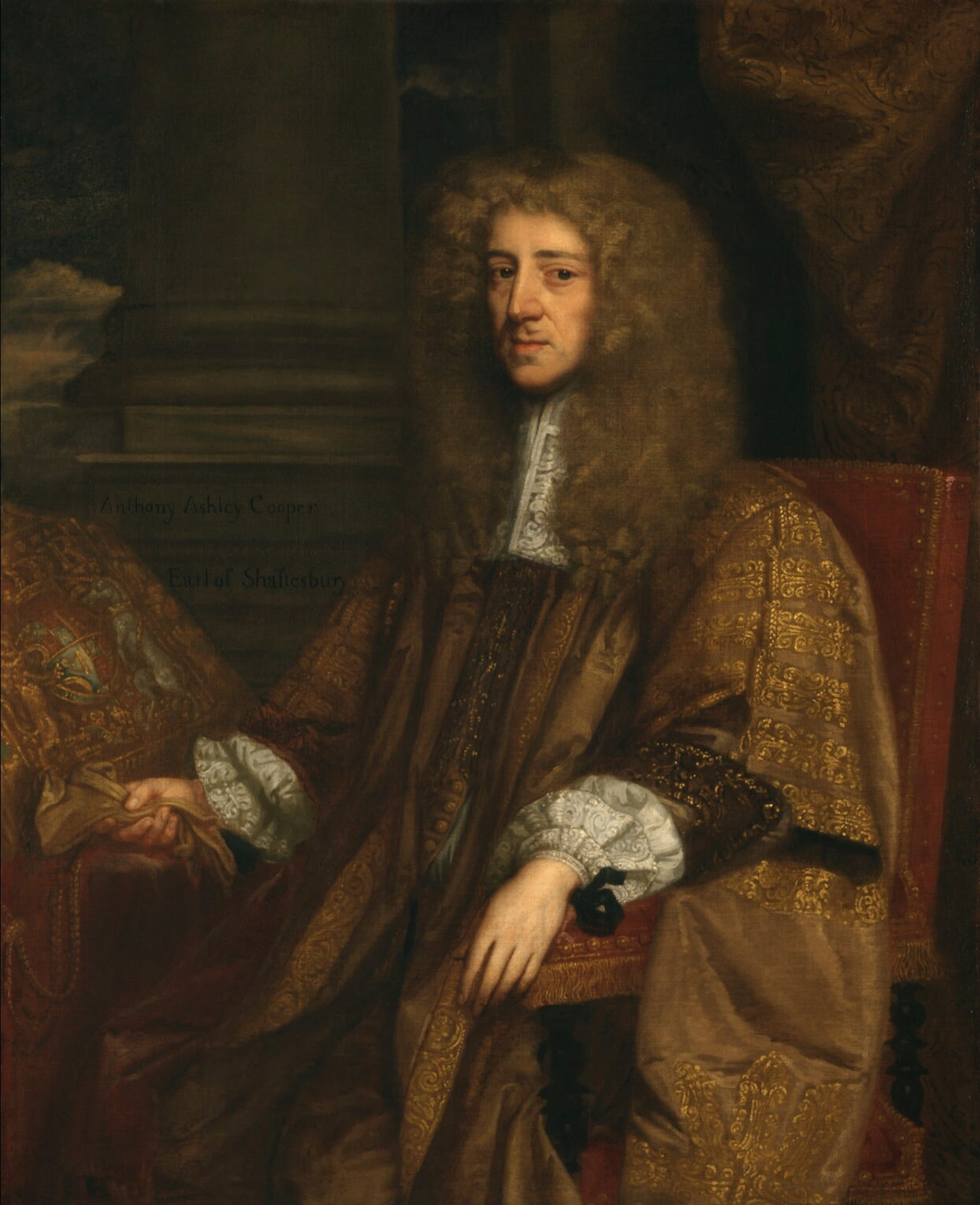
Anthony Ashley Cooper, 1st Earl of Shaftesbury, who was Stephens's patron.

It has been suggested that Stephens's dismissal set the precedent for the policy later adopted by King James II, which entailed the wholesale dismissal of judges and other office-holders for holding the "wrong" religious opinions.

== Last years ==
He became a bitter opponent of King James II, and like many of the King's Irish opponents, he fled to England after James arrived in Ireland in 1689. He was proscribed as one of the King's known enemies by the Patriot Parliament of 1689.

After James' downfall, he was restored to his old office of Second Serjeant. He continued to reside mainly in England: although he was appointed a justice of the Court of King's Bench (Ireland) in 1690, he did not sit regularly as a judge, possibly due to failing health. He died in 1692.

== See also ==
- Glorious Revolution
- Popish Plot
