= Viscount Kilwarden =

Extinct title in the Peerage of Ireland

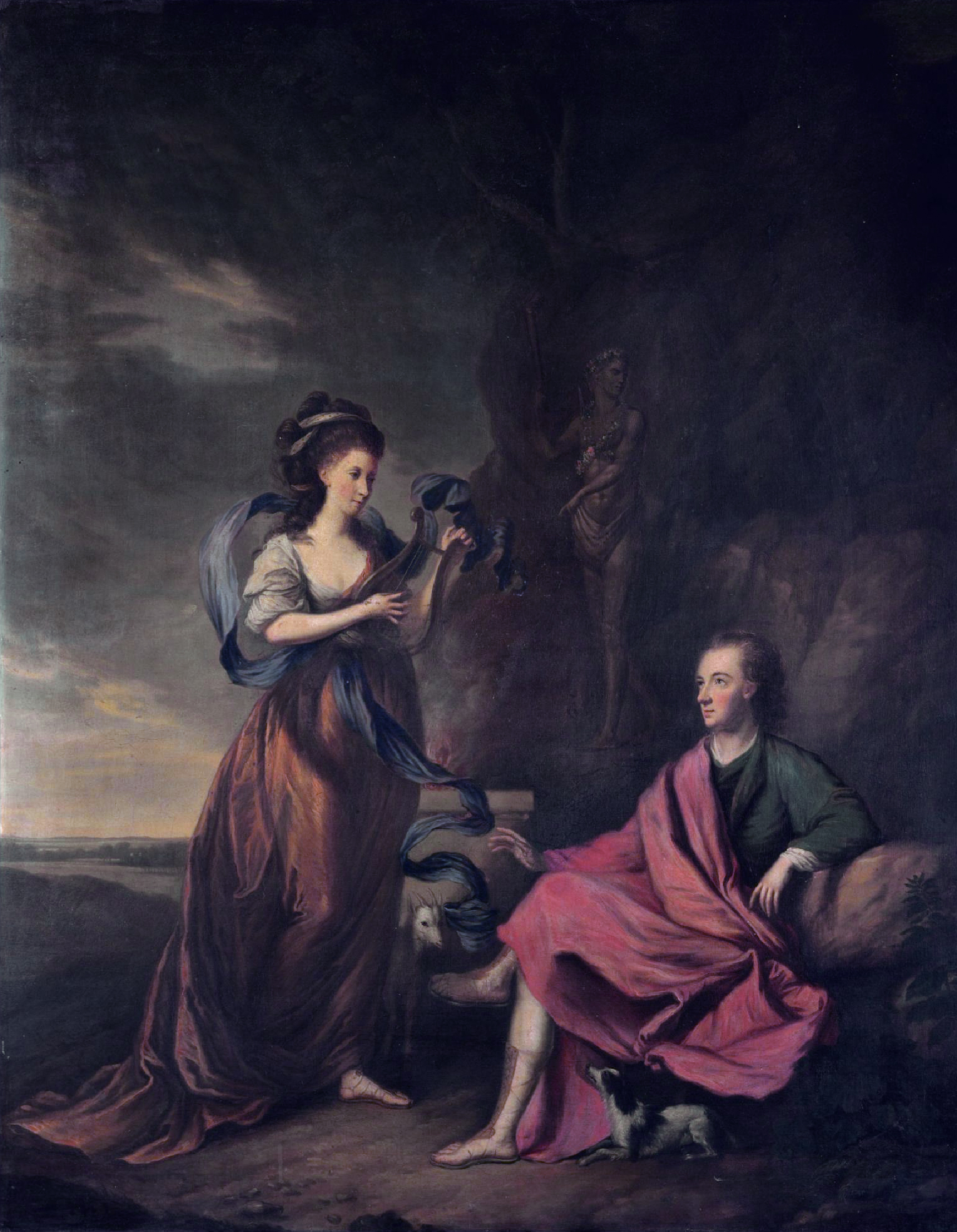
Arthur Wolfe, 1st Viscount Kilwarden and his wife Anne, by Thomas Hickey, 1769.

Viscount Kilwarden, of Kilwarden in the County of Kildare, was a title in the Peerage of Ireland. It was created on 29 December 1800 for Arthur Wolfe, 1st Baron Kilwarden, Lord Chief Justice of the King's Bench for Ireland. He had already been created Baron Kilwarden, of Newlands in the County of Dublin, on 3 July 1798, also in the Peerage of Ireland. Furthermore, his wife Anne, daughter of William Ruxton of Ardee, County Louth, by Mary, daughter of Samuel Gibbons, had in 1795 been raised to the Peerage of Ireland in honour of her husband as Lady Kilwarden, Baroness of Kilteel in the County of Kildare. Lord Kilwarden was killed in 1803 during the Irish Rebellion of 1803 where he was dragged from his carriage and piked to death.

He was succeeded by his eldest son, the second Viscount. The following year he also succeeded his mother as second Baron Kilwarden of the 1795 creation. All three titles became extinct on his death in 1830.

== Viscounts Kilwarden (1800) ==
- Arthur Wolfe, 1st Viscount Kilwarden (1739–1803)
- John Wolfe, 2nd Viscount Kilwarden (1769–1830)

== Barons Kilwarden (1795) ==
- Anne Wolfe, 1st Baroness Kilwarden (died 1804)
- John Wolfe, 2nd Baron Kilwarden (1769–1830) (had succeeded as Viscount Kilwarden in 1803)
