= Garret Morphy =

Irish painter

Garret Morphy (c. 1655 – c. 1716) was an Irish painter who is considered to be Ireland's first recorded professional artist.

== Early life ==
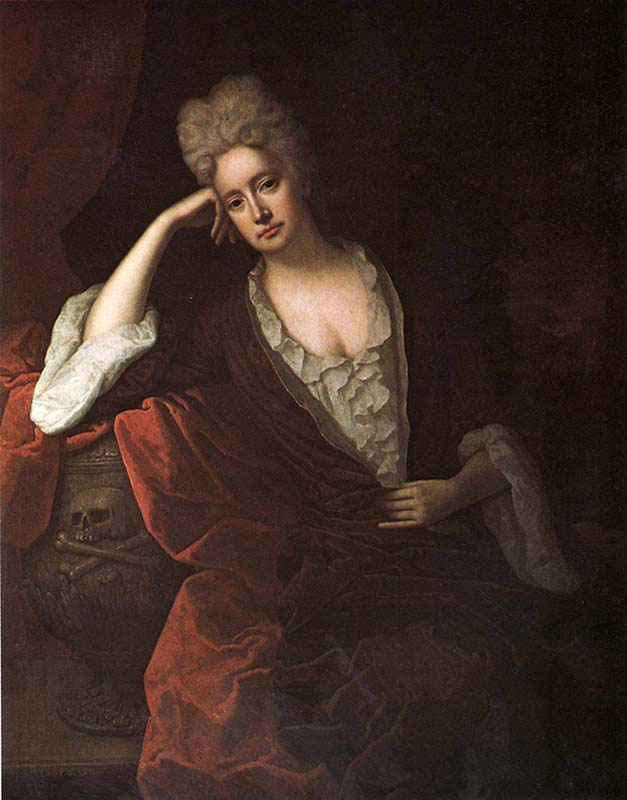
Portrait of Lady O'Neill

Portrait of James Bryan of Jenkinstown Park, County Kilkenny, Oil on Panel, 26 x 21.1 in. / 66 x 53.5 cm.

Little is known about Garret Morphy's origins and personal life. He is assumed to be of Irish birth, however there were Morphys in London, Dublin and elsewhere in Ireland in the 17th century. In his will he was described as "of the city of Dublin, painter". The first documented mention of him is in 1673 when he was an assistant to the Catholic artist Edmund Ashfield, in London. At this time he was probably about 18 years old.

== Career ==
Morphy's earliest work are from around 1676 and his style of portrait painting suggests he studied under the Flemish portrait painter, Gaspar Smitz, who painted the Irish aristocracy in the 1660s and 1670s. Morphy was a Catholic and was known to move between London and Dublin, painting portraits of established Catholic families, the colonial hierarchy and army officers. It is thought he may have visited the Netherlands and France as his paintings reflected the newest artistic trends. Morphy appears to have moved around constantly during this period, making it difficult to ascertain how much time he spent in Ireland.

He painted a portrait of the Catholic Archbishop of Dublin, Oliver Plunket, who was executed at Tyburn in 1681. Morphy is known to have been in Yorkshire and Northumberland between 1685 and 1688 during which time he completed a portrait of the Duke of Newcastle amongst others. He was a quick and prolific portrait painter. His importance perhaps lies in the fact that he recorded the “remnants of a once powerful social grouping that was passing out of Irish history.” He returned to Ireland around 1689, moving in the same circles as the O'Neills, the Talbots, and the Bellews. Many of the people Morphy painted were subsequently killed or lost their estates in the Williamite war. After the war, Morphy's commissions came from Protestant landed gentry.

Morphy painted in a rapid technique, lending a softness to the features of his subjects. At least 70 portraits are attributed to his studio, painted over 30 years. His female subjects were often posed in the same way, with their head resting on their right hand with a "dreamy gaze". Male subjects were posed with their body twisted away from the viewer, with the right hand across the torso.

== Death and legacy ==
Garret Morphy died between November 1715 and May 1716. His will was proved on 12 May 1716. His nephew Edmond Moore appears to have inherited the remnants of his studio. He is said to have raised the practise of Irish portrait painting to a new and professional level.

Some of his works hang in the National Gallery of Ireland and the National Portrait Gallery in London.
