= Ardee (Parliament of Ireland constituency) =

Pre-1801 Irish constituency

- Former borough constituency for the Irish House of Commons
- County: County Louth
- Borough: Ardee

1378–1801
- Seats: 2
- Replaced by: Disfranchised

Ardee was a constituency represented in the Irish House of Commons from 1378 to 1801.

== History ==
Ardee in County Louth was enfranchised as a borough constituency in 1378. In 1665 the Lord Lieutenant (James Butler, 1st Duke of Ormonde) wrote to the Portreeve of Ardee recommending Sir Robert Byron, as Burgess in Parliament for Ardee, in the room of Captain John Chambers, "removed" and Colonel Brent Moore, in the "stead of Lieutenant John Ruxton, removed". In the Patriot Parliament of 1689 summoned by King James II, Ardee was represented by two members. It continued to send two Members of Parliament to the Irish House of Commons until the Parliament of Ireland was merged into the Parliament of the United Kingdom on 1 January 1801. The constituency was disenfranchised on 31 December 1800.

The borough was represented in the House of Commons of the United Kingdom as part of the county constituency of Louth.

== Electoral system and electorate ==
The parliamentary representatives of the borough were elected using the bloc vote for two-member elections and first past the post for single-member by-elections.

A summary of the borough electorate was included in Lewis's Topographical Dictionary of Ireland, 1837. The electorate consisted of the members of the Borough Corporation (the local Council) and the freemen. All of the classes of electors qualified because of co-option by all or part of the existing ones, so this was a constituency with an oligarchic constitution rather than a democratic one.

== Members of Parliament ==
- 1559–1559: Walter Dowdall and Walter Babe
- 1585–1586: John Dowdall and Robert Barnewall
- 1613–1615: Patrick Dowdall and Barnabas Matthew
- 1634–1635: John Dowdall and Thomas Kippaks (Cappock)
- 1639–1643: Henry Moore (succeeded to peerage 1643 and replaced by Raphael Hunt)
- 1661–1665: John Ruxton (expelled and replaced 1665 by Erasmus Smith) and John Chambers (expelled and replaced by Sir Richard Stephens)
- 1665–1666: Erasmus Smith and Sir Richard Stephens

=== 1689–1801 ===
Election	First member	First party	Second member	Second party
1689	Hugh Gernon		John Babe	
1692	Henry Tichborne		James Tisdall	
1695	Brabazon Moore		James Tisdall	
1703	Robert Chambre		James Tisdall	
1713	Michael Tisdall		James Tisdall	
1715	Michael Tisdall		William Moore	
1727	Robert Parkinson		John Donnellan	
1741	Robert Parkinson		Tichborne Aston	
1748	Robert Parkinson		William Ruxton	
1751	Robert Parkinson		John Ruxton	
1761	Charles Ruxton		John Ruxton	
1768	George Lowther		John Ruxton	
1776	Francis McNamara		Peter Metge	
1783	John Ruxton		Charles Ruxton	
1785	William Ruxton		Charles Ruxton	
1790	William Parkinson Ruxton		John Wolfe (Note: Styled as The Honourable from 1795)	
1798	Charles Ruxton		William Ruxton	
1799	William Parkinson Ruxton		William Ruxton	
1801	Disenfranchised			

== Bibliography ==
- O'Hart, John (2007). The Irish and Anglo-Irish Landed Gentry: When Cromwell came to Ireland. Vol. II. Heritage Books. ISBN 978-0-7884-1927-0.
- Leigh Rayment's historical List of Members of the Irish House of Commons. Cites: Johnston-Liik, Edith Mary (2002). The History of the Irish Parliament 1692-1800 (6 volumes). Ulster Historical Foundation.
