= Ardraly =

Ardraly Irish: Ard Ráile
- townland
- Ardraly shown within Ireland
- Coordinates: 51°32′08″N 9°20′29″W
- Country: Ireland
- County: County Cork
- Barony: Carbery West
- Civil parish: Aghadown
- First recorded: Early 17th Century

Area
  - Total: 192 ha (475 acres)

Ardraly (Irish: Ard Ráile) is a townland located in the barony of West Carbery, in County Cork, Ireland. Archival records of 1601 list Ardrawly from the Calendar to Fiants of reign of Henry VIII.

Historical sites include a church, country house, earthwork and a souterrain. The church site is labeled as Kilnamorahaun on 19th century maps.

== See also ==
- List of townlands of the barony of West Carbery (East Division)
