= Joseph Weld (priest) =

Irish Anglican priest

Joseph Weld was Archdeacon of Ross from 1777 to his death in 1781.

Rickard was born in Dublin and educated at Trinity College there. He held livings at Tullagh, Creagh, Caheragh and Dromdaleague. He was Treasurer of Cork Cathedral from 1775 to 1776.
