= Henry Tichborne, 1st Baron Ferrard =

Irish Baron

Henry Tichborne, 1st Baron Ferrard (1663 – 3 November 1731), known as Sir Henry Tichborne, Bt, between 1697 and 1715, was an Irish peer.

Tichborne was the eldest son of Sir William Tichborne of Beaulieu, County Louth and his wife Judith Bysse, daughter of John Bysse, Chief Baron of the Irish Exchequer and his wife Margaret King (née Edgeworth); his other grandfather being the statesman and general Sir Henry Tichborne, a younger son of the Tudor MP, Sir Benjamin Tichborne, 1st Baronet, of Tichborne (see Tichborne baronets). His paternal grandmother was Jane Newcomen, daughter of Sir Robert Newcomen. He represented Ardee and County Louth in the Irish House of Commons.

As an ardent supporter of the Glorious Revolution, he was created a Baronet, of Beaulieu in the County of Louth, in the Baronetage of England on 12 July 1697. In 1714 he was made a member of the Privy Council of Ireland. On 9 October 1715 he was raised to the Peerage of Ireland as Baron Ferrard, of Beaulieu in the County of Louth.

== Family ==
He married Arabella, daughter of Sir Robert Cotton and Hester Salusbury. They had four sons (William, Cotton, Robert & Henry), all of whom died before their father leaving no male issue, so that at his death in 1731 his titles became extinct. His only surviving daughter, Salisbury Tichborne, married in 1713 William Aston, MP for Dunleer, grandson of the prominent judge Sir William Aston, and had issue including Tichborne Aston MP. Their descendants still live at Beaulieu.

A younger son of Lord Ferrard, William, married in 1712 his close relative Charlotte Amelia Molesworth (daughter of Robert Molesworth, 1st Viscount Molesworth of Swords, who was half brother of Baron Ferrard through their mother Judith Bysse) and had two daughters, Arabella, who married Francis Wyatt and Wilhelmina. Charlotte Amelia was a Woman of the Bedchamber to Princess Caroline of Ansbach 1721-27. Another son Henry (1684-1709) married Mary Fowke but died of drowning, without issue.

His niece Judith Tichborne (died 1749) was the third wife of the leading English statesman Charles Spencer, 3rd Earl of Sunderland. Judith was the daughter of Ferrard's younger brother Sir Benjamin Tichborne and Elizabeth Gibbs. She and Sunderland had three children who all died young. After his death, she remarried the diplomat Sir Robert Sutton, and had surviving issue, including the statesman Sir Richard Sutton, 1st Baronet.

Lord Ferrard was largely responsible for the completion of Beaulieu House, the main Tichborne residence, in its present form, which had been begun by his grandfather, Sir Henry Tichborne in 1666.

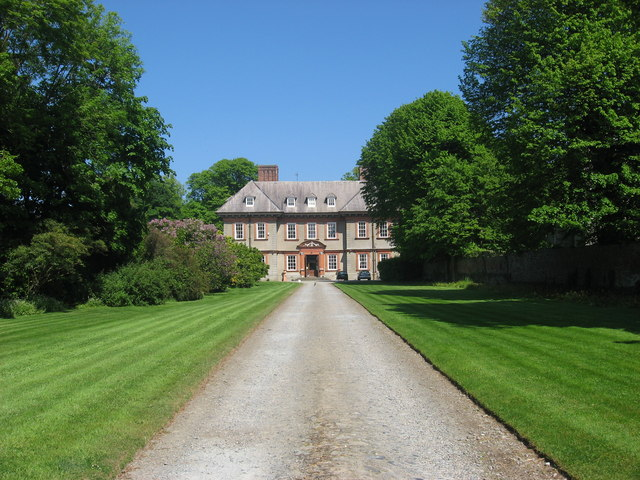
Beaulieu House

== See also ==
- Tichborne Baronets

Baronetage of England
New creation	Baronet (of Beaulieu); 1697–1731	Extinct
Peerage of Ireland
New creation	Baron Ferrard; 1715–1731	Extinct
