= Beaulieu House and Gardens =

Beaulieu House
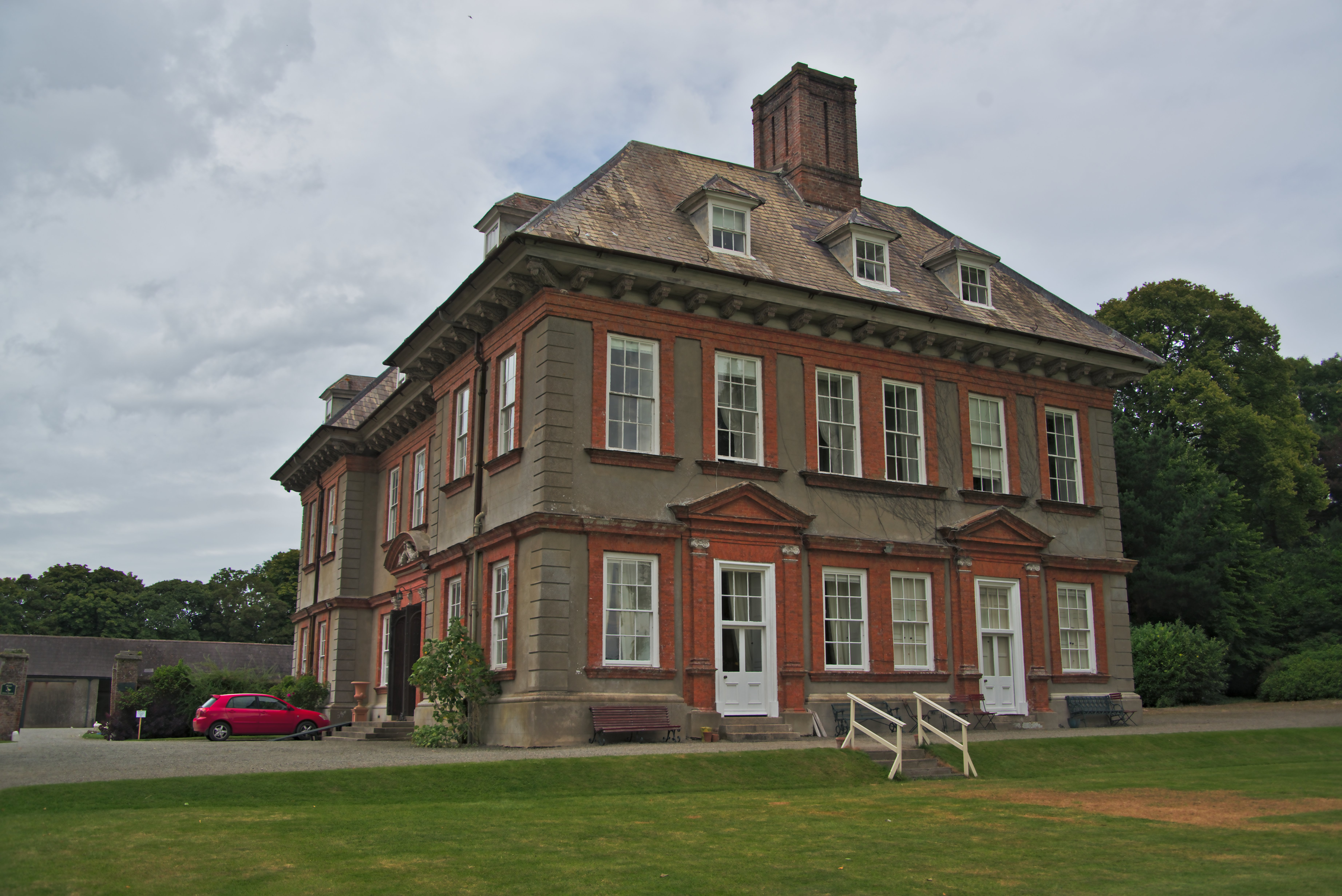
- Beaulieu House, County Louth

General information
- Type: Country house
- Architectural style: Queen Anne, Dutch style
- Classification: Protected structure (LHS025-002)
- Location: Beaulieu, near Drogheda, County Louth
- Coordinates: 53.72805°N 6.29358°W
- Estimated completion: c. 1715
- Client: Tichbourne family

Technical details
- Material: Likely imported red brick
- Floor count: 3

Design and construction
- Architect: Likely a Dutch architect

Website
- beaulieuhouse.ie

Beaulieu House and Gardens (/ˈbjuːli/) is an estate in Drogheda, County Louth, Ireland. It was once thought to have been built in the 1660s, although later research seems to suggest it was built around 1715 incorporating elements of an earlier structure, and it includes a terraced walled garden. It is located 2 miles (3.2 km) east of Drogheda less than half a mile from the estuary of the River Boyne.

It is one of the earliest surviving examples of an unfortified major house built in Ireland, and one of very few of the type built in the Dutch style. A similar surviving example is the Red House in Youghal, which was constructed around 1703.

== History ==
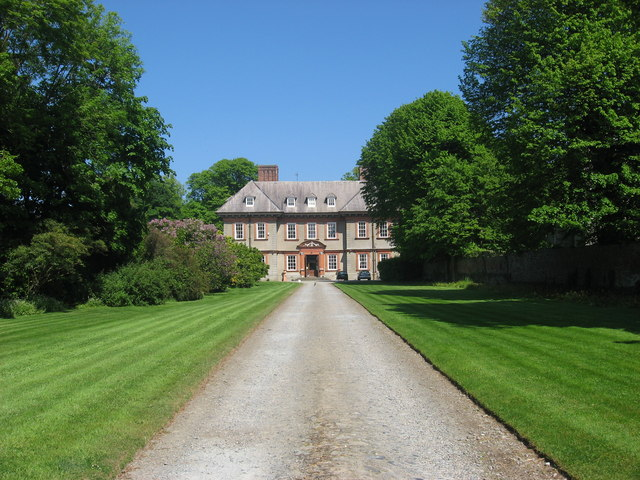
Beaulieu gardens

The original Irish Béilinn ('mouth of the pool') is descriptive of a place where the saltwater tidal pool narrows. The lands around the current Beaulieu were owned by the de Verdun family at the end of the 12th century. The Plunkett family, originally from Dublin, married into the de Verduns and became associated with the area from the early 14th century onwards.

The lands of Christopher Plunket, 2nd Earl of Fingall were confiscated by the English Commonwealth after the Confederate war in the mid-17th century.

The predecessor to the present house was a Jacobean manor house constructed in 1628.

Sir Benjamin Tichborne, 1st Baronet of England (c. 1540 – 6 September 1629), MP for Petersfield 1588-1589 and Hampshire 1593 had a younger son and judge, Sir Henry Tichborne who went on to defend the attempted siege of Drogheda in 1642 in the Irish Confederate Wars. Henry was awarded lands at Beaulieu in 1666 and the manor on which to rebuild if he wished and he did so with the input of two further generations.

His eldest son was Sir William Tichborne of Beaulieu whose eldest son was another Henry Tichborne who was made a Baronet (1697) and later Baron Ferrard of Beaulieu (1715); however, the younger Henry had no surviving sons though he did have a daughter who succeeded to Beaulieu. The family later intermarried with the family of Admiral Nelson. The house remains with descendants and the rural villages of Beaulieu Cross and Beltichburn in the nearby country was named after the house and them respectively.

The walled garden has 4 acres (1.6 ha) of formal plant landscape and a variety of horticulture.

As of 2021, the owner planned to install 20,000 photovoltaic panels generating 5 megawatts on 23 acres of the property.

== Tourism ==
=== Visitors ===
Guided tours of the estate are available on selected days during the summer months. The grounds and house also offer the ability to host weddings, trade shows, conferences or training days.

=== Motor racing museum ===
Gabriel De Freitas, the late owner who was in the 10th generation of the Tichbornes raced under the name Gabriel Konig, and was a prominent 1960s-1970s female racing driver. She collected classic racing and rally saloons alongside a few other classic luxury cars which form the motor racing museum. As such the venue has parallels to Beaulieu Abbey and its National Motor Museum in Hampshire in the United Kingdom.

== See also ==
- Stackallan House
