= William Aston (Jesuit) =

William Aston (1735–1800), was an English Jesuit.

Dr. Oliver believed Aston to be the son of Edward Aston, by Ann Bayley his wife. He was born in London on 22 April 1735. He made his early studies in the college of St. Omer, and at the age of sixteen he joined the Society of Jesus at Watten (7 September 1751). In 1761 he was professor of poetry at St. Omer. He was admitted to his solemn profession in his order 2 February 1769. His commanding talents and accomplished manners recommended him for the presidency of the Little College at Bruges. On its violent suppression by the Belgic-Austrian privy council of Brussels, he was detained a close prisoner for eight months; he and his companions were ultimately released, owing to the exertions of Henry Arundell, 8th Baron Arundell of Wardour, who interceded with Prince Staremberg, the Austrian prime minister, on their behalf. A few years later Father Aston established an academy at Liège, and he obtained a canonry in the collegiate church of St. John in that city. He died 15 March 1800. Besides writing for reviews and journals, Father Aston published D'Azais' 'Compte-rendu,' 'Lettres Ultramontaines,' and 'Le Cosmopolite.'
