= Charles Ruxton =

Charles Ruxton (1726–1806) was an Irish MP and landowner in Ardee, County Louth.

A younger son of William Ruxton, he and his elder brother John Ruxton represented Ardee in the Irish House of Commons.

He married Elizabeth, daughter and heiress of Robert Parkinson, who had also been an MP for Ardee. They inherited his estate of the Red House, Ardee, which on Ruxton's death passed to their son William Parkinson Ruxton.
