= Michael Tisdall =

Irish Anglican priest

Michael Tisdall (1730–1788) was Archdeacon of Ross from 1781 to 1788.

Tisdall was the son of the Reverend George Tisdall and Frances Canning. His mother was of the same family as Baron Garvagh and the statesman George Canning, and his father, through his grandmother Frances Fitzgerald, was a distant cousin of the Earl of Kildare. He was born in Dublin and educated at Trinity College there. He was ordained on 15 November 1753 and began his ecclesiastical career with a curacy at his father's church, St Mary, Shandon. After another curacy at Ballymoney he held livings at Kinneagh, Kilmaloda, Tullagh, Creagh. He was Vicar choral of Cork Cathedral from 1778 to 1781; and Prebendary of Dromdaleague in 1781.

He married Elizabeth Farran, daughter of Thomas Farran. His son Fitzgerald Tisdall was Rector of Kilmoe. Fitzgerald was murdered by robbers in 1809 on the road between Bantry and Kenmare. One of the killers, Michael Murphy, was hanged for the crime.
