= Henry Boyle-Walsingham =

Irish politician (1729–1756)

Henry Boyle-Walsingham (c. 1729 – 27 March 1756) was an Irish Member of Parliament.

He was a younger son of Henry Boyle, 1st Earl of Shannon by his wife Henrietta, daughter of Charles Boyle, 2nd Earl of Burlington.

He represented Tallow in the Irish House of Commons from 1751 until his death. By his wife Lucia, daughter of John Martin, he had a son Henry, who died in 1757. His estate then passed to his younger brother Robert Boyle-Walsingham. His widow Lucia married The Viscount Clifden and died on 26 July 1802.
