= William Aston (MP) =

English politician

William Aston (fl. 1407) was an English politician. He sat as MP for Liskeard in 1407.

On 18 December 1407, he stood surety in Chancery for a man in Middlesex.
