= Edmund Ashfield =

English painter

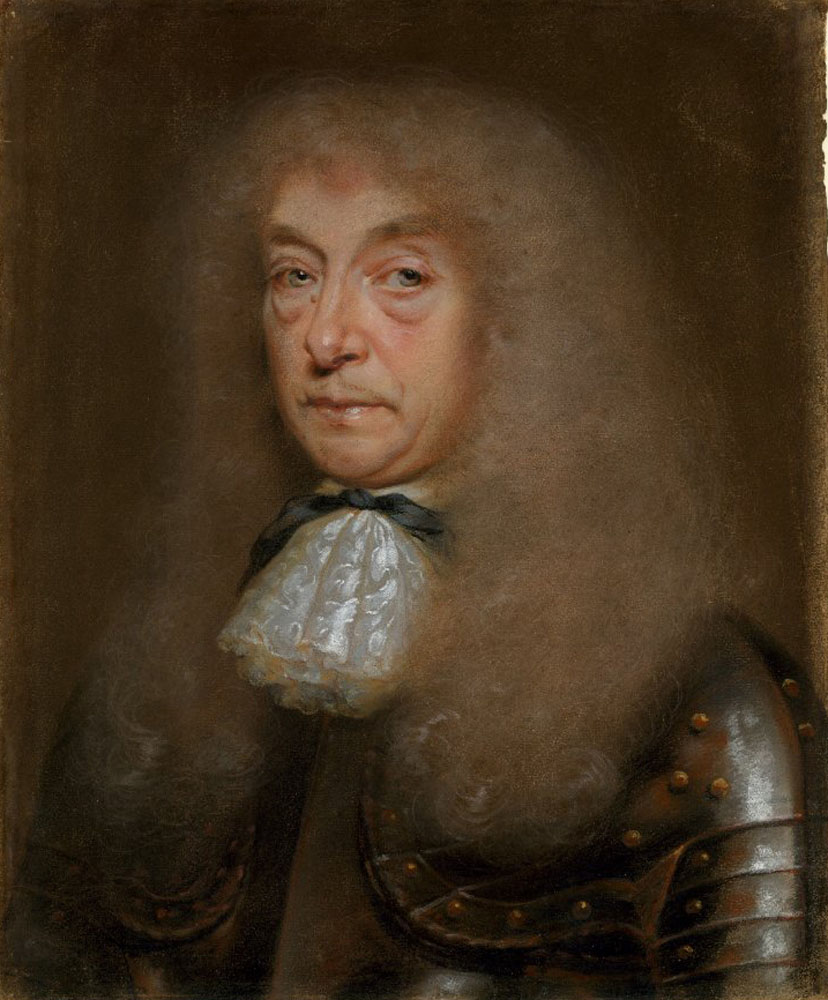
Portrait assumed to be of John Maitland, 1st Duke of Lauderdale by Ashfield

Edmund Ashfield (fl. 1660–1690) was an English portrait painter and miniaturist, who worked in both oils and pastels.

== Life ==
Ashfield came from a Buckinghamshire family and was a pupil of John Michael Wright (1617–1694). He worked both in oil and in pastel; according to Robert Edmund Graves, he excelled most in the latter. Vertue mentions a neatly painted head by him of Sir John Bennett (afterwards Lord Ossulston). A surviving portrait of Mrs Amphilis Broughton, daughter of Sir Henry Tichborne, is dated precisely 1674. He also appears to have been also a copyist, for there are portraits of Frances, Countess of Warwick, and of Mary, Lady Herbert (later Duchess of Richmond and Lennox), after Van Dyck, which Graves notes are finished with extreme delicacy.

Graves opines that his crayon drawings were highly finished, and characterised by the harmonious blending of the tints, of which he multiplied the number and variety, black and white only having hitherto chiefly been employed, the paper forming the middle tint.

Ashfield died around 1700. His pupils included Edward Lutterell (c. 1650–1710), whose works in crayons Graves says are superior to those of his teacher, and Garret Morphy (c.1655–1715).
