= Arthur Wolfe, 1st Viscount Kilwarden =

Anglo-Irish politician and judge (1739–1803)

The Right Honourable The Viscount Kilwarden KC
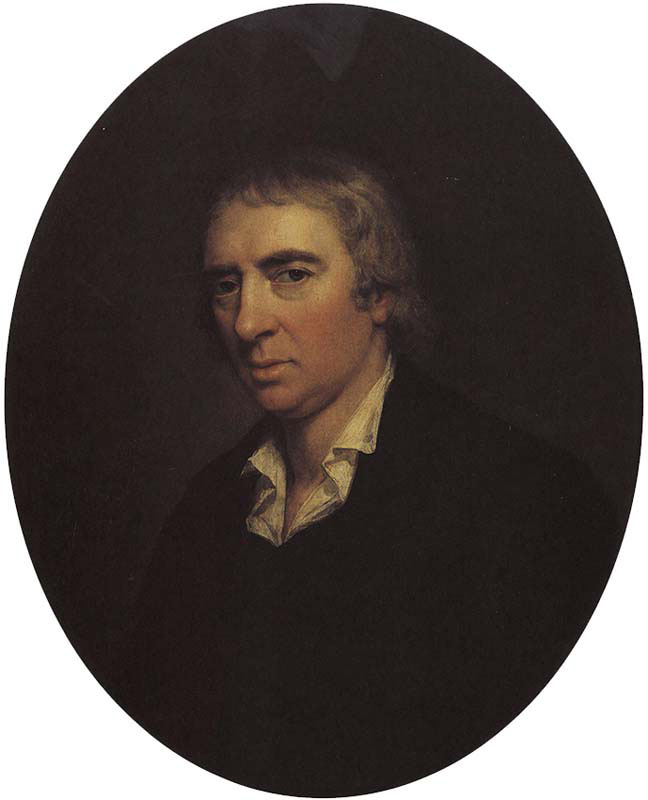
- Portrait by Hugh Douglas Hamilton, c. 1797–1800

Lord Chief Justice of Ireland
- In office 3 July 1798 – 23 July 1803
- Preceded by: Lord Clonmell
- Succeeded by: William Downes

Member of Parliament for Dublin City
- In office January 1798 – July 1798 Serving with John Claudius Beresford
- Preceded by: Lord Henry FitzGerald
- Succeeded by: George Ogle

Personal details
- Born: 19 January 1739 Forenaughts House, Naas, County Kildare, Kingdom of Ireland
- Died: 23 July 1803 (aged 64) Dublin, United Kingdom of Great Britain & Ireland
- Spouse: Anne Ruxton
- Education: Trinity College Dublin

Arthur Wolfe, 1st Viscount Kilwarden KC (19 January 1739 – 23 July 1803) was an Anglo-Irish politician and judge who served as the Lord Chief Justice of Ireland from 1793 until 1803, when he was murdered during the Irish rebellion of 1803.

== Early life ==
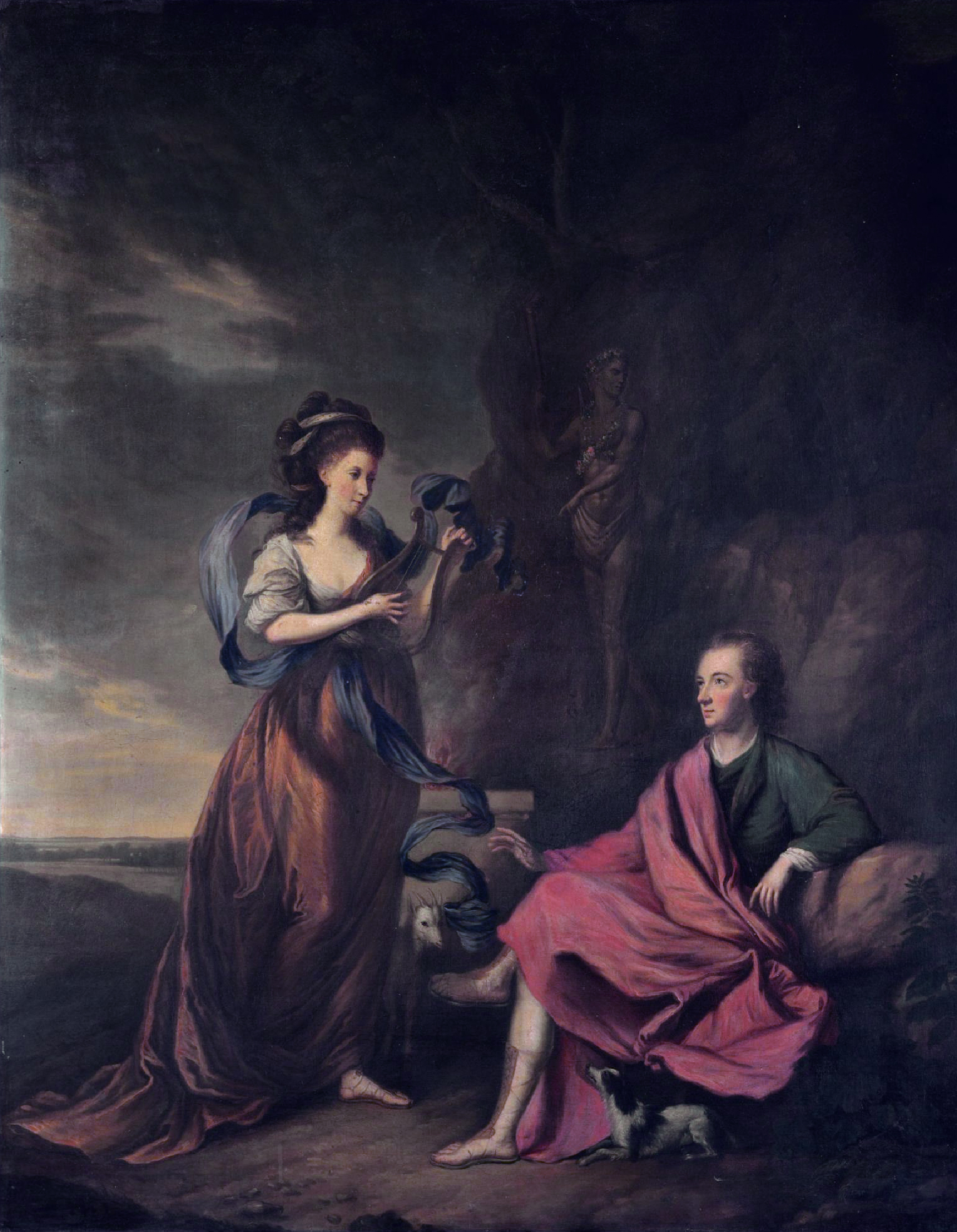
1769 portrait of Kilwarden and his wife Anne by Thomas Hickey

Arthur Wolfe was born at Forenaughts House, near Naas, being the eighth of nine sons born to John Wolfe (1700–1760) and his wife Mary (d. 1763), the only child and heiress of William Philpot, a successful merchant at Dublin. One of his brothers, Peter, was the High Sheriff of Kildare, and his first cousin Theobald was the father of the poet Charles Wolfe.

== Career ==
Wolfe was educated at Trinity College Dublin - where he was elected a Scholar - and at the Middle Temple in London. He was called to the Irish Bar in 1766. In 1769, he married Anne Ruxton (1745–1804), and after building up a successful practice took silk in 1778. He and Anne had four children, John, Arthur, Mariana and Elizabeth.

In 1783, Wolfe was returned as Member of Parliament for Coleraine, which he represented until 1790. In 1787, he was appointed Solicitor-General for Ireland, and was returned to Parliament for Jamestown in 1790.

Appointed Attorney-General for Ireland in 1789, he was known for his strict adherence to the forms of law, and his opposition to the arbitrary measures taken by the authorities, despite his own position in the Protestant Ascendancy. He unsuccessfully prosecuted William Drennan in 1792. In 1795, Lord Fitzwilliam, the new Lord Lieutenant, intended to remove him from his place as Attorney-General to make way for George Ponsonby. In compensation, Wolfe's wife was created Baroness Kilwarden on 30 September 1795; however, the recall of Fitzwilliam enabled Wolfe to retain his office.

In January 1798, he was simultaneously returned to Parliament for Dublin City and Ardfert. However, he left the House of Commons when he was appointed Chief Justice of the Kings Bench for Ireland and created Baron Kilwarden on 3 July 1798.

=== Wolfe Tone ===
After the Irish Rebellion of 1798, Kilwarden became notable for twice issuing writs of habeas corpus on behalf of Wolfe Tone, then held in military custody, but these were ignored by the army and forestalled by Tone's suicide in prison. In 1795 he had also warned Tone and some of his associates to leave Ireland to avoid prosecution. Tone's godfather, Theobald Wolfe of Blackhall (the father of Charles Wolfe) was Kilwarden's first cousin, and Tone may have been Theobald's natural son. These attempts to help a political opponent were unique at the time.

After the passage of the Act of Union, which he supported, Kilwarden was created Viscount Kilwarden on 29 December 1800. In 1802, he was appointed Vice-Chancellor of the University of Dublin.

Despite his actions on behalf of Wolfe Tone, Kilwarden was hated by the United Irishmen for his prosecution of William Orr in 1797, and he had entertained considerable fear for his safety after their failed rebellion. His murder in 1803 is often said to have been a delayed revenge for the death of Orr. Another theory is that it was a case of mistaken identity, the real target being his colleague Hugh Carleton, 1st Viscount Carleton (although several witnesses said that Kilwarden identified himself to his killers, who replied "You're the one we want").

In 1802 he presided over the case against Major Sirr in which the habitual abuses of power used to suppress rebellion were exposed in court.

=== Father Gahan ===
In the same year he ordered that the well-known Catholic priest Father William Gahan be imprisoned for contempt of court. In a case over the disputed will of Gahan's friend John Butler, 12th Baron Dunboyne, the priest refused to answer certain questions on the ground that to do so would violate the seal of the confessional, despite a ruling(which was overturned in the twentieth century) that the common law did not recognize the seal of the confessional as a ground for refusing to give evidence. The judge may well have felt some sympathy for Gahan's predicament, as he was released from prison after only a few days.

== Death ==
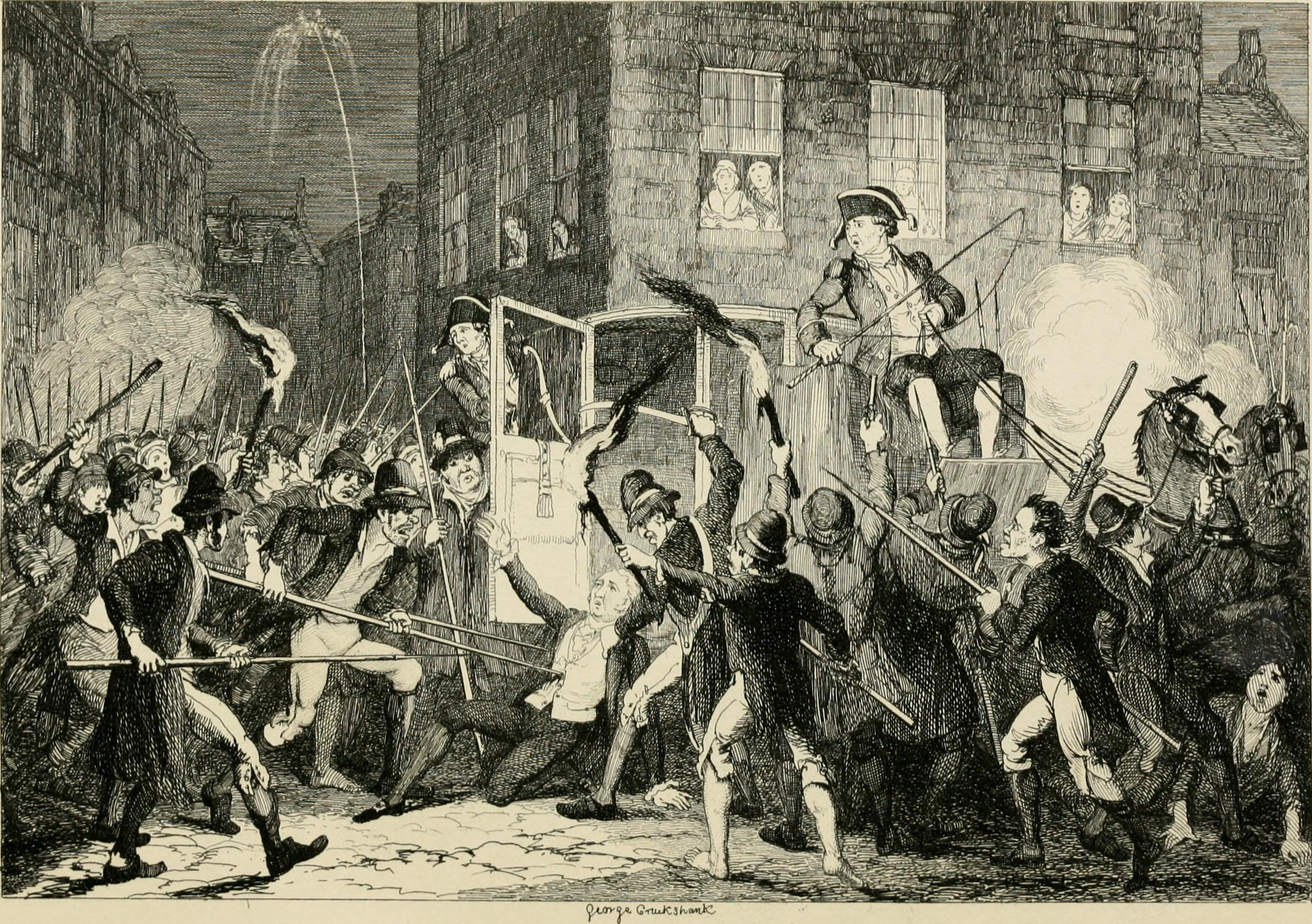
1854 depiction of the murder of Kilwarden during the 1803 rebellion.

During the 1803 rebellion, Kilwarden, who had never been forgiven by the United Irishmen for the execution of William Orr, was clearly in great danger. On the night of 23 July 1803, the approach of the Kildare rebels induced him to leave his residence, Newlands House, in the suburbs of Dublin, with his daughter Elizabeth and his nephew, Rev. Richard Wolfe.

Thinking that he would be safer among the crowd, he ordered his driver to proceed by way of Thomas Street in the city centre; however, the street was occupied by Robert Emmet's rebels. Unwisely, when challenged, he gave his name and office, and he was rapidly dragged from his carriage and stabbed repeatedly with pikes.

His nephew was murdered in a similar fashion, while Elizabeth was allowed to escape to Dublin Castle, where she raised the alarm. When the rebels were suppressed, Kilwarden was found to be still living, and was carried to a watch-house, where he died shortly thereafter. His last words, spoken in reply to a soldier who called for the death of his murderers, were "Murder must be punished; but let no man suffer for my death, but on a fair trial, and by the laws of his country."

He was succeeded by his eldest son John Wolfe, 2nd Viscount Kilwarden. Neither John nor his younger brother Arthur, who died in 1805, had male issue, and on John's death in 1830 the title became extinct.

Parliament of Ireland
Preceded by Richard Jackson; John Beresford	Member of Parliament for Coleraine; 1783–1790; With: Richard Jackson	Succeeded by George Jackson; John Beresford
Preceded by Sir Francis Hutchinson; Henry Bruen	Member of Parliament for Jamestown; 1790–1798; With: Henry Wood 1790–1796; Hon. Robert King 1796–1798	Succeeded by Gilbert King; John King
Preceded by Robert Day; Richard Archdall	Member of Parliament for Ardfert; 1798; With: Robert Day	Succeeded by Robert Day; Lord Charles FitzGerald
Preceded by Lord Henry FitzGerald; Henry Grattan	Member of Parliament for Dublin City; 1798; With: John Claudius Beresford	Succeeded by John Claudius Beresford; George Ogle
Legal offices
Preceded by Hugh Carleton	Solicitor-General for Ireland; 1787–1789	Succeeded by John Toler
Preceded by John Fitzgibbon	Attorney-General for Ireland; 1789–1798	Succeeded by John Toler
Preceded by The Earl of Clonmell	Lord Chief Justice of the King's Bench in Ireland; 1798–1803	Succeeded by The Lord Downes
Peerage of Ireland
New creation	Viscount Kilwarden; 1800–1803	Succeeded by John Wolfe
New creation	Baron Kilwarden; 1798–1803	Succeeded by John Wolfe
