= John Ruxton =

Irish landowner and politician

John William Ruxton (1721 – 7 March 1785) was an Irish landowner and Member of Parliament.

The son of William Ruxton of Ardee in County Louth, John married Laetitia Fitzherbert, eventual heiress of Shercock in County Cavan and Blackcastle in County Meath. He was elected to succeed his father as MP for Ardee in 1751, and sat until 1776. He was then re-elected in October 1783 (along with his younger brother, Charles Ruxton) and sat until his death.

He built Ardee House in 1780. Ardee and Shercock were inherited by the eldest son, William, while Blackcastle was divided between the younger sons John, (who married Margaret Edgeworth, aunt of the novelist Maria Edgeworth) and Samuel. the two parts were later reunited.
