= William Aston (Irish judge) =

Sir William Aston (1613-1671) was an English-born barrister, politician and soldier, who fought with distinction in Ireland for King Charles I during the English Civil War. Although he made his peace with the Cromwellian regime after the King's defeat, he is believed to have remained a convinced Royalist at heart. He was rewarded for his loyalty to the Crown with a seat on the Irish High Court Bench after the Restoration. His eldest son was hanged for murder in 1686. His last direct male descendant, also named William Aston, was the de jure 6th Lord Aston of Forfar.

== Background ==
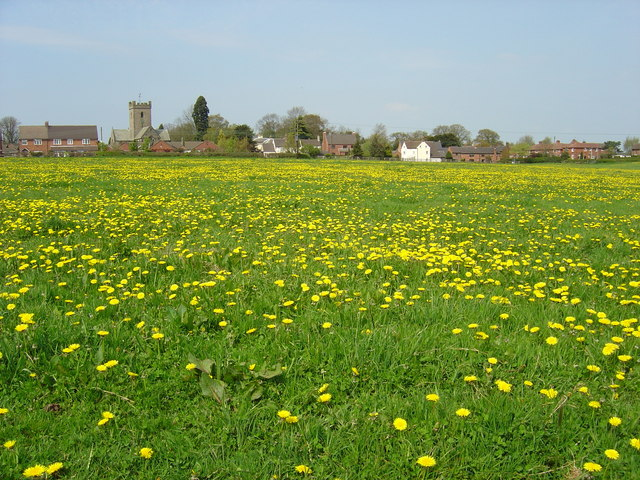
Church Leigh, Staffordshire, birthplace of Sir William Aston

He was born at Leigh, Staffordshire, son of John Aston and his wife, Margery Walton, daughter of James Walton of Fole. His father was the grandson of Sir Walter Aston of Tixall, who was also the grandfather of the 1st Lord Aston of Forfar. He entered Gray's Inn in 1639, and then moved to Ireland. In 1646, he was serving as a major in the Royalist army under Col. Sir Anthony Hungerford, and was then described as an "honest royalist"; yet a few years later he was serving in the Cromwellian army, and sat as an Irish MP for County Meath and County Louth in the Second Protectorate Parliament of 1656 and that of 1659.

Elrington Ball, in his comprehensive study of the pre-1921 Irish judiciary, argues that despite his apparent change of side, his loyalty to the Crown was never really in doubt: certainly, early in 1660, he was known to be actively supporting the Restoration of Charles II. The new regime praised him for his "early and faithful adherence to the King". He was knighted and made a justice of the Court of King's Bench (Ireland). He was appointed Recorder of Drogheda in 1655.

== Judge ==
As a judge he presided over one of the last Irish witch trials, that of Florence Newton of Youghal at the Cork assizes: the fate of the accused is not known for certain, though it is generally thought that she was hanged. Aston's transcript survives, and is a valuable source of information on the trial.

He engaged in a dispute over precedence with his colleague Sir Jerome Alexander, who as a result is said to have challenged him to a duel, and then accused him of cowardice for refusing to accept the challenge. The two were neighbours in Ship Street, Dublin; Aston obtained permission from the Corporation to widen the street in front of his house. He also quarrelled with the well-known Roman Catholic barrister Patrick D'Arcy, who had carried Alexander's challenge: according to one report, Aston tried unsuccessfully to have D'Arcy prosecuted. D'Arcy in turn threatened to horsewhip Aston, who is said to have gone in fear of him for some time afterwards, although the story that he fled to England and stayed there until after D'Arcy's death is not borne out by the evidence.

As well as his townhouse, he also had a country estate with a 15th Century castle at Richardstown in County Louth, which he obtained from the historic White family. His exact date of death is disputed but it was probably in January 1671. He was Treasurer of the King's Inns from 1665 to 1669.

== Family ==
He married firstly Sarah Wingfield daughter of Thomas Wingfield of Shrewsbury, by whom had two daughters, Elizabeth and Anne; she died before 1642. He married secondly in 1642 Elizabeth Gill (née Fellgate), the daughter and widow of merchants of London, by whom he had two sons, William junior and John, who died before his father; Elizabeth died in 1661. William junior, who was hanged in 1686, married Lettice Jones and had four children.

=== The case of Aston's son William, who was hanged for murder in 1686 ===
Aston's eldest son by Elizabeth Gill, William Aston junior (1643-1686), who was a barrister of Lincoln's Inn, killed a Mr Keating in a street brawl in Dublin in 1686 and was tried, convicted and hanged for his murder. The crime was considered so grave, and his defence of his actions so feeble, amounting to an unsupported claim that Keating had insulted Aston's wife, that the Crown, despite his high social standing, clearly decided to make an example of him.A good deal of trouble was taken to empanel a "good jury" i.e. one which could be trusted, with a certain amount of "persuasion" (a polite word used by judges for bullying) from the Bench, to bring in a guilty verdict. The Lord Lieutenant of Ireland, Henry Hyde, 2nd Earl of Clarendon, referred to Aston with contempt, and wrote to his brother Lord Rochester that despite "great intercession" having been made on the young man's behalf, he could see no grounds for James II to exercise his prerogative of mercy. The fact that the victim was a Roman Catholic no doubt aggravated the crime in the eyes of a devoutly Catholic King, although those who interceded for him, who were probably all Protestants, insisted that an English jury would have acquitted him. Clarendon however maintained that the trial had been scrupulously fair.

The only concession made to clemency was that, rather than Aston being hanged, drawn, and quartered and his body parts exposed in public, which was the usual penalty for an Irish murderer at the time, his body, after a simple hanging would be released to his family for private burial. Sentence was carried out on 7 May 1686. Although his property was forfeit to the Crown, the King, on the petition of the judges who had presided at the trial, agreed to restore it to his widow, who was living in poverty with her four children.

=== Third marriage ===
Sir William married thirdly, after 1661, Ursula Stockton, daughter of his judicial colleague, Thomas Stockton, and his wife Ursula Bellot, sister of Sir John Bellot, of Great Moreton Hall, Cheshire, and had one surviving son, Thomas. Thomas's son William married Salisbury Tichborne, daughter and heiress of Henry Tichborne, 1st Baron Ferrard and Arabella Cotton in 1713 and lived at Richardstown. Their grandson William Aston (died 1769) was the de jure 6th Lord Aston of Forfar, although he never made out a claim to the title, and may not have been aware of his right to it.

After Sir William's death, Ursula remarried Colonel Sir Charles Feilding, a younger son of George Feilding, 1st Earl of Desmond and Bridget Stanhope, by whom she had two daughters. She died in 1720. Lord Clarendon, in the letter to his brother Lord Rochester describing her stepson's conviction for murder, also gossiped that Ursula had a jointure of £300 a year, making her a woman of considerable wealth.
