= List of townlands of the barony of West Carbery (East Division) =

This is a sortable table of the townlands in the barony of West Carbery (E.D.), County Cork, Ireland. Duplicate names occur where there is more than one townland with the same name in the barony, and also where a townland is known by two alternative names. Names marked in bold typeface are towns and villages, and the word Town appears for those entries in the area column.

== Townland list ==
Townland	Area (acres)	Barony	Civil parish	Poor law union
**Abbey Strand**	Town	West Carbery (E.D.)	Tullagh	Skibbereen
Abbeystrowry	428	West Carbery (E.D.)	Abbeystrowry	Skibbereen
Acres	403	West Carbery (E.D.)	Dromdaleague	Skibbereen
Acres	99	West Carbery (E.D.)	Kilmacabea	Skibbereen
Adrigool	450	West Carbery (E.D.)	Castlehaven	Skibbereen
Aghadown	211	West Carbery (E.D.)	Aghadown	Skibbereen
Aghillaun	3	West Carbery (E.D.)	Creagh	Skibbereen
Aghills	732	West Carbery (E.D.)	Castlehaven	Skibbereen
Angram	143	West Carbery (E.D.)	Dromdaleague	Skibbereen
Ardagh	211	West Carbery (E.D.)	Aghadown	Skibbereen
Ardagh	271	West Carbery (E.D.)	Myross	Skibbereen
Ardagh North	158	West Carbery (E.D.)	Tullagh	Skibbereen
Ardagh South	68	West Carbery (E.D.)	Tullagh	Skibbereen
Ardagilla	73	West Carbery (E.D.)	Creagh	Skibbereen
Ardgehane	177	West Carbery (E.D.)	Castlehaven	Skibbereen
Ardgort	88	West Carbery (E.D.)	Clear-island	Skibbereen
Ardnagrena	158	West Carbery (E.D.)	Creagh	Skibbereen
Ardnagroghery	90	West Carbery (E.D.)	Aghadown	Skibbereen
Ardra	83	West Carbery (E.D.)	Myross	Skibbereen
Ardraly	475	West Carbery (E.D.)	Aghadown	Skibbereen
Ballinard	230	West Carbery (E.D.)	Tullagh	Skibbereen
Ballinatona	140	West Carbery (E.D.)	Myross	Skibbereen
Ballincolla	352	West Carbery (E.D.)	Myross	Skibbereen
Ballinlough	200	West Carbery (E.D.)	Kilmacabea	Skibbereen
Ballyally	193	West Carbery (E.D.)	Creagh	Skibbereen
Ballycahane	122	West Carbery (E.D.)	Castlehaven	Skibbereen
Ballyieragh North	240	West Carbery (E.D.)	Clear-island	Skibbereen
Ballyieragh South	202	West Carbery (E.D.)	Clear-island	Skibbereen
Ballyisland	101	West Carbery (E.D.)	Creagh	Skibbereen
Ballylinchy	796	West Carbery (E.D.)	Tullagh	Skibbereen
Ballymacrown	663	West Carbery (E.D.)	Tullagh	Skibbereen
Ballyoughtera	156	West Carbery (E.D.)	Creagh	Skibbereen
Ballyriree	434	West Carbery (E.D.)	Kilmacabea	Skibbereen
**Baltimore**	Town	West Carbery (E.D.)	Tullagh	Skibbereen
Baltimore	615	West Carbery (E.D.)	Tullagh	Skibbereen
Barnabah	47	West Carbery (E.D.)	Tullagh	Skibbereen
Barnagowlane	151	West Carbery (E.D.)	Abbeystrowry	Skibbereen
Barnagowlane East	963	West Carbery (E.D.)	Dromdaleague	Skibbereen
Barnagowlane West	817	West Carbery (E.D.)	Dromdaleague	Skibbereen
Barryroe	235	West Carbery (E.D.)	Castlehaven	Skibbereen
Baurgarriff	167	West Carbery (E.D.)	Dromdaleague	Skibbereen
Baurnahulla	746	West Carbery (E.D.)	Dromdaleague	Skibbereen
Bawnfune	148	West Carbery (E.D.)	Kilmacabea	Skibbereen
Bawngare	141	West Carbery (E.D.)	Aghadown	Skibbereen
Bawnishall	385	West Carbery (E.D.)	Castlehaven	Skibbereen
Bawnlahan	183	West Carbery (E.D.)	Castlehaven	Skibbereen
Bawnlahan	411	West Carbery (E.D.)	Myross	Skibbereen
Bawnnagollopy	134	West Carbery (E.D.)	Abbeystrowry	Skibbereen
Bawnnagollopy	53	West Carbery (E.D.)	Castlehaven	Skibbereen
Bawnnahow North	229	West Carbery (E.D.)	Dromdaleague	Skibbereen
Bawnnahow South	207	West Carbery (E.D.)	Dromdaleague	Skibbereen
Bigmarsh	174	West Carbery (E.D.)	Aghadown	Skibbereen
Bluid East	104	West Carbery (E.D.)	Castlehaven	Skibbereen
Bluid West	183	West Carbery (E.D.)	Castlehaven	Skibbereen
Bohernabredagh	113	West Carbery (E.D.)	Dromdaleague	Skibbereen
Boolybane	97	West Carbery (E.D.)	Creagh	Skibbereen
Brade	591	West Carbery (E.D.)	Myross	Skibbereen
Bullock Island	14	West Carbery (E.D.)	Creagh	Skibbereen
Bunlick	123	West Carbery (E.D.)	Creagh	Skibbereen
Cahergal	268	West Carbery (E.D.)	Myross	Skibbereen
Calf Island East	77	West Carbery (E.D.)	Aghadown	Skibbereen
Calf Island Middle	63	West Carbery (E.D.)	Skull	Skull
Cappanabohy	231	West Carbery (E.D.)	Kilmacabea	Skibbereen
Carhoona	42	West Carbery (E.D.)	Clear-island	Skibbereen
Carrigbaun	298	West Carbery (E.D.)	Drinagh	Skibbereen
Carrigeeny	311	West Carbery (E.D.)	Kilmacabea	Skibbereen
Carrigfadda	318	West Carbery (E.D.)	Abbeystrowry	Skibbereen
**Carrigillihy**	Town	West Carbery (E.D.)	Myross	Skibbereen
Carrigillihy	253	West Carbery (E.D.)	Myross	Skibbereen
Carrigtishane	217	West Carbery (E.D.)	Castlehaven	Skibbereen
Cashloura	560	West Carbery (E.D.)	Drinagh	Skibbereen
Castle Island	3	West Carbery (E.D.)	Creagh	Skibbereen
Castledonovan	123	West Carbery (E.D.)	Dromdaleague	Skibbereen
Castlehaven	202	West Carbery (E.D.)	Castlehaven	Skibbereen
**Castletownsend**	Town	West Carbery (E.D.)	Castlehaven	Skibbereen
Castletownsend	315	West Carbery (E.D.)	Castlehaven	Skibbereen
Ceancullig	687	West Carbery (E.D.)	Dromdaleague	Skibbereen
Clashduff	325	West Carbery (E.D.)	Dromdaleague	Skibbereen
Clodagh	1,046	West Carbery (E.D.)	Dromdaleague	Skibbereen
Cloddagh	232	West Carbery (E.D.)	Tullagh	Skibbereen
Cloghboola	143	West Carbery (E.D.)	Abbeystrowry	Skibbereen
Clontaff	121	West Carbery (E.D.)	Myross	Skibbereen
Cloonkeen	374	West Carbery (E.D.)	Kilmacabea	Skibbereen
Collatrum Beg	102	West Carbery (E.D.)	Aghadown	Skibbereen
Collatrum More	173	West Carbery (E.D.)	Aghadown	Skibbereen
Comillane	141	West Carbery (E.D.)	Clear-island	Skibbereen
Cooldurragha	379	West Carbery (E.D.)	Myross	Skibbereen
Coolim	2	West Carbery (E.D.)	Aghadown	Skibbereen
Coomatallin	609	West Carbery (E.D.)	Drinagh	Skibbereen
Coomavarrodig	81	West Carbery (E.D.)	Tullagh	Skibbereen
Coomnageehy	75	West Carbery (E.D.)	Abbeystrowry	Skibbereen
Coornishal	576	West Carbery (E.D.)	Kilmacabea	Skibbereen
Coronea	582	West Carbery (E.D.)	Abbeystrowry	Skibbereen
Creagh	417	West Carbery (E.D.)	Creagh	Skibbereen
Croha East	41	West Carbery (E.D.)	Clear-island	Skibbereen
Croha West	67	West Carbery (E.D.)	Clear-island	Skibbereen
Crosslea	41	West Carbery (E.D.)	Castlehaven	Skibbereen
Cullenagh	860	West Carbery (E.D.)	Castlehaven	Skibbereen
Cummeen	438	West Carbery (E.D.)	Dromdaleague	Skibbereen
Cunnamore	134	West Carbery (E.D.)	Aghadown	Skibbereen
Currabeg	245	West Carbery (E.D.)	Castlehaven	Skibbereen
Currabeg	59	West Carbery (E.D.)	Aghadown	Skibbereen
Curragh	296	West Carbery (E.D.)	Abbeystrowry	Skibbereen
Curraghalicky	317	West Carbery (E.D.)	Drinagh	Skibbereen
Curranashingane	309	West Carbery (E.D.)	Drinagh	Skibbereen
Curravally	111	West Carbery (E.D.)	Creagh	Skibbereen
Deelish	70	West Carbery (E.D.)	Abbeystrowry	Skibbereen
Deelish	788	West Carbery (E.D.)	Dromdaleague	Skibbereen
Derreenacrinnig East	504	West Carbery (E.D.)	Dromdaleague	Skibbereen
Derreenacrinnig West	530	West Carbery (E.D.)	Dromdaleague	Skibbereen
Derreenaspeeg	338	West Carbery (E.D.)	Drinagh	Skibbereen
Derreendangan	212	West Carbery (E.D.)	Abbeystrowry	Skibbereen
Derreennaclough	276	West Carbery (E.D.)	Skull	Skull
Derreennacno	201	West Carbery (E.D.)	Caheragh	Skibbereen
Derryclogh Lower	400	West Carbery (E.D.)	Drinagh	Skibbereen
Derryclogh Upper	605	West Carbery (E.D.)	Drinagh	Skibbereen
Derryduff	187	West Carbery (E.D.)	Dromdaleague	Skibbereen
Derrygereen	293	West Carbery (E.D.)	Creagh	Skibbereen
Derrygoole	114	West Carbery (E.D.)	Abbeystrowry	Skibbereen
Derrylahard	311	West Carbery (E.D.)	Skull	Skull
Derryleigh	264	West Carbery (E.D.)	Castlehaven	Skibbereen
Derrylurga	524	West Carbery (E.D.)	Abbeystrowry	Skibbereen
Derrynagree East	303	West Carbery (E.D.)	Dromdaleague	Skibbereen
Derrynagree East	355	West Carbery (E.D.)	Dromdaleague	Skibbereen
Donegall East	101	West Carbery (E.D.)	Creagh	Skibbereen
Donegall Middle	75	West Carbery (E.D.)	Creagh	Skibbereen
Donegall West	110	West Carbery (E.D.)	Creagh	Skibbereen
Dooneen	271	West Carbery (E.D.)	Castlehaven	Skibbereen
Drishanebeg	336	West Carbery (E.D.)	Abbeystrowry	Skibbereen
Drishanemore	300	West Carbery (E.D.)	Creagh	Skibbereen
Drisheen	239	West Carbery (E.D.)	Aghadown	Skibbereen
Dromadoon	137	West Carbery (E.D.)	Creagh	Skibbereen
Dromasta	449	West Carbery (E.D.)	Dromdaleague	Skibbereen
Dromduvane	192	West Carbery (E.D.)	Dromdaleague	Skibbereen
Dromnacaheragh	108	West Carbery (E.D.)	Aghadown	Skibbereen
Drummig	473	West Carbery (E.D.)	Abbeystrowry	Skibbereen
Fahouragh	114	West Carbery (E.D.)	Castlehaven	Skibbereen
Farranacoush	377	West Carbery (E.D.)	Tullagh	Skibbereen
Farranagilla	102	West Carbery (E.D.)	Castlehaven	Skibbereen
Farranagilla	61	West Carbery (E.D.)	Abbeystrowry	Skibbereen
Farranconnor	114	West Carbery (E.D.)	Castlehaven	Skibbereen
Farrandau	117	West Carbery (E.D.)	Castlehaven	Skibbereen
Farrandeligeen	101	West Carbery (E.D.)	Castlehaven	Skibbereen
Fasagh	133	West Carbery (E.D.)	Aghadown	Skibbereen
Foherlagh	214	West Carbery (E.D.)	Aghadown	Skibbereen
Forenaght	683	West Carbery (E.D.)	Castlehaven	Skibbereen
Garranes North	552	West Carbery (E.D.)	Dromdaleague	Skibbereen
Garranes South	430	West Carbery (E.D.)	Dromdaleague	Skibbereen
Garryglass	488	West Carbery (E.D.)	Drinagh	Skibbereen
Glanaclogha	587	West Carbery (E.D.)	Dromdaleague	Skibbereen
Glandart	385	West Carbery (E.D.)	Dromdaleague	Skibbereen
Glannafeen	259	West Carbery (E.D.)	Tullagh	Skibbereen
Glannageel	110	West Carbery (E.D.)	Castlehaven	Skibbereen
Glasheenaulin	133	West Carbery (E.D.)	Castlehaven	Skibbereen
Glebe	43	West Carbery (E.D.)	Aghadown	Skibbereen
Glebe Marsh	46	West Carbery (E.D.)	Aghadown	Skibbereen
Glen East	108	West Carbery (E.D.)	Clear-island	Skibbereen
Glen Middle	52	West Carbery (E.D.)	Clear-island	Skibbereen
Glen West	65	West Carbery (E.D.)	Clear-island	Skibbereen
Gneeves	38	West Carbery (E.D.)	Aghadown	Skibbereen
Gneeves	89	West Carbery (E.D.)	Tullagh	Skibbereen
Gokane	167	West Carbery (E.D.)	Castlehaven	Skibbereen
Goleenmarsh	69	West Carbery (E.D.)	Aghadown	Skibbereen
Gortacrossig	204	West Carbery (E.D.)	Castlehaven	Skibbereen
Gortadrohid	86	West Carbery (E.D.)	Creagh	Skibbereen
Gortaliscaw	81	West Carbery (E.D.)	Creagh	Skibbereen
Gortbrack	222	West Carbery (E.D.)	Castlehaven	Skibbereen
Gorteenalomane	190	West Carbery (E.D.)	Creagh	Skibbereen
Gortnaclohy	1,035	West Carbery (E.D.)	Creagh	Skibbereen
Gortnadihy	111	West Carbery (E.D.)	Kilmacabea	Skibbereen
Gortnalicky	149	West Carbery (E.D.)	Creagh	Skibbereen
Gortnalour	49	West Carbery (E.D.)	Clear-island	Skibbereen
Gortnamucklagh	332	West Carbery (E.D.)	Abbeystrowry	Skibbereen
Gortshaneerone	134	West Carbery (E.D.)	Creagh	Skibbereen
Gurrancs	163	West Carbery (E.D.)	Castlehaven	Skibbereen
Gurteeniher	362	West Carbery (E.D.)	Dromdaleague	Skibbereen
Gurteenroe	128	West Carbery (E.D.)	Aghadown	Skibbereen
Harboursmouth	41	West Carbery (E.D.)	Tullagh	Skibbereen
Hare Island (or Inishodriscol)	380	West Carbery (E.D.)	Aghadown	Skibbereen
High Island	3	West Carbery (E.D.)	Myross	Skibbereen
Highfield	576	West Carbery (E.D.)	Creagh	Skibbereen
Hollyhill	357	West Carbery (E.D.)	Aghadown	Skibbereen
Horse Island	26	West Carbery (E.D.)	Castlehaven	Skibbereen
Illaunbrock	3	West Carbery (E.D.)	Tullagh	Skibbereen
Illaungawna	8	West Carbery (E.D.)	Aghadown	Skibbereen
Illaunkearagh	1	West Carbery (E.D.)	Aghadown	Skibbereen
Illaunnaseer	2	West Carbery (E.D.)	Creagh	Skibbereen
Inane	188	West Carbery (E.D.)	Creagh	Skibbereen
Inane	79	West Carbery (E.D.)	Castlehaven	Skibbereen
Inchinagotagh	303	West Carbery (E.D.)	Abbeystrowry	Skibbereen
Inishbeg	370	West Carbery (E.D.)	Aghadown	Skibbereen
Inishleigh	13	West Carbery (E.D.)	Aghadown	Skibbereen
Inishodriscol (or Hare Island)	380	West Carbery (E.D.)	Aghadown	Skibbereen
Jeremiah's Island	1	West Carbery (E.D.)	Creagh	Skibbereen
Keamore	469	West Carbery (E.D.)	Kilmacabea	Skibbereen
Kedge Island	7	West Carbery (E.D.)	Tullagh	Skibbereen
Keenleen	86	West Carbery (E.D.)	Clear-island	Skibbereen
Kilfadeen	147	West Carbery (E.D.)	Kilmacabea	Skibbereen
Kilkilleen	239	West Carbery (E.D.)	Aghadown	Skibbereen
Killaderry	196	West Carbery (E.D.)	Castlehaven	Skibbereen
Killahane	50	West Carbery (E.D.)	Dromdaleague	Skibbereen
Killangal	371	West Carbery (E.D.)	Castlehaven	Skibbereen
Killaveenoge East	337	West Carbery (E.D.)	Drinagh	Skibbereen
Killaveenoge West	473	West Carbery (E.D.)	Drinagh	Skibbereen
Killeenanimrish	14	West Carbery (E.D.)	Kilmacabea	Skibbereen
Killickaforavane	39	West Carbery (E.D.)	Clear-island	Skibbereen
Kilmoon	223	West Carbery (E.D.)	Tullagh	Skibbereen
Kilmore	338	West Carbery (E.D.)	Dromdaleague	Skibbereen
Kilnaclasha	560	West Carbery (E.D.)	Abbeystrowry	Skibbereen
Kilnahera East	257	West Carbery (E.D.)	Dromdaleague	Skibbereen
Kilnahera West	115	West Carbery (E.D.)	Dromdaleague	Skibbereen
Kilsarlaght	282	West Carbery (E.D.)	Aghadown	Skibbereen
Kilscohanagh	352	West Carbery (E.D.)	Dromdaleague	Skibbereen
Knockanacohig	62	West Carbery (E.D.)	Clear-island	Skibbereen
Knockane	364	West Carbery (E.D.)	Dromdaleague	Skibbereen
Knockaneagh	132	West Carbery (E.D.)	Kilmacabea	Skibbereen
Knockannamaurnagh	38	West Carbery (E.D.)	Clear-island	Skibbereen
Knockanoulty	64	West Carbery (E.D.)	Tullagh	Skibbereen
Knockaphreaghane	96	West Carbery (E.D.)	Tullagh	Skibbereen
Knockataggart	133	West Carbery (E.D.)	Creagh	Skibbereen
Knockdrum	29	West Carbery (E.D.)	Castlehaven	Skibbereen
Knockeen	160	West Carbery (E.D.)	Aghadown	Skibbereen
Knocknamohalagh	91	West Carbery (E.D.)	Aghadown	Skibbereen
Knocknaraha	155	West Carbery (E.D.)	Aghadown	Skibbereen
Lackaghane	185	West Carbery (E.D.)	Creagh	Skibbereen
Lahanaght	971	West Carbery (E.D.)	Drinagh	Skibbereen
Lahardane Beg	71	West Carbery (E.D.)	Castlehaven	Skibbereen
Lahardane More	232	West Carbery (E.D.)	Castlehaven	Skibbereen
Laheratanvally	123	West Carbery (E.D.)	Aghadown	Skibbereen
Lahernathee	119	West Carbery (E.D.)	Creagh	Skibbereen
Lahertidaly	138	West Carbery (E.D.)	Abbeystrowry	Skibbereen
League, The	3	West Carbery (E.D.)	Myross	Skibbereen
**Leap**	Town	West Carbery (E.D.)	Kilmacabea	Skibbereen
Leighcloon	207	West Carbery (E.D.)	Aghadown	Skibbereen
Leitry Lower	357	West Carbery (E.D.)	Dromdaleague	Skibbereen
Leitry Upper	383	West Carbery (E.D.)	Dromdaleague	Skibbereen
Letterscanlan	97	West Carbery (E.D.)	Aghadown	Skibbereen
Lettertinlish	397	West Carbery (E.D.)	Castlehaven	Skibbereen
Licknavar	284	West Carbery (E.D.)	Creagh	Skibbereen
Lickowen	139	West Carbery (E.D.)	Castlehaven	Skibbereen
Lisheen Lower	61	West Carbery (E.D.)	Aghadown	Skibbereen
Lisheen Upper	187	West Carbery (E.D.)	Aghadown	Skibbereen
Lisheennapingina	92	West Carbery (E.D.)	Abbeystrowry	Skibbereen
Lisheenroe	167	West Carbery (E.D.)	Castlehaven	Skibbereen
Lissalohorig	419	West Carbery (E.D.)	Abbeystrowry	Skibbereen
Lissamona	176	West Carbery (E.D.)	Clear-island	Skibbereen
Lissane Lower	246	West Carbery (E.D.)	Caheragh	Skibbereen
Lissane Upper	281	West Carbery (E.D.)	Caheragh	Skibbereen
Lissanoohig	314	West Carbery (E.D.)	Abbeystrowry	Skibbereen
Lissarankin	144	West Carbery (E.D.)	Castlehaven	Skibbereen
Lissaree	137	West Carbery (E.D.)	Aghadown	Skibbereen
Listarkin	163	West Carbery (E.D.)	Myross	Skibbereen
Loughcrot	213	West Carbery (E.D.)	Dromdaleague	Skibbereen
Loughmarsh	112	West Carbery (E.D.)	Aghadown	Skibbereen
Low Island	1	West Carbery (E.D.)	Myross	Skibbereen
Lurriga	165	West Carbery (E.D.)	Abbeystrowry	Skibbereen
Lyre	212	West Carbery (E.D.)	Aghadown	Skibbereen
Mallavonea	140	West Carbery (E.D.)	Aghadown	Skibbereen
Mallavonea	26	West Carbery (E.D.)	Abbeystrowry	Skibbereen
Marsh	154	West Carbery (E.D.)	Abbeystrowry	Skibbereen
Maulagow	269	West Carbery (E.D.)	Drinagh	Skibbereen
Maulatrahane	345	West Carbery (E.D.)	Kilmacabea	Skibbereen
Maulbrack	450	West Carbery (E.D.)	Abbeystrowry	Skibbereen
Maulicarrane	114	West Carbery (E.D.)	Myross	Skibbereen
Maulnagirra	211	West Carbery (E.D.)	Kilmacabea	Skibbereen
Maulnaskeha	275	West Carbery (E.D.)	Dromdaleague	Skibbereen
Mealisheen	58	West Carbery (E.D.)	Kilmacabea	Skibbereen
Milleenahorna	195	West Carbery (E.D.)	Abbeystrowry	Skibbereen
Milleenawillin	219	West Carbery (E.D.)	Abbeystrowry	Skibbereen
Minanes	569	West Carbery (E.D.)	Drinagh	Skibbereen
Mohanagh	675	West Carbery (E.D.)	Aghadown	Skibbereen
Moneyvollahane	342	West Carbery (E.D.)	Castlehaven	Skibbereen
Moyny East	318	West Carbery (E.D.)	Dromdaleague	Skibbereen
Moyny Lower	216	West Carbery (E.D.)	Dromdaleague	Skibbereen
Moyny Middle	107	West Carbery (E.D.)	Dromdaleague	Skibbereen
Moyny Upper	225	West Carbery (E.D.)	Dromdaleague	Skibbereen
Mullaghmesha	423	West Carbery (E.D.)	Dromdaleague	Skibbereen
Munnane	210	West Carbery (E.D.)	Aghadown	Skibbereen
Munnig North	354	West Carbery (E.D.)	Creagh	Skibbereen
Munnig South	77	West Carbery (E.D.)	Creagh	Skibbereen
Myross	226	West Carbery (E.D.)	Myross	Skibbereen
Oldcourt	218	West Carbery (E.D.)	Creagh	Skibbereen
Paddock	194	West Carbery (E.D.)	Aghadown	Skibbereen
Pookeen	159	West Carbery (E.D.)	Tullagh	Skibbereen
Poulnacallee	153	West Carbery (E.D.)	Aghadown	Skibbereen
Poundlick	362	West Carbery (E.D.)	Creagh	Skibbereen
Prohoness	288	West Carbery (E.D.)	Aghadown	Skibbereen
Quarantine Island	1	West Carbery (E.D.)	Tullagh	Skibbereen
Rabbit Island	17	West Carbery (E.D.)	Myross	Skibbereen
Raheen	159	West Carbery (E.D.)	Myross	Skibbereen
Raheen	256	West Carbery (E.D.)	Castlehaven	Skibbereen
Rahine	158	West Carbery (E.D.)	Aghadown	Skibbereen
Rathmore	709	West Carbery (E.D.)	Tullagh	Skibbereen
Rea	266	West Carbery (E.D.)	Abbeystrowry	Skibbereen
Rearahinagh	290	West Carbery (E.D.)	Dromdaleague	Skibbereen
Rearahinagh	357	West Carbery (E.D.)	Caheragh	Skibbereen
Reen	252	West Carbery (E.D.)	Myross	Skibbereen
Reencorreen	347	West Carbery (E.D.)	Abbeystrowry	Skibbereen
Reendacussane	94	West Carbery (E.D.)	Castlehaven	Skibbereen
Reenmore Island	41	West Carbery (E.D.)	Creagh	Skibbereen
Reenmurragha	500	West Carbery (E.D.)	Aghadown	Skibbereen
Reenroe	238	West Carbery (E.D.)	Dromdaleague	Skibbereen
Rossnagoose	86	West Carbery (E.D.)	Aghadown	Skibbereen
Russagh	431	West Carbery (E.D.)	Abbeystrowry	Skibbereen
Sandy Island	10	West Carbery (E.D.)	Tullagh	Skibbereen
Scobaun	180	West Carbery (E.D.)	Castlehaven	Skibbereen
Seehanes	307	West Carbery (E.D.)	Dromdaleague	Skibbereen
Shreelane	403	West Carbery (E.D.)	Kilmacabea	Skibbereen
Shronacarton	216	West Carbery (E.D.)	Dromdaleague	Skibbereen
Skahanagh	173	West Carbery (E.D.)	Myross	Skibbereen
Skeagh	552	West Carbery (E.D.)	Abbeystrowry	Skibbereen
Skeam East	49	West Carbery (E.D.)	Aghadown	Skibbereen
Skeam West	30	West Carbery (E.D.)	Aghadown	Skibbereen
**Skibbereen**	Town	West Carbery (E.D.)	Abbeystrowry	Skibbereen
**Skibbereen**	Town	West Carbery (E.D.)	Creagh	Skibbereen
Skiddy Island	1	West Carbery (E.D.)	Myross	Skibbereen
Slievemore	283	West Carbery (E.D.)	Tullagh	Skibbereen
Smorane	214	West Carbery (E.D.)	Creagh	Skibbereen
Smorane	223	West Carbery (E.D.)	Castlehaven	Skibbereen
Spanish Island	119	West Carbery (E.D.)	Creagh	Skibbereen
The Catalogues	4	West Carbery (E.D.)	Tullagh	Skibbereen
The League	3	West Carbery (E.D.)	Myross	Skibbereen
The Pike	363	West Carbery (E.D.)	Drinagh	Skibbereen
Toehead	219	West Carbery (E.D.)	Castlehaven	Skibbereen
Tonafora	83	West Carbery (E.D.)	Dromdaleague	Skibbereen
Toneagh	247	West Carbery (E.D.)	Dromdaleague	Skibbereen
Tooreen	521	West Carbery (E.D.)	Caheragh	Skibbereen
Tooreennasillane	166	West Carbery (E.D.)	Abbeystrowry	Skibbereen
Toormore	142	West Carbery (E.D.)	Aghadown	Skibbereen
Toughmacdermody	255	West Carbery (E.D.)	Drinagh	Skibbereen
Toughraheen	277	West Carbery (E.D.)	Dromdaleague	Skibbereen
Turkhead	88	West Carbery (E.D.)	Aghadown	Skibbereen
**Unionhall**	Town	West Carbery (E.D.)	Myross	Skibbereen
Whitehall	142	West Carbery (E.D.)	Aghadown	Skibbereen
