= William Parkinson Ruxton =

William Parkinson Ruxton (1766 – 11 October 1847) of Red House in County Louth was an Irish Member of Parliament.

Ruxton was the son of Charles Ruxton by his wife Elizabeth, daughter of Robert Parkinson of Red House. He inherited the Red House and rebuilt it in its present form. He was elected to the Irish House of Commons for Ardee in 1790 and then again in 1799, sitting until the Parliament of Ireland was abolished by the Act of Union 1800. He was appointed High Sheriff of Louth for 1819–20.

== Personal life ==
On 18 January 1802 he married Anna Maria Fortescue (born 6 July 1773 – died 25 August 1865), daughter of Thomas Fortescue of Dromisken. They had no children and she inherited Red House at his death. She died in 1865 and the estate passed to her nephew, Chichester Fortescue, who adopted the surname Parkinson-Fortescue.

== Arms ==
Coat of arms of William Parkinson Ruxton
Notes Confirmed 1 May 1807 by Sir Chicester Fortescue, Ulster King of Arms. Crest A bull's head erased Sable armed Or. Escutcheon Quarterly 1st & 4th Argent three bulls' heads erased Sablr armed Or (Ruxton) 2nd & 3rd Gules on a chevron between three ostrichs' feathers Argent as many pellets (Parkinson). Motto Jam Jam

== Links ==
- Profile^{[usurped]}, leighrayment.com; accessed 3 June 2016.
