= Thomas Tichborne =

English Roman Catholic priest and martyr

Venerable Thomas Tichborne
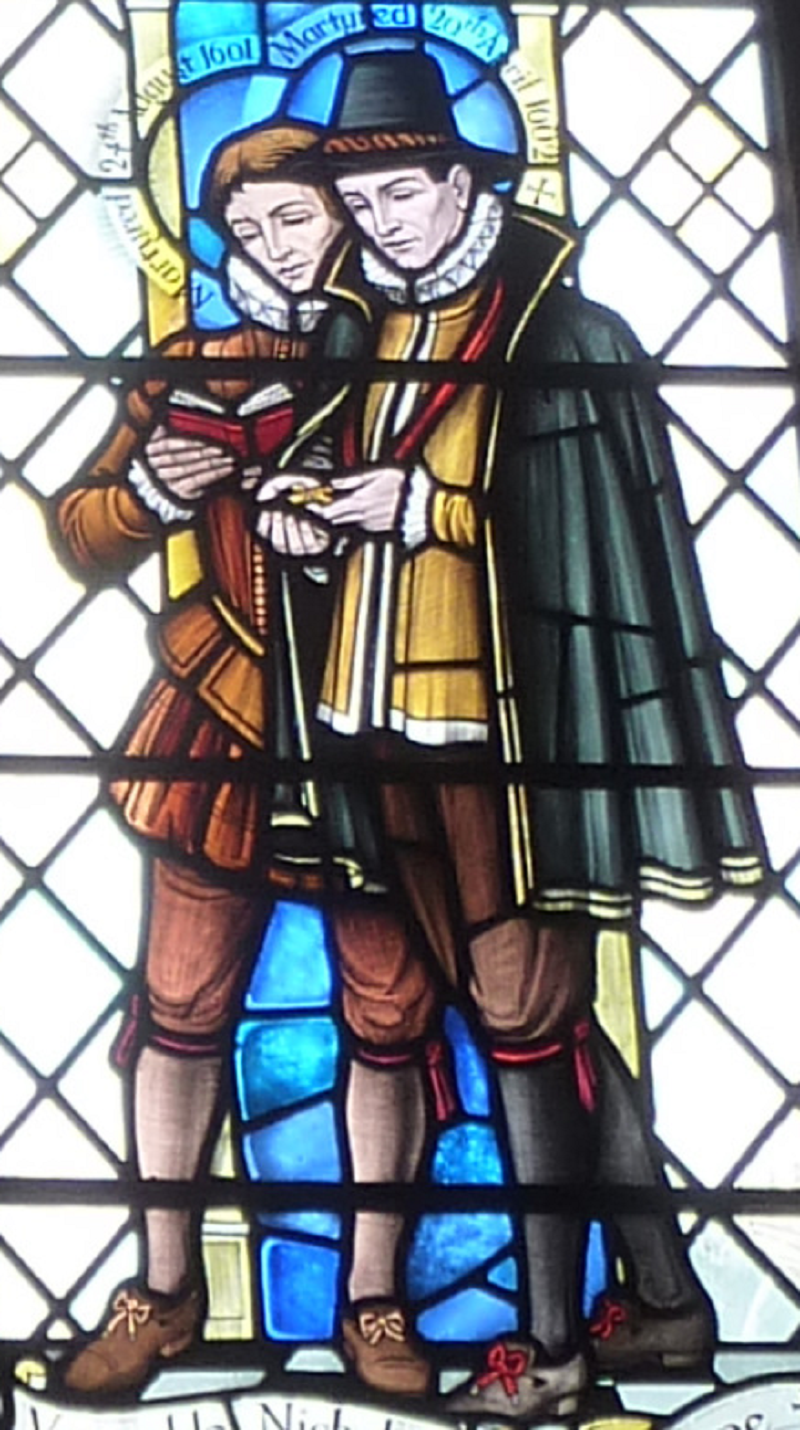
- Detail from a stained glass window in St Peter's Catholic Church, Winchester. Thomas is on the right.

Martyr
- Born: c. 1567; Hartley Mauditt, Hampshire, England
- Died: 20 April 1602 (aged 34 - 35); Tyburn, London, England

Thomas Tichborne (1567 – 20 April 1602) was an English Roman Catholic priest. He is regarded as a Catholic martyr.

== Life ==
Born at Hartley Mauditt, Hampshire, in 1567, Thomas was a younger son of Nicholas Tichborne and Mary Myll. Nicholas died in Winchester Gaol about 1588/9 and was brother to Peter Tichborne, father of Chidiock Tichborne. Nicolas and Peter were grandsons of John Tichborne of Tichborne and Margaret Martin from whom the Tichborne baronets are also descended.

He was educated at Reims (1584–87) and Rome, where he was ordained on Ascension Day, 17 May 1592. Returning to England on 10 March 1594, he worked in Hampshire. There he escaped apprehension by the authorities until the early part of 1597.

He was sent a prisoner to the Gatehouse in London, but in the autumn of 1598 was helped to escape by his brother, Nicholas Tichborne, and Thomas Hackshott, who were both executed shortly afterwards. Betrayed by Atkinson, an apostate priest, he was re-arrested and on 17 April 1602, was brought to trial with Robert Watkinson (a young Yorkshire man who had been educated at Rome and ordained priest at Douai a month before) and James Duckett, a London bookseller. On 20 April he was executed at Tyburn with Watkinson and Francis Page, S.J. The last named was a convert, of a Middlesex family though born in Antwerp. He had been ordained at Douai in 1600 and received into the Society of Jesus while a prisoner in Newgate. Tichborne was in the last stages of consumption when he was executed.

Thomas Tichborne was declared venerable by Pope Leo XIII in 1886
