= Tallow (Parliament of Ireland constituency) =

Pre-1801 Irish constituency

- Former borough constituency for the Irish House of Commons
- County: County Waterford
- Borough: Tallow

–1801
- Replaced by: Disfranchised

Tallow was a constituency represented in the Irish House of Commons until 1800, centred on Tallow, County Waterford.

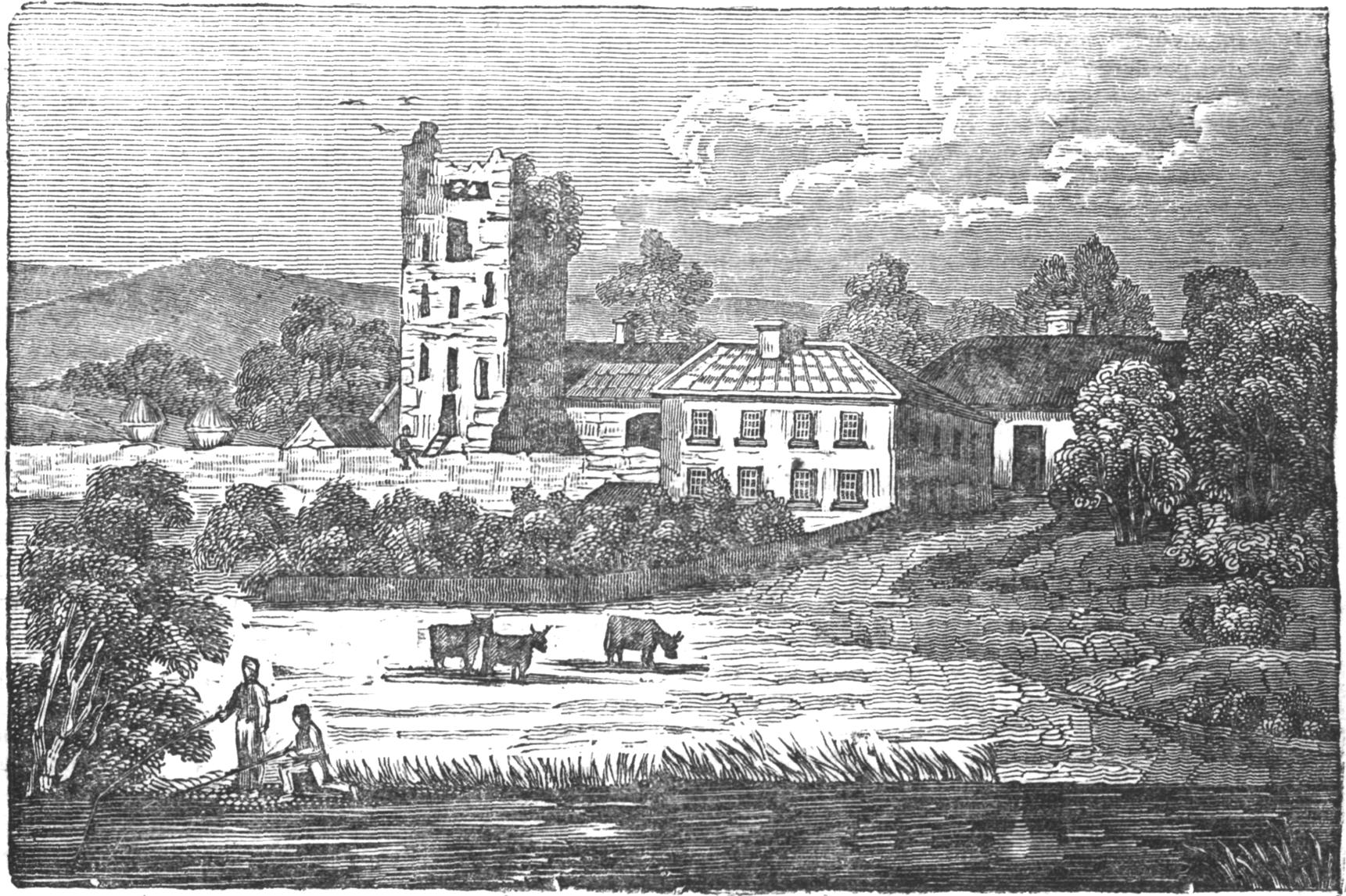
Tallow in 1834.

== Members of Parliament ==
- 1613–1615 Sir Gerard Lowther the elder and Sir Lawrence Parsons
- 1634–1635 Thomas Ellwell and Sir William Fenton
- 1639–1645 John Fitzwilliam Barry and John Ogle
- 1661–1666 Folliott Wingfield (sat for Wicklow. Replaced May 1661 by Archibald Stewart) and Boyle Smith (died and replaced 1662 by Henry Howard)

=== 1692–1801 ===
Election	First MP	Second MP
1692	Samuel Maynard	Robert Smith
1695	Samuel Maynard	John Burt
1703	Samuel Maynard	Richard Cox
1713	William Maynard	Richard Cox
1715	William Maynard	Benjamin Parry
1727	William Maynard	Redmond Barry
1734	John Colthurst	Redmond Barry
1751	John Colthurst	Henry Boyle-Walsingham
1756	John Colthurst	Sir Henry Cavendish, 1st Bt
1757	Sir Robert Deane, 5th Bt	Sir Henry Cavendish, 1st Bt
1761	Sir Robert Deane, 5th Bt	Samuel Bagshaw
1763	Sir Robert Deane, 5th Bt	James Gisborne
1768	Nicholas Lysaght	Hugh Cane
1782	Richard O'Brien Boyle	Hugh Cane
1783	John Hobson	Hugh Cane
1790	John Egan	Hugh Cane
1793	John Egan	John Brabazon Ponsonby
1798	John Egan	John Metge
1801	Constituency disenfranchised	
