= Nicholas Tichborne =

Nicholas Tichborne (? at Hartley Mauditt, Hampshire – executed 24 August 1601 at Tyburn, London) was an English Roman Catholic layman, a recusant and Catholic martyr. He is to be distinguished from the Nicholas Tichborne who died in Winchester Gaol in 1587 who was his father.

== Life ==
He was at large in 1592, but by 14 March 1597, had been imprisoned. On that date he gave evidence against various members of his family. Before 3 November 1598, he had obtained his liberty and had effected the release of his brother, Thomas Tichborne, a prisoner in the Gatehouse, Westminster, by assaulting his keeper.

With him was executed Thomas Hackshott (b. at Mursley, Buckinghamshire), who was condemned on the same charge, viz. that of effecting the escape of the priest Thomas Tichborne.

Nicholas Tichborne and were declared venerable by Pope Leo XIII in 1886
