= William Ruxton (1697–1751) =

Irish landowner and politician

William Ruxton (1697 – 15 February 1751) was an Irish landowner and MP from Ardee in County Louth.

He sat in the Irish House of Commons as Member for Ardee from 1748 to his death; the other representative of the borough was Robert Parkinson.

In 1718 he had married Mary Gibbons of Mountainstown, co. Meath; their son John Ruxton was elected for Ardee in his father's place. Another son Charles Ruxton also later sat for the constituency and married Elizabeth Parkinson of the Red House, Ardee.

William Ruxton's youngest daughter, Anne, married Arthur Wolfe and was created Baroness Kilwarden in her own right on 30 September 1795.
