= Robert Parkinson =

Irish politician

Robert Parkinson (1694 – 14 February 1761) was an Irish Member of Parliament.

Called to the Irish Bar in 1720, he was elected to the Irish House of Commons for the borough of Ardee in November 1727, sitting until 1760.

He married Diana Peppard and their only child Elizabeth was born in 1729. She married Charles Ruxton of Ardee House, and Parkinson's estate of Red House in Ardee passed to their son William Parkinson Ruxton on his father's death in 1806. It was later inherited by the politician Chichester Fortescue, who adopted the surname Parkinson-Fortescue.
