= List of Irish MPs 1783–1790 =

This is a list of members of the Irish House of Commons between 1783 and 1790. There were 300 MPs at a time in this period.

Name	Constituency	Notes	Affiliation
Arthur Acheson	Old Leighlin		
George Agar	Callan		
Mervyn Archdall	County Fermanagh		
Henry Welbore Agar	County Kilkenny		
John Stratford	County Wicklow		
Henry Alexander	Newtownards	Elected 1788	
Richard Annesley	St Canice		
Arthur Gore	Baltimore		
Frederick Trench	Maryborough	Elected 1785	
Francis Bernard	Bandonbridge		
John Beresford	County Waterford		
Marcus Beresford	Dungarvan		
James Bernard	County Cork		
Sir John Blackwood	Killyleagh		
Robert Blackwood	Killyleagh	Died 30 June 1786	
John Blakeney	Athenry		
Theophilus Blakeney	Athenry		
John Blaquiere	Carlingford		
Thomas Cherburgh Bligh	Athboy		
Arthur Cole-Hamilton	County Fermanagh		
Thomas Orde	Rathcormack	Chief Secretary for Ireland, 1784–87	
Samuel Bradstreet	Dublin City		Independent Patriot
Sir Arthur Brooke	Maryborough	Died 7 March 1785	
Henry Vaughan Brooke	County Donegal		
Denis Browne	County Mayo		
William Brownlow	County Armagh		
Henry Bruen	Jamestown		
Robert Hobart	Portarlington	Elected 1784;Chief Secretary for Ireland, 1789–93	
Thomas Burgh	Athy		
Sir Richard Butler	County Carlow		
James Carigue-Ponsonby	Tralee		
James Alexander	Londonderry City		
Hugh Carleton	Naas		
William Handcock	Athlone		
Sir Henry Cavendish	Lismore		
Thomas Pelham	Carrick	Chief Secretary for Ireland, 1783–84	
Broderick Chinnery	Castlemartyr		
William Trench	County Galway		
John FitzGibbon	Kilmallock		
Thomas Coghlan	Carlingford		
Nicholas Colthurst	St Johnstown	Succeeded as 3rd Baronet 1787	
Thomas Conolly	County Londonderry		
William Conyngham	Killybegs		
Edward Cooke	Lifford		
Charles Coote	Maryborough		
Isaac Corry	Newry		
Sir Edward Crofton	County Roscommon		
John Philpot Curran	Kilbeggan		
Denis Daly	County Galway		
Denis Bowes Daly	Galway Town		
Barry Denny	County Kerry	Created a baronet 1782	
Hayes St Leger	Doneraile	Succeeded as 2nd Viscount Doneraile 1787	
Richard Hely	Taghmon		
Sir John Doyle	Mullingar		
James Blackwood	Killyleagh	Elected 1788	
Henry Prittie	County Tipperary		
Henry Duquery	Armagh		
John Maxwell	County Cavan		
Charles FitzGerald	County Kildare		
Lord Edward FitzGerald	Athy		Patriot
James FitzGerald	Tulsk		
Sir Frederick Flood	Ardfert		
Henry Flood	Kilbeggan		Patriot
John Foster	County Louth		
John Thomas Foster	Ennis		
John William Foster	Dunleer		
Lodge Evans de Montmorency	Bandonbridge		
Arthur French	County Roscommon		
Luke Gardiner	County Dublin		
Sir William Godfrey	Tralee		
John Prendergast Smyth	Limerick City	Elected 1785	
Henry Grattan	Charlemont		Patriot
Richard Griffith	Askeaton		
Cornelius Grogan	Enniscorthy		
Sackville Hamilton	Clogher		
Arthur Pomeroy	County Kildare		
Henry Pomeroy	Strabane		
Francis Hardy	Mullingar		
Cornwallis Maude	Roscommon	Created Baron de Montalt, 1785	
Sir Samuel Hayes	Augher		
Thomas Taylour	Kells		
John Hely	Cork City		
John Hely	Taghmon		
Arthur Hill	County Down		
Joseph Hoare	Askeaton	Created a baronet 1784	
Peter Holmes	Banagher		
Hugh Howard	Athboy		
John Cradock	Clogher		
Robert Jephson	Granard		
Robert Jocelyn	Dundalk		
John Allen Johnson	Baltinglass		
Sir Richard Johnston	Blessington		
Theophilus Jones	Monaghan		
John Browne	Carlow	created 1st Baron Kilmaine 1789	
Hercules Rowley	County Antrim		
Hercules Langrishe	Knocktopher		
Charles Loftus	Wexford	Created Baron Loftus 1785	
Richard Longfield	Baltimore		
George Lowther	Newtownards	Died August 1784	
Gorges Lowther	County Meath		
Henry Luttrell	Old Leighlin	Succeeded as Earl of Carhampton 1787	
Sir James May	County Waterford		
John Monck Mason	St Canice		
Henry Meredyth	Armagh		
Alexander Montgomery	County Donegal		Patriot
George Montgomery	County Cavan		
John Montgomery	County Monaghan		
John Moore	Ballynakill		
William Wellesley	Trim		
Stephen Moore	Clonmel		
George Sandford	Roscommon		
Sir Edward Newenham	County Dublin		Patriot
John Toler	Philipstown		
Sir Lucius O'Brien	Tuam		
George Ogle	County Wexford		
Charles O'Hara	County Sligo		
John O'Neill	County Antrim		
John Butler	Kilkenny City		
Walter Butler	Kilkenny City		
John Proby Osborne	Carysfort	Died December 1787	
Thomas Osborne	Carysfort		
Sir William Osborne	Carysfort	Died November 1783	
Thomas Pakenham	Longford		
Sir John Parnell	Queen's County		
Sir William Parsons	King's County		
Edmund Pery	Limerick City	Speaker 1771–85	
George Ponsonby	Inistioge		
John Ponsonby	Newtownards	Died August 1787	
William Ponsonby	County Kilkenny		Whig
Thomas Knox	Dungannon		
Pery Edmund Sexton	Dungannon		Patriot
George Rawson	Armagh		
William Richardson	County Armagh		
William Richardson	Augher		
Boyle Roche	Portarlington	Elected 1784	
Laurence Harman	County Longford		
Robert Cuninghame	Monaghan		
Charles Ruxton	Ardee		
John Ruxton	Ardee		
Sir Richard St George	Athlone		
Sir Richard St George	Athlone		
Alleyne FitzHerbert	Carysfort	Elected 1788;Chief Secretary for Ireland, 1787–89	
John Scott	Portarlington	Created Baron Earlsfort 1784	
Hon. Chichester Skeffington	Antrim		
William John Skeffington	Antrim		
Michael Smith	Randalstown		
Thomas Smyth	Limerick City	Died 1785	
John Staples	Newtown Limavady		
Richard Malone	Banagher		
John Preston	Navan		
Hercules Taylour	Kells		
Charles Tottenham	Clonmines		
Charles Tottenham	New Ross		
John Townsend	Dingle		
Richard Boyle Townsend	Dingle		
John Tydd	Ardfert		
James Cuffe	County Mayo		
Edward Ward	County Down		
Sir Augustus Louis Carre Warren	Cork City		
George Nugent	Fore		
Thomas Whaley	Newcastle		
Arthur Wolfe	Coleraine		
Owen Wynne	Sligo		
Barry Yelverton	Carrickfergus		
