= Matthew Deane =

Matthew Deane may refer to:

- Sir Matthew Deane, 1st Baronet (c. 1626–1711) of the Deane Baronets
- Sir Matthew Deane, 3rd Baronet (c. 1680–1747), Irish MP for Charleville and Cork County
- Sir Matthew Deane, 4th Baronet (c. 1706–1751), his son, Irish MP for Cork City
- Matthew Deane (actor) (born 1978), Thai actor and TV host

== See also ==
- Matt Dean, Minnesota politician
- Deane (surname)
