= Robert Deane, 1st Baron Muskerry =

Irish politician

Robert Tilson Deane, 1st Baron Muskerry PC (Ire) (29 November 1745 – 25 June 1818), known as Sir Robert Deane, 6th Baronet from 1770 to 1781, was an Irish politician.

He was the son of Sir Robert Deane, 5th Baronet of Dromore and succeeded his father in the baronetcy in 1770.

Deane represented Carysfort in the Irish House of Commons between 1771 and 1776 and then County Cork between 1776 and 1781. He was also appointed High Sheriff of County Cork for 1773 and admitted to the Irish Privy Council in 1777. From 1780 to his death he was Custos Rotulorum of County Limerick.

In 1781 he was raised to the Peerage of Ireland as Baron Muskerry, in the County of Cork. In 1783, he was chosen Grandmaster of the Grand Lodge of Ireland, a post he held for the next both years.

== Marriage and succession ==
Lord Muskerry married Anne, daughter of John FitzMaurice, in 1775 and later inherited Springfield Castle, County Limerick from his father-in-law. He died in June 1818, aged 72, and was succeeded in his titles by his eldest son John. Lady Muskerry died in 1830.

Parliament of Ireland
Preceded by Sir Robert Deane, Bt; Sir William Mayne, Bt	Member of Parliament for Carysfort; 1771–1776; With: Sir William Mayne, Bt	Succeeded by Thomas Osborne; Warden Flood
Preceded by Richard Townsend; John Hyde	Member of Parliament for County Cork; 1776–1781; With: Richard Townsend	Succeeded by Richard Townsend; James Bernard
Masonic offices
Preceded by The Earl of Mornington	Grand Master of the Grand Lodge of Ireland; 1783–1785	Succeeded by Viscount Kilwarlin
Peerage of Ireland
New creation	Baron Muskerry; 1781–1818	Succeeded by John Deane
Baronetage of Ireland
Preceded by Robert Deane	Baronet (of Muskerry); 1770–1818	Succeeded by John Deane
