= Maria Elizabetha Jacson =

Early 19thC English botanist and author

- Born: 1755; Bebington, Cheshire, England
- Died: 10 October 1829 (aged 73–74); Chelford, Cheshire, England
- Occupations: Writer, botanist
- Known for: Botanical writings (Linnaean)
- Notable work: Botanical Lectures By A Lady
- Parent(s): Rev. Simon Jacson, Anne Fitzherbert
- Relatives: Frances Jacson (sister)

Maria Elizabetha Jacson (1755 – 10 October 1829) was an eighteenth-century English writer, as was her sister, Frances Jacson (1754–1842), known for her books on botany at a time when there were significant obstacles to women's authorship. In some sources her name appears as Maria Jackson, Mary Jackson or Mary Elizabeth Jackson. (Note: A number of sources confuse Miss Mary E Jacson of Somersal (Britten & Boulger 1889, p. 181) with Miss Mary A(nn) Jackson of Lichfield (Britten & Boulger 1889, p. 180) (fl. 1830s–1840s), botanical illustrator, (Desmond 1994, Jackson, Mary Ann p. 377) daughter of John Jackson of the Lichfield Botanical Society (Desmond 1994, Jackson, John p. 377) and author of Botanical Terms illustrated (1842) and Pictorial Flora (1840)) She spent most of her life in Cheshire and Derbyshire, where she lived with her sister following her father's death.

Social conventions of the time obliged her to publish anonymously. She was influenced by Erasmus Darwin at a time when the new but controversial sexual classification of plants proposed by Linnaeus was becoming known in England. She published four books on the topic.

== Life ==
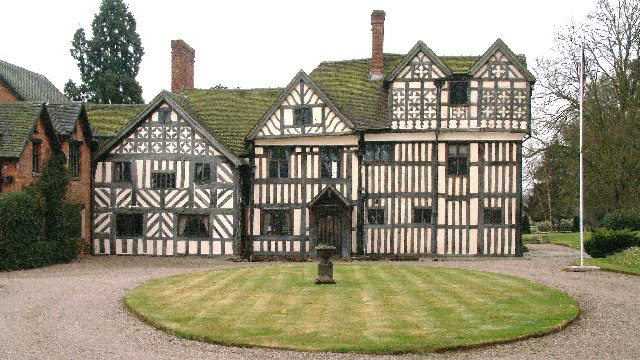
Somersal Hall, Derbyshire, home of the Jacson sisters from 1808

Maria and Frances were two of five surviving children of the Anglican rector of Bebington, Cheshire, the Rev. Simon Jacson (1728–1808), and his wife Anne FitzHerbert (c. 1729 – 1795), the oldest daughter of Richard FitzHerbert of Somersal Herbert in Derbyshire. The family had been landowners and clergy in both Cheshire and Derbyshire since the early seventeenth century. Their elder brother Roger (1753–1826) succeeded his father as rector in 1771, after which the family moved to Stockport (1777–1787), Cheshire and then Tarporley in the same county, where her father became rector. Although their sister, Anne (d. 1805) married, both Maria and Frances remained single, and looked after their father after he was widowed in 1795 and suffered from failing health till his death in 1808.

While they were at Tarporley, the family became worried about their other brother Shallcross (died 1821), also an ordained priest, who had taken to drink and horse-racing. The need to pay off his debts was the spur for the sisters to turn to writing. On their father's death in 1808, they had to find a new home and accepted an offer made by their FitzHerbert cousin, Lord St Helens (1753–1839) to lend them Somersal Hall, a partly Tudor home in Somersal Herbert, Derbyshire, for life. The Hall was the ancestral home of the FitzHerberts and when Frances FitzHerbert died (1806), the inheritance passed to her nephew Roger Jacson, who sold it, but was then repurchased by Lord St Helens, descendant of a different line of FitzHerberts. Shallcross's problems resurfaced, with debts totalling £1760. Francis paid these off with her earnings from two further novels and with help from Roger and Maria. Shallcross died in 1821. The Jacson children were cousins to Sir Brooke Boothby, at nearby Ashbourne and a member of the Lichfield Botanical Society which brought them into contact with Enlightenment culture through Erasmus Darwin and other contemporary writers on science, as well as the literary circle of Anna Seward at Lichfield, Staffordshire.

In 1829, while the sisters were staying with friends at Astle Hall, Chelford, in Cheshire, Maria became suddenly ill, with a fever, and died on 10 October 1829 leaving her sister desolate.

== Work ==
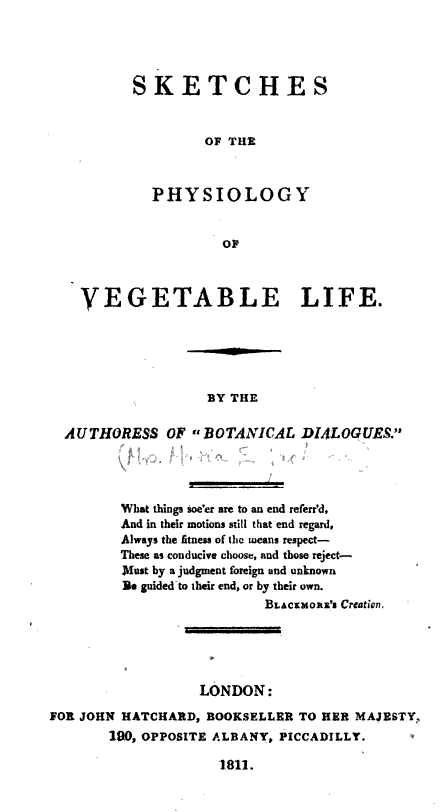
Title Page, Sketches 1811

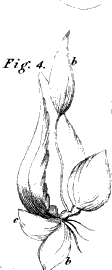
Iris Xiphium, from Sketches

Maria Jacson showed early signs of gifts in relation to botany, through drawing, horticulture and plant experiments. Darwin describes a drawing she made in 1788 of a Venus fly-trap, stating that she was "a lady who adds much botanical knowledge to many other elegant acquirements". Maria Jacson, who was part of the first generation of women science writers, is known for her writings on botany. Her publisher placed a commendation by both Darwin and Boothby ("so accurately explaining a difficult science in an easy and familiar manner") amongst the prefaces to her first book, Botanical Dialogues (1797) written at the age of forty two, which was well received. (Note: This was originally a letter from Darwin and Boothby to Jacson written in 1795 (King-Hele 2007, (85-14) To Maria E Jacson, 24 August 1795 pp. 482–483, and notes)) Darwin also recommended Maria's work in his Plan for the Conduct of Female Education of that year;

But there is a new treatise introductory to botany called Botanic dialogues for the use of schools, well adapted to this purpose, written by M. E. Jacson, a lady well skilled in botany, and published by Johnson, London.

However the book did not pass beyond a first edition, possibly because it was too advanced for the young audience for whom it was intended.

For this reason she reworked the material into a more adult format in Botanical Lectures By A Lady (1804). She described the latter as follows "a complete elementary system, which may enable the student of whatever age to surmount those difficulties, which hitherto have too frequently impeded the perfect acquirement of this interesting science".

She was familiar with the Lichfield Botanical Society's translation of Linnaeus' System of Vegetables (1785), for which she intended her Botanical Lectures as an introduction, but in a society that disapproved of female education, and in particular the new sexual classification of plants, she trod warily between the Linnaeans and contemporary propriety. She completed three books on Linnaean botany and plant physiology and a fourth on horticulture. Her Florist's Manual went into several editions. In her writing she faced two important obstacles, the backlash against educated women as typified by Richard Polwhele and his hostile satirical poem The Unsex'd Females (1798) and the moral concerns of a society that felt that such a delicate matter as the sexual reproduction of plants was inappropriate matter for 'female modesty' to be exposed to. Her sexual politics is evident in her resistance to Linnaeus' primacy of male sexual features in his classification system, (Note: Linnaeus first classified plants into Classes based on the number of Stamens, and then within the classes defined Orders based on the number of pistils, hence Hexandria (six stamens) Trigynia (three pistils).) emphasising that the female pistil is of equal importance to the male stamen.

Given the constraints on women writers of the times her books were published anonymously 'by a lady' but the introduction of Botanical Lectures is signed with the initials M.E.J. At the very end of the third edition (1827) of Florist's Manual, appear the words "Maria Elizabeth Jackson, Somersal Hall, Uttoxeter, Staffordshire." Since this contains a number of errors, it is possible it was added by the publisher. The first edition ends with "M.E.J., Somersal Hall". Her earlier writing was very much under the influence of Darwin, however her Sketches of the Physiology of Vegetable Life (1811), marked a new independent direction, which she illustrated with her own drawings.

Her appreciation of the constraints placed on women writers was apparent, even in her first book, where she wrote that women must

avoid obtruding their knowledge upon the public. The world have agreed to condemn women to the exercise of their fingers, in preference to that of their heads; and a woman rarely does herself credit by coming forward as a literary character.

She carefully ascribes the norms she describes as those of the 'world' rather than herself, but steps back from challenging them, by advising her daughters of the dangers of being known for what you know.

=== Botanical Dialogues 1797 ===
Botanical Dialogues Between Hortensia and her Four Children, Charles, Harriet, Juliette and Henry Designed For the Use in Schools (1797) as the name suggests is constructed as conversations between her mother and her children. It makes reference to Darwin's versified botanical descriptions of The Botanic Garden (1791). It utilises the sexual differences of plants to point out the different social roles that her sons and daughters are destined to fulfil by society on account of their sex, reflections that are often bitter. While outlining the social norms, she is also at pains to distance herself from them.

== Works ==
- Botanical Dialogues 1797
- Botanical Lectures By A Lady 1804 (revised edition of Dialogues, for a wider audience)
- Sketches of the Physiology of Vegetable Life 1811
- A Florist's Manual 1816

== Bibliography ==
- Carter, Philip (Spring 2013). "Shapers of the West Midlands Enlightenment" (PDF). West Midlands History Issue 1. pp. 13–16. Archived from the original (PDF) on 3 April 2015.
- Darwin, Erasmus (1797). A plan for the conduct of female education, in boarding schools, private families, and public seminaries. By Erasmus Darwin, M.D. F.R.S. author of Zoonomia, and of The botanic garden; To which are added, Rudiments of taste, in a series of letters from a mother to her daughters; Embellished with an elegant frontispiece. Derby: J. Johnson.
- George, Sam (30 January 2014). "Carl Linnaeus, Erasmus Darwin and Anna Seward: Botanical Poetry and Female Education". Science & Education. 23 (3): 673–694. Bibcode:2014Sc&Ed..23..673G. doi:10.1007/s11191-014-9677-y. S2CID 142994653.
- Kelley, Theresa M. (2012). Clandestine marriage botany and Romantic culture. Baltimore, Md.: Johns Hopkins University Press. ISBN 9781421407609.
- King-Hele, Desmond, ed. (2007). The collected letters of Erasmus Darwin. Cambridge: Cambridge Univ. Press. ISBN 9780521821568.
- Page, Judith W.; Smith, Elise L. (2011). Women, literature, and the domesticated landscape: England's disciples of Flora, 1780-1870. Cambridge: Cambridge University Press. ISBN 9780521768658.
- Polwhele, Richard (1810). Poems. London: Rivington's.
  - Polwhele, Richard (1798). "The Unsex'd Females: A Poem, Addressed to the Author of the Pursuits of Literature. London: Printed for Cadell and Davies, in the Strand. 1798". University of Virginia Library. (Etext including author's original notes)
- Shteir, Ann B. (1996). Cultivating women, cultivating science: Flora's daughters and botany in England, 1760-1860. Baltimore: Johns Hopkins University Press. ISBN 978-0-8018-6175-8.
- Shteir, Ann B. (1990). "Botanical Dialogues: Maria Jacson and Women's Popular Science Writing in England". Eighteenth-Century Studies. 23 (3 Spring): 301–317. doi:10.2307/2738798. JSTOR 2738798.
- Stafford, William (2002). English Feminists and Their Opponents in the 1790s: Unsex'd and Proper Females. Manchester University Press. ISBN 9780719060823.
- Widder, Agnes Haigh. "Botanical Dialogues, Between Hortensia and Her Four Children, Charles, Harriet, Juliette and Henry. Designed for the Use of Schools, by a Lady. London, Printed for J. Johnson, 1797". Women and Botany in 18th and Early 19th-Century England. Michigan State University Libraries.

=== Works ===
- Jacson, Maria Elizabetha (1797). Botanical Dialogues Between Hortensia and her Four Children, Charles, Harriet, Juliette and Henry Designed For the Use in Schools by a Lady. London: J Johnson. (Published as By a Lady)
- ——— (1804). Botanical Lectures by a Lady, Altered From 'Botanical Dialogues For the Use of Schools', and adapted to the use of persons of all ages, by the same author. London: Johnson. (Published as By a Lady; Introduction signed M.E.J.)
- ——— (1811). Sketches of the Physiology of Vegetable Life. London: Hatchard. (Published as By The Authoress of Botanical Dialogues)
- ——— (1816). The Florist's Manual, or, Hints for the Construction of a Gay Flower-Garden: with Directions for Preventing the Depredations of Insects... (1 ed.). London: Henry Colburn. (Published as By The Authoress of Botanical Dialogues and Sketches of The Physiology Of Vegetable Life . 2nd ed. 1822)
- ——— (1827) [1816]. The Florist's Manual, or, Hints for the Construction of a Gay Flower-Garden: with Directions for Preventing the Depredations of Insects... (3 ed.). London: Henry Colburn.

=== Reference materials ===
- Percy, Joan. "Jacson, Frances Margaretta (1754–1842)". Oxford Dictionary of National Biography (online ed.). Oxford University Press. doi:10.1093/ref:odnb/40495. (Subscription, Wikipedia Library access or UK public library membership required.)
- Shteir, Ann B. "Jacson, Maria Elizabetha (1755–1829))". Oxford Dictionary of National Biography (online ed.). Oxford University Press. doi:10.1093/ref:odnb/40494. (Subscription, Wikipedia Library access or UK public library membership required.)
- Desmond, Ray (1994) [1977]. Dictionary of British and Irish botanists and horticulturalists : including plant collectors, flower painters and garden designers (2 ed.). London: Taylor & Francis. ISBN 9780850668438.
- Britten, J; Boulger, GS (1889). "Biographical Index of British and Irish Botanists". Journal of Botany, British and Foreign. 27.
