= John Sale =

John Sale may refer to:

- John Sale (singer)
- John Bernard Sale (1779–1856), his son, English organist
- John Sale (politician)
