= Lord Muskerry =

Lord Muskerry may refer men with the title:

- Viscount Muskerry
- Baron Muskerry
