= Charles Osborne (politician) =

Irish politician

Charles Osborne, MP (1760 – 5 September 1817), was an Irish politician and judge.

== Biography ==
He was born in County Waterford, the fifth son of Sir William Osborne, 8th Baronet and his wife Elizabeth Christmas of Whitfield, daughter of Thomas Christmas. He sat as a member of parliament in the Irish House of Commons for Carysfort between 1790 and 1800.

He went to school in Drogheda, and attended Trinity College Dublin, graduating in 1780. He entered Lincoln's Inn and was called to the Bar in 1788, becoming King's Counsel in 1798. He was appointed a Commissioner for Revenue Appeals, and later standing counsel to the Revenue.

After the Acts of Union 1800, which he supported, he was appointed a Justice of the King's Bench for Ireland, serving from 1802 until 1817, being styled The Hon Mr Justice Osborne. His political opponents said that his appointment was entirely due to his support for the Union, and that he lacked the requisite legal ability to be fit for judicial office. Despite his successful career in the House of Commons he seems to have been a curiously obscure figure: Elrington Ball goes so far as to suggest that most barristers had never heard of him at the time of his elevation to the Bench, despite his having served as Revenue counsel since 1793. On the other hand, Ball thought that his Parliamentary career gave him a wider experience of public life than some of his judicial colleagues.

In 1803 he was sent to Ulster to try some of those involved in the Irish rebellion of 1803. His conduct of the trials exposed him to the scurrilous attacks of the pamphleteer "Juverna", who was later exposed as an embittered judicial colleague of Osborne, Robert Johnson. Johnson was tried for seditious libel and forced to resign from the Bench in disgrace. In 1814 Osborne was one of the judges at the trial of the publisher John Magee on a charge of seditious libel. In the course of the trial he clashed bitterly with Daniel O'Connell, who was defence counsel. O'Connell had a poor opinion of Osborne, although it must be said that he had an equally low opinion of most of Osborne's judicial colleagues, even those who were friends of his. Osborne also sat as one of the judges in the leading quo warranto case of Rex v O'Grady in 1816.

He died of typhus on 5 September 1817 at his house at Temple Street, Dublin, and was buried at his local parish church, the Old Church of St George, Hill Street Dublin, which was popularly known as "Little St George's". Only the tower of the church now survives.

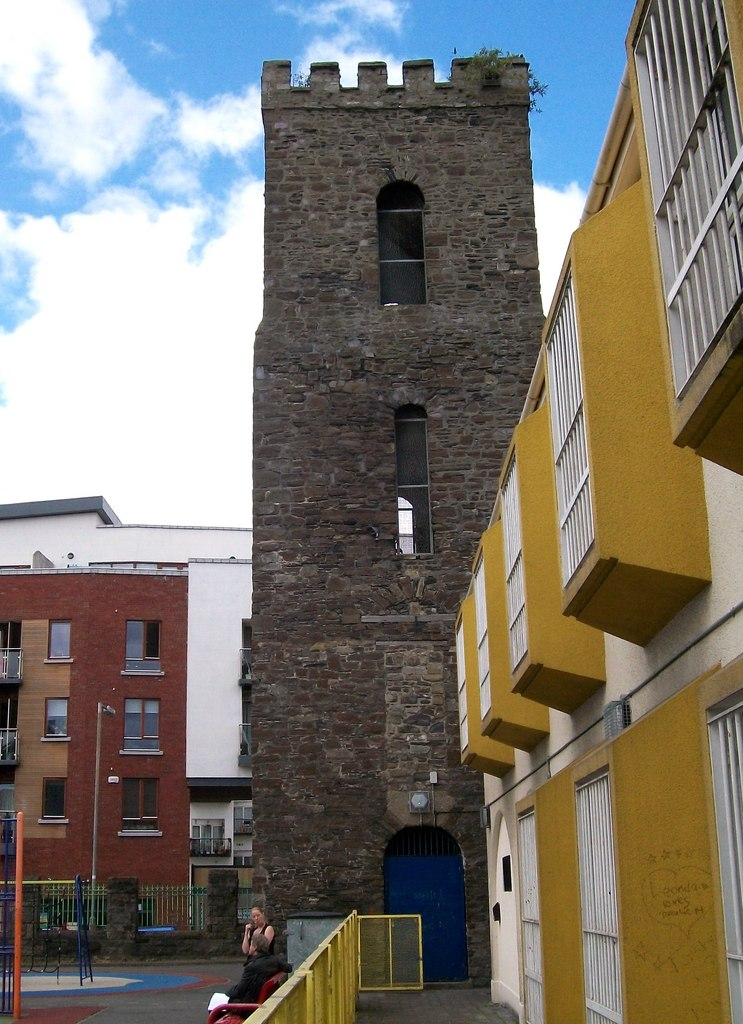
The tower of St George's Church, Hill Street, Dublin, where Osborne is buried

== Marriage and issue ==
Charles Osborne married on 14 August 1793 his cousin Alicia Christmas (died 16 May 1847), daughter of Thomas Christmas of Whitfield, MP for County Waterford, and had two children:

- Elizabeth Osborne (died 7 February 1833), married on 1 January 1823 General Sir Michael Creagh KH (died 14 September 1860), and had issue, including Major General William Creagh
- William Osborne (May 1794 – 13 July 1867), Major in the 71st (Highland) Regiment of Foot, married on 7 July 1831 Helen Colt, daughter of John Hamilton Colt of Gartsherrie, but died without issue

== Sources ==
- Ball, F. Elrington The Judges in Ireland 1221–1921 London John Murray 1926
- Geoghegan, Patrick M. King Dan: the rise of Daniel O'Connell 1775–1829 Gill & Macmillan 2008
- Charles Mosley, editor, Burke's Peerage, Baronetage & Knightage, 107th edition, 3 volumes (Wilmington, Delaware, U.S.A.: Burke's Peerage (Genealogical Books) Ltd, 2003), volume 2, page 3031.

== Notes ==
Parliament of Ireland
Preceded by Alleyne FitzHerbert; Sir Thomas Osborne	Member of Parliament for Carysfort; 1790–1801; With: Sir Thomas Osborne to 1798; Sir Henry Osborne 1798–1799; Robert Aldridge 1799–1800; Mark Singleton 1800	Constituency abolished Acts of Union 1800
