= Frances Jacson =

English novelist (1754–1842)

- Born: 13 October 1754; Bebington, Cheshire, England
- Died: 17 June 1842 (aged 87); Somersal Herbert, Derbyshire, England
- Relatives: Maria Jacson (sister); Henry Gally Knight (nephew); Lord St Helens (cousin)

Frances Margaretta Jacson (born 13 October 1754 at Bebington, Cheshire, died 17 June 1842 at Somersal Herbert, Derbyshire) was an English novelist. Her work shows a strong moral purpose and insight into relationships and marriages.

== Family commitments ==
Frances Jacson was one of five surviving children of the Anglican rector of Bebington, Rev. Simon Jacson (1728–1808), and his wife Anne Fitzherbert (c. 1729–1795), daughter of Richard Fitzherbert of Somersal Herbert. Her elder brother Roger succeeded his father as rector, after which the family moved to Stockport and then Tarporley, Cheshire, where her father became rector. She and her sister Maria Elizabetha Jacson (1755–1829) remained single, and looked after their father after he was widowed in 1795.

While the family were at Tarporley, they became worried about Frances's other brother Shallcross (died 1821), also an ordained priest, who had taken to drink and horse-racing. The need to pay off his debts was the spur for the sisters to turn to writing. Frances completed two successful novels. On their father's death in 1808, they had to find a new home and accepted an offer made by their cousin Lord St Helens to lend them Somersal Hall for life. Shallcross's problems resurfaced, with debts totalling £1760. Francis paid these off with her earnings from two further novels and with help from Roger and Maria.

She was desolated by the death of her sister in 1829, but eventually resumed her social life among the county gentry and her extended family. Her favourite nephew Henry Gally Knight (a Tory) kept her in touch with politics, in which she was a firm Whig and supporter of parliamentary reform. She also remained a firm Christian.

== Publications ==
Jacson's first novel, Plain Sense (1795; second e.: London: William Lane at the Minerva Press, 1796; third e. 1799) was immediately popular and followed by a second, Disobedience (London: William Lane at the Minerva Press, 1797). These and her subsequent novels appeared anonymously.

Things by their Right Names (London: George Robinson, 1812; second e. "by the author of Plain Sense: London: G. & S. Robinson; Gale, Curtis & Fenner, 1814) was followed by Rhoda. A Novel ("By the author of Things by their Right Names. London: Henry Colburn & Co., 1816 [two eds]), for which she turned to one of the foremost London novel publishers. It is considered "the more accomplished" of the two. The second pair of novels were wrongly ascribed to the Scottish writer Mary Brunton. Jacson's authorship was not suggested until 1823. There were further false attributions in the early twentieth century to Alethea Lewis.

Despite the financial motives behind her writing activity, Jacson never abandoned her moral purpose, so that her novels are didactic, all featuring a heroine in relatively high society. Through them she shows strong creative insight, especially into burgeoning relationships and marriage. In most cases her heroines discern flaws in the perceptions of themselves and others. There is much irony in the portrayal of several minor characters. Rhoda was preferred to Jane Austen's Emma by Maria Edgeworth, from whom the Jacson sisters received a social call in 1818. It was also recommended by Sydney Smith. Isabella ("By the author of Rhoda": London: Henry Colburn & Co., 1823) was written in a calmer period of Jacson's life. The "self-righteous loquacity" of Mrs. Nesbit has been compared to Mrs. Norris in Jane Austen's Mansfield Park. The French translation of this by Mme Collet in 1823, Isabelle Hastings, was wrongly ascribed to William Godwin. Even her diaries, kept from 1829 until her death, were thought for a time to be her brother's.

Jacson is also known to have written a religious pamphlet, Every Day Christianity (1816).

== See also ==
- Maria Elizabetha Jacson

== Bibliography ==
- Chawton House Library: Isabella (PDF); Things by their Right Names (PDF). Both retrieved 29 September 2022.
- Orlando Project: Retrieved 19 November 2010. Subscription required for most information. Archived 4 March 2016 at the Wayback Machine
- Percy, Joan. "Jacson, Frances Margaretta (1754–1842)". Oxford Dictionary of National Biography (online ed.). Oxford University Press. doi:10.1093/ref:odnb/40495. (Subscription, Wikipedia Library access or UK public library membership required.)
- Percy, Joan. "An Unrecognized Novelist: Frances Jacson (1754–1842)." The British Library Journal 23.1 (1997): 81–97. Reproduces an 1814 water colour portrait of Frances Jacson.
