= Alethea Lewis =

English novelist (1749–1827)

Alethea Lewis (born 19 December 1749, buried 12 November 1827) was an English novelist, born at Acton, near Nantwich, Cheshire. She also used the pseudonym Eugenia de Acton. Her subject-matter centres on her profound Christianity and her belief in the rewards of virtue. Her work displays great erudition.

== Life ==
Alethea's father, James Brereton, was an Anglican cleric. She was two years old when her mother died and her father sent her away to live with her maternal grandfather, who was a linen draper in Framlingham, Suffolk. Her father later remarried and had other daughters.

Alethea became engaged to William Springal Levett, son of an Aldeburgh physician and a friend of the poet George Crabbe, but he died in 1774 before they could marry. In 1788 she married Augustus Towle Lewis, a surgeon with a criminal past of which she may have been unaware. The couple lived in Philadelphia for a year, then returned to England and settled finally in Penkridge, Staffordshire, where she died in 1827.

== Work ==
Of the novels attributed to Lewis, some are unquestionably hers, but others more doubtful. The latter include Vicissitudes in Genteel Life (1794) and The Microcosm (1801). Some of the more uncertain works (Things by their Right Names, 1812, Rhoda, 1816, and Isabella, 1823) have also been attributed to Frances Jacson.

Lewis's themes mostly centre on her profound Christianity and the rewards of virtue. Her work is self-conscious and erudite. Some (Essays on the Art of being Happy, 1803, A Tale without a Title: Give it what you Please, 1804, The Nuns of the Desert, or, The Woodland Witches, 1805, and the four-volume The Discarded Daughter, 1810) were published under the pseudonym Eugenia de Acton. Her plots have been called "overcrowded and creaky", but with "a strain of creative unconventionality".
