= Warden Flood (1735–1797) =

Irish politician

Warden Flood (1735 – March 1797) was an Irish politician. He sat in the Irish House of Commons for nearly 30 years, as a Member of Parliament (MP) for Longford Borough from 1776 to 1783, for Carysfort from 1776 to 1783, for Baltinglass from 1783 to 1790, and for Taghmon from 1790 until his death in 1797.

He was a nephew of Warden Flood, who was Lord Chief Justice of Ireland and first cousin of Henry Flood.

Parliament of Ireland
Preceded by Henry Flood; David La Touche	Member of Parliament for Longford Borough; 1769–1776; With: David La Touche	Succeeded by John Tunnadine; David La Touche
Preceded by Sir Robert Deane, 6th Bt; Sir William Mayne, Bt	Member of Parliament for Carysfort; 1776–1783; With: Thomas Osborne	Succeeded by Sir William Osborne, 8th Bt; Thomas Osborne
Preceded by Hon. Benjamin Stratford; John Godley	Member of Parliament for Baltinglass; 1783–1790; With: James Somerville 1783; Sir John Johnson, 1st Bt 1784–90	Succeeded by Hon. John Stratford; Hon. Benjamin O'Neale Stratford
Preceded by Robert Stubber; Hon. John Hely-Hutchinson	Member of Parliament for Taghmon; 1790–1797; With: John Hely-Hutchinson 1790–1795; Charles McDonnell from 1795	Succeeded by Robert Rutledge; Charles McDonnell
