= Listed buildings in Somersal Herbert =

Somersal Herbert is a civil parish in the Derbyshire Dales district of Derbyshire, England. The parish contains twelve listed buildings that are recorded in the National Heritage List for England. Of these, one is listed at Grade I, the highest of the three grades, one is at Grade II*, the middle grade, and the others are at Grade II, the lowest grade. The parish contains the village of Somersal Herbert and the surrounding area. The major building in the parish is Somersal Herbert Hall, which is listed, together with associated structures. The other listed buildings are houses, a farmhouse, cottages and associated structures, a church and its lychgate, a churchyard cross and a telephone kiosk.

== Key ==
| Grade | Criteria |
|---|---|
| I | Buildings of exceptional interest, sometimes considered to be internationally important |
| II* | Particularly important buildings of more than special interest |
| II | Buildings of national importance and special interest |

== Buildings ==
| Name and location | Photograph | Date | Notes | Grade |
|---|---|---|---|---|
| Churchyard cross 52.91361°N 1.79888°W | | 15th century | The cross in the churchyard of St Peter's Church is in sandstone. It has a square base on two stone steps, and is surmounted by a tall octagonal shaft with a moulded top and the cusped base of a cross finial. | II |
| Somersal Herbert Hall; 52.91355°N 1.79774°W | | Early 16th century | A small timber-framed country house that was extended in 1564, partly encased in brick in 1712, and restored in 1899. There is lath and plaster infill, some close studding, some red brick, coved eaves, and tile roofs. There are two storeys and attics, and an irregular plan, with a south front of four gabled bays. The porch is timber-framed, and open on two sides with balusters. The windows are mixed; some are mullioned, others are mullioned and transomed, and there are cross-windows, and two gabled dormers. | I |
| Barn to rear of Montgomery House; 52.91403°N 1.79455°W | | 16th century | The barn is timber-framed with brick nogging on a stone plinth and a tile roof, and it was later extended and partly encased in red brick. In the north front the timber framing is exposed, and it contains a doorway and casement windows. The extension contains a cart entrance and windows, all with segmental-arched heads. | II |
| Montgomery House; 52.91388°N 1.79446°W | | Late 16th century | The house is timber-framed with infill in plaster and lath and in brick, and some rebuilding and extensions in red brick. The roofs are tiled, there is a dentilled eaves cornice, and the plan is of a hall and cross-wing, with two storeys and attics. The doorway has a moulded surround, and is dated. The windows are a mix of casements, and sashes with wedge lintels, and there are two gabled dormers. Inside there is exposed timber framing. | II* |
| Church Cottage; 52.91411°N 1.79927°W | | Early 17th century | The cottage was extended at each end in the 19th century. The original part has a timber-framed core with crucks, later encased in red brick, the extensions are in red brick, and the roof is tiled. There is a single storey with attics, and three bays. The doorway has a segmental head, two widows have segmental-arched heads, one has a flat head, and there is a gabled half-dormer. Inside there are two exposed crucks and an inglenook fireplace. | II |
| The Old Cottage; 52.91361°N 1.79510°W | | Early 17th century | The cottage is timber-framed with brick nogging and a thatched roof. There is a single storey and attics. The windows are casements, one in an eyebrow dormer. Inside there are inglenook fireplaces and exposed timber framing. | II |
| Gate piers and walls, Somersal Herbert Hall; 52.91389°N 1.79848°W | | Early 18th century | The gate piers at the entrance to the drive are in sandstone, and each pier is rusticated with a moulded cap, and an urn with swags. Attached to the piers are red brick walls with stone coping, running to the east for about 10 feet (3.0 m), and to the west to the churchyard. The walls have two chamfered set offs, and pilaster buttresses. | II |
| Outbuildings north of Somersal Herbert Hall; 52.91391°N 1.79777°W | | Early 18th century | The outbuildings, which were extended in the 19th century, have been partly converted for residential use. They are in red brick with some vitrified headers and have tile roofs, and there are two ranges forming an L-shaped plan. The doorways and windows have segmental-arched heads, there are gabled dormers, a circular pitching hole, and vents in various patterns. | II |
| Hill Farmhouse; 52.91598°N 1.79462°W | | Late 18th century | The farmhouse is in red brick with a tile roof. There are two storeys and an attic, and an L-shaped plan with a front range of three bays. The central doorway and the windows, which are casements, have segmental-arched heads. | II |
| St Peter's Church; 52.91370°N 1.79902°W | | 1874 | The tower was added in 1912. The church is built in sandstone and red brick, it has Welsh slate roofs, and consists of a nave, a south porch, a chancel and a west tower. The tower has angle buttresses, a polygonal stair turret rising higher than the tower, a three-light west window with a hood mould, and three lancets above. There is a clock face on each side, the bell openings have two lights, and above is a string course and an embattled parapet. The east window is in Perpendicular style and has five lights and a hood mould. The porch has rusticated quoins and a massive lintel with a keystone. | II |
| Lychgate, St Peter's Church; 52.91380°N 1.79858°W | | c. 1920 | The lychgate at the entrance to the churchyard has a chamfered sandstone base, on which is a timber superstructure and a hipped tile roof. The gates have curved tops, and there is some wrought iron work. | II |
| Telephone kiosk 52.91396°N 1.79765°W | | 1935 | The K6 type telephone kiosk in Church Lane was designed by Giles Gilbert Scott. Constructed in cast iron with a square plan and a dome, it has three unperforated crowns in the top panels. | II |
