= Sir Thomas Osborne, 9th Baronet =

Irish politician (1757 - 1821)

Sir Thomas Osborne, 9th Baronet, MP (1757 – 3 June 1821) was an Irish baronet and politician.

== Biography ==
He was the eldest son of Sir William Osborne, 8th Baronet and his wife Elizabeth née Christmas, daughter of Thomas Christmas and Elizabeth Marshall.

Sir Thomas sat as a Member of Parliament in the Irish House of Commons for Carysfort between 1776 and 1797 and served as High Sheriff of County Waterford in 1795, having succeeded to the baronetcy upon his father's death in 1783.

== Marriage and issue ==
Osborne married on 6 April 1816 at St. Margaret's Church, Rochester, Kent, Catherine Rebecca Smith (1796 - 10 October 1856). Catherine Rebecca Smith was the daughter of Major Robert Smith RM (1754 - Chatham, Kent, 2 July 1813) and his wife Margaret Ramsay (1766 - Newtown, Ireland, April 1839), and a granddaughter of the Revd James Ramsay and his wife Rebecca Akers.

Sir Thomas and Lady Osborne had two children:

- Sir William Osborne, 10th Baronet (1817 - 23 May 1824), succeeded in the baronetcy on 3 June 1821
- Catherine Isabella Osborne (30 June 1819 - 20/1 June 1880), married on 20 August 1844 Ralph Bernal Osborne (26 March 1808 – 4 January 1882), and had two daughters.

== See also ==
- Duke of St Albans

== Sources ==
- Charles Mosley, editor, Burke's Peerage, Baronetage & Knightage, 107th edition, 3 volumes (Wilmington, Delaware, U.S.A.: Burke's Peerage (Genealogical Books) Ltd, 2003), volume 2, page 3031.
- Marriage to Catherine Rebecca Smith at CityARK
- Ancestry.com

Parliament of Ireland
Preceded by Sir Robert Deane; Sir William Mayne	Member of Parliament for Carysfort; 1777–1798; With: Warden Flood to October 1783; Sir William Osborne 1783; John Proby Osborne 1783–1788; Alleyne FitzHerbert 1788–1790; Charles Osborne from 1790	Succeeded by Sir Henry Osborne; Charles Osborne
Baronetage of Ireland
Preceded by Sir William Osborne	Baronet (of Ballentaylor and Ballylemon); 1783–1821	Succeeded by Sir William Osborne
