= Sir Robert Deane, 5th Baronet =

Irish barrister-at-law and politician (1707–1770)

Sir Robert Deane, 5th Baronet PC (Ire) (c. 1707 – 7 February 1770) was an Irish barrister-at-law and politician.

He was the third son of Sir Matthew Deane, 3rd Baronet and his wife Jane Sharpe, only daughter of Reverend William Sharpe. In 1751, he succeeded his older brother Matthew as baronet. He was invested to the Privy Council of Ireland in 1768 and represented Tallow in the Irish House of Commons from 1757 to 1768. The following year, he stood for Carysfort, a seat he held until his death in 1770.

On 24 August 1738, he married Charleton Tilson, second daughter of Thomas Tilson. They had six daughters and four sons. Robert, the oldest surviving son, succeeded to the baronetcy and was later raised to the Peerage of Ireland as Baron Muskerry, while his younger brother Jocelyn Deane was also a Member of Parliament.

Parliament of Ireland
Preceded by John Colthurst; Sir Henry Cavendish, 1st Bt	Member of Parliament for Tallow; 1757–1768; With: Sir Henry Cavendish, 1st Bt 1757–1761; Samuel Bagshaw 1761–1763; James Gisborne 1763–1768	Succeeded by Nicholas Lysaght; Hugh Cane
Preceded by Sir William Osborne, 8th Bt; Sir William Mayne, 1st Bt	Member of Parliament for Carysfort; 1769–1770; With: Sir William Mayne, 1st Bt	Succeeded by Sir Robert Deane, 6th Bt; Sir William Mayne, 1st Bt
Baronetage of Ireland
Preceded by Matthew Deane	Baronet (of Muskerry); 1751–1770	Succeeded by Robert Deane
