= Sir Henry Osborne, 11th Baronet =

Irish politician

Sir Henry Osborne, 11th Baronet (1759 – 27 October 1837), was an Irish baronet and politician.

== Biography ==
The fourth (but second surviving) son of the Rt. Hon. Sir William Osborne, 8th Baronet and wife Elizabeth Christmas, he succeeded in the baronetcy upon his nephew's death on 23 May 1824. Henry Osborne was elected to the Irish House of Commons as Member of Parliament for Carysfort in 1798 and for Enniskillen, County Fermanagh, in 1800. He voted against the Act of Union in 1799 in order to retain Irish independence from Great Britain and, reputedly refusing government bribes, voted against it again in 1800 when the legislation was finally enacted.

== Marriages and issue ==
Sir Henry Osborne married firstly Harriet Toler, daughter of Daniel Toler, of Beechwood MP for County Tipperary, and niece of John Toler, 1st Earl of Norbury, by his wife (m. November 1760) Rebecca Minchin (1749 – September 1800), and had three children:

- Eliza Osborne (died 3 August 1853), married in 1804 Thomas Gibbon Fitzgibbon, of Ballyseeda, County Limerick, son of Gibbon Fitzgibbon, of Ballyseeda (died 1781), and wife Margaret (daughter of Piers Lynch, of Rafiladown), and had issue
- Harriet Osborne (died Caen, 10 December 1865), married a doctor Jean Costy, of Luc-sur-Mer, Normandy
- Sir Daniel Osborne, 12th Baronet (10 December 1783 – 25 March 1853), succeeded in the baronetcy on 27 October 1837, married in January 1805 Lady Harriet Le Poer Trench (September 1785 – 17 November 1855), daughter of William, 1st Earl of Clancarty and wife Anne née Gardiner, and had seven children:
  - Thomas Frederick Osborne (died 18 February 1846), Major in the Madras Army, married on 25 July 1842 his cousin Anne Letitia Trench (died 18 February 1846), daughter of the Hon. and Ven. Charles Le Poer Trench (qv. Earl of Clancarty) and wife Frances Elwood, and had one son:
    - unnamed Osborne son (died an infant 16 October 1862)
  - Emily Osborne (died 31 December 1866), married on 1 July 1851 as his second wife Philip Jocelyn Newton (23 March 1818 – 20 April 1895), educated at Eton College, lived at Dunleckney Manor, Bagenalstown, who was High Sheriff in 1846, Deputy Lieutenant and Justice of the Peace of County Carlow, and had female issue
  - Anne Osborne (died 29 May 1864), married on 16 December 1834 Major-General George Wynne (1804 – 27 June 1890), Colonel-Commandant of the Royal Engineers
  - Harriette Osborne, married on 27 December 1836 John Scott Russell (died 1 June 1882), natural son of Agnes Clarke Scott and the Rev. David Russell DD
  - Frances Osborne (1783 – February 1840), married on 5 February 1829 the Rev. Joseph Forde Leathley
  - Sir William Osborne, 13th Baronet, JP, DL (16 October 1805 – 2 July 1875), succeeded in the baronetcy on 25 March 1853, Deputy Lieutenant and Justice of the Peace, married on 22 July 1842 Maria Thompson (died 25 October 1875), daughter of William Thompson, of Clonfin, County Longford, without issue
  - Sir Charles Stanley Osborne, 14th Baronet (30 June 1825 – 16 July 1879), of Beechwood Park, Co. Tipperary, succeeded in the baronetcy on 2 July 1875, married firstly on 13 July 1846 Emilie de Reuilly (died 20 December 1869), daughter of Jean baron de Reuilly (of Picardy), having no issue, and married secondly on 8 July 1873 Emma Webb (died 17 May 1909), daughter of Charles Webb, of Clapham Common, London, without issue

Sir Henry married secondly on 12 June 1813 Elizabeth Harding (1795 – 9 January 1864), daughter of William Harding, of Ballyduff, Co. Tipperary, and had one son:

- Charles Osborne (13 July 1816 – 15 June 1871), married on 26 August 1852 Ann Geary (1832 – 30 November 1923), daughter of Stephen Geary, of Euston Place, London, and had seven children:
  - Catherine Alice Osborne (1850 – 18 January 1941), married on 13 September 1890 Charles Edward Comyn (died 3 May 1947)
  - Eleanor Osborne (died 15 March 1960), married on 2 April 1890 Eugene de Sully (died 7 June 1938)
  - Isabella Henrietta Osborne (13 July 1853 – 8 January 1939), married firstly on 25 May 1880 Samuel Alfred Probart JP, of Graaff-Reinet, Cape Province (died 20 June 1881), and married secondly on 15 January 1887 Weeden Dawes (died 1946), of The Nook, Hampstead, London
  - Elizabeth Emily Osborne (9 February 1855 – 17 January 1933), unmarried and had no issue
  - Sir Francis Osborne, 15th Baronet, JP (1 November 1856 – 23 October 1948), succeeded to the baronetcy on 16 July 1879, committee member of the Standing Council of the Baronetage and Justice of the Peace for Sussex, married on 1 July 1890 at St Peter, Cranley Gardens to Kathleen Eliza Whitfield of Modreeny, County Tipperary, and of South Kensington, London (died 22 January 1953), daughter of George Whitfield JP, and had five children:
    - Dorothy Eileen Osborne, of Littlebourne House, Kent (3 May 1891 – 1958)
    - Kathleen Muriel Osborne (9 March 1893 – 1982), married on 17 October 1922 John "Jack" Chambers, of Minnesota, son of William Chambers, Mayor of Hamiota, Manitoba
    - Sir George Francis Osborne, 16th Baronet (27 July 1894 – 21 July 1960)
    - Derrick Osborne (9 December 1897 – France, 21 March 1918), Lieutenant in the Durham Light Infantry, killed in action during World War I, unmarried without issue
    - Rosemary Estelle Osborne (23 July 1907 – 8 June 1968), married on 7 November 1935 Donald McEwen McIntyre, son of William McIntyre of Comrie, Perthshire
  - Constance Osborne (9 August 1859 – 30 September 1938), unmarried without issue
  - The Hon. Edward Osborne (21 January 1861 – 21 January 1939)

== See also ==
- Osborne baronets

== Sources ==
- Mosley, Charles, ed. (2003). Burke's Peerage, Baronetage & Knightage. Vol. 2 of 3 volumes (107th ed.). Wilmington, Delaware, USA: Burke's Peerage (Genealogical Books) Ltd. pp. 2904 and 3031.
- Montgomery-Massingberd, Hugh, ed. (1976). "Minchin". Burke's Irish Family Records. London, UK: Burkes Peerage Ltd: 47, 48, 431 and 842.
- 2nd Earl of Clancarty Richard Le Poer Trench (1874). Memoir of the Le Poer Trench Family. Dublin, Ireland: privately. p. 27.
- Bernard, Sir Burke, ed. (1958). Burke's genealogical and heraldic history of the landed gentry of Ireland (4th ed.). London, UK: Burkes Peerage Ltd. pp. 411 and 412.

Parliament of Ireland
Preceded by Sir Thomas Osborne, Bt; Charles Osborne	Member of Parliament for Carysfort; 1798–1799; With: Charles Osborne	Succeeded by Robert Aldridge; Charles Osborne
Preceded by The Hon. Lowry Cole; Arthur Cole-Hamilton	Member of Parliament for Enniskillen; 1800–1801; With: Arthur Cole-Hamilton	Parliament of the United Kingdom Constituency recreated
Baronetage of Ireland
Preceded by Sir William Osborne	Baronet (of Ballentaylor and Ballylemon); 1824–1837	Succeeded by Sir Daniel Toler Osborne
