= Carysfort (Parliament of Ireland constituency) =

Pre-1801 Irish constituency

- Former borough constituency for the Irish House of Commons
- County: County Wicklow
- Borough: Carysfort (now Macreddin)

1629–1801
- Seats: 2
- Replaced by: Disfranchised

Carysfort was a borough constituency for Carysfort, now Macreddin, in County Wicklow represented in the Irish House of Commons until its abolition on 1 January 1801.

== History ==
In the Patriot Parliament of 1689 summoned by James II, Carysfort was represented with two members.

== Members of Parliament, 1634–1801 ==
- 1634–1635 Guildford Slingsby. and John Hoey
- 1639–1649 Philip Mainwaring and Francis Cosbie
- 1661–1666 Thomas Maule and John Boswell

=== 1689–1801 ===
Election	First MP	Second MP
1689	Hugh Byrne	Pierce Archbold (Note: Elected, but never took his seat)
1689	Hugh Byrne	Bartholomew Polewheele
1692	Richard Edwards	Thomas Whitshed
1695	William Hoey	Edward Stratford
1698	Hugh Eccles	Edward Stratford
September 1703	Hugh Eccles	Thomas Burroughs (Note: Declared not duly elected in 1703)
1703	Hugh Eccles	Richard Thompson
1713	Hugh Eccles	Robert Allen
1715	Hugh Eccles	John Sale
1717	Edward Webster	John Sale
1727	James Tynte (Note: Also elected for Youghal in 1727, for which he chose to sit)	John Sale
1728	Richard Hull	John Sale
1733	Richard Hull	Hon. John Allen
1743	Richard Hull	Stephen Trotter
1761	Sir William Osborne, 8th Bt (Note: Also elected for Dungarvan in 1768, for which he chose to sit)	William Mayne (Note: Created a baronet in 1763)
1769	Sir Robert Deane, 5th Bt	William Mayne
1771	Sir Robert Deane, 6th Bt	William Mayne
1777	Thomas Osborne (Note: Succeeded as 9th Baronet in 1783)	Warden Flood
October 1783	Thomas Osborne	Sir William Osborne, 8th Bt
1783	Thomas Osborne	John Proby Osborne
1788	Thomas Osborne	Alleyne FitzHerbert
1790	Thomas Osborne	Charles Osborne
1798	Henry Osborne	Charles Osborne
1799	Robert Aldridge	Charles Osborne
1800	Mark Singleton	Charles Osborne
1801	Disenfranchised	

== Bibliography ==
- O'Hart, John (2007). The Irish and Anglo-Irish Landed Gentry: When Cromwell came to Ireland. Vol. II. Heritage Books. ISBN 0-7884-1927-7.
- Leigh Rayment's historical List of Members of the Irish House of Commons. Cites: Johnston-Liik, Edith Mary (2002). The History of the Irish Parliament 1692-1800 (6 volumes). Ulster Historical Foundation.
