= Somersal Herbert Hall =

Country house in Derbyshire, England

Coordinates: 52.9137°N 1.7981°W

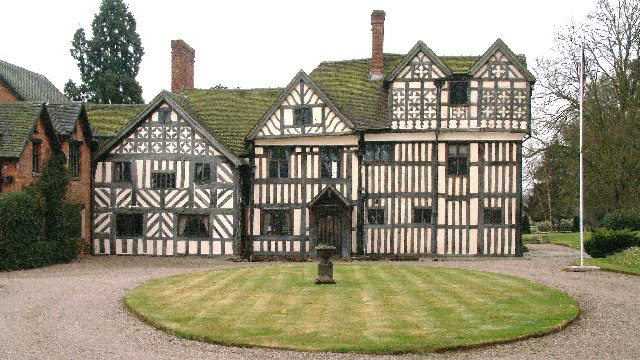
The timbered frontage of the Hall: unusual for a Derbyshire property, which are usually stone fronted

Somersal Herbert Hall is a privately owned timber-framed 16th-century country house at Somersal Herbert, near Ashbourne, Derbyshire, in England. It is a Grade I listed building.

The FitzHerbert family came to Somersal in the 13th century when the estate was acquired by Thomas FitzHerbert, second son of Sir William FitzHerbert of Norbury. The present timber-framed house was built by John FitzHerbert on the site of an earlier manor house in 1564. The entrance front at the south and other parts were encased in brick in 1712, when the property was enlarged.

The Somersal line of the FitzHerbert family was extinct on the death of Richard FitzHerbert in 1803. The estate was initially sold in 1806 outside the family but was later repurchased by his cousin Alleyne FitzHerbert, 1st Baron St Helens, younger brother of Sir William FitzHerbert, Bt of Tissington. He lent it in 1808 for life to cousins of his, the novelist Frances Jacson (1754–1842) and her sister Maria Jacson (1755–1829), a writer on botany and gardening, who were in financial straits caused by a spendthrift brother. In about 1850, Sir Henry FitzHerbert, Bt, enlarged the house by the addition of a north wing for his second son Richard who was in occupation of the house in 1881. His son Anthony emigrated to New Zealand and the estate was sold.

It was modernised and restored in 1899; further restoration work was carried out in 2004.

== See also ==
- Grade I listed buildings in Derbyshire
- Listed buildings in Somersal Herbert
