= Custos Rotulorum of County Limerick =

The Custos Rotulorum of County Limerick was the highest civil officer in County Limerick. The position was later combined with that of Lord Lieutenant of Limerick.

== Incumbents ==
- 1673–1679 Roger Boyle, 1st Earl of Orrery
- C1704–?1720 George Evans (died 1720)
- 1769–1780 Thomas Southwell, 1st Viscount Southwell
- 1780–1818 Robert Deane, 1st Baron Muskerry
- 1818–1850 Windham Henry Quin, 2nd Earl of Dunraven and Mount-Earl

For later custodes rotulorum, see Lord Lieutenant of Limerick
