= Sir Matthew Deane, 3rd Baronet =

Irish baronet and politician

Sir Matthew Deane, 3rd Baronet (c. 1680 – 11 March 1747) was an Irish baronet and politician.

He was the son of Sir Robert Deane, 2nd Baronet of Muskerry and Springfield Castle, County Limerick, and his wife Anne Brettridge, one of the three daughters and co-heiresses of Captain Roger Brettridge (1630-1683) of Castles Brettridge, Cope and Magner, County Cork and his wife Jane Hakby. Another source has his wife as Anne Bettridge, daughter of Colonel William Bettridge. He succeeded to the baronetcy in 1712.

He served as High Sheriff of County Cork for 1714 and sat in the Irish House of Commons for Charleville from 1713 to 1715. He was again a Member of Parliament (MP) for County Cork from 1728 until his death in 1747.

Deane married Jane Sharpe, only daughter of Reverend William Sharpe. They had three daughters and three sons. Deane was succeeded in the baronetcy by his oldest son Matthew. On the latter's death in 1751 the title devolved to the third son Robert.

Parliament of Ireland
Preceded by George Evans; Robert FitzGerald	Member of Parliament for Charleville; 1713 – 1715; With: Brettridge Badham	Succeeded by George Evans; William Boyle
Preceded by Henry Boyle; St John Brodrick	Member of Parliament for County Cork; 1728 – 1747; With: Henry Boyle	Succeeded by Henry Boyle; Arthur Hyde
Baronetage of Ireland
Preceded by Robert Deane	Baronet (of Muskerry); 1712 – 1747	Succeeded by Matthew Deane
