= Edward Webster =

Edward Webster (before 1691 - 1755) was Member of the Parliament of Ireland for Carysfort from 1717 to 1727 and Chief Secretary to The Duke of Bolton as Lord Lieutenant of Ireland from 1717 to 1720.

Political offices
Preceded by Martin Bladen and Charles Delafaye	Chief Secretary for Ireland; 1717–1720	Succeeded by Horatio Walpole
Parliament of Ireland
Preceded by Hugh Eccles; John Sale	Member of Parliament for Carysfort; 1717–1727; With: John Sale	Succeeded by James Tynte; John Sale
