= Macreddin =

Hamlet in County Wicklow, Ireland

Macreddin Maigh Chríodáin
- Hamlet
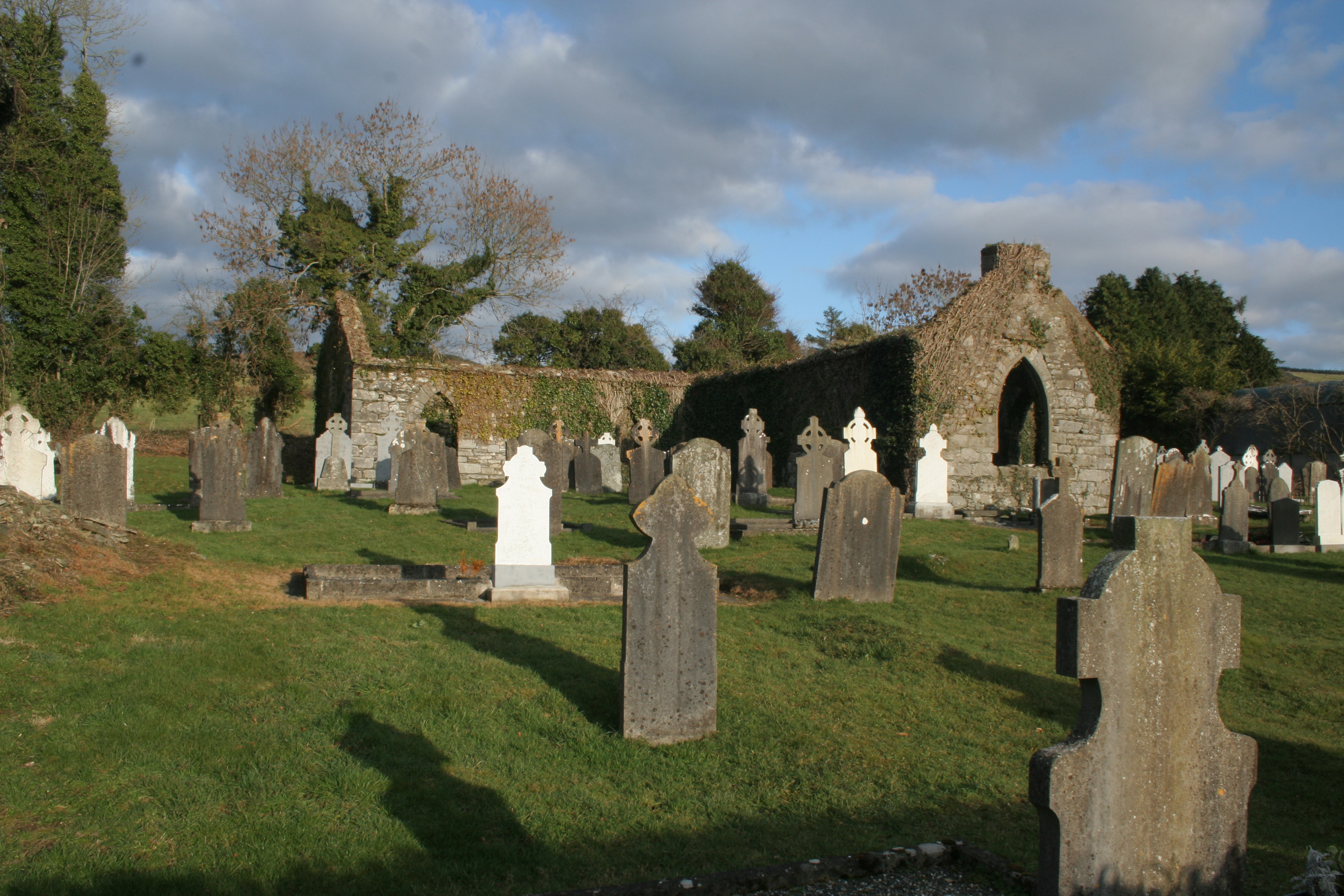
- The ruined Catholic church and Upper Macreddin Cemetery

- Location in Ireland
- Coordinates: 52.8842°N 6.3309°W
- Country: Ireland
- Province: Leinster
- County: County Wicklow
- Elevation: 160 m (520 ft)
- Irish Grid Reference: T12348278

Macreddin (Irish: Maigh Chríodáin, meaning 'plain of Cridan'; formerly also Moycreedin; formerly officially Carysfort, also Cariesfort), is a hamlet in County Wicklow, in the southern foothills of the Wicklow Mountains, 4 km north of Aughrim on the back road to Greenan. The historical borough is in the townland of Macreddin West in the civil parish of Ballykine, barony of Ballinacor South. It also gives its name to the adjacent townland of Macreddin East.

Wicklow County Council's 2010 development plan recognises the site as an "area of archaeological potential and significance" as "site of one of the few 17th century Plantation Towns established in Leinster". The pre-1800 parliamentary borough of Carysfort and the title Earl of Carysfort derive from Carysfort.

== History ==
The name Macreddin is believed to come from the Irish Magh Chrídáin "plain of Cridan". In 1875, John O'Hanlon identified him as a Celtic Christian saint "Criotan, Credan, Credanus, or Cridanus", son of Iladon, who was also venerated at nearby Aghavannagh, and in Cornwall. Price says he was more likely a local chieftain at the time Saint Kevin proselytized the area. Macreddin was granted to the monastery of St Saviour, Glendalough in the 12th century. When the Diocese of Glendalough was merged with the Archdiocese of Dublin, Macreddin was transferred to the Priory of All Hallows in Dublin. On the Dissolution of the Monasteries under Henry VIII, it was transferred to Dublin Corporation.

County Wicklow was established in 1606 and the Dublin Castle administration sought to contain the threat to English planters from the Gaelic O'Toole and O'Byrne clans in the mountains. A fort was built at Macreddin while Henry Cary, 1st Viscount Falkland was Lord Deputy of Ireland in 1625-28, and named "Cary's fort" in his honour. Samuel Lewis records that the garrison was withdrawn to Dublin in the 1641 Rebellion and the site was captured from the English by the O'Byrnes. No visible trace of the fort remains; the site is reputed to be in "Castle Field".

In 1628, Carysfort was incorporated as a borough under a royal charter from Charles I. The corporation was to have the same powers as at Jamestown, County Leitrim. The 1835 report of the Commissioners into Municipal Corporations in Ireland stated the charter did not appear "ever to have been acted on for any corporate purpose, except that of returning Members to Parliament before the Union". The charter granted the 13 members of the corporation "600 acres of arable land and pasture, and 276 acres of bog, mountain, wood, and underwood" in free burgage, and three smaller parcels of land in socage to each fund a specific purpose: first the garrison, second a Protestant curate and glebe, and third a free school. A 1688 charter of James II restated these grants; but by 1835 all lands except the school's had been alienated.

The elevation of Carysfort was too high and settlers soon moved south down the valley to Aughrim. In the eighteenth century there was still a fairground at the crossroads, with "riotous" two-day fairs held at Whitsun and All Saints. Michael Dwyer stayed in Macreddin when repairing to the Wicklow Mountains after the 1798 Rising. The 1835 commissioners' report described Carysfort as "a small village, containing a few houses of the humblest class", and concluded, "There is but a thinly-scattered population in the neighbourhood, and neither trade or commerce of any kind in the village, and there seems to be no occasion whatever for reviving the corporation."

=== Religion ===
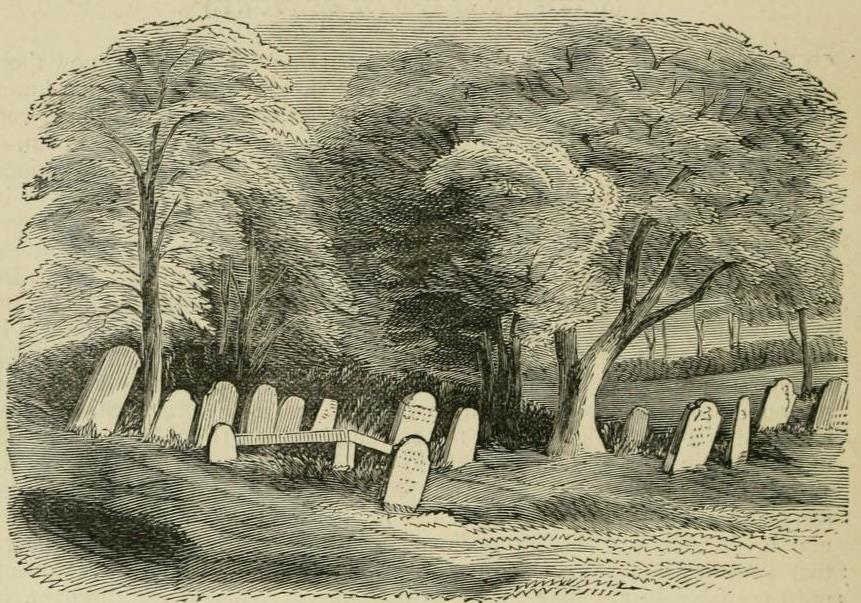
Moycreddin [sic] cemetery in 1874

In the Church of Ireland, Carysfort was a royal chapelry, originally with a thatched chapel by the school in Sheeana. It was within the perpetual curacy of Ballinaclash erected in 1832. A chapel of ease at Gallows Lane in Macreddin opened in 1869 to replace that at Sheeana; it was deconsecrated in 1991. The Catholic church was dedicated to Saint Brigid and Lewis in 1837 reported it as the parish church of Rathdrum. In 1864 it was rededicated to Laurence O'Toole; it is now in ruins. Upper Macreddin Cemetery is in the churchyard, while the larger Lower Macreddin Cemetery is further down the valley.

=== Royal School ===
Under the 1628 charter, Carysfort Royal School was established with a schoolhouse in the neighbouring townland of Sheeana More, to be funded from revenue of lands there. The revenue was not well used and the school was of poor quality; an 1810 work said "about 50 Boys attend in summer, but not above a dozen in winter". To resolve such abuses there and at other endowed schools, an 1813 Act of Parliament transferred management of the lands to Commissioners for Educational Endowments in Ireland. £500 was spent on a new building and in 1833 the school had 110 students funded from 361 acres. Whereas the other Royal Schools established by the Stuart kings were grammar schools, the Carysfort school was "a small, neglected, and inefficient primary school" and in 1887 the Commissioners recommended using its endowment to fund schools in more convenient locations in Aughrim and Rathdrum. In 1925 the management was transferred to the Department of Education of the new Irish Free State, where it is still vested.

=== Parliamentary borough ===
Carysfort was a borough constituency sending two MPs to the Irish House of Commons. It was a pocket borough of the Proby family, who took the title Baron Carysfort. It was disfranchised under the Act of Union 1800, and John Joshua Proby, 1st Earl of Carysfort received the standard £15,000 compensation for the loss of its patronage.

== Amenities ==
Southwest of the historical centre of the hamlet is a tourist complex comprising the Brooklodge Hotel, Wells Spa, "Macreddin Village" and golf club.
