= John Sale (politician) =

Irish politician

John Sale LL.D. MP

Member of the Irish House of Commons for Carysfort
- In office 1715–1732 Serving with Hugh Eccles (1715–17); Edward Webster (1717–27); James Tynte (1727–28); Richard Hull (1728–32)
- Monarchs: George I, George II
- Preceded by: Robert Allen
- Succeeded by: John Allen

Personal details
- Born: c. 1675
- Died: 7 July 1732 (age about 57)

John Sale (c. 1675 – 7 July 1732) was an Anglo-Irish politician of the 18th century.

== Biography ==
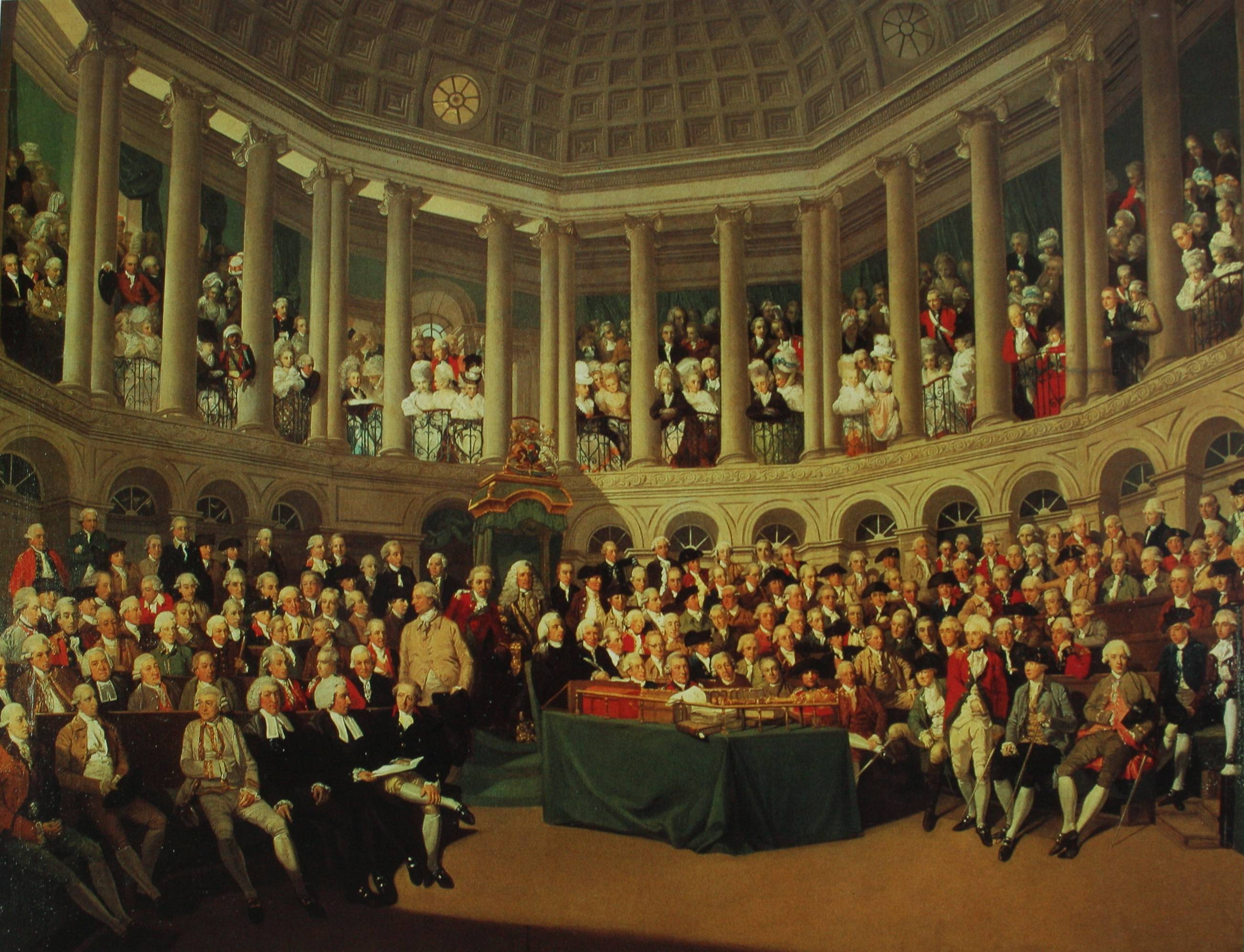
The Irish House of Commons painted by Francis Wheatley, 1780)

Sale was born around 1675. A "John Sale" was Sheriff of County Dublin in 1705; this may have been the same man.

He was a Doctor of Laws and later registrar of the Church of Ireland diocese of Dublin. He was elected to the Irish House of Commons in 1715 for the Carysfort borough and served there until his death in 1732.

== Family ==
Sale married Ellinor Desminières, daughter of Robert Desminières, a Sligo merchant of Huguenot extraction.

His eldest daughter Elizabeth married Richard Wesley, 1st Baron Mornington and was the mother of Garret Wesley, 1st Earl of Mornington; thus, John Sale was great-grandfather to Arthur Wellesley, 1st Duke of Wellington.
