= William Mayne, 1st Baron Newhaven =

British merchant and politician, Irish peer

William Mayne, 1st Baron Newhaven PC (1722 – 28 May 1794), known as Sir William Mayne, Bt, between 1763 and 1776, was a British merchant and politician who sat in the House of Commons from 1774 to 1790.

== Early life ==
Mayne was the eldest son of the second marriage of William Mayne, of Powis Logie, Clackmannanshire. He was employed in the family business of Mayne and Barn at Lisbon until 1757, when he returned to England. From 1757 to 1765, he was a director of the Royal Exchange Insurance Company and was recorded as a merchant in trade directories until 1780. He married the Honourable Frances Allen, daughter of Joshua Allen, 2nd Viscount Allen, and heiress of her brother John Allen, 3rd Viscount Allen, on 15 July 1758. Through his marriage, he gained considerable estates in Ireland.

== Political career ==
Mayne was eager to enter Parliament and stood at the 1761 British general election at Canterbury where he was defeated. He was, however, returned in 1761 to the Irish House of Commons for Carysfort, a seat he held until 1776. He was created a Baronet, of Marston Mortaine in the County of Bedford, in the Baronetage of Great Britain in 1763 and sworn of the Irish Privy Council in 1766. At the 1768 British general election he contested Malmesbury where he stood no chance against vested interests, after briefly considering Colchester.

By 1774 Mayne had acquired a seat at Gatton where he was returned and was also elected Member of Parliament for Canterbury, where he chose to sit. In 1776 he was elevated to the Peerage of Ireland as Baron Newhaven, of Carrick Mayne in the County of Dublin. He was defeated at Canterbury in the 1780 general election and returned himself and his brother Robert Mayne for Gatton instead. His brother died in 1782 and Mayne was returned Gatton for the last time in 1784. In 1786 he sold his property at Gatton and did not stand in 1790.

Escutcheon of Baron Newhaven

== Later life and legacy ==
Lord Newhaven died in May 1794. He and his wife, Frances, had one son who died in infancy and so the baronetcy and barony became extinct. What is now the city of Berlin, New Hampshire, was originally granted as "Maynesborough" in honor of Mayne.

Parliament of Ireland
| Preceded by Richard Hull; Stephen Trotter | Member of Parliament for Carysfort; 1761–1776; With: Sir William Osborne, Bt 1761–1769; Sir Robert Deane, Bt 1769–1771; Sir Robert Deane, Bt 1771–1776 | Succeeded by Thomas Osborne; Warden Flood |
Parliament of Great Britain
| Preceded by Richard Milles; William Lynch | Member of Parliament for Canterbury; 1774–1780; With: Richard Milles | Succeeded by George Gipps; Charles Robinson |
| Preceded by Robert Mayne; William Adam | Member of Parliament for Gatton; 1780–1790; With: Robert Mayne 1780–1782; Maurice Lloyd 1782–1787; James Fraser 1787–1790 | Succeeded by John Nesbitt; William Currie |
Baronetage of Great Britain
| New creation | Baronet (of Marston Mortaine); 1763–1794 | Extinct |
| Preceded by Fleming baronets | Mayne baronets of Marston Mortaine; 22 April 1763 | Succeeded by Horton baronets |
Peerage of Ireland
| New creation | Baron Newhaven; 1776–1794 | Extinct |
