= Robert Mayne =

British merchant, banker and politician

Robert Mayne (1724–5 August 1782) was a British merchant, banker and politician who sat in the House of Commons from 1774 to 1782.

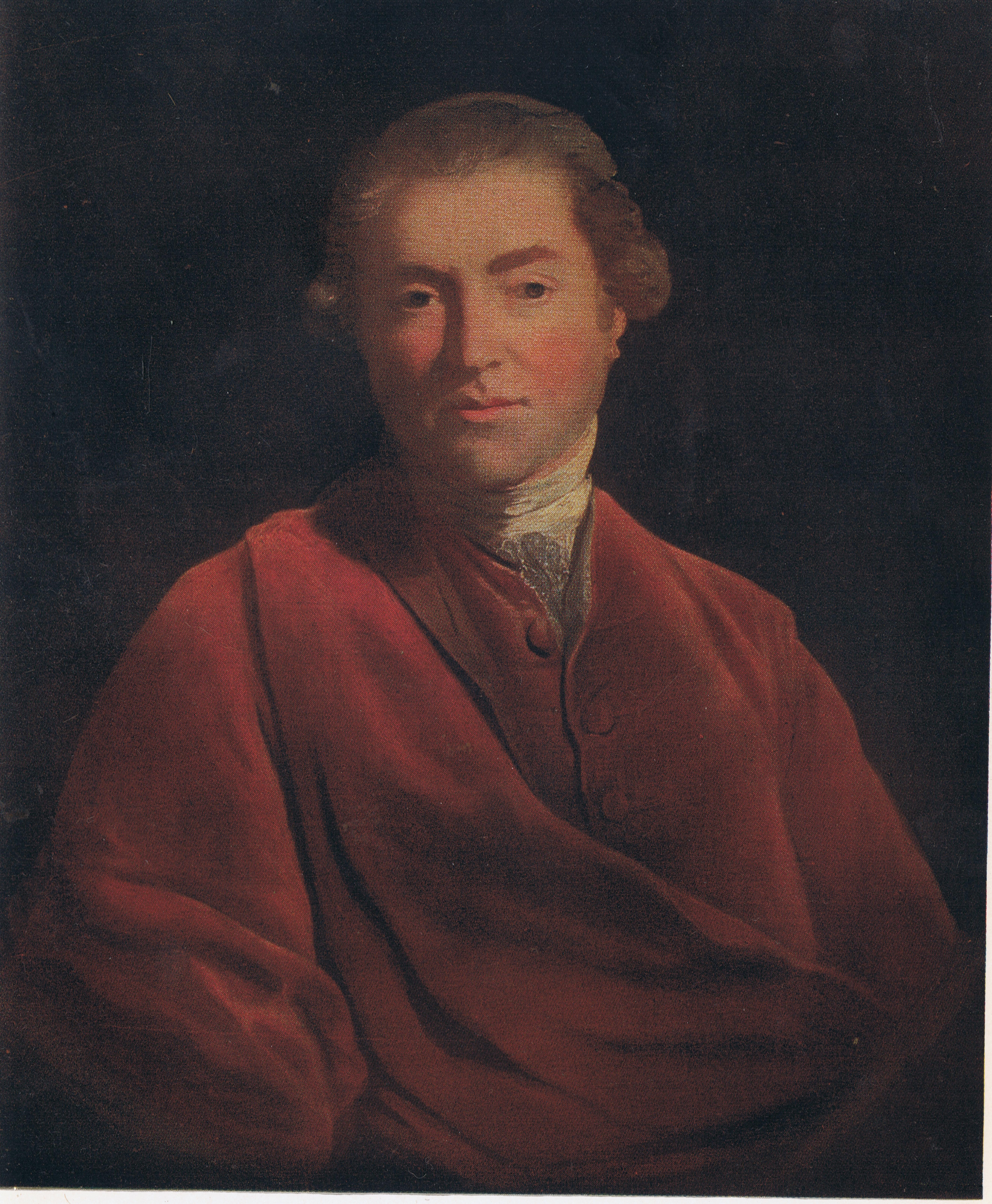
Robert Mayne by Joshua Reynolds.

Mayne was the fifth son of William Mayne of Powis Logie, Clackmannanshire and his second wife Helen Galbraith, daughter of William Galbraith of Balgair, Stirling. He married Anne Knight, daughter of John Knight on 24 October 1763. By 1770 he was a banker in Jermyn St and traded under various partnerships. He married as his second wife Sarah Otway, daughter of Francis Otway on 15 June 1775.

In 1774 Mayne's brother Sir William Mayne acquired control of both seats at Gatton. Robert Mayne was returned to replace his brother as Member of Parliament for Gatton at a by-election on 27 December 1774. While in Parliament he was also a major Government contractor provisioning troops in America or the West Indies with contracts from 1776 to 1782. In the 1780 general election he contested Stockbridge and Colchester where he was unsuccessful but was also returned again for Gatton. He supported the Administration of Lord North and is not recorded as having spoken in Parliament.

Mayne's business went bankrupt in 1782, and he committed suicide on 5 August 1782.

Parliament of Great Britain
Preceded by Sir William Mayne; Robert Scott	Member of Parliament for Gatton; With: William Adam 1774-1780; The Lord Newhaven 1780-1782	Succeeded by Maurice Lloyd; The Lord Newhaven
