= 1783 Irish general election =

Election to the 4th Irish Parliament of George III

All 300 seats in the House of Commons 151 seats needed for a majority
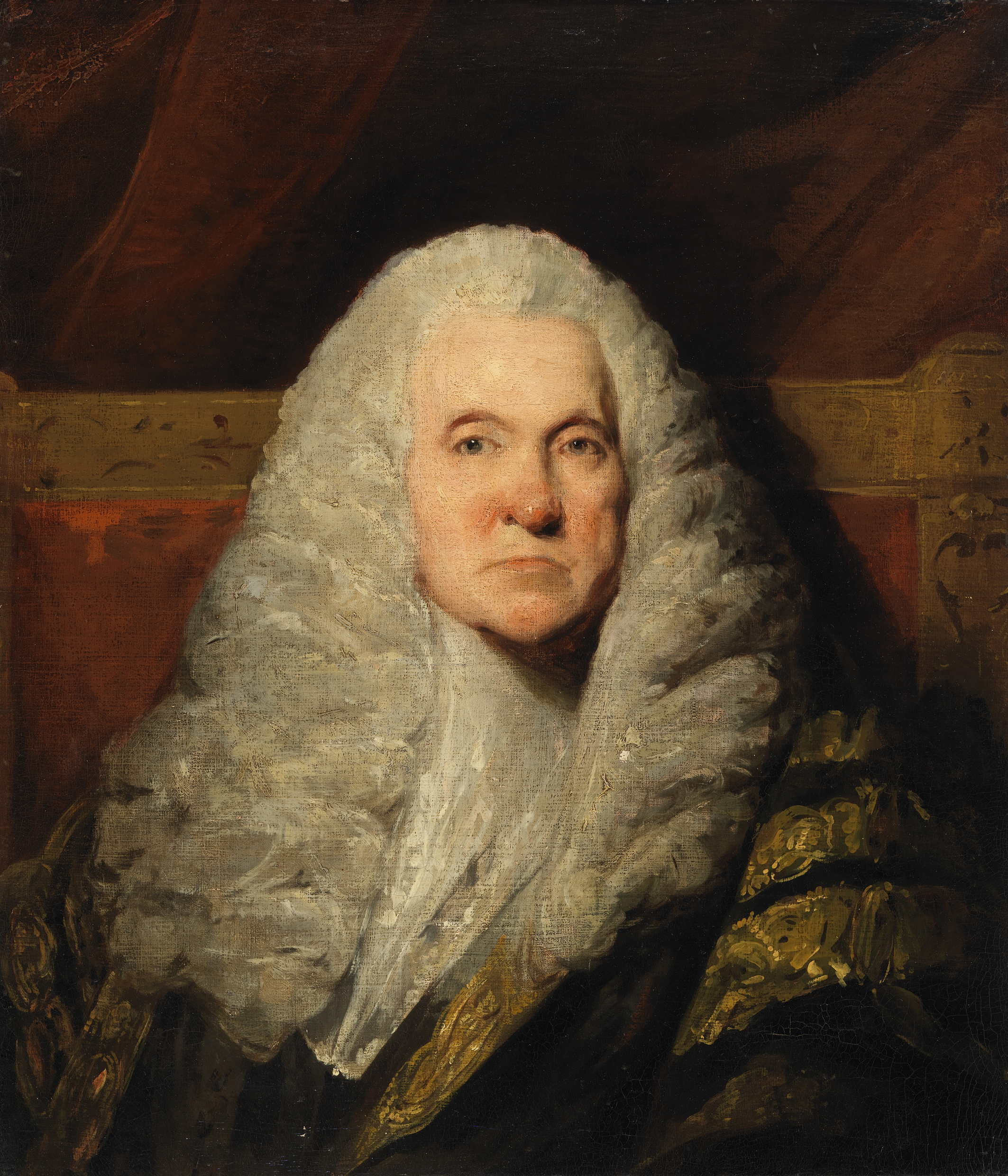

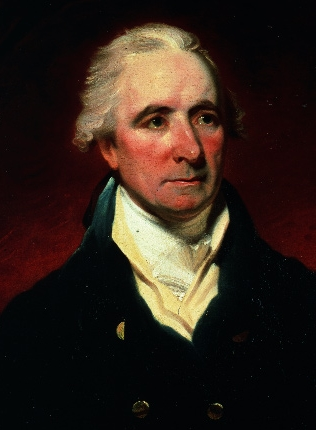
	First party	Second party
Leader	Viscount Lifford	Henry Grattan
Party	Junta	Patriot
Leader's seat		Charlemont
Speaker before election
Edmund Sexton Pery
Patriot
Elected Speaker
Edmund Sexton Pery
Patriot

The 1783 Irish general election was held in the Kingdom of Ireland in 1783, the first after the passing of the series of constitutional legal changes known as the Constitution of 1782, which lifted the substantial legal restrictions on the Irish parliament. The election was fought in a highly charged political atmosphere, with a major emphasis on the issues of parliamentary reform and free trade.

Following the election, Sexton Pery was re-elected Speaker. Henry Grattan, the leader of the Patriot Party, had rejected an office in government in 1782, choosing instead to continue his role in opposition. Instead, the Dublin Castle administration was undertaken by a group that was referred to by Edmund Burke as the Junta; dominated by individuals such as John FitzGibbon, the new Attorney General and later Lord Chancellor. John Foster was appointed as the Junta's Chancellor of the Exchequer, succeeding William Gerard Hamilton, who had treated the position as a sinecure posting. The new administration prioritised links with Great Britain, which from December 1783 was governed by Pitt the Younger.

== Background ==
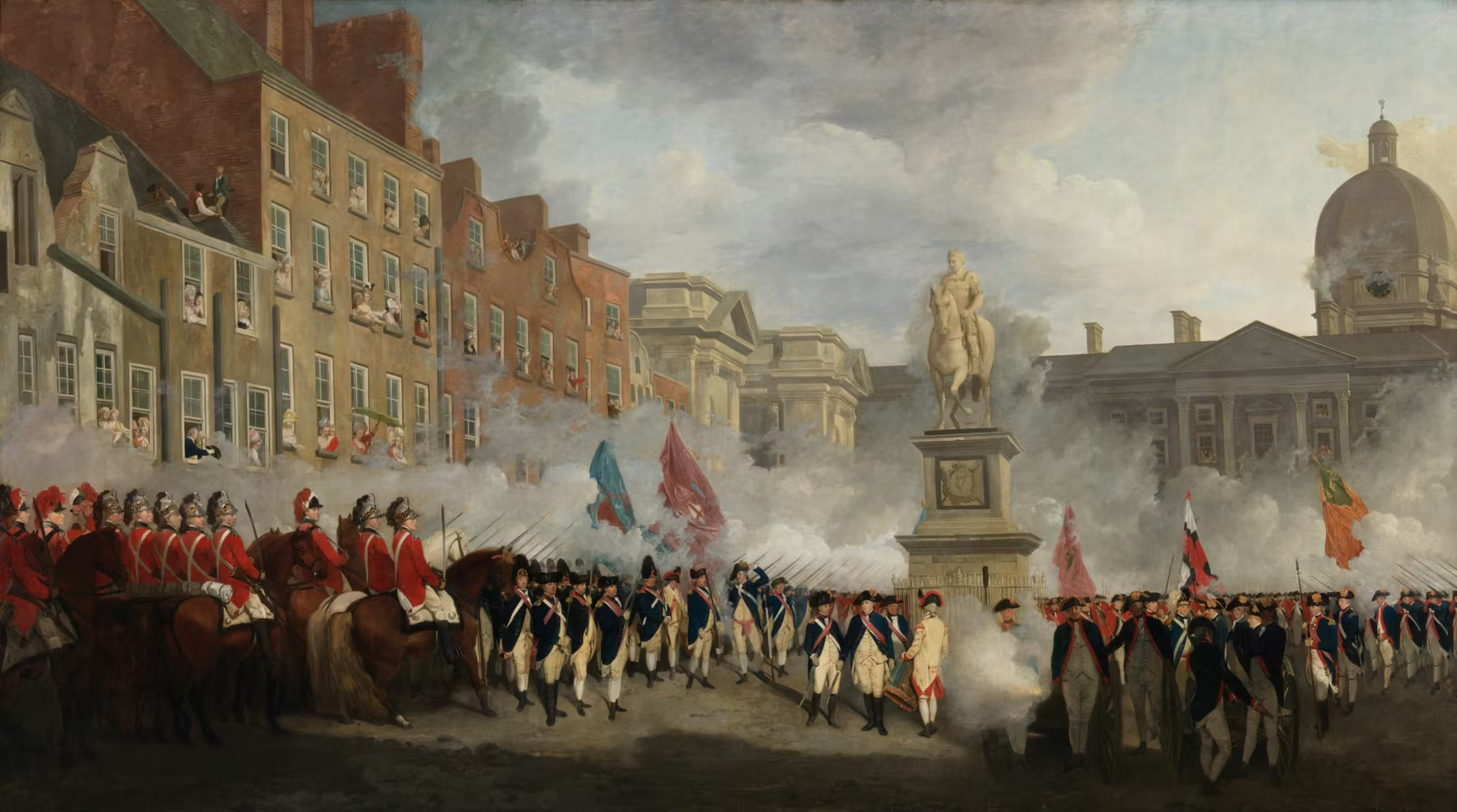
The Dublin Volunteers on College Green by Francis Wheatley, depicting the Dublin Volunteers on College Green on 4 November 1779

The preceding several years had seen great social upheaval in Ireland. The 1770s had seen Britain at war with France and Spain as part of the American Revolutionary War, and British forces stationed in Ireland had been dispatched to fight in the Thirteen Colonies. Claiming that Irish defences against potential invasion had been weakened by a negligent Dublin Castle Administration, the Irish gentry began forming Volunteer companies to defend defending Ireland. In fact only 4,000 soldiers had been dispatched to the American colonies, leaving as many as 9,000 behind in Ireland.

These Volunteer Companies were independent of both the Irish Parliament and Dublin Castle, and became characterised by their patriotic and liberal political leanings. The companies were as concerned about British interference in Irish politics as they were about resisting potential foreign invasions, and pushed for free trade between Ireland and Great Britain. At the time the Navigation Acts had meant that Irish exports faced tariffs when entering Britain, although British exports met no tariffs in Ireland. Facing pressure both from the Volunteer movement and the Irish Parliament, whilst simultaneously engaged in a war with France, Spain, and the American Colonies, the British government relented and enacted a series of legal changes granting greater legislative autonomy to the Irish parliament.

== Dates ==
At this period elections did not take place at the same time in every constituency. The returning officer in each county or parliamentary borough fixed the precise date (see hustings for details of the conduct of the elections).

== See also ==
- List of parliaments of Ireland
- MPs elected in the Irish general election, 1783
