= Sir William Osborne, 8th Baronet =

Irish politician

Sir William Osborne, 8th Baronet, PC (d. 30 September 1783) was an Irish baronet and politician.

== Biography ==
The son of Sir John Osborne, 7th Baronet and his wife Editha Proby, he succeeded in the baronetcy on 11 April 1743.

Osborne served as High Sheriff of County Waterford in 1750 and served as a Member of Parliament in the Irish House of Commons for Carysfort between 1761 and 1768, for Dungarvan between 1768 and 1783 and for Carysfort again in 1783, and was sworn of the Irish Privy Council in 1770.

== Marriage and issue ==
Sir William Osborne married (lic. 20 March 1749) Elizabeth Christmas, daughter of Thomas Christmas MP, of Whitfield, Co. Waterford and Elizabeth Marshall, and had eight children:

- Elizabeth Osborne (1754 - November 1783), married on 19 March 1774 as his first wife John Joshua Proby, 1st Earl of Carysfort (12 August 1751 – 7 April 1828)
- John Proby Osborne (1755 - December 1787), died unmarried without issue
- Revd. William Osborne, died unmarried without issue
- Ada Osborne, married her cousin Capt. Thomas Christmas and had issue
- unnamed daughter, died an infant
- Sir Thomas Osborne, 9th Baronet (1757 - 3 June 1821)
- Sir Henry Osborne, 11th Baronet (1759 - 27 October 1837)
- Rt. Hon. Charles Osborne (1760 - 5 September 1817) MP and judge of the Court of King's Bench (Ireland)

== See also ==
- Proby baronets

== Sources ==
- G.E. Cokayne; with Vicary Gibbs, H.A. Doubleday, Geoffrey H. White, Duncan Warrand and Lord Howard de Walden, editors, The Complete Peerage of England, Scotland, Ireland, Great Britain and the United Kingdom, Extant, Extinct or Dormant, new ed., 13 volumes in 14 (1910-1959; reprint in 6 volumes, Gloucester, U.K.: Alan Sutton Publishing, 2000), volume III, page 71.
- Charles Mosley, editor, Burke's Peerage, Baronetage & Knightage, 107th edition, 3 volumes (Wilmington, Delaware, U.S.A.: Burke's Peerage (Genealogical Books) Ltd, 2003), volume 2, page 3031.

Parliament of Ireland
| Preceded by Richard Hull; Stephen Trotter | Member of Parliament for Carysfort; 1761–1769; With: William Mayne | Succeeded by Sir Robert Deane; William Mayne |
| Preceded by Robert Boyle-Walsingham; Thomas Carew | Member of Parliament for Dungarvan; 1768–1783; With: Robert Carew 1768–1776; John Bennett 1776; Captain Godfrey Greene from 1777 | Succeeded by Marcus Beresford; Captain Godfrey Greene |
| Preceded by Warden Flood; Sir Thomas Osborne | Member of Parliament for Carysfort; October 1783 – November 1783; With: Sir Thomas Osborne | Succeeded by John Proby Osborne; Sir Thomas Osborne |
Baronetage of Ireland
| Preceded by Sir John Osborne | Baronet (of Ballentaylor and Ballylemon); 1743–1783 | Succeeded by Sir Thomas Osborne |
