= Richard Hull (died 1759) =

Richard Hull (died 21 June 1759) was an Anglo-Irish politician.

Hull was a Member of Parliament for Carysfort in the Irish House of Commons between 1728 and his death in 1759.

Parliament of Ireland
Preceded by James Tynte; John Sale	Member of Parliament for Carysfort; 1728–1759; With: John Sale (1728–1733); John Allen (1733–1743); Stephen Trotter (1743–1759)	Succeeded by Sir William Osborne, Bt; William Mayne
