= Robert Aldridge (MP) =

Irish politician

Robert Aldridge, later Robert Aldridge-Busby (c. 1768 – July 1837) was an Irish politician. He sat in the Irish House of Commons as a Member of Parliament (MP) for Carysfort from 1799 to 1800. In 1820, he changed his surname to Aldridge-Busby.

Parliament of Ireland
Preceded by Henry Osborne; Charles Osborne	Member of Parliament for Carysfort; 1799–1800; With: Charles Osborne	Succeeded by Mark Singleton; Charles Osborne
