= Mark Singleton (politician) =

Anglo-Irish Politician

Mark Singleton (1762 – 17 July 1840) was an Anglo-Irish politician. He sat in the House of Commons of Great Britain as an MP for the borough of Eye from 1796 to 1799, in the Irish House of Commons in 1800 as the Member of Parliament (MP) for the rotten borough of Carysfort in County Wicklow, and then in the House of Commons of the United Kingdom as an MP for Eye from 1807 to 1820.

Singleton was the third son of Dublin lawyer Sydenham Singleton (formerly Fowke) and his wife Elizabeth Whyte, only daughter of the Dublin attorney Mark Whyte. He was educated at Christ Church, Oxford and at Lincoln's Inn. In 1785 and eloped with Lady Mary Cornwallis, daughter of Charles Cornwallis, 1st Marquess Cornwallis, but her father soon endorsed the marriage.

Despite qualifying as a barrister, Singleton turned to the British Army, becoming an ensign in the 1st Foot Guards in 1782. He later served as a major in the Suffolk volunteer cavalry, and a cornet in the Middlesex yeomanry.

Singleton owed his career to the patronage of his father-in-law. After a period as a socialite, Cornwallis's influence secured Singleton's parliamentary seats and his appointment in 1795 as Storekeeper of Ordnance.

Parliament of Great Britain
Preceded by Viscount Brome; William Cornwallis	Member of Parliament for Eye; 1796–1799; With: William Cornwallis	Succeeded by James Cornwallis; William Cornwallis
Parliament of Ireland
Preceded by Robert Aldridge; Charles Osborne	Member of Parliament for Carysfort; 1799–1800; With: Charles Osborne	Parliament of Ireland abolished
Parliament of the United Kingdom
Preceded by Hon. Henry Wellesley; James Cornwallis	Member of Parliament for Eye; 1807–1820; With: Hon. Henry Wellesley to 1809; Charles Arbuthnot 1809–1812; Sir William Garrow 1812–1817; Sir Robert Gifford from 1817	Succeeded by Sir Miles Nightingall; Sir Robert Gifford
Political offices
Preceded by John Clater Aldridge	Storekeeper of the Ordnance; 1795–1806	Succeeded by John McMahon
Preceded by John McMahon	Storekeeper of the Ordnance; 1807–1829	Succeeded by Frederick Trench
