= Sir Matthew Deane, 4th Baronet =

Irish baronet and politician

Sir Matthew Deane, 4th Baronet (c. 1706 – 10 June 1751) was an Irish baronet and politician.

He was the eldest son of Sir Matthew Deane, 3rd Baronet and his wife Jane Sharpe, only daughter of Reverend William Sharpe. In 1747, he succeeded his father as baronet. Deane sat in the Irish House of Commons for Cork City from 1739 until his death in 1751.

He married Salisbury Davis, daughter of Robert Davis. They had three daughters, but no male heir and so Deane was succeeded in the baronetcy by his younger brother Robert.

Parliament of Ireland
Preceded by Hugh Dixon; Emanuel Pigott	Member of Parliament for Cork City; 1739 – 1751; With: Emanuel Pigott	Succeeded by Thomas Newenham; Emanuel Pigott
Baronetage of Ireland
Preceded by Matthew Deane	Baronet (of Muskerry); 1747 – 1751	Succeeded by Robert Deane
