= Thomas Carew (disambiguation) =

Thomas Carew (1595–1640) was an English poet.

Thomas Carew may also refer to:

- Thomas Carew (MP for Saltash) (1527–1565), English lawyer and politician
- Thomas Carew (died 1681) (1624–1681), English lawyer and politician
- Sir Thomas Carew, 1st Baronet (1632–1673), English politician, MP for Tiverton 1661–1674
- Thomas Carew (1718–1793), Irish politician, MP for Dungarvan 1761–1768
- Thomas A. Carew, sculptor in Boston, Massachusetts
- Thomas J. Carew, American neuroscientist
- Tom Carew, Sierra Leonean army officer
- Thomas Carew, real name of Thomas Carve (1590–c. 1672), Irish historian

== See also ==
- Carew (disambiguation)
