= John Allen, 3rd Viscount Allen =

Irish politician (1713–1745)

John Allen, 3rd Viscount Allen (11 June 1713 – 25 May 1745), was an Irish peer and politician.

He was the son of Joshua Allen, 2nd Viscount Allen. Allen was a member of parliament (MP) for Carysfort from 1733 until 1742, when he succeeded his father as Viscount Allen. In 1744, he was elected Grandmaster of the Grand Lodge of Ireland, a post he held for the next three years.

He never married and, on his death, his titles passed to his cousin.

Parliament of Ireland
Preceded by Richard Hull; John Sale	Member of Parliament for Carysfort; 1733–1742; With: Richard Hull	Succeeded by Richard Hull; Stephen Trotter
Masonic offices
Preceded by The Lord Southwell	Grandmaster of the Grand Lodge of Ireland; 1744–1747	Succeeded by Sir Marmaduke Wyvill, 6th Bt
Peerage of Ireland
Preceded by Joshua Allen	Viscount Allen; 1742–1745	Succeeded by John Allen
