= Robert Allen (Irish politician) =

Robert Allen was an Irish politician.

Allen was educated at Trinity College, Dublin. From 1713 to 1714, he was MP for Carysfort in County Wicklow.
