= Marcus Beresford (Dungarvan MP) =

Irish politician

Marcus Beresford (14 February 1764 – 16 November 1797) was an Irish politician.

== Background ==
A member of the Beresford family headed by the Marquess of Waterford, he was the eldest son of John Beresford. George Beresford and John Claudius Beresford were his younger brothers. He was educated at Trinity College, Dublin.

== Political career ==
Beresford returned to the Irish House of Commons for Dungarvan in 1783 and held this position until his death fourteen years later.

== Family ==
Beresford married Frances Arabella, daughter of Joseph Leeson, 1st Earl of Milltown, in 1791. They had three children:

- Lt John Theophilus Beresford (1792 – 19 January 1812), mortally wounded by the explosion of a magazine at the Siege of Ciudad Rodrigo
- Elizabeth Beresford (1794-7 December 1856), married Felix Calvert Ladbroke (1802-1869) the son of Felix Ladbroke and Mary Ann Shubrick.
- William Beresford (1797–1883) was a Conservative politician and government minister.

He died in November 1797 at the age of 33. His wife lived over 40 years longer than him and died in May 1840.

Parliament of Ireland
Preceded by Sir William Osborne, Bt; Godfrey Greene	Member of Parliament for Dungarvan; 1783–1797; With: Godfrey Greene 1783–1790; Chambre Ponsonby 1790–1797	Succeeded by Chambré Ponsonby; John Ponsonby
