= John Proby Osborne =

Irish politician

John Proby Osborne, MP (1755 – December 1787) was an Irish politician.

He was the son of Sir William Osborne, 8th Baronet and wife Elizabeth Christmas. He was a practising barrister and sat as a Member of Parliament in the Irish House of Commons for Carysfort between 1783 and 1788.

Osborne died unmarried and childless.

== Sources ==
- G.E. Cokayne; with Vicary Gibbs, H.A. Doubleday, Geoffrey H. White, Duncan Warrand and Lord Howard de Walden, editors, The Complete Peerage of England, Scotland, Ireland, Great Britain and the United Kingdom, Extant, Extinct or Dormant, new ed., 13 volumes in 14 (1910–1959; reprint in 6 volumes, Gloucester, U.K.: Alan Sutton Publishing, 2000), volume III, page 71.
- Charles Mosley, editor, Burke's Peerage, Baronetage & Knightage, 107th edition, 3 volumes (Wilmington, Delaware, U.S.A.: Burke's Peerage (Genealogical Books) Ltd, 2003), volume 2, page 3031.

Parliament of Ireland
| Preceded by Sir William Osborne, Bt; Thomas Osborne | Member of Parliament for Carysfort; 1783–1788; With: Sir Thomas Osborne, Bt | Succeeded by Alleyne FitzHerbert; Sir Thomas Osborne, Bt |
