= Somersal Herbert =

Hamlet in Derbyshire, England

Coordinates: 52.914°N 1.797°W

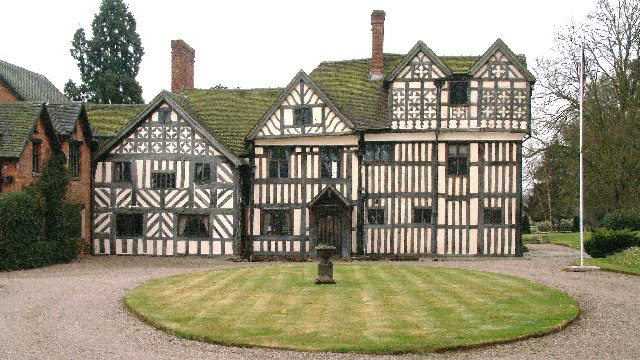
- Somersal Herbert Hall

- Location within Derbyshire
- OS grid reference: SK137351
- District: Derbyshire Dales
- Shire county: Derbyshire
- Region: East Midlands
- Country: England
- Sovereign state: United Kingdom
- Post town: ASHBOURNE
- Postcode district: DE6
- Police: Derbyshire
- Fire: Derbyshire
- Ambulance: East Midlands

Somersal Herbert is a hamlet and civil parish in Derbyshire, England, 2 miles northeast of Doveridge. It contains Somersal Herbert Hall. Nearby hamlets include Hill Somersal and Potter Somersal. The Methodist church in the area is dedicated to St. Peter and has a Norman font dating to the 12th century.

== History ==
At the time of the Domesday Survey, two manors were held in Somersal, Alcher and Alrie under Henry de Ferrers. The Fitz-Herberts held one of the manors in the 13th century and retained it for centuries and owned Somersal Herbert Hall. In 1803 Richard Fitz-Herbert, the last male heir, passed the manor to his sister Frances, who passes it to her nephew Reverend Roger Jacson upon her death.

In 1894, Somersal Herbert merged with Sudbury to form a united parish, which had two rural district councillors and six parish councillors.

Somersal Herbert Conservation Area of 35 buildings, with 12 listed buildings, was established in December 1979 and a Conservation Area Character Appraisal was given the green light in August 2012. The protected area measures 91.5 hectares.

== Geography ==
Brocksford Brook flows to the west of the hamlet and passes under Doveridge Bypass. The hamlet of Hill Somersal is about 0.6 miles (0.97 km) to the southeast and the hamlet of Potter Somersal is about 0.5 miles (0.80 km) to the northeast.

== Landmarks ==
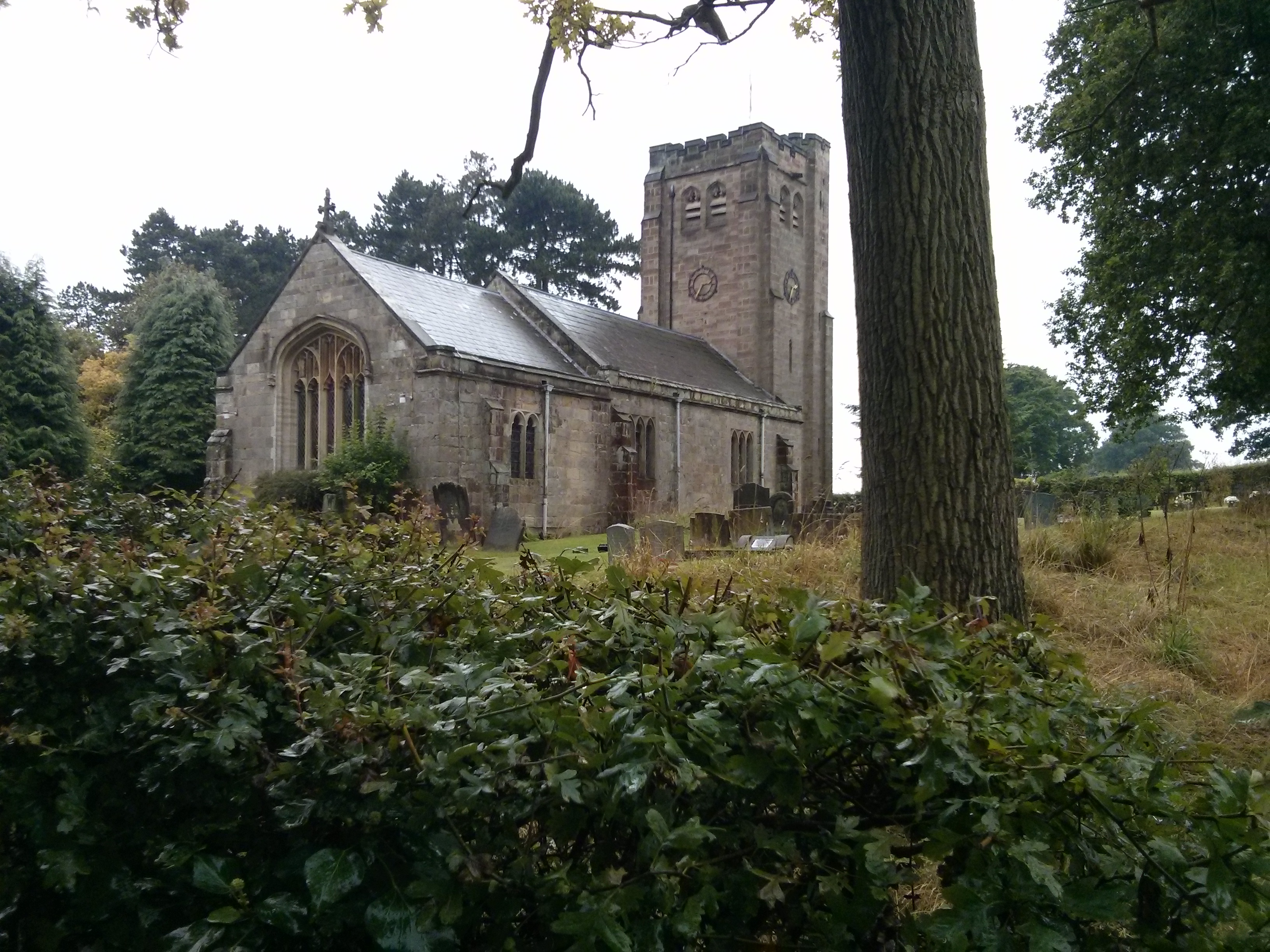
St. Peter's Church, Somersal Herbert

Somersal Herbert Hall was built c.1564, incorporating an earlier building from c.1500, and is a Grade I listed building. The west end of the hall was built in 1712 and there were further additions and alterations in 1840 and 1873. Highfield House is to the east and Grove Cottage and Marjorie Cottage lie on Grove Lane to the south.

The Anglican church in the area is dedicated to St. Peter & St Blaise and has a Norman font dating to the 12th century. It was rebuilt, except for the porch, in 1873 in the Perpendicular style. The earlier Fitz-Herberts were buried at the church. There is a small cemetery near Hill Farm at Hill Somersal.

== See also ==
- Listed buildings in Somersal Herbert
