= Baron Muskerry =

Title in the Peerage of Ireland

Baron Muskerry is a title in the Peerage of Ireland. It was created in 1781 for Sir Robert Deane, 6th Baronet. He had previously represented County Cork in the Irish House of Commons.

His great-grandson, the fourth Baron, sat in the House of Lords as an Irish representative peer from 1892 to 1929. On the death in 1954 of his younger son, the sixth Baron, this line of the family failed. The late Baron was succeeded by his first cousin once removed, the seventh Baron. He was the son of the Hon. Hastings Fitzmaurice Deane, third son of the third Baron. As of 2014 the titles are held by his grandson, the ninth Baron, who succeeded his father in 1988. Lord Muskerry lives in South Africa.

The Deane Baronetcy, of Muskerry in the County of Cork, was created in the Baronetage of Ireland in 1710 for the first Baron's great-great-grandfather Matthew Deane. His grandson, the third Baronet, sat as a Member of the Irish House of Commons for County Cork. He was succeeded by his eldest son, the fourth Baronet. He represented Cork City in the Irish Parliament.

On his death the title passed to his younger brother, the fifth Baronet. He represented Tallaght in the Irish House of Commons and was admitted to the Irish Privy Council in 1768. He was succeeded by his son, the aforementioned sixth Baronet, who was elevated to the peerage in 1781.

The family seat is Springfield Castle, near Drumcolliher, County Limerick.

Escutcheon of the Barons Muskerry

== Deane baronets, of Muskerry (1710) ==
- Sir Matthew Deane, 1st Baronet (c. 1626–1711)
- Sir Robert Deane, 2nd Baronet (died 1712)
- Sir Matthew Deane, 3rd Baronet (died 1747)
- Sir Matthew Deane, 4th Baronet (c. 1706–1751)
- Sir Robert Deane, 5th Baronet (c. 1707–1770)
- Sir Robert Tilson Deane, 6th Baronet (1745–1818) (created Baron Muskerry in 1781)

== Barons Muskerry (1781) ==
- Robert Tilson Deane, 1st Baron Muskerry (1745–1818)
- John Thomas Fitzmaurice Deane, 2nd Baron Muskerry (1777–1824)
- Matthew Fitzmaurice Deane, 3rd Baron Muskerry (1795–1868)
- Hamilton Matthew Tilson Fitzmaurice Deane-Morgan, 4th Baron Muskerry (1854–1929)
- Robert Matthew Fitzmaurice Deane-Morgan, 5th Baron Muskerry (1874–1952)
- Matthew Chichester Cecil Fitzmaurice Deane-Morgan, 6th Baron Muskerry (1875–1954)
- Matthew Fitzmaurice Tilson Deane, 7th Baron Muskerry (1874–1966)
- Hastings Fitzmaurice Tilson Deane, 8th Baron Muskerry (1907–1988)
- Robert Fitzmaurice Deane, 9th Baron Muskerry (born 1948)

The heir apparent and sole heir to the titles is the present holder's only son, Hon. Jonathan Fitzmaurice Deane (born 1986).
