= Springfield Castle =

Ruined fortification in County Limerick, Ireland

Coordinates: 52.3518°N 8.9555°W

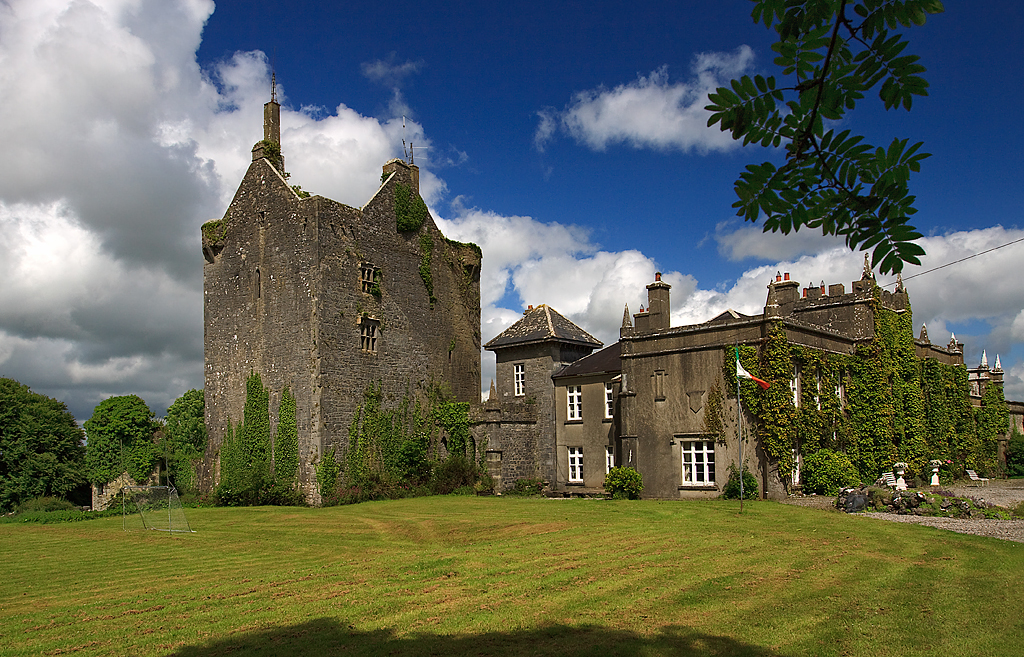
Springfield Castle, Broadford, County Limerick

Springfield Castle, Broadford, is situated in the west part of County Limerick, Ireland, close to the town of Newcastlewest.

The castle is a group of buildings around a courtyard, comprising two stone keeps, or towers; one 15th-century, one 18th-century, a range of workshops and stables and the modernised remains of an 18th-century servants' wing.

In 1280 the Norman Fitzgerald family settled at the site, then known as Gort na Tiobrad. The Fitzgeralds married into the local ruling class, the Gaelic O'Colleains and assumed the title Lords of Claonghlais. During the 15th century their descendants built a stone keep. Recently restored the keep contains a fine example of a mural staircase (stone steps built within the thickness of the external wall).

During the mid-17th century the Fitzgeralds gave shelter and patronage to the Irish poet Dáibhí Ó Bruadair (1625–1698), who wrote an elegy about the family, as well as recording their lives and exploits.

As the family prospered, a second keep was built during the 18th century to garrison soldiers.

In 1691, following the confiscation of their lands by the King of England, the Fitzgeralds left Springfield and were forced to flee to France. The property was bought by William Fitzmaurice, a younger son of the 20th Lord Kerry. His son, John Fitzmaurice, built a large three-storey mansion in Early Georgian style, adjacent to the 13th-century keep, which survived until the Irish Republican Army burnt it down in 1921.

In 1780 Ann Fitzmaurice, sole heiress, married Sir Robert Deane, 1st Baron Muskerry. Following the fire in 1921, Sir Robert Deane, 5th Baron Muskerry rebuilt the Georgian mansion's servants wing and renovated parts of the other buildings. It is these parts of the complex, with 200 acres (81 ha) of land and several lodges, which are today inhabited by his descendants. The castle is owned by Robert Deane, 9th Baron Muskerry.
