= Thomas Christmas =

18th Century Irish MP

Thomas Christmas was an Irish politician.

Christmas was born in Waterford, son of Richard Christmas, High Sheriff of Waterford in 1686, and Susanna Aland, daughter of Henry Aland, and was educated at Trinity College, Dublin. He was MP for the Irish constituency of Waterford City from 1713 to 1747. Like his father and his grandfather, the elder Thomas Christmas, he was High Sheriff of Waterford (1715). The Christmas family were dominant in Waterford politics from the late seventeenth century up to the 1860s.

He married Elizabeth Marshall, daughter of John Marshall of Clonmel (died 1717), and sister of Robert Marshall, judge of the Court of Common Pleas (Ireland); Robert is best remembered as the executor and co-legatee of Esther Vanhomrigh, the beloved "Vanessa" of Jonathan Swift. Thomas and Elizabeth had four children, including Thomas junior and William, who both followed their father into Parliament, and Elizabeth, who married Sir William Osborne, 8th Baronet. Their daughter Ada married her cousin Thomas Christmas and had issue including William Christmas. Thomas junior married Lady Catherine Beresford, daughter of Marcus Beresford, 1st Earl of Tyrone. After his early death, Catherine remarried Theophilus Jones and had three sons.

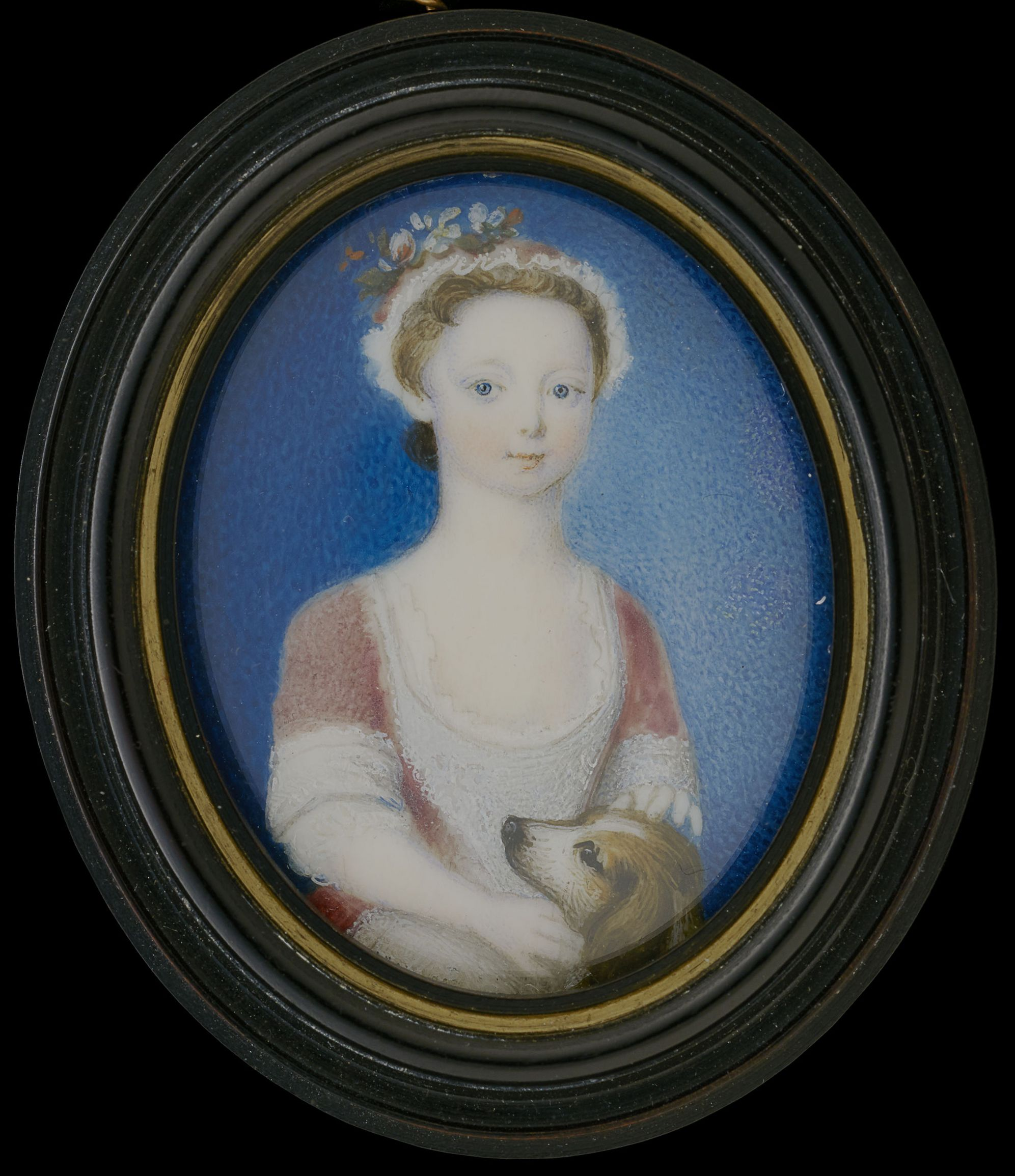
Lady Catherine Beresford, Christmas's daughter-in-law
