= James Barry (Irish MP, 1659–1717) =

Irish politician, died 1717

James Barry (1659–1717) was an Irish politician.

Barry was returned for Rathcormack to the Irish House of Commons from 1689 until 1703, when he was also elected for Dungarvan. He chose to sit for latter and represented it until 1713. Subsequently, he became again Member of Parliament (MP) for Rathcormack. In 1715, Barry stood a second time for Dungarvan, a seat he finally held until his death two years later.

Parliament of Ireland
Unknown	Member of Parliament for Rathcormack; 1689–1703; With: Edward Powel 1689; Robert Foulke 1692–1703; Daniel Gahan 1703	Succeeded by Daniel Gahan; John Silver
Preceded by Charles Bourchier; William Buckner	Member of Parliament for Dungarvan; 1703–1713; With: Roger Power 1703–1709; Henry Pyne 1709–1713	Succeeded by James Barry; Robert Carew
Preceded by Daniel Gahan; John Silver	Member of Parliament for Rathcormack; 1713–1715; With: Edward Corker 1713–1715; Jephson Busteed 1715	Succeeded by Jephson Busteed; James Tynte
Preceded by James Barry; Robert Carew	Member of Parliament for Dungarvan; 1715–1717; With: Robert Carew	Succeeded by Redmond Barry; Robert Carew
