= Joseph Leeson =

Joseph Leeson may refer to:

- Joseph Leeson, 1st Earl of Milltown (1701–1783), Irish peer
- Joseph Leeson, 2nd Earl of Milltown (1730–1801), Irish peer, son of the above
- Joseph Leeson, 4th Earl of Milltown (1799–1866), Irish peer
- Joseph Leeson, 5th Earl of Milltown (1829–1871), Irish peer
- Joseph F. Leeson Jr. (born 1955), U.S. District Judge
