= James Barry (Irish MP, 1689–1743) =

Irish politician, died 1743

James Barry (1689–1743) was an Irish politician.

He was a Member of Parliament (MP) for Dungarvan in the Irish House of Commons from 1713 to 1715 and again from 1721 to 1727. Between 1727 and 1743, he presented Rathcormack.

Parliament of Ireland
Preceded by James Barry; Henry Pyne	Member of Parliament for Dungarvan; 1713–1715; With: Robert Carew	Succeeded by James Barry; Robert Carew
Preceded by Redmond Barry; Robert Carew	Member of Parliament for Dungarvan; 1721–1727; With: Redmond Barry	Succeeded by Benjamin Parry; Thomas Carter
Preceded by Jephson Busteed; James Tynte	Member of Parliament for Rathcormack; 1727–1743; With: Redmond Barry 1727–1728; William FitzHerbert 1728–1743; Joseph Leeson 1743	Succeeded by Brettridge Badham; Joseph Leeson
