= Barker baronets of Bocking Hall (1676) =

Escutcheon of the Barker baronets of Bocking Hall

The Barker baronetcy, of Bocking Hall in the County of Essex, was created in the Baronetage of England on 29 March 1676 for William Barker. He married that year a daughter of Jerome Alexander, and later with his second wife emigrated to Ireland.

The title became extinct on the death of the 4th Baronet in 1818, leaving no heir. He had built Kilcooly Abbey, County Tipperary, near the old abbey that had been the family seat. On his death it passed to his nephew Chambré Brabazon Ponsonby-Barker.

== Barker baronets, of Bocking Hall (1676) ==
- Sir William Barker, 1st Baronet (c. 1652–c. 1719)
- Sir William Barker, 2nd Baronet (c. 1677–1746)
- Sir William Barker, 3rd Baronet (1704–1770)
- Sir William Barker, 4th Baronet (died 1818)
