= Matthew Hore =

Colonel Matthew Hore (died 1696) was an Irish Confederate and Jacobite politician and soldier.

Hore was the son of John Hore of Shandon, County Waterford and Mary Wadding. In 1642 he attended the Confederate General Assembly in Kilkenny. He fought for the Confederates during the Irish Confederate Wars. Following the Cromwellian Conquest of Ireland, he was deprived of his estates under the Act for the Settlement of Ireland 1652. After the Stuart Restoration, Hore was restored to his estates, amounting to 4,287 acres of land, by the Act of Settlement 1662. He was made a justice of the peace for County Waterford in 1671.

During the Williamite War in Ireland, Hore was appointed a captain, and later a lieutenant colonel, in Richard Grace's regiment of infantry. In 1689, he was elected as a Member of Parliament for County Waterford in the short-lived Patriot Parliament summoned by James II of England in Dublin. In 1691 he was attainted for treason. He died in 1696. Hore was the father of the Dungarvan Jacobite politicians, John Hore and Martin Hore.

Parliament of Ireland
Preceded by James Annesley; Richard Power	Member of Parliament for County Waterford; 1689; With: John Warren	Succeeded by Edward FitzGerald-Villiers; Joseph Ivey
