= Edward Leeson, 6th Earl of Milltown =

Anglo-Irish peer

The Right Honourable The Earl of Milltown KP PC (Ire)
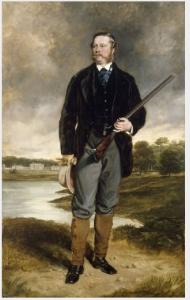

Edward Nugent Leeson, 6th Earl of Milltown, KP PC (Ire) (9 October 1835 – 30 May 1890), was an Irish peer.

He was the second son of Joseph Leeson, 4th Earl of Milltown and his wife Barbara, dowager Lady Caste Coote, daughter of Sir Joshua Colles Meredyth, 8th Baronet.

== Life ==
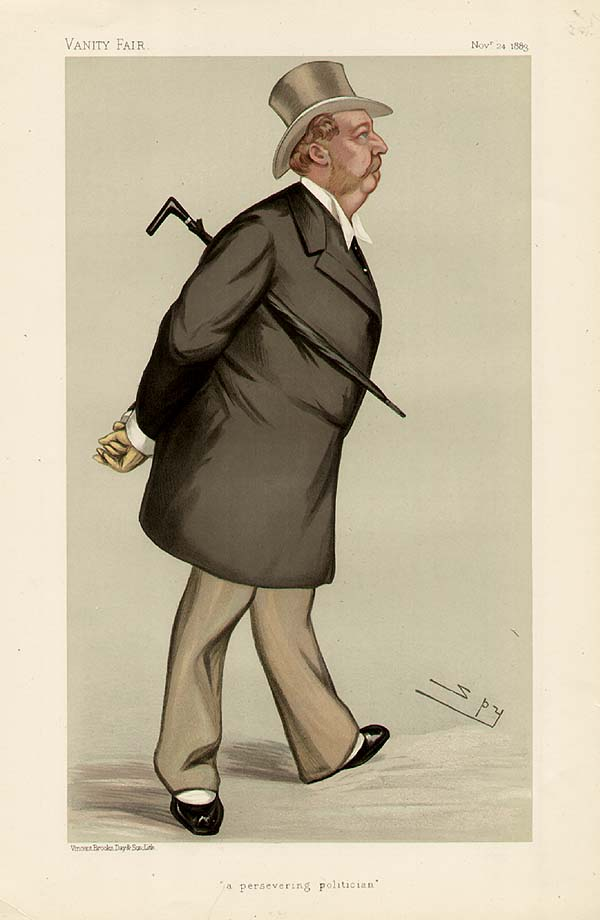
"A persevering politician" The Earl of Milltown as caricatured by Spy (Leslie Ward) in Vanity Fair, November 1883

Educated at Trinity College, Dublin, he was called to the Bar at the Inner Temple in 1862. On the death of his elder brother Joseph Leeson, 5th Earl of Milltown in 1871, he succeeded to his family's peerage then being elected on 23 August 1881 as an Irish representative peer, allowing him to sit in the House of Lords.

Lord Lieutenant of Wicklow from 14 June 1887, in 1889 Lord Milltown became an Honorary Commissioner in lunacy, and was also appointed a Knight of St. Patrick on 7 February 1890, shortly before his death.

He married, in 1871, Lady Geraldine Stanhope, daughter of the Leicester Stanhope, 5th Earl of Harrington, but had no issue.

On his death, the title passed to his brother Henry Leeson who died a year later when the title fell dormant (pending any claim by Robert Leeson's descendants).

== See also ==
- Earl of Milltown
- Irish House of Lords

Political offices
Preceded by The Earl of Wicklow	Representative peer for Ireland; 1881–1890	Succeeded by The Earl of Mayo
Honorary titles
Preceded by The Earl of Meath	Lord Lieutenant of Wicklow; 1887–1890	Succeeded by The Earl of Carysfort
Peerage of Ireland
Preceded by Joseph Leeson	Earl of Milltown; 1871–1890	Succeeded by Henry Leeson
