= Chambré Brabazon Ponsonby-Barker =

Irish Member of Parliament

Chambré Brabazon Ponsonby-Barker (12 June 1762 – 13 December 1834) was an Irish Member of Parliament.

He was born Chambré Brabazon Ponsonby, son of Chambré Brabazon Ponsonby by his third wife Mary, daughter of Sir William Barker, 3rd Baronet. He adopted the surname of Barker on inheriting Kilcooly Abbey from his uncle Sir William Barker, 4th Baronet in 1818.

His elder half sister, daughter of Louisa, daughter of Henry Lyons of Belmont, his father's second wife, was Sarah Ponsonby, (1755–1831), the younger of the two Ladies of Llangollen.

Ponsonby-Barker represented Dungarvan in the Irish House of Commons from 1790 to 1798.

He was married on 4 June 1791 to Lady Henrietta Taylour, daughter of Thomas Taylour, 1st Earl of Bective. They had three sons and a daughter, Catherine Jane, who married Edward Michael Conolly.
