= Daniel Gahan =

Anglo-Irish politician (1671–1713)

Sir Daniel Gahan (1671–1713) was an Anglo-Irish politician.

Gahan was the son of Daniel Gahan, who had been granted 1,000 acres of land in Slievardagh in 1666. Gahan was the Member of Parliament for Portarlington in the Irish House of Commons between 1692 and 1693. He later represented Rathcormack from 1703 until his death in 1713. He was made a Knight Bachelor in 1705.

Parliament of Ireland
| Preceded by Patriot Parliament; Sir Henry Bond, Bt; Thomas Hacket | Member of Parliament for Portarlington; 1692–1693; With: Edward Riggs | Succeeded by Joseph Williamson; Richard Warburton |
| Preceded by James Barry; Robert Foulke | Member of Parliament for Rathcormack; 1703–1713; With: James Barry (1703); John Silver (1703–1713) | Succeeded by James Barry; Edward Corker |
