= Peg Plunkett =

Leeson [née Plunkett], Margaret (1727–1797), courtesan and writer

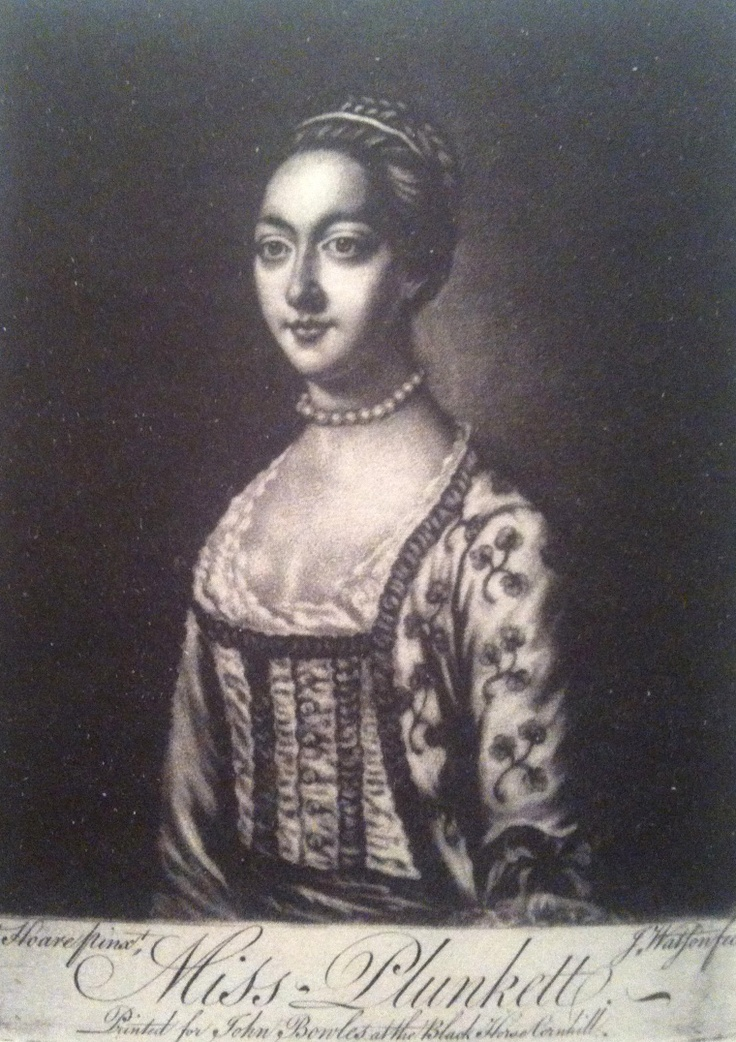
- Miss Plunkett
- Born: c. 1727; Westmeath, Ireland
- Died: 1797 (aged 70)
- Other names: Margaret Leeson
- Known for: keeping a brothel

Peg Plunkett (c. 1727 – 1797) was an Irish brothel keeper in Dublin who wrote her memoirs in three volumes.

== Life ==
Margaret Plunkett was born in the Irish county of Westmeath around 1727. (Her date of birth is not accepted by all who have written about her: Francis Leeson believed she was born about 1736 and Julie Peakman, the author of Peg Plunkett: memoirs of a whore, prefers a birth date of about 1742.) She was one of eight of her mother's 22 children who survived childhood. Because of her mother's death and brother's abuse she moved to Dublin. In Dublin the teenage Plunkett became pregnant and she was kept by the child's father until the child died. This was the first of six of her children who died. At this point she lost everything and took again to being unmarried and relying on the support of men. Amongst these was a Mr Leeson whom Plunkett did not marry but she did adopt his surname. Plunkett never revealed the identity of this man but he is believed to have been Joseph Leeson, 2nd Earl of Milltown.

Plunkett became head of her own household when she started her first brothel with a friend, Sally Hayes, in Drogheda Street in Dublin. Plunkett was successful in court against Richard Crosbie, the leader of a notorious gang known as the Pinking Dindies. This group of upper-class youths and failed students carried swords with which they used to mug the unfortunate. They were known for taking the "booty" from prostitutes and brothels and they continued in this practice, despite the law, for many years. Crosbie was sent to jail for an attack on Plunkett that ended a pregnancy and caused another of her children to die; it was said that Crosbie could have faced a murder charge.

The business had other addresses but finally occupied premises in Pitt Street (now Balfe Street, near Grafton Street). Plunkett took her exploiters to the courts on more than one occasion and she was said to enjoy local support because her business attracted customers to other nearby businesses.

Plunkett retired after thirty years to Blackrock. She was said to have had a secret pension from the Irish government at one point.

As her income reduced she began to write her memoirs. It is presumed that the motive was to profit by threatening to name her former lovers. She died aged 70 in 1797 and her obituary was published in the Dublin Evening Post on 17 May.

== Legacy ==
Besides her three-volume autobiography there is a contemporary biography of her and a radio documentary. Her original memoirs have also been re-published in edited form.
