= John Hore (MP for Dungarvan) =

Irish Jacobite politician (17th century)

John Hore (fl.1642–1691) was an Irish Jacobite politician.

Hore was the elder son of Matthew Hore. In 1689 he was appointed High Sheriff of County Waterford. The same year, he was elected as a Member of Parliament for Dungarvan in the Patriot Parliament summoned by James II of England. He was attainted in 1691 for his support for Jacobism.

He married Catherine Bourke, daughter of Sir John Bourke of Derrymaclachtney and granddaughter of Richard Burke, 6th Earl of Clanricarde.

Parliament of Ireland
Preceded by John Fitzgerald; Sir Allen Broderick	Member of Parliament for Dungarvan; 1689; With: Martin Hore	Succeeded by Charles Bourchier; William Buckner
