= Rory O'Tunny =

Irish sculptor

- Born: Callan, County Kilkenny, Ireland
- Style: Gothic
- Patrons: Butler family

Rory O'Tunny (fl. c. 1520 – 1542; Irish: Ruaidrí Ó Tonnaigh, Latin: Roricus Otunne; other spellings include Ruoricus, Otyuny, Otwyne, Otuyne, Otyyne) was an Irish sculptor.

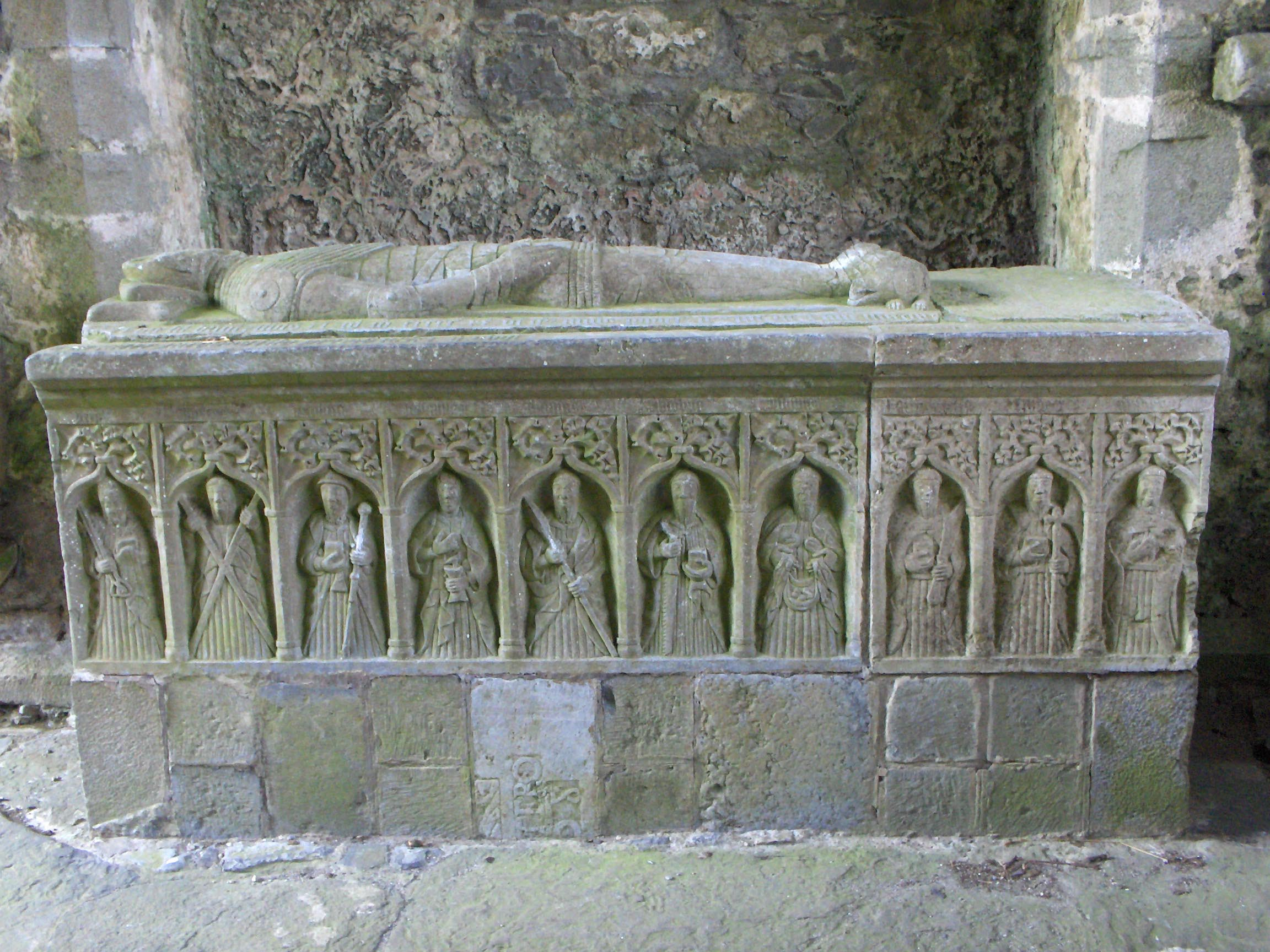
Tomb of the knight Piers Fitz Oge Butler sculpted by O'Tunny

Rory O'Tunny was born into a family of sculptors, said to have originated in Callan, County Kilkenny. According to his own signature in Kilcooly Abbey, his father's name was Patrick. Rory was primarily a sculptor of tombs, eight of which he signed with his full name. Among his more prominent works are three tombs in Kilcooly Abbey, the resting place of Sir John Grace and his wife, Honora Brenach, in the North aisle of St. Canice' Cathedral, County Kilkenny, and the tombs of Robert Walsh and his wife, Katherine Poer (Power), at Jerpoint Abbey.

Several of the chest tombs at St. Canice's Cathedral which had been taken apart and scattered in the graveyard by Cromwellian forces and re-assembled in the 19th century have been partially identified as O'Tunny's work by John Hunt.

He is also believed to have carved the Trinity Stone (Throne of Grace) once housed in St. Mary's Church, Callan, now in the Catholic Church in Callan.

== Gallery ==
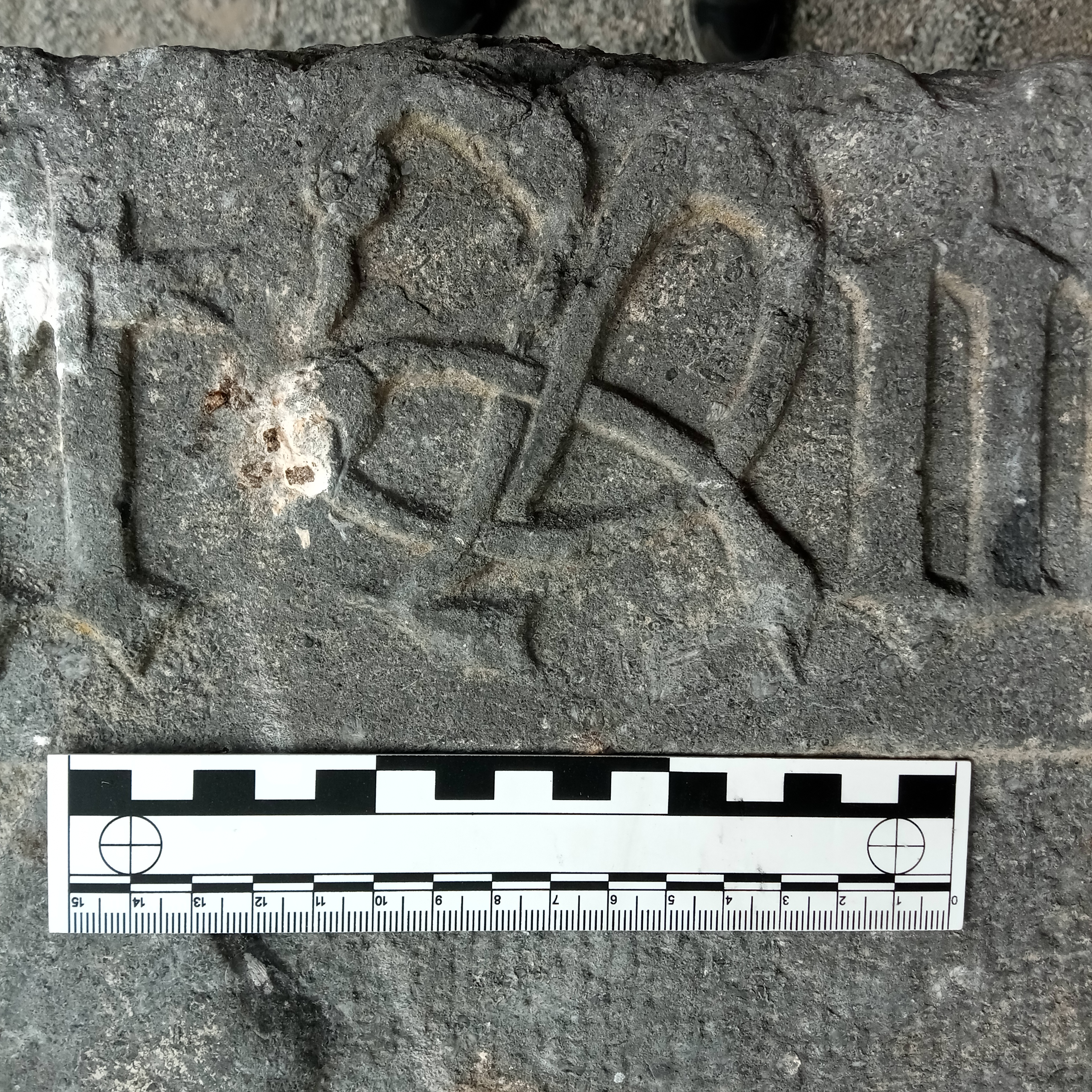
Rory O'Tunny's signature in Jerpoint Abbey (upside down)

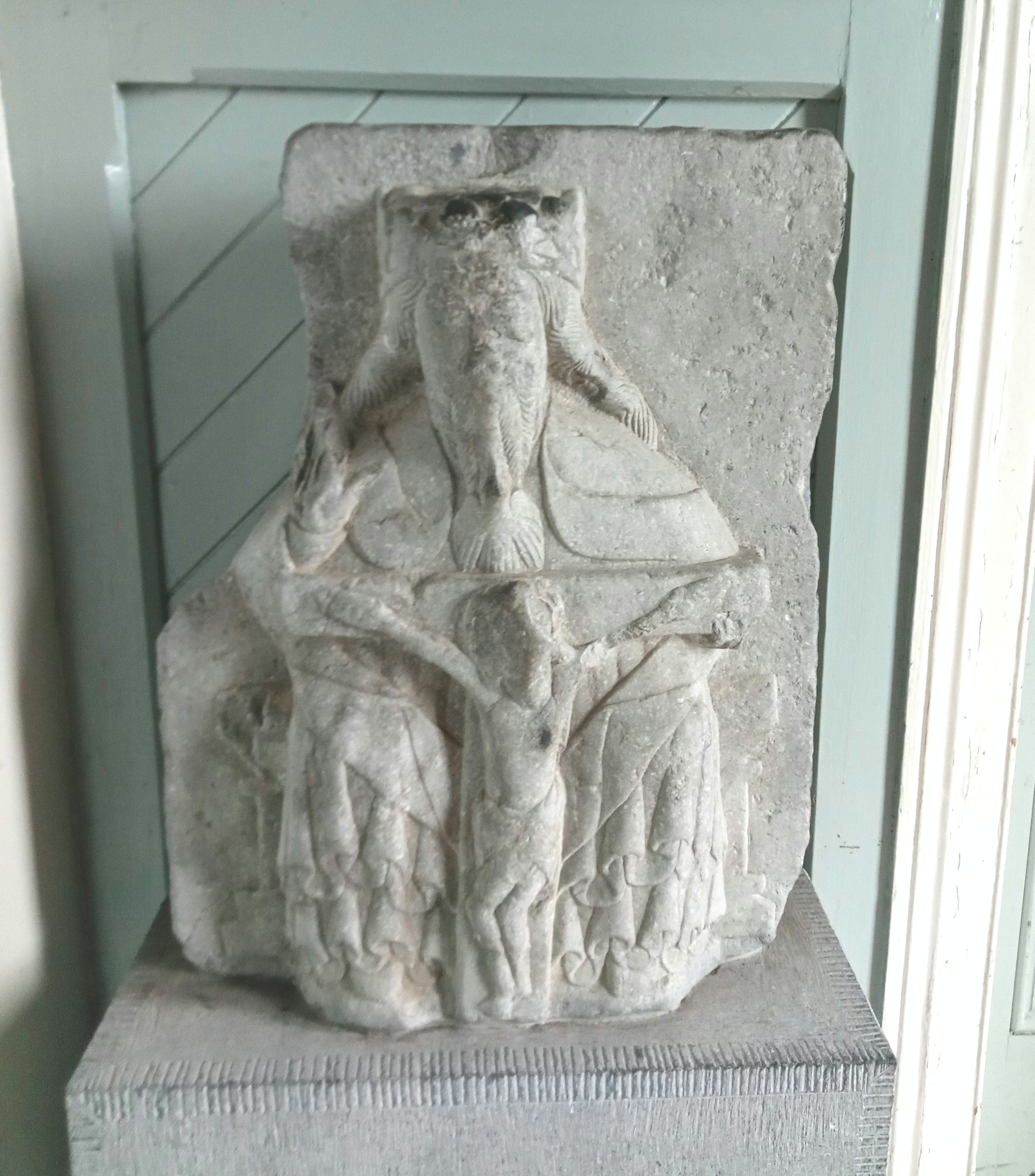
Throne of Mercy or Trinity Stone in Callan

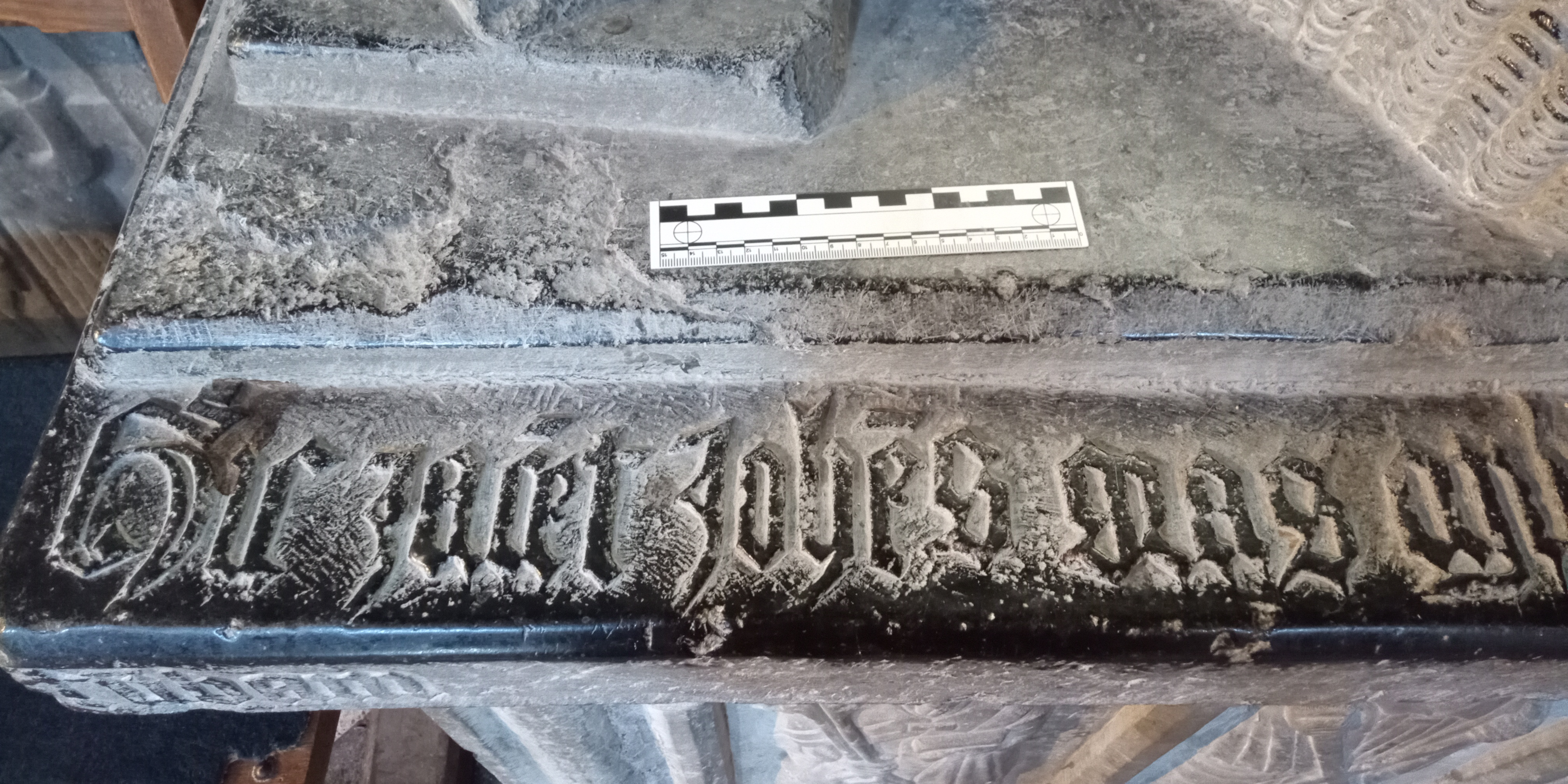
Inscription on grave of John Grace at Saint Canice's Cathedral

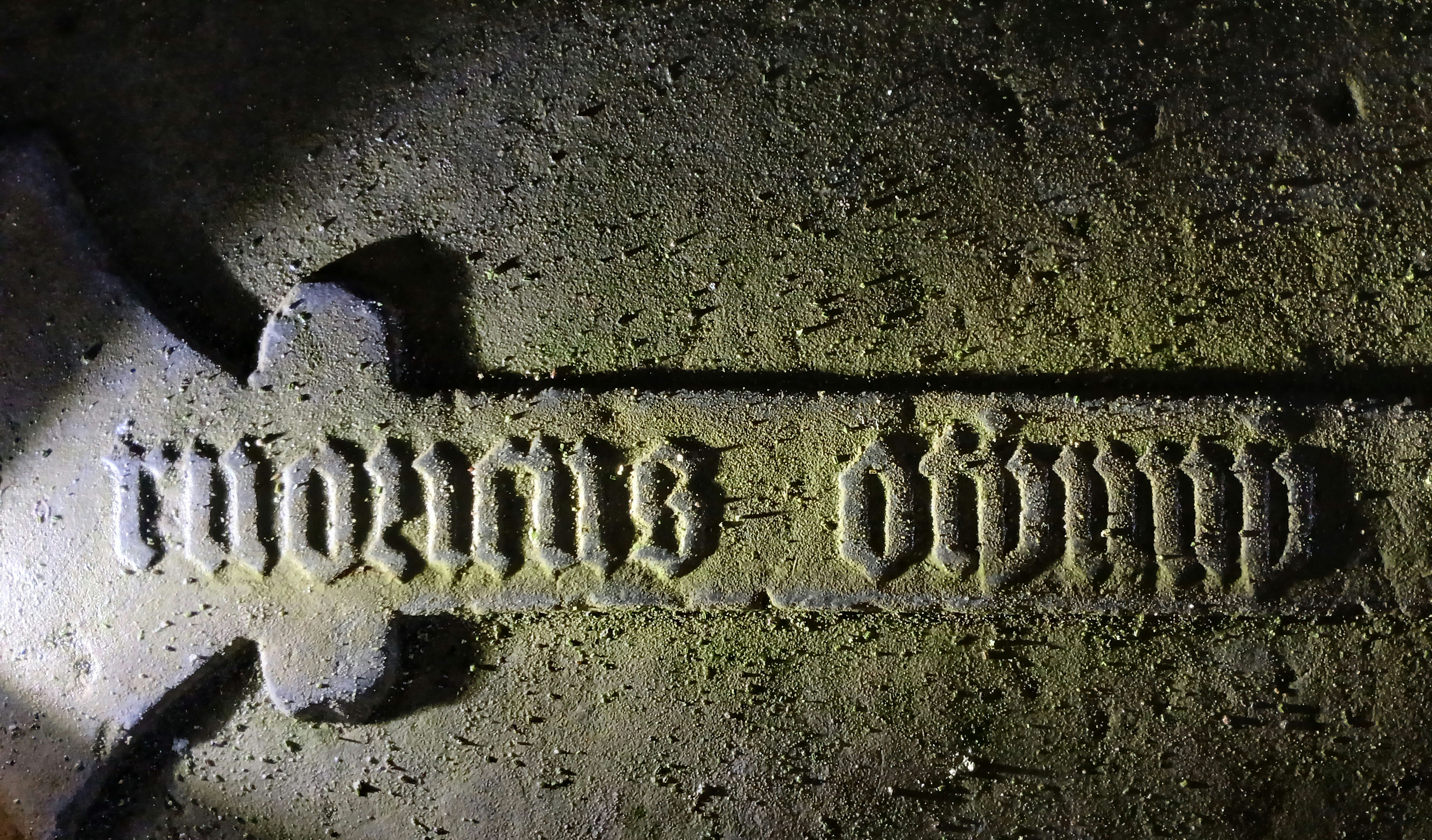
O'Tunny signature on a tomb at Kilcooley Abbey

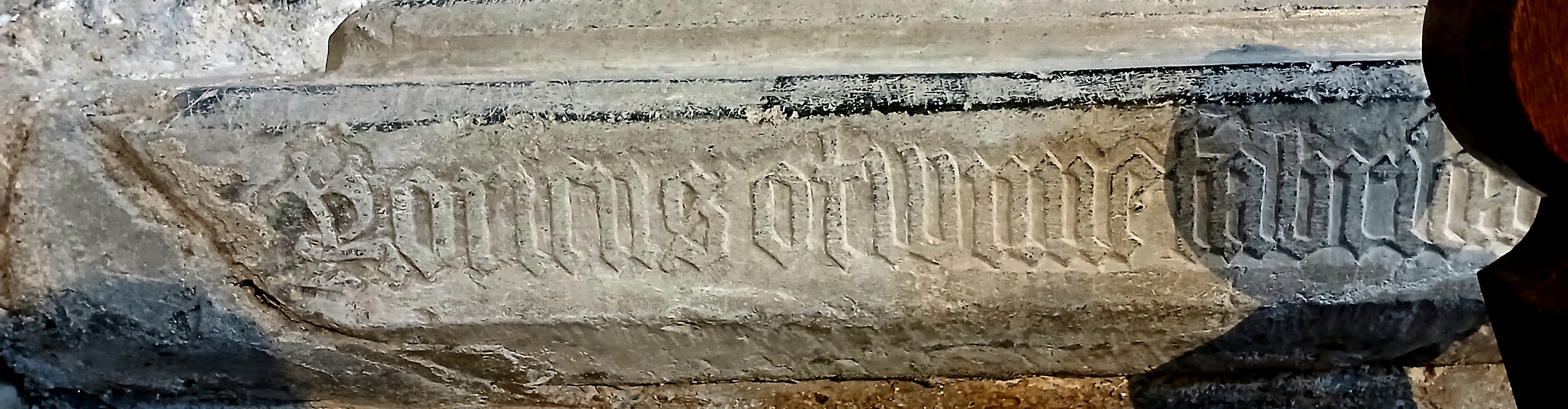
Signature on the tomb of John Grace at St Canice's Cathedral
