= Charles Bourchier =

Irish soldier and politician

Member of Parliament for Dungarvan
- In office 1692–1699

Member of Parliament for Armagh Borough
- In office 1715–1716

Personal details
- Born: 1665
- Died: 1716
- Spouse: Barbara Harrison
- Children: Richard Bourchier
- Occupation: Soldier, Politician

Charles Bourchier (1665–1716) was a soldier and politician who sat in the Irish House of Commons at various times between 1692 and 1716.

Bourchier was a gentleman of the regiment of horse commanded by Lord Windsor. He married Barbara Harrison, daughter of Richard Harrison of Balls, Hertfordshire and MP for Lancaster. He was buried at the parish church of Clontarf, Dublin At the 1692 Irish election he was elected Member of Parliament for Dungarvan and was re-elected for the parliament from 1695 to 1699. In 1715 he was elected MP for Armagh Boroughs and held the seat until his death.

Bourchier died on 18 May 1716 aged 52. His son Richard Bourchier became Governor of Bombay.

Parliament of Ireland
Preceded by John Hore; Martin Hore	Member of Parliament for Dungarvan; 1692–1699; With: William Buckner	Succeeded by James Barry; Roger Power
Preceded by Epaphroditus Marsh; Samuel Dopping	Member of Parliament for Armagh Borough; 1715–1716; With: Silvester Crosse	Succeeded by Silvester Crosse; John Eyre
