= Henry Pyne (MP for Dungarvan) =

Politician in Ireland (1688–1713)

Henry Pyne (before May 1688 – 28 February 1713) was a politician in Ireland.

He was a Member of the Parliament of Ireland for Dungarvan from 1709 to 1713.

Parliament of Ireland
Preceded by James Barry (1659–1717); Roger Power	Member of Parliament for Dungarvan; 1709–1713; With: James Barry (1659–1717)	Succeeded by James Barry (1689–1743); Robert Carew
