= Barker baronets =

Set index for Barker baronets

There have been five baronetcies created for persons with the surname Barker, three in the Baronetage of England, one in the Baronetage of Great Britain and one in the Baronetage of the United Kingdom. All five creations are extinct.

- Barker baronets of Grimston Hall (1622)
- Barker baronets of Hambleton (1665)
- Barker baronets of Bocking Hall (1676)
- Barker baronets of Bushbridge (1781): see Sir Robert Barker, 1st Baronet (1732–1789)
- Barker baronets of Bishop's Stortford (1908): see Sir John Barker, 1st Baronet (1840–1914)

== See also ==
- Barker-Mill baronets
