= Barker baronets of Grimston Hall (1622) =

Escutcheon of the Barker baronets of Grimston Hall

The Barker baronetcy, of Grimston Hall in the County of Suffolk, was created in the Baronetage of England on 17 March 1622 for John Barker, son of Robert Barker, Member of Parliament for Ipswich.

The 4th Baronet sat as Member of Parliament for Ipswich. The 5th Baronet represented Ipswich, Thetford and Suffolk in Parliament. The title became extinct on the death of the 7th Baronet in 1766, leaving no issue.

== Barker baronets, of Grimston Hall (1622) ==
- Sir John Barker, 1st Baronet (died 1652)
- Sir John Barker, 2nd Baronet (died 1664)
- Sir Jeremy Barker, 3rd Baronet (died 1665)
- Sir John Barker, 4th Baronet (1655–1696)
- Sir William Barker, 5th Baronet (1685–1731)
- Sir John Barker, 6th Baronet (1724–1757) of Sproughton
- Sir John Fytche Barker, 7th Baronet (1741–1766)
