= Martin Hore =

Martin Hore (fl.1642–1691) was an Irish Jacobite politician.

Hore was the younger son of Matthew Hore. In 1685, on the accession of James II of England, Hore was granted the manor of Rosmire, totalling 3,987 acres. In 1689, he was elected as a Member of Parliament for Dungarvan in the Patriot Parliament. He was attainted in 1691.

Parliament of Ireland
Preceded by John Fitzgerald; Sir Allen Broderick	Member of Parliament for Dungarvan; 1689; With: John Hore	Succeeded by Charles Bourchier; William Buckner
