= William Buckner (Irish MP) =

Anglo-Irish politician

William Buckner or Bucknor (?–1700) was a minor Anglo-Irish politician of the late 17th century.

Buckner was returned for the Dungarvan borough of County Waterford to the Irish House of Commons for two terms, serving from 1692 to 1699. He was a lawyer and attorney and was one of a number of Irish subjects proscribed by James II during the Glorious Revolution in 1689. From his 1700 will, in which he calls himself "William Bucknor of Coolefin" (preserved in abstract form by Betham), he appears to have been one of the sons of John Bucknor of Dromore, an "English Protestant" Royalist who had been a client of the influential FitzGeralds of Dromana. One of the last of them, Sir John FitzGerald (d. 1664), had previously held one of Dungarvan's seats in the Irish Parliament in the 1660s.

Parliament of Ireland
Preceded by John Hore; Martin Hore	Member of Parliament for Dungarvan; 1692–1699; With: Charles Bourchier	Succeeded by James Barry; Roger Power
