= Jerome Alexander =

English-born barrister, judge and politician

Sir Jerome Alexander (c.1585–1670) was an English-born barrister, judge and politician, who spent much of his career in Ireland (after he had been professionally ruined in England), and became a substantial Irish landowner. He was a noted benefactor of Trinity College Dublin. As a judge, he was so ruthless in securing guilty verdicts in criminal cases, and in imposing the death penalty on the guilty party, that for many years after his death "to be Alexandered" was an Irish synonym for being hanged.

== Early career ==
His precise date of birth is uncertain, but he was stated in 1637 to be several years older than Sir Maurice Eustace, who was born in the early 1590s. He was born at Gressenhall, Norfolk, the eldest son of Jerome Alexander senior of Thorpland, an employee of Thomas Howard, 21st Earl of Arundel; the younger Jerome was also employed for a time as steward and bailiff to the Earl, and remained on friendly terms with him in later life. Elrington Ball states that the Alexander family were of Jewish origin. He was educated at Aylsham before attending Gonville and Caius College, Cambridge, where he matriculated in 1609. He entered Furnivall's Inn and then proceeded to Lincoln's Inn in 1617, and was called to the bar in 1623.

=== Disgrace ===
His legal career in England was destroyed by a finding of professional misconduct against him: unusually, this did not arise from his services to a client. He was, unlike many barristers, very litigious on his own behalf, and, in 1626, the Star Chamber found him guilty of tampering with evidence in one of his own lawsuits; he was disbarred, fined and given a prison sentence. He moved to Ireland, where he entered the King's Inn and began to practice at the Irish Bar. It is unclear if the Benchers of the King's Inn were aware from the beginning of his criminal record; if not, they certainly learned of it within the next few years.

In 1633, he received a Royal pardon, on condition that he did not return to legal practice in England, although he was permitted to continue practice in Ireland. In 1644, he published his Breviate, a 100-page pamphlet in defence of his actions.

== Politics ==
He entered politics, and sat in the Irish House of Commons as MP for Lifford in the Parliaments of 1634–35 and 1639–49. He was a friend and client of the wealthy and influential young nobleman James Butler, 1st Duke of Ormonde, who granted him the use of Kilcooly Abbey in County Tipperary for his dwelling. He was also granted lands near Kells, County Meath.

He was also befriended by other influential figures in Ireland, including James Ussher, Archbishop of Armagh: but his hope of further career advancement was destroyed by the arrival in Ireland of the new Lord Lieutenant, Thomas Wentworth, 1st Earl of Strafford, who despised Alexander and described him with contempt as "a scurvy puritan". Strafford, who became almost all-powerful in Ireland, and who was well aware that Alexander had been professionally disgraced in England, vetoed his appointment as an extra judge of assize in 1637.

The ostensible reason was that only Sir Maurice Eustace, the King's Serjeant, was qualified to act as an extra judge, but Strafford's references to Eustace as a "man of integrity" can also be read as an attack on Alexander's character. He refused him leave to go to England, and when Alexander went anyway he was imprisoned in the Fleet Prison, nor following his release was he able to return to Ireland until after Strafford's downfall. Given the enmity between the two men, it is not surprising that Alexander was active in the impeachment and subsequent attainder of Strafford in 1641.

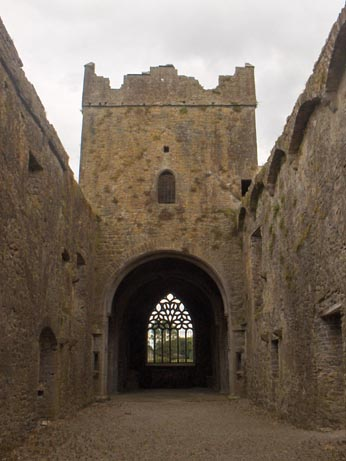
Kilcooley Abbey, which was granted to Alexander.

== Civil War ==
He returned briefly to Ireland after Strafford's death, but on the outbreak of the Irish Rebellion of 1641 went back to England. He was an active Royalist, and attempted to raise troops to subdue the rebels; at the same time, he was among those who urged the King, if necessary, to make an alliance with the Irish Confederacy.

For attempting to arrange this alliance he was briefly imprisoned by Parliament in 1643, and on his release, he went abroad. In 1650, he was in Brussels in the service of Charles II, and was active in raising money for his cause. He was still in the city in March 1653 but returned to Ireland in 1655.

He made his peace with the new regime, and acquired an estate in County Westmeath; but in view of the rewards he received in 1660, (even if, as he complained, they were not overly generous), there is no reason to doubt that he remained a Royalist at heart.

== Restoration ==
At the Restoration of Charles II, Alexander claimed to have played a major part in securing the support of the Irish Government for the new regime (but in fact, there was virtually no opposition in Ireland to the Restoration), and he complained at length about the great losses he had suffered during the Interregnum. He was rewarded with a knighthood and a place on the Court of Common Pleas (Ireland), no doubt largely through the influence of the Duke of Ormonde, who had the last word on appointments to the Irish Bench after the Restoration, and was always loyal (some thought overly so) to old friends like Alexander, although he is not thought to have rated him highly as a judge. Nonetheless, Alexander was plainly dissatisfied at being only second justice of the Court: he claimed that he should have been given the office of Chief Justice of the Irish Common Pleas (Ormonde apparently vetoed the appointment), and quarrelled with Sir William Aston, justice of the Court of King's Bench (Ireland) over which of them had precedence. Rumour had it that he challenged Aston to a duel on the issue, but that to Alexander's disgust Aston refused the challenge. He also acted as legal adviser to the future King James II on his Irish affairs.

== Judge ==
He was a stern enforcer of religious conformity: in his will he refers to the Church of England as "the best form of Government in all this world". On the Ulster assizes, to which he was regularly assigned, he became noted for severity against non-conforming Protestants: his ally John Bramhall, Bishop of Derry wrote that if the non-conformists "could not love him, they began to fear him".

=== Religious beliefs and attitudes ===
It has been suggested that he had an equally harsh attitude towards Roman Catholics, but was unable to show similar severity towards them, due to the relaxed attitude of the Duke of Ormonde, now Lord Lieutenant of Ireland, who recognised that as Catholics comprised the large majority of the country's population, a generous if unofficial measure of toleration of that faith was inevitable.

However, Alexander's attitude to Roman Catholics was perhaps more complex than this: he was, for example, on friendly terms with the well-known Catholic barrister Patrick D'Arcy and reportedly offered to act as D'Arcy's second in the abortive duel with Sir William Aston. Through marriage Alexander himself had Catholic connections. His wife, Elizabeth Havers, belonged to a staunchly Roman Catholic family. Her ancestor, Mr Havers of Thelton (or Thelveton) Hall, built a chapel on the grounds of Thelton Hall which became the hub of the Catholic community in and around Diss, Norfolk, before, during and after the period of the Penal Laws. Elizabeth's elder brother William Havers, who inherited Thelton in 1651, and who died in 1670, was a known recusant. This suggests that Alexander, like many Protestants of his time, was prepared to turn a blind eye to recusancy when it was practised by his own friends or relatives, and even to marry into an openly Catholic family himself.

== "Alexandered" ==
The Duke of Ormonde, who was a merciful man by the standards of the time, is known to have disapproved of Alexander's notorious severity in criminal trials, and this is said to have ended their friendship. This attitude was in notable contrast to the conduct of most other Irish judges of the time who were, like Ormonde, inclined to clemency. Where Ormonde would always reprieve a man where he could, Alexander, it was said, would hang as many men as he could: on one occasion he sentenced fourteen men to death at a single assize, though it is not clear how many of them were actually hanged. His reputation for severity became such that for many years after his death "to be Alexandered" was widely used in Ireland as a synonym for "to be hanged".

== Death and will ==
He died in the summer of 1670 and was buried in St Patrick's Cathedral, Dublin. Much of his property, including Kilcooley Abbey, passed to his daughter Elizabeth, on condition that she did not marry an Irishman (she did not); he also left £100 to each of the three children of his eldest surviving daughter, Jeromina Langham. His law books and other texts were left to Trinity College Dublin, with enough money to pay for a librarian as the King's Inns, of which he was a senior member, had no facilities for storing books at the time, and had to wait till 1788 for the foundation of its own library. His friend, Sir Edward Massey, received many of his personal valuables and curiosities, such as "my cane with the silver head of a rhinoceros".

As he had done in his Breviate, he dwelt in his will on the machinations of his enemies, and rejoiced that God's grace had enabled him to triumph over them. More humanely, he noted that God in return required him to help the poor and needy.

Ball suggests that he would have been most unhappy had he known that his place on the Bench would be taken by Oliver Jones, who was noted for his impartiality towards Roman Catholics, and was widely suspected of being a secret Catholic himself. However, it seems that Alexander, whose wife was a member of a notable Roman Catholic family, may have been more tolerant of the Catholic faith in private than his severe public stance against would suggest.

== Family ==
Sir Jerome married Elizabeth Havers, a staunch Catholic and the daughter of John Havers of Shelfhanger, Norfolk, a noted recusant (who, like Alexander's father, was an employee of the Earl of Arundel), and his wife, Elizabeth Tindal, of Banham. Elizabeth, Lady Alexander, died in 1667. They had sixteen children but only three daughters survived their father:

- Jeromina, who married Humphrey Langham, and had at least five children;
- Rose, who married firstly Roger Mallock of Cockington, Devon, and secondly Thomas Gorges, Deputy Governor of Maine, and died in April 1671, leaving a son and a daughter;
- Elizabeth, who heeded her father's warning that he would disinherit her if she married an Irishman: her (English) husband was Sir William Barker (died c.1719), first of the Barker baronets of Bocking Hall, Essex. She died in 1702, leaving issue, including Sir William Barker, 2nd Baronet.

== Personality ==
Elrington Ball describes Alexander as a "strongly complex character". He was a bitter enemy but a good friend; he was merciless towards criminals, but charitable towards the poor. Throughout his life he was inclined to blame his misfortunes on the machinations of his enemies, even attributing to them responsibility for those disasters which to any detached observer would seem to be entirely his own fault. As a young barrister he was found guilty of misconduct, but as a judge prided himself on not taking bribes. He publicly called for the persecution of Roman Catholics, but married into an openly Catholic family. Burke called him a man of strong passions, but also a man of great integrity and public spirit.

== Published works ==
- A Breviate of a sentence given against Jerome Alexander, utter-barrister of Lincoln's Inn, in the Court of Star Chamber... with exceptions taken to the said sentence to unfold the iniquity thereof. Published in London in 1644.
