= Rathcormack (Parliament of Ireland constituency) =

Pre-1801 Irish constituency

Rathcormac
- Former borough constituency for the Irish House of Commons
- County: County Cork
- Borough: Rathcormac

1611–1801
- Replaced by: Disfranchised

Rathcormac was a constituency represented in the Irish House of Commons from 1611 to 1800. It was a mix of potwalloping and a Manor Borough established by charter and remained tied to the borough and surrounding area. The franchise was vested in the £5 and until 1793, Protestant freeholders and after 1782 a year's residence was necessary. It was disenfranchised on the 1 January 1801 on the coming into force of the Acts of Union 1800 and compensation of £15,000 was paid to the representatives of the Tonson family.

== Borough ==
This constituency was the borough of Rathcormac in County Cork. After its establishment in 1611 it had a sovereign, 12 burgesses and freemen.

== Members of Parliament ==
Election	First MP	Second MP	
1689	James Barry	Edward Powel	
1692	James Barry	Robert Foulke	
September 1703	James Barry	Daniel Gahan	
1703	John Silver	Daniel Gahan	
1713	James Barry	Edward Corker	
November 1715	James Barry	Jephson Busteed	
1715	James Tynte	Jephson Busteed	
1727	James Barry	Redmond Barry	
1728	James Barry	William FitzHerbert	
1743	James Barry	Joseph Leeson	
1743	Brettridge Badham	Joseph Leeson	
1745	John Magill	Joseph Leeson	
1757	John Magill	Abraham Devonsher	
1761	James Dennis	Abraham Devonsher	
1768	James Barry	Abraham Devonsher	
1776	William Tonson	Francis Bernard Beamish	
1783	Charles Francis Sheridan	Sackville Hamilton	
1784	Charles Francis Sheridan	Thomas Orde	
1790	Henry Duquerry	John Philpot Curran	Patriot
January 1798	Charles McDonnell	Henry Boyle, Viscount Boyle	
1798	Charles McDonnell	William Bagwell	
1801	Constituency disenfranchised		

== See also ==
- Rathcormac, a town in County Cork
- Irish House of Commons
- List of Irish constituencies
