= Brice Leeson, 3rd Earl of Milltown =

Anglo-Irish peer

Brice Leeson, 3rd Earl of Milltown (20 December 1735 – 10 January 1807) was an Irish peer.

He was the second son of Joseph Leeson, 1st Earl of Milltown and Cecilia Leigh. He became Earl of Milltown on the death of his brother, Joseph Leeson, 2nd Earl of Milltown on 27 November 1801.

He married (25 October 1765) Maria Graydon (died: 25 July 1772), dau. of John Graydon, of Dublin, by his wife Cassandra Tahourdin, daughter of Gabriel Tahourdin, of Wanstead, co. Essex, a Huguenot refugee from Anjou who became a merchant of the City of London. Gabriel's father, also called Gabriel married Gabrielle Baudouin the sister of René Baudouin, another Huguenot refugee and wealthy Silk Merchant who came from Tours and also became a merchant in the City of London. A memorial to him survives inside the church of St Mary Aldermary, in the City of London, recording the history of his arrival from Tours.

Brice Leeson's home was the family's seat Russborough, Blessington, County Wicklow. He was succeeded by his grandson Joseph Leeson, 4th Earl of Milltown, son of Brice's eldest son Joseph Leeson who died in 1800. His widow Maria died in Dublin in 1842 at the age of 100.

Peerage of Ireland
Preceded by Joseph Leeson	Earl of Milltown; 1801–1807	Succeeded by Joseph Leeson
