= Thomas Carew (1718–1793) =

Irish politician

Thomas Carew (1718–1793) was an Irish politician.

Carew was born in Cork and educated at Trinity College, Dublin.

Carew represented Dungarvan from 1761 until 1768.
