= Earl of Milltown =

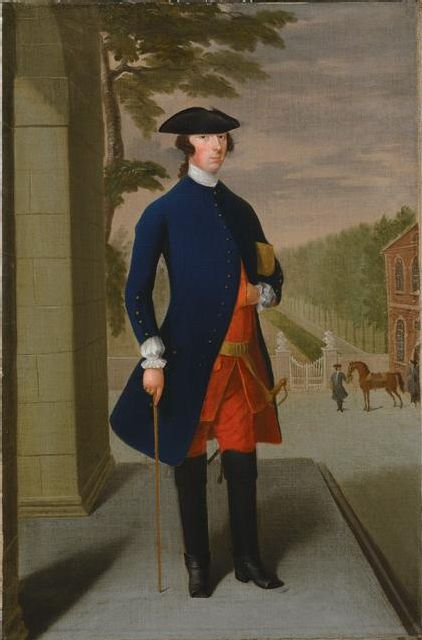
Joseph Leeson, 1st Earl of Milltown.

Earl of Milltown, in the County of Dublin, was a title in the Peerage of Ireland. It was created on 10 May 1763 for the Irish politician Joseph Leeson, 1st Viscount Russborough. He had already been created Baron Russborough, of Russborough in the County of Wicklow, on 5 May 1756, and Viscount Russborough, of Russellstown in the County of Wicklow, on 8 September 1760, also in the Peerage of Ireland. His eldest son, the second Earl, represented Thomastown in the Irish House of Commons. The sixth Earl was elected an Irish representative peer in 1881 and served as Lord Lieutenant of Wicklow. The titles became dormant on the death of the seventh Earl in 1891. Two unsuccessful attempts were made to claim the title, in 1891 and 1905. The title is considered dormant rather than extinct, as it is thought that there may still be living male descendants of the youngest son of the 1st Earl.

The family seat, commissioned by the first Earl, was Russborough House in Ireland.

== Earls of Milltown (1763–1891) ==
- Joseph Leeson, 1st Earl of Milltown (1701–1783)
- Joseph Leeson, 2nd Earl of Milltown (1730–1801)
- Brice Leeson, 3rd Earl of Milltown (1735–1807)
- Joseph Leeson, 4th Earl of Milltown (1799–1866)
- Joseph Henry Leeson, 5th Earl of Milltown (1829–1871)
- Edward Nugent Leeson, 6th Earl of Milltown (1835–1890)
- Henry Leeson, 7th Earl of Milltown (1837–1891; dormant)
