= Joseph Leeson, 4th Earl of Milltown =

Anglo-Irish peer

Joseph Leeson, 4th Earl of Milltown KP (11 February 1799 – 31 January 1866) was an Irish peer, styled Viscount Russborough from 1801 to 1807.

He was the son of the Hon. Joseph Leeson, who died shortly after his birth, and Emily Douglas, third daughter of Archibald Douglas and Mary Crosbie. In 1811 his mother remarried Valentine Lawless, 2nd Baron Cloncurry, and had three further children, including Edward Lawless, 3rd Baron Cloncurry.

He became Earl of Milltown in 1807 on the death of his grandfather, Brice Leeson, 3rd Earl of Milltown, and was appointed a Knight of the Order of St Patrick on 13 March 1841.

He married Barbara Meredyth, daughter of Sir Joshua Colles Meredyth, 8th Baronet and Maria Nugent, and widow of Eyre Coote, 3rd Baron Castle Coote. They had, as well as two daughters, three sons, Joseph, 5th Earl of Milltown, Edward Leeson, 6th Earl of Milltown, and Henry Leeson, 7th and last Earl of Milltown. The title is now dormant, as there is still a possible claim through a younger son of the 1st Earl.

Peerage of Ireland
Preceded by Brice Leeson	Earl of Milltown; 1807–1866	Succeeded by Joseph Leeson
