= Robert Barker (died 1618) =

Robert Barker was one of the two MPs for Ipswich in the English parliament of 1593.
