= Barker baronets of Hambleton (1665) =

Escutcheon of the Barker baronets of Hambleton

The Barker baronetcy, of Hambleton in the County of Rutland, was created in the Baronetage of England on 9 September 1665 for Abel Barker, Member of Parliament for Rutland.

The title became extinct on the death of the 2nd Baronet in 1707.

== Barker baronets, of Hambleton (1665) ==
- Sir Abel Barker, 1st Baronet (c. 1616–1679)
- Sir Thomas Barker, 2nd Baronet (c. 1648–1707)
