= Joseph Leeson, 2nd Earl of Milltown =

Anglo-Irish politician (1730–1801)

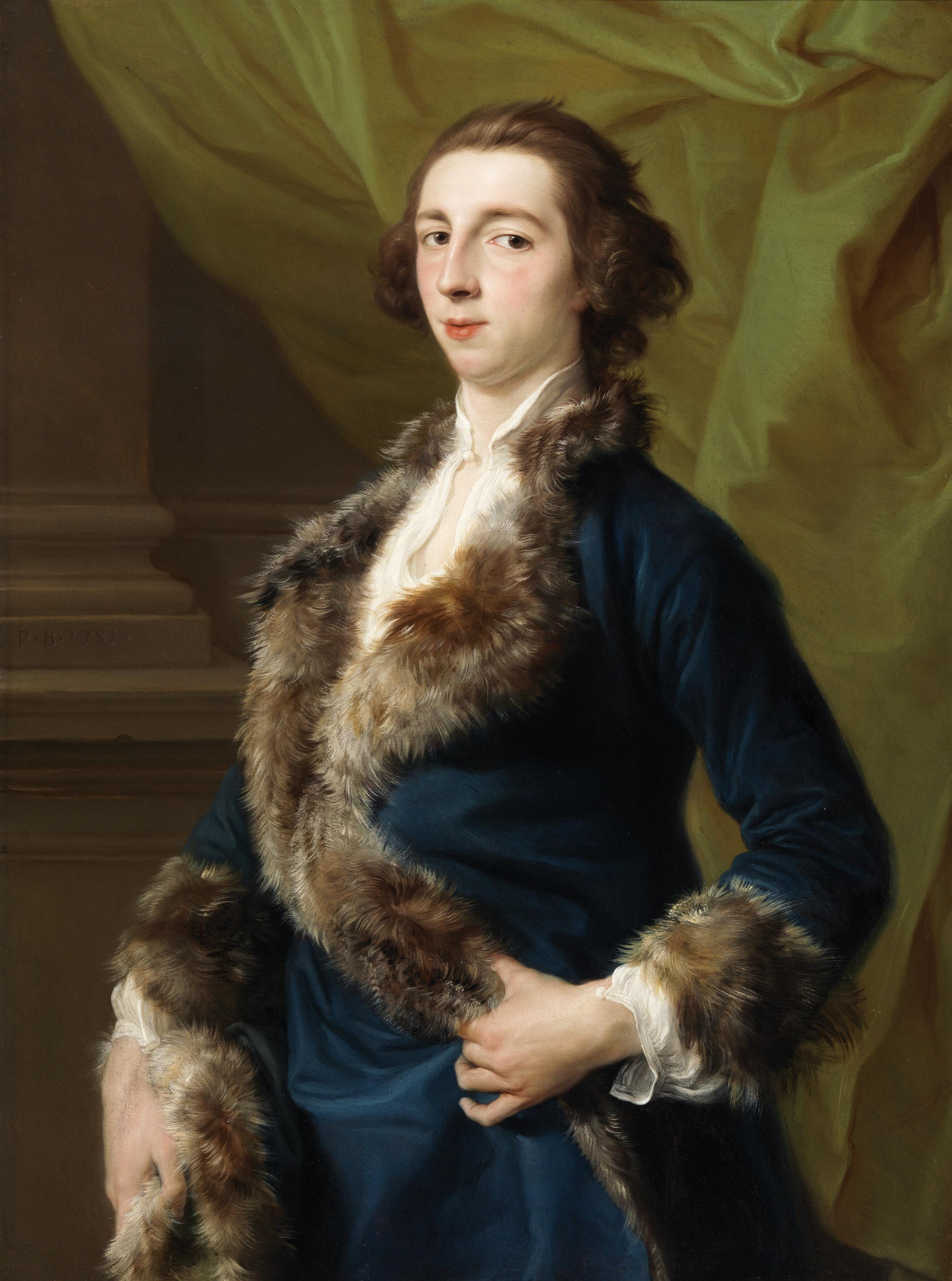
1751 portrait of Milltown by Pompeo Batoni

Joseph Leeson, 2nd Earl of Milltown (1730 – 27 November 1801), styled Viscount Russborough between 1763 and 1783, was an Anglo-Irish politician.

== Life ==
Leeson was the son of Joseph Leeson, 1st Earl of Milltown, by Cecilia, daughter of Francis Leigh, of Rathangan. He had his portrait painted in 1751 in Italy and he is thought to have had an affair with Peg Plunkett who took his surname even though they never married.

He was elected to the Irish House of Commons for Thomastown in 1757, a seat he held until 1761. He became known by the courtesy title Viscount Russborough when his father was elevated to an earldom in 1763. In 1783 he succeeded in the earldom and took his seat in the Irish House of Lords.

Lord Milltown died aged 72 on 27 November 1801 at Chelsea, London, England. and was succeeded by his younger brother, Brice Leeson.

Parliament of Ireland
Preceded by Nicholas Aylward; Redmond Morres	Member of Parliament for Thomastown; 1757–1761; With: Redmond Morres	Succeeded by Alexander McAuley; Thomas Eyre
Peerage of Ireland
Preceded by Joseph Leeson	Earl of Milltown; 1783–1801	Succeeded by Brice Leeson
