= Dungarvan (Parliament of Ireland constituency) =

Pre-1801 Irish constituency

- Former borough constituency for the Irish House of Commons
- County: County Waterford
- Borough: Dungarvan

1610–1801
- Replaced by: Dungarvan (UKHC)

Dungarvan was a constituency represented in the Irish House of Commons until 1801.

== History ==
In the Patriot Parliament of 1689 summoned by James II, Dungarvan was represented with two members.

== Members of Parliament, 1610–1801 ==
- 1560 Henry Stafford (or Gifford) and John Challoner
- 1613–1615 Peter Rowe and Thomas Fitz-Harrys
- 1634–1635 Sir Peter Smithe of Ballynatray and John Hore
- 1639–1649 Sir Richard Osborne, 2nd Baronet and John Hore
- 1661–1665 John FitzGerald of Dromana and Sir Allen Brodrick

=== 1689–1801 ===
Election	First MP	Second MP
1689	John Hore	Martin Hore
1692	Charles Bourchier	William Buckner
1703	James Barry (1659–1717)	Roger Power
1709	James Barry (1659–1717)	Henry Pyne
1713	James Barry (1689–1743)	Robert Carew
1715	James Barry (1659–1717)	Robert Carew
1717	Redmond Barry	Robert Carew
1721	Redmond Barry	James Barry (1689–1743)
1727	Benjamin Parry	Thomas Carter (Note: Also elected for Hillsborough in 1727, for which he chose to sit)
October 1727	Benjamin Parry	Thomas Uniacke (Note: Declared not duly elected in 1727)
1728	Benjamin Parry	Robert Dillon
1736	Robert Roberts	Robert Dillon
1747	Robert Roberts	John Ussher
1749	Robert Roberts	Richard Boyle (Note: Styled as Viscount Boyle from 1756)
1758	Robert Boyle-Walsingham	Richard Boyle
1761	Robert Boyle-Walsingham	Thomas Carew
1768	Sir William Osborne, 8th Bt	Robert Carew
1776	Sir William Osborne, 8th Bt	John Bennett (Note: Declared not duly elected in 1776)
1777	Sir William Osborne, 8th Bt	Godfrey Greene
1783	Marcus Beresford	Godfrey Greene
1790	Marcus Beresford	Chambre Brabazon Ponsonby
January 1798	Marcus Beresford	John Brabazon Ponsonby
April 1798	Edward Lee	John Brabazon Ponsonby
1801	Succeeded by the Westminster constituency Dungarvan	

== Bibliography ==
- O'Hart, John (2007). The Irish and Anglo-Irish Landed Gentry: When Cromwell came to Ireland. Vol. II. Heritage Books. ISBN 0-7884-1927-7.
- Leigh Rayment's historical List of Members of the Irish House of Commons. Cites: Johnston-Liik, Edith Mary (2002). The History of the Irish Parliament 1692-1800 (6 volumes). Ulster Historical Foundation.
