= Kilcooly Abbey =

Cistercian abbey in County Tipperary, Ireland

Kilcooley Abbey
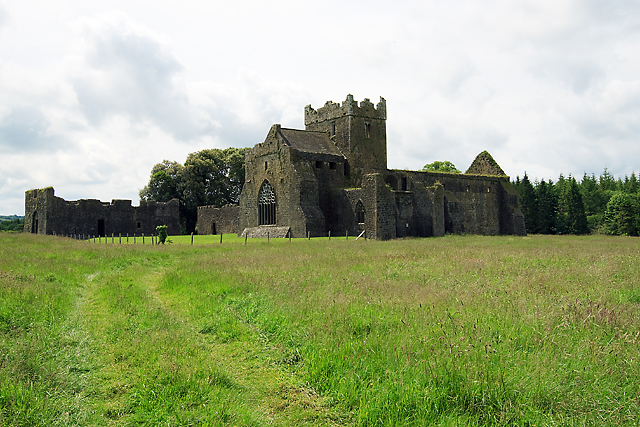
- Kilcooley Abbey

- Location within Ireland
- 52°40′14″N 07°34′17″W
- Location: Gortnahoe, County Tipperary, Ireland
- Denomination: Roman Catholic
- Religious institute: Cistercians

History
- Status: Active as parochial church
- Founded: 1182 (844 years ago)
- Founder: Domnall Mór Ua Briain

Architecture
- Heritage designation: National Monument
- Style: Cistercian

Administration
- Diocese: Roman Catholic Archdiocese of Cashel and Emly

Kilcooley Abbey is a Cistercian abbey near the village of Gortnahoe in County Tipperary, Ireland. The abbey is located inside the grounds of the Kilcooley Estate. This abbey dates from 1182 when the King of Thomond Donal Mor O’Brien granted lands to the Cistercians, to build an abbey here. The abbey, which was built around 1200 is dedicated to the Virgin Mary and St. Benedict and shares similar Cistercian architecture with both Jerpoint Abbey and Holy Cross Abbey. The abbey is open to the public. After the Reformation and the dissolution of the monasteries, Kilcooley passed into the possession of the Earl of Ormond. It was granted to the English-born judge Sir Jerome Alexander in the 1630s. It passed to his daughter Elizabeth, and then through marriage to the Barker baronets of Bocking Hall, the last of whom died in 1818.

== Structure ==
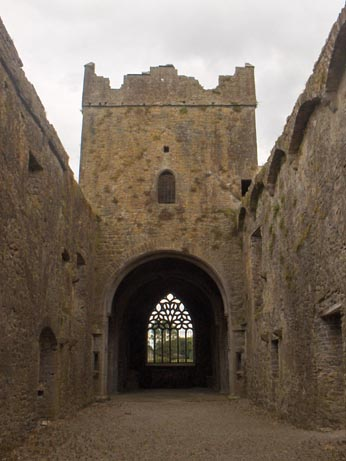
The tower with the flamboyant east window below it

The main part of the abbey consists of the entrance chamber, the church, the tower, and the sacristy. The entrance chamber has a carved baptismal font on its south wall. The nave of the church is still roofed, but the rest of it is out in the open. The church has two large carved windows on its east and west side. The chancel contains two stone tombs and a stone altar. One of these tombs is that of the knight Piers Fitz Oge Butler. His tomb records his death as taking place in 1526, and has some carvings of 10 apostles on the side of it carved by Rory O Tunney, who is also noted for his work in Jerpoint Abbey. On top of the Butler tomb, there is the effigy of a knight with a dog curled up at his feet. The sacristy is entered through a carved archway that has many carvings, such as a scene depicting the crucifixion and a mermaid holding a mirror, which was meant to depict vanity. Roger Stalley suspects this screen wall may represent the entrance to a private Butler chapel, as two Butler shields are depicted. The east end of the nave contains seats for the officiating clergy which have been carved into the crossing piers.

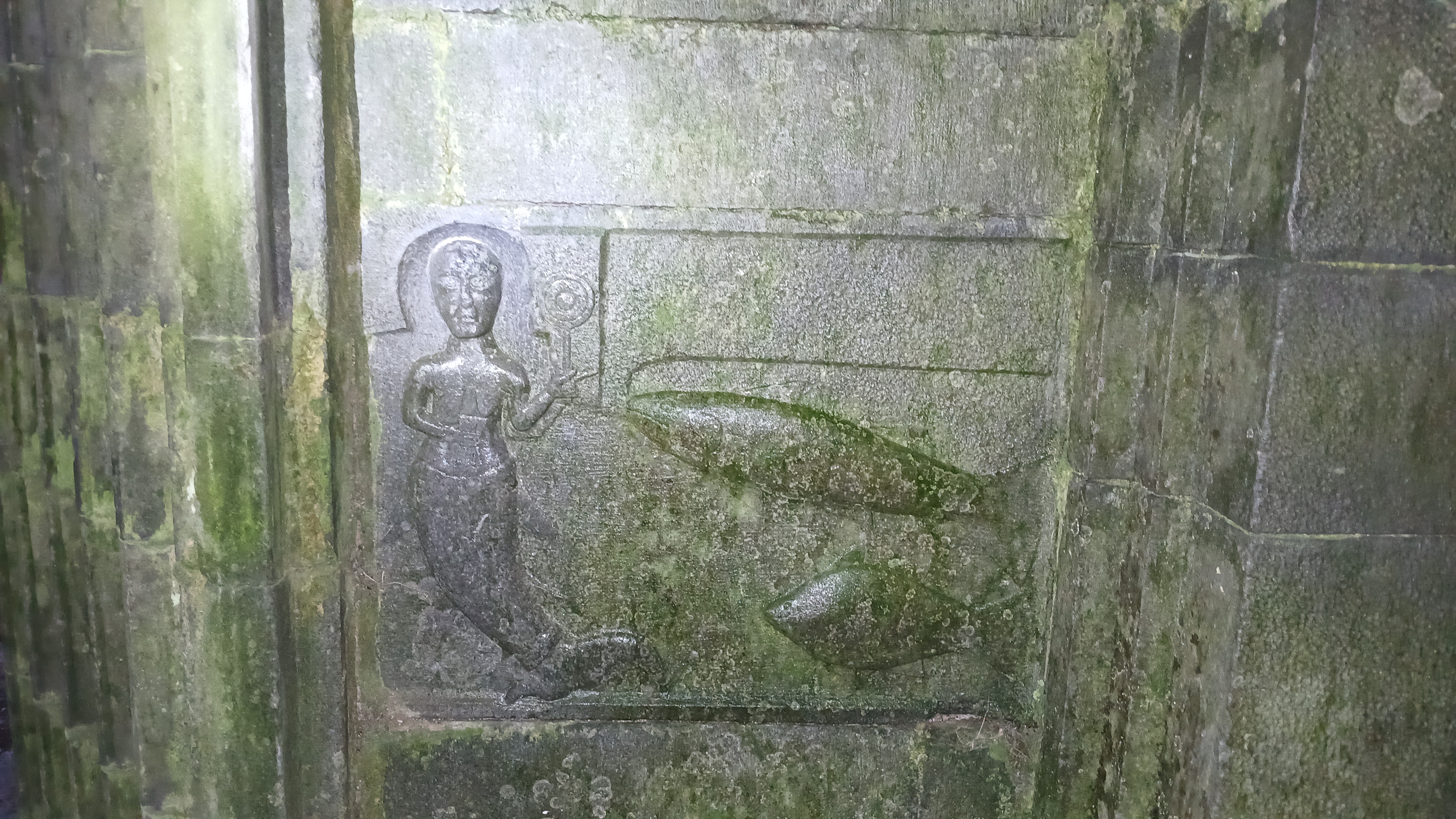
Mermaid at Kilcooly Abbey

Outside the abbey, there is also a beehive-shaped ruin. It is not known whether this was used as a columbarium to store ashes or a dove-cote for pigeons. But most probably it was a dove-cote since there is a 3-foot (0.91 m) wide hole in the ceiling from which they would have entered and left. Also outside the abbey is the infirmary which is still in fairly good condition although access to its roof is blocked.

The cloisters of the abbey are long gone with only one column still remaining. The path of the cloisters though still remains with a pebbled walkway around the grass square. The centre even has a large tree growing in it. Beside the cloisters, the parlour and chapter house are still there. Also, the calefactory (warming room) still remains but without a roof. And on the south side of the cloisters, the refectory (monks' dining hall) still stands. Although it has no roof, it still has a spiral staircase, but this has been barred up. The rooms on the second floor include the dortoir and the main tower — locked up by the Office of Public Works. The parlour, chapter house, and calefactory are also barred.

Kilcooly Abbey was also used in the making of the film "Excalibur" by John Boorman, which is based on the tale of King Arthur and the knights of the round table.

There is a pyramid structure on the grounds of the abbey.

== Burials ==
- John Butler of Clonamicklon (died 1330)

== Gallery ==
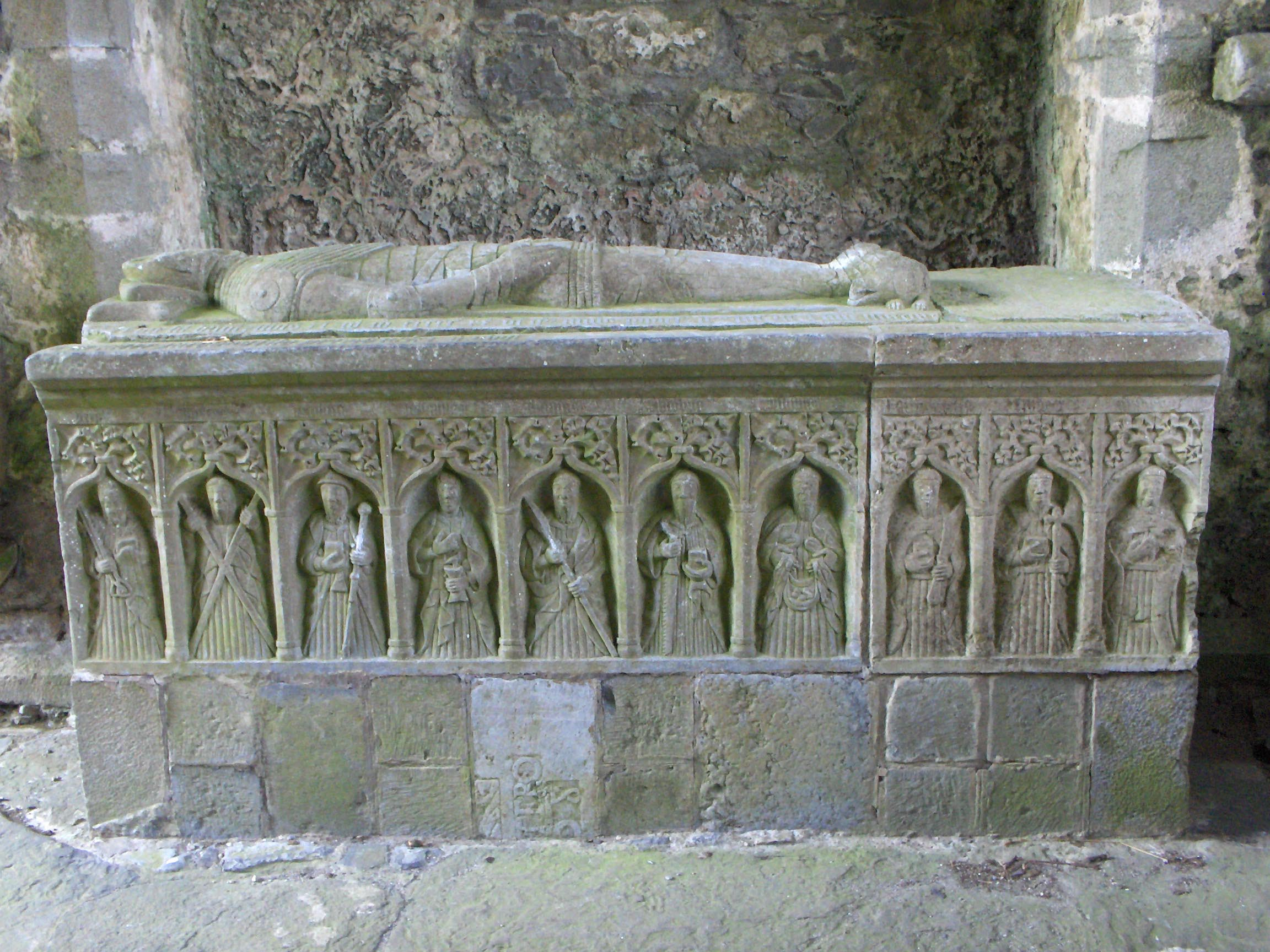
Knight's tomb

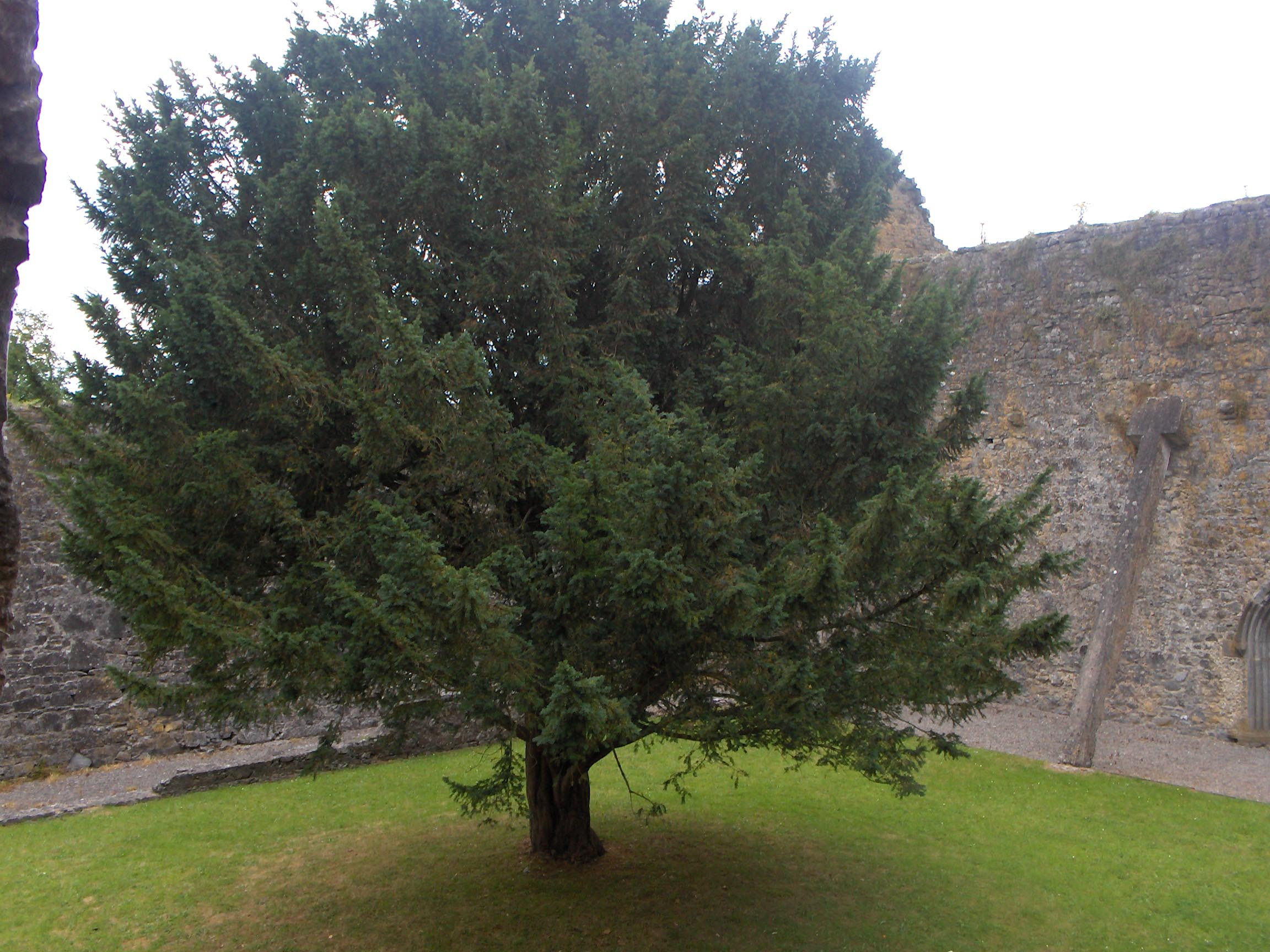
Tree in the garth

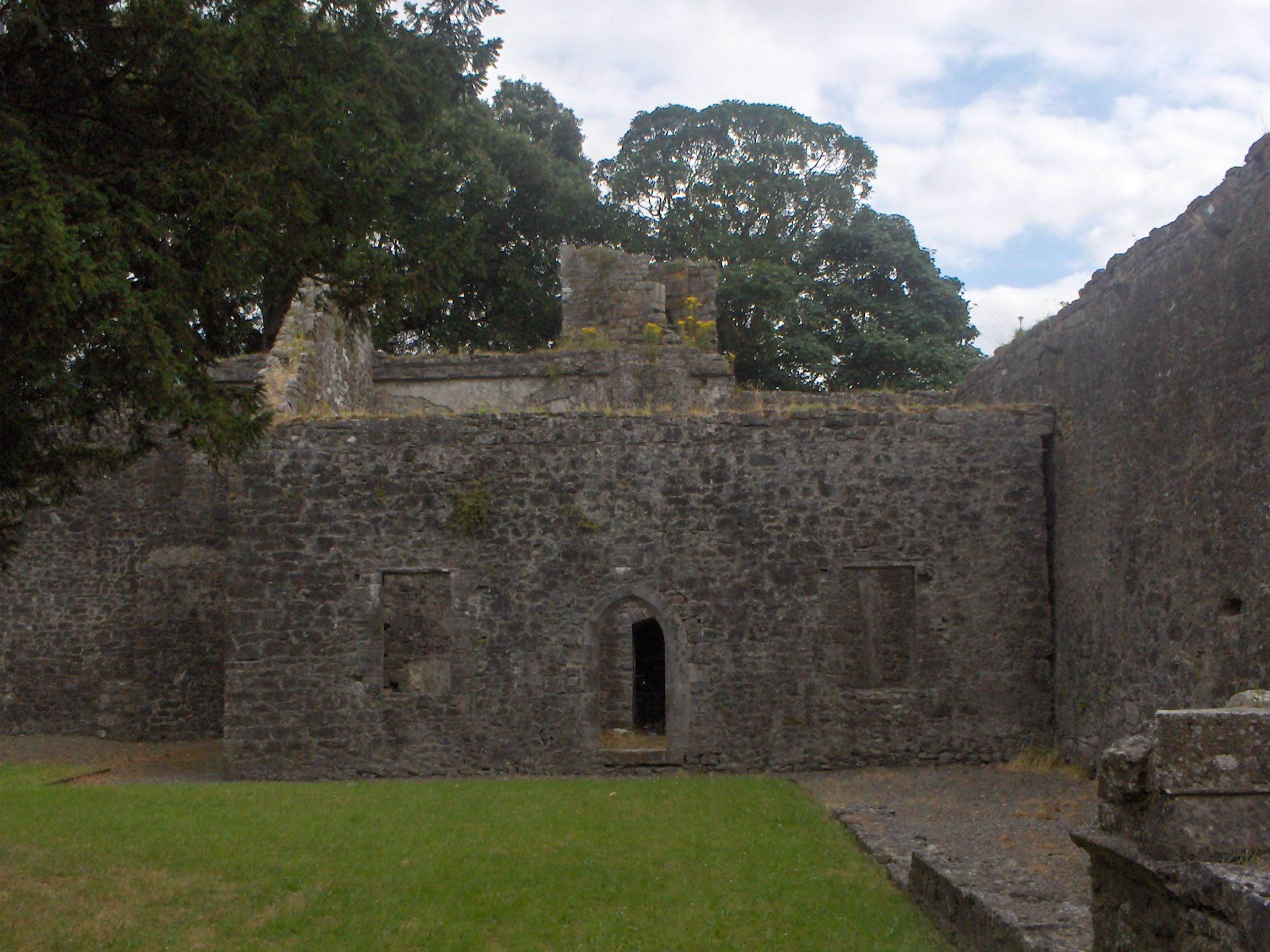
Refectory

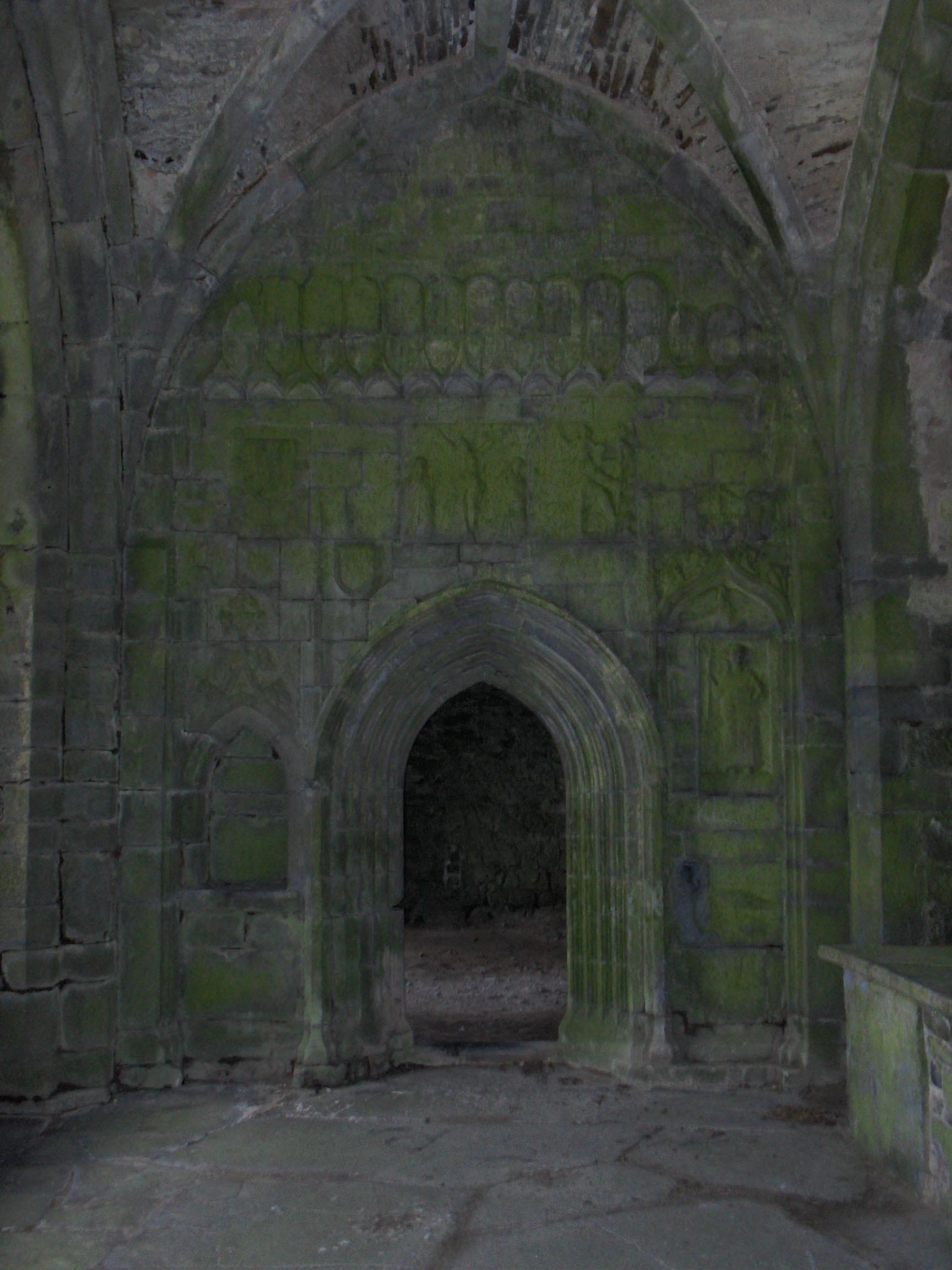
Archway to the sacristy

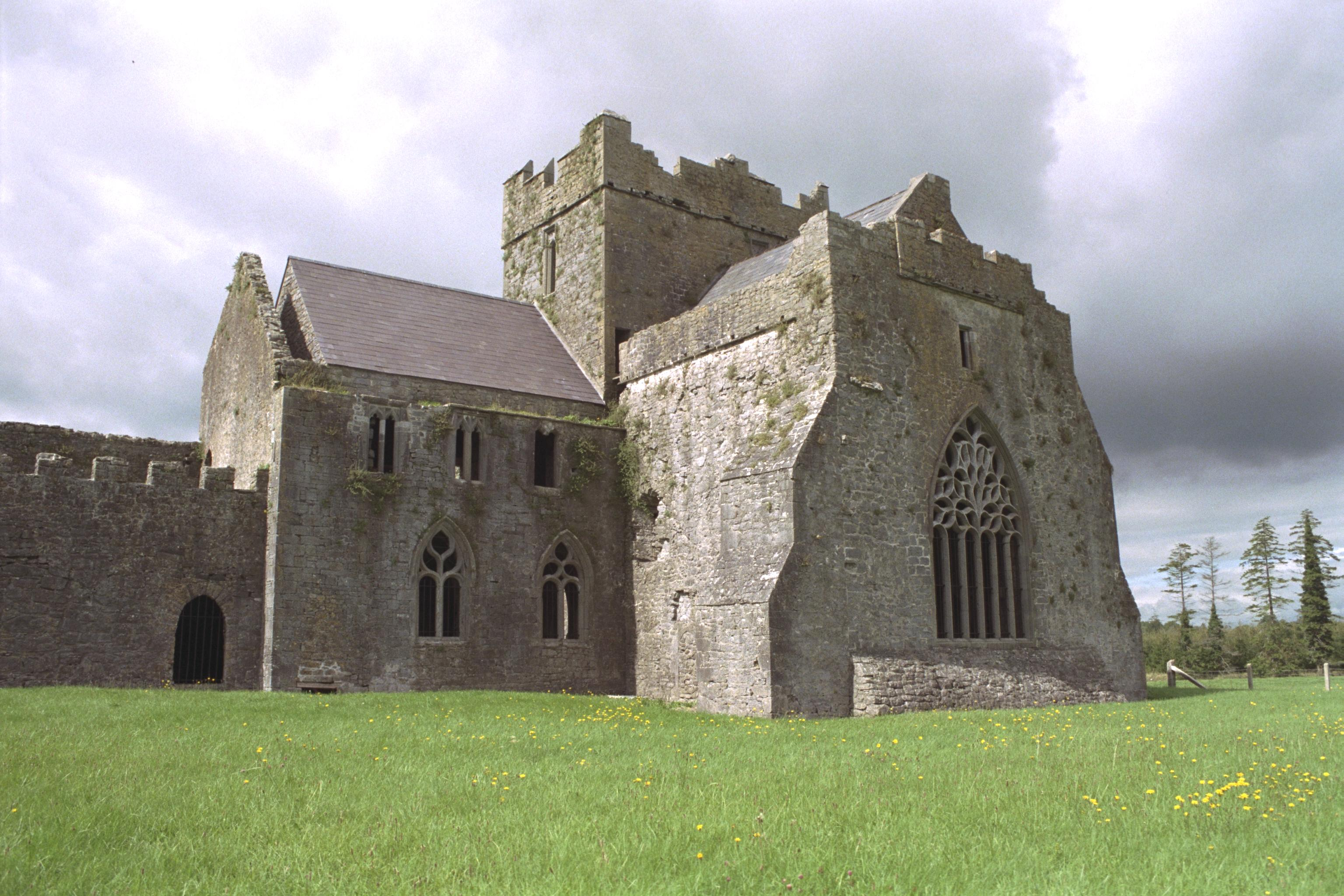
Kilcooly Abbey Choir and South Transept 1997 08 30

== See also ==
- List of abbeys and priories in Ireland (County Tipperary)
