= John Silver (politician) =

Colonel John Silver (c. 1665 – 1724) was a member of the Irish House of Commons.

== Biography ==
He was the son of John Silver of Youghal by his wife Elizabeth, daughter of Charles Oliver. He married Joan, daughter and heiress of Blayney Sandford; their daughter Jane Catherine married Robert Oliver and her son Silver Oliver inherited his grandmother's estates.

Silver represented Rathcormack from 1703 to 1713, and was a supporter of the government.
