= Redmond Barry (died 1750) =

Irish politician

Redmond Barry (by September 1696 – September 1750) was an Irish Member of Parliament.

In 1717 he was elected to sit in the Irish House of Commons for Dungarvan. In the next general election, in 1727, he was elected for both Tallow and Rathcormack, sitting for the latter until his death.
