= Jephson Busteed =

Irish politician

Jephson Busteed was an Irish politician.

Busteed was born in County Cork and educated at Trinity College, Dublin. He was MP for Midleton from 1713 to 1714; Rathcormack from 1715 to 1727; and Doneraile from 1727 to 1728.
