= Joseph Leeson, 1st Earl of Milltown =

Irish peer and politician

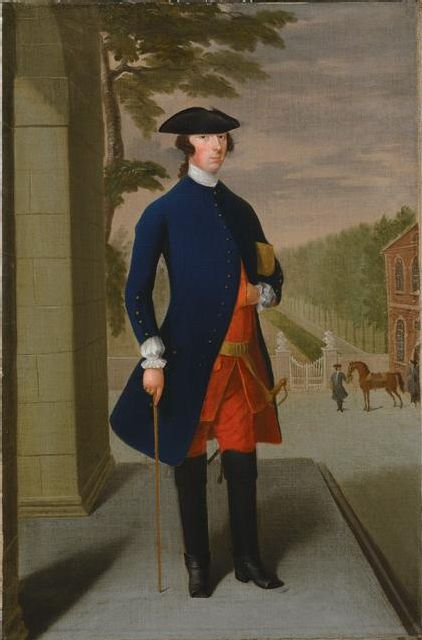

Member of the Irish House of Commons
- In office 1743–1756

Joseph Leeson, 1st Earl of Milltown (11 March 1701 – 2 October 1783) was an Irish peer and politician.

== Background ==
He was the son of Joseph Leeson, a brewer in Dublin, and Mary Brice, daughter of Alderman Andrew Brice, Sheriff of Dublin. His grandfather Hugh Leeson of Culworth in Northamptonshire came to Ireland about 1680, as an officer in military service, and made a fortune as a brewer, acquiring much property in the area around what is now Dawson Street. The name Leeson is found in Ireland before 1680; four Leesons occurred in the lists of army personnel in the Ormond Manuscripts, the earliest in 1644. The Earl had one known sibling – his sister, Joyce Leeson, who married Sir Robert Blackwood, 1st Baronet, the ancestor of the Barons Dufferin and Claneboye).

== Political career ==
Between 1743 and 1756, Leeson sat in the Irish House of Commons for Rathcormack. He was created Baron Russborough, in the County of Wicklow, on 5 May 1756, Viscount Russborough, of Russellstown in the County of Wicklow, on 8 September 1760, and Earl of Milltown, in the County of Dublin, on 10 May 1763.

== Family and legacy ==
On 20 January 1729, he married Cecilia Leigh, daughter of Francis Leigh. They had three children:

- The Hon. Joseph Leeson, later styled Viscount Russborough, later 2nd Earl of Milltown (1730–1801)
- The Lady Mary Leeson (1734–1794) (married the 2nd Earl of Mayo)
- The Hon. Brice Leeson, later 3rd Earl of Milltown (1735–1807)

Cecilia had died by 1738, when Leeson married Anne Preston, daughter of Nathaniel Preston, on 20 October 1738. They had one daughter:

- The Lady Anne Leeson (married Hugh Henry)

Anne died on 17 January 1766, and Leeson married thirdly Elizabeth French, daughter of the Very Revd William French, Dean of Ardagh, on 10 February 1768. They had four children:

- The Hon. William Leeson (1770–1819)
- The Hon. Robert Leeson (1773–1850)
- The Lady Cecilia Leeson (married David La Touche and had a daughter Elizabeth who married William Crosbie, 4th Baron Brandon, and gained notoriety as the reputed mistress of William Lamb, 2nd Viscount Melbourne)
- The Lady Florence Arabella Leeson (d. 1840) (married Marcus Beresford, a grandson of the 1st Earl of Tyrone)

Lord Milltown died on 2 October 1783 at the age of 82. His third wife died on 23 January 1842 having lived 55 years past his death. In 1728 Suesey Street in Dublin was renamed Leeson Street, presumably in his honour. Lord Milltown commissioned Russborough House, a particularly fine example of Palladian architecture, designed by Richard Cassels and built between 1741 and 1755. The interior of the house contrasts with the austere exterior by way of some ornate plasterwork on the ceilings by the Lafranchini brothers. It is the longest house in Ireland, with a frontage measuring 210 m/700 ft, and is considered by some the most beautiful.

The title Earl of Milltown became dormant in 1891 on the death of the 7th Earl, as it is thought that there may still be living male descendants of the youngest son of the 1st Earl.

Parliament of Ireland
Preceded by James Barry; William FitzHerbert	Member of Parliament for Rathcormack; 1743–1756; With: James Barry 1743; Brettridge Badham 1743–1745; John Magill 1745–1756	Succeeded by John Magill; Abraham Devonsher
Peerage of Ireland
New creation	Earl of Milltown; 1763–1783	Succeeded by Joseph Leeson
New creation	Viscount Russborough; 1760–1783	Succeeded by Joseph Leeson
New creation	Baron Russborough; 1756–1783	Succeeded by Joseph Leeson
