= Thomas Marlay =

Thomas Marlay could refer to:

- Thomas Marlay (judge), Irish politician and judge
- Thomas Marlay (British Army officer), Irish soldier and son of the judge
