= Celbridge =

Town in County Kildare, Ireland

Celbridge Cill Droichid (Irish)
- Town
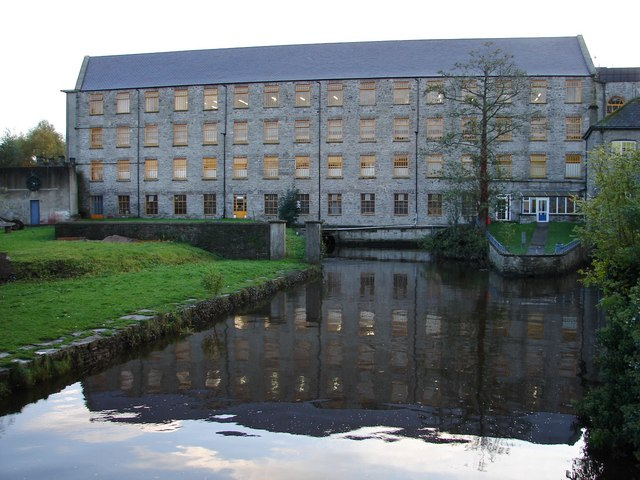
- The Mill, Celbridge

- Location in Ireland
- Coordinates: 53.338°N 6.53880°W
- Country: Ireland
- Province: Leinster
- County: County Kildare
- Elevation: 55 m (180 ft)

Population (2022)
  - Urban: 20,601
- Time zone: UTC0 (WET)
  - Summer (DST): UTC+1 (IST)
- Eircode: W23
- Telephone area code: 01
- Irish Grid Reference: N971330
- Website: celbridge.ie

Celbridge (/ˈsɛlbrɪdʒ/; Irish: Cill Droichid [ˌciːl̠ʲ ˈd̪ˠɾˠeːdʲ], historically anglicised Kildrought) is a town and townland on the River Liffey in County Kildare, Ireland. It is 23 km (14 mi) west of Dublin. Both a local centre and a commuter town within the Greater Dublin Area, it is located at the intersection of the R403 and R405 regional roads. As of the 2022 census, Celbridge was the third largest town in County Kildare by population, with 20,601 residents.

The origins of Celbridge can be traced to a 7th-century ecclesiastical settlement founded by St Mochua, known as Cill Droichid ("church of the bridge"), being anglicised to Celbridge after 1714. The present town developed around this ecclesiastical settlement, with significant expansion occurring from the 18th century.

== Etymology ==
The name Celbridge is derived from the Irish Cill Droichid meaning "Church of bridge" or "Church by the bridge". The Irish name was historically anglicised as Kildroicht, Kildrought, Kildroght, Kildrout (/kɪlˈdraʊt/).

== History ==
=== Origins ===
There is evidence of 5,000 years of habitation, as evidenced by beads and quern stones in the National Museum from Griffinrath (53°20′56″N 6°34′26″W), and the nearby high ground sloping down to the Liffey. Research has linked Celbridge with the Slí Mór possibly crossing the Liffey at a ford located below the site of the mill directly east of the bridge rather than at Castletown House, as previously thought.

The etymology of Donaghcumper Church (church of the confluence, "Domhnach" is one of the earliest Irish words for church) (53°20′20″N 6°31′37″W.) suggests it may have existed as a monastic site from the 5th century.

Folklore and heroic literature associate the north bank of Celbridge with both Saint Patrick (hill and church of uncertain antiquity in Ardrass) (53°19′33″N 6°34′40″W.) and Saint Mochua (c.570), who was associated with a church in Tea Lane (53°20′20″N 6°32′49″W.), and a well on the site of the current mill where pagan converts were baptised.

=== Parish of Kildrought ===
The original Kildrought parish church (built 14th century, burned 1798) stood in the present graveyard at Tea Lane and houses the mausoleums of the Dongan and Conolly families. It was granted by the Normans to the Abbey of St Thomas in Dublin. Donaghcumper Church (c1150) had windows of cut stone inserted into the building in the 14th century. Its ruins are extant in the main graveyard in Celbridge, and members of the Alan family are buried in the church vault.

The old parish of Donaghcumper consisted of the modern townlands of Parsonstown, Rinnawad, Ballyoulster, Commons, Coneyboro, Coolfitch, Donaghcumper, Elm Hall, Loughlinstown, Newtown, Reeves, Simmonstown, Straleek and St. Wolstans. Pre Norman churches served the adjoining parishes in Donaghcumper (53°20′20″N 6°31′37″W.) and Stacumny (53°20′04″N 6°30′05″W.) (mentioned 1176, burned 1297, held in 1308 by a parson, Waleys) to the east, Adherrig or Aderrig further to the east (Athdearg or Red Ford, church first mentioned 1220) (53°20′27″N 6°29′17″W.), Kilmacreddock (53°21′55″N 6°31′38″W.) to the north east, the tiny parish of Donaghmore (plundered 1150, mentioned in letter 1190) further to the north (53°22′37″N 6°33′15″W.), Laraghbryan (plundered 1036 and 1171) (53°22′55″N 6°36′49″W.) to the north west, and Killadoon (53°19′39″N 6°33′24″W.) to the south.

The modern Catholic parish of Celbridge and Straffan comprises the medieval parishes of Kildrought and Straffan, as well as the former parishes of Stacumny, Donaghcumper, Killadoon, Castledillon and Kilmacredock. The parish of Stacumny (Teach Cumni) originally included the townlands of Ballymadeer, Balscott and Stacumny. Killadoon from Cill an Dún may get its name from the earthen mound that still stands by the gate leading into the grounds surrounding Killadoon House. On the left-hand side of the avenue, as you enter through the gate, there is an overgrown churchyard with some headstones. Killadoon parish embraced the present townlands of Ardrass, Ballymakeally, Crippaun, Killadoon, Killenlea and Posseckstown. Kilmacredock is the smallest of the medieval parishes. A roofless ruin is all that remains of the original church. It is named for Redoc, who had a son who established a religious foundation southwest of the present town of Leixlip. Bellingham family members were buried in a vault in the floor of the building, but their remains were removed in the mid-20th century.

=== Town of Kildrought ===
The town of Kildrought or Kildroighid developed around the castle, monastery and mill of Kildrought which Thomas de Hereford, the Norman Lord of Kildrought erected early in the 13th century. The one long street running between the de Hereford Castle and lands of Castletown, and the mill, had taken shape by 1314 when Henry le Waleys was charged at a Naas court of "breaking the doors" of houses in the town of Kildrought and by night "taking geese, hens, beer and other victuals" against the will of the people of the town.

By the time of the Down Survey (1654–1656) the population was 102 and the Dongan family were in possession of all the land in Celbridge. Killadoon House was the home of John Dongan's brother in law Richard Talbot Earl of Tyrconnell. Dongan died at the Battle of the Boyne and is buried in Tea Lane cemetery. Talbot died immediately before the Siege of Limerick. His widow remained in Killadoon, outliving the two men who took over the town from her husband and John Dongan, Bartholmew Van Homrigh and William Conolly.

=== Kildrought to Celbridge ===
The present day houses in Celbridge Main Street and town centre were built over a period of two hundred years. Celbridge Abbey was built in 1703 by a Dutch Williamite emigre, Bartholmew Van Homrigh. He was appointed Chief Commissioner for Stores in Ireland for the victorious allied forces of William III and Mary II who defeated the Jacobite alliance, and enforced the Treaty of Limerick in 1691. He moved to Kildrought Manor in 1695. When William "Speaker" Conolly purchased the rundown Castletown Estate in 1709 from Thomas Dongan, the restored Earl of Limerick and later Governor of New York, he complained that "all the Earl's tenants were beggars". Conolly built his new mansion at Castletown, cleared the existing tenantry and began to develop the town. Improvers and speculative developers followed Conolly to Celbridge. The new leases were granted on condition that the builders erect substantial stone houses with gable ends and two chimneys, replacing mud cabins and waste ground.

Existing mercantile buildings such as the 17th-century Market House, where the town's first school was based in 1709, were incorporated into the expanding mill complex of buildings near the bridge. Developers began to survey e green field sites to the north east of the bridge in the direction of Castletown House. The result was to move the axis of Celbridge away from the bridge, corn and tuck mill and road to St Mochua's church to a new Main Street.

The old Irish name Cill Droichid (Kildrought), meaning the church of the bridge, was anglicised first to Cellbridge and then, after 1724, to Celbridge. Swift in his letters to Vanessa always named the place "Kildrought", but she replied from "Celbridge".

Celbridge's 18th-century bridge had to be rebuilt after it was destroyed in a flood in December 1802.

=== Later development ===
Historical population
Year	Pop.	±%
1655	102	—
1811	2,108	+1966.7%
1821	1,260	−40.2%
1831	1,647	+30.7%
1841	1,206	−26.8%
1851	1,674	+38.8%
1861	1,592	−4.9%
1871	1,391	−12.6%
1881	988	−29.0%
1891	811	−17.9%
1901	885	+9.1%
1911	812	−8.2%
1926	643	−20.8%
1936	627	−2.5%
1946	539	−14.0%
1951	567	+5.2%
1956	1,228	+116.6%
1961	1,371	+11.6%
1966	1,514	+10.4%
1971	1,744	+15.2%
1979	3,230	+85.2%
1981	4,583	+41.9%
1986	7,135	+55.7%
1991	9,629	+35.0%
1996	12,289	+27.6%
2002	14,251	+16.0%
2006	17,262	+21.1%
2011	19,537	+13.2%
2016	20,288	+3.8%
2021	20,601	+1.5%

Six main residential and commercial areas were developed in Celbridge over a period of 250 years: Main Street (1720–1750), Tea (or Tay) Lane (1760), Maynooth Road (1790, when construction of Jasmine Lodge replaced six cabins on Main Street and eight cabins on Maynooth Road), English Row (1805–1811), Ballyoulster (1948–1951), and St Patrick's Park (two phases 1954–1957 and 1964–1967). The historical population of the town in the 19th and 20th century period closely mirrored periods of activity and cyclical closure of the town's woollen mills, once the largest in the country.

==== Housing estates ====
Celbridge was rezoned for rapid growth under the 1967 Kildare Development Plan. That year a consortium of Brian and Tony Rhattigan and the McMullan brothers, who owned the Maxol petroleum group, purchased most of the former Castletown Estate for development purposes. Planning permission was granted on appeal for a suburban housing estate along the edge of the avenue leading into Castletown House. In response Desmond Guinness personally bought the house in 1967 to save the immediate hinterland from development and established the Irish Georgian Society in the building. Permission was granted for the first development of 400 houses within the gates of Castletown in 1969 and the first phase of Castletown Estate was opened by Minister for Industry and Commerce Justin Keating on 1 October 1975. This was followed by more than 30 housing developments over the next thirty years. The 1986 census listed Celbridge (+54.9pc) as the fastest growing town in Ireland.

The population, which had been 1,514 in 1966, rose to 1,744 in 1971, 3,230 in 1979, 4,583 in 1981, 7,135 in 1986, 9,629 in 1991, 12,289 in 1996, 14,251 in 2002 and 17,262 in 2006.

A 2008 planning application by Devondale Ltd for a new €750m mixed-use development at Donaghcumper Demesne for offices, shops, restaurants, sixscreen cinema and 108 detached houses on the 98-acre (400,000 m^{2}) site, which is being promoted as "a natural extension" to Celbridge, has been criticised by local planners for being "on a city scale rather than a more acceptable town scale." The plans ultimately failed to materialise.

== Historic buildings and places ==
=== Main Street ===
The development of the Main Street commenced with the building of Kildrought House by Joseph Rotheny in 1720 for Robert Baillie, a Dublin upholsterer who was William Conolly's greatest prospect as an improving tenant. A large extension, which included a malt house, was added after Baillie sold in 1749. Kildrought house became home to John Begnall's Academy after 1782. Among the attendees were the sons of Col George Napier, George, Charles, William and Henry, later to be collectively known as "Wellington's Colonels," and their younger brother Richard Napier, and John Jebb (1775–1833), later Church of Ireland bishop of Limerick, Ardfert, and Aghadoe. Jeremiah Haughton, owner of the Mill lived there after 1818. For a time in the early 19th century, Kildrought House had a cholera hospital attached to it and served as the local police barracks from 1831 to 1841 when the barrack moved to the site of the current Michaelangelo's restaurant. After 1861 it was leased by Richard Maunsell of Oakley Park. Next door is the courthouse where the local petty sessions took place every fourth week. It later became home of Lloyd Christian, athletics pioneer and colleague of Michael Cusack in the hurling revival of the 1880s.

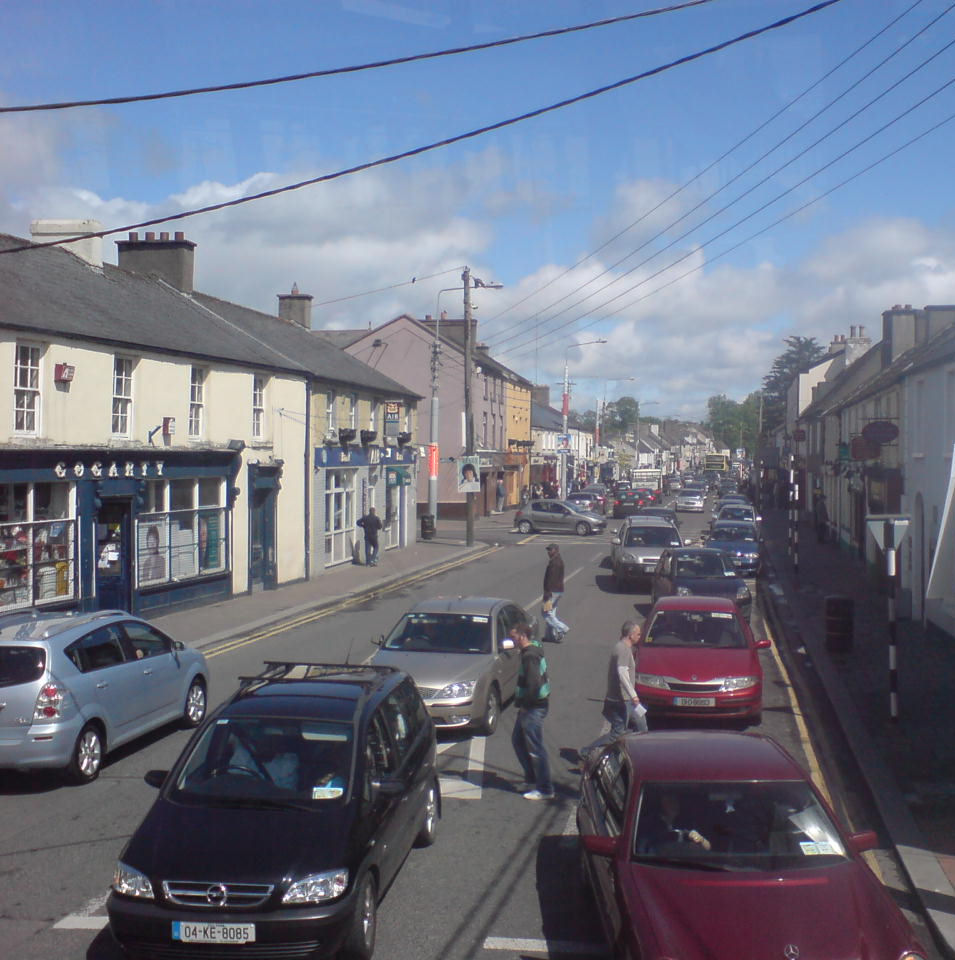
Celbridge Main Street

No. 22 Main Street, the original home of Conolly's second agent George Finey was occupied by Richard Guinness for a time and his sons Arthur, founder of the Guinness brewery, and Samuel. Richard married Elizabeth Clare, proprietor of the White Hart Inn, a public house at the site of the current Londis supermarket. Finey's successor as Conolly's agent, Dublin cabinetmaker Charles Davis, built Jessamine Lodge, an impressive fivebay house with a weather vane on the junction of Main Street and the Maynooth Road (1750). It was home to seven generations of Mulligans until 1992. One of the Mulligans had the decorative iron arch to the entrance gate constructed from material salvaged from the GPO Dublin after the 1916 Rising. The Castletown Inn stands where Isaac Annesley, the early 18th-century master stonemason, lived. One of the oldest houses in the town. No 59 next door, was renovated in the latter half of the 18th century for Thomas Conolly's huntsman. Christopher Barry's Auctioneers was built in 1840 by Richard Nelson and let to Chief Constable Marley, it replaced an old dwellinghouse with stables and offices where William Wadsworth, the original Irish Straw Manufacturer and exporter lived and operated at the end of the 19th century. On the corner of the Main Street and Liffey Bridge, Broe's house and shop (1773) is now the Bank of Ireland. Matthew Gogarty came from Clondalkin in 1818 and established his shop on the other side of the street. James Carberry's Brewery (1709) later became Coyles and eventually Norris's and the Village Inn. Roseville was built in 1796.

Other notable buildings on Main Street include the Catholic Church (1857 JJ McCarthy Architect), the Holy Faith convent (1877) and Christ Church (Church of Ireland, 1884) which retains the tower of an earlier church (1813). Castletown gates at the end of the street were built in 1783 after a design inspired by Batty Langley. According to research by local historian Lena Boylan, the work was by a stonemason named Coates and a blacksmith named Behan.

=== Temple Mills ===
The oldest mill in the area is Temple Mills, operated by the Tyrrell family for 300 years, 2 km outside the town on the Ardclough Road(53°20′01″N 6°32′41″W.). Joseph Shaw's flax and flour mills was a major employer in the town until its closure after the death of William Shaw.

==== Templeplace: a vanished settlement ====
The now disappeared "town" of Templeplace is recording as having a population of 279 in 1841, 310 in 1851, 382 in 1861, 402 in 1871 and was, after 1881, included in the townland of Newtown "on which it stood" as it "did not contain 20 inhabited houses." A footnote to the census returns comments "the decline in population is attributed to the discontinuance of the flax mill". The population of Newtown in 1891 was 128, down from 145.

=== Celbridge Mill ===
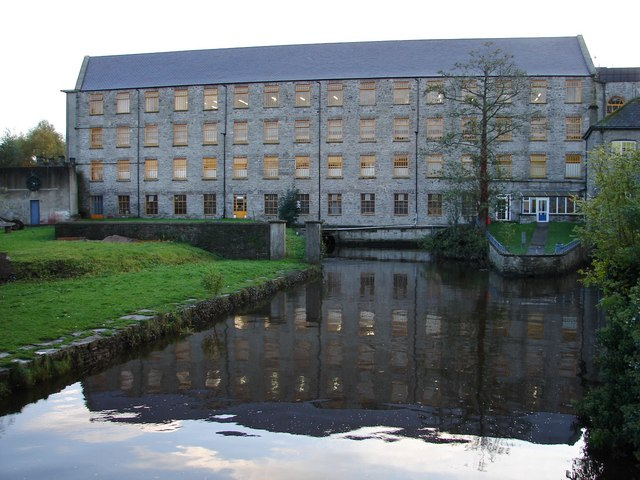
The Mill

The Manor Mills (built by Louisa Conolly in 1785–1788, extended by Laurence Atkinson 1805, restored 1985) incorporate parts of the old Celbridge Market House. It was purchased by Jeremiah and Thomas Houghton after Atkinson's bankruptcy in 1815. When the Houghton partnership became bankrupt in 1818 Jeremiah took charge of the operation. Houghton told a parliamentary committee that this mill was the biggest wool manufactory in Ireland. the mill was described as employing several hundred people when King George IV visited Celbridge in August 1821 and the description "biggest wool manufactory in Ireland" was repeated in the 1845 Parliamentary Gazetteer. It employed 600 people at full capacity, some of them children who were eight and nine years of age. Workers from Yorkshire who came to work in the mill lived in Tea Lane (so called because of the amount of discarded tea leaves on the street) and English Row. The closure of the mills in 1879 caused the population of Celbridge to plunge from a 19th-century peak of 1,674 in 1861 (1,391 in 1871) to 988 in 1881 and a low of 811 in 1891

Under the Irish Government regeneration scheme of the 1930s, the Leinster Hand Weaving Company acquired the premises for conversion into a weaving mill. Celbridge woollen mill was operated by Youghal carpets (acquired 1966, workforce extended from 120 jobs in October 1969.). It was a major employer until its closure in May 1982 with the loss of 220 jobs. This ended two centuries of intermittent wool production in the village. The mill now serves as a community centre. Its warehouses which bear a wallmount dating the Mill to 1785, and a stone commemorating the site of St Mochua's well.

Mills at Coneyburrow (Newbridge, near St. Wolstan's) (53°20′52″N 6°30′45″W.) were granted to Robert Randall, Dublin paper maker, in 1729, and were later converted for use as a flourmill.

=== Brewery ===
After Richard Guinness married Elizabeth Read (1698–1742), of a brewing family from Bishopscourt and an aunt of Arthur Guinness, he took over the town brewery in 1722 and moved it from the site of the Village Inn to where the entrance forecourt of the Holy Faith convent is today There he placed his land steward Richard Guinness in charge of production of "a brew of a very palatable nature". In 1752, Dr Price's estate bequeathed £100 to Richard's son, the 27-year-old Arthur Guinness to help him expand the brewery, first in 1755 on a new site in Leixlip and from 1759 in St James's Gate in Dublin. Some of the blocked up doors from the original PriceGuinness brewery can still be seen on the perimeter walls of the Catholic Church forecourt.

=== Workhouse ===
Celbridge workhouse was constructed between 1839 and 1841 and is the smallest of three workhouses in County Kildare. It was built at a cost of £6,800 and was designed to house 519 people from Celbridge, Lucan, Rathcoole, Leixlip, Maynooth and Kilcock, an area containing 25,424 people.

A site on the Maynooth road has a memorial to between 1,500 and 2,500 inmates who died and were buried there during the Great Famine of 1845/47, subsequently restored by the community. According to Tony Doohan's "History of Celbridge" during the worst of this disaster, a human being died every hour. Another historian Seamus Cummins suggests that the effects of the famine in the Celbridge Poor Law District area were less traumatic than elsewhere (such as south Kildare) because of the availability of wage economy employment in the district.

After the 1860s the workhouse was used as a fever hospital, regarded as progressive for its time, as a home for the elderly and infirm, and for unmarried mothers. Orphans and illegitimate children were fostered out into the village community from the workhouse and also from the Holy Faith convents in Dublin.

In 1922 the workhouse was used as a base by the Free State army, was visited by General Michael Collins and there are claims that the barracks was the first in which the uniform of the new Free State army was worn. After 1923 the workhouse was closed and the barracks vacated. By 1933 the Union Paint factory had been established on the site and in 1934 there were plans for a rope factory by Henry's from Cork Street in Dublin. In 1939 the current Garda barracks was built on part of the workhouse site.

The workhouse is now a paint shop.

=== Former Methodist Hall ===
The cut stone former Methodist Hall on Ardclough Road fell into disrepair during the 1980s but was acquired and renovated by Cunninghams Funeral Directors in the mid-1990s.

=== Other industry ===
John Wynn Baker (c. 1730 – 1775), agricultural improver and writer, established the first factory in Ireland in 1765 with the financial assistance of the Dublin Society on a 354-acre (1.43 km^{2}) property at Elm Hall on the Loughlinstown Road near the newly constructed Grand Canal at Hazlehatch for manufacturing agricultural implements.

One of Celbridge's most original industries was the Callender Paper Company established in Celbridge in 1903 to make paper from peat. Despite the report in the Irish Times of 25 June 1904 that facilities of the company were "totally inadequate to cope with demand" and that "Celbridge peat paper is finding its way into almost every village and hamlet in Ireland" the enterprise had already run into financial trouble by November 1904.

In 1977 French electrical group Telemecanigue invested £6m in establishing a factory on the Maynooth Road, employing 500 people at peak. Schneider MGTE group closed the factory in September 2003.

== Houses outside the town ==
=== Castletown House ===
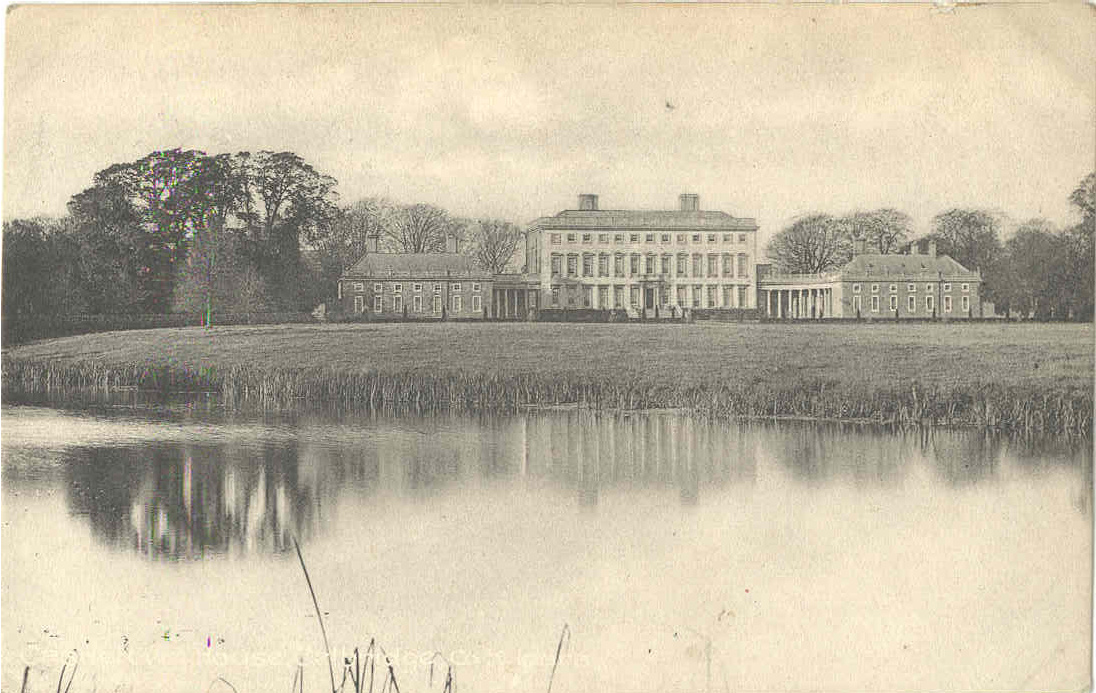
Castletown House, late 19th century-photograph from the fields between the house and the River Liffey, showing an almost full view of this major Palladian house.

Castletown House is situated at the end of an avenue extending from the main street. It is Ireland's original and largest Palladian country house. Building commenced in 1722 by William "Speaker" Conolly (1662–1729), Speaker of the Irish House of Commons, who came under the influence of the Neo-Palladians, whose adherents included Alessandro Galilei, believed to have designed the main house, and Edward Lovett Pearce, thought to have designed the entrance hall and the long gallery in its original form, as well as the colonnades and wings. Pearce did commissions for William Conolly before his speculated involvement with Castletown.

The house was inherited by Tom Conolly (1738–1803) in 1758 and the interior decoration was finished by his wife Louisa Lennox (greatgranddaughter of Charles II of England and Louise de Keroualle) during the 1760s and 1770s.

Two of the best known features of Castletown are the Long Gallery (an 80-foot (24 m) long room decorated in the Pompeian manner in blue and gold), and the main staircase (which is cantilevered and made of white Portland stone).

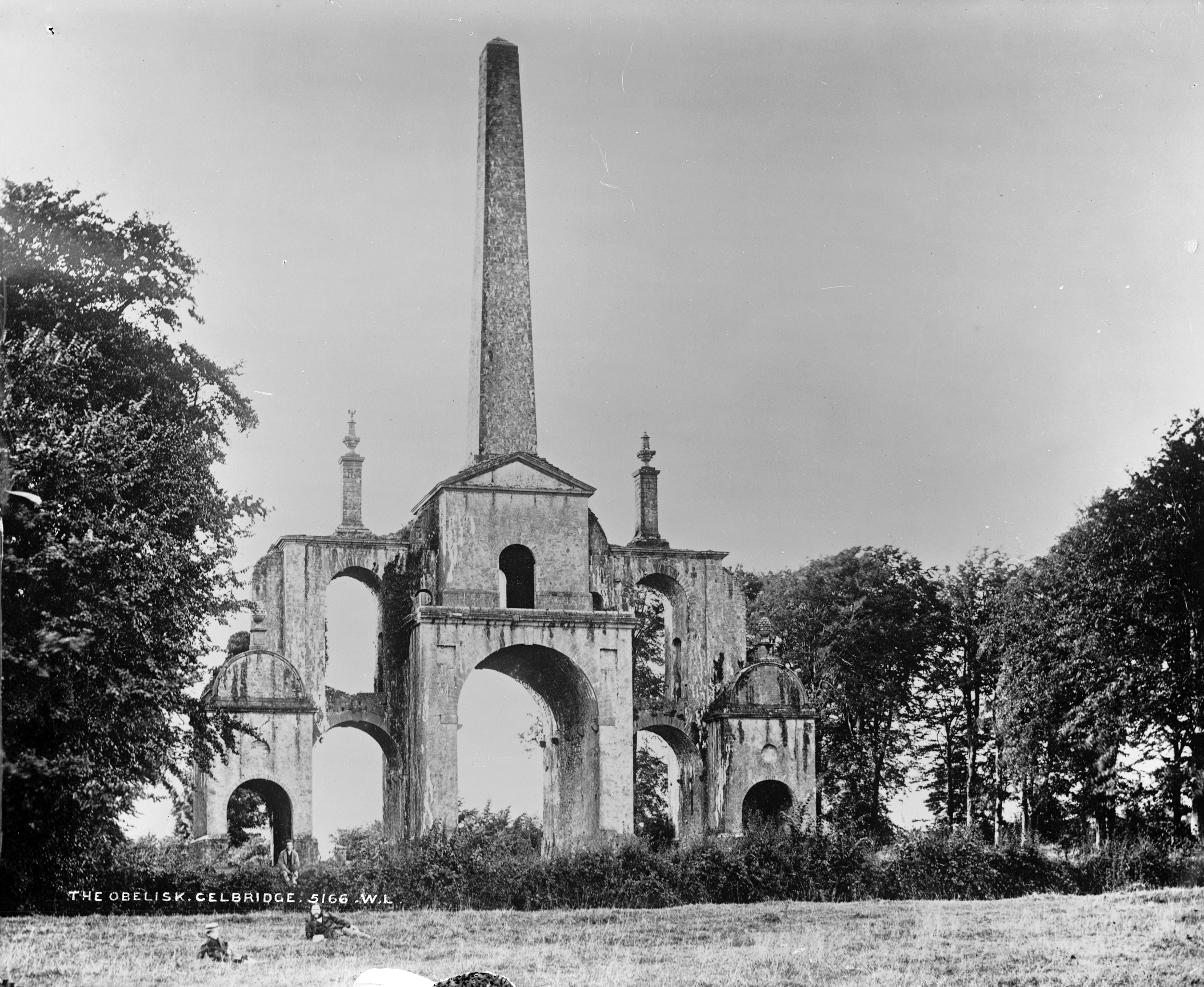
The Obelisk

Conolly's Folly (also known as "The Obelisk") is an obelisk structure. It is built to the rear of Castletown House which contains two follies, both commissioned by the widow of Speaker William Conolly to provide employment for the poor of Celbridge at a time when famine was rife. As such these monuments serve no real purpose, instead they were dedicated to battles in the 16th century. The Obelisk was built in 1739 after a particularly severe winter. Designed by Richard Castle, it is 42 metres high and is composed of several arches, adorned by stone pineapples and eagles.

The main avenue from the town is no longer accessible by vehicular traffic, which must enter the grounds from the roundabout off the M4.

=== Celbridge Abbey ===
Celbridge Abbey was the childhood (1688–1707) and later adult (1714–1723) home of Bartholomew Van Homrigh's daughter Esther (1688–1723), the ill-starred lover of Dean Swift. The poem in which Swift fictionalised her as "Vanessa" "Cadenus and Vanessa" (1713) was written seven years before he visited her in Celbridge in 1720. A rock bower associated with the lovers is a 19th-century recreation. The current Celbridge Abbey was constructed by Thomas Marlay, Lord Chief Justice of Ireland, grandfather of the Irish parliamentarian Henry Grattan. His daughter Mary was married to James Grattan, Henry Grattan's father and a member of the Irish House of Commons. A later occupant was Gerald Dease, a Catholic nobleman who entertained the Empress of Austria during her visit to Ireland. He is buried in a prominent position on front of the local Catholic church, the construction of which he helped to fund. The rock bridge in Celbridge Abbey grounds is now the oldest stone bridge across the Liffey since the removal of John Le Decer's 1308 bridge three miles downriver at Salmon Leap.

=== Oakley Park (St Raphael's) ===
Oakley Park, the current St. Raphael's hospital was built in 1724 to a design by Thomas Burgh for Arthur Price, when he was created Church of Ireland Bishop of Meath. The house was built close to the small stone house of his father vicar of Kildrought and Straffan Samuel Price. Dr Price had previously been Bishop of Clonfert, Ferns & Leighlin, and later became Archbishop of Cashel. After his departure for Cashel, Oakley Park became home to Col George Napier, Richard Maunsell, High Sheriff of Kildare and his descendants, and, in 1926 Justin McCarthy. In 1946 it was sold by Philip Guiney the Irish Christian Brothers for use as an industrial school but sold instead to the St John of God Brothers and opened as St Raphael's Hospital, a home for intellectually disabled boys in 1953. The grand parents of Henry Grattan are buried in a private graveyard on the site.

=== Collegiate School (formerly Setanta Hotel, now Celbridge Manor Hotel) ===
The former Collegiate School on the Clane Road was built 1732 by architect Thomas Burgh who also built the Royal Barracks and famous library building at Trinity College both in Dublin. The Collegiate School was founded as a charity school by Louisa Conolly of Castletown (1743–1821). At the time of Lady Louisa's death it had 600 pupils, and served as a boarding school for Protestant girls until 1973. when the Incorporated Society for Promoting Protestant Schools in Ireland closed the school and transferred the pupils to Kilkenny. The building reopened as the Setanta Hotel on 25 January 1980. Setanta Hotel closed down in 2008 but has since been refurbished and has reopened as the four-star Celbridge Manor Hotel.

=== St Wolstan's ===
St Wolstan's, near the site of the ancient Abbey of St Wolstan's described by Mervyn Archdall in his "Monasticon Hibernicum" in 1786 was originally a monastery in the Order of St Victor. It was founded c1202 by one of Strongbow's companions for Adam de Hereford. It was named for St Wulfstan, Bishop of Worcester, then newly canonised by Pope Innocent III. Before the time of the Dissolution of the Monasteries it had extensive lands in Kildare and Dublin with buildings covering an estimated 20 acres. It was the first Irish Monastery to be dissolved when Sir Gerald Aylmer of nearby Lyons (died 1559) petitioned Henry VIII. It then became the home to the ill-fated Lord Chancellor and Archbishop of Dublin John Alen (1476–1534). St Wolstan's after the Archbishop's cousin, also John Alen, who was master of the rolls, travelled with Aylmer to England in 1536 to receive the bill for suppression of the Irish monasteries. The act of St Wolstan's, introduced in September 1536 as a special commission of dissolution, assured Aylmer and his fellow chief justice and brother-in-law Thomas Luttrell an annual rent of £4 during the life of Sir Richard Weston, the last prior, while Alen was granted the monastery estates. The house remained with the Alen family for two subsequent centuries. St Wolstan's was then home to later Bishops of Clogher (Robert Clayton) and Limerick, a summer resident of the Viceroy in the 1770s, a boys' school (sold 1809), home to the Cane family for another century and eventually a girls' secondary school (1957–1999) run by the Holy Faith sisters. When a new school building was built on the Clane Road in 2001, opening on 8 October, the name St. Wolstan's was reused for this.

=== Other houses ===
Other large houses outside the town include Killadoon a three-storey block with a single storey wing built c. 1770 (redecorated 1820) for Nathaniel Clements MP, banker and amateur architect. Clements is reputed to have designed Colganstown House, built in the area by the Yeats family c. 1760. It is associated with the Andrews, Sherlock, Colgan and Meade families. Pickering Forest is a three-storey Georgian house associated with the Brooke (Barons Somerton) and later Ogilby families. Donaghcumper is a Tudor revival house built by William Kirkpatrick c1835, was sold after the death of Ivone Kirkpatrick to J Bruce Bredin, Springfield was associated with the Jones and Warren families and then the Mitchell family until 1906.

== Demographics ==
Celbridge is the third largest town in County Kildare. The population increased by 7.8% between 2002 and 2006, the town's most rapid growth rate in absolute terms (3,011 in four years). However, in percentage terms, it was a slowdown on previous growth rates which were at one stage the highest in Ireland. Celbridge's growth slowed down to 1.5% between 2016 and 2022, reaching a population of 20,601 as of the census of 2022.

Of the 2006 population of 17,262. 8,732 were male and 8,530 female, 4,307 (25pc) were aged 0–14, 2,678 (15.5pc) were aged 15–24, 6,219 (35pc) were aged 35–44, 3,400 (19.7pc) were aged 45–64 and 658 (3.6pc) were aged 65 years and over. Of these 9,586 were single, 6,602 were married, 715 were widowed and 359 were separated. Only 4,146 (24.4pc) of the 16,980 who were recorded by the census as "usually resident in Celbridge" had been born in County Kildare. 10,071 (59.3pc) had been born elsewhere in Ireland and 2,763 (16.3pc) were born outside Ireland.

== Religion ==
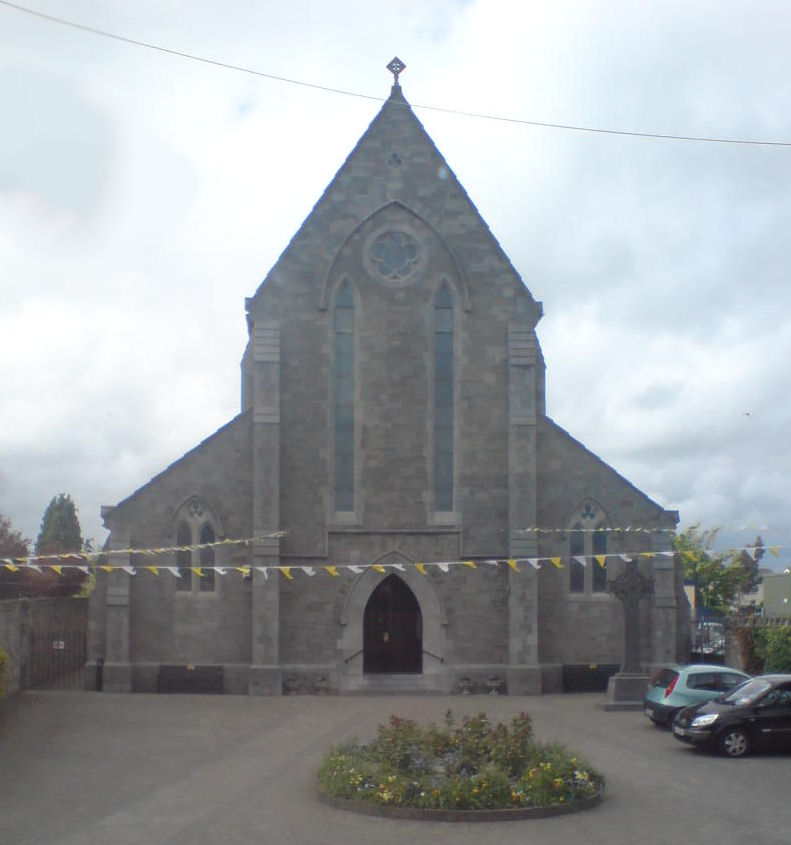
St. Patrick's Church

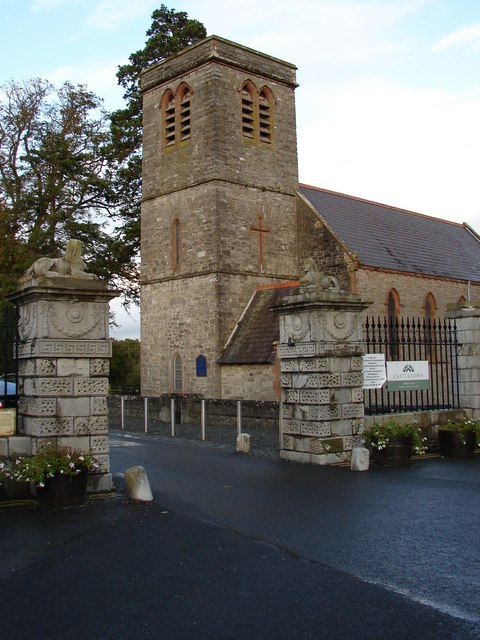
Christ Church

Celbridges's two main parish churches are those of St. Patrick (Catholic) and Christ Church (Church of Ireland). St Patrick's forms part of the Catholic Parish of Celbridge and Straffan within the Archdiocese of Dublin. Christ Church is the Anglican Parish Church for Celbridge and forms part of the grouped Parish of Celbridge, Straffan and Newcastle-Lyons in the Archdiocese of Dublin and Diocese of Glendalough.

The Bridge Church is a non-denominational independent church formed in 2005.

== Education ==
Celbridge has six primary schools: Primrose Hill (co-ed, COI), Scoil Naomh Brid for girls, Aghards also known as Scoil Mochua (mixed, RC), Scoil na Mainistreach (mixed, RC), North Kildare Educate Together National School (mixed, multi-denominational), and St Patrick's currently located in the GAA grounds on the Newcastle road (mixed, RC), and three secondary schools: Celbridge Community School (a coeducational school, operating under the auspices of the Kildare/Wicklow Education & Training Board and Educate Together.), St. Wolstan's Community School for girls (the only all-female community school in Ireland), and Salesian College Celbridge for boys.

There is also a residential special school, Saint Raphael's, (co-educational, Catholic) for children with a learning disability. Celbridge also has one of the very few Primary Montessori Schools in Ireland, Weston Primary Montessori School, which was established in 2016 by the parents and teachers of the former Glebe School. This school provides Montessori education to children from 3–12 years and is located on the grounds of Barnhall Rugby Club.

== Transport and access ==
Celbridge's growth has created some traffic congestion, including at peak times. A 2008 report by Kildare County Council attributed some of the issues to the single bridge over the Liffey in the town, and issues with illegal parking and parking enforcement. The Celbridge Interchange (Junction 6 of the M4) which connects the town to the motorway as well as the Intel and Hewlett-Packard plants in Leixlip, was opened in 2003 to help address related traffic issues, with some success.

The town is served by Dublin Bus along the C4, X27 and X28 routes along with a night time service (C6). Local services are also provided by Dublin Bus, as the L58 and L59, while Go-Ahead Ireland operate the W6. These routes link the town to the city centre, as well as to the nearby towns of Lucan, Maynooth and Leixlip. The Town is also served by Bus Éireann route 120 and 120B.

Iarnród Éireann runs commuter rail services to a station in Hazelhatch, about 3 km (2 mi) from Celbridge. The L58, L59 and W61 bus services link the station with the rest of Celbridge, Leixlip, and Maynooth, providing connections to other bus and rail routes. Commuter suburban rail services from Kildare to Dublin city centre serve Hazelhatch, although these are quite limited on Sundays. The service brings passengers to Heuston station or to Grand Canal Dock (via Connolly Station, Tara Street and Pearse Street stations). The station is located on one of the most important InterCity lines in the country, with services to Cork, Limerick and Galway, however, these do not stop at Hazelhatch station.

== Sport and voluntary groups ==
=== GAA ===
Celbridge GAA park and centre on the Hazelhatch Road was opened in 1996, ending 52 years without a home, the club having lost its field in Ballymakeally after a court case in 1944. Celbridge GAA club is the third oldest club in County Kildare, formed on 15 August 1885, eight months after the GAA was founded in Thurles. In 1890 there were two clubs in the parish: Celbridge Shamrocks, based in Kilwogan with 64 members, and the Irish Harpers at Hazelhatch, with 70 members.

Celbridge play at senior level in both codes. They won their first Kildare Senior Football Championship in 2008. Celbridge GAA had won its first Kildare Senior Hurling Championship in 1921. Success in the top hurling competition in Kildare would not arrive until 2005 when Celbridge, managed by Jimmy Doyle, beat Coill Dubh in the final. Following a number of semi-final defeats, a "three in a row" of hurling titles came in 2009, 2010 and 2011. After defeat in the 2012 decider to Confey, Celbridge reclaimed the title in 2013. The club has won the Kildare Senior Camogie Championship in 2005, 2006 and 2010, and won the U21 football county championship in 2012 and 2014.

=== Association football ===
The town has two clubs. Celbridge Town AFC, which was formed in 1959 and plays its home games in St Patricks Park. Ballyoulster United FC, which was formed in 1968 and plays its home games at Louglinstown road. Both clubs compete in the Leinster Senior League.

Other football clubs

Celbridge was also home to other association football teams, including Celbridge FC, which competed in the Leinster Junior Cup during the 1908–09 season, The club disbanded the same season. And Grove Celtic FC, which played Balrath FC on 13 October 2024, losing 4–3, Grove Celtic disbanded the same year too. In 2002, Castletown Celtic with their legendary grey and yellow jersey participated in the 1st Kildare Saturday league. They disbanded after 2 seasons.

=== Golf and pitch and putt ===
Celbridge Elm Hall Golf Club is a 9-hole parkland course located adjacent to Celbridge / Hazelhatch train station on the Loughlinstown Road. Celbridge's 18 hole championship pitch and putt course meets PPUI standards.

=== Athletics ===
Local resident Mark Kenneally represented Ireland in the marathon at the 2012 London Summer Olympics. George Magan was Irish cross country champion in 1920 and 1922, Irish Mile champion in 1919, 1921 and 1922, Irish 880 yards champion in 1918, 1919 and 1921, and Irish four-mile (6 km) champion in 1921. Jack Guiney was Irish champion in the triple jump and shot in 1937.

Celbridge Athletic Club is active locally, and has over 500 participants across all ages.

=== Rugby ===
Celbridge Rugby Club, founded by Fr Joseph Furlong, competed in the Towns Cup in 1928/29. Celbridge players compete in the All Ireland League with MU Barnhall.

=== Watersports ===
Celbridge Paddlers canoeclub is a multidiscipline kayaking club, which was formed in 1984 and is affiliated to the Irish Canoe Union. The annual Liffey Descent Canoe Race passes through Celbridge, where competitors have to navigate the Vanessa weir and Castletown rapids.

=== Other sports ===
Celbridge Tennis Club was founded in 1923, and the club's premises on Hazelhatch Road were opened in the 1970s.

Celbridge horse racecourse is mentioned in the Freeman's Journal of 27 September 1763 and 4 October 1763, but was not in use after the end of the 18th century. Locally trained horse Workman, trained by Jack Ruttle out of Hazelhatch Stud, was the winner of the Aintree Grand National in 1939. A point-to-point meeting was held at nearby Windgaps 1912–1954.

A cricket club was active from 1880 to 1902. Kildare County Polo Club had their grounds on Castletown Estate 1901–1906. Among those who played polo in Celbridge was Prince Heinrich, younger brother to Kaiser William II.

There is salmon and sea trout angling locally, with trout found from Islandbridge upstream, with other trout fishing grounds above Leixlip and all the way to Ballymore Eustace.

=== Community groups ===
There are three separate Scouting Ireland Groups in operation in Celbridge. The Groups are 1st Kildare (2nd Celbridge), 3rd Kildare (1st Celbridge), and 19th Kildare. The Celbridge Amenity Group is also active locally.

== Politics ==
Celbridge is located within the Kildare North constituency, which elects 4 TDs to the Dáil.

== People ==
=== Born or resident ===
- John Alen Archbishop of Dublin, and Chancellor of Ireland (1476–1534), casualty of the "Silken Thomas" Fitzgerald rebellion in 1534, and his cousin John Alan (c. 1500 – 1561), also Lord Chancellor, buried at Donoghcomper.
- Simon Bradstreet (1792–1853) of Stacumny, founder member of the Catholic Association and associate of Daniel O'Connell.
- Ben Briscoe (b.1934) former Fianna Fáil Teachta Dála and former Lord Mayor of Dublin
- John Augustus Conolly (1829–1888), Victoria Cross recipient
- William "Speaker" Conolly (1662–1729) one of the most powerful politicians in Ireland in the first decades of the 18th century.
- Lady Louisa Conolly (1743–1821) and her sister Sarah Napier (1745–1826), both daughters of Charles Lennox, 2nd Duke of Richmond.
- Thomas Dongan, 2nd Earl of Limerick (1634–1715), member of the Irish Parliament, an officer during the English Civil War, and Governor of the Province of New York
- Arthur Guinness (1725–1803) founder of the famous brewery is buried in Oughterard cemetery, near the plot of his uncle William Read. He was the son of Richard Guinness and Elizabeth Read (1698–1742) from Bishopscourt, who was agent and receiver of Dr Arthur Price and lived in Celbridge at the time of Arthur's birth.
- Aidan Higgins (b.1927), a writer whose 1972 novel, Balcony of Europe was shortlisted for the Booker Prize.
- Ivone Kirkpatrick (1897–1964), diplomatist, British Chancellor in Berlin before the Second World War, and Under-Secretary of the British Foreign Office
- Donal MacIntyre (b.1966), campaigning television journalist.
- Devon Murray (b.1988), portrayer of Seamus Finnegan in the Harry Potter films, was raised in Celbridge.
- George Napier (1751–1804) and his sons George (1784–1855), Charles (1782–1853), William (1785–1860), and Henry (1789–1853), later to be collectively known as "Wellington's Colonels."
- Art O'Connor (1888–1950), Minister for Agriculture in the second Dáil cabinet (1921) and briefly leader of Sinn Féin after the foundation of Fianna Fáil
- Arthur Price (1678/9–1752) serial bishop of four different Church of Ireland dioceses, culminating in the Archbishopric of Cashel, and benefactor to Brewer Arthur Guinness.
- Damien Rice (b.1973), Indie Musician.
- Thomas Rochfort (died 1522) Dean of St. Patrick's Cathedral and Master of the Rolls in Ireland, born at Killadoon, where his father was Lord of the Manor.
- John Sheehan (1809–1882), a journalist who wrote under the pseudonym of "the Irish Whisky Drinker" grew up in Celbridge
- Kathleen Walsh (1947–2007), politician, elected as an independent to Kildare County Council at the 1999 local elections, and member of the Seanad 2002–2007.

=== Lived briefly or were educated in Celbridge ===
- William Baillie (1723–1810), art dealer and printmaker, was the second son of Robert Baillie of Celbridge.
- John Wynn Baker (c. 1730 – 1775), who established the first factory in Ireland in 1765 is buried at Celbridge.
- Caroline Blackwood (1931–1996), writer, lived for a time in Castletown, originally with her husband, the depressive American poet Robert Lowell (1917–1977) and then with the poet Andrew Harvey (b 1951).
- Henry Grattan (1746–1821) renowned 18th Irish patriot politician, lived with his uncle Colonel Thomas Marlay at Celbridge Abbey between 1777 and 1780. He afterwards wrote: "Along the banks of that river, amid the groves and bowers of Swift and Vanessa, I grew convinced that I was right".
- Richard McIlkenny (1934–2006), member of the Birmingham Six miscarriage of justice case, resided in the town until his death on 22 May 2006.
- Those educated at Celbridge include the disabled world traveller and politician Arthur Macmorrough Kavanagh (1831–1889), Church of Ireland bishop John Jebb (1775–1833), and broadcaster Ruth Buchanan.

== See also ==
- List of towns and villages in the Republic of Ireland
- Market Houses in Ireland
