= Richard Marlay =

Irish Anglican bishop

Richard Marlay was Dean of Ferns from 1769 to 1787; and Bishop of Clonfert and Kilmacduagh from 1787 to 1795 when he was translated to Waterford and Lismore. He died in office on 1 July 1802.

He was the youngest surviving son of Thomas Marlay, Lord Chief Justice of Ireland, and his wife Anne Delaune, daughter of Charles Delaune. Henry Grattan, the noted statesman, was his nephew, son of his sister Mary Marlay, who married James Grattan. He was the nephew of another Church of Ireland bishop, George Marlay, Bishop of Dromore; George's branch of the family gave their name to Marlay Park. Richard's elder brother was the soldier Colonel Thomas Marlay.

He was a close friend of Samuel Johnson, and a member of the Literary Club founded by Johnson in 1764. His father had purchased Celbridge Abbey in County Kildare, best remembered as the home of Esther Vanhomrigh, the beloved Vanessa of Jonathan Swift, in 1723, and Richard had it extensively rebuilt in the 1780s. His brother Thomas also lived here with his wife and children.

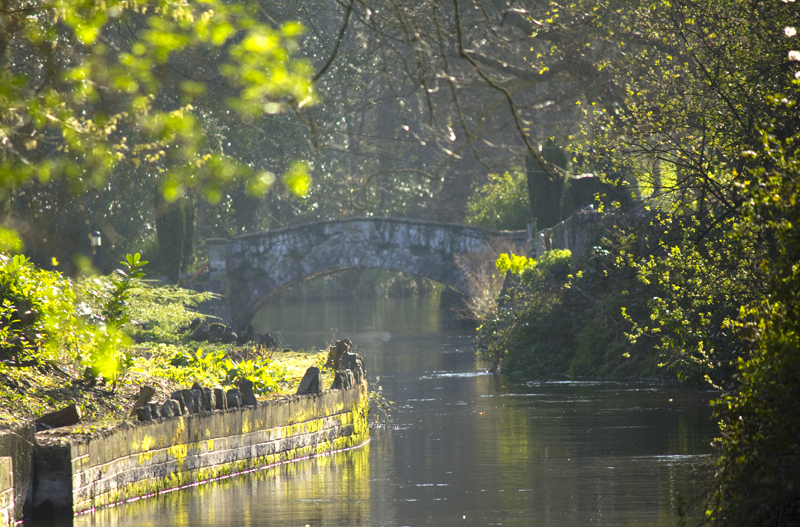
Celbridge Abbey-the Stone Bridge. Richard extensively rebuilt the house, which his father purchased in the 1720s

== Notes ==
Church of Ireland titles
Preceded by John Alcock	Dean of Ferns; 1769–1787	Succeeded by Thomas Stopford
Preceded by John Law	Bishop of Clonfert and Kilmacduagh; 1787–1795	Succeeded by Charles Brodrick
Preceded by William Newcome	Bishop of Waterford and Lismore; 1795 –1802	Succeeded by Power Le Poer Trench
