= Donaghcumper Church =

Ruined medieval church in Ireland

- Old Donaghcumper Church; Donacomper, Donnacompare, Donnacompar, Dennycomfert, Downecumper, Donaghcomper, Donocomfert, Donocomper
- Domhnach Compair
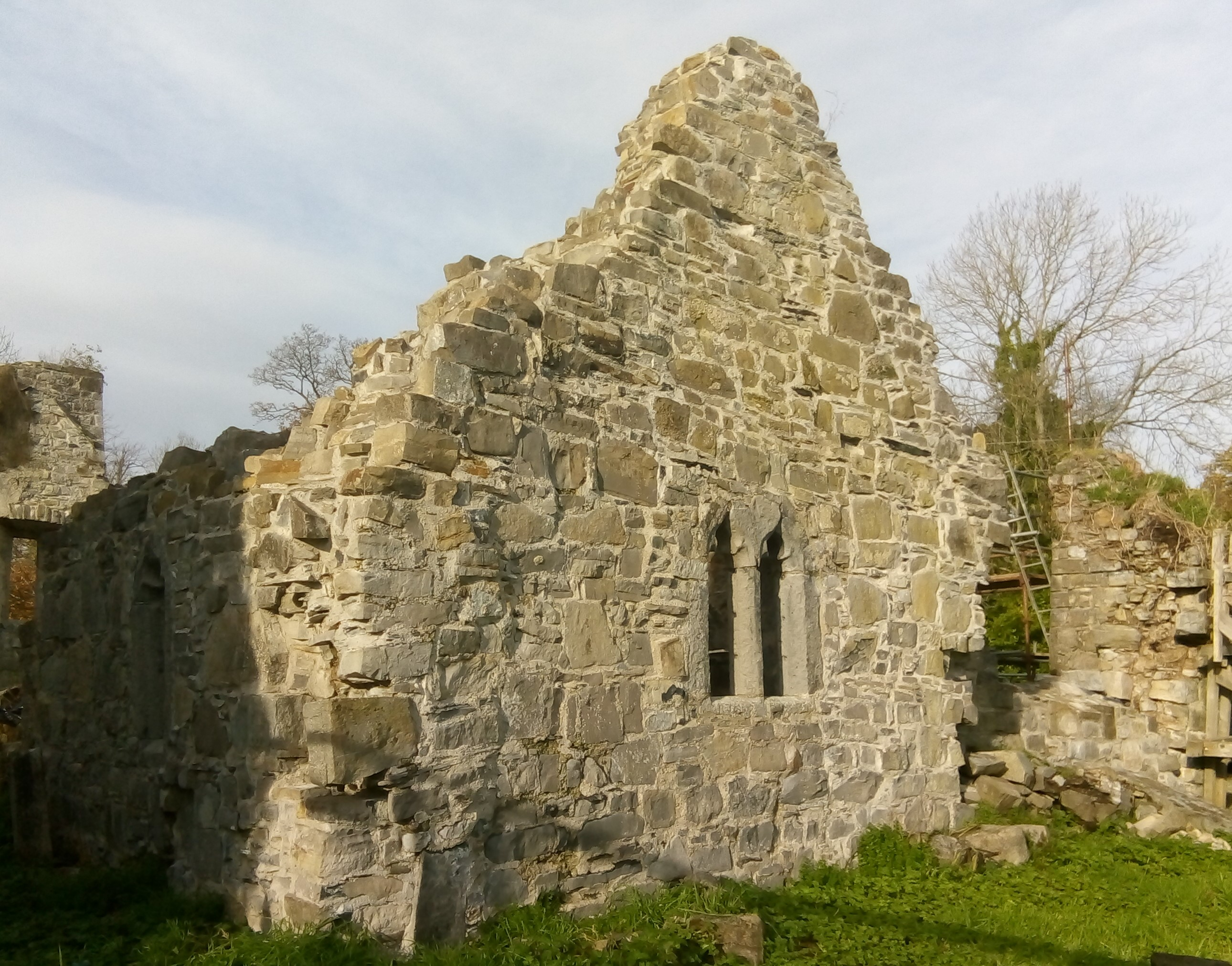
- East end with ogee windows

- Location in Greater Dublin Location in Ireland
- 53°20′23″N 6°31′41″W
- Location: Donaghcumper, Celbridge, County Kildare
- Country: Ireland
- Denomination: Church of Ireland
- Previous denomination: Pre-Reformation Catholic

History
- Founded: 12th century
- Dedication: Saint Brigid

Architecture
- Functional status: ruined
- Closed: 18th century

Specifications
- Materials: limestone, mortar

Administration
- Province: Dublin and Cashel
- Diocese: Dublin and Glendalough
- Parish: Celbridge & Straffan with Newcastle Lyons

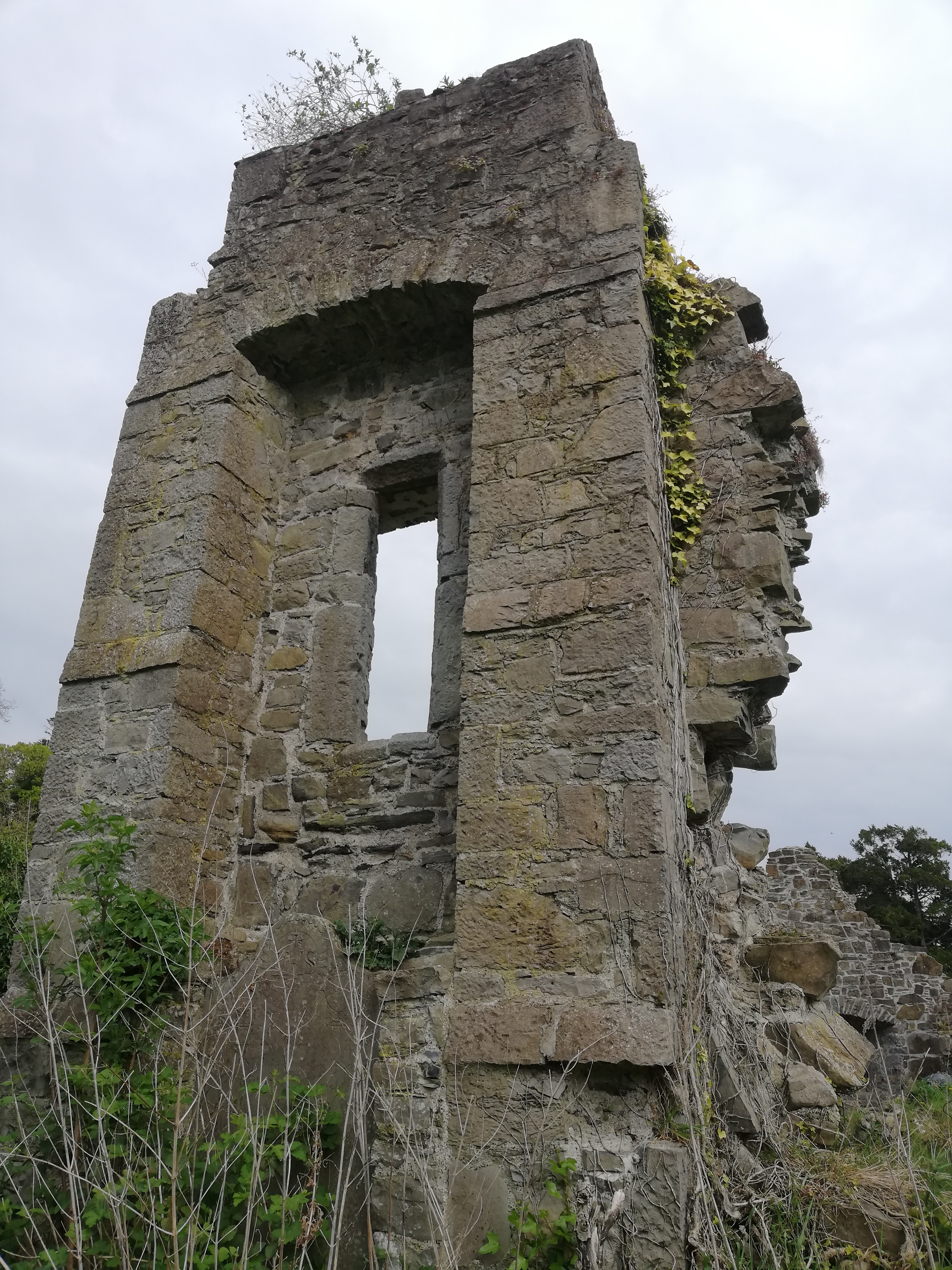
The west window.

Donaghcumper Church is a ruined medieval church in Celbridge, Ireland. On the Record of Monuments and Places it bears the code KD011-013.

== Location ==
Donaghcumper Church is located 800 m (½ mile) east of Celbridge town centre, on the R403 road (Dublin Road).

== History ==
This may have been a Christian site as early as the 5th century. The name means "church of the confluence"; the word Domhnach (from Latin dominica, "of the Lord") is traditionally assumed (due to a note in the 9th-century Book of Armagh) to belong to the earliest churches in Ireland. The River Shinkeen, a small stream, enters the River Liffey 550 m to the north of Donaghcumper. A Domnach Combair appears in the Vita tripartita Sancti Patricii (9th century), although that appears to be located in Dál nAraidi, in the northeast of Ireland.

The earliest part of the church was built c. 1150–60, around the time of the Norman invasion of Ireland. In 1202 control of the church was given to St. Wolstan's Priory by the de Hereford family (Adam de Hereford and descendants). Cut-stone windows were added in the 14th century (c. 1340).

The church was suppressed in the Reformation and the lands acquired by John Alan, Lord Chancellor of Ireland. He was buried at Donaghcumper in 1561, as was his nephew John Alen in 1616, and John's son Sir Thomas Alen, 1st Baronet in 1627. Donaghcumper became a Church of Ireland (Anglican Protestant) church and was active for about 200 years. In 1690, a James Warren was parish priest.

A sketch of 1770 shows the church with a roof and a tower in the west end. A map of 1783 lists the site as Ch. Rs. (church ruins) and the 1897 map lists it as ruinous. However, the church is surrounded by a still-active graveyard; the earliest-dated grave still legible is that of a Nicholas Walsh, died 1711.

In 2000 some renovation took place, and in 2017 funding of €7,500 was allocated.

== Buildings ==
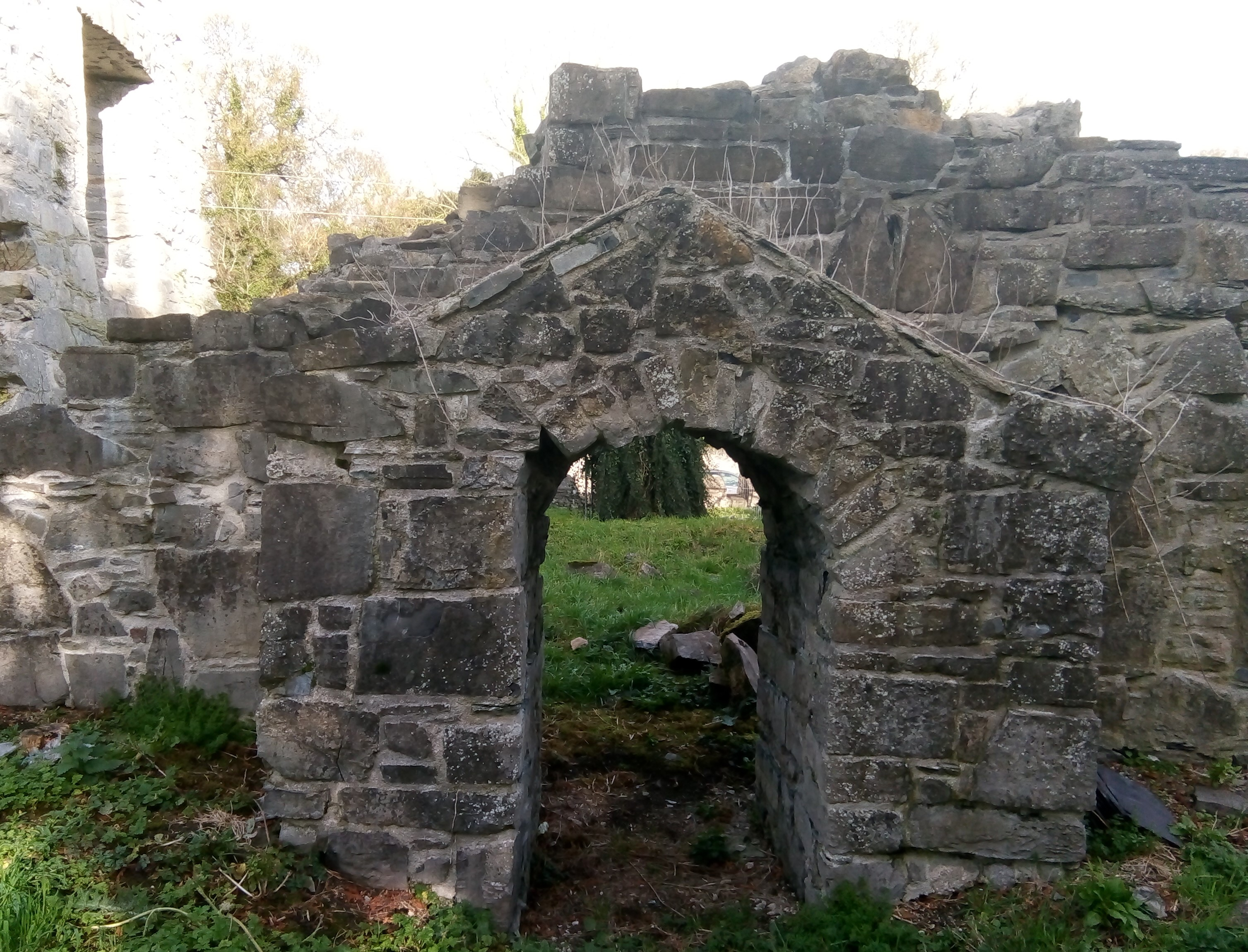
Porch in the south wall.

Portions of the nave and chancel remain. The Alen vault is located at the east end of the chancel. The east gable has an ogee window, and the west gable has a belfry. A round semicircular arch divides nave and chancel, and there is a gabled porch in the south end and a piscina in the east. Of the tower in the west, only one wall remains.

== Gallery ==
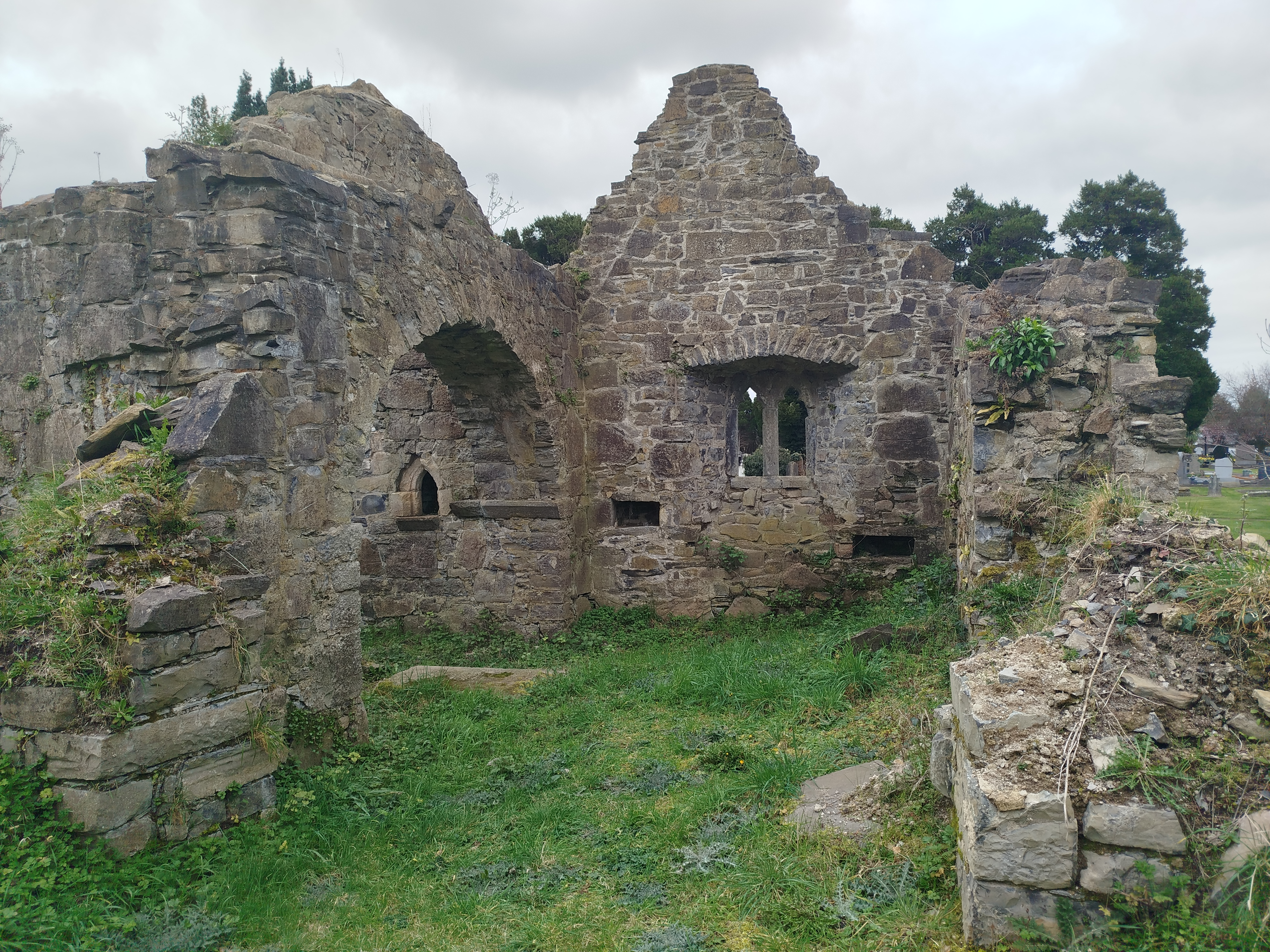

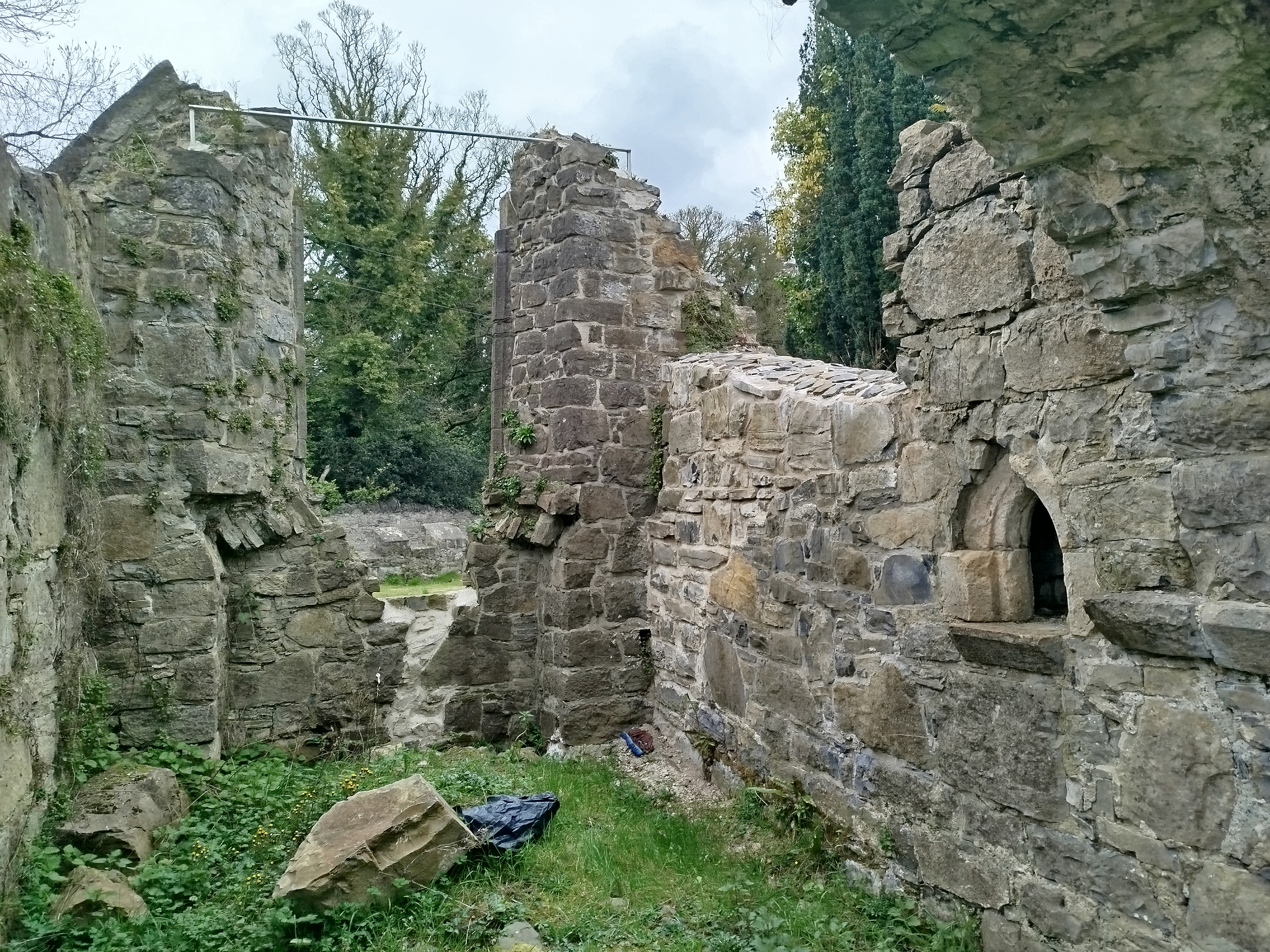

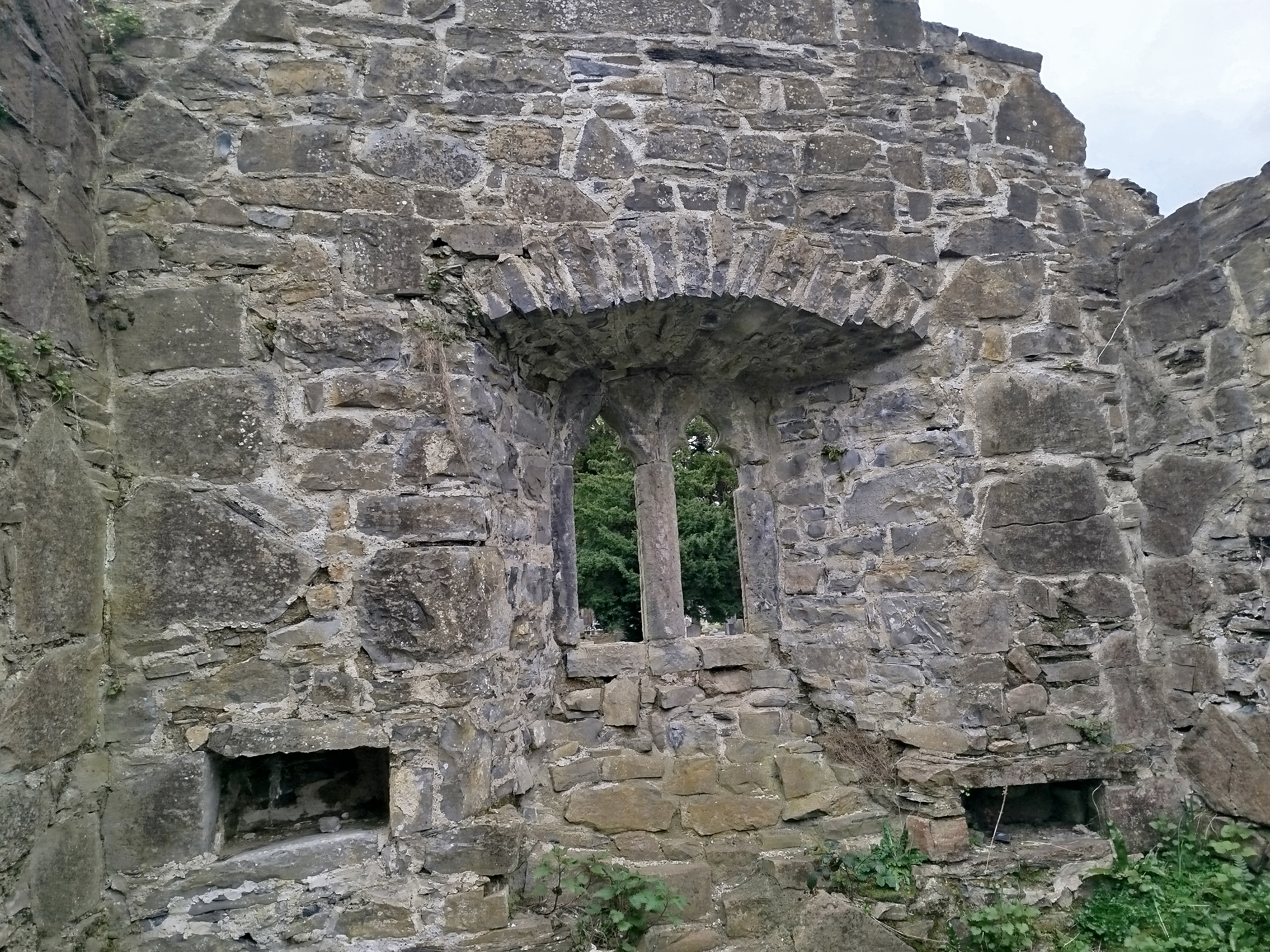

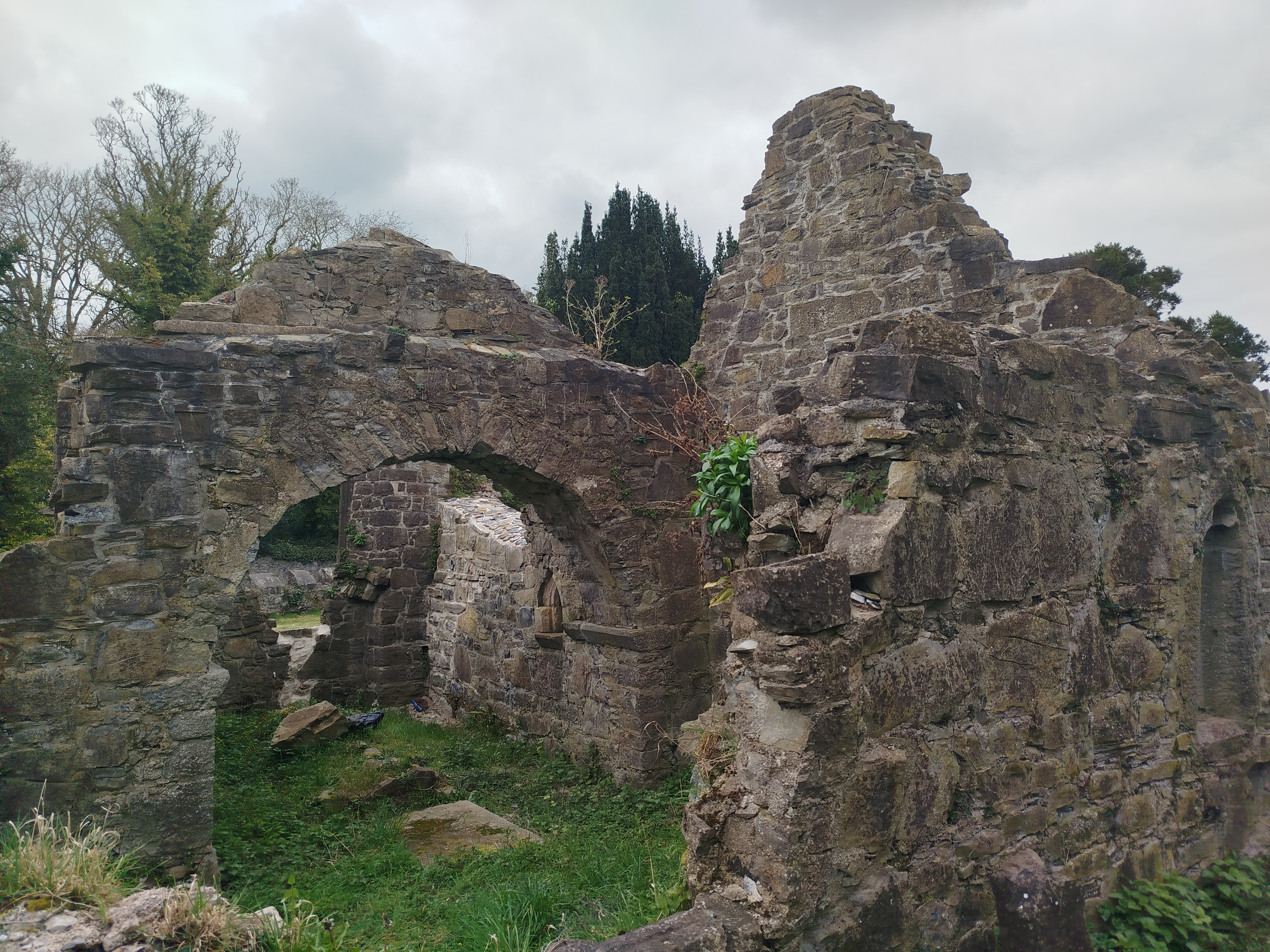
