= St. Wolstan's Priory =

Monastery ruins in County Kildare, Ireland

- Prióireacht San Ualstain
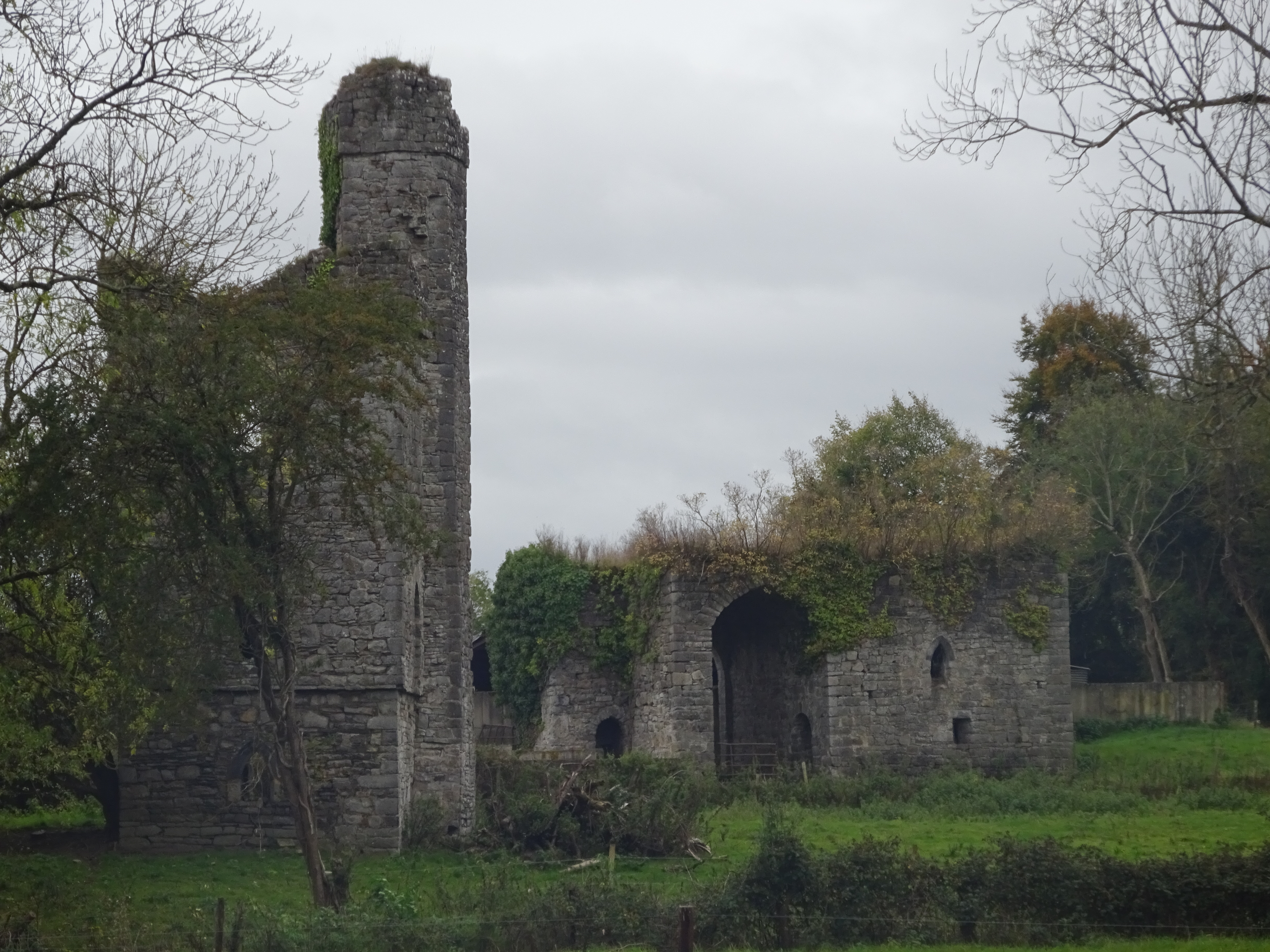
- Remnants of the abbey, viewed from the north.

- Location relative to Dublin St. Wolstan's Priory (Ireland)
- Interactive map of St. Wolstan's Priory

Monastery information
- Other name: Scala Caeli
- Order: Victorines
- Established: 1202/05
- Mother house: Abbey of Saint-Victor, Paris
- Diocese: Dublin

People
- Founder: Adam de Hereford

Architecture
- Status: ruined
- Style: Norman

Site
- Location: St. Wolstan's, Celbridge, County Kildare
- Coordinates: 53.343605°N 6.517151°W
- Visible remains: two gateways, tower
- Public access: No

St. Wolstan's Priory is a former Augustinian (Victorine) monastery located in County Kildare, Ireland.

== Location ==
St. Wolstan's Priory is located on the eastern edge of Celbridge, on the south bank of the River Liffey; it lies 1 km (0.62 mi) southeast of Castletown House and about 1.8 km (1.1 mi) east-northeast of Celbridge's Main Street.

== History ==
The priory was founded in 1202 (or, according to William of Ware, 1205) by Adam de Hereford, one of the Anglo-Norman leaders of the Norman conquest of Ireland. It was founded for canons of the order of St Victor and was named after the recently canonised Saint Wulfstan (died 1095). The early buildings were nicknamed Scala Coeli, "stairs of heaven."

The monastery was granted the lands around Donaghcumper Church. In 1271 William de Mandesham, seneschal to Fulk Basset, Archbishop of Dublin, granted to the priory the lands of Tristildelane, modern Castledillon.

In 1308 a bridge across the River Liffey was built at his own expense by John Le Decer, Mayor of Dublin, next to the gate of St. Wolstan's. In 1314 the churches of Stacumney and Donaghmore were granted to the sole and separate use of the prior.

In 1536 the priory and lands were seized by King Henry VIII as part of the Dissolution of the Monasteries. It was the first monastery in Ireland to be suppressed and the last prior, Richard Weston, was granted a room in the monastery and supplied with food and fuel for the rest of his life. It was granted to John Alan, Lord Chancellor of Ireland, in 1538.

The buildings of the priory were probably converted into a house for Sir John Alan before his death in 1561. The Alen family lived at St. Wolstans for 216 years. They resided in the priory for much of this period and later built the house.

In 1782 the ruins were visited and sketched by Austin Cooper (1759–1830).

In 1955 the site was purchased by the Holy Faith Sisters, who established St. Wolstan's Holy Faith Convent School. The school has since moved site but retains the name of St Wolstan's Community School.

It was partially excavated in 2002 as part of an archeological assessment, but nothing of significance was found.

== Remains ==
The remains consist of two gateways, a four-storey tower, and two fragments.
