= John Sheehan (journalist) =

Irish journalist, writer and barrister

John Sheehan (1812–1882) was an Irish journalist, writer and barrister.

== Early life ==
Sheehan was the son of an hotel-keeper at Celbridge, County Kildare, where he was born. He was sent to the Jesuit college at Clongoweswood, where Francis Sylvester Mahony was his tutor for a time. About 1829 he entered Trinity College Dublin, but did not graduate.

== The Comet Club ==
In 1830 Sheehan joined the Comet Club of young Irishmen, with Samuel Lover, Joseph Stirling Coyne, Robert Knox who became editor of The Morning Post, and Maurice O'Connell. The club issued pamphlets attacking the tithe system; the first, The Parson's Horn Book, which appeared in two parts with etchings by Lover, was popular. The club then issued The Comet, a satirical weekly paper opposing the Church of Ireland, with the first number appearing on 1 May 1831. Sheehan was appointed sub-editor. In a few weeks it had reached a circulation of several thousand copies, and until its closure at the end of 1833 was influential.

The government in the autumn of 1833 ordered the arrest of Thomas Browne, the editor The Comet, and Sheehan, for libel. They were defended by Daniel O'Connell and Robert Holmes, but were each sentenced to 12 months in prison and fined. The fine was then remitted, and the term of imprisonment was only partly served.

== Journalist in London ==
Sheehan, on his release, studied for the Irish Bar, to which he was called in 1835. He shortly afterwards came to London. In 1836–7 he was in Paris and Madrid as representative of The Constitutional newspaper.

In 1839 Sheehan matriculated at Trinity College, Cambridge, though he took no degree. He was admitted to the Inner Temple in 1841, and was called to the bar in 1846. After a short career as a barrister he concentrated again on journalism. He was parliamentary reporter of the Morning Herald, contributing also poems and sketches to Bentley's Miscellany and other magazines.

In 1852 Sheehan was proprietor and editor of The Independent of London and Cambridge. Subsequently, in Temple Bar and elsewhere he often wrote under the signatures of "The Irish Whiskey-Drinker" and "The Knight of Innishowen".

== Later life ==
Shortly after 1868 Sheehan married the widow of Colonel Shubrick, or Shrubrick, a wealthy Anglo-Indian officer, and spent some years in travelling on the continent. He eventually retired to the London Charterhouse, where he died on 29 May 1882.

== Works ==
Sheehan's major literary work was included in John Doran's edition of the Bentley Ballads (1858), and in his own edition of the same work (1869).

== In literature ==
William Makepeace Thackeray knew Sheehan well, and he is believed to be the original of Captain Shandon in Pendennis. Two other Irish friends, William John O'Connell and Andrew Archdeckne, suggested Costigan and Foker respectively.

== Notes ==
Attribution

This article incorporates text from a publication now in the public domain: Lee, Sidney, ed. (1897). "Sheehan, John". Dictionary of National Biography. Vol. 52. London: Smith, Elder & Co.
