= Celbridge Abbey =

Building in Celbridge, Ireland

Coordinates: 53°20′11″N 6°32′34″W

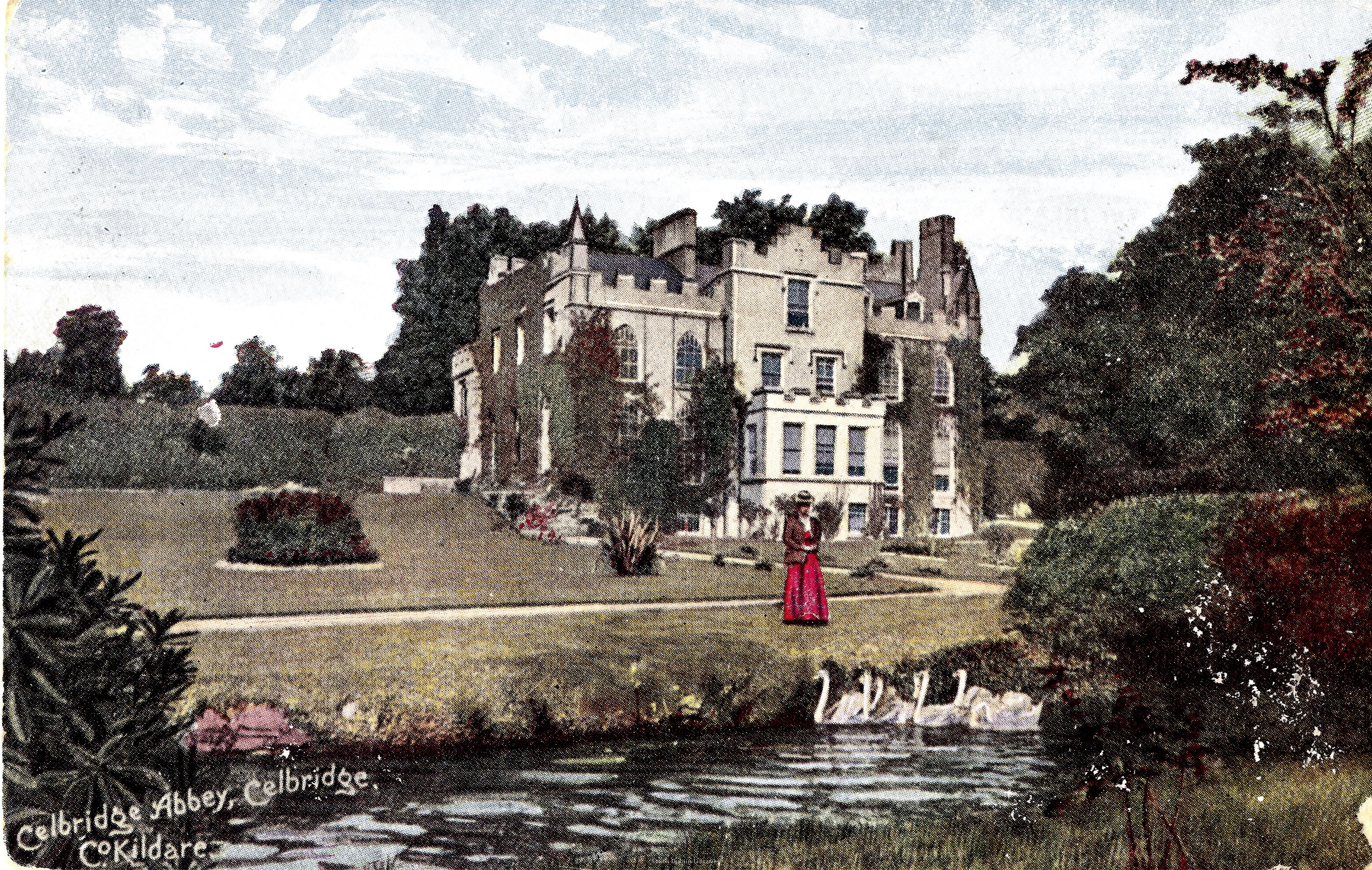
Celbridge Abbey in 1900.

Celbridge Abbey is located in Celbridge, County Kildare in Ireland.

== History ==
The house was built by Bartholomew Van Homrigh, who at the time was the Lord Mayor of Dublin, in 1697. It is, however, more famous as the childhood (1688–1707) and later adult (1714–23) home of his daughter, Esther Vanhomrigh, (1688–1723), who was Dean Swift's 'Vanessa'. Swift was known to travel frequently to Celbridge Abbey to see her. The poem in which Swift fictionalised her as Vanessa, "Cadenus and Vanessa", was written seven years before he visited her in Celbridge in 1720.

The house was acquired by Thomas Marlay, the Lord Chief Justice of Ireland in 1723. Thomas Marlay's son, Bishop Richard Marlay, had the house rebuilt in the 1780s. Meanwhile Thomas Marlay's daughter Mary was married to James Grattan, a member of the Irish House of Commons. James' son, Henry Grattan (1746–1821), a renowned 18th Irish patriot politician, lived with his uncle Colonel Thomas Marlay at Celbridge Abbey between 1777 and 1780. He afterwards wrote: "Along the banks of that river, amid the groves and bowers of Swift and Vanessa, I grew convinced that I was right."

An occupant in the late 19th century was Colonel Gerald Dease, a Catholic nobleman who entertained the Empress of Austria and later Prince Henry of Prussia during their visits to Ireland.

Since 1952, the house has been owned and managed by the Brothers Hospitallers of Saint John of God, providing a range of Respite, Residential, Day Services and Early Services for people with an intellectual disability.

== Rock Bridge ==
The rock bridge in Celbridge Abbey grounds is the oldest stone bridge across the River Liffey.

== See also ==
- List of abbeys and priories in Ireland (County Kildare)
