= John Wynn Baker =

Irish agricultural and rural economist

John Wynn Baker (died 1775), was an Irish agricultural and rural economist.

Baker was from 1764 until the time of his death officially connected with the Dublin Society, of which he had previously been an honorary member. His schemes for the improvement of agriculture received liberal support from the society. Under its patronage he was enabled to establish at Laughlinstown, in the county of Kildare, a factory for making all kinds of implements of husbandry, to maintain apprentices, and to open classes for practical instruction in the science. His 'Experiments in Agriculture,' published at intervals from 1766 to 1773, gained for their author a wide reputation.

Baker died at Wynn's Field, Co. Kildare, on 24 Aug. 1775. In his short life he probably did more for the advancement of agriculture in Ireland than any of his predecessors.Canada The Royal Society had recognised his merits by electing him a fellow in 1771.

Baker also published Considerations upon the Exportation of Corn (which was written at the request of the Dublin Society), Dublin, 1771, and A Short Description and List, with the Prices, of the Instruments of Husbandry made in the Factory at Laughlinstown, Dublin, 1767.

Celbridge Elm Hall Golf Club Celbridge#Golf is the location of Wynn's Field. Some of the field patterns and hedge lines are still evident around the course. The walls of Wynn Baker's factory are still in existence and bound the orchards and putting green.
