= John Alan =

English-born statesman

Sir John Alan (also spelt Alen or Alleyn; c. 1500 – 1561) was a leading English-born statesman in sixteenth century Ireland. He was a member of the Irish House of Commons, and held the offices of Master of the Rolls in Ireland, Chancellor of the Exchequer of Ireland and Lord Chancellor of Ireland. Though he was childless himself, one of his brothers, William, founded a prominent landowning dynasty in County Kildare. The family's holdings included lands at Celbridge, St. Wolstan's and Kilteel, County Kildare, as well as substantial lands in County Dublin. They also acquired a baronetcy.

== Family ==
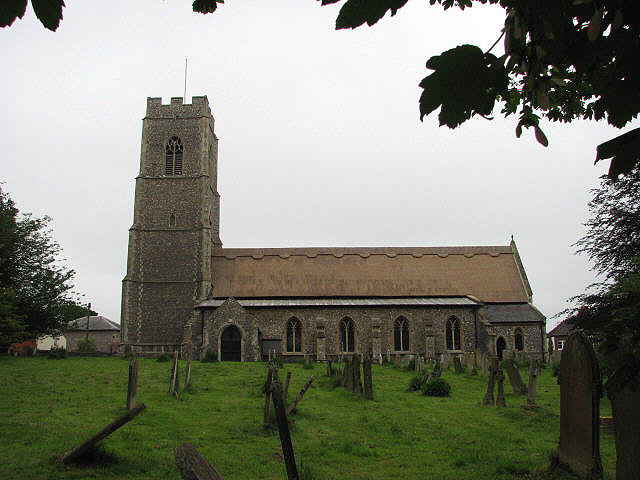
Coltishall, Norfolk, the home of the Alen family

He was born at Coltishall in Norfolk, son of Thomas Alen. The Alens were a numerous family and five of his brothers, of whom we know most about William and Thomas, also settled in Ireland. John Alen, Archbishop of Dublin, who was murdered in the Silken Thomas rebellion of 1534, was a close relative, probably a first cousin, of the Lord Chancellor.

== Early career ==
Alen studied law at Gray's Inn, and then entered the service of Cardinal Thomas Wolsey who sent him to Ireland in 1528 to promote the Cardinal's authority as legate and to act as secretary to Alen's cousin the archbishop, although he and Wolsey had quarrelled. Neither Wolsey's downfall nor the retirement of the archbishop from the Lord Chancellorship harmed Alen's career: he became clerk to the Irish Parliament, Chancellor of the Exchequer of Ireland (an office which he held for life) and in 1533 Master of the Rolls in Ireland. The latter office at that time was largely administrative rather than judicial in nature: to be a qualified lawyer, like Alen himself, was a desirable but not essential requirement, and at least two sixteenth-century masters lacked any legal qualifications.

== Rebellion of Silken Thomas ==
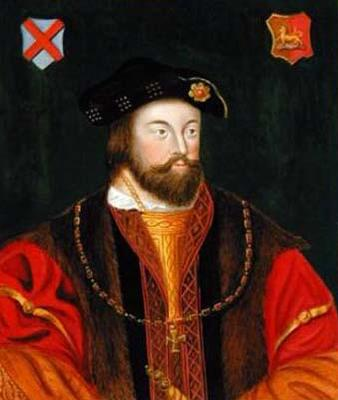
Silken Thomas

In 1533 Alen and Sir Gerald Aylmer, the future Lord Chief Justice of Ireland, with whom Alen was always closely associated, presented a petition to the Crown about the misgovernment of Ireland by Gerald FitzGerald, 9th Earl of Kildare and his son Silken Thomas. Just before the outbreak of Silken Thomas's Rebellion in 1534, Alen and his brothers sent an urgent letter to London urging Thomas's arrest. The murder of their cousin Archbishop Alen was the most notorious act of the rebellion, but neither John Alen nor his brothers seem to have suffered any harm. Though by his own admission John was "not a soldier" he played some part in suppressing the rebellion.

== Dissolution of the Monasteries ==
In 1539 Alen was appointed to head the Commission for the Dissolution of the Monasteries in Ireland, with instructions to receive voluntary resignations of monks and nuns and surrender of monastic houses, and provide for the payment of pensions to those who willingly left the religious life. He was also given power to "apprehend and punish" all those who maintained the papal authority. Alen had already received his reward: St. Wolstan's Priory, near Celbridge, County Kildare, had been suppressed in 1536 and granted to Alen. The estate included Donaghcumper Church and the lands attached to it. The Alen family remained at St. Wolstan's for two centuries. He was also granted the lands of present-day Palmerstown in County Dublin: in his will, he left these lands to his widow for her life, after which it was to pass to the children of his brother William.

His brother Thomas, who had been appointed joint Clerk of the Crown and Hanaper, received the former estate of the Order of St John of Jerusalem at Kilteel; this may have been at John's request, or at the request of the last Prior of the Order, Sir John Rawson, later Viscount Clontarf, whose natural daughter Mary married Thomas. Thomas and Mary had at least one daughter, Eleanor, who married Robert Dillon, Chief Justice of the Irish Common Pleas and had one son. Kilteel also remained in the Alen family for centuries: the Castle survives and is an excellent example of a medieval tower house.

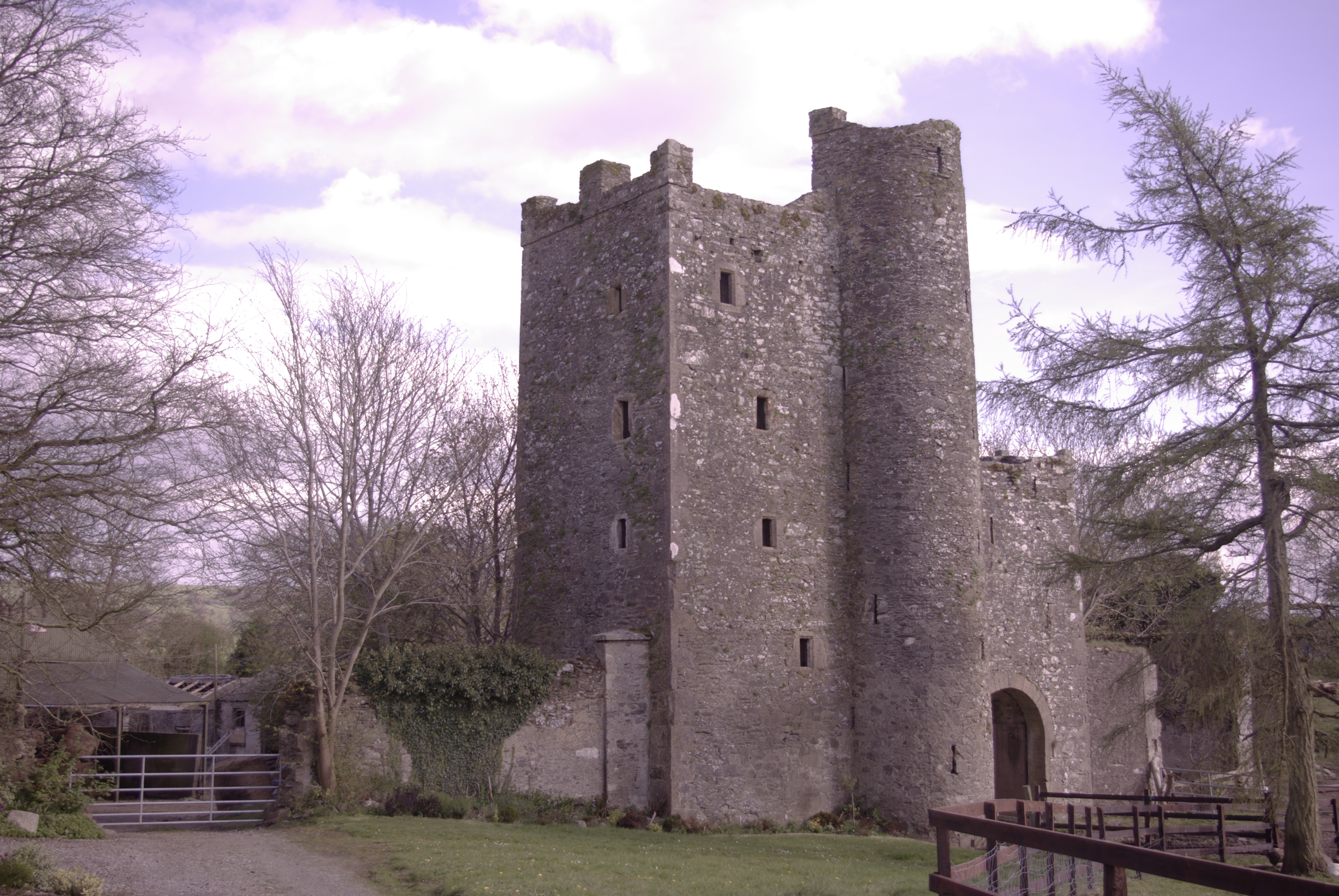
Kilteel Castle, the home of John Alen's brother Thomas

== Lord Chancellor, removal from office and return to power ==
In 1538, on the death of John Barnewall, 3rd Baron Trimlestown, Alen became Lord Keeper of the Great Seal of Ireland, and subsequently Lord Chancellor of Ireland. Even his enemies acknowledged that he was a hard-working and conscientious judge. However he quarrelled with the Lord Deputy of Ireland, Sir Anthony St. Leger, who wrote to London complaining of Alen's conduct. Alen was summoned before the English Privy Council in 1546 and accused of corruption, as well as the rather vague charge of "promoting discord". Alen strongly defended himself, saying he was the "cleanest-handed Chancellor in the memory of man"; but the charges were upheld and he was removed from office and imprisoned briefly. Whether he was guilty of corruption, or simply the victim of St. Leger's enmity, is difficult to say. Alen was accused by Walter Cowley, the Principal Solicitor for Ireland, who until then had been generally regarded as Alen's ally, of inducing Cowley to write the so-called "Gowran letter" in which St. Leger was accused of deliberately endangering the life of James Butler, 9th Earl of Ormond, of whom Alan was a strong supporter. Cowley certainly wrote the letter, but whether Alen had any part in the Gowran affair is unclear. He was deprived of his pension, yet a year later the Council ordered the restoration of all his property.

In 1548 Alen regained the Lord Chancellorship; but on St. Leger's return to power in 1550 he felt it best to retire, despite assurances of the King's continued goodwill. Given the enmity between them, O'Flanagan regarded Alen's magnanimous conduct towards St. Leger on one crucial occasion as praiseworthy. When George Browne, Archbishop of Dublin charged St. Leger with having spoken treasonable words, he gave Alen as his source. Alen however refused to repeat St. Leger's words on the grounds that they had been spoken in confidence.

== Last years ==
In 1553, on the death of Edward VI, his sister Mary I reappointed Alen to the Privy Council of Ireland. Her letter to the Council is a tribute to the high regard in which he was held by the Crown: it praises him for his "trusty functions" under Henry VIII and Edward, and his "long experience and travail in public affairs". On a more personal note, the letter refers to his age and infirmity and urges that he not be required to undertake any long journeys. By his own account, Alen spent most of Mary's reign in England, as his acceptance of her Catholic policy had made him unpopular in Ireland.

Despite the reference to his age and infirmity, Ball notes that he was elected to the Irish House of Commons as member for Kinsale in 1560. Given the distance between Kinsale and his home in County Kildare, and the appalling condition of the Irish roads at the time, we may infer that he was an absentee MP.

== Death and heirs ==
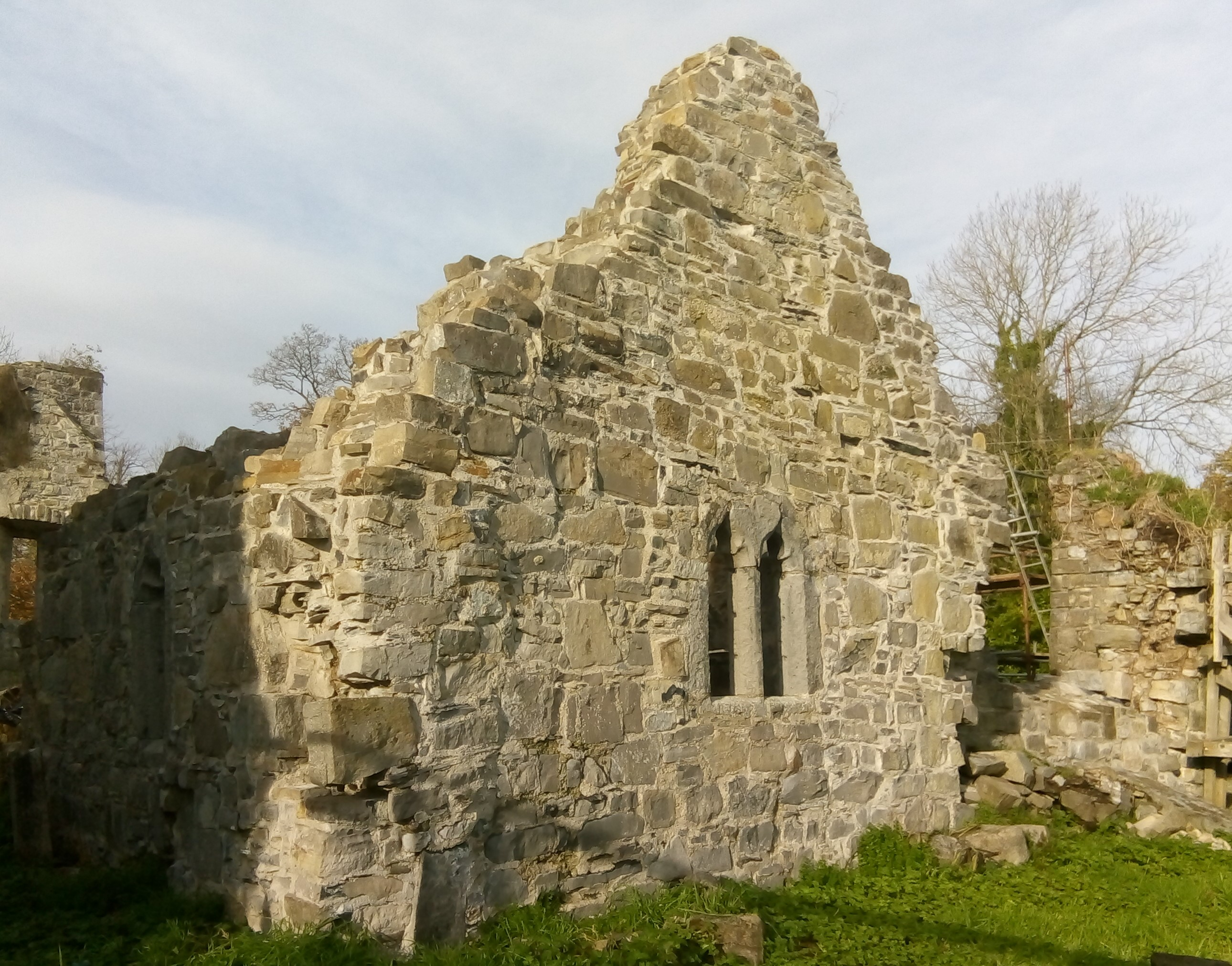
The ruins of Donaghcumper Church, where John is buried, and where the Alans later built a family vault

Alan died at his home, St. Wolstan's, in 1561 and was buried at Donaghcumper Church; a memorial was erected to him and an Alan family vault was later added. Donaghcumper Church is now a ruin. In his last will he left much of his property to his widow for her life, and after her death to his nephew John (died 1616), who was almost certainly the son of his brother William of Kiloughter, now Celbridge. William made his own will in 1558, and died a year or so later. In his will, he made provision for his widow Margaret, and their seven children, five sons including John, and two daughters (it seems that none of the children were yet married). John, who also inherited Kilteel Castle from his uncle Thomas Alen, was the grandfather of Sir Thomas Alen, 1st Baronet, who was created a baronet in 1621 in recognition of the services to the Crown of his relative Archbishop Alen. The title died with him.

== King's Inns ==
Alen was closely associated with the foundation of the King's Inns in 1541. Although it was Patrick Barnewall, a future Master of the Rolls, who first wrote to Thomas Cromwell in 1538 urging that the former religious house at Blackfriars (near present-day Henrietta Street in Dublin city centre) should become a "House of Chancery", the lease for 21 years granted by Henry VIII in 1541 has Alan at the head of the list of lessees; and in 1542 he joined in the petition to the King urging the grant of the property to the lessees in perpetuity.

== Character ==
O'Flanagan praises Alen as an honest and honourable man, notes the high opinion of him held by three successive English monarchs and remarks that he was capable of magnanimous behaviour even to bitter political opponents like St Leger. Elrington Ball admits his good qualities but adds that he was quarrelsome and undiplomatic, and was suspected of corruption.

Political offices
Preceded by Sir Richard Reade	Lord Chancellor of Ireland; 1548–1551	Succeeded by Sir Thomas Cusack
