= Thomas Marlay (British Army officer) =

Irish soldier

Thomas Marlay (1719–1784) was an Irish soldier of the eighteenth century.

== Early life ==
Marlay was the son of Thomas Marlay, the Lord Chief Justice of Ireland, and through him was descended from the leading English Civil War figure Sir John Marlay. His mother was Anne de Laune (died c. 1769) and was the daughter of Charles de Laune.

Marlay was the brother of Richard Marlay, Bishop of Waterford and Lismore, and the uncle of the Irish politician Henry Grattan, whose father had married Marlay's sister Mary.

== Career ==
Marlay distinguished himself during the Seven Years' War. He served at the Siege of Minorca in 1756. He later served in Germany in command of the 23rd Foot (Royal Welch Fusiliers).

He was wounded at the Battle of Minden, 1 August 1759 and presented with a sword with "warranted never to fail" in letters of gold on it.

His conduct at the Battle of Wilhelmsthal (1762) was praised by the army's commander Duke Ferdinand of Brunswick-Wolfenbüttel who presented him with a snuff box.

Following the Peace of Paris he retired from the army at the rank of lieutenant colonel.

== Personal life ==
He retired to live at Celbridge Abbey in County Kildare, best remembered as the home of Esther Van Homrigh, the beloved "Vanessa" of Jonathan Swift, which his father had bought and rebuilt. He had five children with his wife Mary Doyle. His nephew Henry Grattan stayed with him during the 1770s. After Marlay's death in 1784, Grattan was appointed a guardian of Marlay's children.

== Bibliography ==
- R.B. MacDowell. Grattan: A Life. Lilliput Press, 2001.
