= Bartholomew Van Homrigh =

Lord Mayor of Dublin, Ireland (d. 1703)

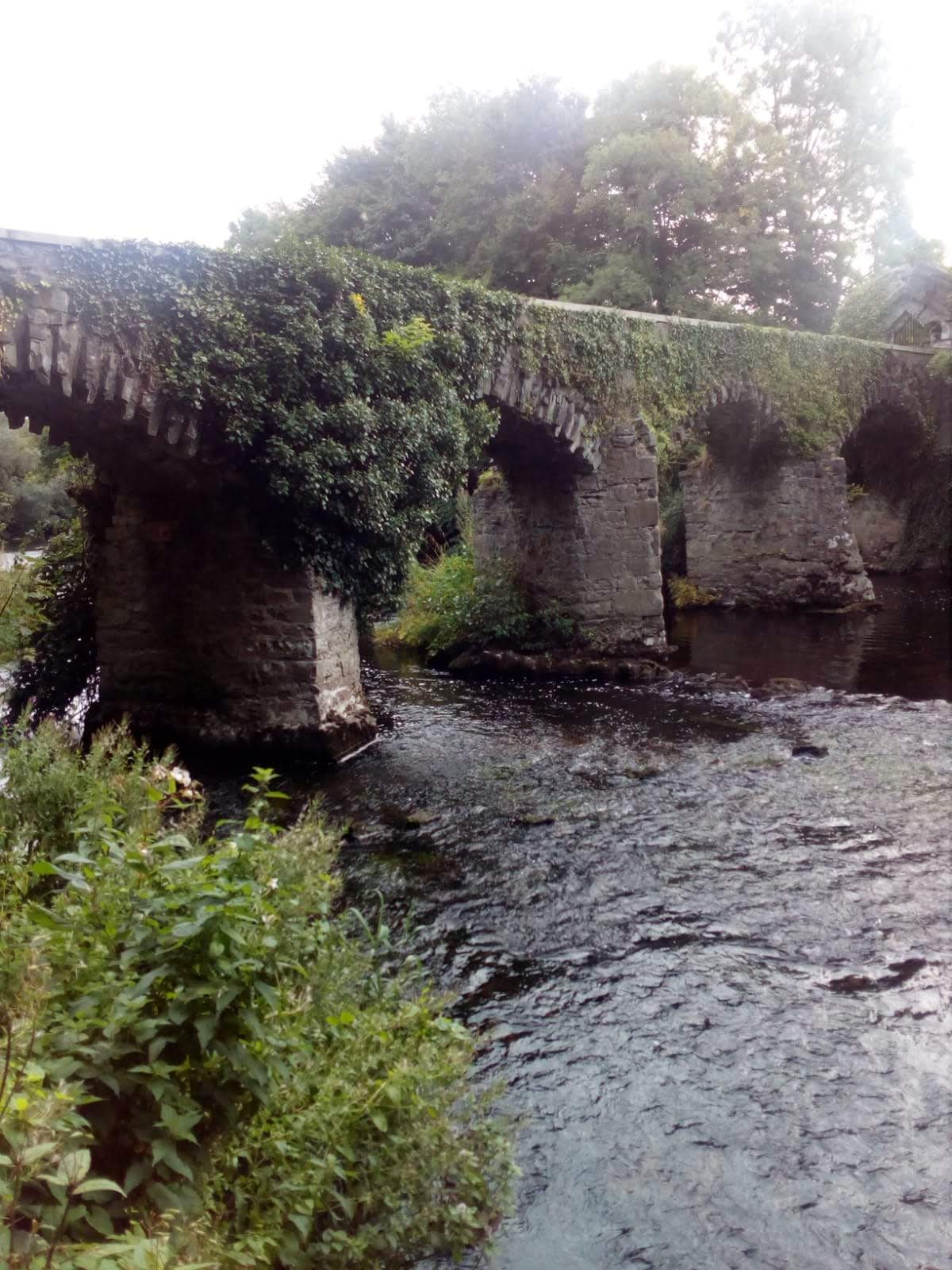
The Celbridge Rock Bridge in the grounds of the Celbridge Abbey, purportedly the oldest extant bridge to cross the River Liffey.

Bartholomew Van Homrigh, also Vanhomrigh (d. 29 December 1703) was a Polish-born Irish merchant, estate agent and politician who served as the 33rd Lord Mayor of Dublin and twice MP for Londonderry City in William III's Irish Parliaments. Surviving correspondence between 1691–1700 with Godert de Ginkel, the 1st Earl of Athlone, for whom Van Homrigh served as estate agent after the Williamite War in Ireland, detail later troop movements, and various legal and financial updates.

== Life and mayoralty ==
Born in Gdańsk (Danzig) in the Polish–Lithuanian Commonwealth sometime before 1665, Van Homrigh came to Dublin from Amsterdam before 1685, and wrote fluent Dutch. On arriving in Dublin Van Homrigh worked as a merchant and was bestowed the Freedom of the City in 1685. He was subsequently one of ten Protestant aldermen and member of the Dublin Corporation by 1687, but was later stricken from the record by Dublin Jacobites for having relocated to Chester during the 1688 Glorious Revolution.

With Sir William Robinson Van Homrigh organised forces for William III of England's invasion of Ireland and served as commissar-general for his armies; he continued logistical work for the King until 1692. Van Homrigh was remade an alderman in 1691 and served as revenue commissioner from 1690–1702 and from 1697–98 the Lord Mayor of Dublin. Whilst Lord Mayor Van Homrigh erected the historic Celbridge Abbey in County Kildare in 1697, where his daughter Esther Vanhomrigh was visited by her lover Jonathan Swift, and received Dublin's modern mayoral chain from William III in 1698.

== Estates and Parliament ==
Van Homrigh represented Londonderry (Derry) in the 1692 and 1695–99 Irish Parliaments, in the later session serving on committees and backing the Tory Lord Chancellor Charles Porter when the latter was accused of corruption and favouring Catholics whilst in office.

On 29 February 1692, William III bestowed the estates of Thomas Dongan, 2nd Earl of Limerick and Christopher Fleming, 17th Baron Slane to the lieutenant-general and commander-in-chief of his forces in Ireland, the Dutch commander Godert de Ginkel, whose victory at the 1691 Siege of Limerick ended the War. Already a Dutch baron, Ginkel entrusted oversight of the 26,480 acres to Van Homrigh, which the latter said accrued rents of £5,567 11s 11.75d between 1 November 1693 and 1 May 1695, owing to competent estate management; in a letter from either 1691 or 1692, the combined value of both estates was said to be over £4,000 per annum. For this, he asked to be rented in perpetuity about 326 acres of land in Celbridge, of which only 250 were granted.

His efforts were assiduous: Ginkel was urged to be naturalised, as he could not otherwise own property in Ireland, and Van Homrigh oversaw legal efforts to have Ginkel's possessions confirmed by the great seals of England and of Ireland, done in 1693 and 1695, respectively. On the decline of the Whig Junto by 1698, the Parliament of England began investigating the King's granting of Irish forfeitures. Though Van Homrigh hoped steadfast opposition by the Country Party would prevent the ultimately successful Act of Resumption (1700) from passage, Ginkel pre-emptively sold his properties for over £7,000, of which two-thirds had to be returned by the Act's terms.

56 letters of correspondence between Van Homrigh and Ginkel survive in the private archive of Amerongen Castle, in 1977 entrusted to the Rijksarchief Utrecht.

== Family ==
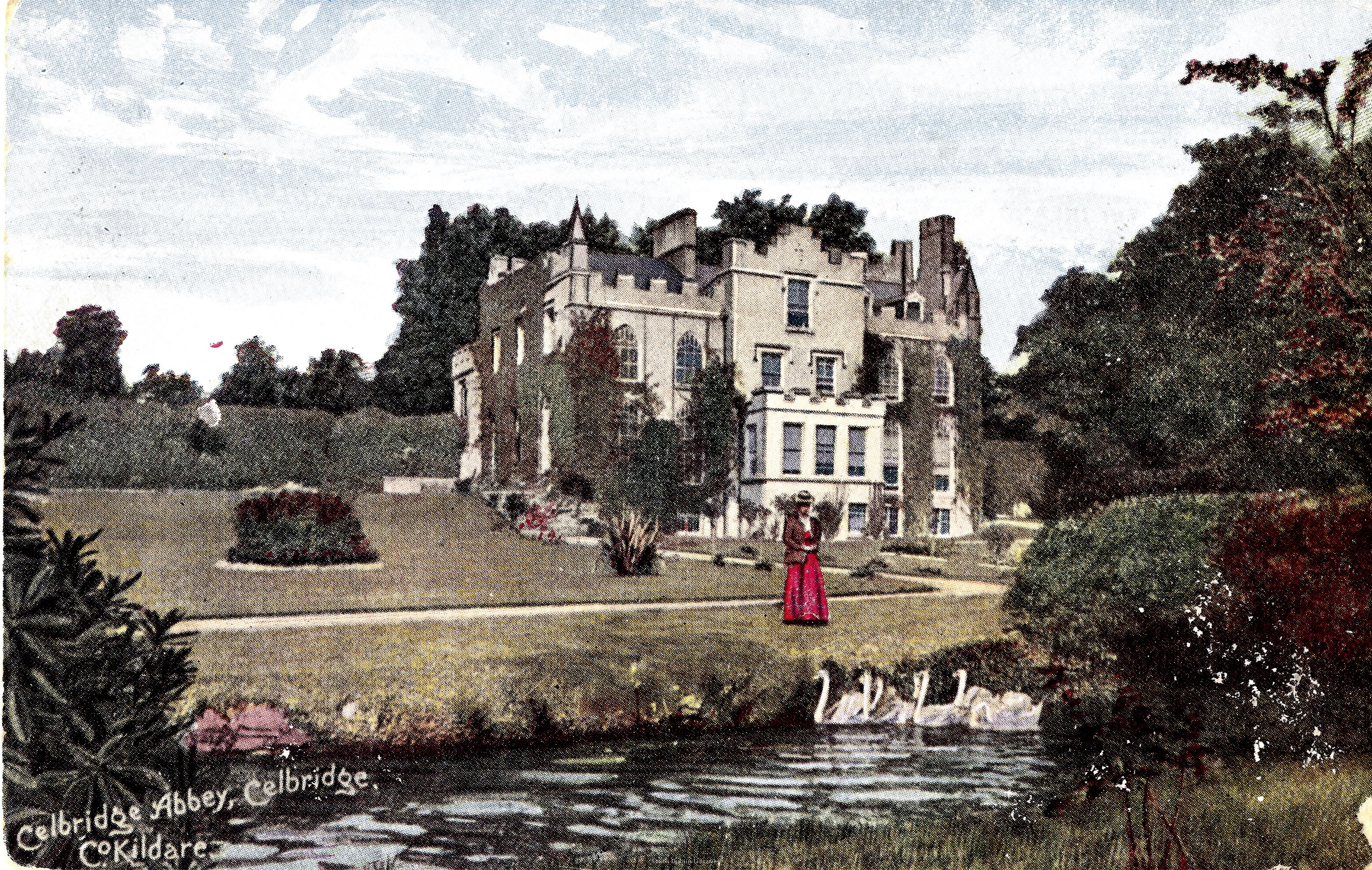
Celbridge Abbey in 1900.

Van Homrigh married Hester Stone (d. 1714) in December 1686, and had either three or four children. The eldest daughter, Esther, was the longtime lover of Swift, immortalised in his work Cadenus and Vanessa. The name "Vanessa", which gained relative popularity in the twentieth century, was invented by Swift for the poem, the 'Van' from her surname 'Van Homrigh', and 'Essa' a diminutive for Esther.

Civic offices
Preceded by Sir William Billington	Lord Mayor of Dublin; 1697–1698	Succeeded by Thomas Quinn
