= Thomas Marlay (judge) =

Irish politician and judge

Thomas Marlay (c. 1680–1756) was an Irish politician and judge, who ended his career as Lord Chief Justice of Ireland. He is remembered chiefly for beginning the rebuilding of Celbridge Abbey, and as the grandfather of the statesman Henry Grattan.

== Background ==
He was born at Creevagh Beg, near Ballymahon, County Longford. His mother Elizabeth Morgan was the daughter of Robert Morgan of Cottlestown, County Sligo, and his wife Bridget Blayney of Castleblayney, County Monaghan. His father Anthony Marlay was a recent arrival in Ireland from Newcastle-upon-Tyne, where Thomas's grandfather Sir John Marlay (1590-1673) had been a leading local politician, who served as both Mayor of Newcastle and its MP; he is chiefly remembered for his spirited defence of the town against the invading Scots army during the English Civil War. From their beginnings as small tradesmen, the Marlays had risen to become among the wealthiest coal exporters in Newcastle.

George Marlay, Bishop of Dromore 1745–1763, was Thomas's younger brother, and gave his name to Marlay House, which was built by his son-in-law, David La Touche. David was an MP, a member of the Privy Council of Ireland, and first Governor of the Bank of Ireland. He married George's daughter, Elizabeth, in 1761.

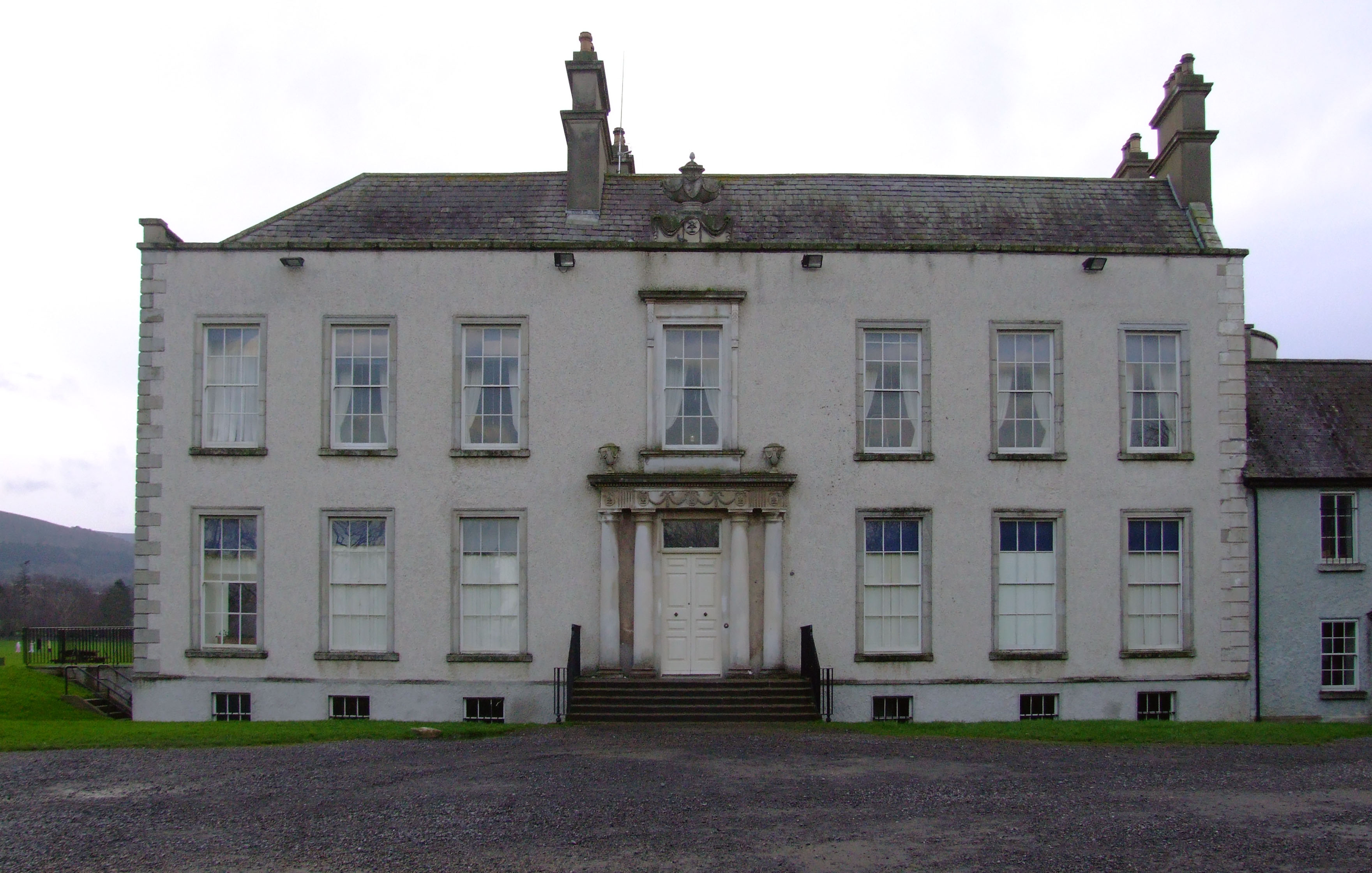
Marlay House, home of Marlay's niece Elizabeth Marlay La Touche.

== Early career ==
Thomas was educated at Trinity College Dublin. Unlike many barristers of his time, he was a considerable scholar and was awarded the degrees of Bachelor of Arts and Doctor of Laws. He was an admirer of John Dryden, whom he met once when he was a student. He was admitted to the Middle Temple, and was called to the Bar. He rapidly built up a large practice at the Irish Bar, although Elrington Ball states that he was not very highly regarded as a lawyer. An anonymous pamphlet from 1730, which took a somewhat jaundiced view of the Irish Bar in general, described him as "a sage refined": whether this tribute to his intellect was ironic or not is unclear.

He was elected to the Irish House of Commons as member for Limavady in 1715, and as member for Lanesborough, 1727–31. He was appointed Solicitor-General for Ireland in 1720 and Attorney-General for Ireland in 1727. He was elevated to the Bench as Lord Chief Baron in 1730 and became Lord Chief Justice of the King's Bench in Ireland in 1741.

== Judge ==
His most memorable trial as Lord Chief Justice was the so-called Annesley perjury case, Annesley v. Lord Anglesey, in 1745. This was one of several trials arising from the celebrated legal battle between James Annesley and his uncle Richard Annesley, 6th Earl of Anglesey as to which of them was the rightful holder of the Anglesey title and estates; the case is said to have inspired the novel Kidnapped by Robert Louis Stevenson. The trial was notable for lasting twenty-two hours without a single break and Marlay, who would normally have expected to have 2 or 3 colleagues to support him, conducted much of it singlehanded, as his colleague Arthur Blennerhassett collapsed from exhaustion. The verdict went in favour of James, but he died before his uncle, without having regained possession of his estates.

A workload as heavy as Marlay's was bound to affect his health, and from 1749 onwards he was too unwell to go on assize. An additional hazard was infectious fever, which was particularly virulent in the Famine years 1740–1741, when two judges died of it. He retired on health grounds in 1751. He died in Drogheda in 1756, while on a visit to his colleague Henry Singleton. He was a popular figure and his death seems to have been genuinely mourned: a Dublin paper published verses praising his gentleness, perfect manners and scholarship (the last being rather unusual among Irish judges of the time).

== Politics- the Lucas affair (1749) ==
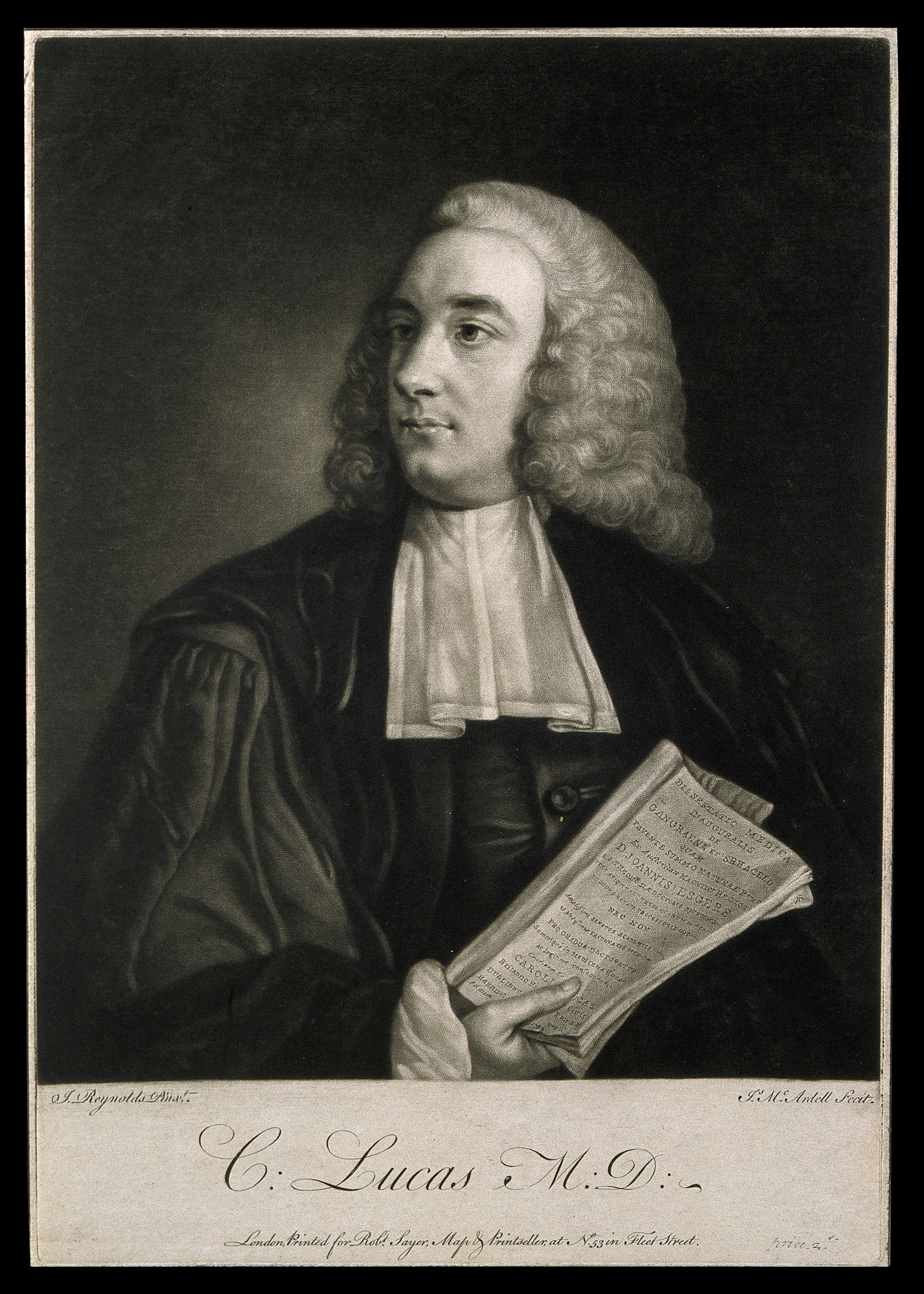
Dr. Charles Lucas, a bitter political enemy of Marlay

In politics he was a staunch conservative, as demonstrated by his stern and contemptuous attitude to the radical doctor, politician and pamphleteer Dr. Charles Lucas (1713-1771). In 1749 Lucas, who was standing for election to the Irish House of Commons in Dublin city, had caused uproar by publishing a series of pamphlets on parliamentary reform, which were alleged to be subversive attacks on the British Crown and the Dublin Government. A Dublin grand jury was empanelled to consider the charges against Lucas: Marlay in ferocious language (he called Lucas "this infamous and impudent scribbler") urged the jury to present him for seditious libel, which they duly did. Lucas, warned to expect severe treatment, had already fled for his own safety to the Isle of Man, and later moved to London. "The scribbler, the impostor, has fled from Justice", Marlay told the grand jury: "His works (but I hope not his influence) remain".

== Family ==
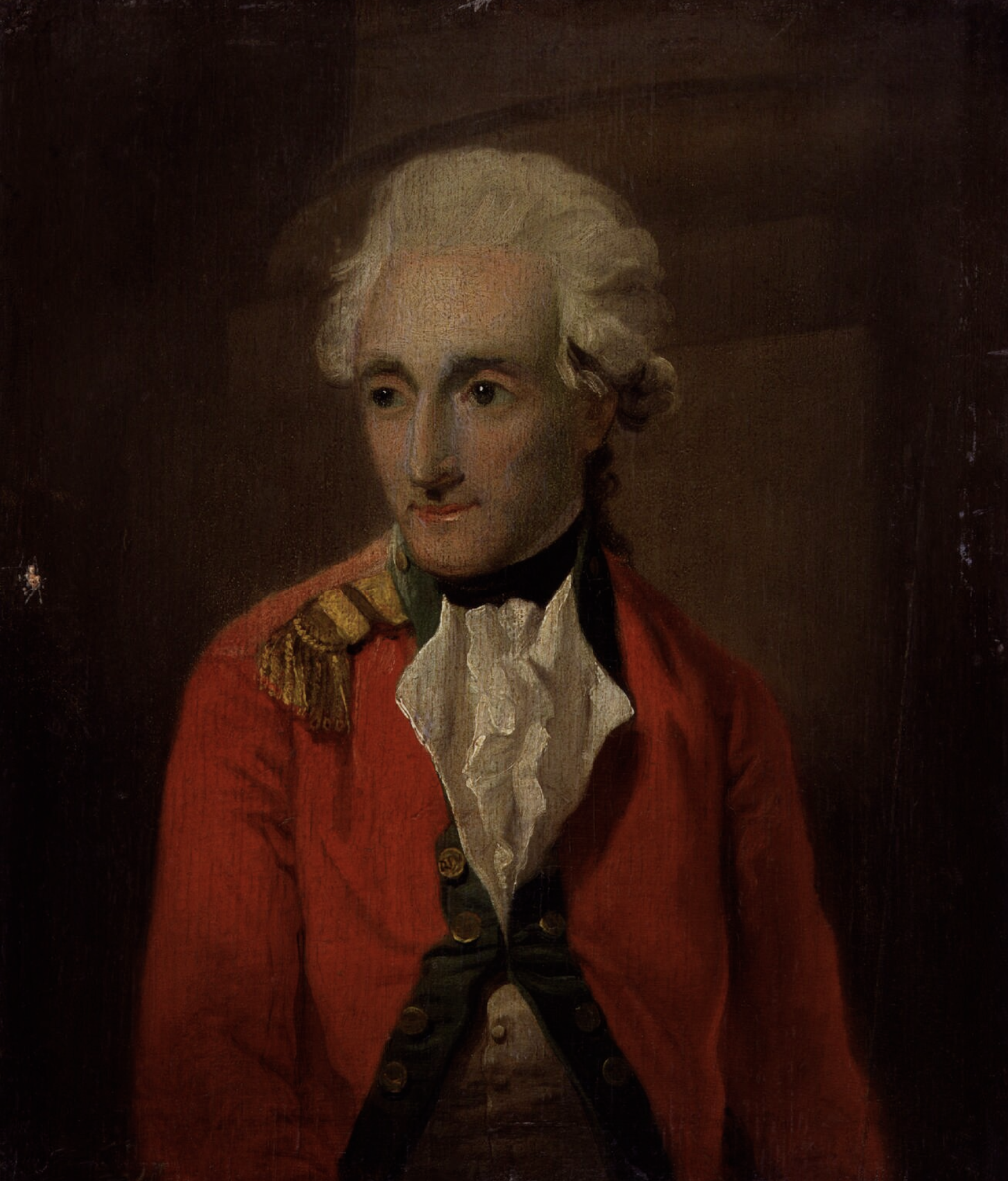
Henry Grattan, Marlay's grandson

Marlay began the rebuilding of Celbridge Abbey in County Kildare, which is chiefly remembered as the home of Esther Vanhomrigh, the beloved Vanessa of Jonathan Swift. He purchased it from Esther's executors soon after her death in 1723. His son Richard completed the new house in the 1780s.

He married Anne de Laune (died 1769), daughter of Charles de Laune, in 1707, and had ten children, of whom several died young. Their surviving children included Colonel Thomas Marlay; Richard Marlay, Bishop of Clonfert and later Bishop of Waterford; Anthony, who inherited Celbridge Abbey; Mary, who married James Grattan MP and was the mother of the statesman Henry Grattan; and Alice, who married Richard Levinge (1724-1783) MP, youngest son of Sir Richard Levinge, 1st Baronet, of Calverstown, County Kildare.

Legal offices
Preceded by John Rogerson	Solicitor-General for Ireland; 1720–1727	Succeeded by Robert Jocelyn
Preceded by John Rogerson	Attorney-General for Ireland; 1727–1730	Succeeded by Robert Jocelyn
Preceded by Thomas Dalton	Chief Baron of the Irish Exchequer; 1730–1741	Succeeded by John Bowes
Preceded by John Rogerson	Lord Chief Justice of the King's Bench for Ireland; 1741–1751	Succeeded by St George Caulfeild
