= Adam de Hereford =

Norman coloniser of Ireland

Adam de Hereford was one of the first generation of Norman colonisers in Ireland.

== Naval commander ==
He was the Norman commander at a naval battle in 1174 when a fleet of thirty-two ships from Cork, carrying armed men under the command of Gilbert, son of Turgerius, who was presumably an Ostman, attacked a group of Normans who had just plundered Lismore. The Ostmen, who fought with slings and axes, were defeated by the Normans, who fought with bows and arbalests.

Adam is referenced also in the Annals of the Four Masters Cornellin as Dungarvan. Ware annals reference Dungarvan at battle site. Orpen says that it is not quite clear in which port the fight took place. While he says that Dungarvan is named in the Book of Howth and in Bray's Conquest of Ireland, he thinks that Youghal harbour was the more likely site.

== Land ==
After de Hereford was given large territories by Strongbow, he granted lands at what is now Castlewarden, along with Wochtred (Oughter Ard), both in County Kildare, to the Abbey of St Thomas in Dublin, leading to the foundation of St. Wolstan's Priory. In 1219, the Norman landowners, Warrisius de Peche, of the Manor of Lucan and Adam de Hereford, Lord of Leixlip, (Strongbow's right-hand man, and the Norman knight responsible for the construction of Leixlip Castle in 1172) granted to the brethren known as the order of the canons of St. Victor, the lands of St Katherine's, the Prior John Warrisius, Bishop of Meath Simon Rochfort and the Archbishop of Dublin Henry de Loundres are mentioned in the documents.

Among the lands bestowed by Strongbow on de Hereford was half the vill of Aghaboe. This land presumably included what is now the townland of Rathpiper South in County Laois, where one of his descendants, Pipard, is believed to have been the builder of a castle less than one kilometre to the south-west of Coolkerry Castle. Although the castle is no longer to be seen, it was marked on the first Ordnance Survey map and has been said to have been still standing in 1836.
