= Esther Vanhomrigh =

Irish poet, lover of Jonathan Swift (c. 1688 – 1723)

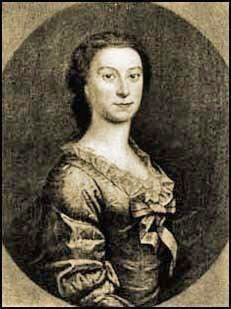
- Born: 1688
- Died: June 2, 1723 (aged 34–35)
- Other name: Vanessa
- Occupation: Poet
- Father: Bartholomew Van Homrigh

Esther Vanhomrigh or Van Homrigh (known by the pseudonym Vanessa; c. 1688 – 2 June 1723), an Irish woman of Dutch descent, was a longtime lover and correspondent of Jonathan Swift. Swift's letters to her were published posthumously. Her fictional name, Vanessa, was created by Swift by taking Van from her surname, Vanhomrigh, and adding Esse, a pet form of her first name, Esther.

== Life ==
Esther Vanhomrigh was the daughter of Bartholomew Van Homrigh, a merchant of Amsterdam and afterwards of Dublin, who was appointed commissary of the stores by William III of England upon his expedition into Ireland: he was Lord Mayor of Dublin from 1697 to 1698. Her mother, also named Esther, was the daughter of John Stone, an Irish commissioner of revenue. She grew up at Celbridge Abbey in County Kildare.

Her father died in 1703, and his widow moved her family to London in 1707. Vanhomrigh became acquainted with Jonathan Swift in December of that year at Dunstable, while her family was traveling to London. She was 22 years younger than Swift. Vanhomrigh was said "not to be a beauty", though no contemporary portrait of her exists (the 1868 Millais portrait is a work of artistic imagination). Swift later served as her tutor. After her mother died in 1714, Vanhomrigh followed Swift to Ireland, and returned to Celbridge Abbey.

Their relationship was fraught. It was broken up after 17 years by Swift's relationship with another woman, Esther Johnson, whom he called "Stella", in 1723. Swift had known Johnson since about 1690, when she was a little girl in the household of his employer, Sir William Temple; their relationship was intense and it is possible that they had secretly married in 1716. Vanhomrigh is thought to have asked Swift not to see Stella again, and he apparently refused, thus putting an end to their relationship.

Vanhomrigh died on 2 June 1723, probably from tuberculosis contracted from nursing her sister Mary, who had died of the same disease in 1720, as had their mother; some accused Swift of inadvertently causing her death.

Vanhomrigh's father had left her well provided for, but she was burdened by debts accumulated by her mother and her brother Bartholomew. In her will, Vanhomrigh named the barrister Robert Marshall and George Berkeley, the celebrated philosopher and future Bishop of Cloyne, executors and joint residuary legatees of her estate, although she knew neither man well. Due to the debts, a protracted lawsuit ensued and a large part of the estate went to legal costs. It was widely reported that she had made it a condition of the inheritance that her executors publish all her correspondence with Swift, but in fact, no such stipulation seems to have been made.

Swift, whose letters to her were published after her death, is not mentioned in her will.

== Legacy ==
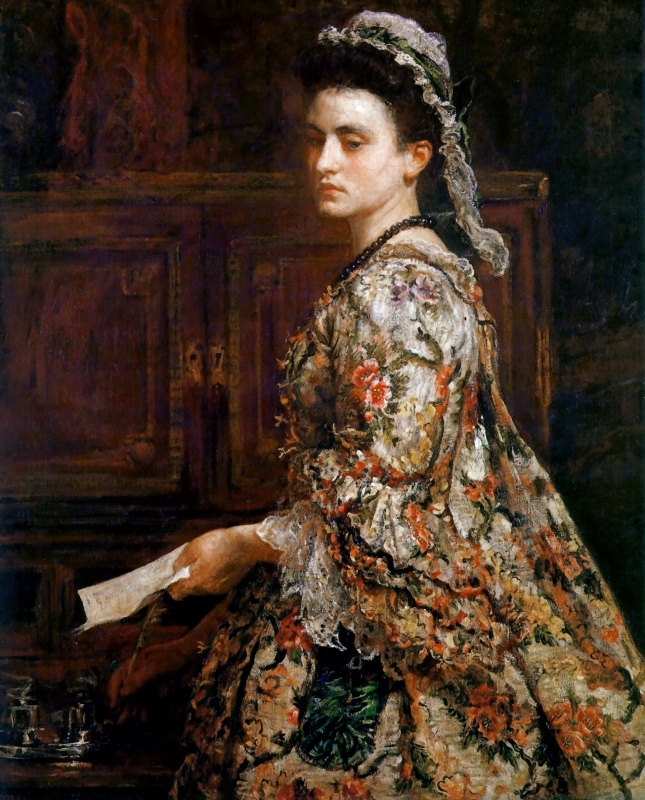
Vanessa by John Everett Millais, 1868. This is not a portrait, but is a work of artistic imagination

Vanhomrigh was fictionalized as Vanessa in Swift's poem Cadenus and Vanessa (1713). In the poem, he wrote:

Each girl, when pleased with what is taught,
Will have the teacher in her thought.

A ward in St Patrick's University Hospital is named “Vanessa” in her honour.

Pre-Raphaelite artist John Everett Millais painted a fancy portrait of her in 1868, over 100 years after her death: Vanessa. The painting depicts Esther holding a letter, presumably written to or by Swift. The portrait is an imagined likeness: no contemporary portrait of Esther is known to survive and there are only a few rather vague descriptions of her appearance.

Margaret Louisa Woods wrote a novel inspired by her life titled Esther Vanhomrigh (1891).

Elizabeth Myers, wife of Littleton C. Powys, who was a brother of John Cowper Powys, wrote a novel titled The Basilisk of St. James, (London, 1945, Chapman and Hall), which has as its protagonist Jonathan Swift. Central to the plot is the personal conflict that arose from Swift's relationships with both Esther Vanhomrigh (Vanessa) and Esther Johnson, nicknamed Stella by Swift.

In the 1994 film Words Upon the Window Pane, based on the play by William Butler Yeats, she is played by Orla Brady: the plot turns on a seance in Dublin in the 1920s where the ghosts of Swift, Stella, and Vanessa appear to resume their 200-year-old quarrel.

== Sources ==
- Evelyn Hardy, The Conjured Spirit, Swift: A Study in the Relationship of Swift, Stella, and Vanessa, 1949
- Sir Walter Scott, Life of Jonathan Swift, 1829
