= Belfast Vital =

Annual music festival in Northern Ireland

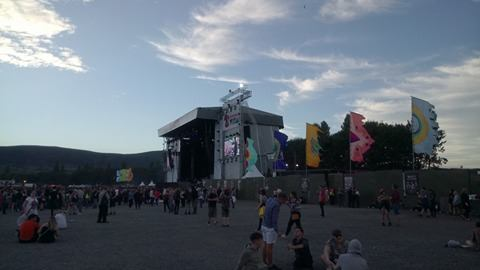
- Tennent's Vital Belfast 2016
- Genre: Indie rock; alternative; hip hop
- Dates: Mid-late August
- Location: Belfast / Bangor
- Years active: 2002–2007; 2011–present

Belfast Vital (formerly Tennent's Vital) is an annual music festival in Northern Ireland. It was first held near Botanic Gardens in 2002 then later moved to Ormeau Park in 2007, both of these venues were in Belfast. The festival had taken a noticeable undesired hiatus between 2008–2010 and returned in August 2011 at Ward Park in Bangor due to success of Ward Park as a venue for Snow Patrol's homecoming gig in 2010 which drew in an estimate crowd of 40,000. Sponsored by C&C Group plc and MCD Productions it was confirmed that the festival was set to return both in 2012 and 2013. In March 2017, it was announced via Facebook that the festival would return, with a new lineup, and under a new name as simply Belfast Vital or Vital. It is not yet clear if this was due to a withdrawal in sponsorship from Tennents although there was nothing to suggest this and it was likely just a minor rebrand. The Belfast Vital continued to be held annually until at least 2025.

Notable headliners throughout the years have included Green Day, The Killers, Snow Patrol, Kaiser Chiefs, Kings of Leon, Franz Ferdinand, The White Stripes, Ash, The Streets, Primal Scream, Eminem and Sam Fender.

== History ==
=== 2026 ===
20 August	22 August
Headliners: Lewis Capaldi; Confirmed Support: Loyle Carner; Dermot Henry	Headliners: Calvin Harris; Confirmed Support: Jazzy

=== 2025 ===
28 August	29 August
Headliners: Sam Fender; Confirmed Support: CMAT; Aaron Rowe	Headliners: Fontaines D.C.; Confirmed Support: Kneecap; Chalk; Dead Dads Club

=== 2024 ===
16 August	17 August
Headliners: Liam Gallagher; Confirmed Support: Kasabian	Headliners: Noah Kahan; Confirmed Support: Maisie Peters; Alessi Rose

=== 2023 ===
1 September

Headliners

- The Killers

Confirmed Support

- Johnny Marr
- Cian Ducrot

=== 2019 ===
Continuing under the name of Belfast Vital, Foo Fighters were announced to return to Belfast after a successful show at Vital 2012. They performed at Boucher Road Playing Fields on Monday, 19 August along with support acts Frank Carter & The Rattlesnakes, Hot Milk and King Nun.

19 August
Headliners
- Foo Fighters

Confirmed Support

- Frank Carter & The Rattlesnakes
- Hot Milk
- King Nun

=== 2018 ===
Continuing under the new name of Belfast Vital, Martin Garrix was announced to return to Belfast after a successful show in Belsonic 2017. He will play at Boucher Road Playing Fields on Saturday, 25 August along with supporting acts Steve Angello, Zara Larsson and others.

25 August
Headliners
- Martin Garrix
- Steve Angello
- Zara Larsson
- Lööp
- Chasing Abbey

=== 2017 ===
Under a different name of Belfast Vital, MCD Productions announced in March that Muse and Biffy Clyro would be headlining Day One of the festivals on Wednesday 23 August. Shortly after in April, it was announced Tiësto and Clean Bandit would be headlining Day Two of the festival on Saturday 26 August. This would be the second time Tiësto would headline a show in Belfast after Belsonic 2016 the year before at Titanic Belfast.

23 August	26 August
Headliners: Muse; Biffy Clyro; Nothing But Thieves; Fangclub	Headliners: Tiësto; Clean Bandit; Robin Schulz; Sigala; DISCIPLΞS; John Gibbons

=== 2016 ===
In March 2016, MCD productions announced Tennent's Vital will return to Boucher Road Playing Fields with the headlining acts of Red Hot Chili Peppers and Avicii on Thursday 25 August and Friday 26 August. This would be the second time Avicii has headlined Tennent's Vital and was also his last weekend of shows before retiring from touring.

25 August	26 August
Headliners: Red Hot Chili Peppers; Fall Out Boy; Labrinth; Cage The Elephant; Otherkin	Headliners: Avicii; Jess Glynne; Seeb; Galantis; Duke Dumont; Zak Abel

=== 2015 ===
In early 2015, it was announced that Tennent's Vital would be back for another year at the Boucher Road playing fields with Calvin Harris headlining Day 1 and The Script returning to headline Day 2. This is the second time The Script have headlined the event following a headlining set on Day 2 in 2011.

29 August	30 August
Headliners: Calvin Harris; Confirmed Support: Ellie Goulding; John Newman; Disciples; Burns	Headliners: The Script; Confirmed Support: Kodaline; Annie Mac; Clean Bandit; Pixie>Panda

=== 2014 ===
On 21 March 2014, Tennents Vital released an official statement confirming the festival would return in summer 2014. On 25 March, organisers confirmed via their official website, Facebook, Twitter and Snapchat that The Killers would headline the first day of the festival supported by Bastille. This will be The Killer's second time headlining the event following a headlining set in 2007, while Bastille are making their Tennents Vital debut this year.

21 August	24 August
Headliners: The Killers; Confirmed Support: Bastille	Headliners: David Guetta; Confirmed Support: Steve Angello; Klangkarussell; Robin Schulz

=== 2013 ===
On 9 April, Vital officially announced its return, playing at the Boucher Road Playing fields again. The first act announced were Kings Of Leon, and on 11 June The Vaccines were announced as the main support act for the first day. On 13 May, Snow Patrol were announced along with singer/songwriter Foy Vance and Irish upstarts Kodaline, following day Jason Mraz was added to the bill. On 11 June, Vital announced its first-ever 3-day festival, with Avicii, Tinie Tempah, Rudimental and Tommy Trash playing on the 3rd day.

14 August	15 August	16 August
Headliners: Kings Of Leon; Confirmed Support: The Vaccines; The Undertones; The Minutes	Headliners: Snow Patrol; Confirmed Support: Jason Mraz; Foy Vance; Kodaline	Headliners: Avicii; Confirmed Support: Tinie Tempah; Rudimental; Tommy Trash; Naughty Boy

=== 2012 ===
On 8 February, Vital announced that they would be running "Tennent's Untapped", a platform to give rising bands an opportunity to make themselves known, with the winners securing a set on the Main Stage of the 2012 Vital concert. On 5 March, Tennents Vital confirmed via Facebook that the lineup for its 2012 concert would be revealed live on Tuesday 20 March at its live launch party at a secret location, and also via its official website. On 16 March via their official Facebook page, Tennents Vital announced that the venue for the 2012 concert had been moved from Ward Park Bangor to Boucher Playing Fields, Belfast. On 20 March, The Stone Roses and Florence and the Machine were confirmed to be playing Wednesday 22 August, as confirmed via the official Tennents Vital Facebook page. The Foo Fighters and the Black Keys were also announced through MCD's official site. The Stone Roses leaked their announcement early via their Twitter page.

21 August	22 August
Headliners: Foo Fighters; Confirmed Support: The Black Keys; The Cribs; The Minutes; Trucker Diablo	Confirmed: The Stone Roses; Confirmed Support: Florence And The Machine; Rodrigo y Gabriela; Maverick Sabre; Gerard i2

=== 2011 ===
BBC News reported that MCD Productions paid the previous debt in April while requesting permission for future events at Ormeau Park suggesting a strong possibility that Tennent's Vital would be back. This previous debt was due to gaining permissions to hold the concerts in 2010.

It was later announced on 12 May 2011 that Tennent's Vital will be held on 23 and 24 August in Ward Park, Bangor despite rumours of it being held in Ormeau Park. The official line up is due to be announced on Wednesday 25 May.

An advertising campaign began immediately. Power hosed advertisements appeared outside University of Ulster Belfast and Queen's University Belfast while Translink Metro services were used for regular advertisements with online banners on selected music-related websites. On 25 May Eminem was formally announced to headline on 24 August. The remainder of the line up; both for support and the other day have yet to be announced. Script and Two Door Cinema Club were confirmed as headliners for Day 1 of Tennents Vital (23 August). On 16 June, Vital confirmed on Facebook that Ellie Goulding and The Wombats will also be on the bill of Day 1.

23 August	24 August
Headliners: The Script; Confirmed Support: Two Door Cinema Club; Ellie Goulding; Ryan Sheridan; The Wombats	Confirmed: Eminem; Confirmed Support: Kaiser Chiefs; Jimmy Eat World; D12; OFWGKTA

=== 2007 ===
Moving Tennent's Vital to Ormeau Park allowed for the event to grow. Razorlight headlined the main stage on Tuesday 21 August while The Killers headlined on Wednesday 22nd. There was a combined audience of 45,000 across two days. BBC Northern Ireland featured the events live on air. The weather during the festival was fitting and there were no reports of serious crime except noise pollution calls within the nearby student housing area after the festival ended.

Tuesday 21 August	Wednesday 22 August
Razorlight; Manic Street Preachers; The View; The Hold Steady; Nice N Sleezy; Radio 1 Stage: Justice; The Rumble Strips; Oppenheimer; Steer Cleer; General Fiasco	The Killers; Kasabian; Mark Ronson; The Shins; Albert Hammond Jr; Radio 1 Stage: The Holloways; Alloy Mental; I Was A Cub Scout; Kharma 45; Black Alley Screens

=== 2006 ===
- Snow Patrol
- Kaiser Chiefs
- The Raconteurs
- ¡Forward, Russia!
- Be your own PET
- Duke Special
- Ed Harcourt
- Editors
- Mumm-Ra
- The Pigeon Detectives
- Iain Archer
- Oceansize
- Republic Of Loose
- The Crimea
- Cursive
- Rivals
- Panda Kopanda
- The Dangerfields
- The View
- Eamonn McNamee and the Holy Innocents
- The Tides

=== 2005 ===
- Kings Of Leon
- Faithless
- Franz Ferdinand
- Maroon 5
- Scissor Sisters
- Jem
- The Coral
- The Futureheads
- Driving By Night
- The Cribs
- The Brakes
- Goldie Lookin Chain
- Patiosounds
- Dutch Schultz
- Alloy Mental
- Leya
- the subtitles

=== 2004 ===
The Main Stage in 2004

- The White Stripes
- The Darkness
- Ash
- New York Dolls
- Jurassic 5
- Peaches
- Goldie Lookin Chain
- The Answer
- Acidtone
- Blanche

=== 2003 ===
- Zero 7
- The Streets
- Roger Sanchez
- Death in Vegas
- Richard Fearless
- Roots Manuva
- Nightmares On Wax
- Jon Carter

=== 2002 ===
2002 was the first year of Tennents Vital and was located nearby Queen's University Belfast's PEC centre beside Belfast Botanic Gardens.

- Primal Scream
- Badly Drawn Boy
- Idlewild
- Snow Patrol
- Gemma Hayes
- Fatboy Slim
- Stereo MC's
- Pacha Futura

== Organisation ==
The festival was launched in 2002 by Better Days, a Scottish events and promotion agency and sponsored by C&C Group's Tennents lager brand. management of the event moved to MCD in 2004. With the exception of technical and security staff, there were voluntary opportunities for most positions at Tennents Vital. Stewards are organised by charity Oxfam, which receives a donation in return for their work. Catering, and some retail services, are provided by various small companies, typically mobile catering vans. Significant logistical operations take place to bring people into the festival by public transport each year. In addition to extensive private coach hire by festival-goers, Translink implements additional bus and rail services to meet the increased demand.

== See also ==
- Belsonic
- Radio 1's Big Weekend 2013
