= Longitude Festival =

Music festival in Dublin, Ireland

Coordinates: 53.27635°N 6.27046°W

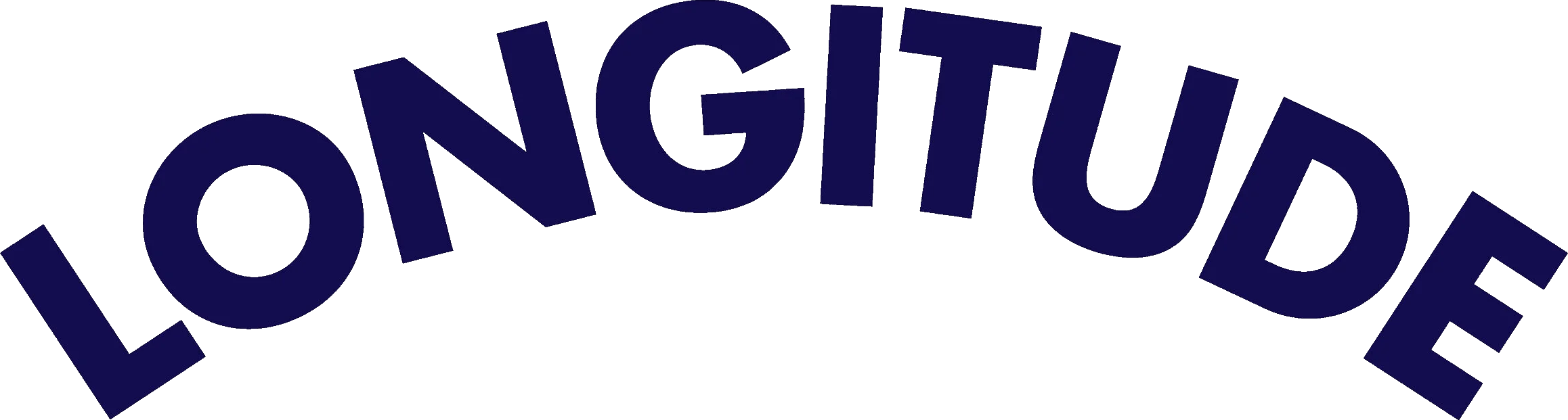

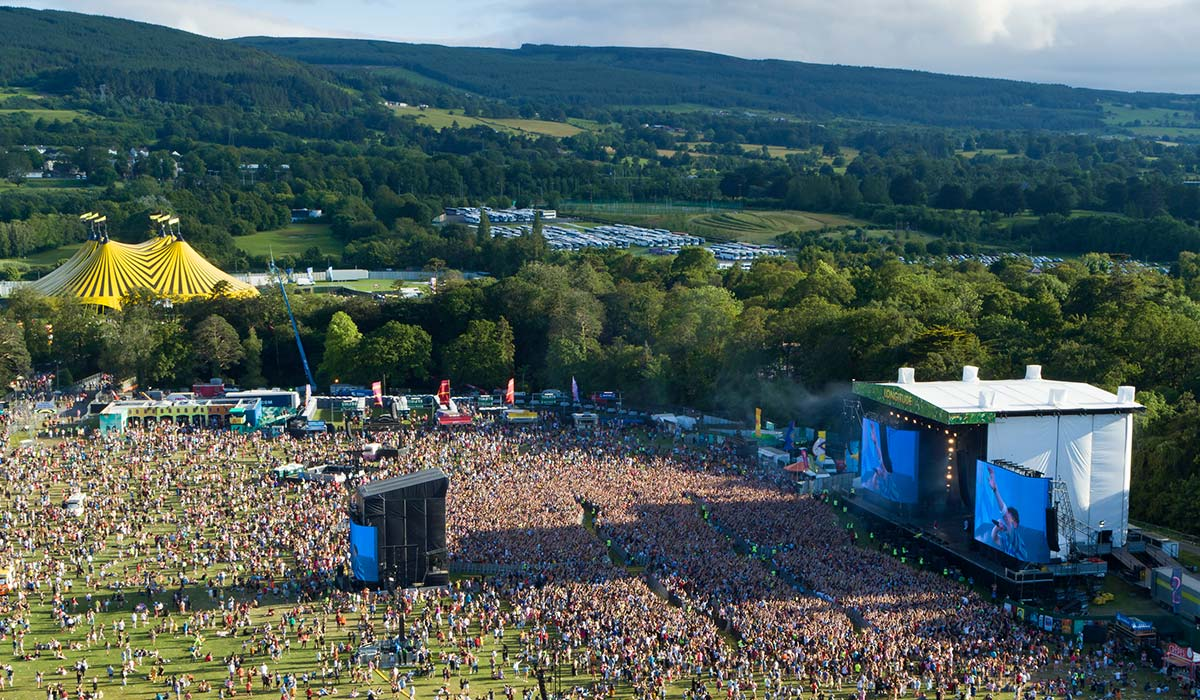
- Longitude Festival 2019 at Marlay Park
- Genre: Primarily hip hop, but also electronic dance music, alternative rock, pop
- Dates: July
- Locations: 2013–present: Marlay Park, Dún Laoghaire–Rathdown, Ireland
- Years active: 13 years, 3 months
- Inaugurated: 19–21 July 2013
- Most recent: 05-06 2025
- Next event: 2026
- Attendance: 40,000 (2023)
- Organiser: MCD Productions
- Sponsors: Three Ireland, Heineken, Red Bull, Bacardi, Coca-Cola, Uber, Visa, Spin 1038 (Official partners)
- Website: www.longitude.ie

Longitude Festival is a music festival that takes place during July every year in Dublin, Ireland. Since 2013, Marlay Park has been home to the festival. It is organised by MCD Productions and Festival Republic.

When the festival first started in its early years the line up was mostly bands and singer songwriters such as Phoenix, Kodaline, and Sam Smith. As the festival evolved in later years it mostly consisted of hip hop artists such as Stormzy, Travis Scott, and Ski Mask the Slump God.

There are multiple bars around the festival owned by Heineken, Bacardi, and Red Bull. Around the venue multiple food stalls can be found with a wide variety of food and drink. There is also the Longitude Lounge which is sponsored by Coca-Cola and is accessible by VIP ticket holders.

Three Ireland offer free portable battery banks at the festival for a small deposit that can be redeemed if you give the battery bank back by the end of the festival. The festivals age restrictions require under 16's to be accompanied by an adult. Longitude Festival has a sister festival in the United Kingdom called Latitude Festival.

== 2013 ==
Longitude Festival 2013 was announced in late 2012 by the organizers of Oxegen Festival. The 2013 festival had six different stages: the Longitude Main Stage, Heineken Live Project Stage, Phantom Green stage, Woodlands Stage, Red Bull Music Academy Stage, and The Dirty Old Town Speakeasy.

The first festival took place on Friday 19 July to Sunday 21 July 2013. Some of the acts on the line-up were:

Phoenix (Friday Headliner), Vampire Weekend (Saturday Headliner), Kraftwerk (Sunday Headliner), Foals, Jake Bugg, Kodaline, The Maccabees, Hot Chip, MØ.

== 2014 ==
The 2014 Longitude Festival was held from Friday 18 July to Sunday 20 July 2014. Some of the acts on the line-up were:

Ben Howard (Friday Headliner), Disclosure (Saturday Headliner), Massive Attack (Sunday Headliner), Bastille, Bombay Bicycle Club, The 1975, Hozier, Rudimental, Sam Smith

== 2015 ==
The 2015 Longitude Festival was held from Friday 17 July to Sunday 19 July 2015. Some of the acts on the line-up were (headline acts in bold):

Hozier (Friday Headliner), Alt-J (Saturday headliner), The Chemical Brothers (Sunday Headliner), The Vaccines, Catfish and the Bottlemen, Wolf Alice, Years and Years, James Blake, Pusha T

== 2016 ==
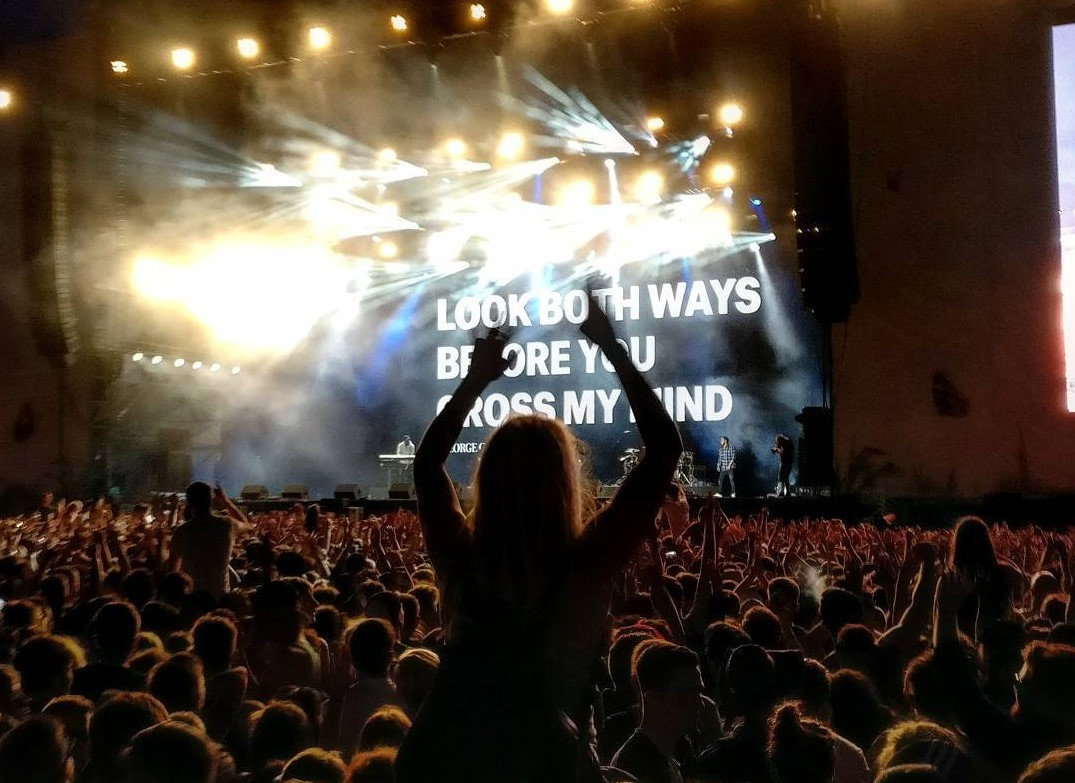
Kendrick Lamar performing on the Main Stage at Longitude Festival 2016

The 2016 Longitude Festival was held from Friday 15 July to Sunday 17 July 2016. Some of the artists that played at the 2016 festival include:

Kendrick Lamar (Friday headliner), Major Lazer (Saturday headliner), The National (Sunday headliner), The Lumineers, The Coronas, Father John Misty, Jamie xx, Chvrches, Diplo

== 2017 ==
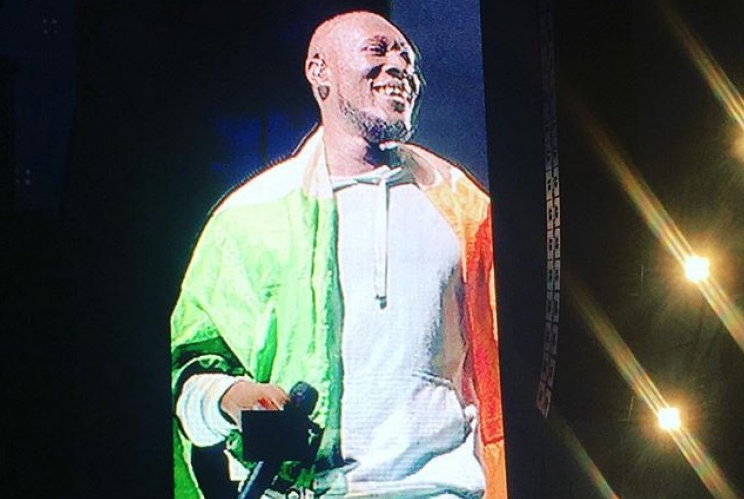
Stormzy performing at Longitude Festival 2017

The 2017 Longitude Festival was held from Friday 14 July to Sunday 16 July 2017 with an attendance of 35,000 people. Some of the artists that played at the 2017 festival include:

Stormzy (Friday headliner), The Weeknd (Saturday headliner), Mumford & Sons (Sunday headliner), Picture This, G-Eazy, Skepta, Leon Bridge, Mac Miller, Brave Giant

=== Line-up ===
Line-up: (headliners in bold):

**Main Stage**
Friday	Saturday	Sunday
**Stormzy** 9:30 pm – 10:45 pm Picture This 7:45 pm – 8:45 pm G-Eazy 6:15 pm – 7:15 pm Dua Lipa 5 pm – 5:45 pm Dave 3:30 pm – 4:15 pm Barq 2:30 pm – 3 pm	**The Weeknd** 9:30 pm – 10:45 pm Skepta 8 pm – 9 pm Kaytranada 6:15 pm – 7:30 pm Mac Miller 4:35 pm – 5:45 pm Kaleo 3:15 pm – 4 pm Ray BLK 2 pm – 2:45 pm	**Mumford & Sons** 9 pm – 10:30 pm Leon Bridges 7:15 pm – 8:15 pm Glass Animals 5:45 pm – 6:45 pm Milky Chance 4:30 pm – 5:15 pm The Very Best 3 pm – 4 pm Áine Cahill 2 pm – 2:30 pm

**Heineken Stage**
Friday	Saturday	Sunday
The Martinez Brothers; Young Thug; Gucci Mane; Wiley; Loyle Carner; Raye; Brave Giant	Catfish and the Bottlemen; All Tvvins; Mick Jenkins; Tom Misch; Pusha T Jessie Reyez; Columbia Mills	Jack Garratt; Villagers; HVOB; Jorja Smith; Gill Landry; Catherine McGrath

== 2018 ==
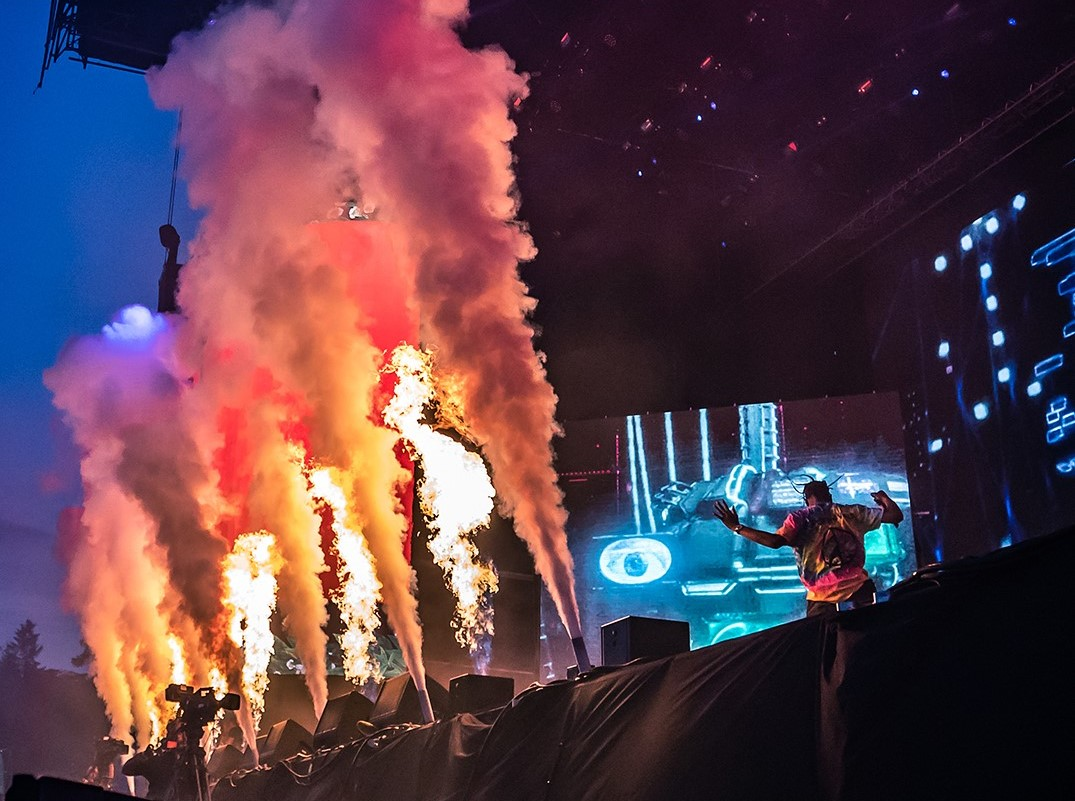
Travis Scott performing on the Main Stage at Longitude Festival 2018

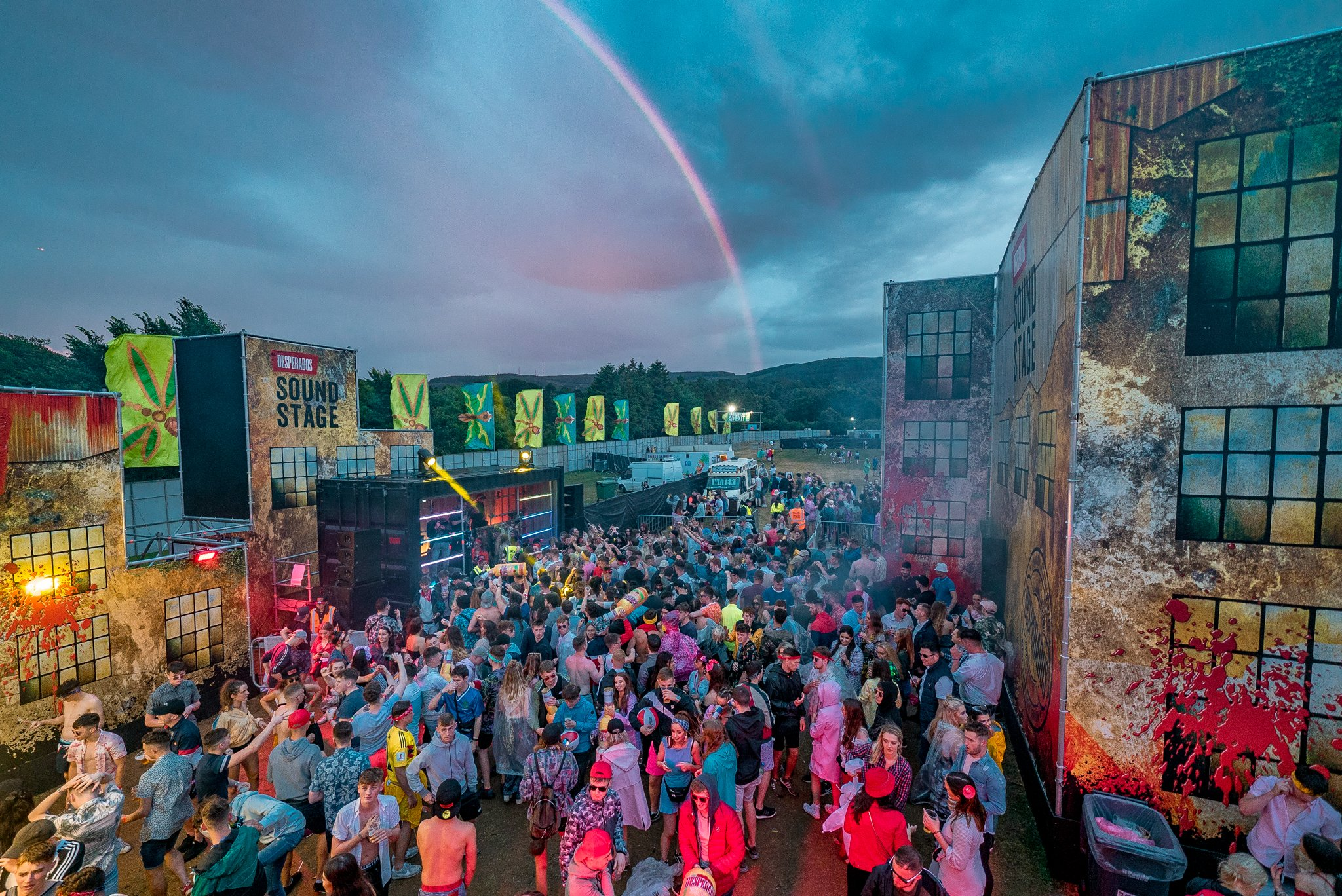
Desperados Sound Stage at Longitude Festival 2018

The 2018 Longitude Festival was held from Friday 13 July to Sunday 15 July 2018 with an attendance of 40,000 people.

Longitude Festival 2018 had seven stages: the Longitude Main Stage, Heineken Stage, Heineken Live Your Music Stage, Red Bull Music, Life Style Sports Stage, Three Made By Music, and the Desperados Sound Stage.

=== Performer cancellations ===
Blackbear was supposed to perform at the festival but cancelled due to health issues. Cardi B was also to perform at the 2018 festival but cancelled weeks prior as she was pregnant at the time.

=== Conor McGregor ===
Conor McGregor was spotted on the first day of the festival during J. Cole's performance.

=== Line-up ===
Line-up: (headliners in bold):

**Main Stage**
Friday	Saturday	Sunday
**J. Cole** 9:45 pm – 10:45 pm Migos 7:45 pm – 8:45 pm Post Malone 6:15 pm – 7:15 pm Alma 5 pm – 4:45 pm A Boogie wit da Hoodie 3:45 pm – 4:30 pm Jafaris 2:45 pm – 3:15 pm	**Travis Scott** 9:30 pm – 10:45 pm Diplo 8 pm – 9 pm Tyler, the Creator 6:30 pm – 7:30 pm Giggs 5:15 pm – 5:55 pm Sigrid 4 pm – 4:45 pm Playboi Carti 2:45 pm – 3:30 pm Big Shaq 2 pm – 2:30 pm	**Solange** 9 pm – 10:30 pm SZA 7:30 pm – 8:30 pm Anderson Paak 6 pm – 7 pm The Internet 4:45 pm – 5:30 pm Kali Uchis 3:30 pm – 4:15 pm Sorcha Richardson 2:30 pm – 3 pm

**Heineken Stage**
Friday	Saturday	Sunday
Blackbear (cancelled); Khalid 9:30 pm – 10:30 pm Joey Badass 8 pm – 9 pm Versatile 6:30 pm – 7:15 pm 6lack 5:15 pm – 6 pm Princess Nokia 4 pm – 4:45 pm Flynn 2:45 pm – 3:15 pm	Chasing Abbey 9:30 pm – 10:30 pm Rejjie Snow 8 pm – 9 pm Lil Pump 6:45 pm – 7:30 pm Kojaque 5:30 pm – 6:15 pm Mabel 4:15 pm 4:45 pm Mango x Mathman 3 pm – 3:45 pm Sequence 2 pm – 2:30 pm	Cardi B (cancelled); The Story of Hip Hop by RTÉ 9:30 pm – 10:30 pm J Hus 8 pm – 8:45 pm Sampha 6:30 pm – 7:30 pm Ibeyi 5:15 pm – 6 pm IAMDDB 4 pm – 4:45 pm Lilly Vargen 2:30 pm – 3:15 pm

**Lifestyle Sports Stage**
Friday	Saturday	Sunday
Day_S; Tebi Rex; Laoise; Bas; JyellowL; Padraig McMahon	Soulé; Erica Cody; Jesse James Solomon; Emily Burns; TED; Opal Lights	Belly; Le Boom; Jacob Banks; Naaz; Durand Jones; Radical Centrists

**Red Bull Music Stage**
Friday	Saturday	Sunday
Stevie G Krystal Klear; Eve; Cailin; Sarah Mooney	DJ Deece; Boots and Kats; Jack Thomson; Long Island Sound; Staxx Lyrical	Ghostboy; Solardo; Kettama; Ciara Brady; Justyna Koss

== 2019 ==
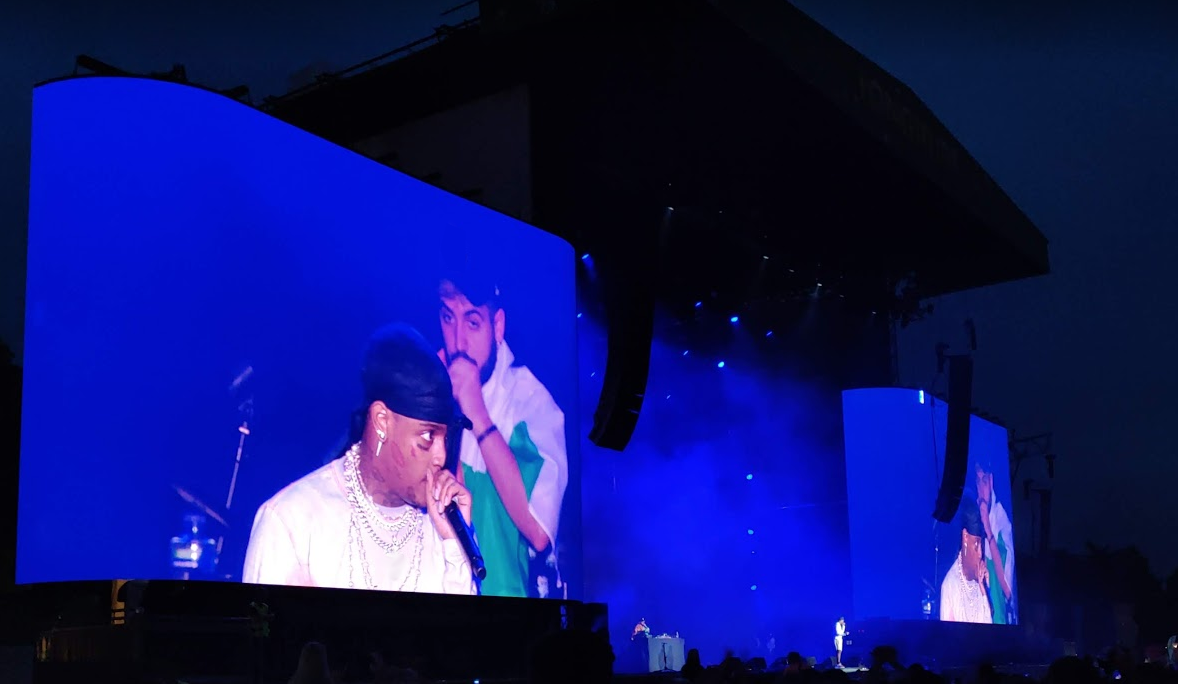
Ski Mask The Slump God performing on Friday night at Longitude Festival 2019

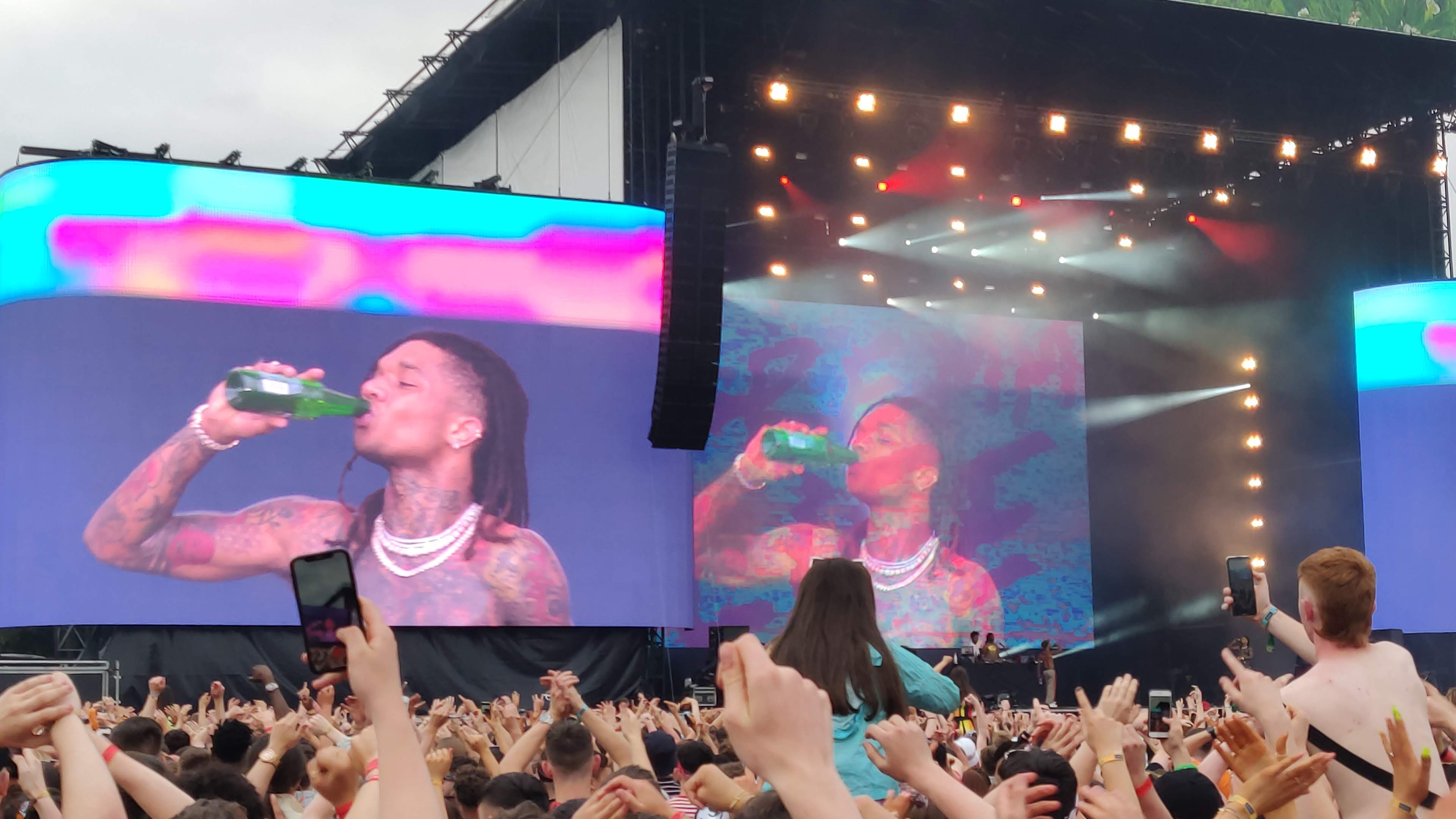
Rae Sremmurd performing on the Main Stage at Longitude Festival 2019

Brockhampton performing on the Main Stage at Longitude Festival 2019

The 2019 Longitude Festival was held from Friday 5 July to Sunday 7 July 2019 with an attendance of 40,000 people.

Longitude Festival 2019 had six stages: The Longitude Main Stage, Heineken Stage, Heineken Live Your Music Stage, Spin House Party, Elevation Stage, and Three Made By Music.

=== A$AP Rocky controversy and other cancellations ===
A$AP Rocky was supposed to headline on Friday night, but during July he was arrested in Sweden after an altercation on the street in Stockholm. He was replaced by Ski Mask the Slump God.

Chance the Rapper and Lil Uzi Vert were also scheduled to perform at the festival but both pulled out weeks prior.

=== Conor McGregor ===
Conor McGregor was spotted for the second year in a row at the festival during Cardi B's performance.

=== US Embassy ===
The US Embassy in Ireland issued a security alert to notify US citizens that they should avoid going to the 2019 festival as there is a risk of violence. The festival promoters response to the US Embassies warning was that it is "beyond ridiculous".

=== Line-up ===
Line-up (with headliners in bold):

**Main Stage**
Friday	Saturday	Sunday
~~A$AP Rocky~~ (cancelled); **Ski Mask the Slump God** 9:45 pm – 10:45 pm Rae Sremmurd 8:15 pm – 9:15 pm Versatile 6:45 pm – 7:30 pm Gunna 5:30 pm – 6:15 pm Trippie Redd 4:15 pm – 5 pm Pusha T 3 pm – 3:45 pm	**~~Chance the Rapper~~** (cancelled); **Stormzy** 9:30 pm – 10:45 pm Anne-Marie 8 pm – 9 pm Dave 6:45 pm – 7:30 pm Lil Baby 5:30 pm – 6:15 pm Bugzy Malone 4:10 pm – 4:50 pm Headie One 3 pm – 3:45 pm	**Cardi B** 9:30 pm – 10:30 pm **Future** 8 pm – 9 pm Brockhampton 6:30 pm – 7:30 pm Joyner Lucas 5:15 pm – 6 pm Sheck Wes 3:55 pm – 4:30 pm Why-Axis 2:45 pm – 3:25 pm

**Heineken Stage**
Friday	Saturday	Sunday
Chasing Abbey 9:45 pm – 10:30 pm Flatbush Zombies 8:30 pm – 9:15 pm Kojaque 7:15 pm – 8 pm J.I.D 6 pm – 6:45 pm Not3s 4:45 pm – 5:30 pm Kneecap 3:30 pm – 4:15 pm Grace Carter 2:30 pm – 3 pm	~~Lil Uzi Vert~~ (cancelled); Wild Youth 9:45 pm – 10:30 pm Aminé 8:30 pm – 9:15 pm $uicideboy$ 7:15 pm – 8 pm Denzel Curry 5:45 pm – 6:30 pm AJ Tracey 4:30 pm – 5:15 pm Fredo 3:15 pm – 4 pm Nealo 2:15 pm – 2:45 pm	Juice WRLD 9:15 pm – 10:15 pm Vince Staples 8:15 pm – 9 pm Hannah Wants 7 pm – 7:45 pm Little Simz 5:45 pm – 6:30 pm Slowthai 4:30 pm – 5:15 pm YBN Cordae 3:30 pm – 4 pm

**Elevation Stage**
Friday	Saturday	Sunday
Happyalone 8:30 pm – 9:10 pm Jimothy 7:15 pm – 8 pm Flohio 6:10 pm – 6:50 pm Adekunle Gold 5 pm – 5:40 pm JyellowL 4 pm – 4:30 pm	JPEGMAFIA 6:30 pm – 7:15 pm Joey Purp 5:15 pm – 6 pm LAOISE 4:15 pm – 4:45 pm Mallrat 3 pm – 3:30 pm	Biig Piig 8 pm – 8:45 pm Amber Mark 6:45 pm – 7:30 pm Saweetie 5:30 pm – 6:15 pm Buddy 4:15 pm – 5 pm Barny Fletcher 3 pm – 3:30 pm

== 2020 ==
The 2020 Longitude Festival was due to be held from Friday 3 July to Sunday 5 July 2020.

=== COVID-19 festival cancellation ===
On 21 April 2020, the Government of Ireland announced that outdoor public gatherings of more than 5,000 people would be banned until 31 August 2020 at the earliest due to COVID-19 concerns. On 22 April 2020, Longitude Festival posted to their website and all of their social media accounts that the festival had been cancelled and would return in 2021. This is the first time in the festival's history that it had to be cancelled.

=== KSI self announcement ===
On 12 February 2020 at the NME Awards in London, rapper and YouTube personality, KSI announced that he would be performing at multiple festivals that year including Longitude Festival.

=== Performer cancellations ===
J Hus was supposed to perform on Friday but cancelled in early February. Pop Smoke was also supposed to perform on Saturday but died on 19 February 2020, after being fatally shot during an invasion of his home in Hollywood Hills, California.

=== Cancelled line-up ===
The line up that was planned for the festival (with headliners in bold):

**Main Stage**
Friday	Saturday	Sunday
**Kendrick Lamar**	**Tyler, the Creator**	A$AP Rocky

**Stage Never Assigned**
Friday	Saturday	Sunday	Day Never Assigned
~~J Hus~~ (cancelled); Mabel; Aitch; EarthGang; Jay1; Tyla Yaweh; Baby Rose	AJ Tracey; Rex Orange County; Meek Mill; Playboi Carti; Lil Tecca; ~~Pop Smoke~~ (cancelled); Polo G	Young Thug; DaBaby; Roddy Ricch; Charli XCX; Doja Cat; Clairo; Girl In Red; Rico Nasty; Joy Crookes; IDK; Santi	KSI

== 2021 ==
Longitude Festival 2021 was due to take place during 2–4 July 2021.

=== COVID-19 festival cancellation ===
On 10 May 2021, Longitude Festival was cancelled for the second year in a row due to COVID-19 concerns.

=== Cancelled line-up ===
Line-up (with headliners in bold):

**Main Stage**
Friday	Saturday	Sunday
**Kendrick Lamar**	**Tyler, The Creator**	A$AP Rocky

**Stage Never Assigned**
Day Never Assigned

Aitch
AJ Tracey
DaBaby
Doja Cat
Lil Uzi Vert
Mabel
Megan Thee Stallion
Playboi Carti
Ski Mask the Slump God
Trippie Redd
Iann Dior
Jack Harlow
Jay1
KSI
Lil Tjay
NLE Choppa
Polo G
Rod Wave
Ivorian Doll
Offica

== 2022 ==
Longitude Festival 2022 was held from Friday 1 July to Sunday 3 July 2022.

=== Line-up ===
Line-up: (headliners in bold):

**Main Stage**
Friday	Saturday	Sunday
**Dave** 9:45pm - 10:45pm Aitch 8:15pm - 9pm Baby Keem 7pm - 7:45pm Mabel 5:45pm - 6:30pm Headie One 4:30pm - 5:15pm Aby Coulibaly 3:30pm - 4pm Plantain Papi 2:30pm - 3pm ~~Doja Cat~~ (cancelled)	**Tyler, the Creator** 9:30pm - 10:45pm Megan Thee Stallion 8pm - 8:45pm Polo G 6:45pm - 7:30pm D-Block Europe 5:30pm - 6:15pm ~~Ski Mask the Slump God~~ (Cancelled) 4:15 - 5pm Denise Chaila 3pm - 3:45pm Monjola 2pm - 2:30pm	A$AP Rocky 9:30pm - 10:30pm The Kid Laroi 8:15pm - 9pm Playboi Carti 7pm - 7:45pm Jack Harlow 5:45pm - 6:30pm Central Cee 4:30pm - 5:15pm Offica 3:30pm - 4pm Sello 2:30pm - 3pm

**Heineken Stage**
Friday	Saturday	Sunday
Obskür 9:30pm - 10:30pm 49th & Main 8:15pm - 9pm Digga D 7pm - 7:45pm Arrdee 5:45pm - 6:30pm Knucks 4:30pm - 5:15pm Enny 3:30pm - 4pm Khakikid 2:30pm - 3pm	Jax Jones 9:45pm - 10:30pm Belters Only 8:30pm - 9:15pm Rejjie Snow 7:15pm - 8pm Tion Wayne 6pm - 6:45pm Unknown T 4:45pm - 5:30pm EFÉ 3:45pm - 4:15pm Bailey333 2:45pm - 3:15pm	Becky Hill 9:30pm - 10:15pm slowthai 8:20pm - 9pm Kojaque 7:20pm - 8pm M Huncho 6:20pm - 7pm Coi Leray 5:20pm - 6pm Lancey Foux 4:20pm - 5pm Kneecap 3:20pm - 4pm Ivorian Doll 2:30pm - 3pm

**SPIN House Party Stage**
Friday	Saturday	Sunday
SPIN House Party 1:30pm - 9pm	SPIN House Party 1:30pm - 9pm	SPIN House Party 1:30pm - 9pm

== 2023 ==
Calvin Harris performing on the Main Stage at Longitude Festival 2023

Longitude Festival 2023 was held from Saturday 1 July to Sunday 2 July 2023.

=== Line-up ===
Line-up: (headliners in bold):

**Main Stage**
Saturday	Sunday
**Calvin Harris** 8:45pm - 10:45pm MK 7:15pm - 8:15pm Anne-Marie 6:15pm - 7pm Belters Only 5pm - 5:45pm Raye 4pm - 4:45pm Ice Spice 3pm - 3:30pm Jen Payne 2pm - 2:30pm	**Travis Scott** 9:15pm - 10:30pm Lil Uzi Vert 8pm - 8:45pm Metro Boomin 6:45pm - 7:30pm Lil Tjay 5:30pm - 6:15pm Flo 4:15pm - 5pm Glorilla - 3pm - 3:45pm Venbee - 2pm - 2:30pm

**Heineken Stage**
Saturday	Sunday
BLK. 9:15pm - 10:30pm Multunes 7:45pm - 9pm Fionn Curran 6:15pm - 7:30pm Hannah Laing 4:30pm - 6pm Jazzy 3:30pm - 4pm Chantel Kavanagh 2:15pm - 3:15pm	Joel Corry 9:15pm - 10:15pm Joey Bada$$ 8pm - 8:45pm Clavish 6:45pm - 7:30pm Meekz 5:30pm - 6:15pm Ken Carson 4:15pm - 5pm Songer 3pm - 3:45pm TraviS x Elzz 2pm - 2:30pm

**SPIN House Party Stage**
Saturday	Sunday
SPIN House Party 1:30pm - 9pm	SPIN House Party 1:30pm - 9pm

== 2024 ==
Longitude Festival 2024 was held from Saturday 29 June to Sunday 30 June 2024.

=== Line-up ===
Line-up: (headliners in bold):

**Main Stage**
Saturday	Sunday
**Central Cee** 9:45pm - 10:45pm Becky Hill 8:30pm - 9:15pm Belters Only 7pm - 8pm BLK. 5:30pm - 6:30pm Joel Corry 4pm - 5pm Jazzy 3pm - 3:30pm Dan Duffy & Dansie 2pm - 2:30pm	**Doja Cat** 9:15pm - 10:30pm 21 Savage 7:45pm - 8:45pm Sonny Fodera 6:15pm - 7:15pm D-Block Europe 5pm - 5:45pm Don Toliver - 3:45pm - 4:30pm Dan Duffy & Dansie - 2:15pm - 3:15pm

**Heineken Stage**
Saturday	Sunday
Route 94 9:15pm - 10:30pm D.O.D 8pm - 9:15pm Jen Payne 6:45pm - 8:00pm NewEra 5:30pm - 6:45pm Evan McGee 4:15pm - 5:30pm Hyyken 3pm - 4:14pm	Obskür 9pm - 10:15pm Cassö 7:45pm - 9pm Daire 6:30pm - 7:45pm CamrinWatsin 5:15pm - 6:30pm DATSKO 4pm - 5:15pm Shona Brophy 3pm - 4pm

**SPIN House Party Stag**
Saturday	Sunday
SPIN House Party 1:30pm - 8:30pm	SPIN House Party 1:30pm - 7:30pm

== 2025 ==
Longitude Festival 2025 was held on 5 July and Sunday 6 July 2024.

=== Line-up ===
Line-up: (headliners in bold):

**Main Stage**
Saturday	Sunday
**David Guetta** 9:15pm - 10:45pm Belters Only 7:40pm - 8:40pm AJ Tracey 6:15pm - 7:15pm A Boogie wit da Hoodie 5:00pm - 5:45pm Dan & Dassie 3:15pm - 4:30pm OJ Wilson 2:00pm - 3:00pm	**50 Cent** 9:15pm - 10:45pm Sonny Fodera 7:30pm - 8:30pm blk. 6:00pm - 7:00pm Hannah Laing 4:30pm - 5:30pm Dart 3:00pm - 4:00pm Dan & Dassie 1:45pm - 2:45pm

**Heineken Stage**
Saturday	Sunday
Patrick Topping 9:15pm - 10:30pm Enzo Is Burning 8:00pm - 9:15pm Black Traffic 6:45pm - 8:00pm Robbie Doherty 5:30pm - 6:45pm Danny Howard 4:15pm - 5:30pm Caz 3:00pm - 4:15pm	Meduza 9:00pm - 10:15pm D.O.D 7:45pm - 9:00pm Camrinwatsin 6:30pm - 7:45pm Flex 5:15pm - 6:30pm Bl3ss 4:00pm - 5:15pm Cody Wong 3:00pm - 4:00pm

== 2026 ==
Longitude Festival was not held in 2026. Despite it being a major event in the organizers annual calendar, they did not make any public statement as to why the festival would not be going ahead. It is clear from their event planning application they only sought permission to hold their annual Marlay Park Series Concerts and did not seek permission to hold Longitude Festival this year.

It is unknown if this is the end of Longitude or if it will carry on in 2027 as the organizers have still yet to comment on it.

== Attendance ==
Year	Attendance	Location
2013	9,500	Marlay Park, Dublin
2014	21,000	Marlay Park, Dublin
2015	21,000	Marlay Park, Dublin
2016	30,000	Marlay Park, Dublin
2017	35,000	Marlay Park, Dublin
2018	40,000	Marlay Park, Dublin
2019	40,000	Marlay Park, Dublin
2022	40,000	Marlay Park, Dublin

Attendance figures depict total attendance during each day of the festival.

40,000 is Marlay Park's maximum capacity; therefore, the festival attendance may not increase in the future.

The 2020 and 2021 festivals were cancelled due to the COVID-19 pandemic.

== See also ==
- List of hip hop music festivals
- Electric Picnic
- Life Festival
- Oxegen
- Marlay Park
