= MCD Productions =

Irish Concert & Festival Promoter

- Company type: Concert promotions
- Founder: Eamonn McCann, Denis Desmond
- Headquarters: Dún Laoghaire, Dublin, Ireland
- Owner: Denis Desmond
- Parent: Live Nation
- Website: http://mcd.ie/

MCD Productions is an Irish concert promotion company. Established in 1980, and headquartered in Dún Laoghaire, County Dublin.

== History ==
The company was founded by Eamonn McCann and Denis Desmond, the company name MCD is made up of their initials.

McCann worked as the public face of MCD organising indoor and outdoor events in Northern Ireland and in relation to bar sales at events throughout Ireland. Denis Desmond was the public face for outdoor events in the Republic of Ireland.

== Events and festivals ==
The company has hosted U2 before 246,000 over 3 shows in Croke Park, 135,000 for Robbie Williams 2003 and 107,000 for Red Hot Chili Peppers 2004 in the Phoenix Park, to bringing together David Bowie, Placebo and Talvin Singh for an event in Dublin. Other international acts promoted by MCD in Ireland in the past include Madonna, the Rolling Stones, Radiohead, Celine Dion, Bon Jovi, David Bowie and Fleetwood Mac.

MCD produced the opening and the closing ceremony for the Special Olympics 2003 World Games in Croke Park, the home of the GAA. The company was responsible for the gala Millennium Eve event in December 2000 in Dublin's Merrion Square. MCD was also the promoter responsible for the 1999 MTV Europe Music Awards held in Dublin that year.

MCD Productions has also managed several music festivals, including Longitude Festival, Heineken Green Energy, Oxegen, and V2005 (England).

== Venues ==
MCD Productions, owned by Live Nation, are the parent company of English promoter Festival Republic and as such have an interest in festivals such as Reading and Leeds Festivals.

MCD Productions (as a subsidiary of Live Nation) owns and operates a number of venues including The Olympia, The Gaiety, The Ambassador and The Academy. The Gaiety and Olympia Theatres both play host to the annual Dublin Theatre Festival.

== Controversies ==
Smashing Pumpkins 1996

Tragedy struck at The Point in Dublin on 11 May 1996, when a 17-year-old fan, Bernadette O'Brien was crushed to death during a Smashing Pumpkins concert. At the time, MCD released a statement saying that "Saturday night's concert was organised in accordance with the Code of Practice for Pop Concerts, recently issued by the Department of Education."

=== Féile slander 1995–2000 ===
MCD objected to a coroner's comments about the death of a young man due to a slip and a fall into the River Lee at their Féile Festival in August 1995. The case was settled out of the court with the coroner making a contribution to the ISPCC.

=== Rod Stewart, 2005 ===
Following one incident where a fan suffered whiplash after being struck by a football at Rod Stewart in 2005 the promoter was forced to pay €15,000. The ball struck the fan directly on the crown of her head, knocking her off her feet, injuring her neck and shoulders, leading to concussion and causing her continual headaches. She had to be taken aside and treated by medics.

=== Oxegen 2006 ===
The firm are involved in a legal dispute with an Irish company, boards.ie ltd, over claims users on boards.ie had made about the camp site at Oxegen 2006. Users' claims include alleged random violence and widespread tent burning at the event campsite A, claims that MCD deny. Campsite A was renamed the Red Campsite from Oxegen 2007 onwards.

A sticky notice was placed at the top of every discussion forum on boards.ie warning members not to create posts mentioning MCD or any events hosted by MCD The Boards warning notice was removed 30 May 2009.

=== Barbra Streisand, 2007 ===
MCD's July 2007 Barbra Streisand concert in Celbridge, County Kildare was marred by organisational issues compounded by poor weather and the fact that venue has poor access in the first place. Others reported that no stewards were present to lead concert-goers to their seats and when they found their seats they were already occupied.

=== Prince, 2008 ===
MCD's June 2008 Prince concert in Croke Park was cancelled when 55,000 tickets sold out. MCD sued the performer for €1.66 million, however the case was settled for an undisclosed amount in February 2010. When this settlement was not implemented MCD were able to secure a court order allowing it to pursue Prince throughout the EU for €2.2 million.

=== AC/DC, 2009 ===
MCD's AC/DC concert at Punchestown Racecourse on 28 June 2009 was controversial. Reports were common of long queues, lack of lighting at exits, too few stewards, barriers being pushed over and fans, forced into walking 10 kilometres to the concert, later expressing their rage against organisers MCD Productions for failing to ensure roads were clear.

=== Guns N' Roses, 2010 ===
A Guns N' Roses concert in the O2 was controversial, when Axl Rose stormed off stage 22 minutes into the show, due to booing and plastic bottles being thrown. They had arrived on stage at 10:25pm in a venue that has a 11pm curfew. They later returned to stage after a 40-minute delay (with the house lights on), and played until 12:52am. Despite protests, MCD refused to offer refunds to fans.

=== Swedish House Mafia 2012 ===
MCD's Swedish House Mafia concert in Phoenix Park was hit with severe criticism and anger as it involved violence throughout, this included 1 death, widespread fights and at least two people missing for up to 24 hours, and 12 stabbings, of which 7 were from the one person.

=== Longitude Festival 2019 ===
The US Embassy in Ireland issued a security alert to notify US citizens that they should avoid going to Longitude Festival 2019 in Marlay Park, noting that there was a "potential for violence". The festival promoters response to the US Embassies warning was that it is "beyond ridiculous".
