= Love Not Riots =

Love Not Riots was a campaign aimed at reducing riots and violence that have become commonplace at festivals in the UK. It targeted the Reading and Leeds Festivals and Download festivals. It was officially endorsed by festival organisers Festival Republic, and supported by numerous celebrities and bands including ¡Forward, Russia!, The Automatic, The Subways, The Cribs, Goldie Lookin' Chain, and Giant Drag.
