= George Marlay =

Anglo-Irish Anglican priest

George Marlay (1691 – 13 April 1763) was an Anglo-Irish Anglican priest in the eighteenth century: he was Bishop of Dromore from 1745 until 1763. He gave his name to Marlay Park, which is now a popular amenity in south Dublin.

== Biography ==
He was born at Creevagh Beg, near Ballymahon, County Longford, the fourth son of Anthony Marlay and Elizabeth Morgan. His father was originally from Newcastle-upon-Tyne, and was a son of the English Civil War hero Sir John Marlay. His mother came from a long-established landowning family in County Sligo. Thomas Marlay, Lord Chief Justice of Ireland, was his brother. Thomas was the father of Richard Marlay, Bishop of Waterford and the soldier Colonel Thomas Marlay, and grandfather of the noted statesman Henry Grattan.

Marlay was educated at Trinity College, Dublin. He was consecrated as a priest in 1745. He was Prebendary of Raphoe and Rector of Louth.

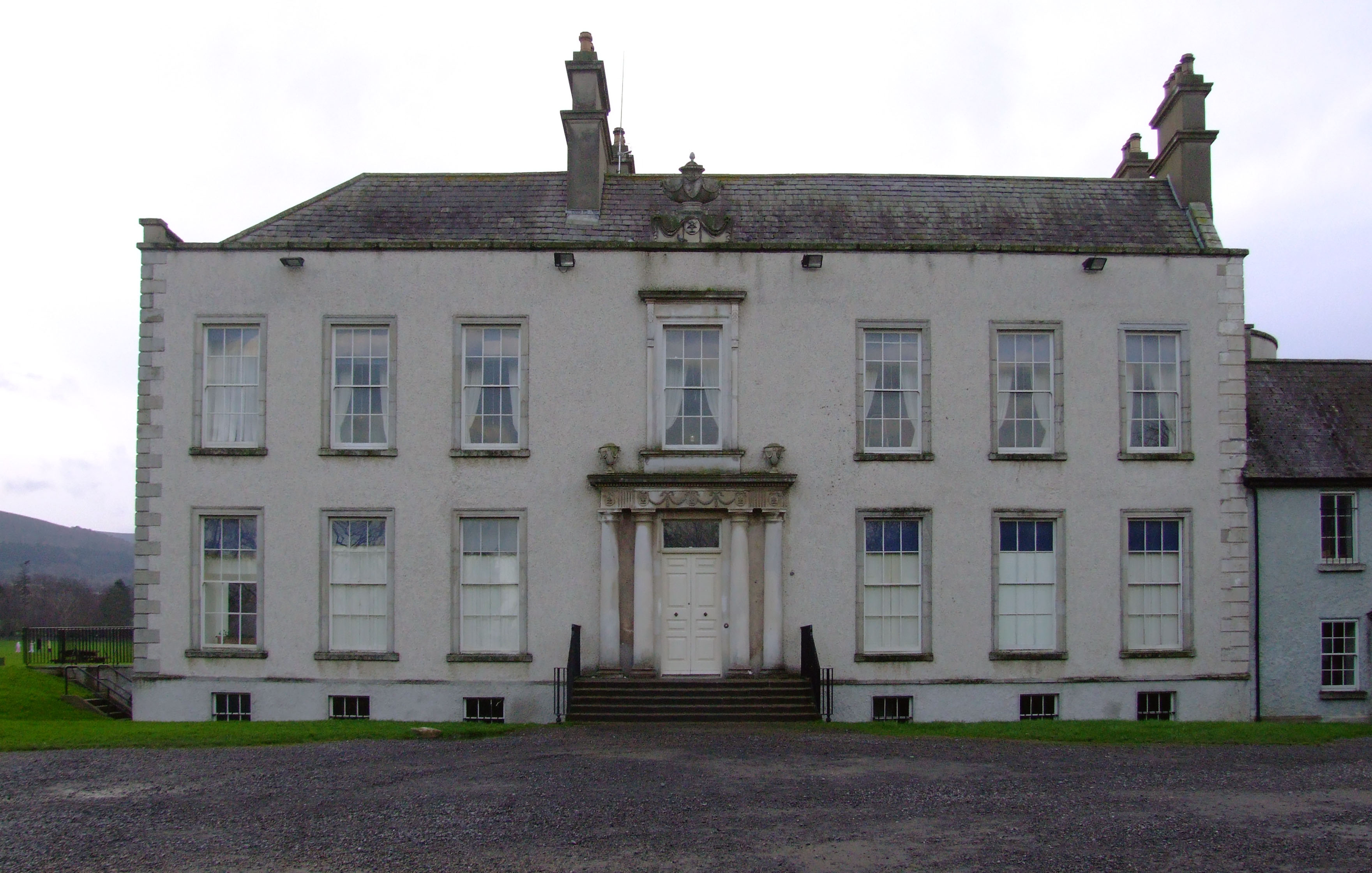
Marlay House, built by the Bishop's son-in-law David La Touche

He married Elizabeth Dunleavy and had two children, George and Elizabeth.

George was an army officer, who fought in the American War of Independence, and was captured after the Battle of Saratoga. He married Lady Catherine Butler, daughter of Brinsley Butler, 2nd Earl of Lanesborough by Lady Jane Rochford (daughter of Robert Rochfort, 1st Earl of Belvedere).

Elizabeth married the leading banker David La Touche, who became the first Governor of the Bank of Ireland. David built an impressive house south of Dublin city, which he named Marlay House in honour of his wife's family. Today it is in public ownership and a popular amenity for Dubliners and tourists alike.

Marlay died on 13 April 1763.
