= Brave Giant =

Irish band

- Origin: County Longford, Ireland
- Genres: Indie; Folk; Pop; Alternative Rock
- Years active: 2011 - 2022, 2026 - present
- Label: Brave Giant
- Members: Podge Gill; Mark Prunty
- Past members: Ross McNerney; Emmett Collum

Brave Giant are an Irish indie/folk band from County Longford, which consist of Podge Gill (lead vocalist, electric guitar, acoustic guitar), Mark Prunty (lead vocalist, bass guitar, acoustic guitar).

The band had released, One studio EP, The Lordy Lordy - EP (2016), One studio album, White, Pink + Blue (2019) and five studio singles; "The Time I Met The Devil" (2017), "Way To Love" (2017), "Dakota" (2018),"More Beast Than Beauty" (2018) and "Somebody's Someone" (2018).

The EP peaked at number two on the iTunes Store album charts, whilst "The Time I Met The Devil" and "Way To Love" peaked at number five and number one on the iTunes Store Single Charts respectively. The music video for The Time I Met The Devil received three nominations in the Kinsale Shark Awards for Best Music Video, Best Low Budget Music Video and Best Director.

The band had appeared on Irish TV's The Late Late Show with a performance of "The Time I Met The Devil". The band has also released a mashup of Bob Marley's "Is This Love" and Daft Punk's "Digital Love" on YouTube, which has over 100,000 views and it went onto win the 2016 Apple Of My Eye Le Crunch song competition. They have played at festivals including Electric Picnic, Longitude, Indiependence, Into The Wild and B.A.R.E in the Woods. The band also performed at half time at the 2018 All-Ireland Senior Hurling Championship Final at Croke Park.

On 8 May 2020, Brave Giant announced through their social media, that they are disbanding, after 9 years together.

On 19 August 2022, Brave Giant performed their last live event (The Last Dance) at the Marquee in Drumlish, County Longford.

On 2 May 2026, Brave Giant announced that their reforming, thorough the band's official social media, with a performance at the Marquee in Drumlish, County Longford. The reformed lineup would feature two of the four original band members, with Ross McNerney (banjo, mandolin, vocalist) continuing as a member of Amble and Emmet Collum (drums, vocalist) pursuing solo projects.

== History ==
In December 2011, Mark Prunty and Podge Gill formed a band called "Dutch Courage", their first gig was in their local bars, at their friends 21st birthday. In the months, they began to get more gigs and started to get a good reputation for themselves in their home county.

In March 2013, they were approached by Ross McNerney and joined their band. Shortly after, the three members decided to change their band name to "Poroma", as they wanted to direct their band to write their own material and their own unique sound. This is when their band started to get a good reputation for themselves outside their jurisdiction.

In August 2014, Emmet Collum filled in as the drummer for their show at the Marquee Festival in Drumlish, after their show, Emmett Collum turned down his opportunity to return to the United States, as he saw a better opportunity with the band in Ireland. Just months after, David Kilbride joined the band, as a bass player, to complete their full line-up.

Once their band had taken their final form, they decided to change their name to "Brave Giant" as the band was now completely different to the one that Mark Prunty and Podge Gill had shaped.

== Discography ==
=== Albums ===
Title	Details	Peak chart positions
Title	Details	IRE
White, Pink + Blue	Released: 4 October 2019; Formats: Digital download, streaming	12

=== Extended plays ===
Title	Details
The Lordy Lordy	Released: 28 April 2016; Formats: Download

=== Singles ===
Year	Title
March 2017	"The Time I Met the Devil"
October 2017	"Way to Love"
April 2018	"Dakota"
June 2018	"More Beast Than Beauty"
