= Pádraig McMahon =

Irish Gaelic footballer

Padraig McMahon
Personal information
- Native name: Padraig Mac Mathúna (Irish)
- Born: 14 July 1984 (age 42) Portlaoise, County Laois

Sport
- Sport: Gaelic football
- Position: Left half back
Club
- Years: Club
- Ballyroan Abbey
Club titles
- Laois titles: 1
Inter-county
- Years: County
- 2005-present: Laois

Padraig McMahon is a Gaelic footballer from County Laois.

He usually plays at left half back for Laois.

He played Under 21 for Laois in 2005 and also broke onto the senior team that same year.

In 2006, he starred as Ballyroan Gaels won the Laois Senior Football Championship, having captained Ballyroan to the Kelly Cup title in 2004.

McMahon captained the Laois senior football team in 2010. On 13 June 2010 he scored a goal in the Leinster Senior Football Championship quarter-final against Meath at Croke Park, helping Laois force a draw after extra time and a subsequent replay.
