= Chasing Abbey =

Irish pop band

- Origin: Tullamore, County Offaly, Ireland
- Genres: Irish trad, electronic, alternative rock
- Years active: 2016–present
- Label: Culchie Kid Records
- Members: Ronan Bell; Jonathan Byrne; Ted Conway
- Website: chasingabbey.ie

Chasing Abbey are an Irish music group combining electronic production with influences from traditional Irish music. They formed in Tullamore, Ireland, in 2016 and the group consists of members Ronan Bell, Jonathan Byrne and Ted Conway. The trio first gained attention with their debut single "That Good Thing" in 2017, securing the band a record deal with 3 Beat UK and Universal Music Group. Their next EP, The Oddessy Project, debuted at number one on the Irish Music Charts in 2019. Following the release of their song "Oh My Johnny" in 2023, Chasing Abbey signed a record deal with Warner and dance label Spinnin' Records. Their debut album, Cyber Celt, was released on 18th September 2026.

== History ==
Longtime childhood friends Ronan Bell, Jonathan Byrne, and Ted Conway make up Chasing Abbey, all multi-instrumentalists and producers working out of their studio, Penthouse Productions, in Tullamore. In 2015, music teacher Stacy Hogan at Coláiste Choilm in Tullamore suggested that Leaving Certificate students Jonathan Byrne and Ted Conway should enter a radio talent competition. After recruiting Ronan Bell, from a class three years below them, they began working on music. After some time, Chasing Abbey was the result of their teacher's suggestion.

Formed in 2016, Chasing Abbey's debut single "That Good Thing" amassed millions of streams. The debut track reached the iTunes download chart in Ireland and was the most Shazamed song in the country. They went on to win RTÉ's Choice Music Prize for Song of the Year, and secured the band a global record deal with 3 Beat UK and Universal Music Group.

Chasing Abbey's second release "Talk to Me" received significant radio play and became the official track for the Football Association of Ireland in 2018. May 2018 saw the group release their third single "Choices", which reached number one in the charts within hours of its release. Chasing Abbey played to crowds supporting The Chainsmokers and Rita Ora at Dublin's RDS Arena and performed at the Longitude Festival that year.

2019 saw Chasing Abbey release their debut EP The Odyssey Project, which reached number one on the Irish Music Charts. It was positively reviewed on Billboard, citing Chasing Abbey as a "juggernaut trio from Ireland" and "consummate underdogs" and describing their music as "pop shimmer".

In 2020, the release of "Lately" saw Chasing Abbey reach number one on the Official Homegrown charts in Ireland and number one on the Shazam charts.

2023 saw Chasing Abbey release "Lie" and their hit song "Oh My Johnny (Banks of the Roses)". It entered the Top 10 Irish Charts and was then certified platinum. The trio performed the song on The Late Late Show, increasing streams within the following week by 38%. The single stayed at number one in the Irish Homegrown chart for seven consecutive weeks, amassing over 2.1 million streams in Ireland. Following the song's success, Chasing Abbey signed a worldwide record deal with Warner Music and dance label Spinnin' Records.

2026 saw Chasing Abbey start their worldwide tour. This tour was kicked off in Dublin, Ireland on 17 September, 2026 playing to their largest-to-date crowd at Dublin's Vicar Street. At midnight on 18 September 2026, Chasing Abbey released their debut album Cyber Celt.

== Discography ==
=== Singles ===
Year	Single	Peak chart positions	Album
Year	Single	IRE	Album
2016	"That Good Thing"	–	Non-album singles
2017	"Talk to Me"	–	Non-album singles
2018	"Choices"	–	Non-album singles
2019	"Hold On"	–	Non-album singles
2020	"Lately"	26	Non-album singles
2022	"Hometown"	–	Non-album singles
2023	"Oh My Johnny (Banks of the Roses)"	6	Non-album singles
2023	"Learning to Dance (Lanigan's Ball)"	–	Non-album singles
2025	"Take Me to the Water"	–	Non-album singles
2025	"Arís Is Arís"	–	Cyber Celt
2025	"Gorta"	–	Cyber Celt
2025	"Íorónta"	–	Cyber Celt
2025	"Scartha"	–	Cyber Celt
2026	"T.a.L."	72	Cyber Celt
2026	"Saoirse Saoirse"	–	Cyber Celt
2026	"Seachain"	–	Cyber Celt
2026	"Greedy Pigs"	–	Cyber Celt
"—" denotes single that did not chart or was not released.
