= Festival Republic =

UK music festival company

- Type: Private limited company
- Industry: Music promoter
- Founded: 1982; 44 years ago
- Headquarters: 2nd Floor, Regent Arcade House, 19–25 Argyll Street, London, W1F 7TS,
- Key people: Melvin Benn (Director); Denis Desmond (Director); Stuart Douglas (Director); Paul Latham (Director); Elizabeth Willard (Director)
- Website: www.festivalrepublic.com

Festival Republic is a UK music promoter. It was founded as Mean Fiddler Group in 1982 by Irish-born chairman John Vincent Power, as a venue-management and music-promotion group. After the group was taken over by Hamsard Ltd in 2005, the focus became more concentrated on festivals, and in 2007 the venues along with the Mean Fiddler name were sold on, with the remaining company being renamed Festival Republic. Melvin Benn is the current managing director.

== History ==
The group was founded in 1982 by Irish-born chairman John Vincent Power, with a venue called simply Mean Fiddler. At the end of the 1980s they took control of the Reading Festival from Harold Pendleton, beginning a move into festivals. After acquiring the LA2 in Charing Cross Road in 2000, they were renamed to become the Mean Fiddler Music Group.

In April 2005, they accepted a takeover bid from Hamsard Ltd, a co-operative company 50.1% owned by Live Nation UK (formerly the entertainment division of Clear Channel UK but now part of Live Nation International) and 49.9% owned by Irish event organiser MCD.

In 2006, the Mean Fiddler Music Group reduced its touring and promotion activities to concentrate on running festivals. It maintained control of the Reading and Leeds festivals and announced a new addition, Latitude Festival.

In 2007, the Mean Fiddler Music Group was sold along with several venues to Mama Group Plc in order to allow Festival Republic to concentrate fully on promoting festivals. As part of the sale, Mama Group acquired the rights to the Mean Fiddler trademark.

== Festival promotion and production ==
Festival Republic's flagship events are the Reading and Leeds Festivals. These are a pair of annual events which take place simultaneously on the Friday, Saturday and Sunday of the August bank holiday weekend, sharing the same bill. In addition they also run the Latitude Festival in Suffolk, the Wireless Festival and the Community Festival in London, EDC UK in Milton Keynes, and the Download Festival in Leicestershire. They also produce a BBC Proms In The Park and BBC Radio 2 Live In Hyde Park, which both take place on the same weekend in September in London's Hyde Park.

In Ireland, they organise the Longitude Festival and Electric Picnic. In Norway, they run the Hove Festival. In Germany they have expanded from running the Berlin Festival to running the first European Lollapalooza. They have previously been responsible for Big Chill festival, which last ran in 2011, and were the operators of the Glastonbury Festival from 2002 until 2012.

On 30 March 2026, Wireless announced that Ye, also known as Kanye West, would be the headlining artist for all three nights of the 2026 festival, marking West's first UK performance since headlining Glastonbury in 2015. The selection drew criticism from the Jewish Leadership Council and London mayor Sadiq Khan due to West's history of antisemitic remarks. On 5 April, PepsiCo announced that they were withdrawing sponsorship for the event, citing West's antisemitic comments. The same day, UK prime minister Keir Starmer stated it was "deeply concerning" that West was booked to perform at the festival. On 6 April, other sponsors withdrew support for Wireless, including PayPal, while the UK government confirmed a review of West's right to enter the UK, with several members of parliament in opposition to West's appearance.

Melvin Benn defended West's planned appearance. Benn argued West's antisemitic remarks were comparable to behaviour he encountered in other individuals with mental illness, attributed it to West's bipolar disorder, and stated West considers his previous behaviour "abhorrent". Benn, who lived on a kibbutz in the 1970s, urged others to "reflect on their instant comments of disgust at the likelihood of [West] performing (as was mine) and offer some forgiveness and hope to him as I have decided to do". On 7 April, the Home Office denied West's Electronic Travel Authorisation application (which was initially approved) to travel to the UK, stating, "[West's] presence would not be conducive to the public good". The organisers subsequently cancelled the festival and announced ticket refunds, also stating, "As with every Wireless Festival, multiple stakeholders were consulted in advance of booking [West] and no concerns were highlighted at the time", with Benn later claiming PepsiCo "signed off and approved" West's appearance.

Later, Festival Republic shared a statement by West, where he wrote, "My only goal is to come to London and present a show of change, bringing unity, peace, and love through my music. I would be grateful for the opportunity to meet with members of the Jewish community in the UK in person, to listen. I know words aren't enough – I'll have to show change through my actions. If you're open, I'm here".

== Former festivals ==
- Big Chill Festival (2010–2011)
- Eroica (2018 formerly V Festival South)
- V Festivals (2017)
- T in the Park (2016)

== Former venues ==
- London Astoria
- London Forum
- Mean Fiddler
- Jazz Café
- The Garage
- The Borderline
- The Grand
- The Old Fiddler
- The Crossbar
- The Complex
- Media
- Point 101
- Powers Bar
- Ion Bar
- Bartok
- The Z Bar
