= Ward Park =

Park in Bangor, County Down, Northern Ireland

Coordinates: 54.659°N 5.660°W

Ward Park is situated in Bangor, County Down, Northern Ireland. The 37-acre park contains 10 tennis courts, a duck pond and a selection of wildfowl housed in breeding pens.

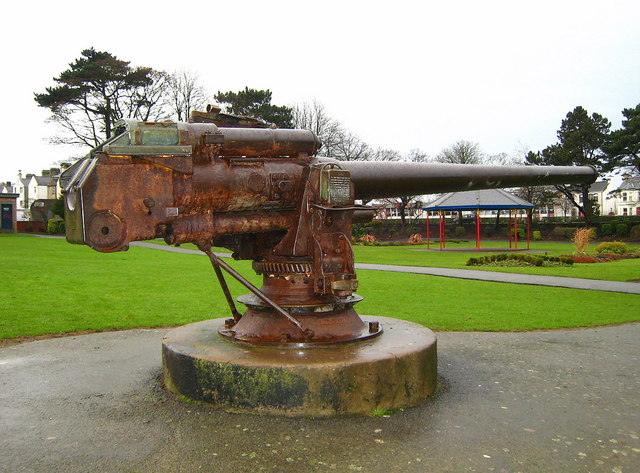
U-19's gun today

In the park there is a large war memorial and also located nearby is the main gun from the German U-19 U-boat built for the Imperial German Navy. This war relic was donated to the people of Bangor, by the Admiralty in recognition of the valorous conduct of Commander The Hon. Edward Bingham whilst on board HMS Nestor while fighting in the Battle of Jutland in July 1916, for which he received the Victoria Cross.
