= Reading and Leeds Festivals =

Pair of annual music festivals in England

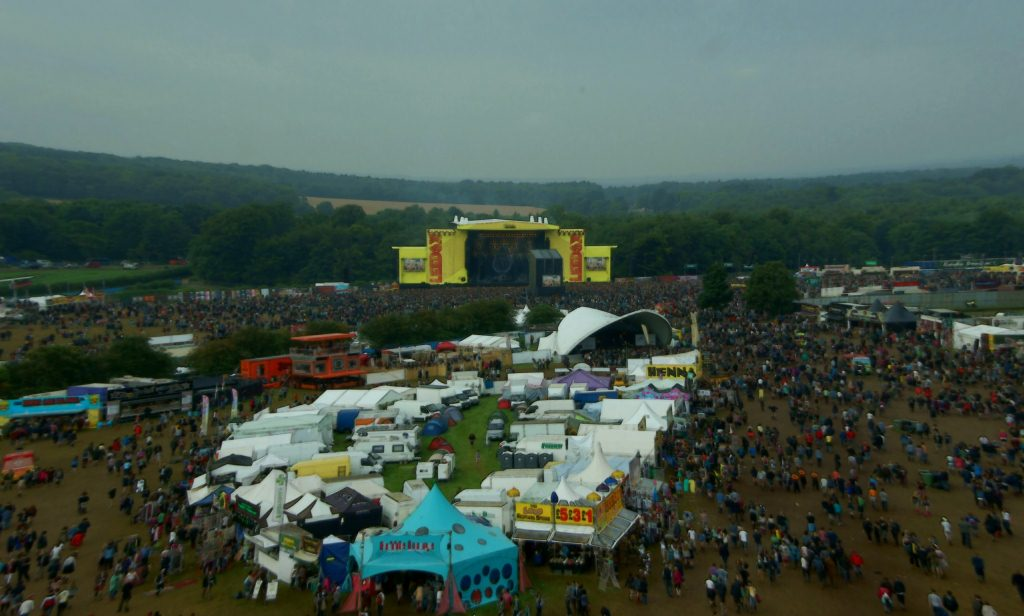
- Leeds Festival Site in 2012
- Genre: Alternative; rock; metal; hip hop; dance; pop
- Dates: August bank holiday
- Locations: Reading and Leeds, England: Beaulieu Jazz Festival (1955–1961); Various as National Jazz Festival (1961–1970); Reading (since 1971); Also at Leeds (since 1999)
- Years active: 1955–present (except 2020)
- Attendance: 105,000 (2019, daily)
- Website: readingfestival.com leedsfestival.com

The Reading and Leeds Festivals are a pair of annual music festivals that take place in Reading and Leeds in England. The events take place simultaneously on the Friday, Saturday and Sunday of the August bank holiday weekend. The Reading Festival is held at Little John's Farm on Richfield Avenue in central Reading, near Caversham Bridge. The Leeds event is held in Bramham Park, near Wetherby, the grounds of a historic house. Headliners and most supporting acts typically play at both sites, with Reading's Friday line up becoming Leeds' Saturday line-up, Reading's Saturday line-up playing at Leeds on Sunday, and Leeds' Friday line-up attending Reading on Sunday. Campsites are available at both sites and weekend tickets include camping. Day tickets are also sold.

The Reading Festival, the older of the two festivals, is the longest-running popular music festival in the UK. Many of the biggest bands in the UK and internationally have played at the festival over five decades. The festival has had various musical phases over the years, but since the current two-site format was adopted in 1999, rock, indie, alternative, punk, and metal have been the main genres featured in the line-up. More recently hip-hop has comprised an increasing proportion of the lineup, including headline sets by artists such as Kendrick Lamar, Travis Scott, Eminem and Post Malone.

The festivals are run by Festival Republic, which was divested from Mean Fiddler Music Group. From 1998 to 2007, the festivals were known as the Carling Weekend: Reading and the Carling Weekend: Leeds for promotional purposes. In November 2007, the sponsored title was abolished after nine years and the Reading Festival reclaimed its original name. In 2011, the capacity of the Reading site was 87,000, and the Leeds site was 75,000, an increase of several thousand on previous years.

== History ==
=== 1960s ===
The Reading Festival was originally known as the National Jazz Festival, which was conceived by Harold Pendleton (founder of the Marquee Club in London in 1958) and first held at Richmond Athletic Ground in 1961. Throughout the 1960s, the festival moved between several London and Home Counties sites, being held at Windsor Racecourse, Kempton Park, Sunbury and Plumpton, before reaching its permanent home at Reading in 1971. Since 1964, when the festival added a Friday evening session to the original Saturday and Sunday format, it has been staged over three days, with the sole exception of 1970 when a fourth day was added, running from Thursday 6 to Sunday 9 August.

The National Jazz Federation (NJF) Festival was established at the height of the trad jazz boom, as a successor to the Beaulieu Jazz Festival, initially as a two-day event held at Richmond Athletic Ground. The line-up for the first two years was made up exclusively of jazz performers, but in 1963, several rhythm & blues acts were added to the bill, including the Rolling Stones, Georgie Fame, and Long John Baldry, and by 1965, such acts were in the majority, with jazz sessions reduced to Saturday and Sunday afternoons only. This format continued until 1967 when jazz was limited to just the Saturday afternoon session. By 1969, jazz had disappeared entirely from the line-up.

In 1964, a Friday evening session was added to the existing weekend format. In 1966, the NJF Festival moved to the larger Windsor Racecourse. The following year a second stage (the Marquee Stage) was added, but when the festival was moved to Sunbury in 1968 it reverted to a single-stage format. The festival was held at Plumpton Racecourse in 1969 and 1970.

=== 1970s ===
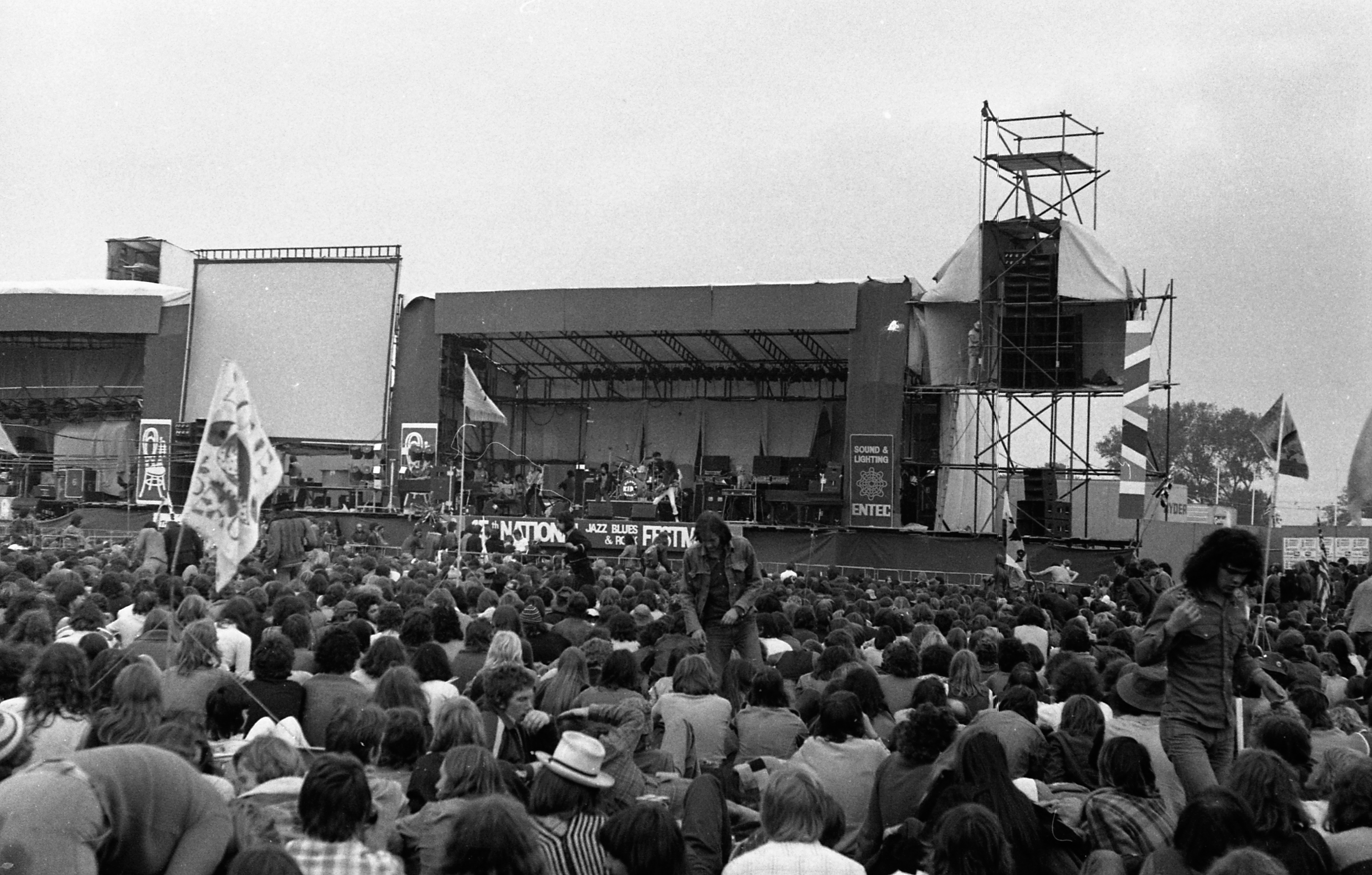
Reading Festival 1975

After moving to Reading, the festival's line-up became primarily composed of progressive rock, blues and hard rock during the early and mid 1970s, and then became the first music festival to incorporate punk rock and new wave in the late 1970s, when the Jam, Sham 69, and the Stranglers were among the headline acts. The festival's attempts to cater for both traditional rock acts and punk and new wave bands occasionally led to clashes between the two sets of fans at the end of the 1970s, though the festival gradually became known for focusing on heavy metal and rock acts.

=== 1980s ===
During the 1980s, the festival followed a similar format to that established in the late 1970s, with leading rock and heavy metal acts performing on the last two days, and a more varied line-up including punk and new wave bands on the opening day.

==== Council ban ====
In 1984 and 1985, the Conservative-run local council effectively banned the festival by designating the festival site for development and refusing to grant licences for any alternative sites in the Reading area.

In 1984, many acts were already booked and tickets were on sale, with Marillion due to headline. The promoters tried in vain to find a new site but a proposed move to Lilford Hall in Northamptonshire failed. The proposed line-up was published in Soundcheck free music paper issue 12 as: Friday 24 August – Hawkwind, Boomtown Rats, Snowy White, the Playn Jayn, Dumpy's Rusty Nuts, Wildfire, Chelsea Eloy, Tracy Lamb, New Torpedoes; Saturday 25 – Jethro Tull, Hanoi Rocks, Steve Hackett, Club Karlsson, Nazareth, Twelfth Night, Thor, Silent Running, New Model Army, IQ, the Roaring Boys, She; Sunday 26 – Marillion, Grand Slam, the Bluebells, Helix, Clannad, the Opposition, the Enid, Young Blood, Scorched Earth, and Terraplane).

After Labour regained control of the council in 1986, permission was given for fields adjacent to the original festival site to be used, and a line-up was put together at short notice.

The following year saw a record attendance, headlined by the Mission, Alice Cooper and Status Quo.

==== Late 1980s / early 1990s slump ====
1988 saw an attempt to take the festival in a mainstream commercial pop direction, featuring acts including Starship, Squeeze, Hothouse Flowers, Bonnie Tyler and Meat Loaf (who was bottled off stage), and the subsequent disputes led to the ousting of original festival promoter Harold Pendleton by the Mean Fiddler Music Group organisation.

Pendleton attempted to relocate the festival to a new site near Newbury using the name "Redding Festival", but threats of legal action by the new promoters of the original festival, as well as a reluctance by Newbury District Council to issue a licence for the proposed Newbury Showground venue, blocked Pendleton's plans. Meanwhile, the official Reading Festival, now managed by Mean Fiddler, continued at the Thames-side site in Reading, with a predominantly goth and indie music policy that alienated much of the traditional fan base and saw attendances plummet.

Attendances continued to fall between 1989 and 1991, but began to recover from 1992, when new organisers took over from the Mean Fiddler group, broadening the festival's musical policy.

=== 1990s ===
In 1991, Nirvana made the first of their two appearances at Reading, midway down the bill. The following year, in 1992, they played what would be their last UK concert, which was released as a live album/DVD Live at Reading in November 2009. Singer Kurt Cobain came onstage in a wheelchair pushed by music journalist Everett True and wearing a medical gown, parodying speculations about his mental health. The 1992 festival was hit by extreme weather, with a thunderstorm on the Saturday drenching the site, leaving it ankle-deep in mud, and blowing away the Comedy Tent.

==== Festival expansion ====
By the mid-1990s, the festival had begun to regain its former status as the popularity of UK outdoor festivals increased. Britpop and indie began to appear on the bill alongside the traditional rock and metal acts, and rap acts such as Ice Cube began to appear regularly on the main stage, to mixed receptions. Public Enemy headlined the second day of the 1992 festival. Beastie Boys were about halfway down the bill for day three.

In 1996, the Stone Roses played the last gig before their break-up at the festival.

In 1998, the Reading Festival absorbed the failed Phoenix Festival, resulting in an on-stage dispute between Beastie Boys and the Prodigy over the song "Smack My Bitch Up".

In 1999, the festival added a second venue at Temple Newsam in Leeds, the site of V Festival in 1997 and 1998, due to increasing demand. In the first year, all bands performed at the Leeds site the day after they played Reading, with the Reading Festival running from Friday to Sunday and the Leeds Festival running from Saturday to Monday. However, in 2001, the festival moved to the current format, wherein the Reading line-up plays at Leeds the following day, with the opening day line-up from Leeds playing the final day in Reading (with the exceptions of 2009 and 2010 when the bands playing Leeds played Reading the following day, and the bands on the opening day of Reading closed Leeds).

=== 2000s ===
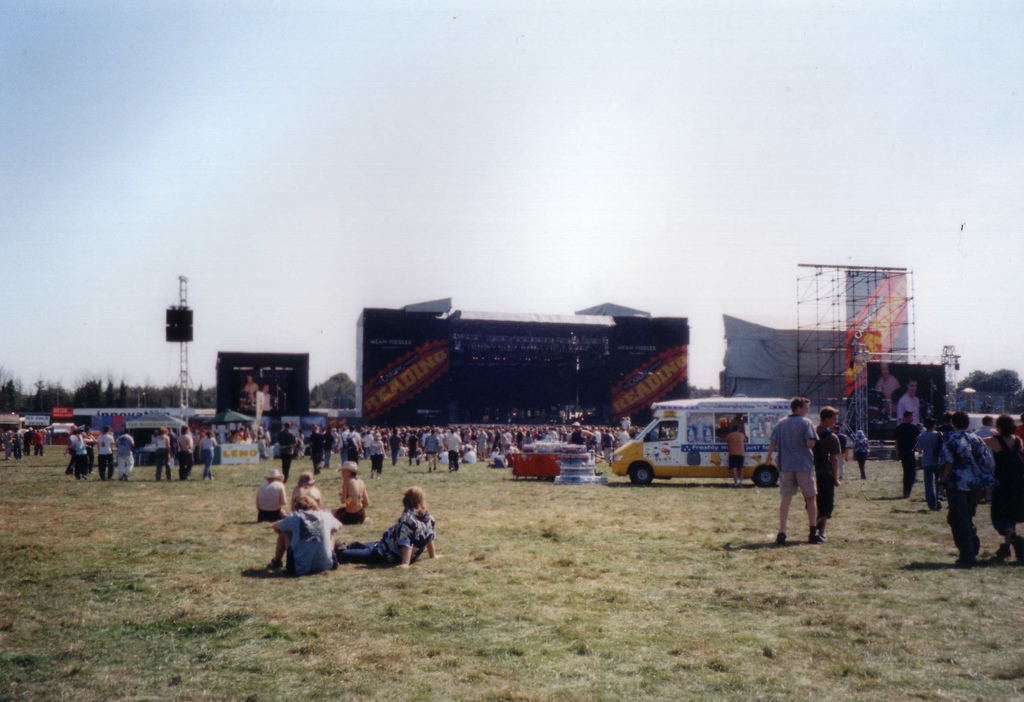
The main stage of the 2000 Reading Festival

After a successful first year in Leeds, the increasing popularity of outdoor music festivals led to the Reading Festival selling out quicker every year. However, the Leeds Festival was plagued by riots and violence, which led to problems in retaining its licence. The worst incidents occurred in 2002, following which the festival was moved to Bramham Park north-east of Leeds. Since then, security at both sites has increased and problems have been reduced.

The early 2000s saw a varied but predominantly rock line-up, though as the decade progressed the Main Stage and Radio 1 Stage featured many indie bands.

Despite being predominantly a rock festival, several hip-hop artists have appeared at the festival over the years, including Cypress Hill, Ice Cube, Beastie Boys, Eminem, Xzibit, Jay-Z, 50 Cent, Dizzee Rascal, and the Streets.

In 2005, the main stages at both Reading and Leeds were made larger, featuring cantilevered video screens. The same year the Reading Fringe Festival was established in Reading, with venues in the town hosting acts hoping to draw crowds and industry figures from the larger festival. The Reading Fringe has run annually since then.

==== Banning of flags and banners ====
Flags were banned from both festival sites in 2009, with the organisers citing health and safety concerns. Flags and banners had been a traditional part of the Reading Festival since the early 1970s, originally used to enable motorcycle groups and others to identify themselves and find each other inside the main arena.

=== 2010s ===
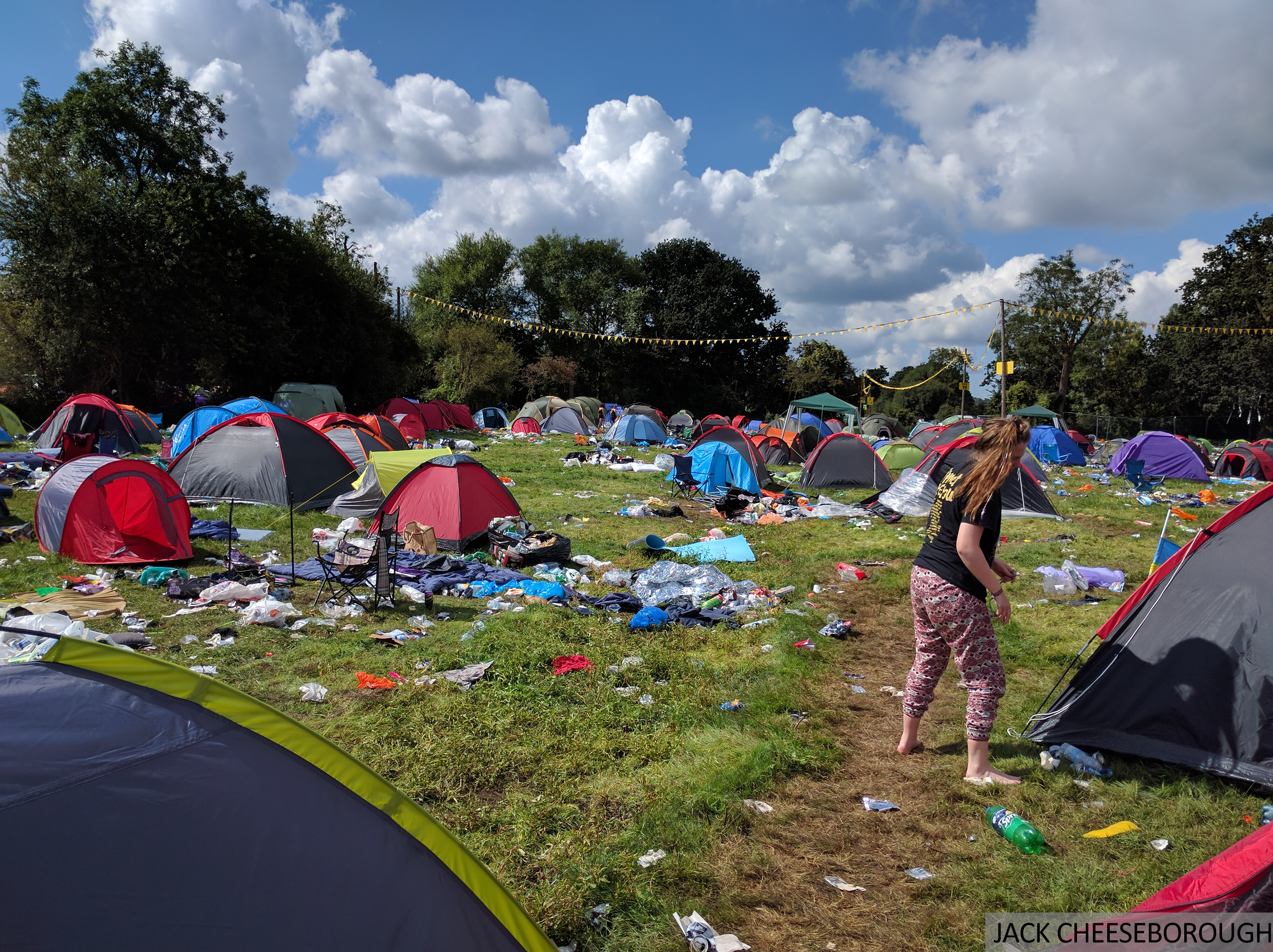
Campsite Aftermath, 2016

Reading Festival continued to expand through the early 2010s, with a new record capacity of 105,000 recorded in 2019. In the same year, 200 artists played at both festivals.

The festival typically has the following stages:

- Main Stage – major rock, indie, metal and alternative acts.
- NME/Radio 1 stage – less well-known acts, building up to an alternative headline act.
- Dance tent – dance music acts, previously sharing a day with the Lock Up stage, now a stand-alone 3-day stage.
- Lock Up Stage (also known as Pit Stage) – underground punk and hardcore acts. Due to demand, from 2006 this stage took up two days rather than previous years where it was only one day.
- Festival Republic stage – acts with less popular appeal and breakthrough acts.
- 1Xtra Stage – new stage for 2013 that stages Hip-Hop, RnB and Rap artists.
- Alternative tent – comedy and cabaret acts plus DJs.
- BBC Introducing Stage – Typically unsigned/not well known acts. (Formerly known as the Topman Unsigned Stage at the Leeds site).
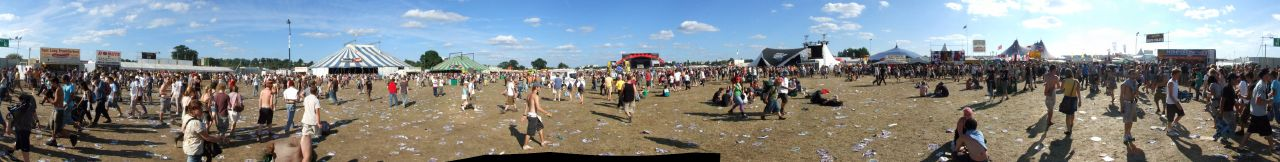
A panorama of the Reading Festival 2007 arena

=== 2020s ===
On 12 May 2020, it was announced that the year's festivals were cancelled due to the ongoing COVID-19 pandemic. The festivals were due to host Rage Against the Machine's first UK show in 10 years, along with Stormzy's and Liam Gallagher's first appearances as headliners. The 2021 festival included two main stages with six headliners, among them Stormzy and Liam Gallagher from the previous year's line up.

In 2022, Festival Republic came under fire following a number of incidents at both festival sites. At Reading, multiple fires were reported, as well as mugs, chairs, cups and other objects being thrown. Stabbings were also reported. At Leeds, 16-year-old David Celino died after it was suspected he had taken ecstasy.

In 2026, the festivals underwent a significant redesign of the staging and arena, with the Main Stage renamed the Grid and several new stages introduced. The Leeds festival also expanded to the Thursday for the first time, with Kasabian as the inaugural Thursday headliner.

== List of headliners ==
- 2026: Charli XCX, Dave, Raye, Chase & Status, Florence and the Machine, Fontaines D.C.The 2026 festival took place from 27 to 30 August.
- 2025: Travis Scott, Bring Me the Horizon, Hozier, Chappell Roan
- 2024: Blink-182, Fred Again, Liam Gallagher, Lana Del Rey, Catfish and the Bottlemen, Gerry Cinnamon
- 2023: Sam Fender, Foals, the Killers, the 1975 (replacing Lewis Capaldi), Billie Eilish, Imagine Dragons
- 2022: Dave, Megan Thee Stallion, Arctic Monkeys, Bring Me the Horizon, the 1975 (replacing Rage Against the Machine), Halsey
- 2021: Liam Gallagher, Biffy Clyro (replacing Queens of the Stone Age), Stormzy, Catfish and the Bottlemen, Post Malone, Disclosure
- 2020 (cancelled): Liam Gallagher, Rage Against the Machine, Stormzy
- 2019: The 1975, Foo Fighters, Post Malone/Twenty One Pilots (Co-headline)
- 2018: Fall Out Boy, Kendrick Lamar/Panic! at the Disco (Co-headline), Kings of Leon
- 2017: Eminem, Muse, Kasabian
- 2016: Foals/Disclosure (Co-headline), Red Hot Chili Peppers, Biffy Clyro/Fall Out Boy (Co-headline)
- 2015: Mumford & Sons, Metallica, the Libertines
- 2014: Queens of the Stone Age/Paramore (Co-headline), Arctic Monkeys, Blink-182
- 2013: Green Day, Eminem, Biffy Clyro
- 2012: The Cure, Kasabian, Foo Fighters
- 2011: My Chemical Romance, the Strokes/Pulp (Co-headline), Muse
- 2010: Guns N' Roses, Arcade Fire, Blink-182
- 2009: Kings of Leon, Arctic Monkeys, Radiohead
- 2008: Rage Against the Machine, the Killers, Metallica
- 2007: Razorlight, Red Hot Chili Peppers, Smashing Pumpkins
- 2006: Franz Ferdinand, Muse, Pearl Jam
- 2005: Pixies, Foo Fighters, Iron Maiden
- 2004: The Darkness, the White Stripes, Green Day
- 2003: Linkin Park, Blur, Metallica
- 2002: The Strokes, Foo Fighters, Guns N' Roses (Leeds), the Prodigy
- 2001: Travis, Manic Street Preachers, Eminem
- 2000: Oasis, Pulp, Stereophonics
- 1999: The Charlatans, Blur, Red Hot Chili Peppers
- 1998: Jimmy Page & Robert Plant, Beastie Boys, Garbage
- 1997: Suede, Manic Street Preachers, Metallica
- 1996: The Prodigy, Black Grape, the Stone Roses
- 1995: Smashing Pumpkins, Björk, Neil Young
- 1994: Cypress Hill, Primal Scream, Red Hot Chili Peppers
- 1993: Porno For Pyros, the The, New Order
- 1992: Nirvana, the Wonder Stuff, Public Enemy
- 1991: Iggy Pop, James, the Sisters of Mercy
- 1990: The Cramps, Inspiral Carpets, Pixies
- 1989: New Order, the Pogues, the Mission
- 1988: Iggy Pop, Starship, Squeeze
- 1987: The Mission, Status Quo, Alice Cooper
- 1986: Killing Joke, Saxon, Hawkwind
- 1985: No festival held
- 1984 (cancelled): Hawkwind, Jethro Tull, Marillion
- 1983: The Stranglers, Black Sabbath, Thin Lizzy
- 1982: Budgie, Iron Maiden, the Michael Schenker Group
- 1981: Girlschool, Gillan, the Kinks
- 1980: Rory Gallagher, UFO, Whitesnake
- 1979: The Police, Scorpions (replacing Thin Lizzy), Peter Gabriel
- 1978: The Jam, Status Quo, Patti Smith
- 1977: Golden Earring, Thin Lizzy, The Sensational Alex Harvey Band
- 1976: Gong, Rory Gallagher, Osibisa
- 1975: Hawkwind, Yes, Wishbone Ash, Supertramp
- 1974: The Sensational Alex Harvey Band, Traffic, Focus
- 1973: Rory Gallagher, Faces, Genesis
- 1972: Curved Air, Faces, Quintessence
- 1971: Arthur Brown, East of Eden, Colosseum
- 1970: Family, Taste, Deep Purple
- 1969: Pink Floyd, the Who, the Nice
- 1968: The Herd, the Nice, Traffic
- 1967: Small Faces, the Nice, Cream
- 1966: Small Faces, the Who, Georgie Fame and the Blue Flames
- 1965: The Yardbirds, Manfred Mann, the Animals
- 1964: The Rolling Stones, Chris Barber Band, Kenny Ball and His Jazzmen
- 1963: Chris Barber's Jazz Band, Acker Bilk's Paramount Jazz Band
- 1962: Chris Barber's Jazz Band, Kenny Ball's Jazzmen
- 1961: Chris Barber's Jazz Band, Ken Colyer's Jazzmen

== Bottling incidents ==
Bottling acts off stage (being forced off stage by a barrage of audience-thrown bottles and cans) is a frequent occurrence at the festival. During the 1970s and 1980s, there were often mass-participation can and bottle fights, and unpopular bands have been bottled offstage throughout the festival's history since the first large-scale "cannings" of 1973 and 1974. Examples include:

- Punk band the Hellions, featuring ex-Damned guitarist Brian James, were booked on an otherwise 100% heavy metal line-up on the Friday of the 1980 Festival and left the stage in less than a minute following an assault of cans, bottles and pork pies. "I Canned the Hellions at Reading" T-shirts were on sale at souvenir stands within the hour.
- In 1983, reggae act Steel Pulse left within moments of arriving on stage under an avalanche of missiles launched by punks and rockers waiting to see the Stranglers.
- John Waite and the No Brakes Band quit the stage on the Saturday of the 1986 festival when their drummer was hit in the head by a 12" vinyl disc.
- In 1988, Bonnie Tyler completed her set despite being pelted with bottles and turf. The same day's headliner Meat Loaf left 20 minutes into his set after being hit by a full two-litre cider bottle. After an initially positive reception Meat Loaf angered the audience by berating them for their treatment of his friend Bonnie Tyler earlier in the day, then stormed off stage when met with a volley of burgers and bottles. He eventually returned shouting "Do you wanna rock 'n' roll or do you wanna throw stuff?" Ten seconds later the cider bottle struck him in the face, at which point he left the stage permanently.
- In 2000, Daphne and Celeste were scheduled on the main stage for a short two song set and were bottled throughout.
- In 2003, Good Charlotte stopped their set 20 minutes short and encouraged the crowd to throw bottles all at the same time after a count of three after being pelted by bottles throughout their set.
- In 2004, 50 Cent was pelted with bottles, mud and an inflatable paddling pool during his set. 50 Cent was on stage for just under 20 minutes before throwing his microphone into the crowd in anger. The Rasmus were also bottled off after one song.
- In 2006 at Reading, Panic! at the Disco lead singer Brendon Urie was struck in the face with a plastic bottle and fell unconscious, forcing the rest of the band to stop mid-song as he lay on the floor. Urie received medical treatment from his road crew for several minutes before regaining consciousness, and the band subsequently continued the song from the point at which it was interrupted. The same year, My Chemical Romance were heckled by a small group of angry audience members. Lead singer Gerard Way encouraged the crowd to throw bottles at them instead, and the band were pelted with golf balls and bottles of urine, among other items.
- In 2008, a crowd of approximately 3,000 people attended the "BBC Introducing" Stage at Reading to see unsigned band the FF'ers, following rumours that it would actually be a secret Foo Fighters gig, and the band were subjected to a large amount of abuse from the audience, including several bottles launched at the band.
- In 2016, Tyler Joseph of Twenty One Pilots was attacked and robbed as he attempted to crowd-surf in the Radio One Tent. Reacting unfavourably to his behaviour, the hostile audience threw him to the ground, ripped off various items of his clothing and stole his ski-mask. Joseph was eventually rescued by security guards, who carried him to an elevated platform where he announced that the band's set was over.

== See also ==
- List of historic rock festivals
- Love Not Riots
- Reading and Leeds Festivals line-ups
- List of music festivals in the United Kingdom
