= Marlay Park =

Suburban public park in the suburb of Rathfarnham in Dublin, Ireland

- Páirc Mharlaí
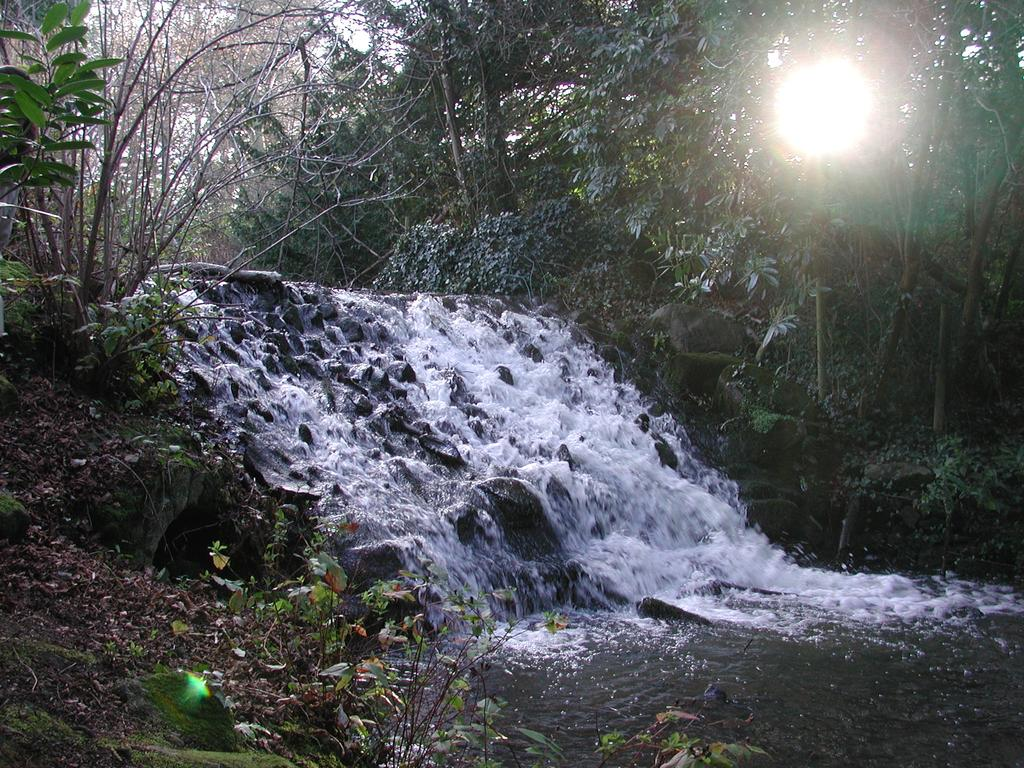
- A waterfall in Marlay Park

- Location within Dublin Location within Ireland
- Type: Suburban public park
- Location: Rathfarnham, Dublin, Ireland
- Coordinates: 53°16′23.827″N 6°16′7.912″W
- Area: 86 hectares (210 acres)
- Operator: Dún Laoghaire–Rathdown County Council

Marlay Park (Irish: Páirc Mharlaí) is a 121 hectares (300 acres) suburban public park located in the suburb of Rathfarnham in Dublin, Ireland. Lying about nine kilometres (5.6 miles) from Dublin city centre, the parkland comprises woodlands, ponds and walks. Recreational spaces include a nine-hole, par-three golf course (reopened in 2010 after redesign and rebuild), tennis courts, six soccer pitches, five GAA pitches, a cricket pitch, a dog park, two children's playgrounds and a miniature railway run by the Dublin Society of Model and Experimental Engineers. There is also a craft courtyard with home craft shops and a coffee shop.

Dublin County Council acquired the land in 1972 and developed it as a regional park. Opened in 1975, it is now administered by Dún Laoghaire–Rathdown County Council. Dublin Bus serves the park directly with the 16 bus, but the following bus is within walking distance: 14 directly to the city centre. The 75 bus goes to Dún Laoghaire. Since 2000 Marlay Park has become a popular music venue with a maximum capacity of 40,000 featuring both renowned national and international performers. The park's name is commonly misspelt as Marley, most notably in nearby housing developments (see below).

== Marlay House and Demesne ==
The park occupies part of the original Marlay demesne which has its origins in the early eighteenth century. Thomas Taylor acquired about 12 hectares of land and built a house called 'The Grange'. David La Touche, a slave owner and first governor of the newly established Bank of Ireland, formerly the La Touche Bank, acquired the property in 1764 and extended the house. He renamed it for his wife Elizabeth Marlay, daughter of George Marlay, Bishop of Dromore. The La Touches developed the property, rebuilding the house and outbuildings and enlarging the extent of the demesne by acquiring adjoining land in 1776, 1777 and 1785. At its greatest extent, the property amounted to 158 hectares. The house, a fine example of Georgian architecture, has many elaborate features including plasterwork by Michael Stapleton.

1837 sketch of Marlay Park Demesne by Anne La Touche

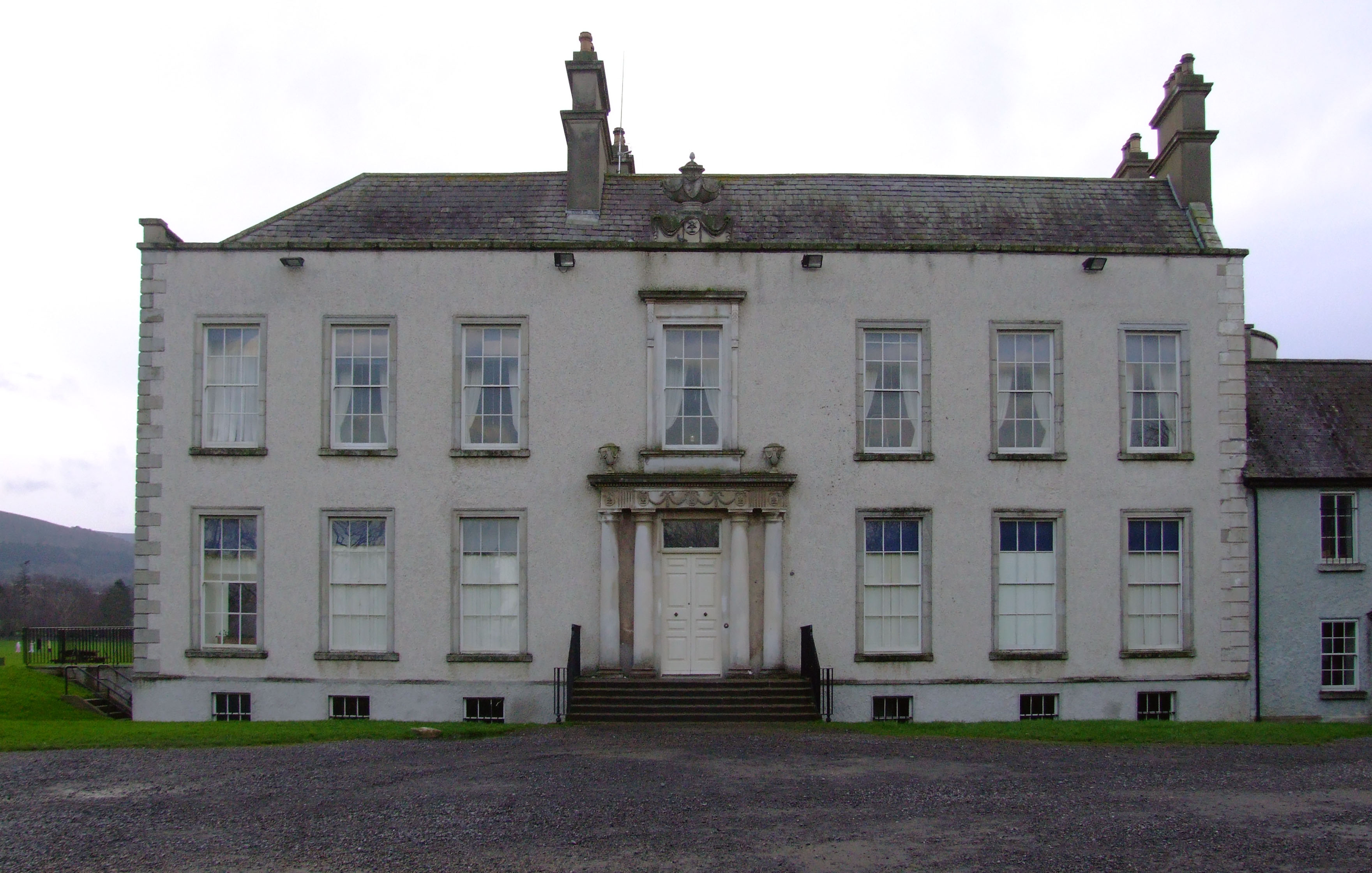
Facade of Marlay House

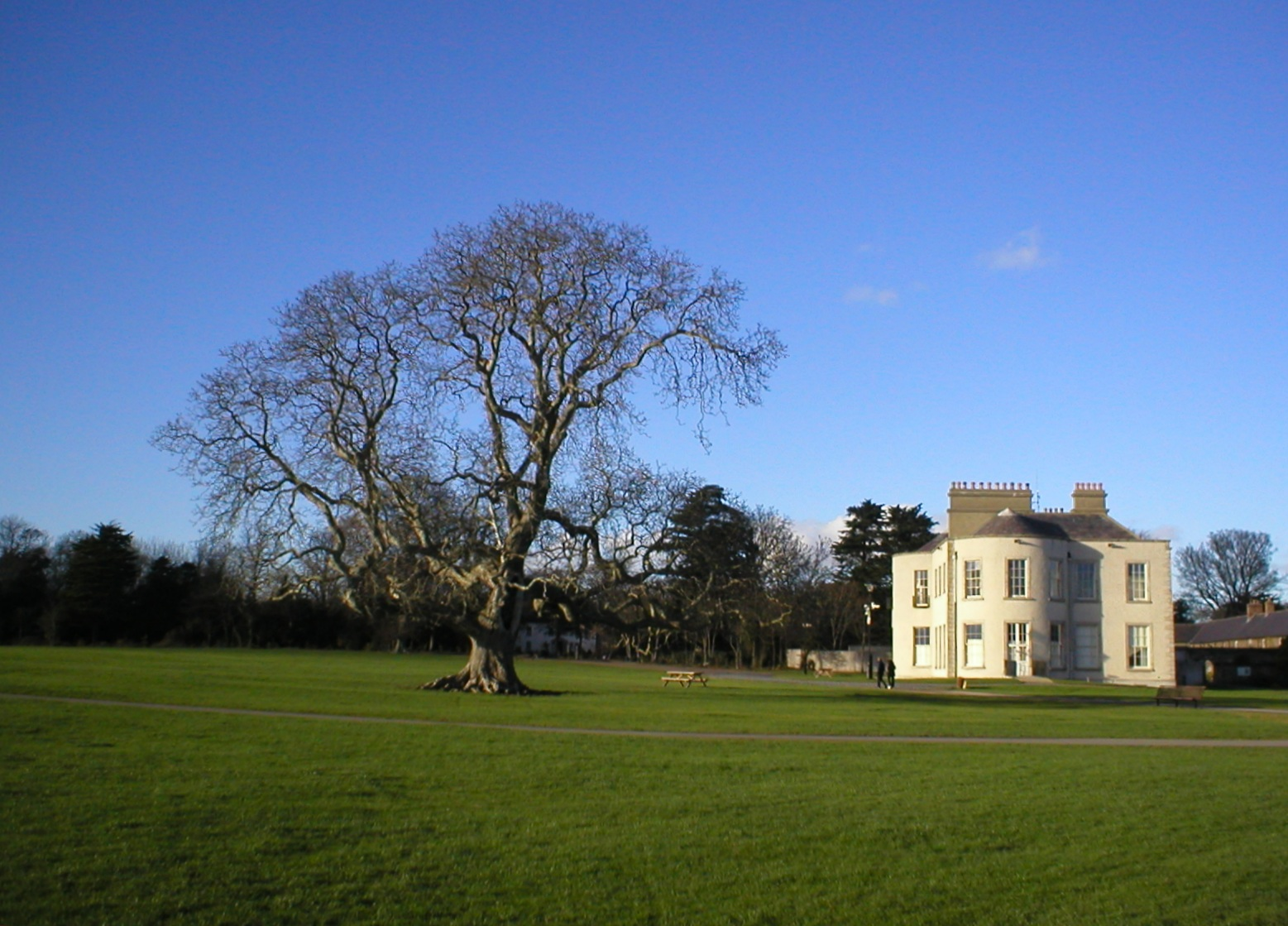
Marlay House in December 2003

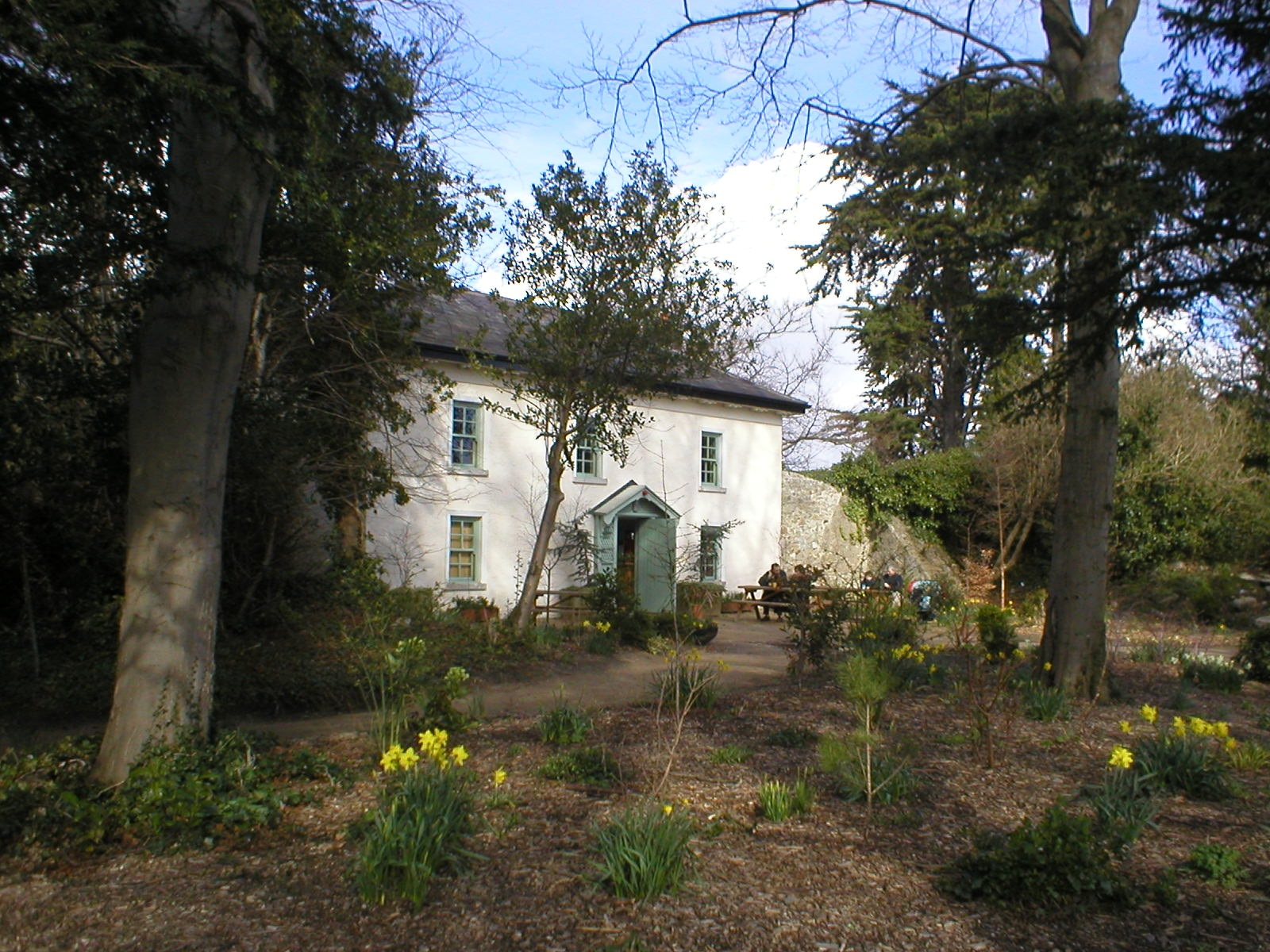
Former Head Gardener's cottage, now a coffee shop and entrance to Regency (Walled) Garden

From 1857 to 1860 Marlay House was the residence of Grace Louisa Butler, Dowager Marchioness of Ormonde, widow of James Butler, 1st Marquess of Ormonde. Marlay House and its demense was sold in 1864 to Robert Tedcastle, a well-known Dublin ship owner and coal merchant. He named one of his ships 'Marlay', which sank off Howth in 1902 with the loss of 15 lives. His family lived there until 1925 when Robert Ketton Love bought the house for £8,325. He lived there until his death in 1939. His son, Philip Love, a market gardener who was once one of Ireland's largest tomato producers, was also a racehorse breeder whose famous horse Larkspur won the 1962 Epsom Derby. He died in August 1970 and in 1972 it was bought by Dublin County Council for £500,000. The park was officially opened by Taoiseach, Liam Cosgrave on 29 June 1975. A 1.82 hectares (4.5 acres) walled garden was built near the house around 1794, and consists of restored regency ornamental and kitchen gardens. The ornamental garden boasts an extensive display of period plants, ranging from herbaceous borders to shrub beds. The Head Gardener's house, orangery, arbour and water features combine to create a distinctive atmosphere. Located just over the wall, the kitchen garden houses a fine collection of regency fruit trees, vegetables and associated bothies.

Daily tours of the gardens take place during the summer months and by appointment at other times. The former gardener's house offers refreshments year round.

== Marlay Craft Centre ==
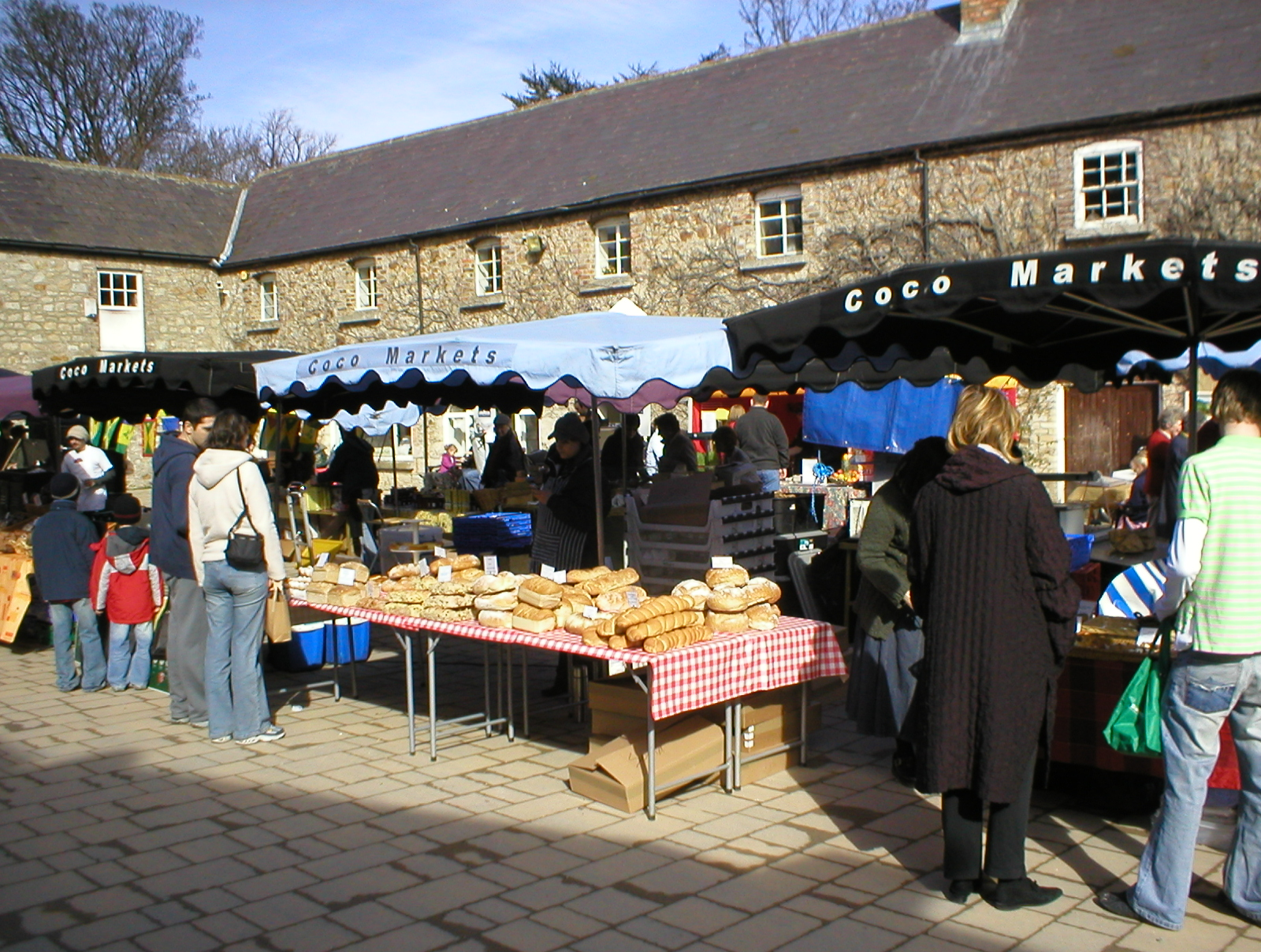
Farmer's Market, held each Saturday and Sunday in the Craft Courtyard

A number of small craft workshops are located in the 18th century stable yard adjacent to Marlay House including, weaving, glass cutting, bookbinding, furniture restoration, copper craft, pottery, jewellery and embroidery. One of these was originally the residence of Evie Hone whose stained-glass workshop was located in the library of Marlay House itself.

== Wicklow Way ==
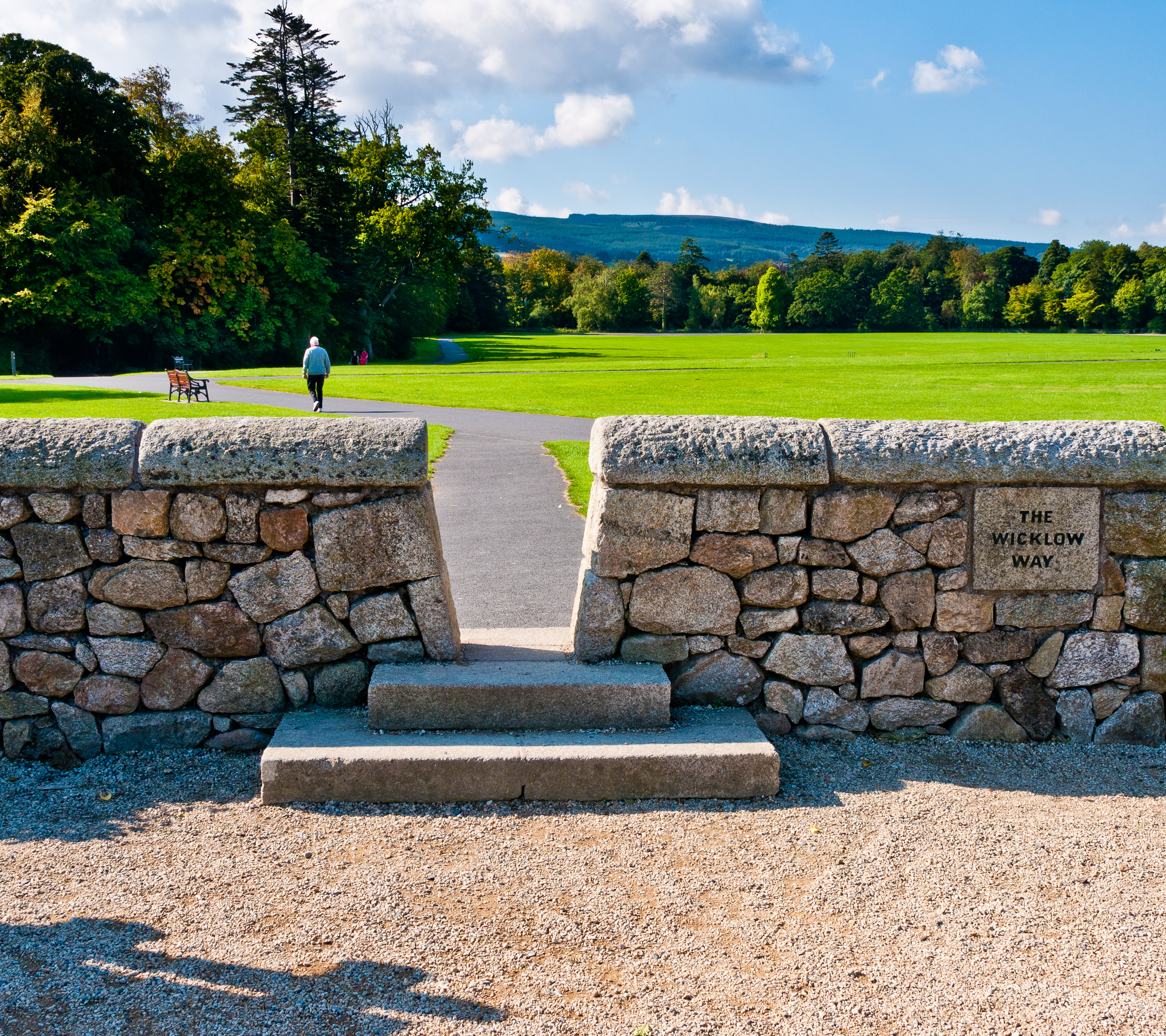
Wicklow Way trailhead

Marlay Park is the official starting point of the 132 km Wicklow Way a long-distance walking trail, that begins at the car park adjacent to Marlay House. The trail wanders through the park before tunnelling under the M50 motorway to begin its first ascent southwards towards the Dublin hills and the Wicklow Mountains to Clonegal, County Carlow.

== Marley Grange ==
Several housing developments adjacent to Marlay Park contain roads named "Marley": Avenue, Drive, Walk, Close, Grove and Wood. Early ordnance survey maps also use the same spelling, as does at least one local road sign.

== Longitude Festival ==
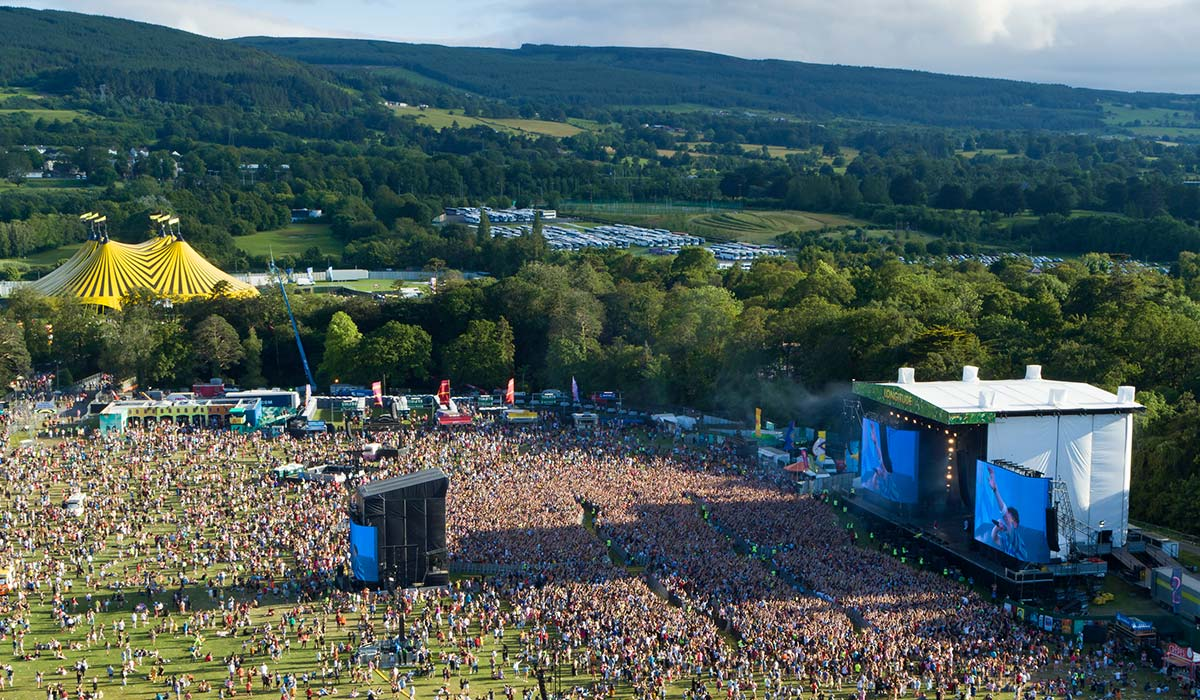
Longitude Festival 2019 at Marlay Park

Since 2013, Marlay Park has been home to Longitude Festival, which takes place during July each year. When the festival first started in its early years the line up was mostly bands and singer songwriters such as Phoenix, Kodaline, and Sam Smith. As the festival evolved in later years it mostly consisted of hip hop artists such as Stormzy, Travis Scott, and Ski Mask the Slump God. In 2022, after a three-year hiatus due to the COVID-19 pandemic, the festival returned with acts such as ASAP Rocky, Megan Thee Stallion, Tyler, the Creator and Jack Harlow

== Concerts ==
During the Summer months the park holds many concerts and events, some of the more popular artists have been: Guns N' Roses, Red Hot Chili Peppers, Foo Fighters, Green Day, Radiohead, Muse, The Killers, Westlife, Van Morrison, Sting, David Gray, Meat Loaf, UB40, The Waterboys, R.E.M., Oasis, Coldplay, The Chemical Brothers, Basement Jaxx, Underworld, Metallica, Nine Inch Nails, Macklemore and many others.

- The Coronas, Villagers, Joanna Newsom, Roger Daltrey, 2 Many DJ's, Rodrigo Y Gabriela and Bell X1 all performed under canvas in 2011.
- Kasabian, Noel Gallagher's High Flying Birds, Van Morrison, Tom Jones, and David Guetta all performed in outdoor shows in 2012.
- Arcade Fire with The Pixies, Kanye West with Pharrell Williams, Macklemore, Kings of Leon and Arctic Monkeys all performed in 2014.
- Avicii, Paolo Nutini, Imelda May, Alabama Shakes and Gaz Coombes all performed here in July 2015.
- Kodaline played here on 8 July 2016.
- The Stone Roses played here on 9 July 2016.
- Queen + Adam Lambert with support from The Boomtown Rats and The Darkness (band) played here on the 8th July 2018.
- Bruno Mars played here on 12 July 2018.
- The Weeknd played here on 28 June 2023.
- Def Leppard and Mötley Crüe played here on the 4th July 2023. It was Mötley Crüe's first ever concert in Dublin.
- Pearl Jam played at Marlay Park on 22 June 2024, on their The Dark Matter Tour.
- Olivia Rodrigo played here on 24 June 2025, on their Guts World Tour.
- Chris Brown will perform on 28 June 2025 for his Breezy Bowl XX tour.
