= Straffan Parish Church =

- Teampall Pharóiste, Teach Srafáin
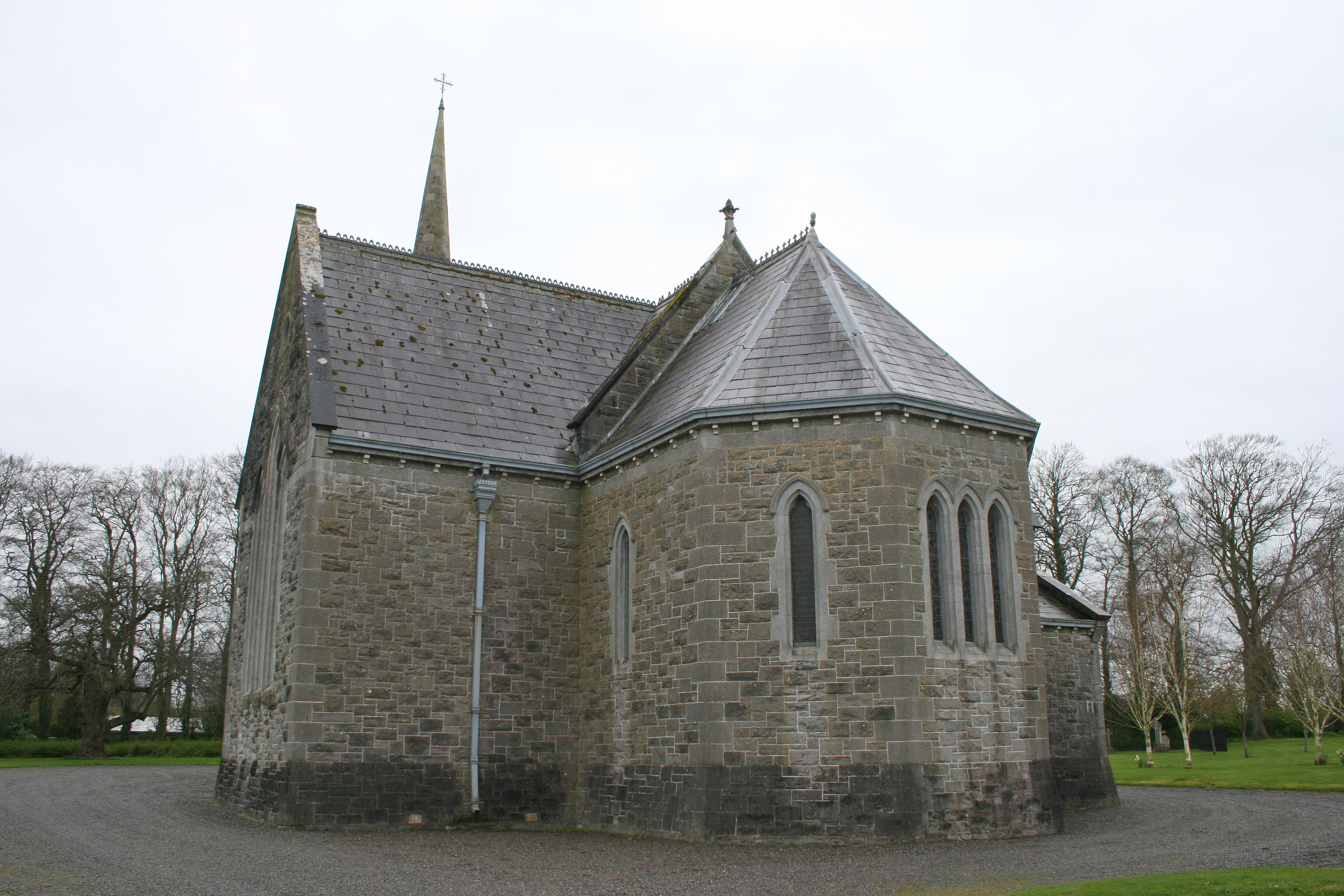

- Location within Ireland
- 53.310959°N 6.609585°W
- Location: Straffan, County Kildare
- Country: Ireland
- Denomination: Church of Ireland

History
- Consecrated: 18 June 1838

Architecture
- Functional status: active
- Style: Gothic Revival
- Years built: 8
- Groundbreaking: 1830

Specifications
- Length: 30 m (98 ft)
- Width: 11 m (36 ft)
- Materials: limestone, slate, cast iron, lead

Administration
- Province: Dublin and Cashel
- Diocese: Dublin and Glendalough
- Parish: Celbridge & Straffan with Newcastle Lyons

Straffan Parish Church is a Gothic Revival Church of Ireland church in Straffan, Ireland, completed in 1838.

== Location ==
Straffan Parish Church is located in the south of Straffan village, 700 m (½ mile) north of the River Liffey.

== History ==
The successor to St. Patrick's Church, Straffan, this church was established by Hugh and Anna Barton in 1830 and consecrated in 1838.

The original church consisted of a porch with vestry and utility room surmounted by a spire. The porch opened into the nave with a simple sanctuary at the east end. The north and south transepts, followed by a raised sanctuary were added later giving the church its present cruciform shape.

The oldest windows are in the transepts and were made in the 1870s by Heaton, Butler and Bayne.

At the top of the nave is a fine carved font dated Christmas 1875.

The organ was built by Peter Conagher & Co of Huddersfield and Dublin and installed in 1897.

The church remained a private chapel until 1933, when it was transferred to the Church of Ireland Representative Church Body (RCB).

== Building ==
A four-bay church on a cruciform plan. In the nave, there is a variety of later windows depicting Christ's life and dedicated to the memory of Bertram Francis Barton, a former owner of Straffan House.

The three windows on the south nave (Christ blessing the children; the Crucifixion; and the Resurrection) are by Alfred Ernest Child.

The three windows in the north nave are by H.W. Bryans of London.
