= Liamuin =

Medieval Irish poem

Liamuin is a poem in Dindsenchas Érann which explains the medieval Irish place-lore relating to nine assemblies and noted places in Ireland. The premise is largely dedicated to the etymological legend for Lyons, a hill and former royal inauguration site. Lyons, on the border between the modern counties of County Kildare and County Dublin was later the focus of a parish; it is situated near the banks of the River Liffey, 20 km upstream from Dublin.

== Background ==
The section of Dindsenchas Érann containing this poem is found in the 12th-century Book of Leinster and was probably composed by Cináed Ua Hartacáin (d. 975). The legends mixed real and fictional events and people to create place legends for the names of about 300 locations in Ireland. Place names are explained by reference to legends which are linked to them by means of pseudo-etymological techniques, where sometimes fictitious stories are adduced to explain the existing names, with the result that some of these legends are only to be found in the Dindshenchas, where they serve their explanatory purpose. The Dindsenchas reflect a mentality in which the land of Ireland is perceived as being completely translated into story: each place has a history which is continuously retold. The expressed mentality of Dindsenchas is to be found throughout all phases of Irish literature. It was part of the body of knowledge medieval Irish poets were expected to master, and the importance attached to the material is reflected in its presence in many of the major manuscripts.

They are not to be taken literally. For example, Dublin, a name derived from the Irish name Dubh Linn, literally the "black pool" where the Dodder meets the Liffey, is re-imagined through the guise of an elaborate legend about a princess who died at the spot where Dublin was built. Instead it reflects the literary, religious and political hierarchies of the time. During a period of the North Kildare dynasty, the Uí Dúnchada branch of the Uí Dúnlainge kindred were at their most powerful, and supplied ten kings of Leinster from their base on nearby Lyons Hill between 750 and 1050. In choosing Cnoch Liamhna for mention as one of the "assemblies and noted places in Ireland," the poem is an indication of the strength of the local ruling family, It also includes a separate place legend for nearby Straffan. Unlike Liamuin, Lumman Tige Srafáin is a work of prose and not part of the metrical Dindsenchas.

The explanation for Lyons is that Liamhain is Irish for elm tree.

== Text ==
The notable places of Leinster wealth of valour
do the historians declare them?
the notable places, and next the raths,
many the causes whence they are named.

Myself will declare the cause whence are named
nine of their notable places;
till doomsday it shall be a fame unfading,
So that no one be left in doubt!

Liamuin, Forcarthain of the sods,
Miannach, Trustiu of the broad roads;
are notable places known by various designations
with their four fair names.

Miannach, Fercarthain of the feasts
Liamuin, and white-sided Trustiu
were maidens, a precious possession,
of the family of the good king of Dubthair.

It was Dubthach of Dubthair fierce of face,
king of the Desi of Bregia of the undying bards,
(his was all as far as the horse-rearing region of the estuaries,)
whose four fair daughters they were.

The month over the bargain that all observe,
at the present time it is no novelty,
Dubthach was the first to add it,
the rule is well known to the Ui Chuinn.

A year's wage (it was a judgment of the wise)
from every king to every warrior,
only Dubthach would not give it
without additional work, that was excessive.

Dubthach was son of Fergna noble and fair
son of Muredach son of Sinell
son of Bregon the famous for victory,
son of Oengus, son of Eogan.

Eogan Brec is still spoken of,
the son of well-born Fiachu Suidige,
35] son of noble Fedlimid Rechtmar,
son of Tuathal Techtmar great and strong.

That is the pedigree till now
of Dubthach good king of the Desi,
for my art-prompted tale to set forth
among all the noted places of Leinster.

The gentle sons of Acher Cerr from the harbour,
sprung of the Erainn of Munster of the cavaliers
met their death, it was no mild decease,
it blasted their growth all at once.

An injunction of stern force was laid
on the fair and lofty four;
it was no pleasant tryst in the dark,
it was an injunction in virtue of their love,

That they should not wed, in the land of the living,
the four beloved sisters,
or that they should meet their death;
the keeping of the injunction was no easy task for them.

Fomu and renowned Roimper,
Fernocht, Ferdub the sagacious;
the mention of their names together
has gained from us, as was due, a noble stanza.

These youths from the Erainn of our line
were darlings of free peoples,
the sons of Acher Cerr of the province
son of Eochu Find the handless,

Son of Mug Lama the stainless
son of fierce Lugaid of the encampments
(and of Olldoitech, choice of fair women)
son of shapely Cairpre Cromchend.

They came, hard the toil
to earn their guerdon,
the four thanes, winning a name for valour,
at the house of Dubthach of Dubthair.

The four dear daughters of Dubthach
four youths they had, for certain;
as is the prosperous custom till now,
each loved his mate.

Dubthach had gone to a fortunate battle
in the mighty province of Leinster,
with the four they loved therein
the youths remained behind him.

After waiting behind the king,
they made off untroubled,
despite the hardships of every path,
80] the company who had feigned sickness.

Dubthach slew the comely company,
after they had met, side to side:
the barrows of their dear sod-built raths remain,
for youth and maid alike.

Miannach is followed across every plain
to Miannach where she was killed;
the woman with martial array is killed,
so that her name clave to the hill.

Fercarthain of the feasts is killed;
in Forcarthain was she smitten,
slow-eyed, long-haired, short-lived,
she met destruction at Forcarthain.

Liamuin is slain, perfect of temper,
thick-haired, skilful in defence;
she met death through her peculiar prowess,
wherefore Liamuin is full famous.

Trustiu is slain in Trustiu southward;
the gentle woman suffered for her alliance;
the hill of Cairn in Bile is called
by that maiden's name.

Fomu is slain at Fomain,
he thick-haired warrior with fair locks;
many a lean host comes frequently
over the two fair cheeks of Fomain.

Roimper was pursued
across the waters to Glass Rompair;
so hot Roimper fell,
it is not a sin to tell of it.

Fernocht in Fornocht of the feasts,
cruelly was his flesh mangled;
the youth met ill treatment
among the spears in Fornocht.

Ferdub, fierce of face, of doughty deeds,
at the Black Fords of red Maistiu,
at the hill, outwearied by bloody forays,
his face was found after keen combat.

The famous Luachair of Boirend
was the sad mother of the four;
the fair woman came to her death
among the plains of the strong places.

Fomu, husband of Liamuin, rests with her;
the spouses were of like age,
the white-handed soldier-pair,
alike are the lovers twain.

Fercarthain, lovely was her face,
(her love, I reckon him without delay,)
through their converse is assured
her great love to Roimper.

Fernocht belongs to unwrinkled Miannach:
he helped her not by his cruel cunning;
the warrior of the proved troops destroyed her,
his cunning was no helpful cunning.

Ferdub belongs to white-sided Trustiu,
their equal date was lamented;
in naming them here not misleading are
my pleasant harmonious verses.

These places that I number presently
the learned of Erin shall praise;
at their ease shall sages name them
from their assemblies and their noted places.
