= Straffan railway station =

Former rail facility in County Kildare, Ireland

Coordinates: 53°17′46″N 6°35′05″W

Straffan Cluainíní

General information
- Location: Clownings, near Straffan, County Kildare; Ireland
- Elevation: 212 ft (65 m)
- Platforms: 2
- Tracks: 2

History
- Original company: Great Southern and Western Railway

Key dates
- 1 August 1848: Station opens
- 5 October 1853: Straffan rail accident
- 9 June 1947: Station closes to goods
- 10 November 1947: Station closes to passengers
- 1976: Signal cabin closes
Location
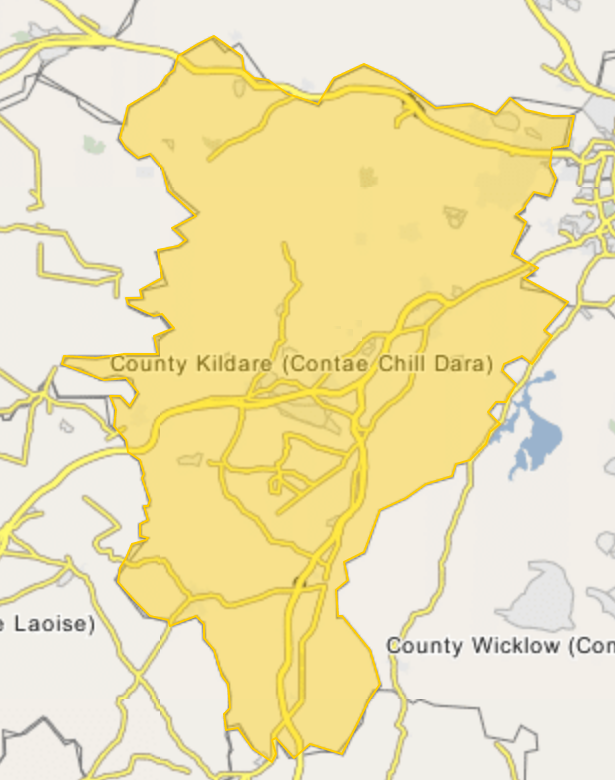
- Location within County Kildare Location within Ireland

Straffan was a station located 2 1/2 miles (3.5 km) from Straffan in County Kildare, Ireland. It also served the village of Ardclough.

== History ==
Straffan Station was on the Great Southern & Western Railway's main Dublin to Cork line, and had opened two years after the line itself in August 1848. Five years later, the third worst rail accident in Irish history occurred a quarter of a mile south of Straffan, when a goods train ran into the back of a stationary passenger train, causing eighteen deaths.

A post office was built near the station in May 1872.

The station, which had up and down platforms, with a small station building on the up side, was closed by CIÉ in November 1947, but it remained a signalling block post. The signal cabin at Straffan was closed however in 1976, after which the redundant station buildings became derelict and were demolished in the mid 1980s.

Preceding station	Historical railways	Following station
Hazelhatch	Great Southern and Western Railway; Dublin–Cork	Sallins
