= Turnings, County Kildare =

Turnings
- Townland
- Location in Ireland
- Coordinates: 53°17′20″N 6°37′59″W
- Country: Ireland
- Province: Leinster
- County: County Kildare
- Time zone: UTC+0 (WET)
  - Summer (DST): UTC-1 (IST (WEST))

Turnings (Irish: Toirnín) is a townland in County Kildare, Ireland. It is situated on the banks of the Morell River, a tributary of the River Liffey. It is a rural area between Clane and Straffan.

The townlands of Turnings (Irish: Toirnín), Turnings Upper (Toirnín Uachtarach) and Turnings Lower (Toirnín Íochtarach) are in the civil parish of Whitechurch. Turnings townland, which has an area of approximately 0.21 square kilometres (0.08 sq mi), had a population of 18 people as of the 2011 census.

== Etymology ==
The origin of the place name is unclear. The Placenames Database of Ireland lists a number of variants, including "villa de Surnyng" (1407), "Turnings" (1582), "Torning" (1603) and "Surnings" (1603).

Some local fields, around Turnings House, bear Irish names. These include a "rocky field facing the hall-door" which is known as "Clocheraun" and others known as "Parkanaughy" and "Gortshannick". Where the Turnings Road joins the Sallins Road is a stretch called "Crookaun" and a gate previously known locally as "Gallows Gate".

== History ==
In the County Kildare (Clane) Inquisition, No. 5 of Charles II, the townland goes by the name of "Surning", as well as "Turning and Twinings". In 1406, the custody of the lands in the town of "Surnyng" was granted by the king to Thomas Hall, who on 18 June 1422, was appointed Sheriff of the County Kildare.

An entry in the Journal of the County Kildare Archaeological Society states that, in the 16th century, the area:

"formed a part of the Manor of Whitechurch, which belonged to the Viscounts Gormanston. As early as 1508 Sir William Preston, 2nd Viscount Gormanston, enfeoffed Archdeacon Robert Sutton and Thomas Cornwalshe, Vicar of Stamullen, in the Manor of Whitechurch, alias Tullaghtipper, containing the towns and lands of le Turnyng, alias Surnyng, Clonyng, Killenmore, Kilbregaghe, Killussy, Rathmore, near Clane, Collenblakeston, Ardress, Cloghle, Osbertiston, and Clanwhiche, which were held of the King."

"Sir William died on the 22nd September, 1582, and was succeeded by his eldest son, Jenico Preston, 3rd Viscount, who leased the Manor of Whitechurch, on the 16th February, 1560, to Patrick Sarsfield, merchant, of Dublin, and brother of Sir William Sarsfield, Knt., of Lucan, Dublin, to whom it passed, and in whose family it remained till it was forfeited by his grandson, William (son of John) Sarsfield, of Lucan, who joined in the Rebellion of 1641."

The Journal of the County Kildare Archaeological Society also states that:

"There was one parcel of 3 acres (12,000 m^{2}) in Turnings on Sir William's death in 1616, called 'Gortinuck,' or 'Monemuck' (i.e., the Garden of the Pig, or Bog of the Pig), which was claimed by Martin Long, of Derry (Daars), as belonging to him."

"After being forfeited by the last-named William Sarsfield, Turnings was granted to Sir Theophilus Jones, Knt., of Osbertstown, in the County Meath. He was the second son of Doctor Lewis Jones, Bishop of Killaloe; he died on the 2nd January, 1684, and was buried in Naas. By his wife, Alicia, daughter of Arthur, son of Sir William Usher, Knt., he left an eldest son, Sir Arthur Jones, Knt., who succeeded him in Osbertstown."

"About the year 1582 is recorded a pardon for rebellion of Edmond Keogh (the swarthy) O'Lalor, of Turnings, gentleman; Margaret, his wife; Richard, his son; Elis, his daughter; and Murrough O'Duffy, his servant."

The Mills family took possession of Turnings House in the 19th century.

== Built heritage ==
Turnings House, an 18th-century house, is located in the townland of Turings Upper. A sculptured window-head of two lights can be found at the back of the house. Writing in the Journal of the County Kildare Archaeological Society in 1902, Walter Fitzgerald stated that "it is not known whether this window is in situ, or whether it was brought here from another locality, is not known, its probable date is the fifteenth or sixteenth century".

Millbrook House, a 19th-century Georgian house, is in Turnings Lower near Straffan.

== Abattoir ==
In 1959, Turnings became the location for Ireland's first horse abattoir. As of 2024, "Shannonside Foods Ltd, Turnings, Straffan, Co Kildare" was the only licensed or certified slaughterhouse, in Ireland, that was then "killing equines".
