= Train event recorder =

Train electronic recording device

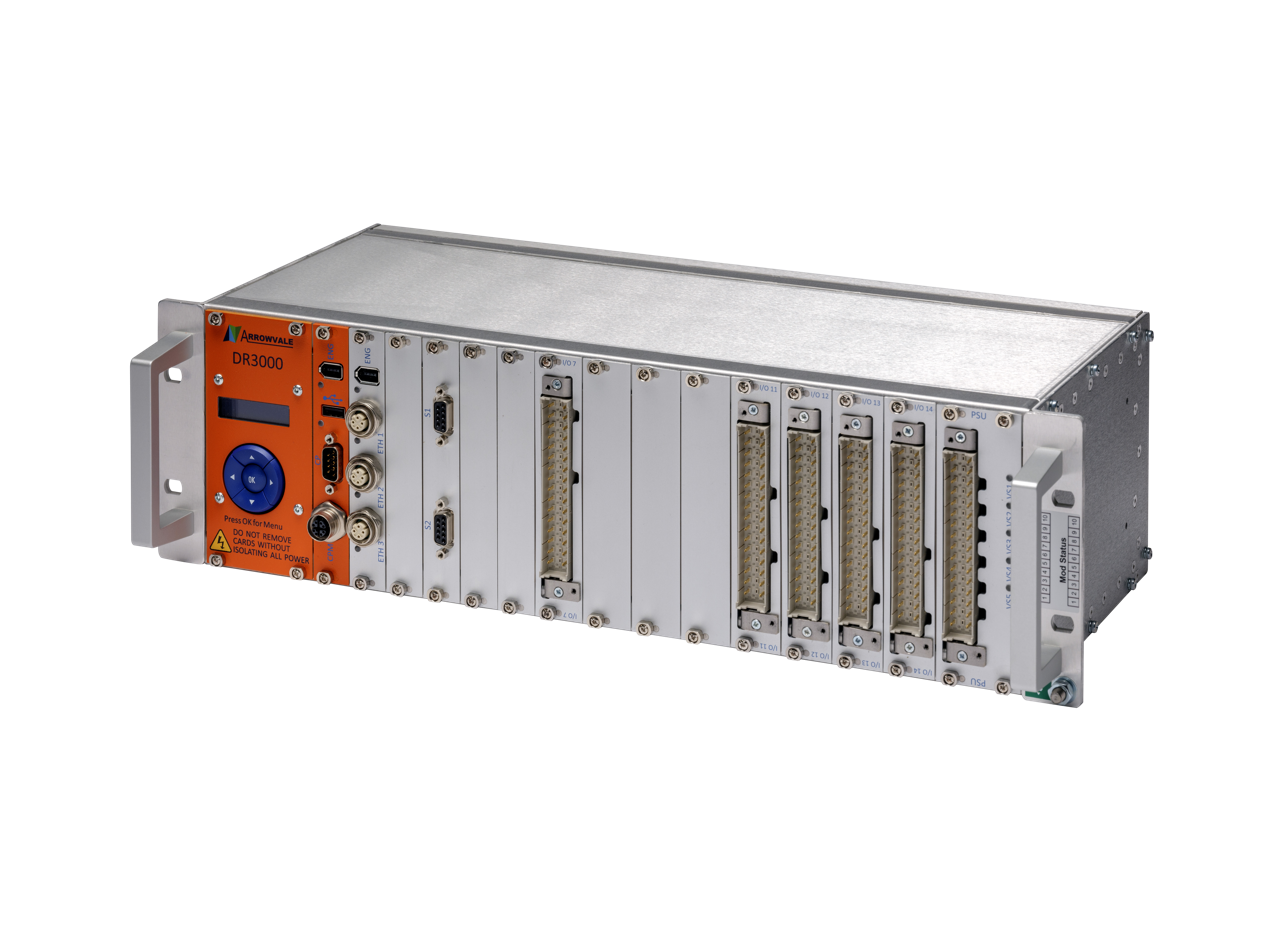
- Example of a UK 480-millimetre (19 in) modular OTMR (On-Train Monitoring Recorder) / OTDR (On Train Data Recorder
- Type: Train Event Recorder
- Inventor: Hasler Rail of Switzerland
- Inception: 1891

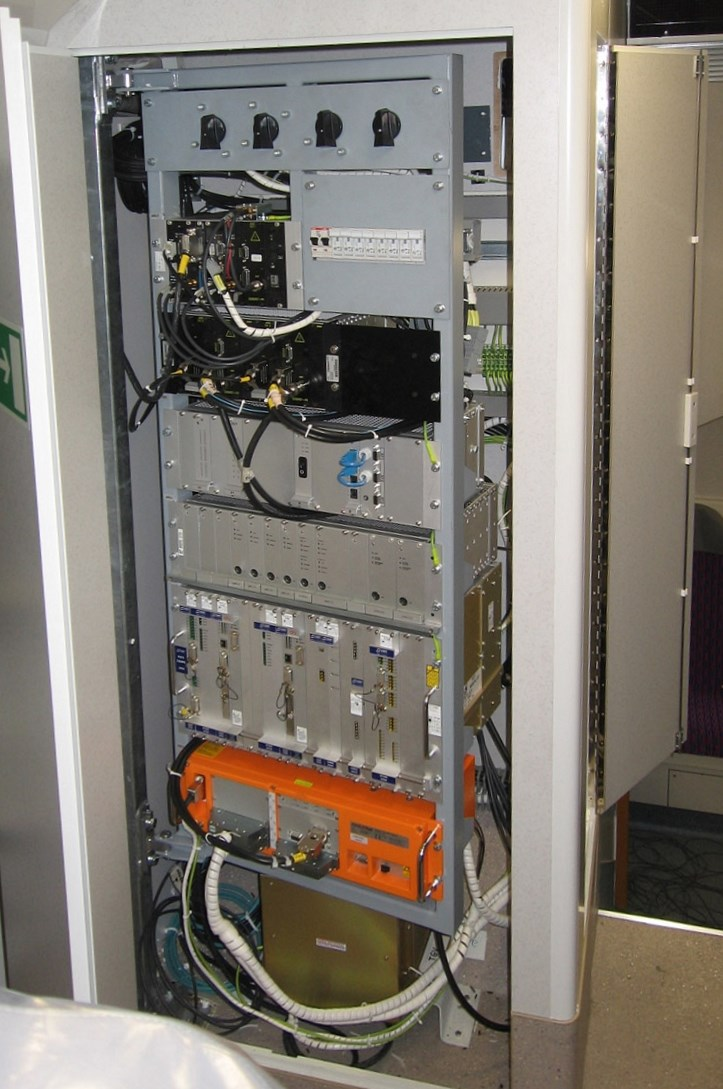
Juridical Recording (orange) Blackbox as part of an ETCS equipment

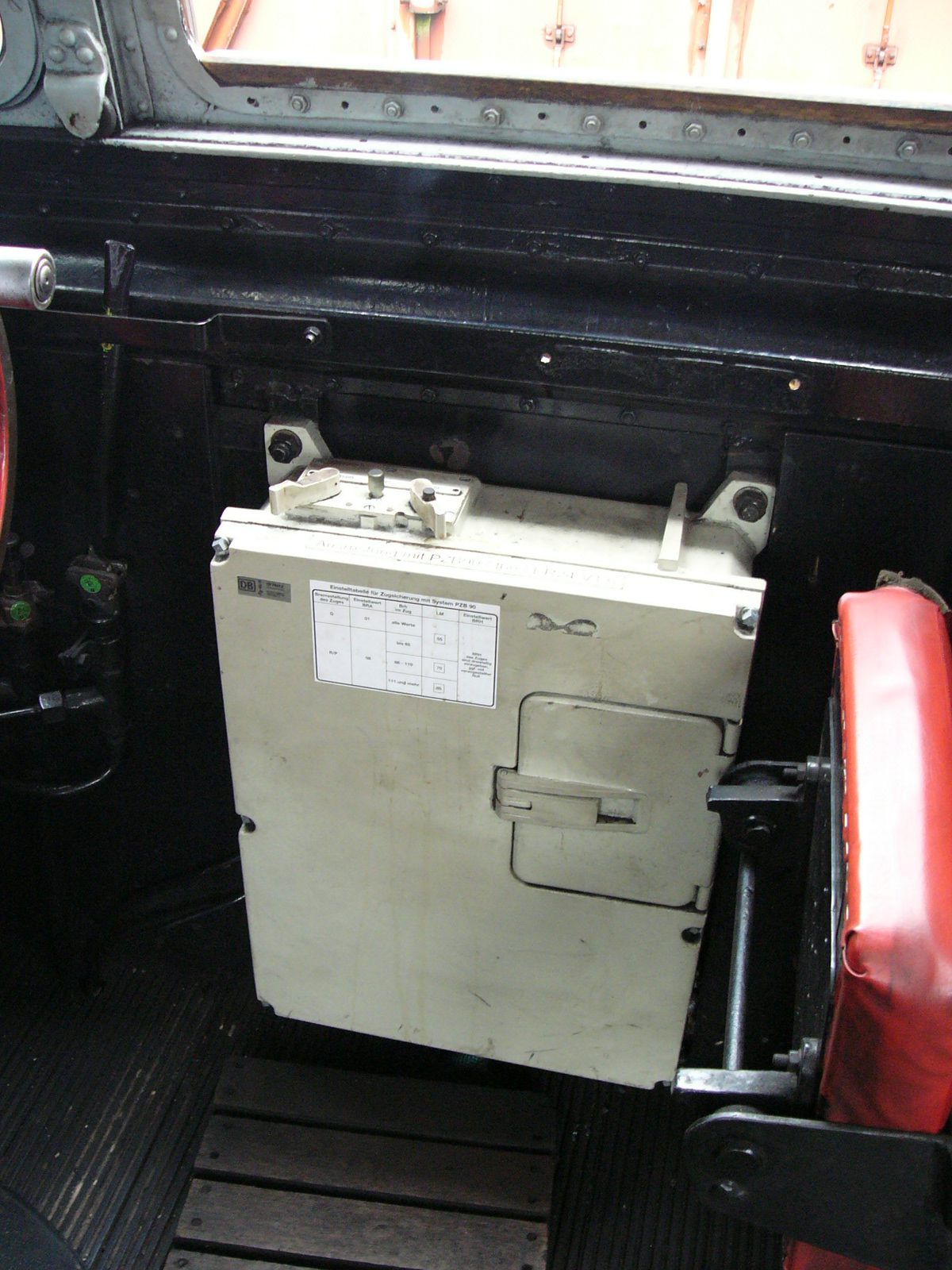
Indusi I60 ER24 control device with the DSK recorder inside

A train event recorder – also called On-Train Monitoring Recorder (OTMR), On-Train Data Recorder (OTDR), Event Recorder System (ERS), Event Recorder Unit (ERU), or Juridical Recording Unit (JRU) – is a device that records data about the operation of train controls, the performance of the train in response to those controls, and the operation of associated control systems. It is similar in purpose to the flight data recorder or black box used on aircraft.

== Functions ==
Because event recorders are integrated with most car-borne systems, they are an attractive target for enhanced diagnostic and control functions. Some event recorders feature outputs controlling penalty braking or emergency braking systems, as well as speedometers.

Data storage can be provided by magnetic tape, battery-backed RAM and, more recently, non-volatile EEPROM or flash memory, overwritten in a FIFO continuous loop. The data is intended for use in the investigation of accidents and other incidents, but is also used to monitor the performance of traction units, the competence of drivers, and the general state of a train over a period of time.

== Development ==
A suggestion in The Times of 10 October 1853, commenting on a train collision near Portarlington station, on the Great Southern and Western Railway, on 5 October that year, called for a paper-roll recorder, keeping a log of wheel revolutions against time, to be carried in a locked box on trains, the record to be removed and stored by station masters at the destination station. In 1864, a similar proposal came from Charles Babbage, inspired by his 1840 experiments for the Great Western Railway using self-inking pens on paper rolls, which were part of the equipment carried on dynamometer cars. No action seems to have been taken in either case. The earliest event recorders were the mechanical "TEL" speed recorders of 1891, which recorded both time and speed. The TEL's manufacturer, Hasler Rail of Switzerland, remains a leading producer of train event recorders.

France developed the Flaman Speed Indicator and Recorder. In Germany, the Indusi train protection system included recording equipment using a ticker tape on paper. For I60R a generalized recorder system was installed (Datenspeicherkassette [DSK] / data storage cassette of Deuta-Werke) that allowed for the entry of the train number, driver information and train weight, along with the driving events. The standardized DSK black box allows for approximately 30,000 km of general recording data and 90 km of detailed recording data. Later models of the DSK are electronic especially since the introduction of the computerized PZ80/PZB90 train protection generations.

Modern train event recorders follow international or national standards, such as IEEE Std. 1482.1-1999, FRA 49 CFR Part 229, and IEC 62625-1, specified the digital and analogue data to be acquired, recorded and transmitted for further analysis. The need for event recorders to survive any accident led companies such as Grinsty Rail (UK), Faiveley (France), Hasler Rail (Switzerland), Deuta-Werke (Germany), Bach-Simpson (Canada), Saira Electronics (Italy) (previously FAR Systems), and MIOS Elettronica (Italy) to develop crash-protected memory modules as a part of their event recorders. Those new-generation event recorders are in growing demand both for rapid transit systems and mainline trains.

== Regulations ==
=== Canada ===
Canadian regulations provide in the "Locomotives Design Requirements (Part II)"

"12. Event Recorders. 12.1 Controlling locomotives other than in designated and/or yard service, shall be equipped with an event recorder meeting the following minimum design criteria: The event recorder shall record time, distance, speed, brake pipe pressure, throttle position, emergency brake application, independent brake cylinder pressure, horn signal and Reset Safety Control function"

=== United States ===
U.S. regulations define event recorders as follows: (CFR 49 Ch II 229.5):

"(g) Event recorder means a device, designed to resist tampering, that monitors and records data on train speed, direction of motion, time, distance, throttle position, brake applications and operations (including train brake, independent brake, and, if so equipped, dynamic brake applications and operations) and, where the locomotive is so equipped, cab signal aspect(s), over the most recent 48 hours of operation of the electrical system of the locomotive on which it is installed. A device, designed to resist tampering, that monitors and records the specified data."

The Federal Railroad Administrations (FRA) "Final Rule 49 CFR Part 229", (revised June 30, 2005) requires that event recorders be fitted to the leading locomotives of all US, Canadian and Mexican trains operating above 30 miles per hour (48 km/h) on the US rail network including all freight, passenger and commuter rail locomotives but does not apply to transit running on its own dedicated tracks.

The new ruling applies to locomotives either ordered before Oct 1, 2006 or placed in service after Oct 1, 2009 and included:

- Improved crash worthiness by means of a "hardened" memory module able to withstand:
  - Fire resistance of 750 °C for 1 hour, this test simulates the temperature of burning diesel fuel
  - Impact shock of 55 g 100ms
  - Static crush of 110 kN for 5 minutes, this test simulates a locomotive derailment and blunt object impact
  - Fluid immersion in Diesel, water, salt water or lube oils for 2 days
  - Hydrostatic pressure equivalent to immersion to a depth of 15 m in water for 2 days
- Recording of additional information to enhance the quality of information available for post-accident investigations including the following "safety-critical" signals:
  - Speed
  - Direction of travel (Forward or Reverse)
  - Time
  - Distance
  - Throttle position
  - Operation of brakes
  - Status of Headlights and Marker Lights (On or Off)
  - Operation of Horn
  - Status of Cab signals
- Store the last 48 hours of safety-critical train data. This is to prevent over-writing of the crash data if the loco is used for the subsequent "clean-up" of the crash scene.
- The phasing out of the old magnetic tape models over a four-year period due to their vulnerability to data loss in the event of a crash.

=== United Kingdom and Ireland ===
All trains operating on Network Rail controlled infrastructure are required to be fitted with an event recorder complying with RIS-2472-RST-Iss-1, the standard also cross references with BS EN 62625-1:2013. Ireland has also adopted this regulation. RSSB (Rail Safety and Standards Board) is responsible for event recorder standards in the UK.

Crash protection requirements:

- Fire resistance of 700 °C for 5 minutes
- Impact shock of 100 g, three times on each of its six sides
- Static crush of 20 kN for 1 minute, to all edges and faces
- Fluid immersion in water, AFFF or R134A for 1 hour
- Magnetic field produced by a current pulse of 0 to 64 kA, rising at 10^{7} A/s, at a distance of 1 metre

The UK approach is similar to US requirements, but the list of required signals is more comprehensive. This reflects, in part, the prevalence of passenger trains and thus the possibility of incidents involving access doors.

Signals to be recorded include:

- Brake demand including operation of all Brake Controls and other brake activations
- Power notch
- Wheel speed
- Speedometer, both signal sent to speedometer and indication displayed to driver
- Automatic Warning System (AWS) operation
- Driver reminder appliance (DRA) operation
- Vigilance Operation
- Passenger Emergency Systems (PES)
- Override of any Safety System
- Horn
- Door signals
- Door inter-lock
- Wheel slide protection (WSP)
- Tilt, if fitted
- Speed supervision & Control, if fitted

=== Switzerland ===
Speed recording equipment has been used by Swiss Federal Railways for many years.

== See also ==
- Black box (disambiguation)
- Tachograph - largely defunct, used on locomotives and automobiles
- Flight recorder, Flight data recorder and Cockpit voice recorder - used on aircraft
- Event Data Recorder - used on automobiles
- Voyage Data Recorder - used on ships
- Data logger
