= Barberstown Castle =

Fortified structure in County Kildare, Ireland

- Caisleán Bhaile an Bharbaigh (Irish)
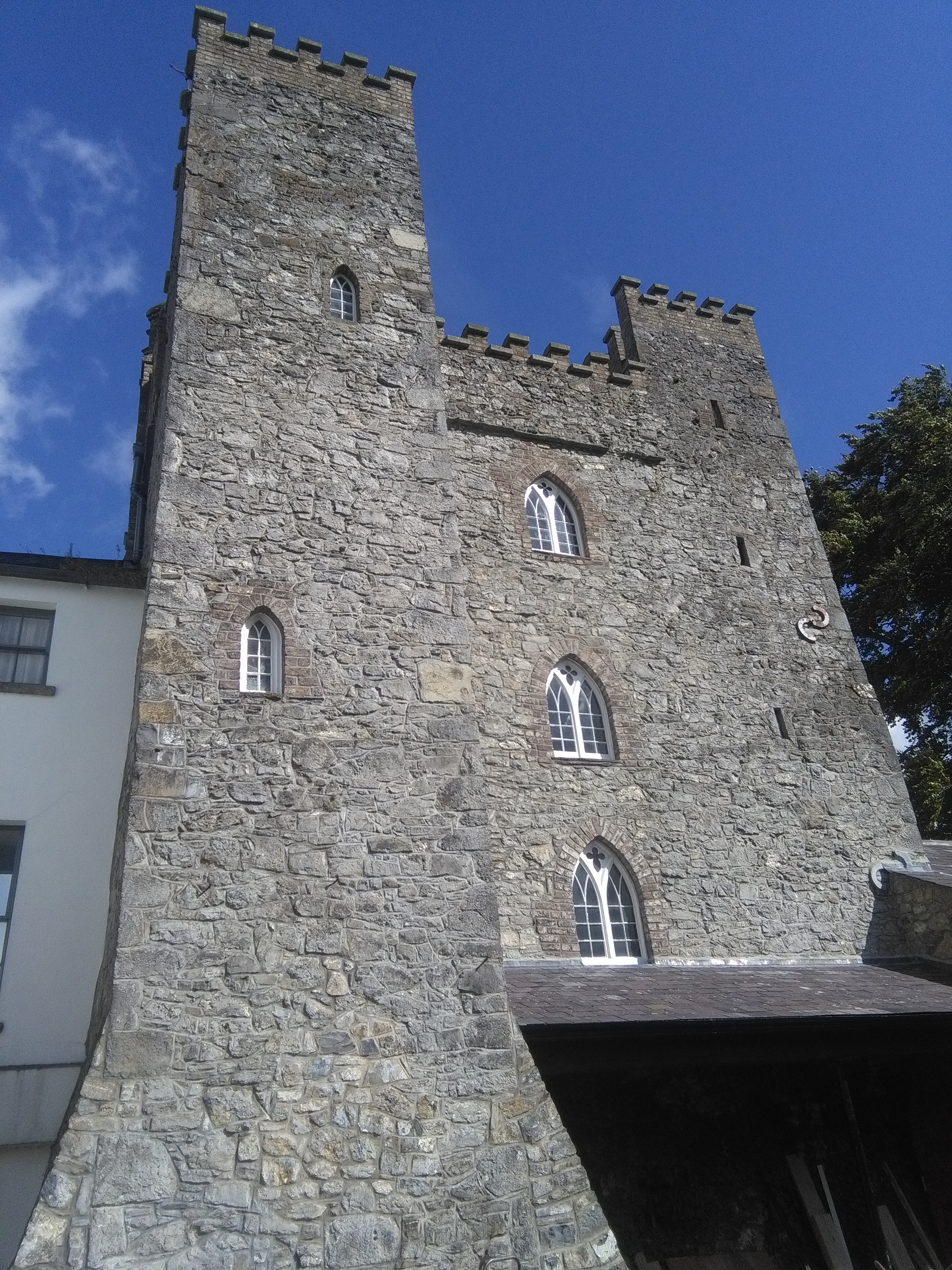
- View of tower and battlements

- Location within Ireland
- 53.323°N 6.61°W
- Type: Castle
- Location: Barberstown, near Straffan, County Kildare, Ireland

History
- Built: c. 1288–1300

Site notes
- Architectural styles: Norman, Elizabethan, Victorian
- Owner: Ken Healy

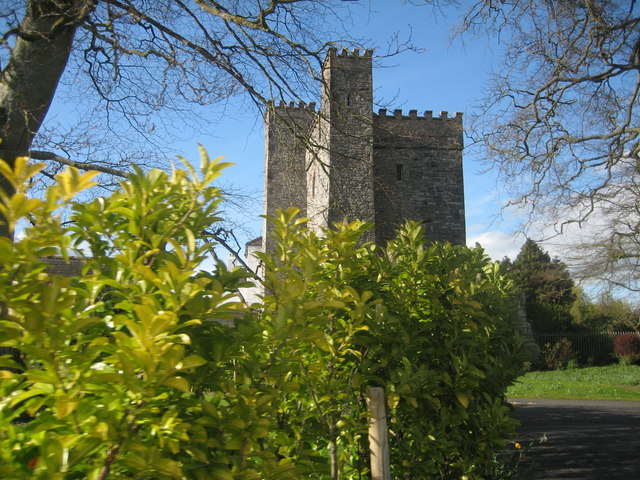
Barberstown Castle

Barberstown Castle is a structure originally built in 1288 in Straffan, County Kildare, Ireland, 25 km (15 miles) west of Dublin. It has been operating as a hotel since 1971 and is surrounded by 20 acres (8.1 ha) of gardens. Renovations in 1996 revealed a previously undiscovered tunnel that links the castle to the nearby church in Straffan and is thought to have been used under the Penal Laws.

== History ==
The castle was built by Nicholas Barby c. 1288 on land originally owned by the Fitzgerald family. In 1630, William Sutton, of one of the foremost families in the area, owned the property.

In 1689 it was confiscated from Lord Kingston by the Earl of Tyrconnell after the accession of King James II of England. It then became the property of the Commissioners of the Revenue who leased it to Roger Kelly in the late 17th century. At the end of that century, it passed through a number of hands, including Bartholomew Vanhomrigh who bought it for £1,033 in 1703, together with 335 acres (135 hectares) of land. Vanhomrigh had been Lord Mayor of Dublin in 1697 and was the father of Vanessa, lover of Dean Swift. He sold it to the Henrys who, under financial pressure, sold it to Hugh Barton of the wine family concerned with the brand Barton and Guestier. He built the last wing of the house in the 1830s; he also built Straffan House, known today at the K Club.

In the 20th century, it was sold by the Huddlestons to a Mrs. Norah Devlin, who converted it into a hotel in 1971. Eric Clapton purchased the property in 1979 and in 1987 sold it to the current owner, Ken Healy, who lives in the property. Healy renovated it from a 10-bedroom guesthouse with three bathrooms to a 59-bedroom 4-star hotel.
