= St. Brigid's Church, Straffan =

- Teampall Bhríde, Teach Srafáin
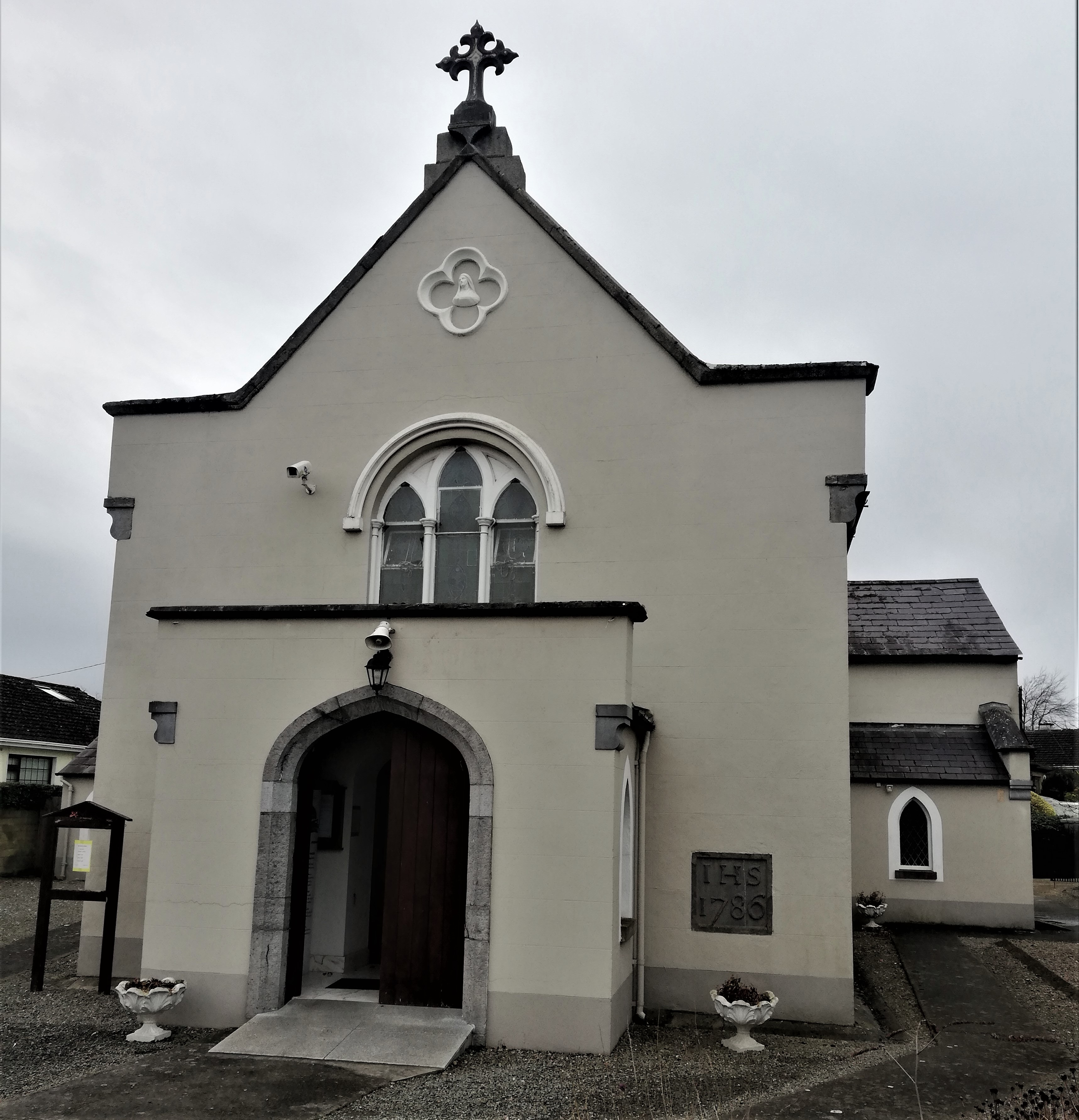
- East entrance

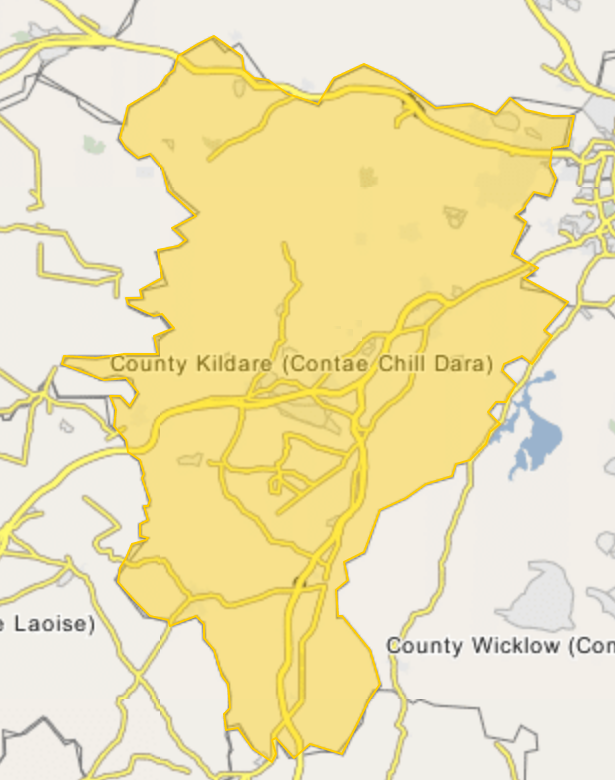
- Location within County Kildare Location within Ireland
- 53°18′45″N 6°36′31″W
- Location: Straffan, County Kildare
- Country: Ireland
- Denomination: Catholic
- Churchmanship: Roman Rite
- Website: https://celstra.ie/

History
- Dedication: Brigit of Kildare
- Dedicated: 1786

Architecture
- Functional status: active
- Style: vernacular
- Groundbreaking: 1786
- Completed: 1788

Specifications
- Length: 22 m (72 ft)
- Width: 9 m (30 ft)
- Materials: limestone, slate, cast iron, stained glass

Administration
- Archdiocese: Dublin
- Deanery: Maynooth
- Parish: Celbridge and Straffan

Saint Brigid's Church is an 18th-century Catholic church in Straffan, Ireland.

== Location ==
St. Brigid's Church is located in the centre of Straffan village, 900 m (½ mile) north of the River Liffey.

== History ==
St. Brigid's Church bears a foundation stone with the date "1786" and the church was consecrated on 28 August 1788. The gates outside were added c. 1860. St. Brigid's was renovated in 1913–15, with a Gothic Revival altar in white and red marble added, as well as the stained-glass windows in the west (probably by Joshua Clarke and Sons).

The church was renovated in 1986 and rededicated by Archbishop of Dublin Kevin McNamara.

== Art and music ==
The church contains:

- Pentecost, a painting by Patrick Pye
- St Brigid Feeding the Poor, painting by Evie Hone
- an ambo, baptismal font and ambry pillar sculpted by Mark Ryan
- Ambry constructed by Jarlath Daly
- a Crucifixion triptych by Katsuya

There is also a two-manual pipe organ. Originally built in Derby in 1914, it was moved to Straffan and rebuilt by Stephen Adams in 2019.

Above the altar is a coved ceiling with acanthus-leaf centrepiece encircled by grape-laden vine tendrils. There are stucco hoodmouldings around the windows with ornamental stops.

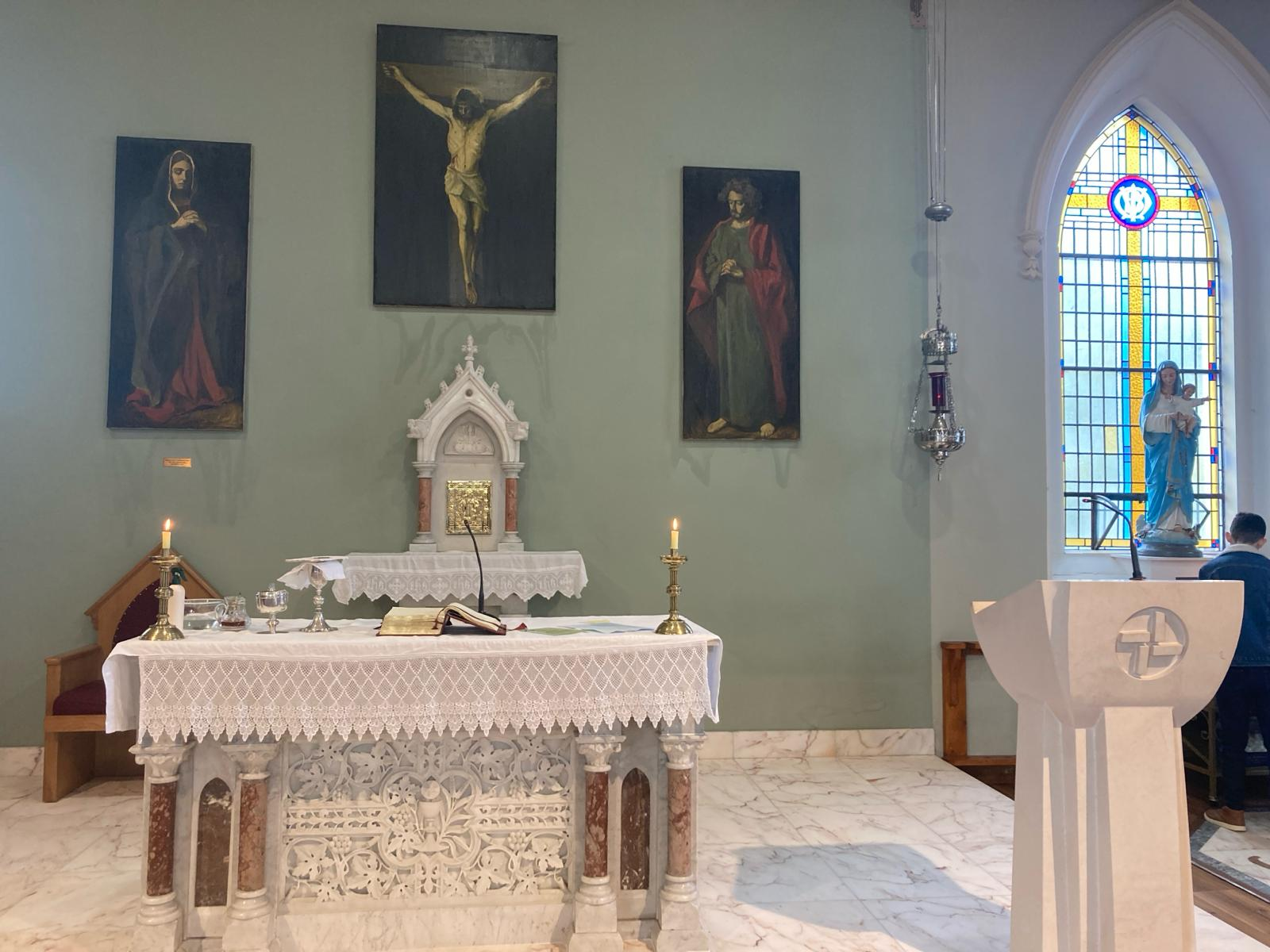
Sanctuary area

== Building ==
St. Brigid's Church is a three-bay Catholic church on a T-shaped plan.

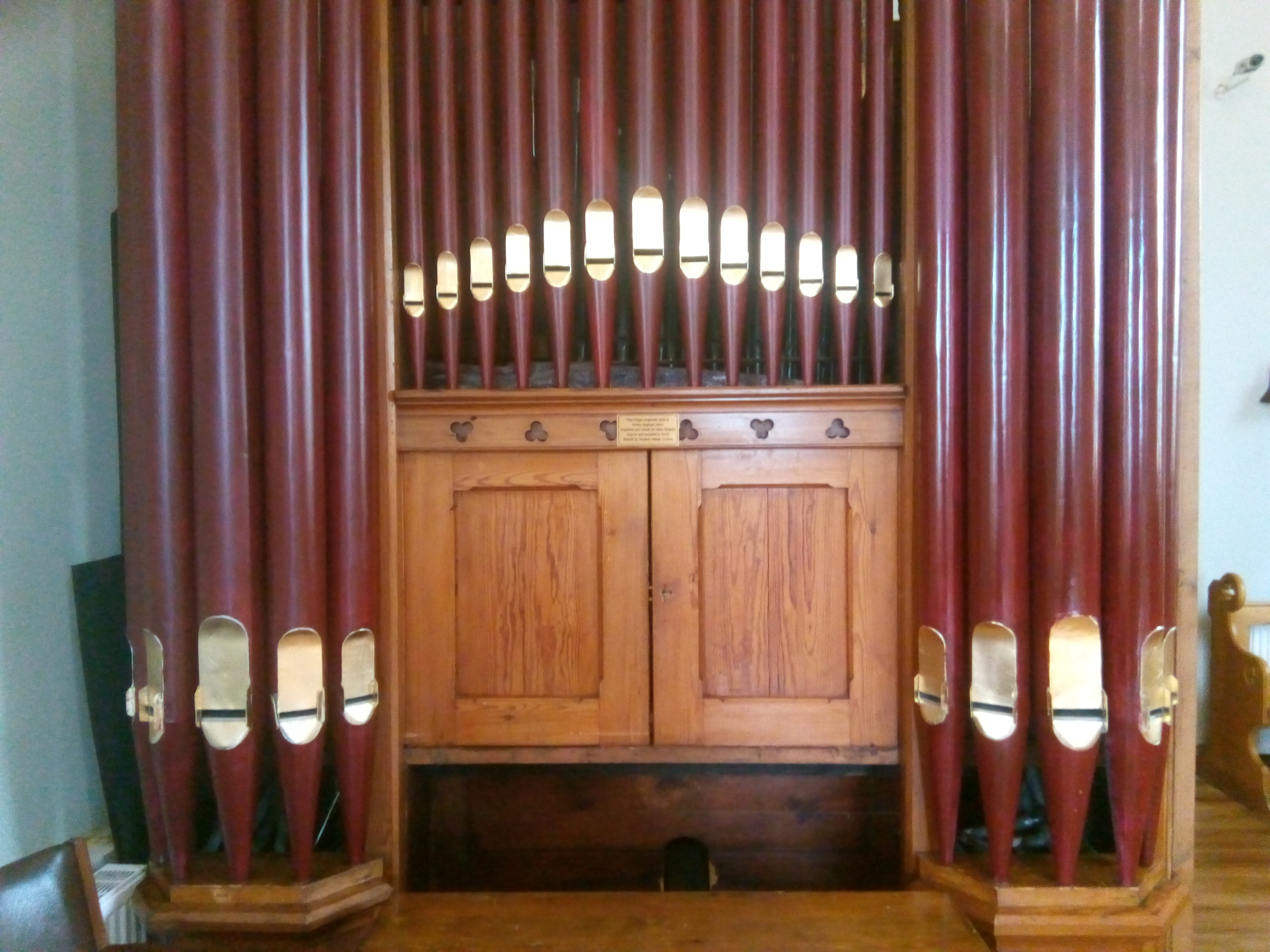
Pipe organ

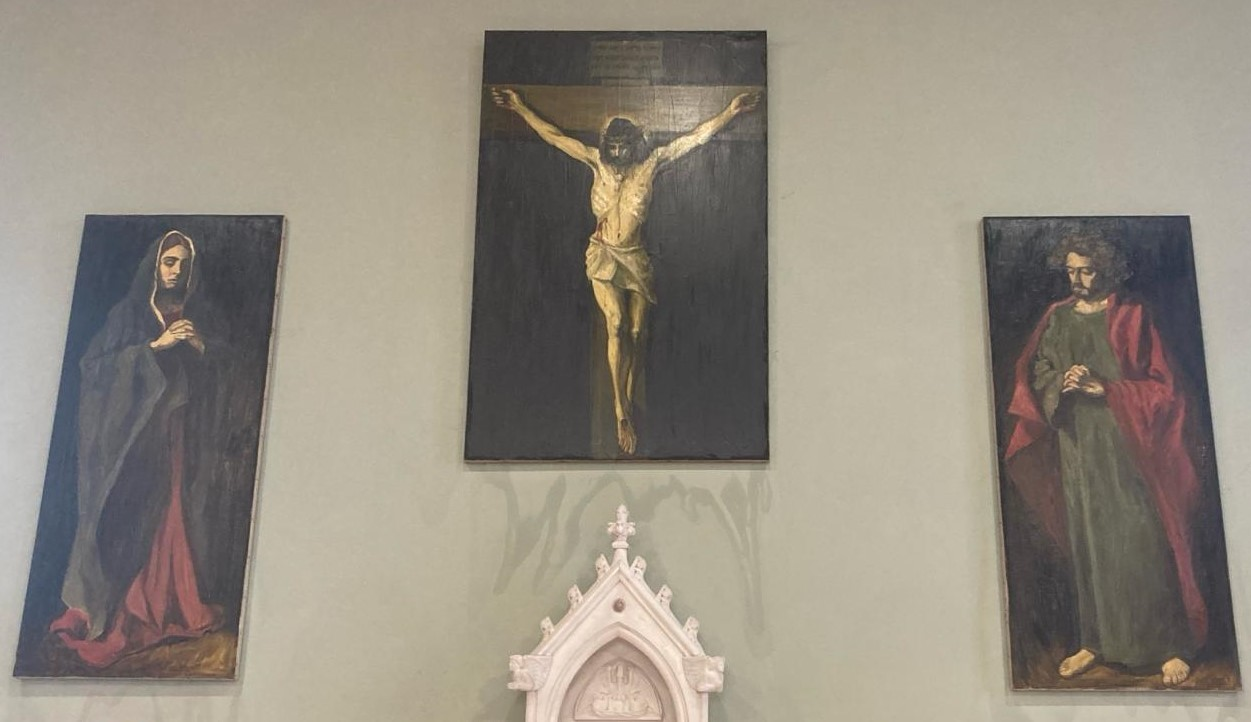
Paintings by Katsuya of Mary, Jesus and John

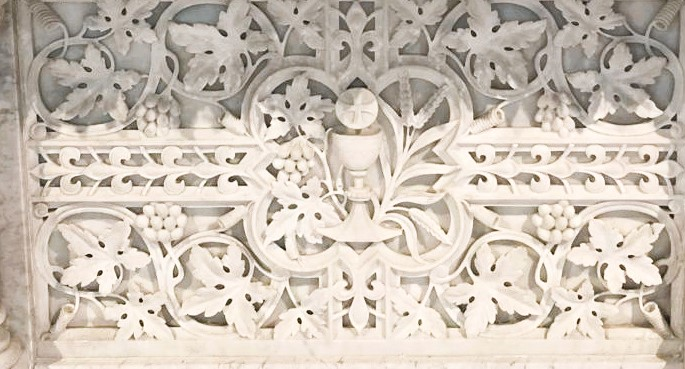
Altar carvings with grapes, vine leaves, fleur-de-lys, wheat, chalice and Eucharist

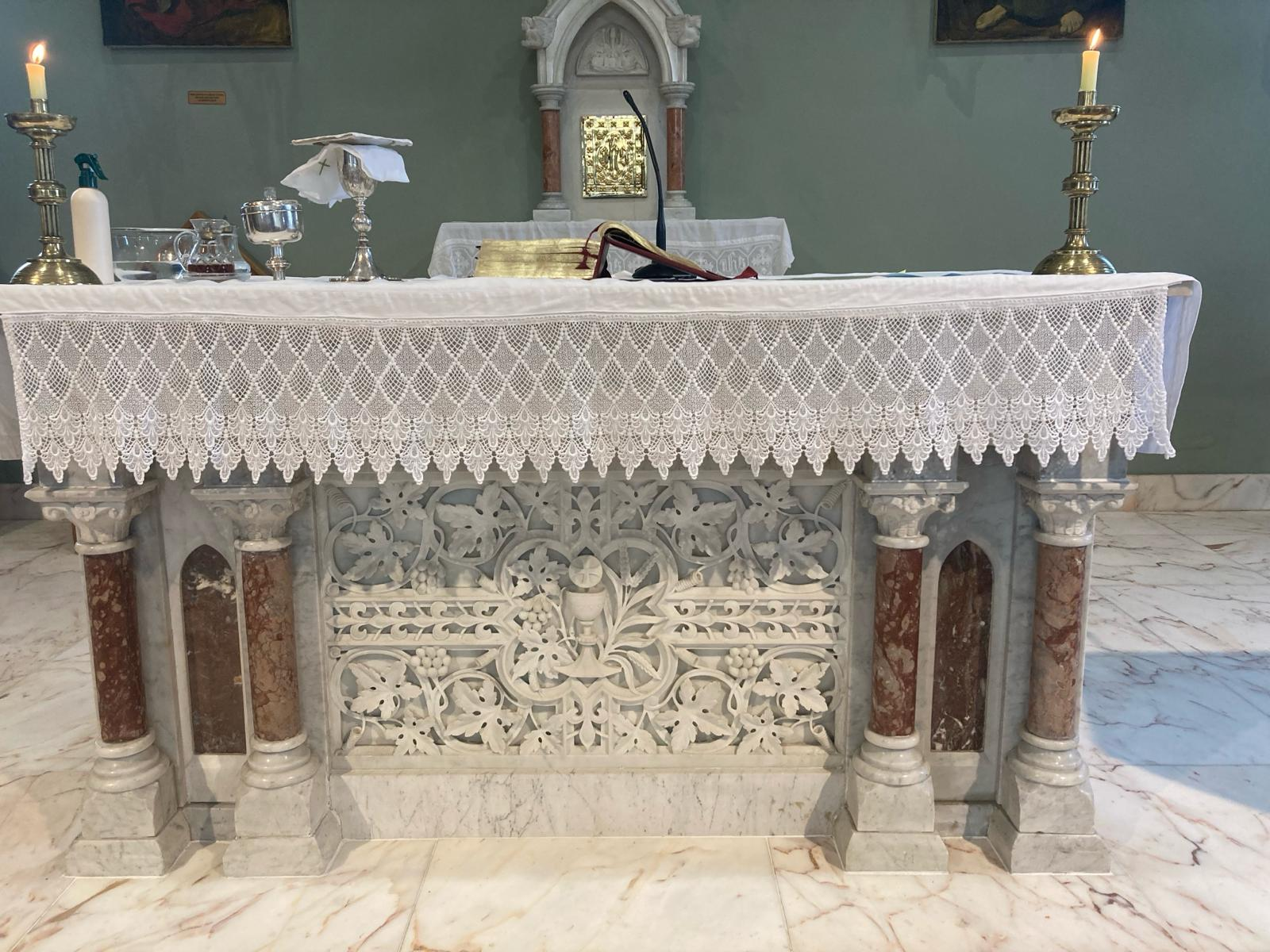
Altar
