= Lumman Tige Srafáin =

Historical Irish poem

Lumman Tige Srafáin is a poem in Dindsenchas Érann explaining the place legend of Straffan, a town and parish in County Kildare, Ireland, situated on the banks of the River Liffey 25 km upstream from the Irish capital Dublin, a place about which the author of the poem declares “a happy omen: this spur of land is a prosperous choice.”

== Background ==
The section of Dindsenchas Érann containing this poem is found in the 12th-century Book of Leinster and was probably composed by Cináed Ua Hartacáin (d. 975). The legends mixed real and fictional events and people to create place legends for the names of about 300 locations in Ireland. Place names are explained by reference to legends which are linked to them by means of pseudo-etymological techniques, where sometimes fictitious stories are adduced to explain the existing names, with the result that some of these legends are only to be found in the Dindshenchas, where they serve their explanatory purpose. The Dindsenchas reflect a mentality in which the land of Ireland is perceived as being completely translated into story: each place has a history which is continuously retold. The expressed mentality of Dindsenchas is to be found throughout all phases of Irish literature. It was part of the body of knowledge medieval Irish poets were expected to master, and the importance attached to the material is reflected in its presence in many of the major manuscripts.

They are not to be taken literally. For example, Dublin, a name derived from the Irish name Dubh Linn, literally the “black pool”, where the Dodder meets the Liffey, is re-imagined through the guise of a legend about a princess who died at the spot where Dublin was built. Instead, it reflects the literary, religious and political hierarchies of the time. During a period of the North Kildare dynasty, the Uí Dúnchada branch of the Uí Dúnlainge kindred were at their most powerful, and supplied ten kings of Leinster from their base on nearby Lyons Hill between 750 and 1050. In choosing the nearby Cnoch Liamhna for mention as one of the “assemblies and noted places in Ireland,” the poem is an indication of the political clout of the local ruling family. Unlike Lumman Tige Srafáin, Liamuin is a poem and part of the metrical Dindsenchas.

An explanation for Straffan is that Teach Srafain is Irish for the house or hermitcell of the local saint, Srafain.

== The poem ==
Lumman of Tech Srafain, whence is it so named? Not hard to say.

Lumman is a name for any shield, that is, ‘lion’, for there was no shield without the image of a lion on it, so that the horror and dread thereof might be magnified; for the lion is fierce and cruel, given to battle and fighting; and these images were made by means of spells and magic lore.

Now Corbb mac Cinain had a shield, such that seven of the kings of Ireland dared not face battle or duel with him. There was at that time a warrior who was also a seer and a poet namely Fer Bern mac Regamna, brother of Find mac Regamna, who had to wife Teite daughter of Mac Nia, from whom Oenach Teite has its name.

Currech mac Cathair, Fothad Cananne and Teite wife of Find mac Regamna were children of the same mother, Fainche tré-chichech, daughter of Airmora of Arada Cliach; and Fer Bern and Find mac Regamna were sons of the same father.

So Fer Bern went, taking with him a poem, to demand the shield from Corbb mac Cinain: and the name Corbb gave the shield was Dubgilla. So the shield was given to Fer Bern, and Fer Bern was glad thereat.

This was the time when the battle of Cerna was brewing between Art mac Cuinn and the men of the Islands, with the Picts of Dal Araide.

So, to prove his shield, Fer Bern fares forth from Bres Bre to Cerna in Brega. He made play with it then in the battle, and it bore the dint of thrice fifty blows: and all said that Fer Bern alone was half the battle on the side of Conn that is, of Art mac Cuinn.

He turns back homeward to seek healing, and reached Tech Strafain: and there succumbs to his wounds. His sharp spear in his hand, his shield slung from his neck, his sword and his scabbard of bronze at his belt, he fell, and told his gillie to dig his grave. Tur was the gillie's name.

The grave was dug: his spear at one side of him, his sword on the other, his shield (lumman) across him:

And he said, ‘The name of this spot shall be Lumman till doomsday:

And at the end of three hundred years from tonight two men shall arrive here and shall be buried over me;

And I shall find welcome from God along with them, however great the slaughter I have wrought.’ Hence Lumman of Tech Strafain.

Dubgilla, dark armour of the back Red yew, vanquisher of polished spears I will name it, a thing that filches our colour, to demand a mantle of grey.

God's counsel for my guidance, in whatever hour or season I approach though there be cloaks with Cinan's son, it is not to gather them that I shall seek,

But a mantle I seek that endures not folding, that neither spike of holly nor branch of tree may catch; that guards, as a brooch guards a cloak; a seemly vestment of the beetle's hue.

It is worth a request at the assembly, after play of blades it was not arrogant: it is a cloak that children cannot rend birthright of a warrior in itself:

The wonted vesture of a king's body, that needle or thread runs not through; a martyr's cloak, a frontlet of the temples, a cloak such as has not been cast over seers.

It guards the brain-pan at all times: it hides the rows of scars beneath: though no nap clings to it, the thread-bare shall last as well as the new cloth.

Not feeble has it proved in the tale of encounters, the stuff whereon has fallen no print of weaver's slay: on the outside it has been found not soft with nap, while it was seen bare of warp or woof,

Without beam of loom for broidery, without rods or implements of weaving, without handiwork of true-born dame, without stretching-pin to strain the web.

Shapely Dubgilla shall clear the way, the guardian of my brows, the heaven-appointed diadem; the cloak that Fer Berna demands without molestation

It is not white, nor grey, nor dun; it is not red, nor blue, nor purple; it is no tartan, striped nor checkered; it is no beribboned garment of ease.

It is lodging for the night, a dry couch, a shelter against woful winds, a cover for the breast, a crown of wealth, through all the blind dark night.

Not dark is my song, no riddle: a theme for the host whom I shall seek out is the mark of my hands they were not smooth: I am Fer Berna from Brius.

I and my naked shield, here were we wounded a load of sickness; after deeds done in the conflict of spears Fer Berna shall lie beneath it.

Hither shall come a noble pair, without charm or spell it shall be a lucky track: they shall lie above me a happy omen: this spur of land is a prosperous choice: they shall decay in God's glorious keeping; they shall drive far from me the devils of darkness.

It will be just three hundred years till the Son of the God of Heaven brings me into a form of brightness without darkness: the way that he establishes is not the way of evil spirits.

Lasting is the judgement after it is promulgated: It is a dismal house without a roof: the omen is no protection, it guards not: it is cause of tears and gloom.’

Thou shalt name without blame this land, though thou goest to meet a flood of woe: the thing that frets my spirit brings me to hardness of darkness.

My straight spear, mine by right no host dared affront it: his was the name I won in the fight of Cerna: “our hope, Fer Berna of the black brows.”

Hard, passing hard is the treasure here, even my sword in its sheath of bronze, and the dark shield that was never reproached: the three have made tryst with darkness.

Together did we whelm the front ranks, and make havoc of every host: together likewise do we lie in the grave, we four stout fighters, in darkness and gnashing of teeth.

Have a care, O Tuir cover us all with the clay preserve my lay, when I lie low beetles are sucking my blood in darkness
