= 1853 Straffan rail accident =

Railway incident in Ireland

Coordinates: 53.321458°N 6.608167°W

Straffan Rail Tragedy

Details
- Date: 5 October 1853
- Location: Straffan, County Kildare
- Country: Ireland
- Cause: Collision with failed train

Statistics
- Trains: 2
- Deaths: 18

The Straffan Rail Disaster occurred on 5 October 1853, when a goods train ran into the back of a stationary passenger train one-quarter mile (400 m) south of Straffan station in County Kildare.

== Background ==
The Great Southern and Western Railway line from Dublin to Cork had only been in operation six years when 18 people died in what is still Ireland's third-worst railway tragedy, having only been surpassed by the Armagh rail disaster of 1889 (80 killed) and the Ballymacarrett rail crash of 1945 (23 killed). It is also the worst railway accident to have occurred in the present-day Republic of Ireland (the other two were both in Northern Ireland).

== Events ==
At 6:20 pm on 5 October 1853, the piston rod on a locomotive snapped, stranding the newly introduced noon express train from Cork 975 yards (892 m) south of Straffan Station, towards Baronrath, in a dense fog and gathering twilight. There were a total of 45 passengers in the two first- and three second-class carriages.

Edward Croker Barrington, a solicitor for the company, who was a passenger on the train, directed the fireman, John O'Hara, to signal a warning to a 20-wagon goods train which had been passed in Portarlington and was approaching from behind, so that it might push the train into Dublin. O'Hara was gone 15 minutes when the goods train was seen approaching and, reassured, some of the passengers got back on their train. However, the goods train crashed into the stationary carriages at full speed, smashing through the first-class carriage at the back of the train, overturning the second-class carriage, shearing the roof off another carriage, and driving the rest one-quarter mile (400 m) the other side of Straffan Station, reduced to "a heap of ruins".

William Hutchinson from Clownings was one of the first on the scene, having gone to the railway line to investigate the stalled train. Dr Geoghegan tended the injured, and Edward Kennedy, who was hunting nearby, helped summon aid. The injured were kept in the station house, and three orphaned children were brought to Lyons House.

== Inquest and enquiry ==
The inquest was performed initially at Straffan station house and adjourned to Barry's Hotel at Thirteenth Lock. The victims came from Cork, Mallow, Kenmare, Birr, Laois, Kildare and Dublin, and included Jesse Hall from County Kildare, Daniel and Anastasia McSwiney of Kenmare, TW Jelly of Straboe, John Egan of Birr, Emma Pack of Birr, Kate Hamilton Haimes, (the wife of a mill owner from Mallow, originally identified from a note in her pocket by her maiden name, Kate Smith), Christopher McNally, a solicitor of Dublin, Claire Kirwan from 82 Lwr Abbey St in Dublin, Margaret Leathley from 62 Eccles St in Dublin, Joseph Sherwood a servant boy of the household of Richard Stokes, Cherry Agnes Knapp from London, Margaret Palmer, a cousin of Mrs Knapp, William Bateman a solicitor from Cork, Mrs Latham Blacker from London and four children. A total of £27,000 compensation was paid to victims, the equivalent of €2.37m today.

The unionist Dublin Evening Mail alleged that the bodies of the dead and the dying were plundered by local people, an allegation disproved by the inquest and condemned by the rival Freeman's Journal: "The people did not plunder the dead and dying but, on the contrary, assisted with the greatest alacrity and to the utmost of their power." The only criticism at the inquest was of a carter named Connor, from Celbridge, who refused to carry the wounded until he was given half a crown.

The inquiry found that no warning was given by either red light or detonators. The fireman, John O'Hara, the engine driver, James Gass, and the guard of the luggage train, James Prey, were arrested.

Commenting on the accident, an editorial in The Times of London called for clockwork event recorders to be carried in locked boxes on all trains in the United Kingdom.

== Folklore: The Ghost Story ==
According to Ireland's Own, the Wexford weekly magazine which reports the supernatural, the site of the crash has been haunted by a man with a red lamp ever since.

== Allingham Poem ==
The magic car of modern skill,

Nor hour nor distance heeds;
With heat and roar and whistle shrill,
On through the dusk it speeds.

Our friends in Dublin city gay,
Expectant name our names;
"The fog is out to-night," they say,
And stir the kindly flames.

Oh! chiller than October's touch
Is freezing many a smile!
Terror and mortal torments clutch
What love expects the while.

Love's self, however true and warm,
Might fail to recognise
The dear, the well-remember'd form,
If set before its eyes

'Mong twisted metal, splinter'd wood,
Half buried in the ground,
'Mong heaps of limbs crush'd up in blood,
Must wife, child, friend he found.

No hostile cannonade, or mine,
Perform'd the cruel wrong;
Through peaceful fields they sped to join

The city's sprightly throng.

— William Allingham, (included in Day and Night Songs, 1854).

== Sources ==
- Eoghan Corry and Jim Tancred: The Annals of Ardclough (2004).
