= Whitechurch, County Kildare =

Whitechurch An Teampall Geal
- Townland
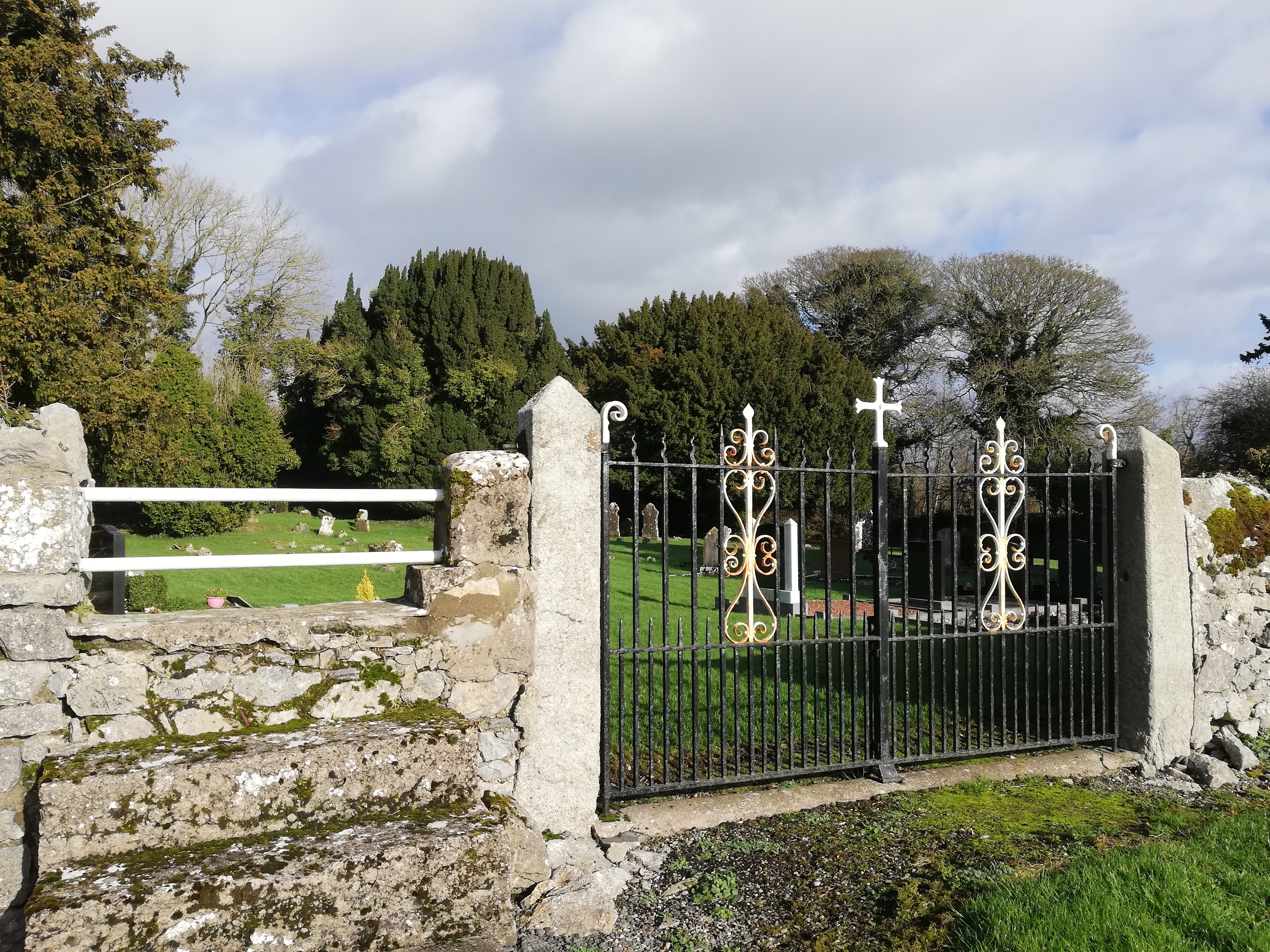
- Gate to Whitechurch monastic ruins

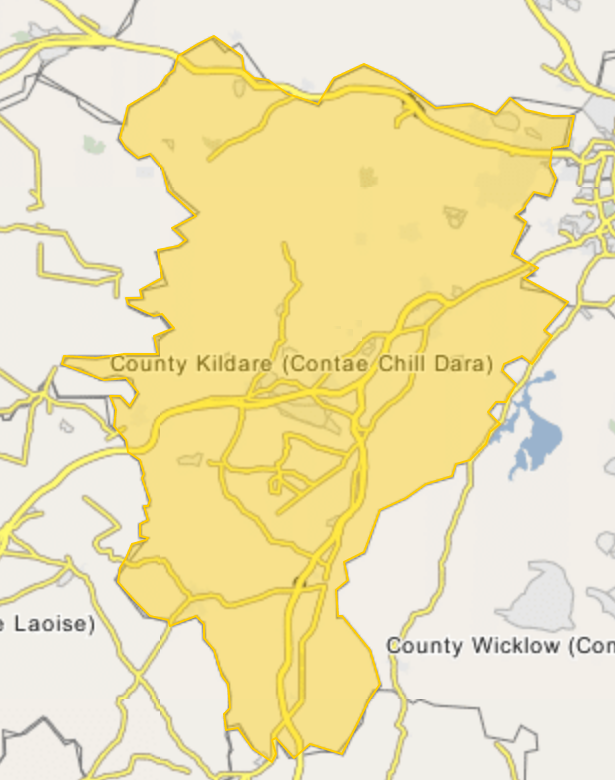
- Location in County Kildare
- Coordinates: 53°17′15″N 6°36′14″W
- Country: Ireland
- Province: Leinster
- County: County Kildare
- Elevation: 70 m (230 ft)
- Time zone: UTC+0 (WET)
  - Summer (DST): UTC-1 (IST (WEST))

Whitechurch (Irish: An Teampall Geal) is a townland, monastic site, and civil parish in County Kildare, Ireland. It is situated between Straffan and Kill, near the M7 motorway.

== Etymology and history ==
The name comes from the Whitefriars (Carmelites) who had a monastery on the site established in 1300 and enfifed in 1506. The church was vacated by the early 17th century.

== Medieval landmarks ==
A well-preserved moated site at Puddlehall, located at 53°17′29″N 6°35′57″W, dates to the 13th century and was cited by University College Dublin Professor Sean O Riordain as one of the "finest examples of a moated house in Ireland". The remains of a castle are also to be found on the church grounds.

== Calendar and civil paper references ==
Whitechurch

Historical population
Year	Pop.	±%
1821	346	—
1831	279	−19.4%
1841	320	+14.7%
1851	269	−15.9%
1861	231	−14.1%
1871	187	−19.0%
1881	189	+1.1%
1891	223	+18.0%
1901	181	−18.8%
1911	209	+15.5%

Ecclesia Templi Albi was granted to the order of St John in 1300. In 1508 William Preston enfifed Archdeacon Robert Sutton and Thomas Cornwalshe, Vicar of Stamullen, with the manor of Whitechurch (alias Tullaghtipper), "containing the town and lands of le Tunryng (alias Surnyng), Clonyng, Killenmore, Killbregaghe, Killussy, Rathmore, Collenbakeston, Ardress, Cloghle, Osberiston and Clanswhiche".In 1541 the tithes of the Rectory of Whitechurch (18 couples of grain, £12) were held by David Sutton and Richard Aylmer. In 1557 Patrick Sarsfield of Tisteldalen, great great granduncle of Patrick Sarsfield of Siege of Limerick fame, obtained a pardon from the English colonial government and in 1560 obtained the lease of White Church alias Tullatipper. Whitechurch and Lyons castles are identified on map by Baptista Boazio and Renold Elstrack in 1599 – a copy can be viewed at the public library in Tallaght Local Landowners in the 1654 civil survey include Alerian, Weisley of Daingan, John Bath of Culpe, William Sarsfield of Lucan, Edward Allen of Bishopscourt and Robert Rochford of Kilbride. Maurice Eustace of Whitechurch was named by his father in a 1663 letter to Lord Justice of Ireland.

== Whitechurch/Baronrath attack on train line ==
On 22 June 1975, Whitechurch resident Christy Phelan was stabbed to death when he engaged a group of men planting a bomb on the railway line near Baronrath, Straffan, designed to derail a train headed for the Republican Wolfe Tone commemoration at Bodenstown. His intervention prevented greater loss of life; the bomb exploded eight minutes after the train had passed by. The death was one of a number forming the subject of investigation by the Barron Commission into "deniable" undercover operations by British forces against civilian targets in the Republic of Ireland during The Troubles.

== Bibliography ==
- Ardclough Churches 1985 Souvenir Brochure.
- Corry, Eoghan and Tancred, Jim: Annals of Ardclough (Ardclough GAA 2004).
- Journals of the Kildare Archaeological Society: Volume III : 483. Volume IV : 114 Volume V : 406
