= St. Patrick's Church, Straffan =

St. Patrick's Church
- Teampall Phádraig

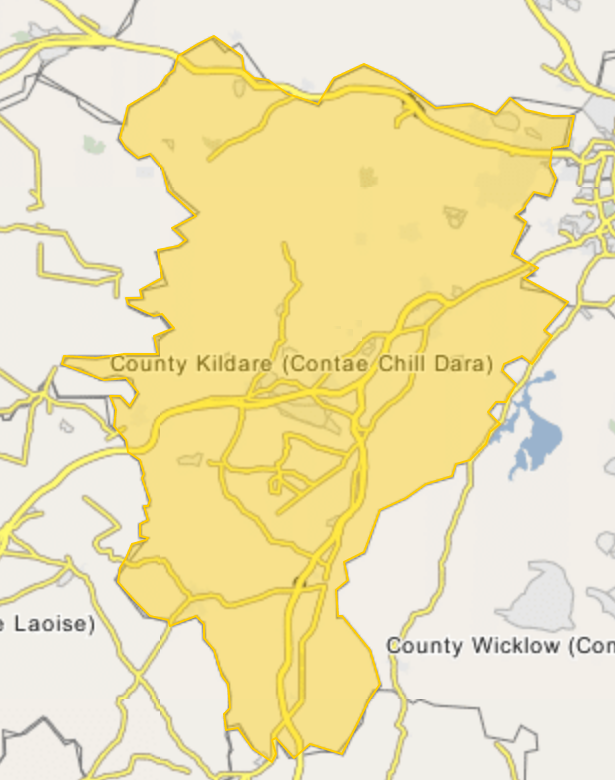
- Location within County Kildare
- 53.311423°N 6.610659°W
- Location: Straffan, County Kildare
- Country: Ireland
- Denomination: Church of Ireland
- Previous denomination: Pre-Reformation Catholic

History
- Founded: early 13th century
- Dedication: Saint Patrick

Architecture
- Functional status: ruined
- Closed: 1838

Specifications
- Length: 21.5 m (71 ft)
- Width: 6.3 m (21 ft)
- Materials: stone

Administration
- Diocese: Dublin and Glendalough

Saint Patrick's Church, also called Old Straffan Church, is a ruined medieval church in Straffan, Ireland.

== Location ==
St. Patrick's Church is located in the centre of Straffan village, 760 m (½ mile) north of the River Liffey.

== History ==
St. Patrick’s Church, Straffan was built in the early 13th century. It is recorded that St Patrick's was incorporated into the Hospital of Saint John outside Newgate, Dublin c. 1250 which would suggest its construction at an earlier time.

The vicarage was suppressed in 1397 and was united with Saint John’s Hospital. In 1531 Archbishop John Alen restored the vicarage.

The church may have served as a safe house for persecuted clergy. The nave was ruined by 1630.

The church was replaced by the modern church in 1838.

The church is located within a modern graveyard, accessible by a lychgate, built c. 1920.

== Building ==
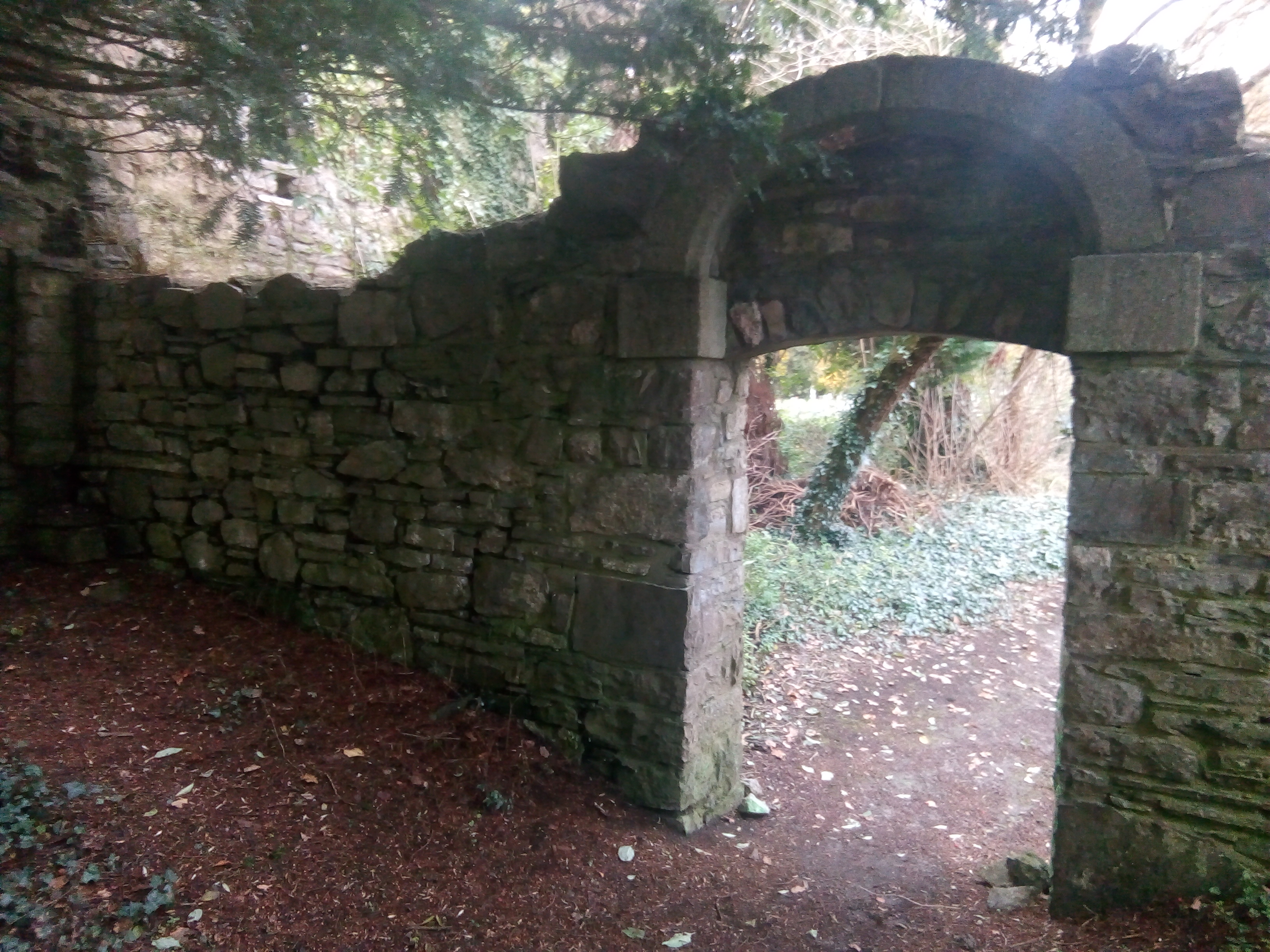
Arched doorway in the east wall

St. Patrick's Church is 100 ft (30 m) long, with a fortified tower house of four storeys attached to its west end, with a bell-cote on top. The tower has a stair-turret in the southwest and has had later buttresses added to the north and south.

The entrance door is to the south with a modern granite arch; otherwise the church is of rubble with limestone dressings. There are three cusped, ogee-headed and chamfered single-light windows — two in the south and one in the north. There are roughly-dressed quoins on the east wall.

Most of the northern wall has fallen. A 19th-century account mentions a small stone oratory to the south, which has since been demolished.

== Gallery ==
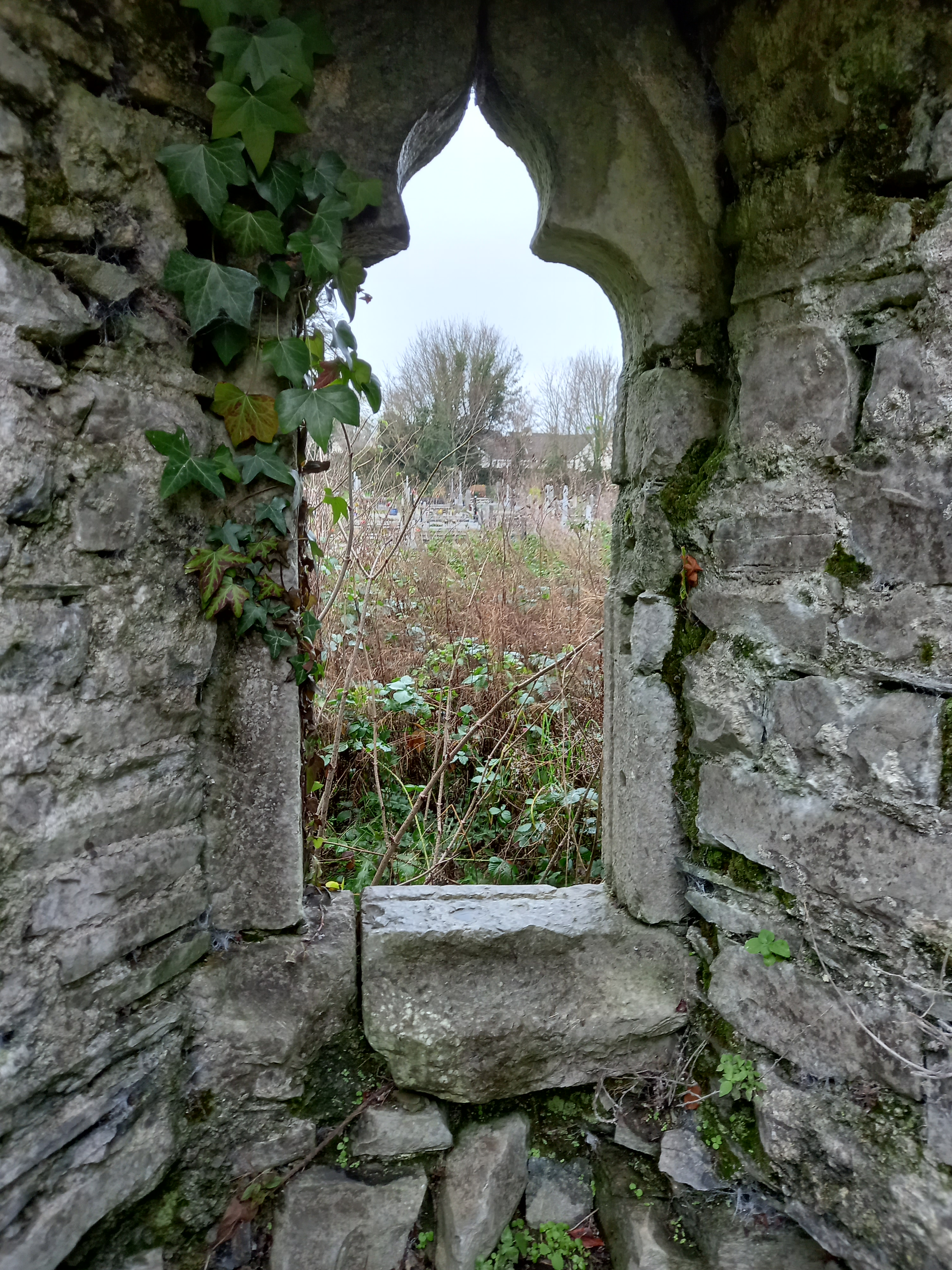
East window

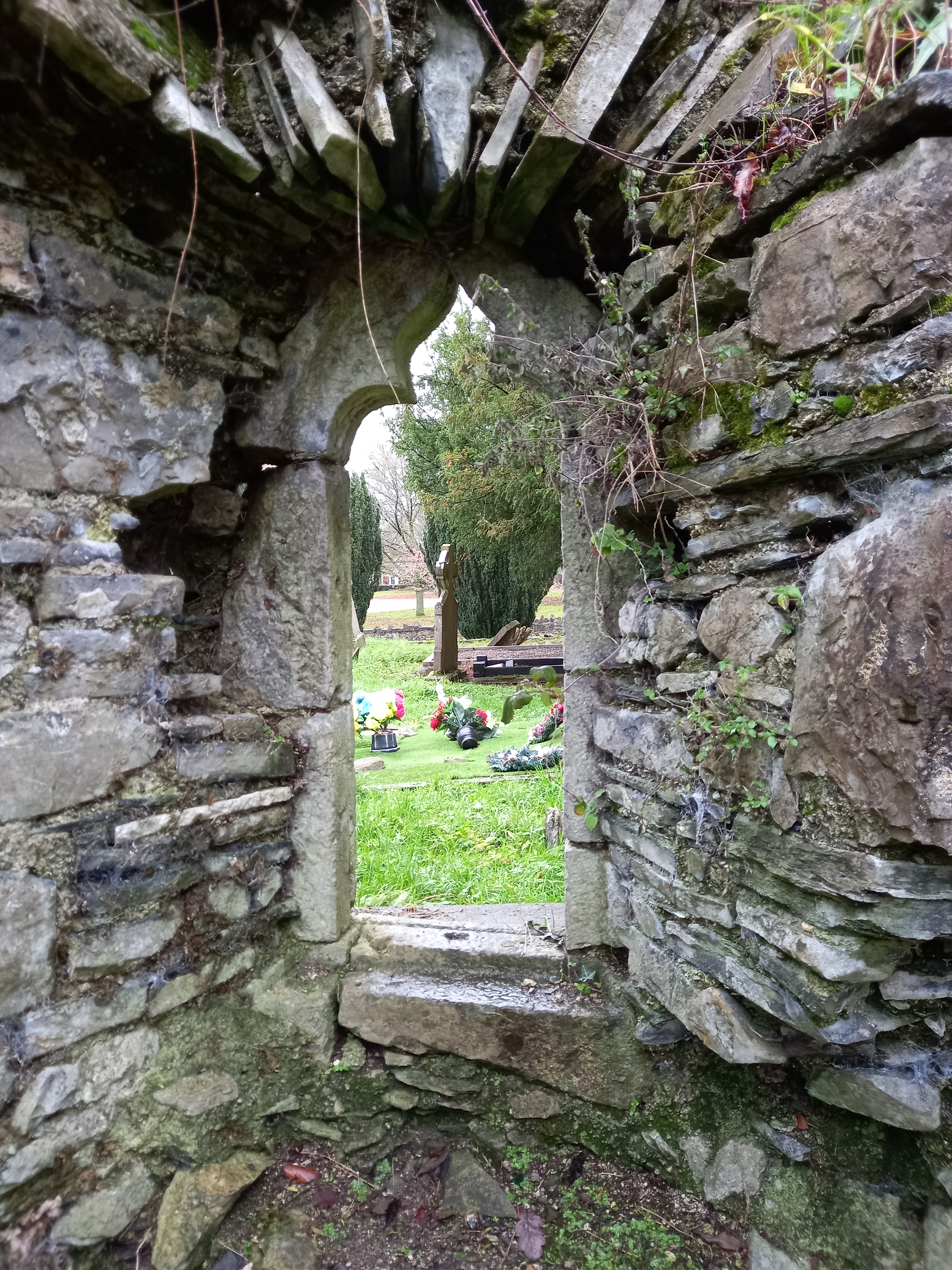
West window

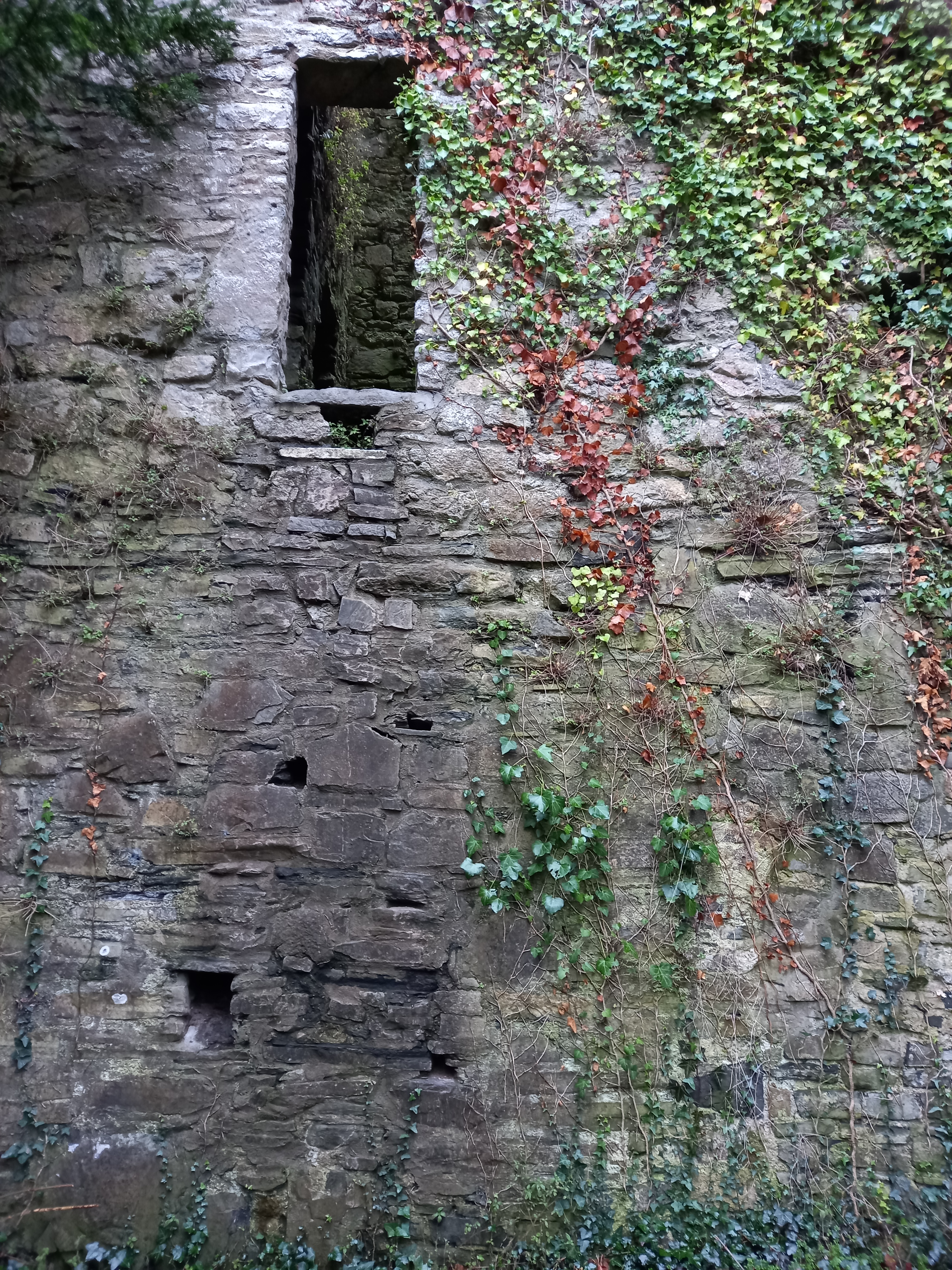
north wall of the church; postholes where wooden steps allowed access to the tower are visible.

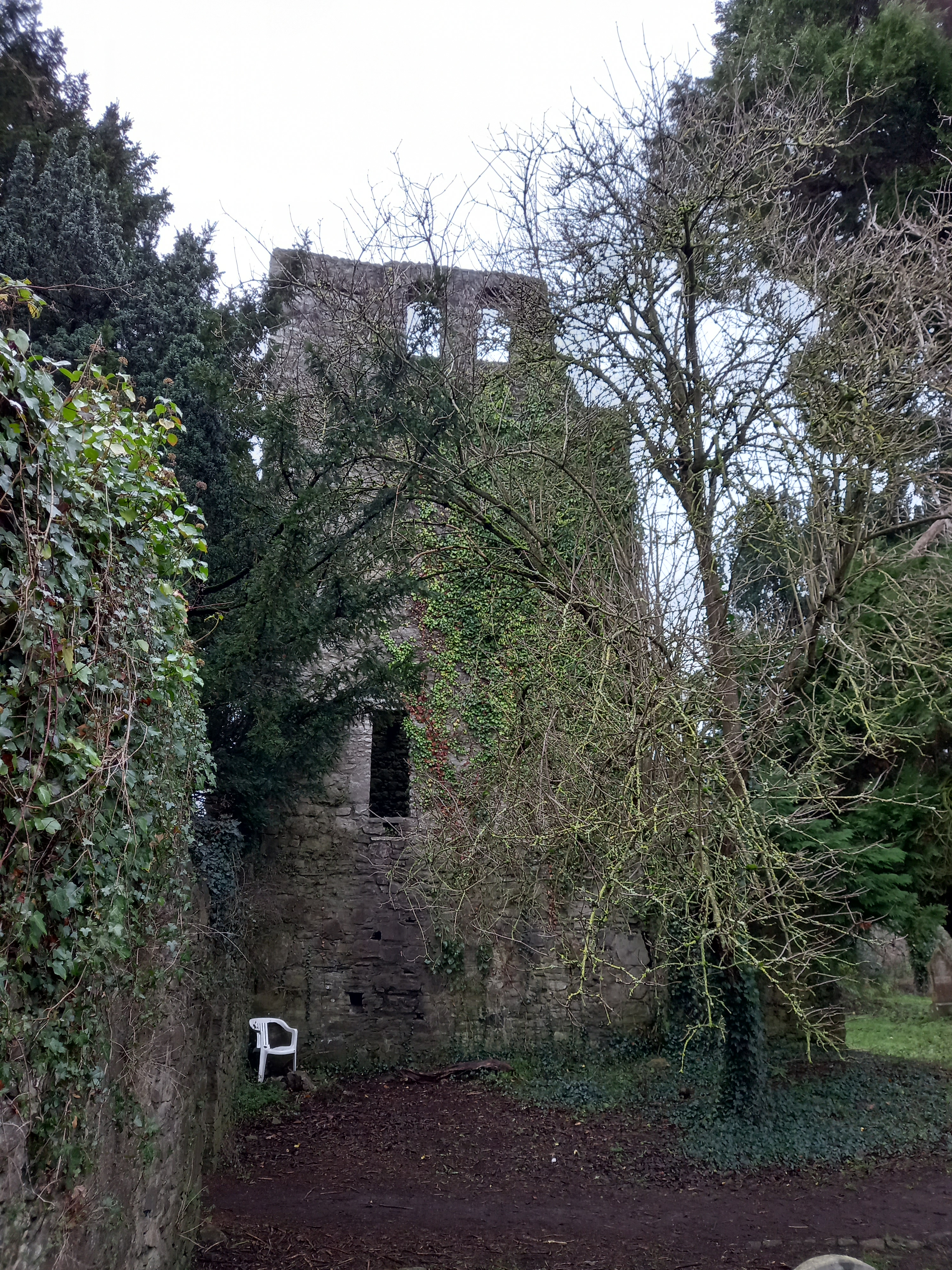
View of fortified tower from the south
