= Straffan =

Village in County Kildare, Ireland

Straffan Teach Srafáin (Irish)
- Village
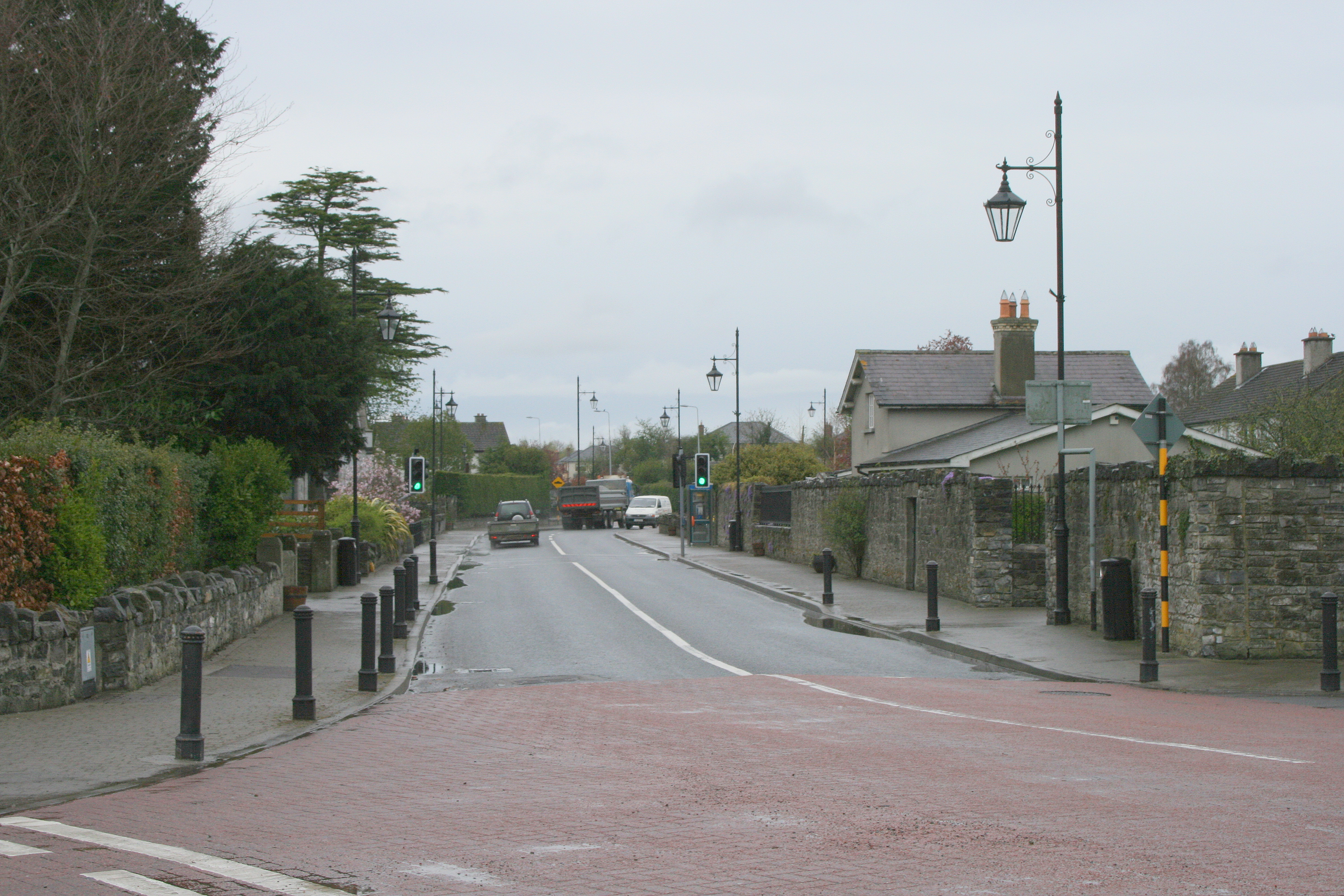
- Barberstown Road

- Location in Ireland
- Coordinates: 53°18′45″N 6°36′28″W
- Country: Ireland
- Province: Leinster
- County: County Kildare
- Elevation: 70 m (230 ft)

Population (2022)
  - Total: 1,158
- Time zone: UTC±0 (WET)
  - Summer (DST): UTC+1 (IST)
- Eircode routing key: W23
- Telephone area code: +353(0)1

Straffan (Irish: Teach Srafáin) is a village in County Kildare, Ireland. It is situated on the banks of the River Liffey, 25 km upstream of the Irish capital Dublin. As of the 2022 census, the village had a population of 1,158, an over three-fold increase (from 332) since the 2002 census.

Straffan is the name of the surrounding electoral division which is within the 'Celbridge Number 1 Rural Area', and which (as of 2006) had a population of 1,449. At one time a separate parish, it is today joined to the parishes of Celbridge (in the Roman Catholic structure) and Celbridge and Newcastle (Church of Ireland), in the respective Dublin dioceses.

Straffan is home to the K Club, formally the Kildare Hotel and Golf Club, and its two championship golf courses. These courses have staged several international tournaments, including the European Open (hosted annually there between 1995 and 2007) and the Ryder Cup tournament (held at the K Club in 2006).

== Geography ==
=== Location ===
Straffan is situated at a low lying point in the Liffey valley and is surrounded by flood meadows along the Liffey and River Morell. Agriculture is important to the local economy. Since the 18th century, Straffan farmers were prominent in the prize lists at events run by the Royal Dublin Society. The research station for the agriculture department of University College Dublin is situated at nearby Lyons Hill. As with the rest of County Kildare, racehorse breeding and training is common in the area. In the 1920s, Straffan Station stud was one of the leading horse breeding studs in the country when owned by Edward "Cub" Kennedy.

=== Contemporary village ===
The contemporary village is concentrated around two crossroads on which are situated a Roman Catholic church and Church of Ireland respectively. Development evolved through the building of estate houses (1880), land commission cottages (1922–39), the Murray local council cottages (1949), and eight estates around the village. Housing developments also took place on the grounds of the K Club in the 2000–2004 period. As of 2007, a planning application had been lodged with Kildare County Council to develop a separate town to the south west at Turnings.

== Etymology ==
Historical population (surrounding electoral division)
Year	Pop.	±%
1821	773	—
1831	727	−6.0%
1841	614	−15.5%
1851	535	−12.9%
1861	608	+13.6%
1871	616	+1.3%
1881	632	+2.6%
1891	623	−1.4%
1901	591	−5.1%
1911	589	−0.3%
1926	531	−9.8%
1936	518	−2.4%
1946	586	+13.1%
1951	632	+7.8%
1956	731	+15.7%
1961	763	+4.4%
1966	810	+6.2%
1971	871	+7.5%
1979	1,035	+18.8%
1981	1,218	+17.7%
1986	1,247	+2.4%
1991	1,301	+4.3%
1996	1,358	+4.4%
2002	1,305	−3.9%
2006	1,449	+11.0%
2011	1,498	+3.4%

The village is named for St. Srafán, whose feast day in the Martyrology of Tallaght was 23 May. Straffan was also one of 300 Irish locations accorded its own place-legend in Dinnshenchas Érenn (Metrical (ed. Edward Gwynn 1924) iv, pp 328–331). It consisted of a poem called "Lumman Tige Srafain", about a warrior named Lumann who possessed a wonderful shield and who, according to the poem, died of his wounds at Tech Srafáin. Two forms of the name cited in the tale, Tech Srafáin and Tige Srafáin, are Middle Irish nominative and genitive case forms. The spelling Strafáin is unusual. "Straphan" or "Straffan" is a shortened Anglicised form of the original Irish Teach Srafáin (the initial Str- is the usual development of Irish Sr in English).

The second Irish name of the village is Cluainíní; this refers to the townland of Clownings, to the east of the village. This was formerly the site of Straffan railway station and the post office, and so it has been erroneously used as an Irish name for Straffan itself.

Dinnshenchas Érenn, probably composed by Cináed Ua Hartacáin (d. 975), also selected the nearby Cnoch Liamhna for mention as one of the "assemblies and noted places in Ireland", an indication of the strength of the local ruling family, the Uí Dúnchada branch of the Uí Dúnlainge who supplied ten kings of Leinster from their base on nearby Lyons Hill between 750 and 1050.

Sruthán (stream) was mistakenly cited by Thomas O'Connor in the Ordnance Survey Letters in 1837, and adopted as the Irish form of Straffan. Seosamh Laoide used it in his list of Irish names of post-offices published in Post-Sheanchas (1905). An Sruthán gained currency among those involved in the Irish revival and was promoted as name in the local schools. Research by Domhnall mac Giolla Easpaig declares it "completely at odds with the written evidence cited above and with local pronunciation and appears to be no more than an ad hoc explanation of the name by O'Connor's informant." Sruthán is anglicised struffaun in some parts of the country. One would not expect to find it rendered thus in the Straffan area".

The village post office, opened c. 1845, was closed in April 1924. A separate office was opened at Straffan Station in May 1872, this adjacent to the former station, 1.5 mi (2.5 km) from the village. On the adoption of Irish language names by the Department of Posts and Telegraphs in the 1920s, the name of Cluainíní was adopted for the station office, this being the Irish version of Clownings, the townland in which the post office and former station were situated. That office was closed c. 1977 at which date the office in the village was reopened and the Irish name of Teach Srafáin was adopted, this name appearing in the 1982 Post Office Guide.

== History ==
The area was ravaged in the wars of 1641–2. The Lords of the Pale who allied with Rory O'More in 1642 included Nicholas Wogan of Rathcoffey (member of the Council of War), Andrew Aylmer of Donadea, Nicholas Sutton of Barberstown, John Gaydon of Irishtown (whose estate included the present Straffan), Garret Sutton of Richardstown and James Eustace of Clongowes. In 1641 Lyons Castle was taken and sacked on the orders of the new LJs William Parsons and John Borlase and two castles belonging to Edward Tipper of Tipperstown burned

When James Butler, 12th Earl of Ormond marched into Kildare in 1642, he burned Lyons, Newcastle and Oughterard on 1 February 1642.

General George Monck landed in Dublin in February 1642 for the parliamentarians and camped in Straffan (the horses field at Ardrass is named as his camp). Rathcoffey was besieged and taken by Monck in June 1642, 70 of the garrison made prisoners and later executed in Dublin. During the campaign Kildare county was burned "for 17 miles (27 km) in length and 25 in breadth." William Petty's Census of 1659 recorded "Barbiestowne" with 36 people and Straffan with 23 people, surnames among them included Byrne, Kelly, Doyle, Malone and Murphy.

According to depositions taken after the battle of Ovidstown, a party of 1798 Rebels met at Straffan Bridge including Patrick O'Connor 'a lawyer from Straffan', and spent some time in stables of Straffan Lodge (18 June). In 1803 Straffan men marched to Dublin to join Emmet's rebellion, while Barney Daly's pub in Baronrath was used as a rendez-vous.

Local landowner Valentine Lawless, later the second Baron Cloncurry, was sworn into United Irishmen by James O'Coigly. He was elected colonel of United Irishmen in Kildare, was the last proprietor of 'The Press' (United Irish newspaper) and became the United Irish organiser in London until his arrest and detention in the Tower of London. He was also related to Robert Emmet and according to Emmet's biographer Ruan O'Donnell provided a link between 1798 and 1803, waiting in Paris for word of success of the rebellion and was to be member of Emmet's government. O'Donnell describes as "disingenuous" Lawless's 1857 account of how he had pleaded with Emmet not to return to Dublin. The Sammon family form Straffan and the Pitts family from Bishopscourt were listed among the rebels.

On 22 January 1812, 100 persons assembled at night with carts for the purpose of retrieving hay which had been seized in lieu of rent. Leading to a confrontation during which Patrick King was shot dead. As a result of the incident, a request was made to have the military at Celbridge strengthened. Eventually in 1871 a neo-gothic RIC barracks was built in the village with distinctive gun turrets designed to repel invading Fenians. The barracks was vacated and passed into private hands in March 1905.

=== War of Independence and the Troubles ===
A National League branch for Celbridge and Straffan was established on 24 September 1887. Bertram H. Barton was a member of the Unionist Party and instigator of a sedition charge against the Principal of Ardclough School in 1917. Straffan casualties in the Great War included James Cash, (died 27 May 1918), D.A. Carden (4 September 1915), Thomas Goucher (22 January 1918), Ronald B.C. Kennedy (died of illness, 18 August 1917), G. Kinahan (14 October 1916), William Lawless (15 September 1917), and Peter McLeish, (21 January 1918). Francis Salmon was a civilian casualty in the Easter Rising of 1916.

A branch of the Irish National Volunteers was formed in Straffan in 1914. The St Anne's Brass Band from Ardclough played at the Bodenstown commemoration in 1914 at which Thomas Clarke spoke. In February 1917 a Company was reformed in Straffan and a branch of Sinn Féin formed in 1918. Volunteers planned to bomb the bridge at Straffan but the plan was aborted. Telephone wires were destroyed at Bishopscourt and Straffan volunteers took part in the ambush at Stacumny on 5 July 1921. Prominent local volunteers included John Logie, Tom Cornelia, James Travers and John McSweeney. During the Civil war the barnewall homestead near the 13th Lock in Lyons was the North Kildare brigade headquarters for the anti-treaty IRA.

On 22 June 1975 a local man, Christopher Phelan, was stabbed to death when he delayed an attempt to derail a train passing on the main Dublin to Cork railway line by Loyalist paramilitaries near Baronrath bridge, who aimed to derail a train of republicans going to Bodenstown. His intervention saved the lives of 200 people on the train as it delayed the detonation of the bomb which blew a 3-foot (0.91 m) gap in the track.

On 31 March 1976 the biggest train robbery in Irish history took place at Wheatfield. Eight men in fluorescent jackets used emergency signals to stop the mail train bound from Cork to Dublin and escaped with £600,000 in small denomination notes. The incident became the centre of a celebrated miscarriage of justice case, known mistakenly as the Sallins Train Robbery case after the nearest rail station then open, when three men were wrongly convicted of the robbery.

=== Straffan Estate and its owners ===
In 1171, Trachstraphli was granted to Maurice Fitzgerald by Richard de Clare (Strongbow). In c1185 -1189 Gerald Fitzgerald was accorded "Trachstraphli" in the Red Book of the Earls of Kildare (G. MacNiocaill, ed., Dublin, 1964). In 1288 Sir John Fannyn conveyed Straffan and Ballespaddagh (Irishtown) to Richard Le Penkiston on a deed witnessed by Richard de la Salle, John Posswick and Nicholas Barby, each of whom gave their names to surrounding townlands, Sealstown (de la Salle), Possextown (Posswick) and Barberstown (Barby). In 1473 Suttons held the land as tenants and the land passed to John Gaydon (1490), Thomas Boules (1653), Richard Talbot (1679), John White (1691), Robert Delap (1717) and Dublin Banker Hugh Henry who purchased the house for £2,200 in 1731.

=== Henry family ===
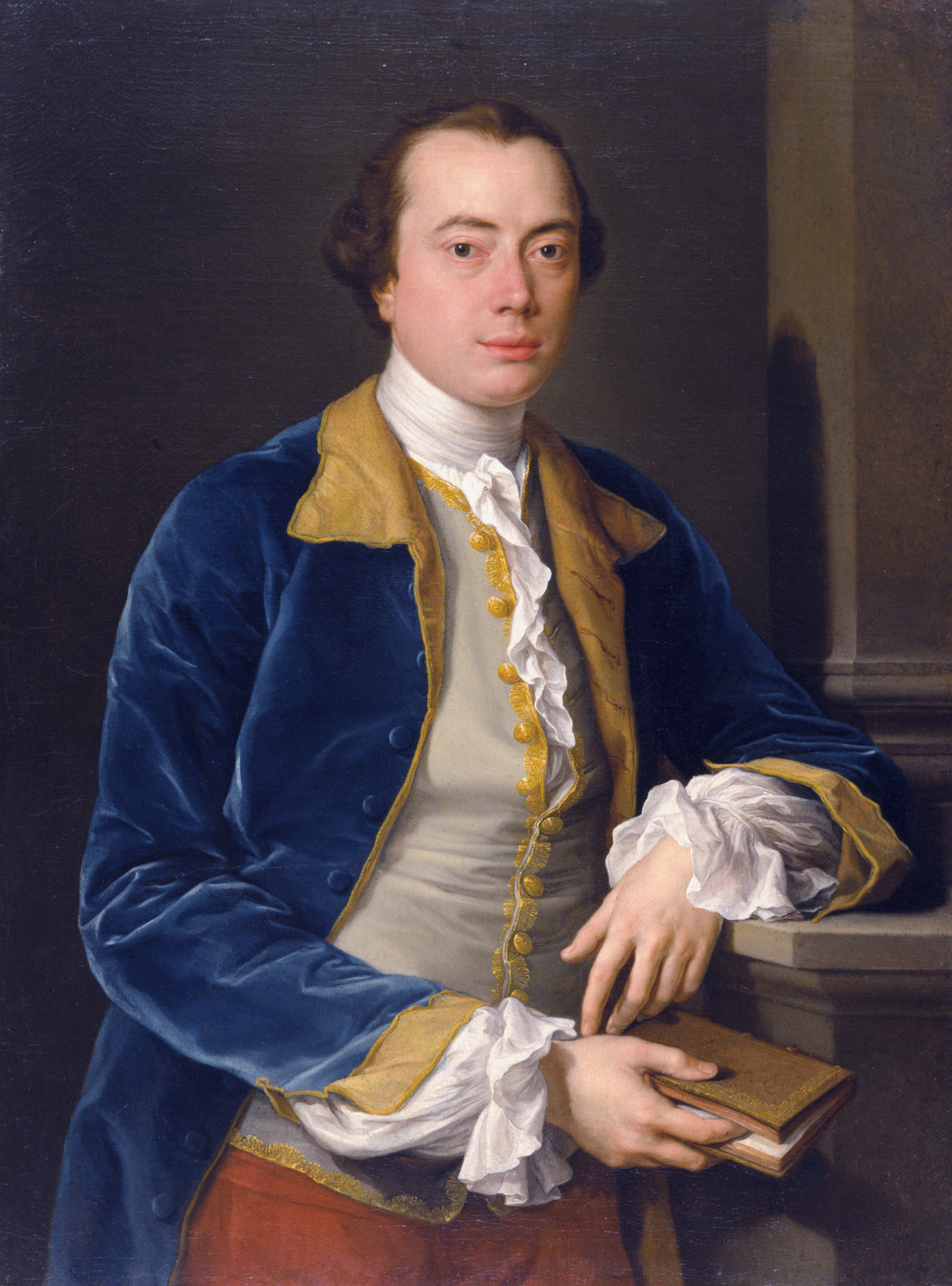
Joseph Henry of Straffan (Pompeo Batoni, ca. 1750–1755)

Hugh Henry who was MP for Limavady 1713 and Antrim 1727–43 built a house which resembled Oakley Park in Celbridge. Another Hugh Henry (a nephew) built Lodge Park in 1775. His son Joseph Henry matriculated from Trinity College at 13, inherited the house in 1749, and became MP for Longford 1761–68, Joseph Henry is featured in many of the caricatures painted by William Hogarth and on display in the National Gallery of Ireland. His son John Joseph Henry gave the site for Straffan Catholic church in 1787. At the request of Valentine Lawless, Henry subscribed £500 for defence of Armagh rebel priest James O'Coigly. In 1801 he married Lady Emily Fitzgerald a daughter of the Duke of Leinster. According to a commentator of the time "owing to his extravagance from one of the richest commoners in Ireland he became so embarrassed that he was obliged to sell Straffan and live abroad. Among other foolish things he built an underground passage from Straffan House to the stables." A Benjamin Hallam design for proposed extension to house from 1808 survives, but the house accidentally burned and the Henry family settled in France.

=== Barton family ===
Hugh Barton, of the wine firm Barton and Guestier, purchased the Straffan estate and built a new house, Straffan House (1828–32, designed by Frederick Darley), slightly downriver from the Henry's burned out home. Twenty years later an attic and a distinctive mansard roof were added, and the stacks raised and embellished in the French style. An Italian style campanile tower with gilded vane was added later. The refurbished house was based on a chateau at Louveciennes.

Hugh Barton (1766–1854) was in turn succeeded by Nathaniel Barton (1799–1867), Hugh Lyndoch Barton (1824–1899), Bertram Francis Barton (1830–1904), Bertram Hugh Barton (1858–1927) and Capt Frederick (Derick) Barton (1900–1993). The first five generations of Bartons owned both the estate at Straffan and the family's 37-hectare vineyard in St Julien near the Gironde north of Bordeaux, producers of Chateau Leoville-Barton and Chateau Langoa-Barton. On his death Bertram Barton left the Straffan estate to his eldest son Derrick and the Bordeaux estate to his second son Ronald Barton. Anthony Barton moved to St Julien in 1951 and took over the vineyard on the death of Ronald in 1986.

== Places of interest ==
Straffan contains Catholic and Church of Ireland churches, a newsagent, two pubs, a Gaelic football club, a soccer club and a primary school (Scoil Bhríde).

There are approximately fifty sites of archaeological and cultural interest in the locality, several of which have been listed for preservation by Kildare County Council, ranging from an ancient hill fort and round tower to the 1913 Lych Gate to the graveyard which has been adopted as the symbol of the village. Local commercial visitor attractions include a Steam Museum at Lodge Park.

=== Castles and houses ===
The site of a tower house at Castledillon passed to the de Hereford and Rochford families (1359). No visible evidence of this tower house remains, with farm buildings now occupying the site. A Wogan family tower house "in the north part of Richardstown townland" described as "a square building about 60 feet (18 m) in height' by Thomas O'Conor in 1837 is now reduced to a pile of stones and mortar which has obviously been moved from its original location.

Barberstown Castle (53°19′21″N 6°36′31″W) remains standing and remains in use as a hotel. It is 50 feet (15 m) at its greatest height with a battlemented keep, walls which are four and a half feet thick, two small towers, a 53 step staircase and some evidence of damage in the war of 1641. Originally built by Nicholas Barby in the 13th century, it passed through several owners before, in the 19th century, Hugh Barton added a new roof and built a Victorian house alongside. It has been used as a hotel since the 1970s.

Lyons Castle is mentioned in the 1332 Book of Howth when it was burned by the O'Tooles. It passed to the Tyrrell in the 13th century, the Aylmer family in 1271 and to the Lawless family, Barons Cloncurry in 1796 after which they built the nearby house. It was substantially rebuilt and refurbished by Valentine Lawless, the second Baron Cloncurry 1803–10.

Lodge Park (53°18′44″N 6°35′52″W) was designed by Nathaniel Clements for Hugh Henry. It is a Palladian house with four wings.

The townland known variously in the calendar Rolls as Surning, Twinings, Surnyng and eventually known as Turnings passed into the ownership of Thomas Hall (1406), William Preston (1508), Patrick Sarsfield (ancestor of Patrick Sarsfield of siege of Limerick fame) (1560), Theophilus Jones (1641) and eventually passed to the Mills family.

Straffan Lodge (53°18′49″N 6°36′53″W), described by Samuel Lewis in 1837 as "the neat residence of Mrs Whitelaw", has a dining room which is decorated in Tudor style with oak panels. Its single storey wing was added later.

== Religion ==
Local ecclesiastical sites prospered at different times. The medieval parish of Straffan lies on the border of the Diocese of Dublin (boundaries established in 1111), to the south of Taghadoe Parish (Teach Tua), bounded on the west by Mainham, south by Bodenstown and Whitechurch, and east by Killadoon and Castledillon. Ecclesiastical sources refer to Straphan Register of the Hospital of St. John the Baptist 1245, the Calendar of Justiciary Rolls 1306 and the Regal Visitation 1530 which describes Straffan as "a church of the deanery of Saltu Salmonis". In 1541, Straffan was united with Castledillon, Donacumper and Kildrought.

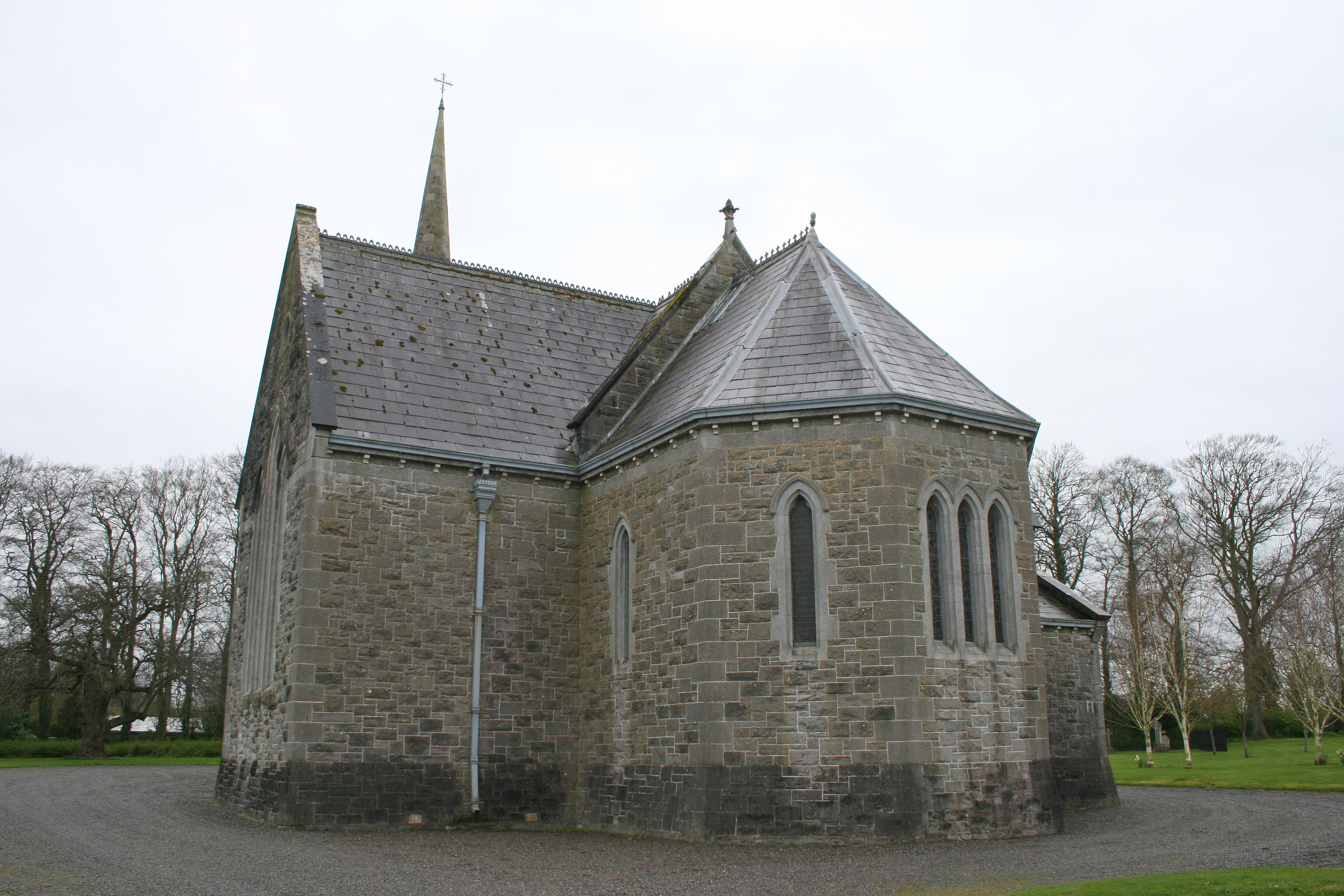
Straffan's Church of Ireland (Anglican) church

The last Catholic parish priest of Castledillon died in 1707 after which the parish was joined with Straffan. Straffan parish is now joined to Celbridge.

Straffan's ruined parish church (St. Patrick's Church) in the graveyard at the centre of the village can be dated to the 15th century from its distinctive bell cote, and defensive living quarters over the main building in the manner of Oughter Ard and other local churches. Straffan Church of Ireland parish church (1833) has stained glass windows by Alfred Child and Catherine O'Brien and several monuments to the Barton family. It was modelled on churches in France. St. Brigid's Catholic church (1787, rebuilt 1987) was also the site of the national school until 1963.

A well and stone roofed chapel at Ardrass (restored 1898) are associated with St Patrick. The hill was a place of pilgrimage until the 19th century.

Castledillon, on the south bank of the River Liffey opposite Straffan, is an ancient monastic site which was founded by Iollathan of the desert (feast day listed as 2 February in the Martyrology of Tallaght) and accorded a genealogy which indicated close kinship with the Uí Dúnlainge kings of Leinster. By 1294, the church of Tristeyldelane was described as "not worth the services of chaplains" in the Calendar of Christ Church deeds. The site is now identified by a pile of stones and one headstone, erected in 1758 to the Spellissy family. The Castledillon Friars Stone, probably erected for a 15th-century abbot of St Wolstan's (four miles to the east), remained on the site until removed to the visitor centre in Kildare town.

== Transport ==
=== Straffan rail tragedy ===
Straffan was the scene of a railway accident on 5 October 1853 in which 18 people died including four children. It occurred in heavy fog when a goods train ran into the back of a stalled passenger train at a point 974 yards (891 m) south of Straffan Station. The goods train smashed the first class carriage, which was driven a quarter of a mile through station. The tragedy was the subject of a poem by Donegal-born poet William Allingham. It was the third worst accident in rail history to that date.

Straffan railway station was last used for scheduled services in 1947 and the last special train stopped at Straffan in 1963. Straffan railway station opened on 1 August 1848 and finally closed on 10 November 1947.

=== Straffan Steam Museum ===
The Straffan Steam Museum is housed in a church which once stood in the Inchicore railway works in Dublin. The museum houses a collection of models of steam locomotives, a number of steam engines used for industrial propulsion, a pumping engine employed in Jameson's distillery in Dublin, and a large beam engine installed in Smithwick's brewery, Kilkenny, in 1847. The museum is open to visitors from on certain days during the summer.

== The K Club ==
On the death of Bertram Barton in a hunting accident in 1927, the scale of the losses on the estate, £4,000 per year, became apparent. Derrick Barton laid off most of the staff and demolished part of the house before selling the house and estate for £15,000 to motorcycle manufacturer John Ellis in 1949. Derrick Barton moved to Straffan Glebe House for a time. Straffan House had five private owners in the mid-20th century: car importer Stephen O'Flaherty (1960), film producer Kevin McClory (1973), Iranian air force founder and minister in the Shah's government Nadar Djhanbani (1977, shortly before the downfall of the Shah's government and his execution), developer Patrick Gallagher (1979) and property magnate Alan Ferguson (1981).

Entrepreneur Michael Smurfit, who was searching for a suitable estate to develop as a country club, acquired Straffan House in 1988 (via the Jefferson Smurfit company). Purchased for £7m, a further £35m was spent developing the house as a hotel and golf course. In 1991, Straffan House was opened as a 31-bedroom hotel. In 1990, the north golf course, designed by Arnold Palmer, was completed. Straffan staged the PGA cup in 1991 and Irish professional Championship in 1992. As a result of a £1 million sponsorship offer from Smurfit Kappa, the European Open moved its annual home to Straffan in 1995. The European PGA was staged in the K Club in 2006. The south course was completed in 2003 and used for the 2004 European Open.

In 2002, Madison Dearborm took over Smurfit Kappa and divested itself of the K Club. Michael Smurfit purchased the hotel and estate and acquired a further 80 acres (320,000 m^{2}) on the opposite side of the river for €115m in 2004.

== Sport ==
There is a history of horse breeding and training in the area. For example, The Tetrarch was foaled in the area in 1911 and the 1993 St. Leger Stakes winner, Bob's Return, was bred at the Baronrath stud at Straffan.

Local sportsman Christopher Barton won an Olympic silver medal in 1948 as part of an all-Cambridge eight which represented Britain in the Olympic Games. His father, Derrick Barton, was a member of the British Modern Pentathlon team which finished seventh in the team event at the 1924 Olympics.

Straffan AFC, a local association football (soccer) club, was founded in 1978 and previously played in Whitechurch in Straffan. In 1979, the club reached the Counties Cup semi-final but were beaten. They decided to move to the Dublin section of the Leinster Junior League in 1981 and the club went on to win its first league title in 1981–1982.

The local Gaelic Athletic Association (GAA) club in Straffan GAA. JL Carews played Sallins in their first match on the same day, 15 February 1885, that Maurice Davin's first rules of Gaelic football were being agreed by the GAA Central Council in Cork. Straffan GAA club were successful in the 1966 Intermediate championship, and played in the Kildare senior championship from 1967 until 1979. In 2009, Straffan won the Junior football championship. As of the 21st century, Straffan has two teams competing in the Kildare Senior division 2 and division 4 Football Leagues and at intermediate level in the championship.

The annual Liffey Descent canoe race, (first staged 1960) starts annually in Straffan and follows the River Liffey 17 miles (27 km) downstream to Islandbridge.

In basketball, Anne Marie Cooney was a silver medallist at the 2011 Athens Special Olympics and gold medallist at the 2015 Los Angeles Special Olympics.

== See also ==
- List of towns and villages in Ireland

== Bibliography ==
- Ardclough Churches 1985 Souvenir Brochure.
- Allen, Hilary: Cradle Days and Winning Ways: History of Straffan GAA (Straffan GAA 1986).
- Barton, Derick: Memories of Ninety Years: An Autobiography (Privately published 1985).
- Corry, Eoghan and Tancred, Jim: Annals of Ardclough (Ardclough GAA 2004).
- Fitzgerald, Walter: Castledillon (Kildare Journal Archaeological Society Vol VI 1909 pp 207–213).
- Fitzpatrick, W J: Life, Times and contemporaries of Lord Cloncurry (1855).
- Gilleece, Dermot: The Ryder Cup 2006: Ireland's Legacy (Red Rock Press 14 Oct 2005) ISBN 978-0-9548653-2-0.
- Kelly, Martin J: Owners and tenants of Barberstown Castle (Kildare Journal Archaeological Society 1975).
- Journals of the Kildare Archaeological Society: Volume II : 259, 283. Volume IV : 114. Volume VI : 207–213. Volume XII : 265.
- Lawless, Valentine, Lord Cloncurry: Recollections (Dublin 1849). Archived online version.
- Reid, Philip: The Cup: How the 2006 Ryder Cup Was Won (Maverick House 20 Jan 2007 ISBN 978-1-905379-24-8).
