= Castlewarden, County Kildare =

Castlewarden Caisleán Bhairnín
- Townland
- Location in Ireland
- Coordinates: 53°18′N 6°36′W
- Country: Ireland
- Province: Leinster
- County: County Kildare
- Elevation: 70 m (230 ft)
- Time zone: UTC+0 (WET)
  - Summer (DST): UTC-1 (IST (WEST))

Castlewarden (Irish: Caisleán Bhairnín) is a townland, monastic site and former parish situated between Ardclough and Kill, County Kildare just off the N7 in Ireland. The district is home to a golf club and a riding school today.

== Etymology and history ==
After the Anglo-Norman invasion some time before 1173, Leinster was inherited by Strongbow Richard Fitz Gilbert de Clare "Strongbow", 2nd Earl of Pembroke, through his marriage to Aoife of Leinster, daughter of Diarmait MacMurrough, one of the Kings of Leinster. The name Castlewarden appears to be derived from Warinus, Abbott of St Thomas’ Abbey in 1268 - Castellum Warin (Latin). Adam de Hereford had bestowed the lands on the Abbey of St Thomas, along with Wochtred (Oughter Ard) after being given large territories of land by Strongow. In 1377 John Leche, nephew of Ewa de L’Leche, wife of Hugh de Warin, and physician to Edward III, was grantee by patent of Castle Warin and other lands in Kildare. He was a son of John Leche of Ghattisworth, esq. and Lucy de L’Leche. The church was vacated by the early 17th century. The castle remained in good repair until the 18th century.

== Landmarks ==
Castlewarden House which now forms the main building of Castlewarden Golf Club, a medieval earthwork complex comprising a motte and bailey and a rectangular enclosure, are all listed monuments under the Kildare Development Plan. The earliest evidence of human habitation in the area was the discovery of a flint dated to 4800-3600 BC, at Castlewarden below Oughter Ard Hill, a rare find on a dryland location. Castlewarden hill is an ancient site associated with the 10 Uí Dúnchada kings of Leinster between 750 and 1050, whose inauguration took place on nearby Lyons Hill.

== Calendar and civil paper references ==
Stephen Creman was Vicar of Uachtar Árd and Castlewarden in 1541, when the church chancel was said to be "in need of repair."The church had disappeared by the early 17th century, although the site and that of a holy well can still be identified. The Castle was burned by order of Lords Justices William Parsons and John Borlase in 1641.

== Bibliography ==
- Ardclough Churches 1985 Souvenir Brochure.
- Corry, Eoghan and Tancred, Jim: Annals of Ardclough (Ardclough GAA 2004).
- Journals of the Kildare Archaeological Society: Volume I : 197. Volume IV : 255. Volume VI : 448. Volume XII : 340.
- Margaret Gowen & Co Ltd (Jackie Jordan), Architectural Assessment of Castlewarden Golf Club, 2002
