= Reeves, County Kildare =

Reeves
- Townland
- Location in Ireland
- Coordinates: 53°18′28″N 6°34′01″W
- Country: Ireland
- Province: Leinster
- County: County Kildare
- Elevation: 61 m (200 ft)
- Time zone: UTC+0 (WET)
  - Summer (DST): UTC-1 (IST (WEST))

Reeves is a townland, and tower house situated near Ardclough and Lyons Hill County Kildare, situated on the banks of the River Liffey 20 km upstream from the Irish capital Dublin.

== Etymology and history ==
The name comes from a reference to the river Liffey in Norman-French, Rives. Reeves was a disjoined section of the nearby parish of Clonaghlins situated in the nearby medieval parish of Castledillon.

== Calendar and civil paper references ==
The tower house is in a remarkable state of preservation and is of the classic style represented by tower houses built c1300 on the borders of The Pale, with distinctive architectural features which have become the subject of new research, as yet unpublished (2007). The Castle was burned by order of LJs William Parsons and John Borlase in 1641. It is one of two castles at Tipperstown reported in the census of 1659 as having been burned and reduced in value from £120 to £40.

== Bibliography ==
- Ardclough Churches 1985 Souvenir Brochure.
- Corry, Eoghan and Tancred, Jim: Annals of Ardclough (Ardclough GAA 2004).
- Journals of the Kildare Archaeological Society: Volume XII : 267.
