= Ittigen Castle =

Castle in Ittigen, Bern, Switzerland

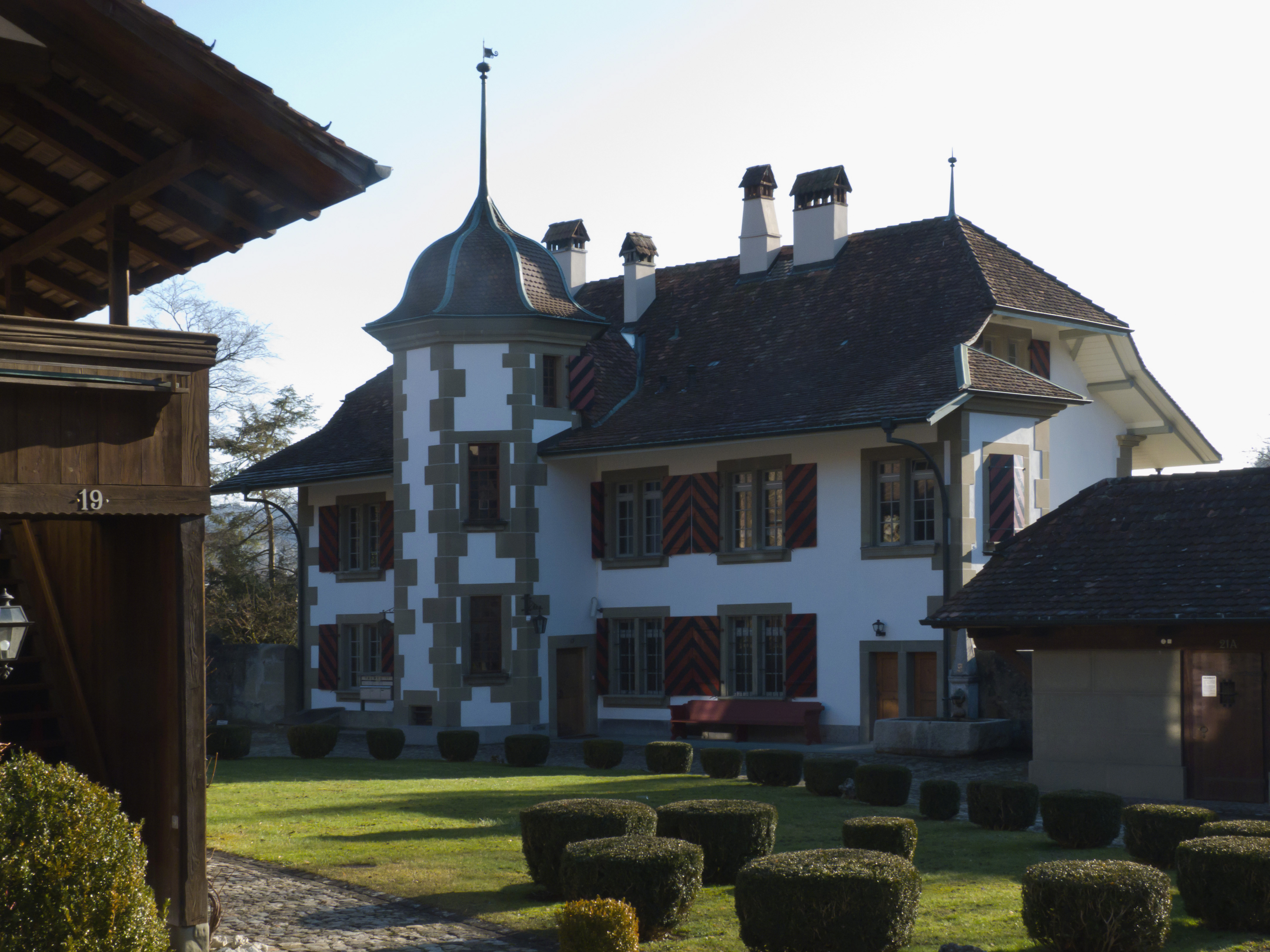
- Campagne Talgut, the mansion with staircase tower

- Location within Switzerland

General information
- Location: Ittigen
- Coordinates: 46.975156°N 7.483704°E
- Completed: 17th century

Ittigen Castle (also Campagne Thalgut or Landsitz Thal) is a historical country house in Ittigen in the Canton of Bern in Switzerland.

== Location ==
During the 17th and 18th centuries numerous Bernese patricians built country estates in Ittigen and surrounding villages. Their proximity to Bern, cleaner air and pleasant climate encouraged construction of estate houses such as Sandhof and Lindenhof in Worblaufen and Thalgut and Mannenberg in Ittigen. Near the old country house is the new Thalgut-shopping center which has replaced the historic Badhaus restaurant and forms a new village center.

== History ==
In 1367 the knight Johann II von Bubenberg, the Lord of Spiez and former Schultheiss of Bern, granted die Matte Thal lands as a fief to the brothers Cuno and Peter von Seedorf. Niklaus Dachselhofer, the Bernese bailiff of Yverdon-les-Bains as well as the Schultheiss of Bern, bought the estate in the late 17th century and enlarged it until his death in 1670. In 1672 a document, now stored in the State Archives of the Canton of Bern, mentioned that his son, also named Niklaus Dachselhofer or Daxelhofer (1634–1707), bought a demesne and manor house in the valley [German: Thal] near the bath house of Peter Rentsch. In 1677 he traded the Thal or Ittigen estates to Samuel Jenner (1624–1699) and received Jenner's estates in Utzigen (now part of Vechigen). His nephew, Samuel Jenner the famed Bernese Baroque architect, renovated and expanded the building to its current appearance.

Under Jenner, the external staircase tower was replaced with an internal staircase and a large living room overlooking the garden. A central corridor was added with richly furnished rooms along both sides. A separate kitchen, stable, farm buildings and a piggery were added.

When Jenner died, the estate passed to his son, Samuel Jenner, in 1699. A few years later, in 1706, it was inherited by Gabriel Frisching. In 1735 Gabriel's son Albrecht Frisching inherited Thalgut. It remained with the Frisching family until 1748 when they exchanged it with Karl Emanuel Jenner. However, he had to sell the estate in 1772 due to financial hardship to Peter and Hans Juker. The Juker brothers paid off the estates debts and two years later Hans became the sole owner. Since then, the estate remained owned by the family. The last tenant farm on the estate closed in 1971 and most of the fields and meadows have been covered with residential and commercial buildings. The estate buildings were extensively restored and modernized over the last century.

== See also ==
- List of castles in Switzerland

== Literature ==
- Hans Gugger: Ittigen, eine junge Gemeinde mit alter Geschichte. Gemeinde Ittigen 1998, ISBN 3-7272-9277-6.
- Wolf Maync: Bernische Wohnschlösser. Ihre Besitzergeschichte. Bern 1980, ISBN 3-7280-5328-7.
- Wolf Maync: Kleine Berner Landsitze. Ihre Besitzergeschichte. Bern 1983, ISBN 3-7280-5361-9.
- Egbert Friedrich von Mülinen: Bericht zur Heimatkunde des Kanton Bern.
- Heinrich Türler und Emanuel Jirka Propper: Das Bürgerhaus im Kanton Bern, II. Teil, Zürich 1922, S. LXVII−LX and Taf. 80.
