= Kilbride, County Waterford =

Civil parish in County Waterford, Ireland

Kilbride (Irish: Cill Bhríde) is a civil parish and townlands in the barony of Middlethird in County Waterford, Ireland. Kilbride is located between Tramore and Waterford. There are two townlands with this name: Kilbride North and Kilbride South.

Kilbride got its name from an old church in Kilbride South (52°11′24″N 7°09′51″W) that was named after St Brigid, possibly Brigit of Kildare, daughter of Dubhtach, whose feast day was 1 February, but associated with her contemporary St Briga, daughter of Congall, whose feast day is 21 January. She is also with Oughter Ard, Ardclough, Straffan, County Kildare and Brideschurch near Sallins. Neighbouring townlands include Monmahouge, Cullencastle, Butlerstown, Knockeen, and Carriglong.

Historical sites in the area include a dolmen in Knockeen, and a stone circle (fairy ring) in Carriglong.
