= Uachtar Ard =

Uachtar Ard (Irish for 'a high place') may refer to two places in Ireland:

- Oughter Ard, ecclesiastical site and townland in County Kildare
- Oughterard, a town in County Galway
