= Mary Redmond =

Artist

- Born: 1863; Nenagh, Ireland
- Died: 16 January 1930 (aged 66–67); Florence, Italy
- Spouse: W Dunn (m. 1893)

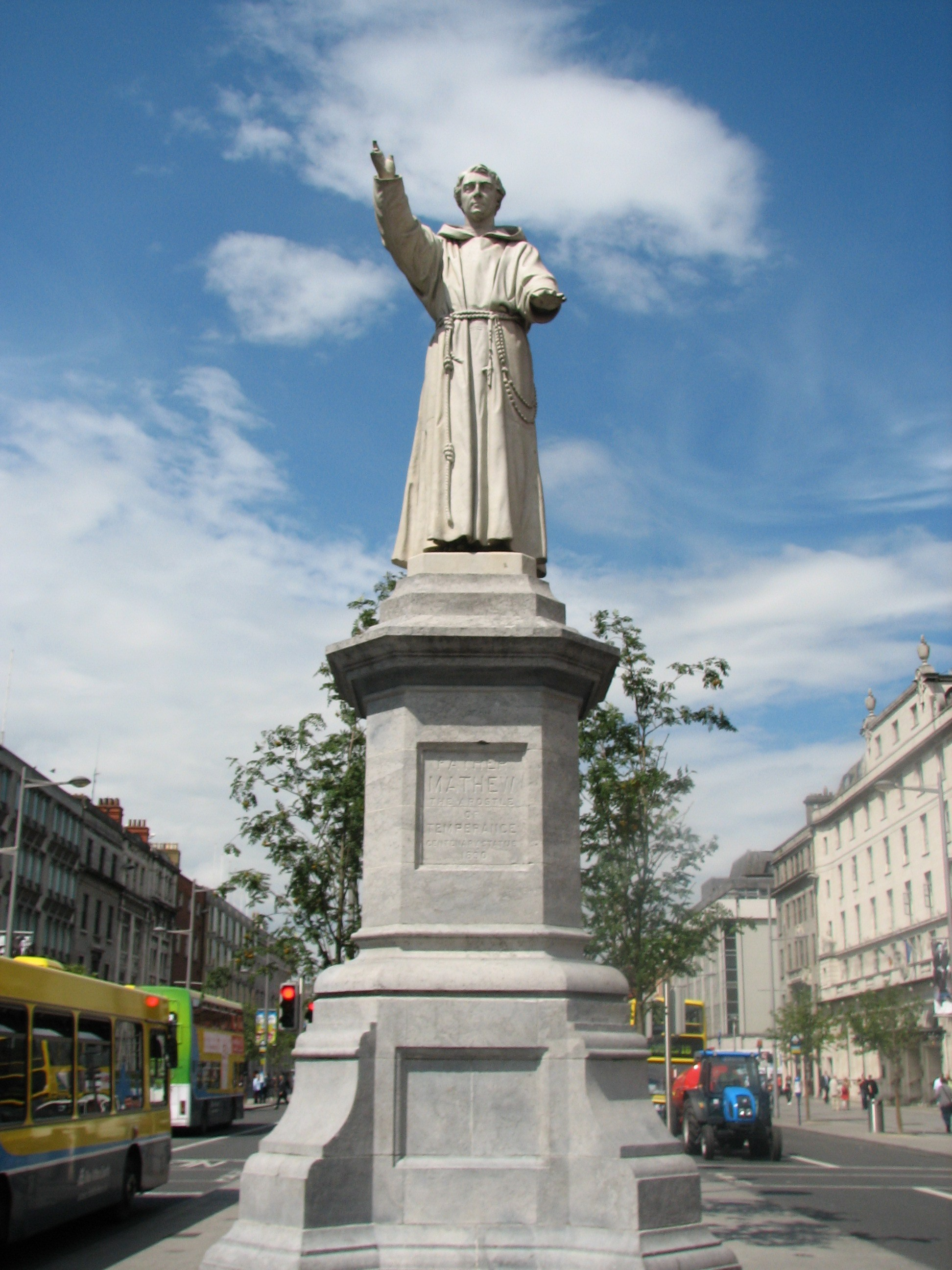
Father Mathew statue

Mary Redmond (1863 – 16 January 1930) was an Irish sculptor born in Nenagh, County Tipperary, in 1863, and raised in Ardclough, County Kildare, where her father went to work in the limestone quarries.

== Early life ==
At school in Ardclough, she modelled the soft clay from a sinkhole near her home into clay figures. At the age of nine she was sent to live in Dublin to attend primary school. While there, she worked in the studio of Thomas Farrell where she created her first work "a hand on a cushion". She was accepted into the Dublin Metropolitan School of Art where she studied drawing and painting, though she was drawn to working with clay.

== Career ==
Her most famous work, a statue of Father Theobald Mathew in O'Connell Street, Dublin, was inaugurated in 1893 (or 1891) (8 February). She won a contest to create the sculpture, an achievement for a woman artist at the time. According to Nora J Murray’s article in Capuchin Annual (1932), the male model for the statue took the concept of being plastered a little too far, was dismissed for drunkenness and was later convicted for vandalising her work.

== Works ==
Among her other works are a bust of Gladstone, modelled at his home, Hawarden Castle, a bust of Edmund Dwyer Gray (of which 30 repeats were made), a presentation shield to Lord Wolseley and a memorial bust of William Martin.

== Later life and death ==
Redmond married Dr W Dunn, from Florence, in London in 1893. They moved to Italy and lived near Galileo's Tower in Florence. She died there on 16 January 1930.
