= Ardclough =

Village in County Kildare, Ireland

Ardclough / Ardclogh Ard Cloch
- Village
- Location in Ireland
- Coordinates: 53°17′53″N 6°34′07″W
- Country: Ireland
- Province: Leinster
- County: County Kildare
- Elevation: 61 m (200 ft)
- Time zone: UTC+0 (WET)
  - Summer (DST): UTC-1 (IST (WEST))

Ardclough, officially Ardclogh (/ɑːrdˈklɒx/; Irish: Ard Cloch, meaning 'high stone'), is a village and community in the parish of Kill, County Kildare, Ireland. It is two miles (3 km) off the N7 national primary road. It is the burial place and probable birthplace of Arthur Guinness, who is said to have returned to the maternal homestead of the Reads at Huttonread to give birth in the tradition of the time.

== Location ==
Ardclough is located below two detached foothills of the Wicklow Mountains, Lyons Hill and Oughterard on some of the most fertile soils in Ireland. The River Liffey passes within a one kilometre radius. The main transport arteries to the south and south west of Ireland pass through, the main railway line to Cork and Tralee, the canal to Shannonbridge, and the N7 which passes nearby.

While the original townland of Ardclough was situated west of the canal in land that is now inaccessible, and contained the site on the opposite bank of the canal of the original (1810) parish church of Lyons and a group of quarries there, the place now referred to Ardclough approximates more closely to the townlands of Tipperstown and Wheatfield, where housing was built in 1876 and 1989. The development of 54 houses on a nearby site was proposed, but has yet to begin. Construction on a new 16-classroom national school began near the original site of Tipperstown House in January 2011. A new graveyard is also planned on a site south east of the current centre of the village.

== Geology ==
The soil is principally a rich loam, varying from 10 to 16 inches (410 mm) in depth, and resting on a hard and compact substratum of floetz limestone. The water table is unusually high. The low group of nearby hills, which includes Lyons and Oughterard in County Kildare and Windmill Hill, Athgoe, and Rusty Hill in County Dublin, are composed of clay-slate, grauwacke, grauwaeke-slate, and granite. The grauwacke consists of small and finely rounded and angular grains of quartz, numerous minute scales of mica, small fragments of clay-slate, and sometimes portions of felspar. The grauwacke consists of small and finely rounded and angular grains of quartz, numerous minute scales of mica, small fragments of clay-slate, and sometimes portions of felspar and red sandstone.

== Etymology ==
The name was first recorded as 'Aclagh' on Alexander Taylor's 1783 map. It was the site of the masshouse (later old Ardclough church), school and the three largest of seven local quarries, on the opposite bank of the canal. From 1837 onward it was recorded as 'Ardclogh' and later 'Ardclough'. The name likely comes from Ard Cloch, meaning "high stone or stone building".

== Habitat ==
The area provides a combination of hill, wood and water habitats. More than 35 species of birds have been identified and coarse fishing for pike, perch, roach and rudd is common along the canal bank.

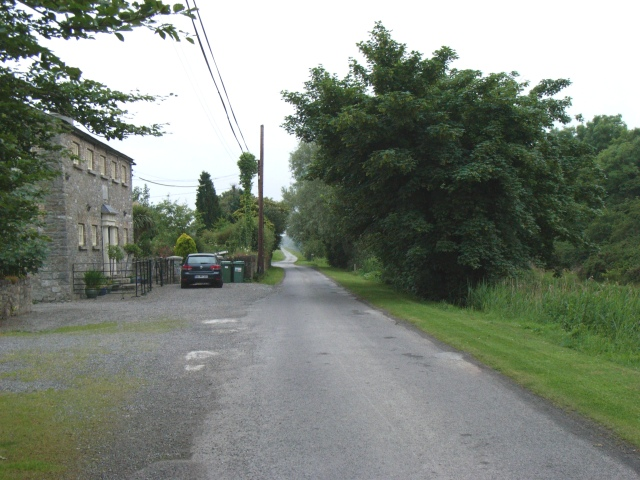
Grand Canal Towpath at Ardclough, County Kildare

== Amenities ==
Amongst the settlement's buildings today are a national school, a church, Ardclough GAA Club, and one shop "Buggys". Ardclough also contains the historic round tower at Oughterard.

== History ==
=== Royal site ===
The earliest evidence of human habitation at Ardclough was the discovery of a flint dated to 4800–3600BC, at Castlewarden below Oughter Ard Hill, rare for a dry-land location from the time. Lyons Hill was the inauguration site and base for 10 Uí Dúnchada kings of Leinster. The Battle of Glen Mama, where Brian Boru defeated Máel Mórda king of Leinster and Sitric Silkbeard King of Dublin in 999, is believed to have taken place on the Dublin side of Oughterard Hill. The area was accorded its own place-legend in the Dindsenchas, Liamuin. Lyons subsequently became home to the Aylmer, Tyrrell and Lawless families.

=== Historic buildings ===
There are five medieval churches and three castles in the area. Most important is Oughter Ard, a seventh-century monastery associated with saints Briga (feast day 21 January) and Derchairthinn (feast day 8 March) and site of a round tower. Recent research has estimated that the ruined church there dates to 1350, not 1609 as previously believed. It was the site of a Royal Manor. Whitechurch, (Ecclesia Alba, named for the Carmelite order) was granted in 1320, and enfifed in 1508. A single headstone is the only reminder of the church of Castledillon, (1000), once a parish of its own. The graveyard beside another disappeared church at Clonaghlis, (pre 1206) is still in use and is associated with female saints Fedhlim and Mughain. Castlewarden (c1200) church has disappeared. Reeves Castle, on the Celbridge road, was built in the 14th century.

A mass house built below Oughter Ard hill in 1714 became the site of the first modern Catholic church in 1810 and a school in 1839. Lyons parish was united with Oughterard in 1541 and with Kill in 1693. The centre of the parish moved to Kill in 1823. The former Lyons parish church (built 1810, refurbished 1896) was deconsecrated in 1985 and is now a private house. It was replaced by a new church in Tipperstown, designed by Paul O'Daly. A marble font, brought from Rome by Valentine Lawless and presented to the church, was removed to Lyons House for safekeeping but remains the property of the parish.

A well-preserved moated site at Puddlehall dates to the 13th century and was cited by University College Dublin Professor Sean O Riordain as one of the finest examples of a moated house in Ireland. Lyons, Reeves and Oughter Ard tower houses date to the 14th century. The large houses of Bishopscourt (constructed 1790) and Lyons (constructed 1804-10) provided an economic focus of the community in the 19th century, as did the Grand Canal (reached Ardclough 1763) in the vicinity of the 13th lock.

=== Grand canal ===
When work on the Grand Canal began in 1756 Ardclough's was one of the first sections to be dug. The canal reached Ardclough in 1763, when the 13th lock, a 137 feet (42 m) double lock built with Pozzuolona mortar, was opened, following the ambitious design of the canal's original engineer, Thomas Omer. After Omer's plans proved too expensive a new engineer, John Trail, took over construction of the canal in 1768, the proposed canal capacity was reduced from 170 ton barges to 40 ton barges. Canal records show that " Lyons or Clonaughles lock" was reduced in size in 1783, but the canal through the thirteenth lock serves as a reminder of Omer's original plan, 20 feet (6.1 m) wide, compared with the 14 feet (4.3 m) width adopted by Trail.

Ardclough Bridge was named in original plans for the Bruton family of Clonaghlis but constructed with a name plate bearing the name of the Henry family of Straffan. From 1777 a local river, the Morrel was proposed as water feeder for the canal, construction resumed and the first passenger boats were towed to Sallins in February 1779.

Local landowner The 2nd Baron Cloncurry was a canal enthusiast, constructing the Lyons mill and lockyard village complex in the 1820s and serving as chairman of the Grand Canal Company five times during his lifetime. The canal was an important, if slow, passenger thoroughfare feeding passenger's to John Barry's hotel at Lyons. When in 1834 Flyboats increased the average speed for passenger boats from 3 mph (4.8 km/h) to 9 mph (14 km/h) Ireland's first railway was already under construction.

The canal peaked at 120,615 passengers in 1846, the year construction started on the Dublin-Cork railway line. When a Dublin-Galway railway line was opened in 1850 the closure of the rarely profitable passenger service followed in 1852. Cargo traffic continued to use the canal for another 108 years, peaking at 379.045 tons in 1865 when an average of 90 barges a day passed through Ardclough. The canal was motorised 1911–24 and closed to cargo in 1960, but is still a thoroughfare for leisure boats. The tracks of the ropes of the horse-drawn barges can still be traced at Ardclough canal bridge. A folk belief prevailed that the canal was haunted at the thirteenth lock because it had been dug through a graveyard, a possible reference to nearby Clonaghlis graveyard.

=== Notable events ===
Historical population
Year	Pop.	±%
1841	90	—
1851	78	−13.3%
1861	54	−30.8%
1871	73	+35.2%
1881	75	+2.7%
1891	21	−72.0%
1901	6	−71.4%
1911	9	+50.0%

The Great Southern & Western Railway (constructed 1844) and Straffan railway station (used until 1947) opened communications to Dublin for cattle and horse dealers. A railway accident on 5 October 1853, the third-worst in Irish rail history, killed 18 people including four children in the townland of Clownings. It occurred in heavy fog when a goods train ran into the back of a stalled passenger train at a point 974 yards south of the former Straffan Station. The goods train smashed the first-class carriage, which was driven a quarter of a mile through station. The tragedy was the subject of a poem by Donegal-born poet William Allingham. It was the third worst accident in rail history to that date.

In the Ardclough Sedition Case in October 1917, Nora J Murray, a nationalist poet and writer, the headmistress of Ardclough National School was accused by local Irish Unionist Bertram Hugh Barton of 'sedition in time of war' under the Defence of the Realm Act. He complained about her teaching of Irish history, illegal at the time. in a complaint made in the name of one of Barton's tenants, Kathleen Bourke, an activist in the Women's Unionist Association. After a local defence fund was mounted by the INTO and the local community, the charged was not pursued by the Dublin Castle regime but Murray she was forced out of the area and the house where she lodged was later burned by the British Army.

The Barnewell homestead at Lyons was the headquarters of anti-treaty forces in north Kildare during the Irish Civil War. On 22 June 1975 Whitechurch resident Christy Phelan was killed when he engaged a group of men planting a bomb on the railway line near Baronrath. The bomb was designed to derail the train headed for the Republican Wolfe Tone commemoration at Bodenstown. His selfless intervention prevented greater loss of life. This is one of a number of British undercover operations carried out against civilian targets in the Republic during the Troubles, currently under investigation by the Barron Commission.

The biggest train robbery to date in the history of Ireland took place at Kearneystown on 31 March 1976 when £150,000 was taken from the Dublin-Cork mail train.

Daniel O’Connell (1775–1847) fought a duel with John d’Esterre at Oughterard on 1 February 1815.

=== Economy ===
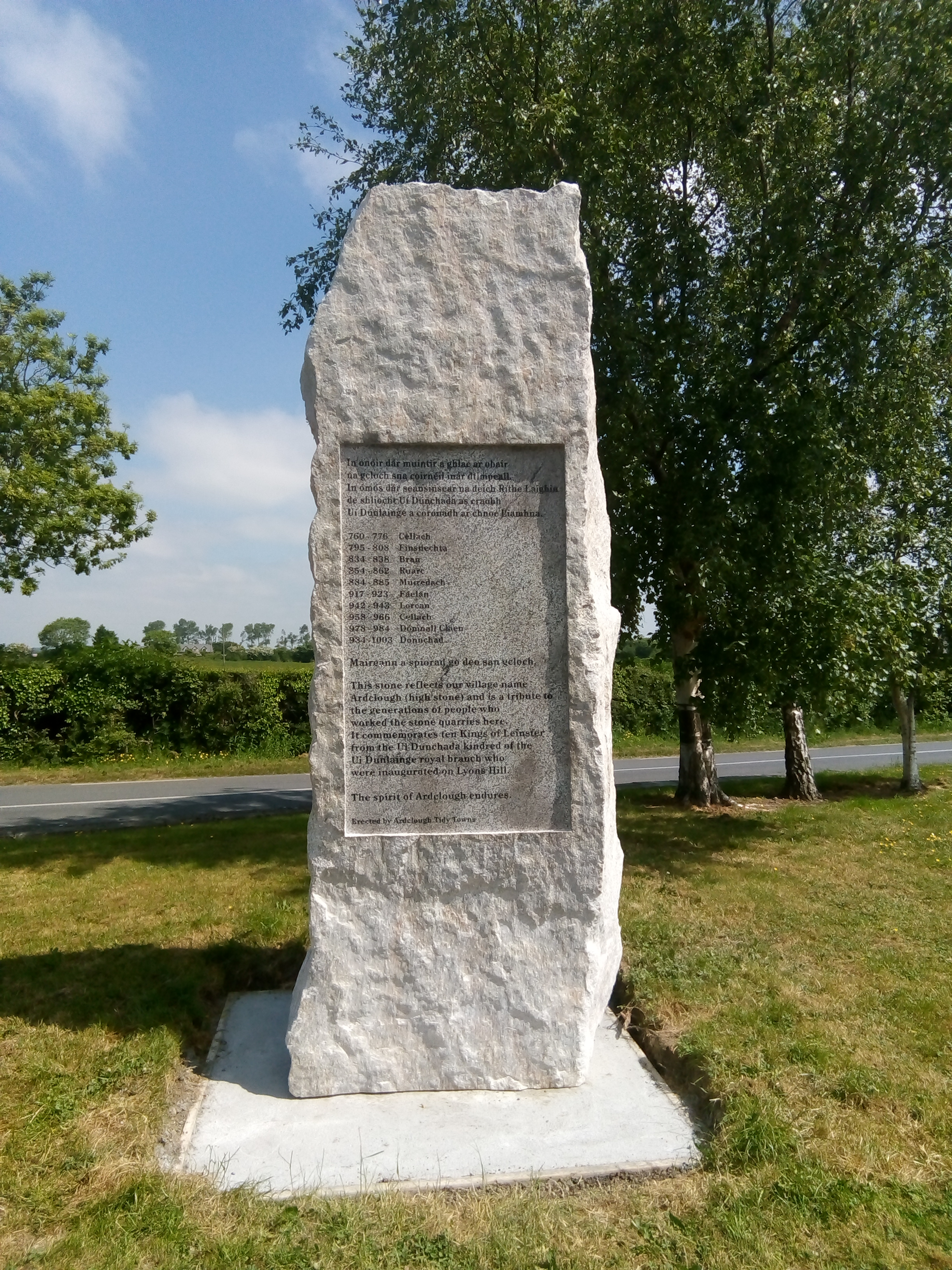
A memorial stone that commemorates the workers of local quarries and also the inauguration site at nearby Lyon's Hill.

Limestone quarries (sinkhole recorded 1804) made Ardclough townland, which is located on a canal bank, the focus of economic activity from the 1800s until the death of owner Patrick Sullivan in 1879 (peak activity 1850s). This townland was also chosen as the location for Lyons parish church (1811) and St Anne's National School (1834). Boston Lime Company reduced the price to six shillings per load in 1875 but a footnote in the 1891 census returns attributes the decline in population from 75 to 21 in Ardclough townland to the closure of quarries. Stone was brought by light railway to the nearby quays and by canal barge to Sullivan's lime kiln. Ardclough limestone was used in the construction of Naas jail and hospital. The census reports of the mid-19th century indicate how the small townland of Ardclough came to give its name to the adjoining district, but by 1901 there were only six people living there.

A cluster of warehouses and workshops at Lyons lockyard village was largely constructed in the 1820s, featuring a mill (leased to William Palmer 1839 and Joseph Shackleton, second cousin of Antarctic explorer Ernest Shackleton, 1853, converted to roller mill 1887), hotel (leased by Patrick Barry 1840-60), police station (active 1820-73 ) and boatyard. This complex employed over 100 people at their peak but declined when the focus shifted away from the canal, the decline in fortunes of the Lawless family and most dramatically as a consequence of the accidental burning of the mill in 1903. In September 2006 the buildings were restored as themed residences and a restaurant.

=== Ardclough Relocates ===
When the GAA club (1936), community hall (1940, reconstructed 2004) and school (1950) were built on a crossroads beneath Henry Bridge, and it shifted the focus of the community to a site in Tipperstown, which is regarded as the modern Ardclough. The population was boosted by houses built at Wheatfield (1940), Boston Hill (1949–51) and Tipperstown (Wheatfield Estate 1976, Lishandra Estate 1989). St. Anne's Church, a Catholic church designed by Paul O’Daly was sited nearby in 1985.

== Sport ==
=== GAA ===
Ardclough GAA (community associated with Hazlehatch Irish Harpers 1887-8, active as Ardclough 1924-5, refounded 1936) is the smallest community to win a Kildare County Senior Football Championship, defeating an Army team that featured All Ireland and inter-provincial players in the replayed final of 1949. The hurling club was founded in 1948. One of the most successful in Kildare, it has won 13 Kildare County Senior Hurling Championships - in 1968, 1973, 1975, 1976, 1979, 1980, 1981, 1982, 1983, 1985, 2004, 2006 and 2017. In 2006 they went on to become Leinster Intermediate club champions, losing to the eventual All Ireland champions in extra time in the quarter-final, and were awarded Kildare GAA club of the year. The 2008 Kildare senior hurling panel included six Ardclough players.

Ardclough Camogie club (founded 1962 by Mick Houlihan, revived 1983 by Phyllis Finneran) won a Kildare senior championship in 1968. Bridget Cushen was selected on the Kildare camogie team of the century.

=== Equestrianism ===
Notable Ardclough horses in both flat and national hunt (once described as "the four horses of the Ardcloughalypse") include The Tetrarch (1911, regarded as probably the finest two-year-old in Irish racing history), Captain Christy (winner Cheltenham Gold Cup, 1974), Star Appeal (winner of the Prix de l'Arc de Triomphe, 1975) and Kicking King (winner Cheltenham Gold Cup, 2005). Father-and-son horse trainers Pat Taaffe and Tom Taaffe came from Alasty. As a jockey Pat Taaffe (1930–92) rode two winners of the English Grand National, Quare Times in 1955 and Gay Trip in 1970 and was Irish National Hunt champion six times.

=== Other sports ===
David Ritchie who lived at Oughterard laid out Ireland's first golf course. Ardclough had a soccer club briefly in 1941-3. Basil Phipps launched his motorcycle racing career in 1947 and hosted a number of racing events at his home in Clonaghlis. Fionn Carr was top try-scorer for Connacht during the Magners League 2008/09 campaign and later signed for Leinster.

== Clubs ==
Ardclough had a brass band which performed at Bodenstown in 1914 and at the 1949 Kildare County Senior Football final. There was a branch of the LDF/FCA (8 November 1941), Fianna Fáil (1931), Labour (1943), Fine Gael (1943) and Macra na Feirme (1955). There are active branches of the Irish Countrywomen's Association (active 1941-42 and revived 1974, with Maura Costello (1924-2011) as Chairwoman) and Comhaltas Ceoltóirí Éireann (branch established in 1966 with Paddy Corry (1916-1971) as Chairman).

== People ==
=== Lived in Ardclough ===
- Gerald Aylmer (c1500-1559), judge and enforcer for English King Henry VIII in Ireland at the time of the Dissolution of the Monasteries,
- Valentine Lawless, 2nd Baron Cloncurry (1773-1853), a local landlord and member of the United Irishmen who helped finance both the 1798 and 1803 rebellions.
- Baron Cloncurry (1840-1928), local landlord and Unionist and Conservative politician who served as High Sheriff of Kildare in 1867.
- Ronan Keating (b.1977), lead singer with Boyzone, lived in Ardclough when he was growing up.
- Nora J Murray (1888–1955), Carrick-on-Shannon born poet, author of "A Wind Upon the Heath" (1918), school teacher at Ardclough and subject of a notorious "sedition in the classroom" case in November 1917 when a local landlord complained about her teaching of Irish history.
- James Butler, 4th Earl of Ormond (1393–1452), popularly known as 'the White Earl'. Lord Ormond, an Anglo-Irish nobleman, was granted Castlewarden and Oughterard in 1412 for supporting the Lancastrian cause.
- Brabazon Ponsonby (1679–1758), founder of one of the most powerful political dynasties of the 18th century. Ponsonby descendants include Sir Alec Douglas-Home (British Prime Minister from 1963-4) and The Duke of Cambridge, heir to the British throne.
- John Ponsonby (1713–1789) of Bishopscourt, speaker of the Irish House of Commons (1756–1769)
- William Ponsonby, 1st Baron Ponsonby (1744–1806), leader of the Irish Whigs (1789–1803).
- George Ponsonby (1755–1817), first counsel to the revenue commissioners.
- Tony Ryan (1936–2007), aviator, founder of Ryanair and Guinness Peat Aviation and patron of the arts purchased a home in Lyons some years before his death.
- Lydia Shackleton (1828–1914), botanical artist, lived in Ardclough between April 1853 when she moved to the family's newly acquired mill at Lyons, where she was housekeeper for her elder brother Joseph, until 1860.

=== Born in Ardclough ===
- Emily Lawless (1845–1913), writer and granddaughter of Valentine Lawless, 2nd Baron Cloncurry born in Lyons.
- Charlie McCreevy (b.1948), Minister for Finance in the Government of Ireland (1997–2004) and European Commissioner for the Internal Market and Services (2004-2010) grew up on the Grand Canal in the lock house at 14th lock and played under-age hurling and football for Ardclough.
- George Ponsonby (1755–1817), opposition leader in the British House of Commons at Westminster and leader of the Whig Party (1808–1817), born in Bishopscourt he lived in Newlands in a house formerly owned by Arthur Wolfe.
- Mary Ponsonby, wife of Charles Grey, British Prime Minister from 1830 to 1834 and best known nowadays as the Earl Grey of the tea brand.
- William Ponsonby (1772–1815), Major-General whose inept charge at the Battle of Waterloo resulted in his death at the hands of the Polish Lancers and was studied as an example of failed battle strategy for generations afterwards,
- Mary Redmond (1863–1930) sculptor responsible for the statue of Father Matthew on O’Connell Street Dublin was born in Ardclough and spent her childhood at the Canal Bank where her father was a quarry manager.

=== Buried in Ardclough ===
- John Philpot Curran (1750–1817), lawyer, patriot and friend of Valentine Lawless, had his body deposited temporarily in the mausoleum at Lyons before being removed to a grave at Glasnevin, where it now reposes.
- Arthur Guinness (1725–1803), founder of the famous brewery is buried in Oughterard cemetery. He was the son of Richard Guinness and Elizabeth Read (1698–1742) from Bishopscourt, who was agent and receiver of Dr Arthur Price and lived in Celbridge at the time of Arthur's birth.
- Arthur Wolfe, 1st Viscount Kilwarden (1739–1803), first Viscount Kilwarden, judge and most famous victim of the rebellion of Robert Emmet is buried in the family vault of the Wolfes in Oughterard cemetery.

== Bibliography ==
- Eoghan Corry and Jim Tancred (2004): Annals of Ardclough
- Ardclough Churches 1985 Souvenir Brochure.
- W J Fitzpatrick: Life, Times and Contemporaries of Lord Cloncurry (1855). (Online version available)
- Valentine Lawless, Personal recollections of the life and times, with extracts from the correspondence of Valentine Lord Cloncurry, Dublin: J. McGlashan; London: W.S. Orr, 1849. ()
- Lyons House: A Guide (2001).
- "Irish Geography" Vol 18 1985 DN Hall M Hennessy and Tadhg O'Keefe Medieval Agriculture and Settlement in Castlewarden and Oughterard pp16–25
- "Kildare Archaeological Society Journal". Volume I: pp84–86, 195, 296, 297, 298, 299. Volume II: pp179, 183, 395. Volume III: pp361, 364, 456. Volume IV: pp64, 165, 179-183, 255, 257. Volume XII: pp264, 332, 339-341, 400, 429.
