= Ardclough Sedition Case =

Ardclough Sedition Case was a complaint and threat of prosecution leveled against “Nora J Murray” (1888–1955), an Irish poet and school teacher, during the revolutionary period.

== Complaint ==
Ms Murray’s teaching of history in Ardclough National School was the subject of a complaint from local Unionist landlord Bertram Hugh Barton (1858–1927) in 1916.

Late in 1917 these allegations reappeared in the form of a complaint about “seditious teaching” filed to the National School commissioners in the name of Mrs Bourke, who said that her child had been discriminated against because he was the son of a British soldier.

Mrs Bourke informed the Commissioners that the teacher “instructs the children always to hate the British and tells them when they grow up she hopes they will fight and die for an Irish Republic,” phrases uncannily similar to the complaints used by Bertram Barton.

She alleged that Ms Murray taught children the nationalist poetry written by Emily Lawless (1845–1913) who had been born in nearby Lyons and who was a granddaughter of United Irish leader Valentine Lawless 2nd baron Cloncurry (1773–1853). She also alleged that Ms Murray had allowed songs composed by Thomas Davis and Peadar Kearney to be sung in class. Influences of all three writers can be found in Murray’s own poetry.

== Response ==
In October 1917 the Commissioners notified the manager of the school, John Donovan that the complaint had been received. He responded that, contrary to Mrs Bourke's accusations, that there had been no instances of seditious teaching in the history class, which had focused mainly on the Norman period, that the charge of victimisation of Bourke’s child was “absolutely false” and that the numbers attending the school had not, as alleged, fallen as a consequence of a loss of confidence in Miss Murray.

Fr Donovan referred to “the celebrated tongue” Mrs Bourke had in the neighbourhood.” He claimed that the teacher was both efficient and popular, and that any songs that may have been sung in class were so widely known that “no-one attaches any significance to them.”

== Enquiry ==
A sworn enquiry organised by Commissioners was postponed, pending a prosecution for sedition by the Dublin Castle administration in Ireland. A defence fund was organised by local people and after considerable publicity no sedition proceedings were initiated.

The only demand on Miss Murray from the Commissioners was that she was required in future to submit all songs to be sung in class for prior approval. Mrs Bourke’s children moved to a Protestant school run under the patronage of Barton in Straffan demesne.

== Significance ==
The case was regarded as a turning point in the battle between the Colonial authorities and the Irish National Teachers Organisation and school managers for freedom of expression in the Irish classrooms at a time when teachers were instructed to force children to recite poems such as “a happy English child.”
