= St. Anne's Church, Ardclough =

- Teampall Áine, Ard Cloch
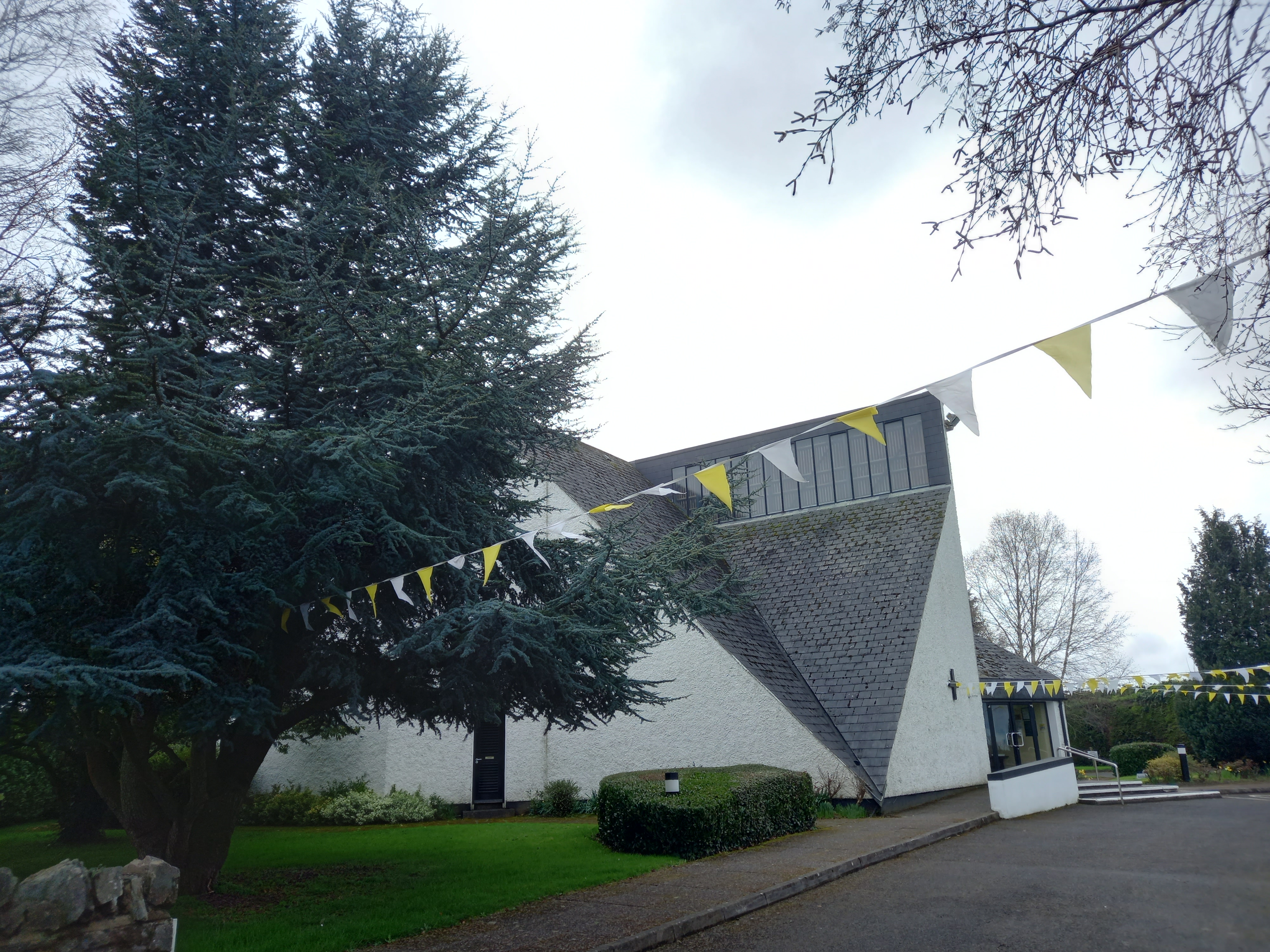

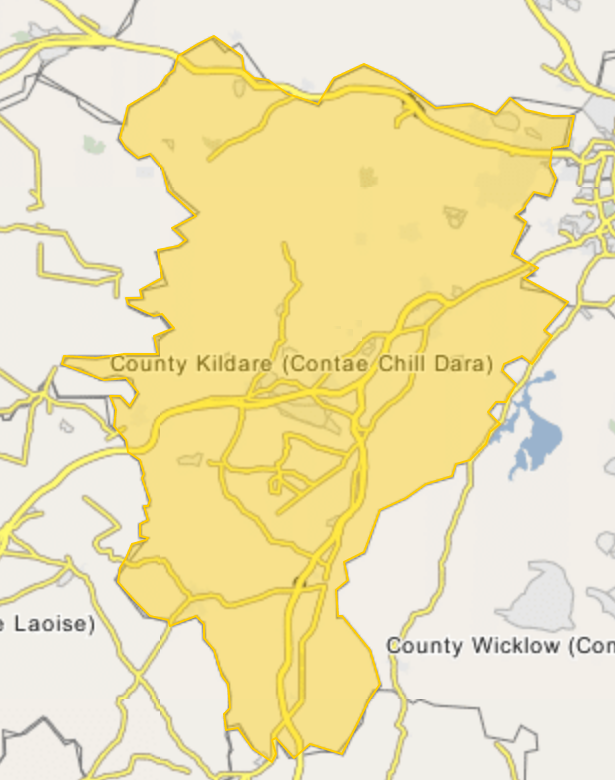
- Location within County Kildare
- 53°17′52″N 6°34′12″W
- Location: Ardclough, County Kildare
- Country: Ireland
- Denomination: Catholic
- Churchmanship: Roman Rite
- Website: killparish.ie

History
- Dedication: Saint Anne
- Dedicated: 19 May 1985

Architecture
- Functional status: active
- Architect(s): Paul O'Daly and Associates
- Style: Modern
- Years built: 1980s

Specifications
- Materials: limestone, slate, cast iron, stained glass

Administration
- Diocese: Kildare and Leighlin
- Deanery: North Deanery
- Parish: Kill, Ardclough & Johnstown

Saint Anne's Church is a 20th-century Catholic church in Ardclough, Ireland.

== Location ==
St. Anne's Church is located in the west end of Ardclough village, about 300 m (330 yd) northwest of the Grand Canal.

== History ==
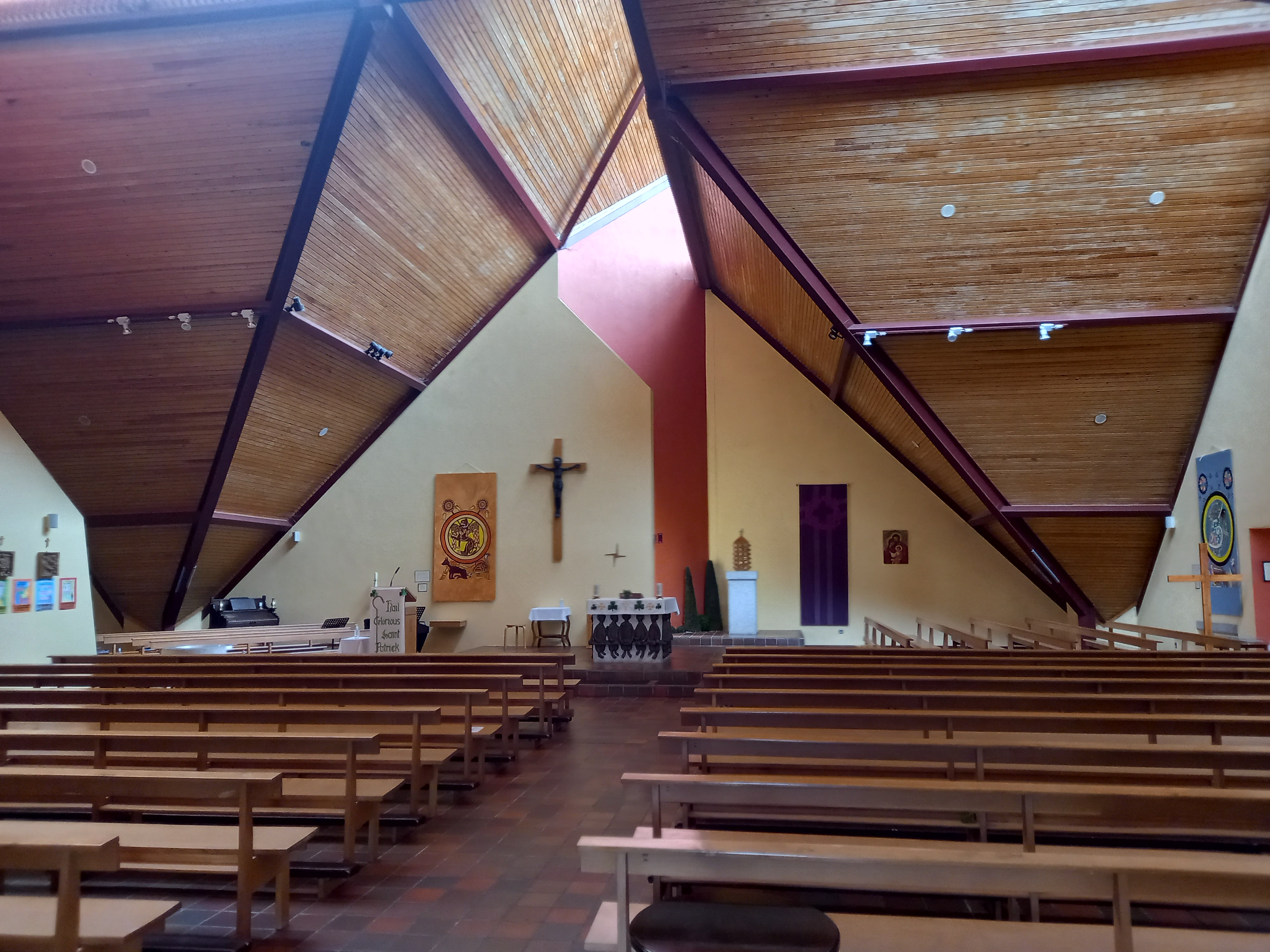
Interior

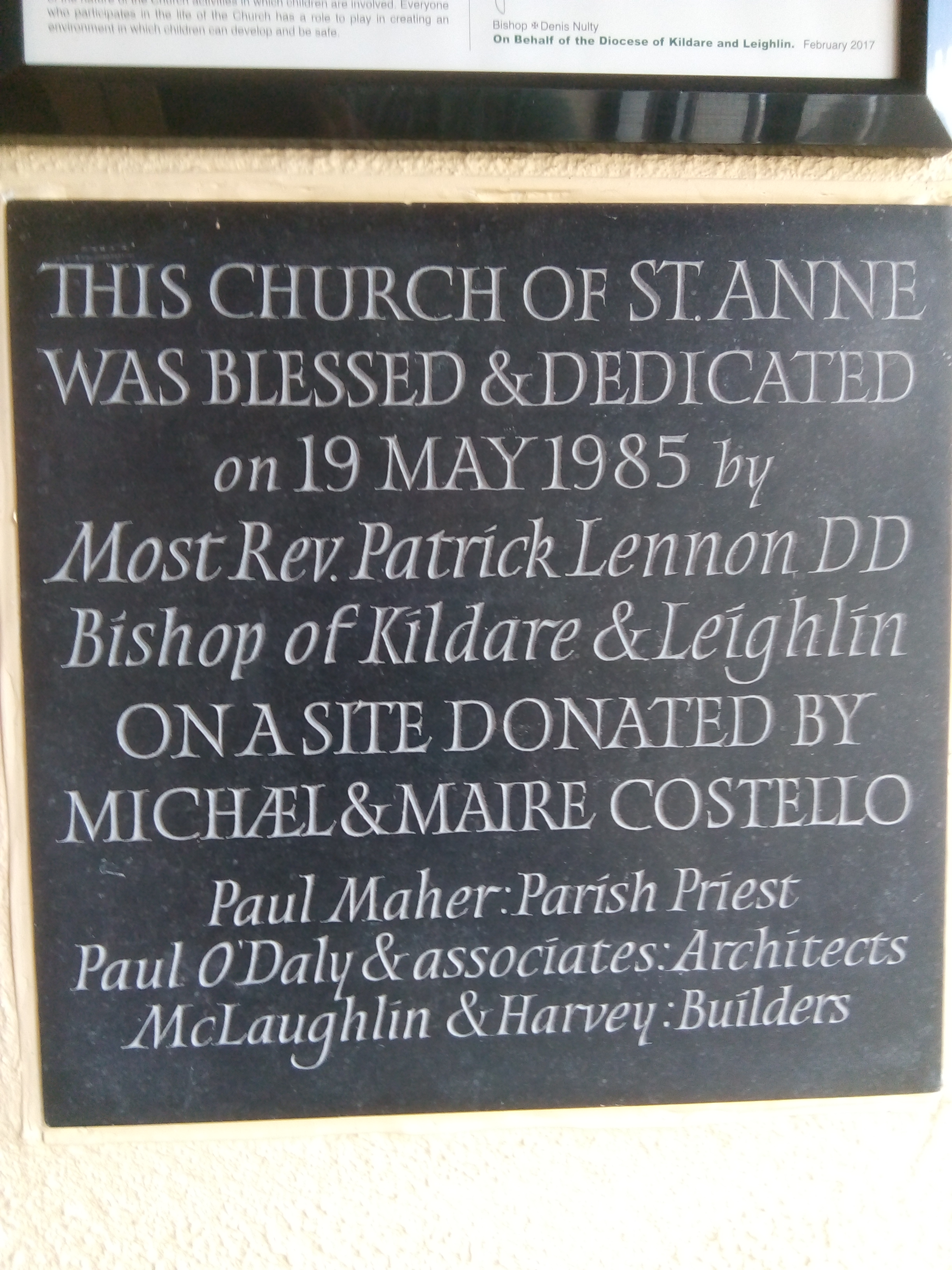
Dedication plaque

A Catholic chapel was built in 1810 by Valentine Lawless, 2nd Baron Cloncurry, on a site donated by him.

The current church was built in 1985 on land donated by Michael and Máire Costello. It was dedicated in 1985 by Patrick Lennon, Catholic Bishop of Kildare and Leighlin.

== Building ==
St. Anne's Church is a square modern church.
