= Reeves Castle =

- Caisleán an Rú (Irish)
- Location within Ireland
- 53.306864°N 6.563530°W
- Type: Tower house
- Location: Reeves, Celbridge, County Kildare, Ireland

History
- Built: 14th century

Site notes
- Architectural style: Norman

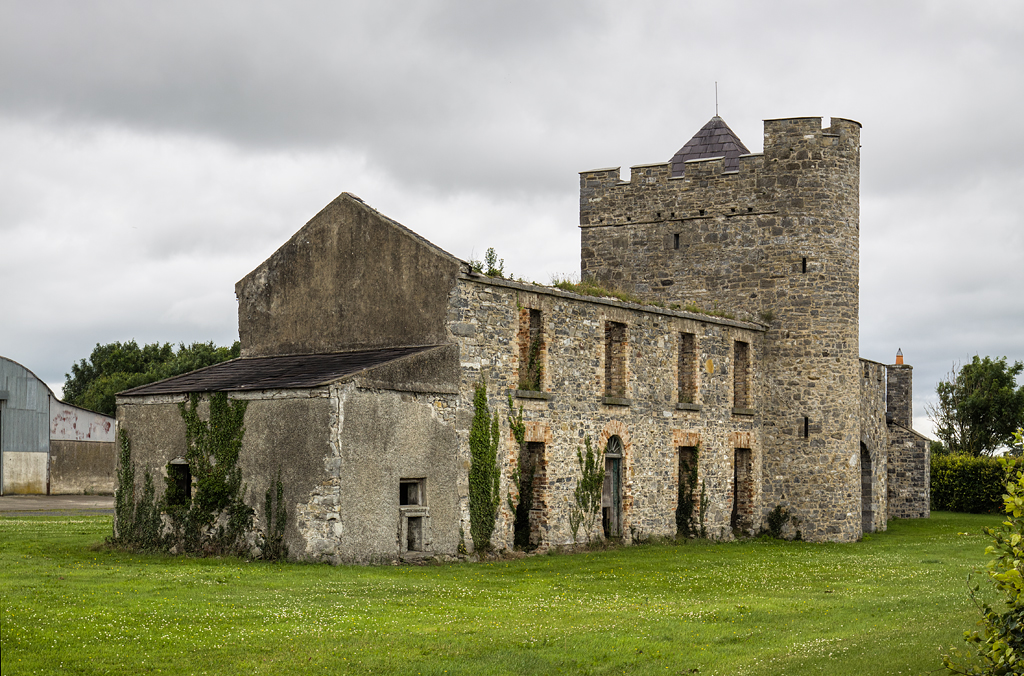
Reeves Castle in 2025

Reeves Castle is a 14th-century tower house (castle) located in County Kildare, Ireland. On the Record of Monuments and Places it bears the codes KD015-001 (enclosure) and KD015-002 (tower house).

== Location ==
Reeves Castle is about 1 km (0.62 mi) north of Ardclough and 4 km (2.5 mi) south-southwest of Celbridge. It is located in countryside 660 m (720 yd) south of a bend in the River Liffey. Lyons Estate is located 1.4 km (0.87 mi) to the southeast.

== History ==
Reeves Castle is believed to derive its name from the Anglo-Norman rive, "riverbank," although other sources connect it to the Old Irish ruibh, "rue." It was built in the 14th century as one of a range of tower houses whose purpose was to defend The Pale from Gaelic Irish raiders.

In the 16th century it was part of the manor of Donaghcumper; in 1537 the manor, along with Reeves Castle was leased to Sir John Alen; the arms of the Alen family were later affixed to Reeves Castle, and they are still to be seen there, now joined to the newer building. In 1537, "le Rew, alias Rewes, and Prioriston" consisted of 1 castle, 3 messuages (dwelling houses with outbuildings), 6 cottages, and 160 acres (65 ha) of land.

The tower house was burned during the Irish Rebellion of 1641, by order of Lord Justice John Borlase, but it was listed as "in good repair" in 1649. It is prominently marked in Alexander Taylor's 1783 map of Co Kildare. In the 18th and 19th centuries it was a property of the Earls of Leitrim.

Today the fortification is located on the grain farm of a Michael McBennett and is not open to the public.

== Building ==
Reeves Castle is four storeys high with a semi-circular stair tower. The original doorway was in the south wall; in the 18th or 19th century a stone farmhouse was built attached to the south wall of the old castle. An archway built onto the north wall may have provided access to a bawn.
