= Derchairthinn =

6th century Irish Saint

Saint Derchairthinn
- Died: ~
- Venerated in: Roman Catholic Church, Eastern Orthodox Church
- Feast: 8 March
- Patronage: Oughter Ard

Saint Derchairthinn or Tarcairteann (fl 6th century) is venerated as a prioress and saint of the monastery of Oughter Ard in Ardclough, County Kildare. Her feast day is 8 March.

She was reputed to be "of the race of Colla Uais, Monarch of Érinn".
