= Saint Bríga =

6th century Irish Saint

Saint Briga
- Died: ~
- Venerated in: Roman Catholic Church Orthodox Church
- Feast: 21 January
- Patronage: Oughter Ard

Saint Bríga (Brigid, Bridget) (fl. 6th century) is venerated as foundress of the monastery of Oughter Ard in Ardclough County Kildare (53°16′40″N 6°33′55″W). Her feast day is 21 January. Bríga is also associated with Brideschurch near Sallins (53°14′36″N 6°41′28″W), and possibly with Kilbride in County Waterford (52°11′24″N 7°09′51″W).

== Life ==
She is described as "Brigid daughter of Congal" in Professor Brian O'Looney's Irish Life of the Saint pages 21 and 22. In the fifth life of Brigid, she is said to have lived in the Leinster province and been "mother or superioress over a monastery and its nuns, who were servants of Christ."

St Brigid was asked to visit another virgin called Briga, and at the house of the latter. Her house was at a place called Kilbrige. Our Saint accepted such an invitation at the time, as she had often done on similar occasions. Arriving at the house, she was received with great joy and honour. According to the usual custom of treating guests, her feet were washed; and after the water had been removed, it cured another nun, whose feet were crippled with gout, almost before her feet could be wiped.

That the friendship continued is alluded to in the Lives of Saint Brigid.

Brigid and Briga were sitting together when the Devil entered. St Brigid saw him, who fixed her eyes steadily on him for a while. She signed the eyes of Briga with the sign of the cross and Briga beheld a deformed monster. Brigid commanded him to speak and make known the purport of his unwelcome visit. The devil replied: "O Holy virgin, I cannot avoid speaking, nor can I disobey your orders, as you observe God’s precepts and are affable to the poor and lowly. He then avowed a desire to cause the spiritual death of a nun, who had yielded to temptations. He even told the name of the nun to the holy abbess, when the latter, charitably calling her, and signing her eyes with a sign of the cross, desired her to behold the monster. The nun was terrified at this sight, and shedding abundance of tears, promised to be more circumspect for the future. Brigid felt great compassion for the penitent, and banished the demon from their presence. Thus, on occasions of her visit, St Brigid procured the corporal restoration of one and the spiritual liberation of another, belonging to the sisterhood.

John Colgan writes in his translation of the sixth life of St Brigid that "in this life the place where these incidents are referred to is not mentioned."

== Namesakes ==
Briga is sometimes confused with Brigit of Kildare daughter of Dubhthach, the famous St Brigid whose feast day was 1 February St Brigid, daughter of Doma, whose feast day was 7 February or the earlier St Brigid, daughter of Neman, also associated with Kildare and said to have been veiled by St Patrick, whose feast day was 9 March (Seathrún Céitinn's History of Ireland 1841 edition edited by Dermod O'Connor lists 14 Saints gleaned from the martyrologies and heroic literature each called Brigid, not including Bríga or Brigit of Kildare). The Martyrology of Donegal lists Brighit daughter of Diomman (feast day 21 May), Brighit of Moin-miolain (feast day on 9 March), and what may be five more: Brigid the daughter of Leinin (associated with Killiney, feast day 6 March), Brighit of Cillmuine (12 November), Brighe of Cairbre (feast day 7 January). and two other Brighits (feast days 9 March, the second Brigit of that date, and 30 Sept).
