= Nora J Murray =

Irish poet and schoolteacher

Nora J Murray (1888–1955) was an Irish poet and school teacher at the heart of the Ardclough Sedition Case, when her teaching of Irish history was the subject of a complaint by a Unionist landlord Bertram Hugh Barton (1858–1927) in the aftermath of the 1916 rebellion. "The Wind Upon the Heath" was published by William Butler Yeats’ publisher Maunsel & Co in 1918.

== Early life ==
The daughter of Timothy Murray from Carrick on Shannon, she was a scholarship student at the local Marist Convent and noted musician. After graduation she taught at Ardclough National School in Co Kildare. She married Alfred Whyte on 6 September 1919.

== Poetry ==
Murray was the first lady teacher in an Irish national school to make her name as a poet. Prior to the publication of "The Wind Upon the Heath" (July 1918) to favourable critical reaction her poetry appeared in the Irish and Sunday Independent during the revolutionary period. She also had short stories published. Some poetry relating to her native County Leitrim was published post-humously.

== Sedition case ==
Murray's teaching of history was the subject of a complaint from local Unionist landlord Bertram Hugh Barton (1858–1927) in 1916.

Late in 1917 these allegations reappeared in the form of a complaint about "seditious teaching" filed to the National School commissioners in the name of Mrs Bourke, who said that her child had been discriminated against because he was the son of a British soldier.

A sworn enquiry organised by Commissioners was postponed, pending a prosecution for sedition by the Dublin Castle administration in Ireland. A defence fund was organised by local people and after considerable publicity no sedition proceedings were initiated.

== Sources ==
- Gabriel Doherty: National Identity and the Study of Irish History in "The English Historical Review," Vol. 111, No. 441 (April 1996), pp. 332–3 (Oxford University Press).
- John Rooney: The poetry of Nora J Murray in Carrick on Shannon remembered p 57. (1996)
- Nora J Murray: A Wind Upon the Heath (1918)
- Nora J Murray: Leitrim of The Lakes
- Nora J Murray: A Ridge of the West
- Eoghan Corry and Jim Tancred: Annals of Ardclough (1914)
- Freeman's Journal 29 November 1917.
- Leinster Leader 1 December 1917, 30 March 1918, 18 August 1918, 31 August 1918, 30 November 1918.
- Leitrim Observer 1 December 1917
