= Staircase tower =

Type of building wing

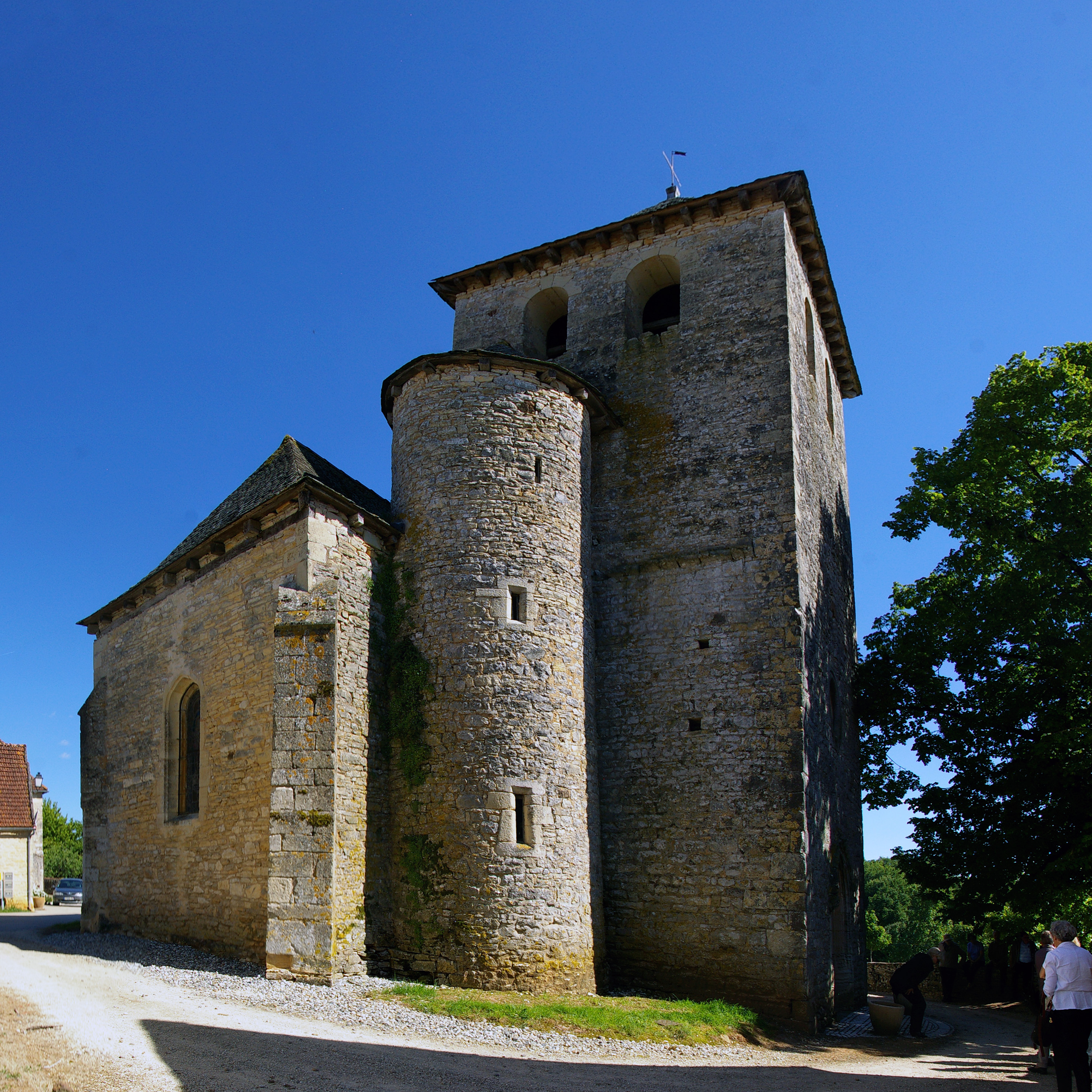
Staircase tower with no external door on the church of Saint-Pierre-ès-Liens in Rampoux (Lot), France

A staircase tower or stair tower (German: Treppenturm, also Stiegenturm or Wendelstein) is a tower-like wing of a building with a circular or polygonal ground plan that contains a stairwell, usually a helical staircase.

== History ==
Only a few examples of staircase towers have survived from ancient times (e.g. on the Imperial Baths in Trier); staircases were often superfluous on the only single-storey buildings or were built into the outer walls of buildings that were often several feet thick. This tradition continued in the keeps (donjons), churches and castles of the early and high Middle Ages; and this situation only changed with the increasing construction of purpose-built and generally rather undecorated staircase towers of the High and Late Middle Ages (Romanesque and Gothic architecture styles).

Since the Renaissance period, staircase towers were markedly more decorative and representative of status. Stairs were now rarely hidden or built externally, but there were both artistically designed, curved and straight-running staircases inside the building with ornate ceilings and railings (e. g. Château de Chambord, Palazzo Barberini and Château d'Azay-le-Rideau or Château de Chenonceau). With the increasing construction of straight staircases with intermediate landings (the modern stairwells) separate staircase towers became gradually rarer.

== Examples ==
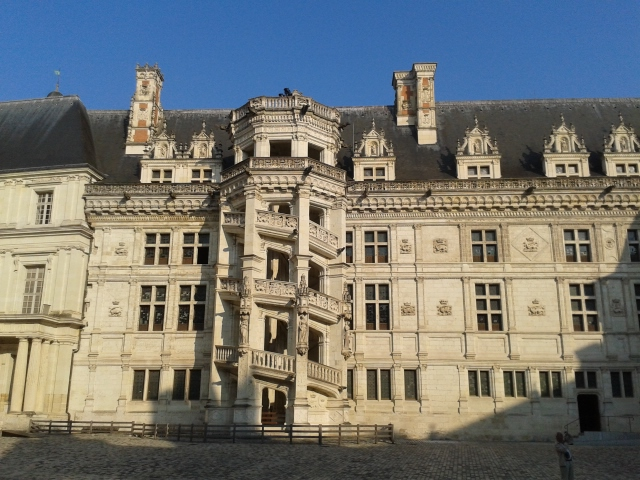
Château de Blois, France

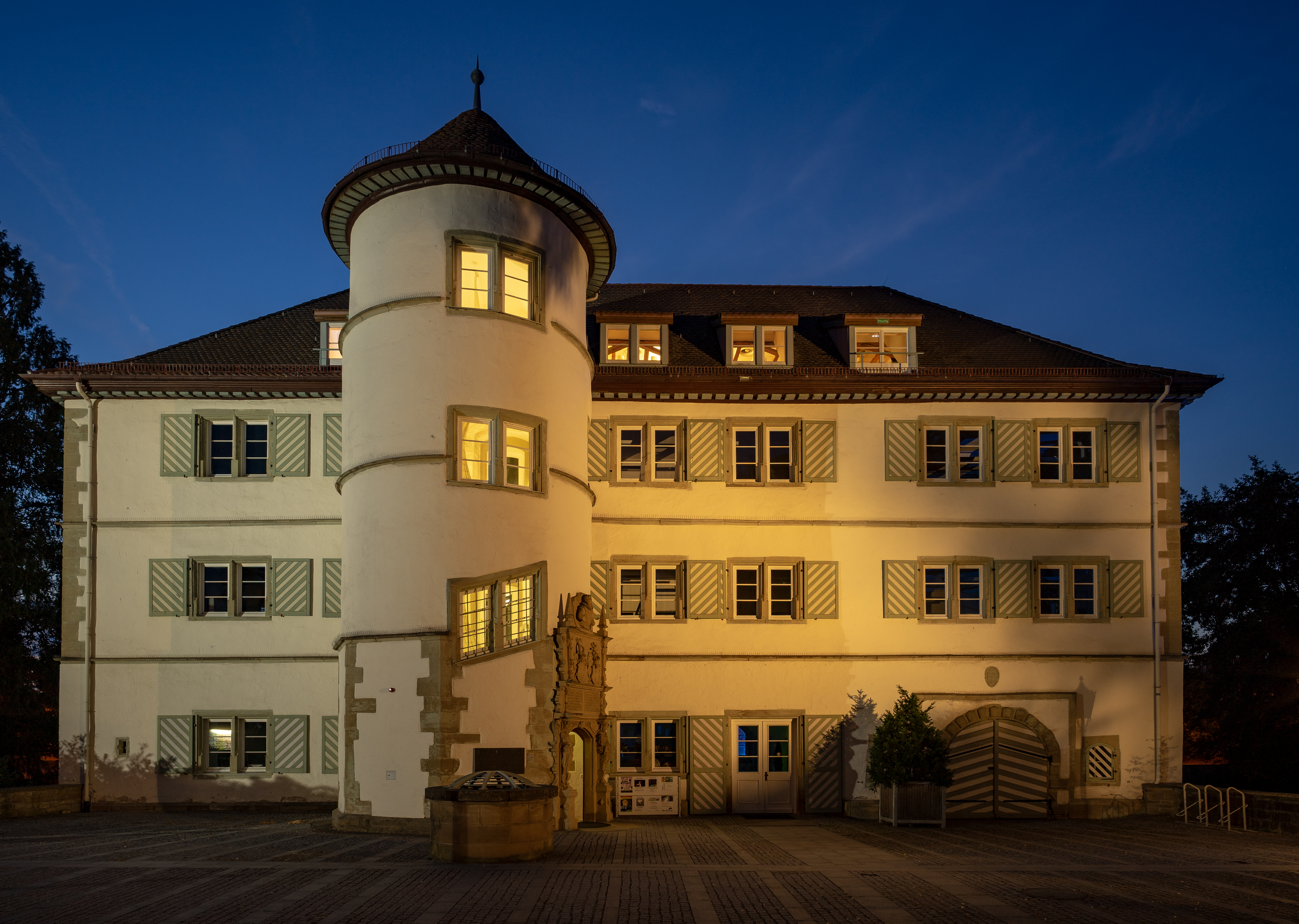
Wasserschloss Bad Rappenau, Germany

France

- Former abbey church of Saint-Menoux
- Château de Blois, Loire region
- Château de Chambord, Loire region
- Château de Tanlay, département of Yonne

Germany

- Albrechtsburg, Meißen
- Lutherhaus, Wittenberg
- Latscha Building, Frankfurt-Ostend, Hesse
- Dresden Castle, Dresden
- Bertholdsburg Castle, Schleusingen, Thuringia
- Hartenfels Palace, Torgau
- Schloss Johannisburg, Aschaffenburg, Franconia
- Schloss Köthen (Anhalt)
- Weitersroda Castle, Hildburghausen, Thuringia
- Wilhelmsburg Castle, Schmalkalden, Thuringia

Ireland

- Reeves Castle, County Kildare

== See also ==
- Traboule, a special type of staircase tower
