= Oughter Ard =

Ecclesiastical site in County Kildare, Ireland

Oughterard Uachtar Aird
- Civil parish
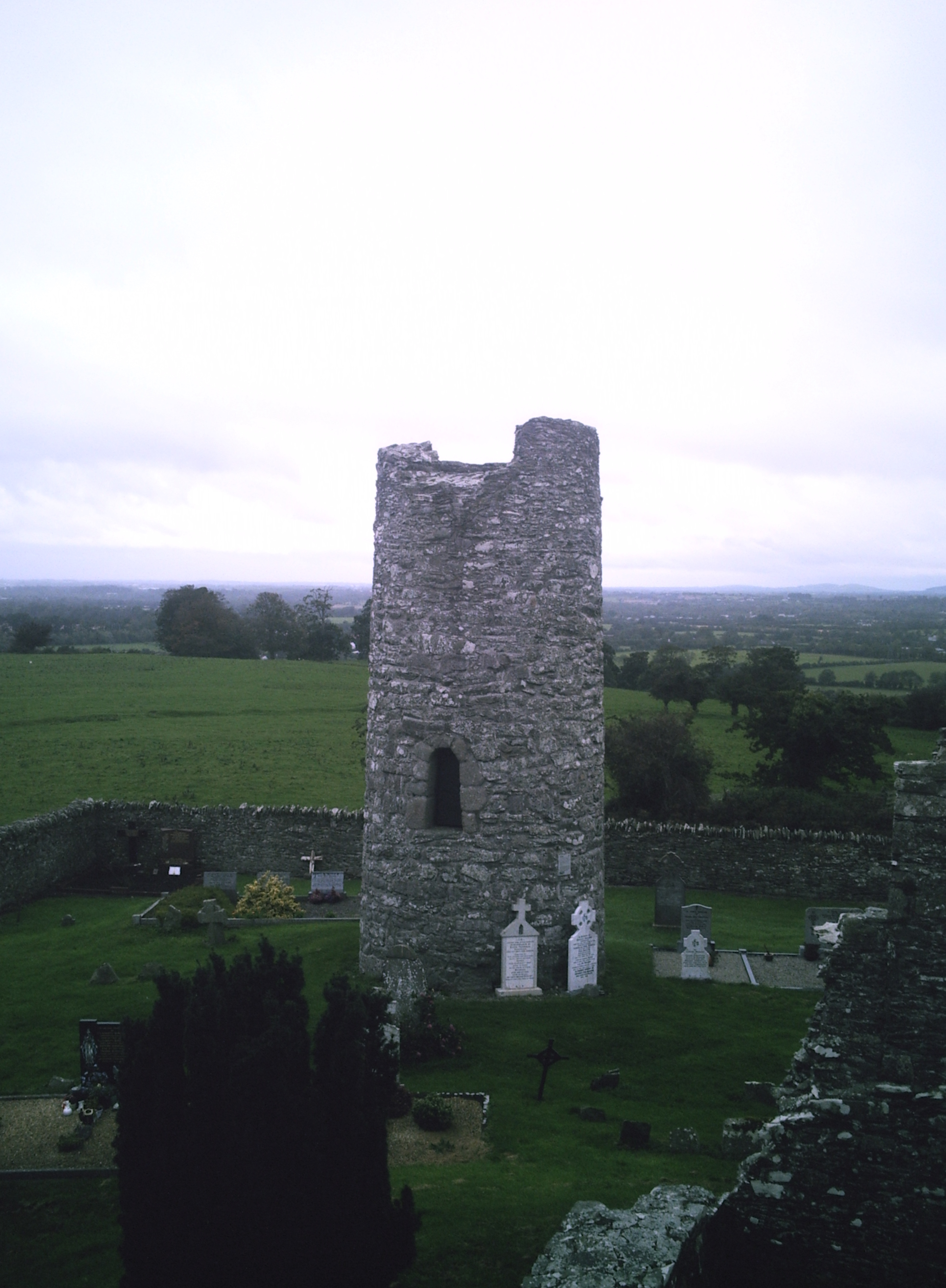
- Oughterard Round Tower

- Location in Ireland
- Coordinates: 53°16′40″N 6°33′55″W
- Country: Ireland
- Province: Leinster
- County: County Kildare
- Elevation: 121 m (397 ft)
- Time zone: UTC+0 (WET)
  - Summer (DST): UTC-1 (IST (WEST))

Oughterard (/ˌuːxtərˈɑːrd/; Irish: Uachtar Aird, "a high place") is an ecclesiastical hilltop site, graveyard, townland, civil parish, and formerly a borough and royal manor in County Kildare, Ireland. It lies close to the community of Ardclough and the border between County Kildare and Dublin. Oughterard is the burial place of Arthur Guinness.

== Geography ==
The civil parish of Oughterard, in County Kildare, lies within the historical barony of South Salt. The Placenames Database of Ireland records 10 townlands within Oughterard civil parish, including Oughterard townland itself as well as the townlands of Bishopscourt Lower and Upper, Blackhill, Boston, Castlewarden North and South, Huttonread, Quinsborough, and Tuckmilltown.

Oughterard also gives its name to an electoral division (ED) in the area. As of the 2011 census, the Oughterard ED had a population of 726, rising to 846 by the time of the 2022 census.

The village of Ardclough is nearby.

== History ==
=== Foundation of monastery ===
The round tower and ancient monastery at Oughter Ard is associated with a nunnery established c. 605 AD by foundress Saint Briga (feast day 21 January).

Bríga, daughter of Congall, who is also associated with Brideschurch near Sallins (53°14′36″N 6°41′28″W), and possibly with Kilbride in County Waterford (52°11′24″N 7°09′51″W), is not to be confused with Brigit of Kildare daughter of Dubhthach, the famous St Brigid whose feast day was 1 February; St Brigid, daughter of Doma, whose feast day was 7 February; or the earlier St Brigid, daughter of Neman, also associated with Kildare and said to have been veiled by St Patrick, whose feast day was 9 March (Seathrún Céitinn's History of Ireland 1841 edition edited by Dermod O'Connor lists 14 saints gleaned from the martyrologies and heroic literature each called Brigid, not including Bríga or Brigit of Kildare.). The Martyrology of Donegal lists Brighit daughter of Diomman (feast day 21 May), Brighit of Moin-miolain (feast day on 9 March), and what may be five more: Brigid the daughter of Leinin (associated with Killiney, feast day 6 March), Brighit of Cillmuine (12 November), Brighe of Cairbre (feast day 7 January). and two other Brighits (feast days 9 March, the second Brigit of that date, and 30 Sept).

The pre-Christian site stands on a ley line between the Longstone Rath and running north to a ford over the River Liffey at Donaghcumper Church, Celbridge. The early Christian Church often built upon formerly druidic sites.

=== Derchairthinn ===
The site is also associated also with another sixth-century female saint, Saint Derchairthinn (feast day 8 March) "of the race of Colla Uais, Monarch of Érinn." Colla was a son of Cairbre Lifechair and High King in 306–310.

=== Political patronage ===
This monastery was under the patronage of a local branch of the Uí Dúnlainge dynasty which rotated the kingship of Leinster between 750–1050. In that period, a sub-dynasty known as Uí Fáeláin formed, which included ten Uí Dúnchada Kings of Leinster. They established their base at nearby Lyons Hill. Their cousins patronised the monastery of Kildare and Glendalough.

=== Royal manor ===
Ougherard became a royal manor and borough in the 12th century and a ruined castle nearby dates to 1300. Plough headlands from medieval times can still be seen in fields adjoining the churchyard.

=== Medieval landmarks ===
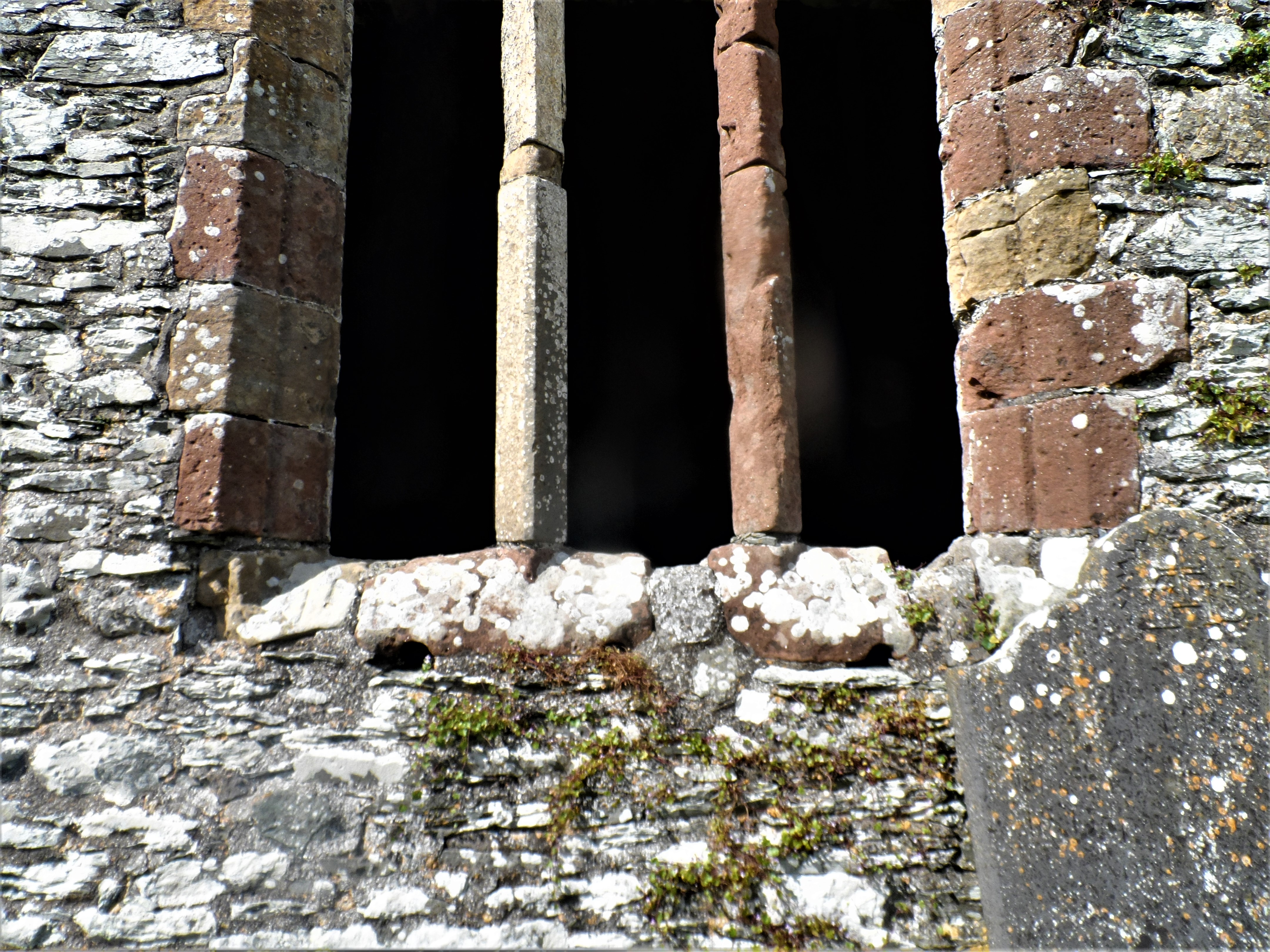
Three-light square-headed east window

Research by archaeological historian Mike O'Neill has established the ruined church on the site dates to c. 1350 and not, as previously thought, 1609. The ruined church is now entered through one of the windows, as both original doorways serve as mausoleums. The 8th century round tower, one of five in County Kildare, is in a good state of repair, but it is topless and only the first 8 metres remain. A small ruined castle tower stands about 300 metres southeast of the graveyard.

=== Destruction and restoration ===
The hilltop monastery and round tower were burned by the Dublin Vikings under Sigtrygg Silkbeard in 995. During the Norman invasion of Ireland in 1169–71, the parish was a part of the large estates given as a dowry by Dermot McMurrough on the marriage of his daughter Eva (Aoife) to Strongbow in 1170. Next, it was owned by Adam de Hereford, who willed all his lands to St Thomas monastery in Thomas Street, Dublin, and died in 1210. For several centuries the monastery rented the land to tenant farmers until the dissolution of the monasteries in 1536–41. The 1303 Papal taxation listed it as 'Outherard' and it was also spelt as 'Wochtred' before 1500. The parish of Oughterard was eventually united with Lyons in 1541. The calendar rolls reference 1609, which led to its mistakenly being cited as a foundation date by Walter Fitzgerald in 1898. This was followed by another which described the church as being "in ruins" by 1620. It is not clear when the church fell into disuse.

=== Civil survey 1654–56 ===
Sir Philip Perceval (d.1647) owned Castlewarden when listed in the Survey of 1640. Some of his estate papers were published in the "Egmont Manuscripts" in 1905.

Following the Cromwellian conquest of Ireland in 1649–53, land had to be surveyed and then often confiscated from Parliament's opponents to pay its debts under the Adventurers' Act 1640. The survey listed four townlands in Oughterard parish; Oughterard, Bishopscourt, Hutton Read and Castlewarden. Oughterard was valued at £82 p.a. rental value and it belonged to four men. Its 410 acres were under arable crops except for 10 acres (40,000 m^{2}) of pasture and meadow; today it is mostly grassland.

Historical population
Year	Pop.	±%
1821	550	—
1831	223	−59.5%
1841	460	+106.3%
1851	440	−4.3%
1861	433	−1.6%
1871	409	−5.5%
1881	347	−15.2%
1891	278	−19.9%
1901	313	+12.6%
1911	305	−2.6%
1926	235	−23.0%
1936	251	+6.8%
1946	357	+42.2%
1951	394	+10.4%
1956	419	+6.3%
1996	593	+41.5%
2002	668	+12.6%
2006	690	+3.3%

=== Arthur Guinness and other notable burials ===
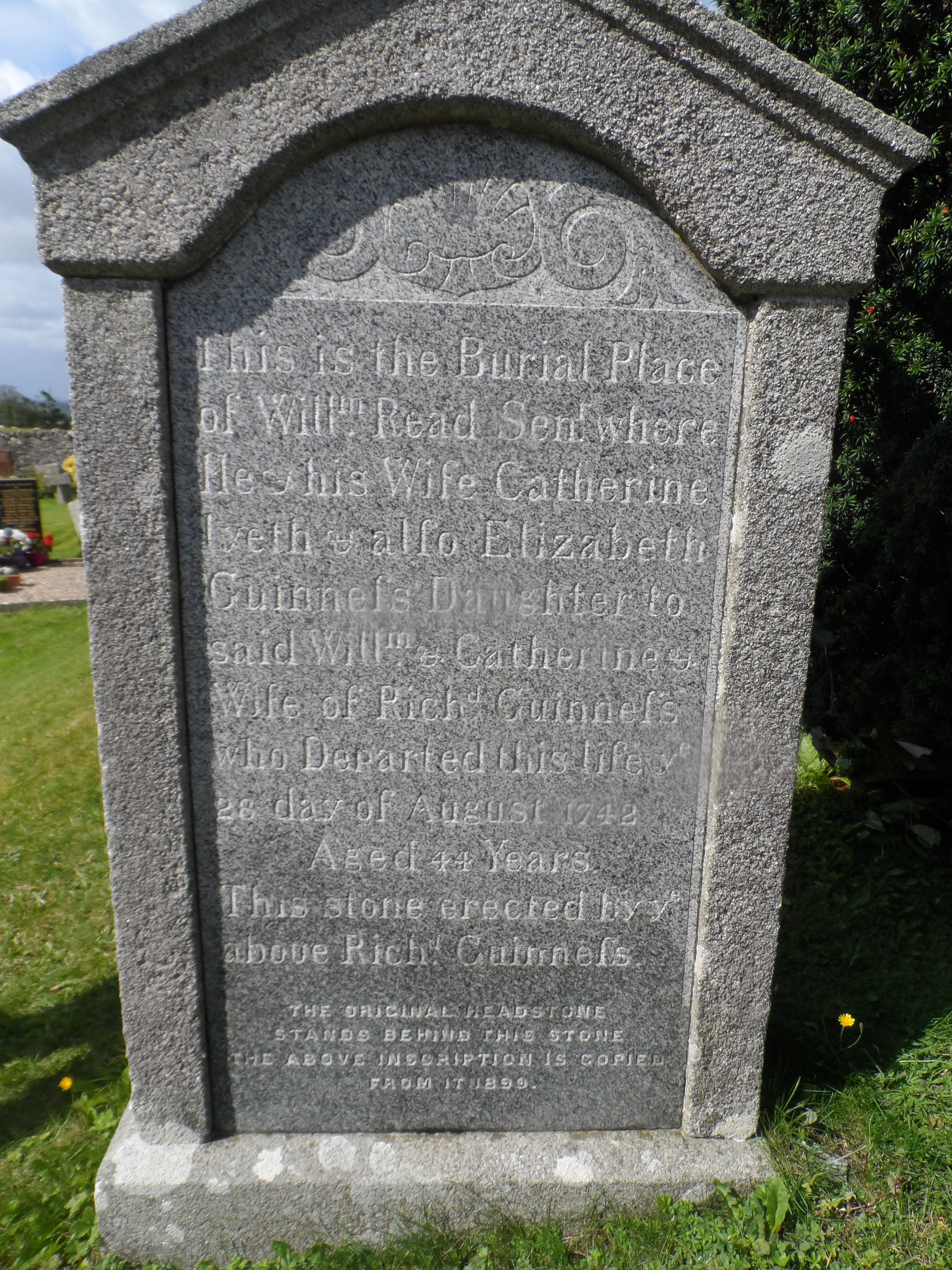
Grave of several Guinness relatives

Until the construction of the turnpike road in the adjoining valley in 1729, Oughterard was situated on the main road from Dublin to Limerick and Cork. According to Patrick Guinness's "Arthur's Round" (2008), Arthur Guinness's grandfather William Read, a local farmer, started selling home-brewed ale from a roadside stall in 1690 to troops en route to the battles in the Jacobite wars. Guinness was taken back to Oughterard to be buried in the Read family plot in January 1803. Local tradition holds that Guinness was born at the Read household, where his mother returned to her childhood home, in the tradition of the time, to give birth. Three prospective birth sites have been identified, most likely at Oughterard 53°16′35″N 6°33′41″W, but also possibly at Read homesteads the adjoining townlands of Boston 53°15′58″N 6°30′21″W, Castlewarden 53°15′56″N 6°32′41″W and Huttonread 53°17′03″N 6°33′41″W, which takes its name from the Read family, all within Oughterard parish.

Later in 1803 Arthur Wolfe, Lord Kilwarden who lived at Newlands, County Dublin—the most famous victim of Robert Emmet's 1803 rebellion—was buried here in the Wolfe mausoleum, a grave that dates to 1650. James Phipps, "A Captain of Insurgents" who took part in the Battle of Ovidstown in 1798, and then moved to America where he died in 1826, is commemorated, as is William Kennedy from nearby Bishopscourt, who was posthumously decorated for bravery having died in the Battle of the Bulge during World War II.

=== Duel ===
Daniel O'Connell (1775–1847) fought a duel with John D'Esterre on 1 February 1815 in an adjoining field, then a part of the Ponsonbys' Bishopscourt estate, now owned by the King family. O'Connell described a Dublin Corporation provision for the poor as "beggarly" on 24 Jan and was issued the challenge from John D'Esterre, a champion of the conservative and Protestant cause at the time. D'Esterre died as a result of his wounds. A detachment of cavalry sent out from Dublin arrived too late to prevent the duel from taking place. A commemorative boulder having been removed, the site of the duel was re-established in 2007 after consultations with local people.

== In popular culture ==
In the film Mission: Impossible, Tom Cruise's character is told that a US senator is unavailable "because he is fishing at the Oughter Ard Slew in County Kildare." The Grand Canal holds fish and runs about 1 km to the north.
