= Castledillon, County Kildare =

Castledillon Díseart Iollan
- Civil parish
- Location in Ireland
- Coordinates: 53°18′30″N 6°35′22″W
- Country: Ireland
- Province: Leinster
- County: County Kildare
- Time zone: UTC+0 (WET)
  - Summer (DST): UTC-1 (IST (WEST))

Castledillon (Irish: Díseart Iollan) is a civil parish on the banks of the River Liffey near Straffan, County Kildare in Ireland. The civil parish, which is approximately 4.4 km^{2} (1.7 sq mi) in area, contains the townlands of Castledillon Lower and Castledillon Upper.

== Etymology ==
The Irish name Disert-Iolladhan (Disertillan) translates as Iolladhan's or Illan's hermitage. The word Castle was substituted for Disert as in last name. Ilann's feast day is listed as 2 Feb in the Martyrology of Tallaght and he was accorded a genealogy which indicated close kinship with the Ui Dunglainge kings of Leinster. The ancient Irish genealogy claims that Cormac: second son of Olioll, was King of Leinster for nine years; abdicated A.D. 515, and died a monk at Bangor, 567, had: 1. Cairbre Dubh, King of Leinster, who died in 546; 2. Felim, from whom descended Cormac, of Tullac; 3. Iolladon, priest of Desert Iolladoin (now "Castledillon"), who had St. Criotan (11 May), of Magh Credan and Acadfinnech (on the river Dodder), and of Crevagh Cruagh, County Dublin. In 1202 Thomas de Hereford granted Thillerdelan to St Wolstan's religious community in nearby Celbridge.

== History ==
=== Medieval landmarks ===
By 1294, the church of Tristeyldelane was described as "not worth the services of chaplains" in the Calendar of Christ Church deeds. The site is now identified by a pile of stones and one headstone, erected in 1758 to the Spellissy family. The Castledillon Friars Stone, possibly erected for a 15th-century abbot of St Wolstan's (four miles to the east), remained on the site until removed to the Visitor centre in Kildare town.

=== Castle ===
In 1271, William de Mandesham of Kavesham was granted the lands of Tristildelane. The tower house of Castledillon passed to the de Hereford and Rochford families (1359). It was burned in the wars of 1641-2 but was recorded in the 1659 census as "being since repaired by Mrs Bowell" increased in value from £60 to £50. It remained intact until the 18th century until it rapidly fell into disrepair and stones were removed from the site. As of the late 20th and early 21st century, no visible evidence of the structure remained. In 1557, Patrick Sarsfield of Tisteldalen, great-great-granduncle of Patrick Sarsfield, 1st Earl of Lucan, obtained a pardon from the English colonial government and in 1560 obtained the lease of White Church alias Tullatipper. Monitoring of development undertaken in July 2001 led to the recovery of pottery sherds of both medieval and post-medieval date from a layer of fill. This material was introduced to the site, at some unknown time in the past, in order to fill a natural hollow.

=== Castledillon Friar's Stone ===
An incised slab with a priest, which was removed from Castledillon, is now in the visitor centre in Kildare town. The stone has been damaged and although the inscription ICI GiST DEV DE SA ALLME EIT MERCI is visible, it is a generic phrase which translates as "Here Lies (name illegible) God Have Mercy on His Soul." The absence of a crosier has been noted to suggest he was not a bishop, as accorded in folklore, and may have been abbot in the friary of St Wolstan's four miles to the north east, perhaps after it was dissolved in 1541. The left hand of the carved figure carries a reliquary suspended around the neck and hangs below a brooch like object at the throat. His right hand rests palm downward on the chest.

=== Spellisy headstone ===
The last remaining headstone in the local graveyard bears the inscription:

IHS
This Burial place
Belongs to Cornelues
Spellicy & posterity
Where Lyeth ys body
Of Ann Spellicy who
Died August ye 1th 1758
Adge 15. Allso Iudeth
Lesther, & John Spellicy

== Firing range ==
During the First World War, the British Army set up a firing range on "The Butts", McKenna's land in Castledillon. A folk song from the period contains the following verses:

There is an isolated, desolated spot I’d like to mention/ Where all the folks quick march or stand to attention/ It’s miles away from anywhere, bedad it is a rum one/ A chap lived there for fifty years and never saw a woman

And when the war is over we'll capture Kaiser Billy/ To shoot him would be merciful and absolutely silly/ So send him down to Castledillon among the mud and clay/ And let the Crown Prince watch him, as he slowly fades away

== Bibliography ==
- Ardclough Churches 1985 Souvenir Brochure.
- Barton, Derick: Memories of Ninety Years: An Autobiography (Privately published 1985)
- Corry, Eoghan and Tancred, Jim: Annals of Ardclough (Ardclough GAA 2004).
- Fitzgerald, Walter: Castledillon (Kildare Journal Archaeological Society Vol VI 1909).
- Fitzpatrick, W J: Life, Times and contemporaries of Lord Cloncurry (1855).
- Kelly, Martin J: Owners and tenants of Barberstown Castle (Kildare Journal Archaeological Society 1975).
- Journals of the Kildare Archaeological Society: Volume II : 259, 283. Volume IV : 114. Volume VI : 207–213. Volume XII : 265.
- Lawless, Valentine, Lord Cloncurry: Recollections (Dublin 1849). via Quinnipiac University
